= Eliane Umuhire =

Rwandan-French actress (born 1986)

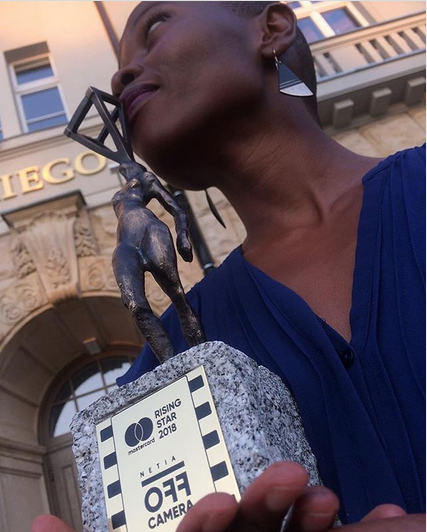
- Eliane Umuhire after receiving the MasterCard 2018 Rising Star from the International Festival of Independent Cinema Off Camera
- Born: 1986 (age 39–40); Kigali, Rwanda
- Citizenship: France; Rwanda
- Occupations: Actress, comedian
- Notable work: Neptune Frost (2021)
- Awards: 2017: Silver Hugo Award for Best Actress, Chicago International Film Festival

Eliane Umuhire (born 1986) is a French-Rwandan actress. She is known for her breakthrough role in the Polish film Birds Are Singing in Kigali (2017), for which she won several Best Actress awards at various festivals. Other notable performances include in the 2021 Afrofuturist film Neptune Frost and the 2024 film A Quiet Place: Day One, as Zena.

== Early life and education ==
Eliane Umuhire was born in Kigali, Rwanda in 1986. Her parents, who ran a pharmacy business loved the arts and culture, and her mother was an avid reader. In secondary school, her French teacher gave her a piece to memorise and perform, and her love of acting was sparked by that experience.

She attended the National University of Rwanda in Butare, Huye District, where she studied accounting, graduating in 2004. She also did some acting on stage there in 2005.

She trained in acting at Mashirika Performing Arts and Media Company (est. 1997) with Hope Azeda, and at Ishyo Arts Center with Carole Karemera.

== Career ==
Umuhire is an actress, dancer, director, and producer.

=== Screen ===
In 2015 Umuhire appeared in the British/Rwandan film Things of the Aimless Wanderer, written, directed, and co-produced by Kivu Ruhorahoza, as well as Behind the World by Clemantine Dusabijambo, both of which were both premiered at the 2015 Sundance Film Festival.

Umuhire was cast in Birds Are Singing in Kigali in 2014, (Ptaki spiewaja w Kigali), a Polish film by Krzysztof Krauze and Joanna Kos, which was released in 2017. Her performance was highly praised by reviewers in Screen Daily and Variety. and won her Best Actress awards at the Karlovy Vary International Film Festival, the Chicago International Film Festival, the Polish Film Festival, and others. The film treats the Rwandan genocide of Tutsi people in Rwanda in 1994, and the actress said that she wanted the world to know what had happened in Rwanda, so that it would never happen again anywhere.

She appeared in Saul Williams' 2021 feature film Neptune Frost, as the character Memory.

In 2022 she played Annick in Trees of Peace, as one of four women hiding during the 1994 genocide.

In 2023 she played Tshala in Augure (Omen), directed by Belgian rapper Baloji. Omen premiered at the Cannes Film Festival, where it won the Un Certain Regard New Voice Prize, and went on to become an international critical success, being nominated for and winning several awards. The film had its Rwandan premiere in Kigali on 28 June 2024.

Her role in the BAFTA-nominated short film Bazigaga, directed by Jo Ingabire Moys, earned her acting awards at the Clermont-Ferrand International Short Film Festival and the Festival International du Film Francophone de Namur.

In 2024 she appeared in the prequel A Quiet Place: Day One alongside Lupita Nyong'o, Joseph Quinn, and Djimon Hounsou, and in the same year starred in Planète B, directed by Aude Léa Rapin.

On television, Umuhire appeared in the series Nina and the Pig (La fille au coeur de cochon; 2022), created and directed by David Andre, and Haven of Grace (De Grâce), broadcast on Arte in 2023.

=== Stage ===
In 2012, Umuhire appeared in the plays La ravizor, Umutego Speciale, and African Hope.

In 2021 Umuhire played the leading role in the one-woman play, Solas with Cie Corps Indociles, directed by Brazilian director Fernanda Areias. The two had a residency together at the French Institute in Bucharest, Romania, in April 2021.

== Other activities ==
In 2024 Umuhire returned to Rwanda to give an actors' workshop at the Kigali Cine Junction film festival in its 2nd edition. Omen was screened at the festival.

Also in 2024, Umuhire was a member of the 63rd Critics' Week at the Cannes Film Festival.

== Personal life ==
During the COVID-19 pandemic, Umuhira moved to France, later acquiring French citizenship. As of 2024 she was living in Grenoble.

== Filmography ==
- 2012: Behind the Word, as Colette's mother
- 2015: Things of the aimless wanderer, as Bartender
- 2017: Birds Are Singing in Kigali, as Claudine Mugambira
- 2021: Neptune Frost, as Memory
- 2022: Bazigaga, as Bazigaga
- 2022: Trees of Peace, as Annick
- 2023: Omen, as Tshala
- 2024: A Quiet Place: Day One, as Zena
- 2024: My new friends, as Mosanne
- 2024: Planète B, as Hermès

== Awards ==
- 2017: Best Actress, Karlovy Vary International Film Festival (KVIFF)
- 2017: Silver Hugo Award for Best Actress, Chicago International Film Festival for Birds Are Singing in Kigali
- 2017: Best Actress at the Polish Film Festival
- 2018: MasterCard Rising Star at International Festival of Independent Cinema Off Camera for Birds Are Singing in Kigali
- 2018: Elzbieta Czyzewska award for best performance, at the New York Polish Film Festival
- 2018: Urania Award for Best Performance in a Leading Role at the Let's CEE Film Festival in Vienna, Austria
- 2021: Best Ensemble Cast, Trees of Peace, at the Rising Sun International Film Festival
- 2022: Best performance award, Namur International Francophone Films Festival
- 2023: Best Actress at Clermont-Ferrand International Short Film Festival, for Bazigaga
