= Polish Academy Award for Best Director =

Category of film award

Polish Film Award for Best Director
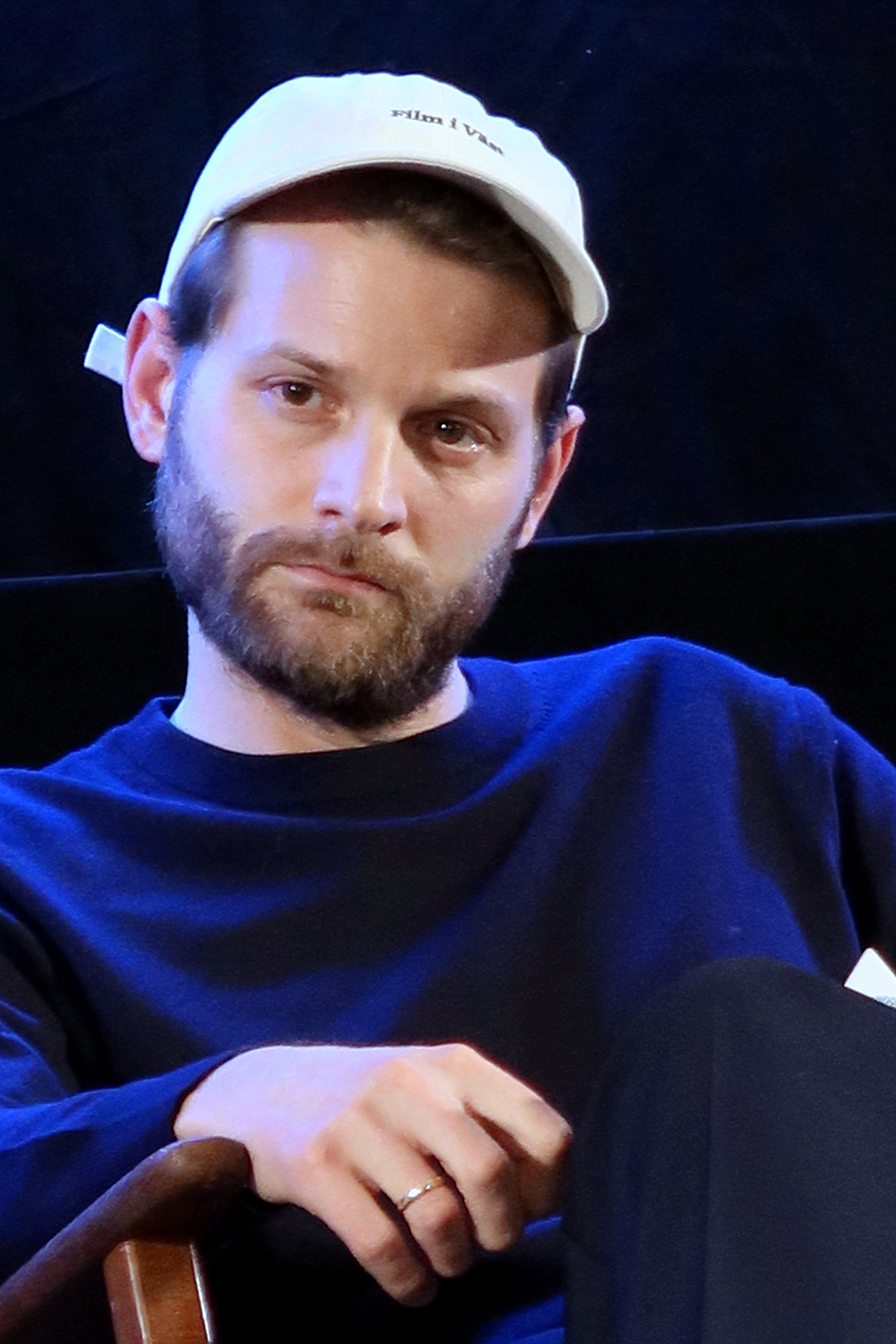
- The 2025 recipient: Magnus von Horn
- Country: Poland
- First award: 1999
- Most recent winner: Magnus von Horn; The Girl with the Needle (2025)

Highlights
- Most awards: Wojciech Smarzowski (4)
- Most nominations: Agnieszka Holland and Wojciech Smarzowski (6)
- Website: pnf.pl

The Polish Academy Award for Best Film Director is an annual award given to the best Polish film director of the year.

== Winners and nominees ==
=== 1990s ===
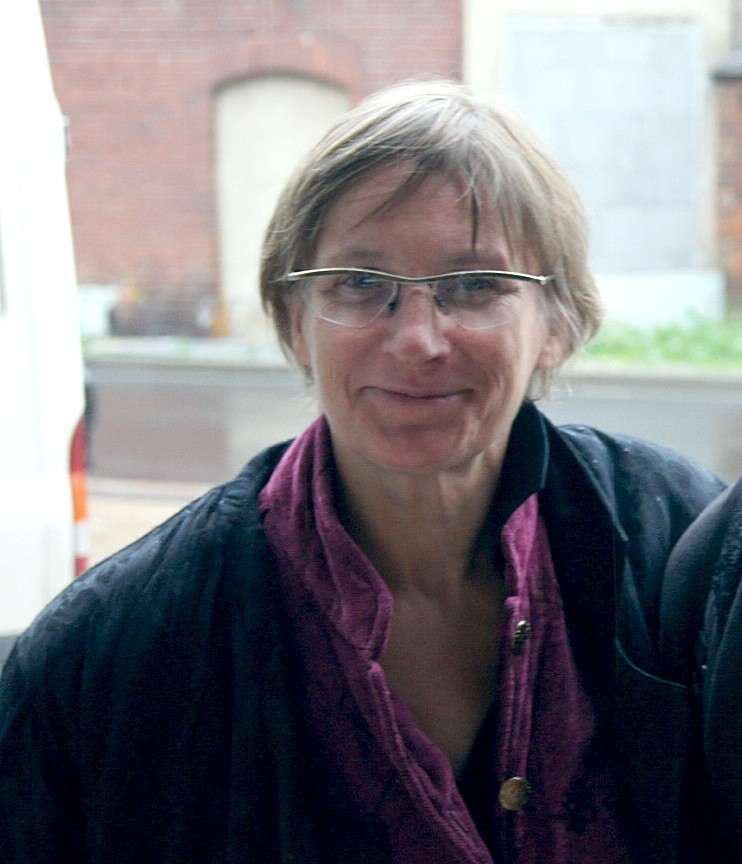
Dorota Kędzierzawska became the first winner of this award for Nothing (1998).

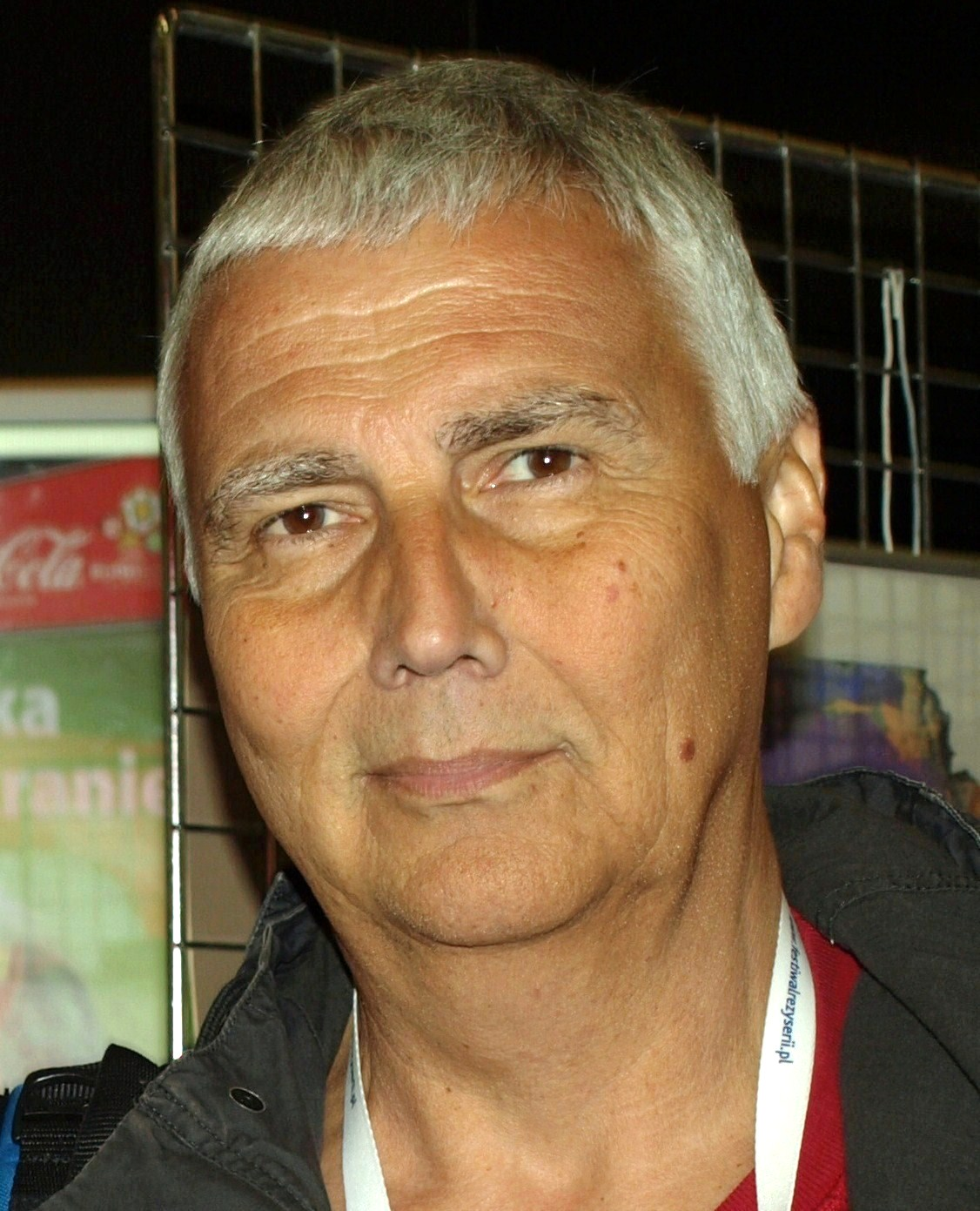
Krzysztof Krauze won two awards in this category for The Debt (1999) and Saviour Square (2006). Second win was shared with his wife Joanna Kos-Krauze.

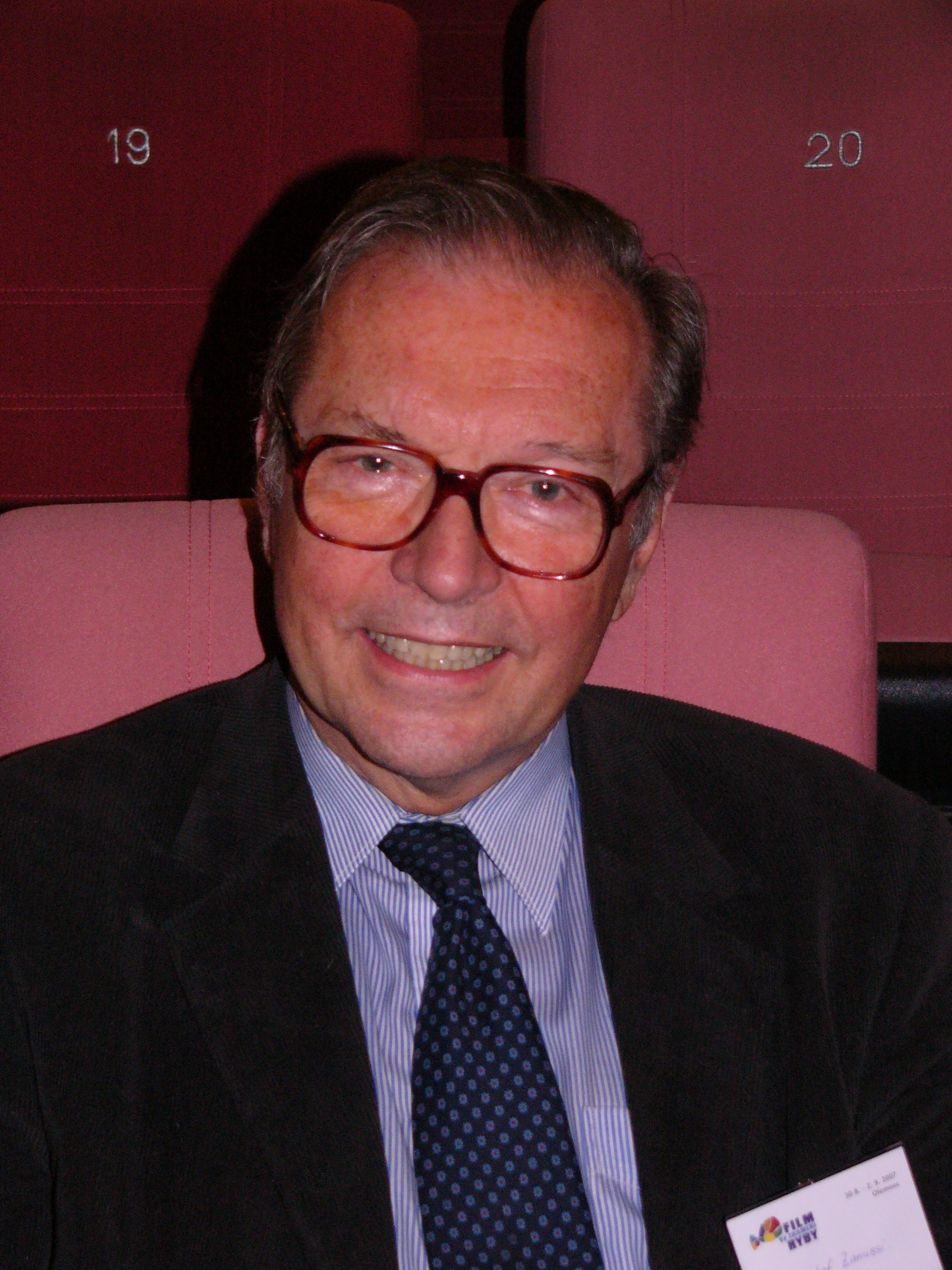
Krzysztof Zanussi won for Life as a Fatal Sexually Transmitted Disease (2000).

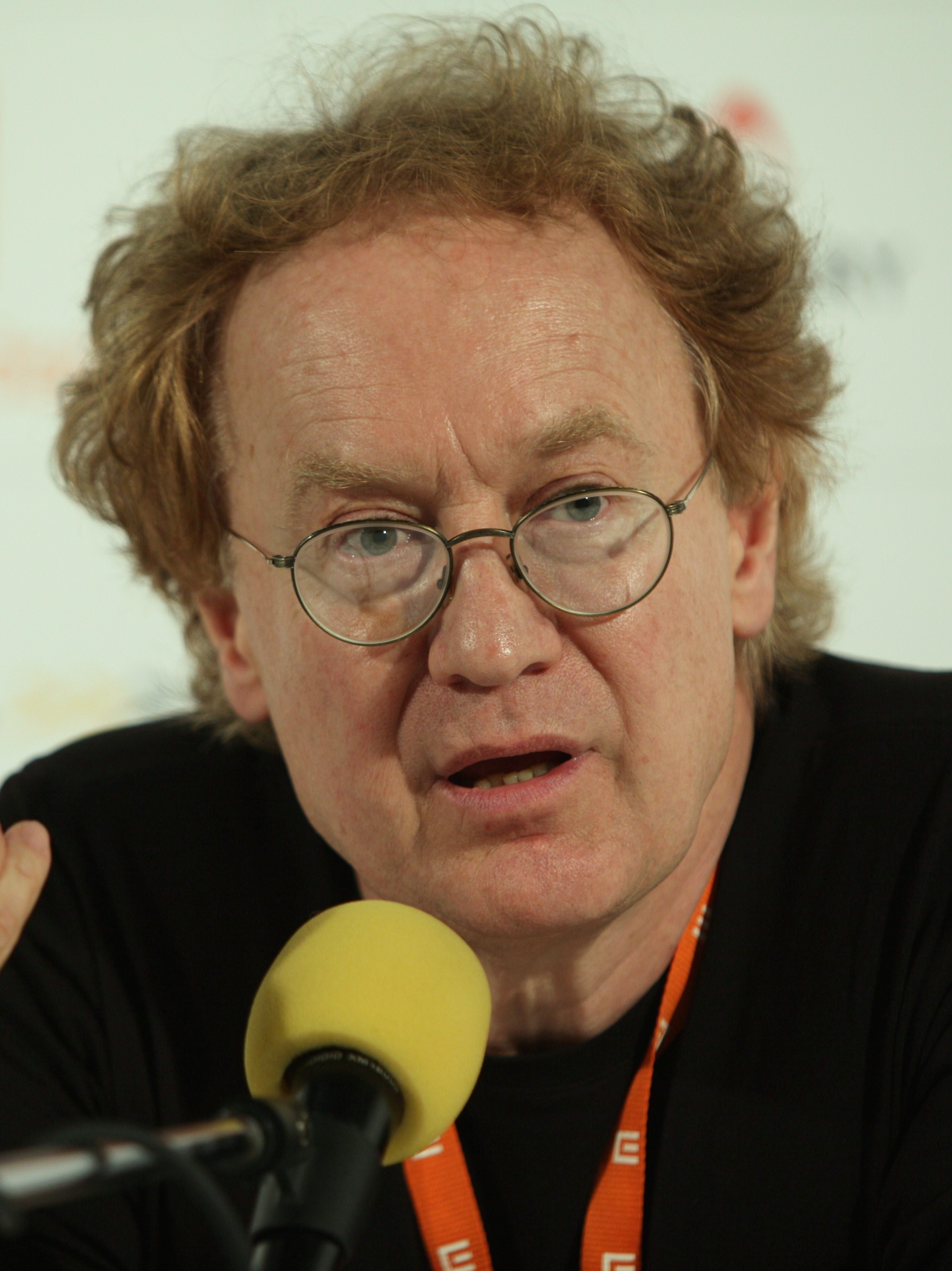
Robert Gliński won for Hi Tessa (2001).

Year	Director(s)	English title	Polish title	Ref.
1999 (1st)	Dorota Kędzierzawska	Nothing	Nic	
1999 (1st)	Leszek Wosiewicz	Home Chronicles	Kroniki domowe	
1999 (1st)	Vladimír Michálek	Sekal Has to Die	Zabić Sekala	
1999 (1st)	Michał Rosa	Farba		
1999 (1st)	Jan Jakub Kolski	History of Cinema in Popielawy	Historia kina w Popielawach	

=== 2000s ===
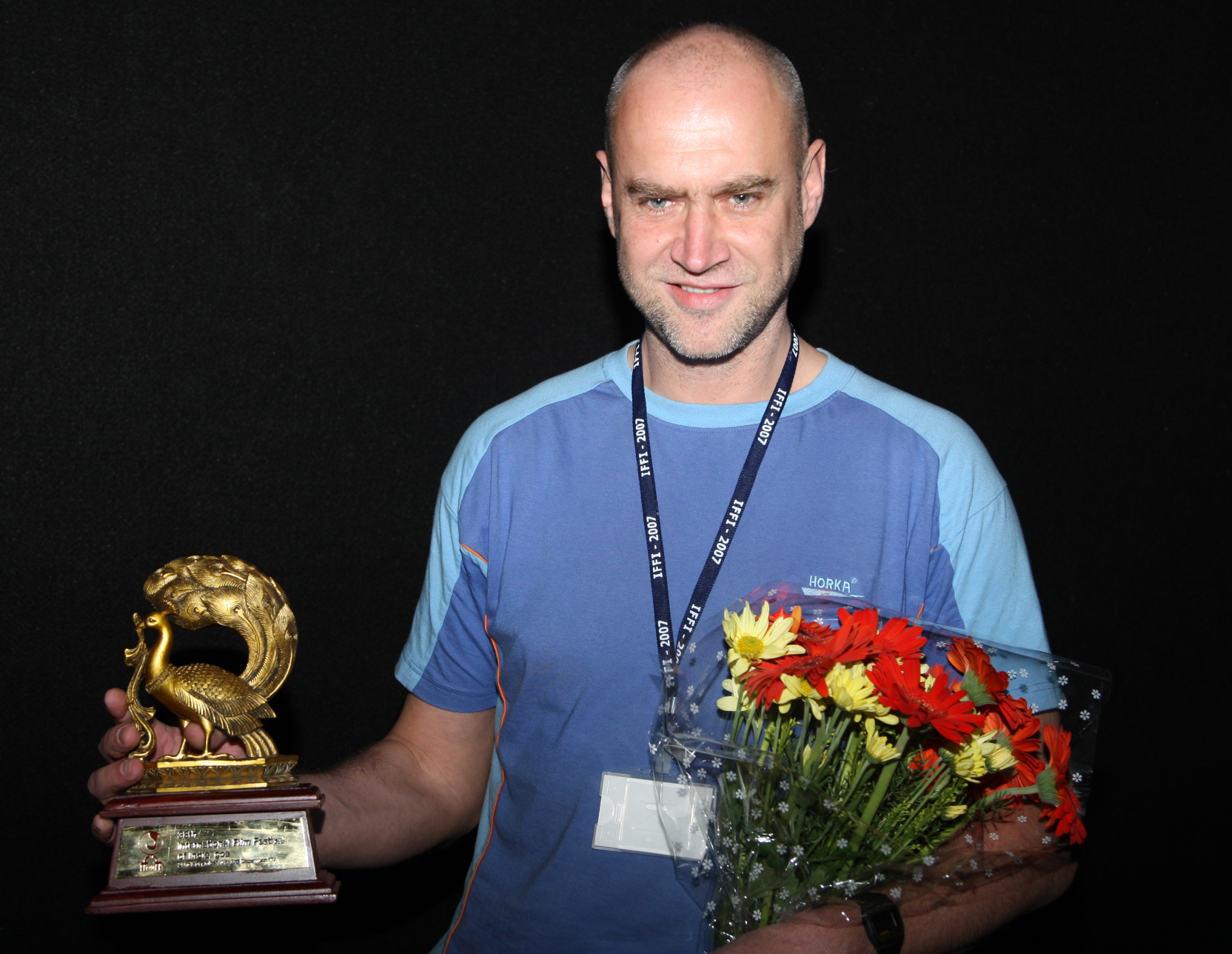
Andrzej Jakimowski won this award twice for Squint Your Eyes (2002) and Tricks (2007).

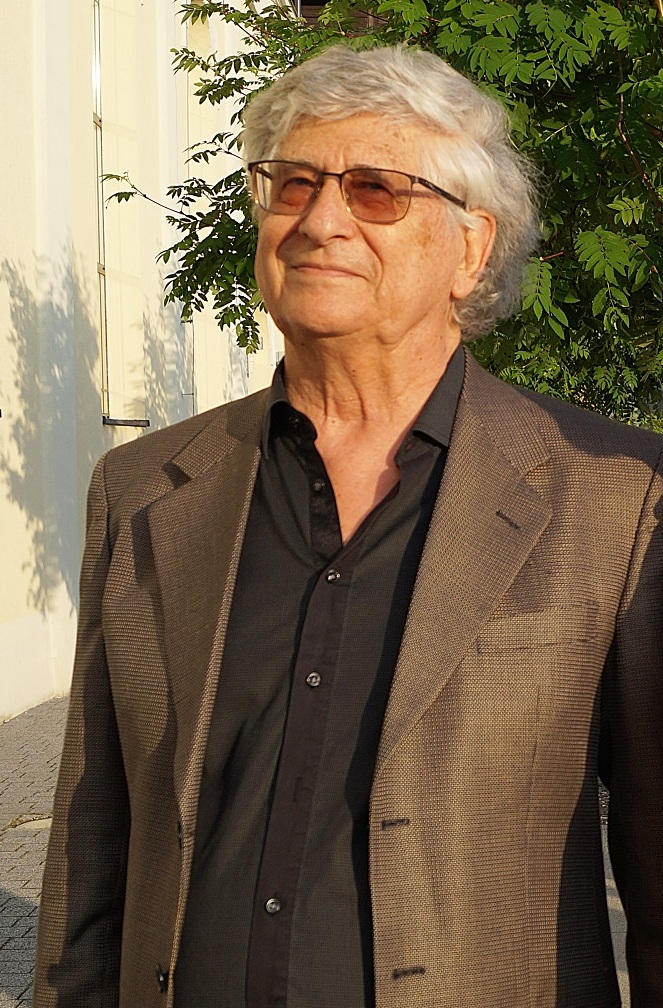
Feliks Falk won for The Collector (2005).

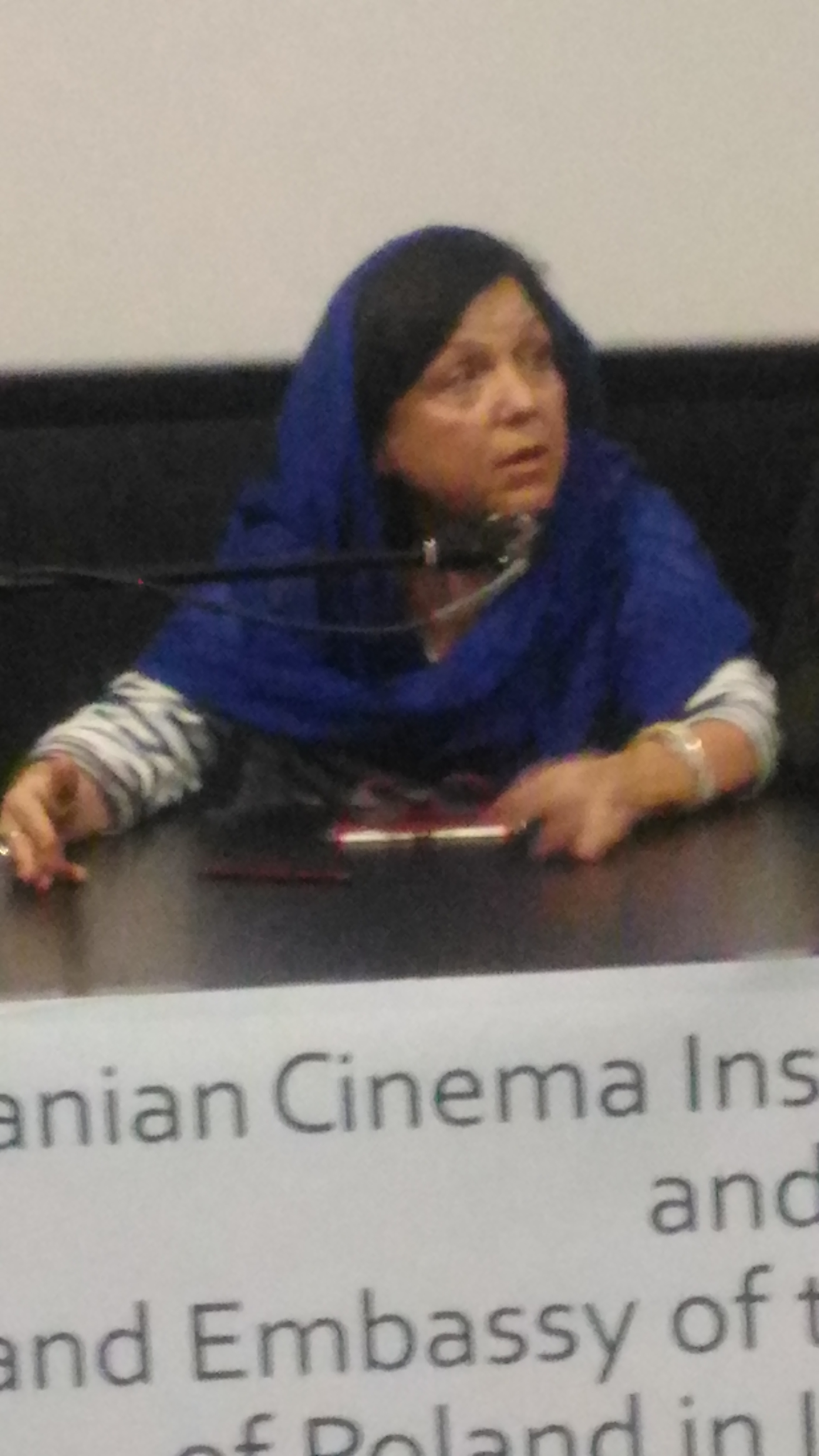
Joanna Kos-Krauze won for Saviour Square (2006) alongside her husband Krzysztof Krauze.

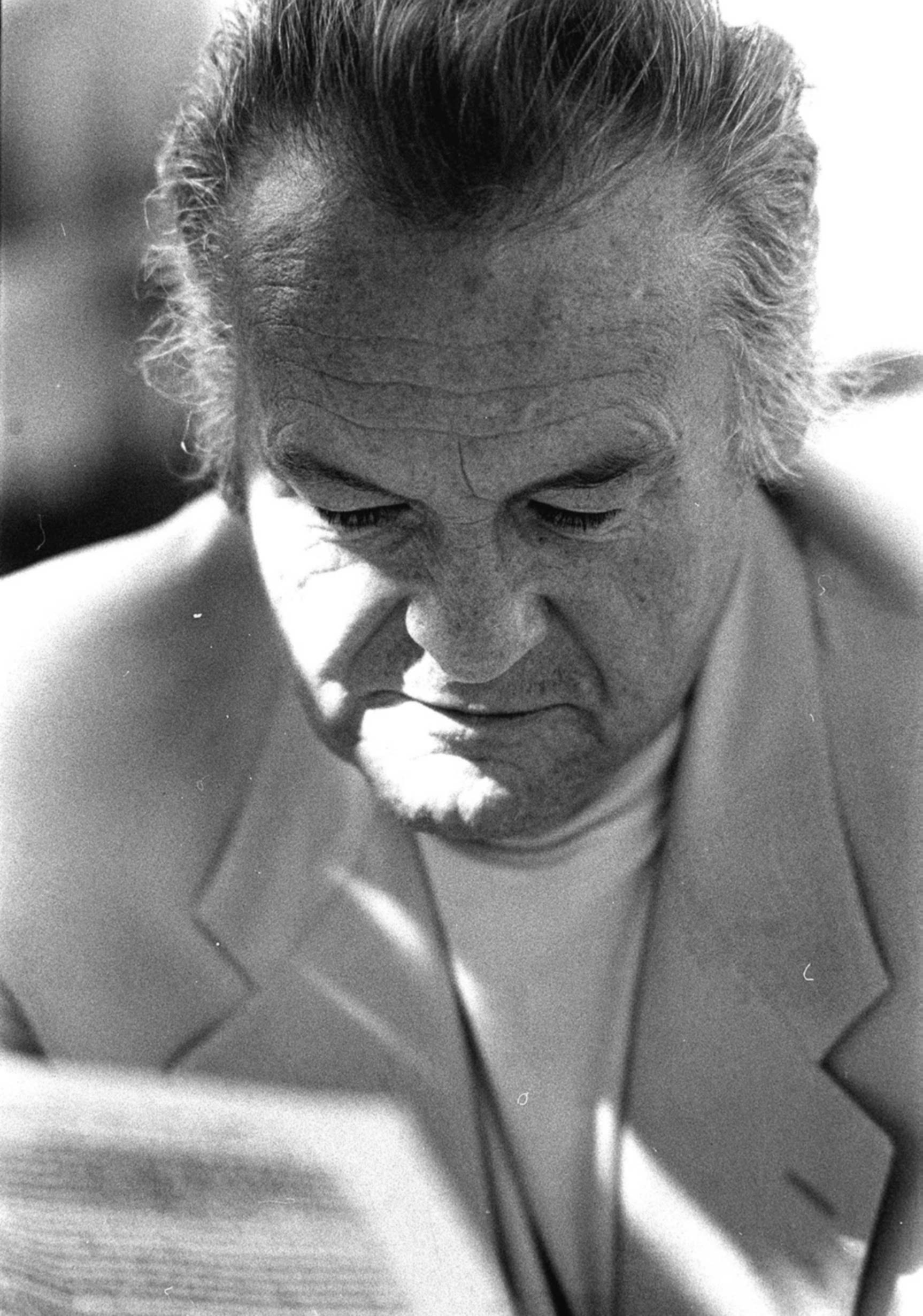
Jerzy Skolimowski won three times for Four Nights with Anna (2008), Essential Killing (2010) and EO (2022).

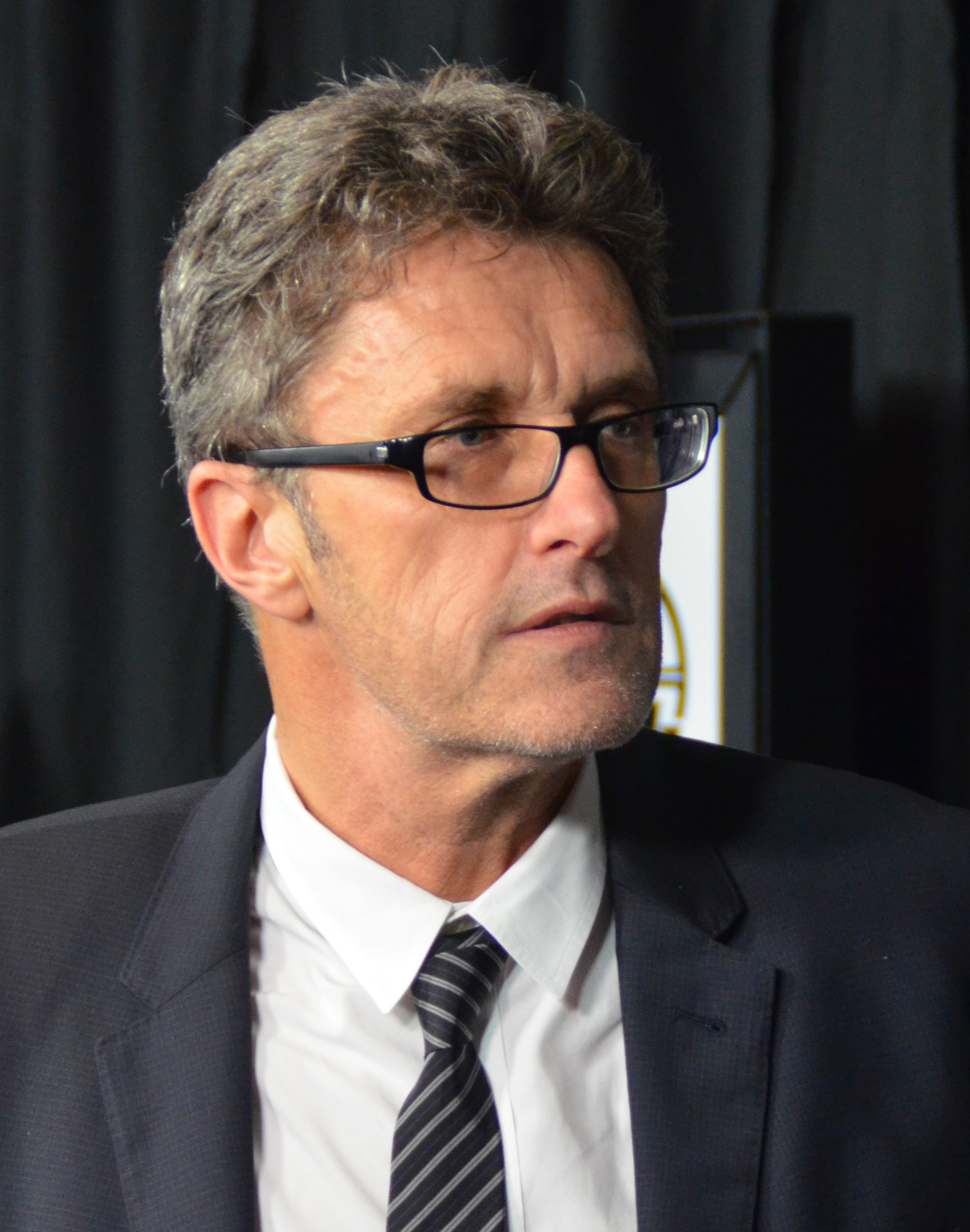
Paweł Pawlikowski won twice for Ida (2013) and Cold War (2018).

Year	Director(s)	Film		Ref.
2000 (2nd)	Krzysztof Krauze	The Debt	Dług	
2000 (2nd)	Lech Majewski	Wojaczek		
2000 (2nd)	Andrzej Wajda	Pan Tadeusz: The Last Foray in Lithuania	Pan Tadeusz	
2000 (2nd)	Jerzy Hoffman	With Fire and Sword	Ogniem i mieczem	
2000 (2nd)	Jerzy Stuhr	A Week in the Life of a Man	Tydzień z życia mężczyzny	
2001 (3rd)	Krzysztof Zanussi	Life as a Fatal Sexually Transmitted Disease	Życie jako śmiertelna choroba przenoszona drogą płciową	
2001 (3rd)	Teresa Kotlarczyk	The Primate – Three Years Out of a Thousand	Prymas. Trzy lata z tysiąca	
2001 (3rd)	Márta Mészáros	Daughters of Luck	Córy szczęścia	
2001 (3rd)	Jerzy Stuhr	The Big Animal	Duże zwierzę	
2001 (3rd)	Jan Jakub Kolski	Keep Away from the Window	Daleko od okna	
2002 (4th)	Robert Gliński	Hi Tessa	Cześć, Tereska	
2002 (4th)	Lech Majewski	Angelus		
2002 (4th)	Yurek Bogayewicz	Edges of the Lord	Boże skrawki	
2002 (4th)	Witold Leszczyński	Requiem		
2002 (4th)	Wojciech Marczewski	Weiser		
2003 (5th)	Roman Polański	The Pianist	Pianista	
2003 (5th)	Marek Koterski	Day of the Wacko	Dzień świra	
2003 (5th)	Piotr Trzaskalski	Edi		
2003 (5th)	Andrzej Wajda	The Revenge	Zemsta	
2003 (5th)	Wojciech Wójcik	There and Back	Tam i z powrotem	
2004 (6th)	Andrzej Jakimowski	Squint Your Eyes	Zmruż oczy	
2004 (6th)	Agnieszka Holland	Julie Walking Home	Julia wraca do domu	
2004 (6th)	Jan Jakub Kolski	Pornography	Pornografia	
2004 (6th)	Dariusz Gajewski	Warsaw	Warszawa	
2005 (7th)	Wojciech Smarzowski	The Wedding	Wesele	
2005 (7th)	Krzysztof Krauze	My Nikifor	Mój Nikifor	
2005 (7th)	Juliusz Machulski	Vinci		
2006 (8th)	Feliks Falk	The Collector	Komornik	
2006 (8th)	Dorota Kędzierzawska	I Am	Jestem	
2006 (8th)	Krzysztof Zanussi	Persona Non Grata	Persona non grata	
2007 (9th)	Krzysztof Krauze; Joanna Kos-Krauze	Saviour Square	Plac Zbawiciela	
2007 (9th)	Jan Jakub Kolski	Jasminum		
2007 (9th)	Marek Koterski	We're All Christs	Wszyscy jesteśmy Chrystusami	
2008 (10th)	Andrzej Jakimowski	Tricks	Sztuczki	
2008 (10th)	Andrzej Wajda	Katyń		
2008 (10th)	Andrzej Barański	A Few People, a Little Time	Parę osób, mały czas	
2008 (10th)	Łukasz Palkowski	Preserve	Rezerwat	
2009 (9th)	Jerzy Skolimowski	Four Nights with Anna	Cztery noce z Anną	
2009 (9th)	Waldemar Krzystek	Little Moscow	Mała Moskwa	
2009 (9th)	Małgorzata Szumowska	33 Scenes from Life	33 sceny z życia	

=== 2010s ===
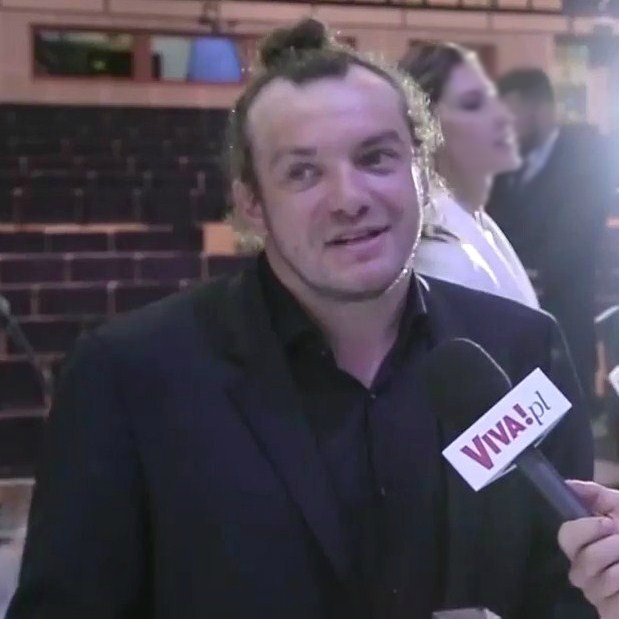
Łukasz Palkowski won for Gods (2014).

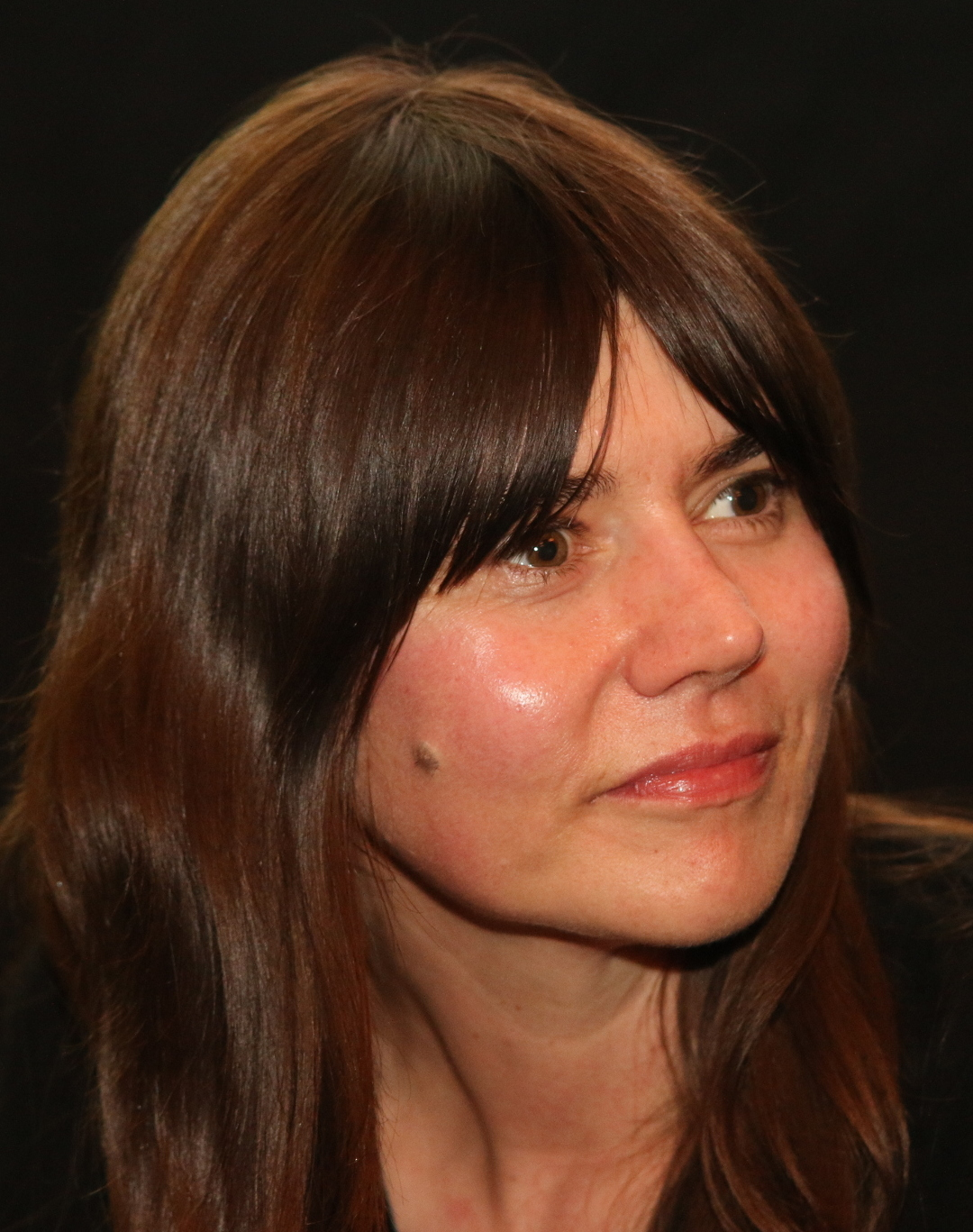
Małgorzata Szumowska won for Body (2015).

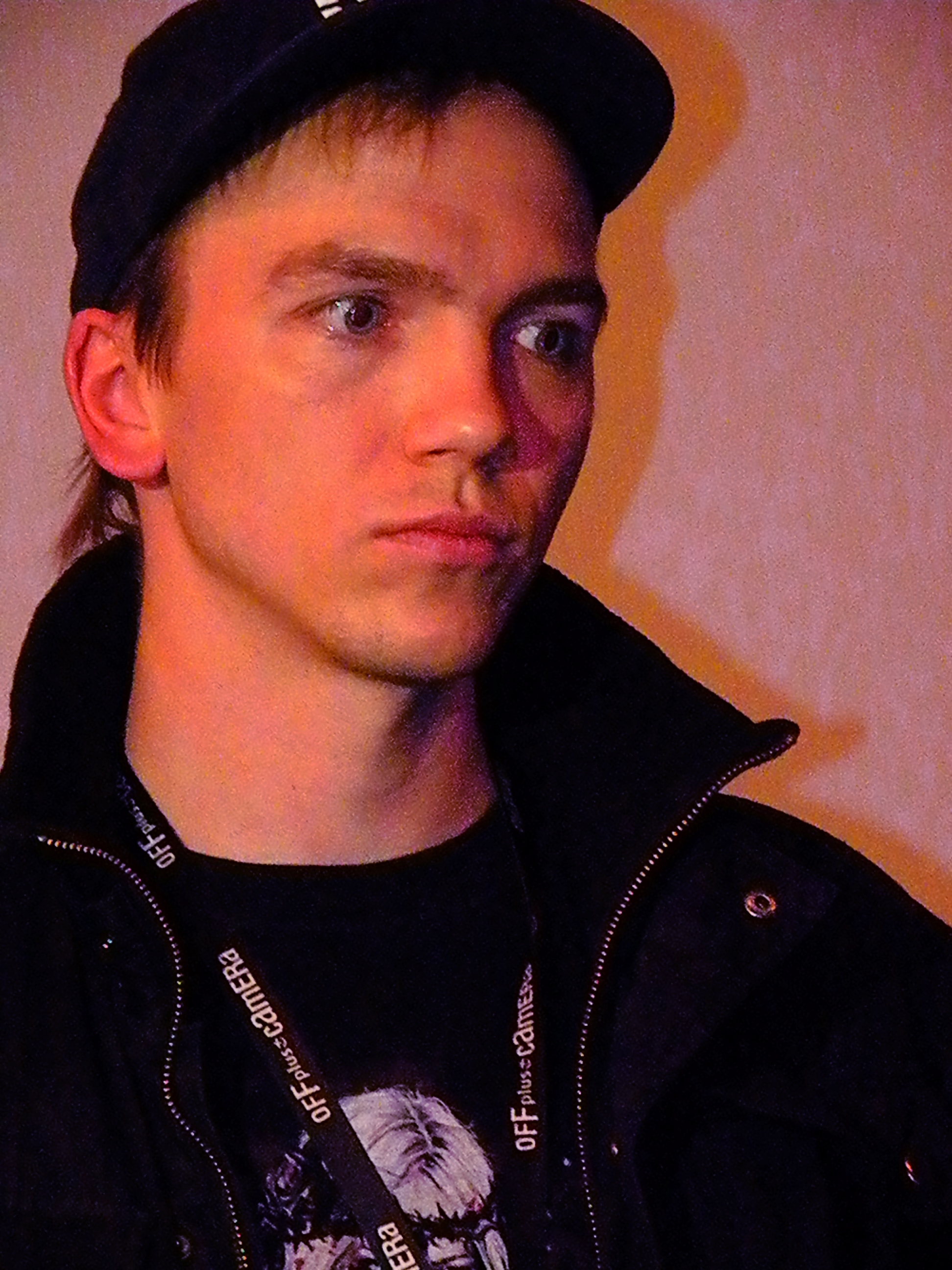
Jan Komasa won for Corpus Christi (2019).

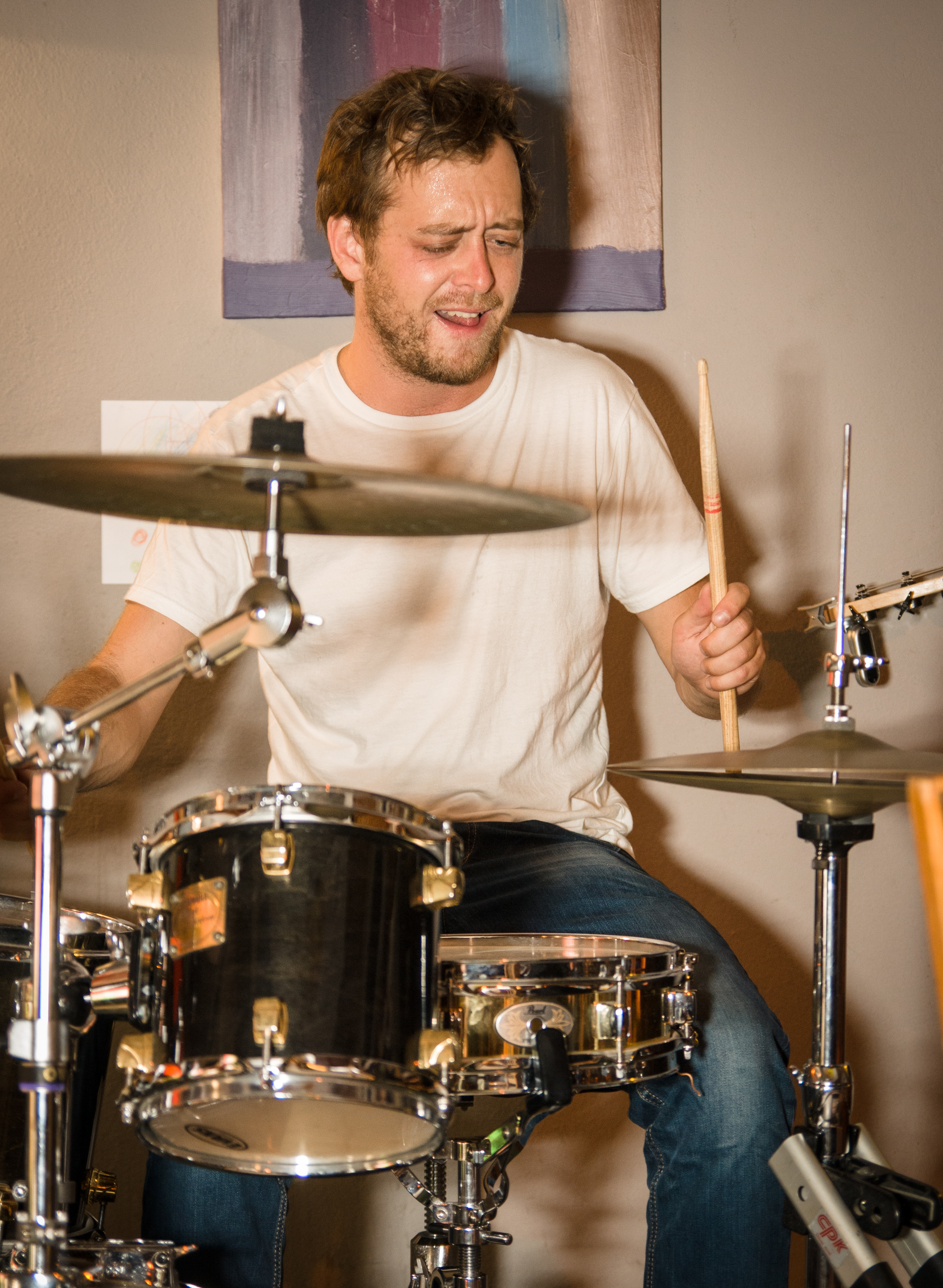
Jan Holoubek won for 25 Years of Innocence (2020), which was his feature directorial debut.

Year	Director(s)	English title	Polish title	Ref.
2010 (12th)	Wojciech Smarzowski	Dark House	Dom zły	
2010 (12th)	Borys Lankosz	The Reverse	Rewers	
2010 (12th)	Xawery Żuławski	Snow White and Russian Red	Wojna polsko-ruska	
2011 (13th)	Jerzy Skolimowski	Essential Killing		
2011 (13th)	Feliks Falk	Joanna		
2011 (13th)	Jacek Borcuch	All That I Love	Wszystko co kocham	
2012 (14th)	Wojciech Smarzowski	Rose	Róża	
2012 (14th)	Jan Komasa	Suicide Room	Sala samobójców	
2012 (14th)	Agnieszka Holland	In Darkness	W ciemności	
2013 (15th)	Roman Polański	Carnage	Rzeź	
2013 (15th)	Leszek Dawid	You Are God	Jesteś Bogiem	
2013 (15th)	Marcin Krzyształowicz	Manhunt	Obława	
2014 (16th)	Paweł Pawlikowski	Ida		
2014 (16th)	Andrzej Jakimowski	Imagine		
2014 (16th)	Maciej Pieprzyca	Life Feels Good	Chce się żyć	
2015 (17th)	Łukasz Palkowski	Gods	Bogowie	
2015 (17th)	Jan Komasa	Warsaw 44	Miasto 44	
2015 (17th)	Władysław Pasikowski	Jack Strong		
2016 (18th)	Małgorzata Szumowska	Body	Body/Ciało	
2016 (18th)	Jerzy Skolimowski	11 Minutes	11 minut	
2016 (18th)	Magnus von Horn	The Here After	Intruz	
2017 (19th)	Wojciech Smarzowski	Hatred	Wołyń	
2017 (19th)	Maciej Pieprzyca	I'm a Killer	Jestem mordercą	
2017 (19th)	Jan P. Matuszyński	The Last Family	Ostatnia rodzina	
2018 (20th)	Piotr Domalewski	Silent Night	Cicha noc	
2018 (20th)	Anna Jadowska	Wild Roses	Dzikie róże	
2018 (20th)	Agnieszka Holland; Kasia Adamik	Spoor	Pokot	
2019 (21st)	Paweł Pawlikowski	Cold War	Zimna wojna	
2019 (21st)	Janusz Kondratiuk	A Cat with a Dog	Jak pies z kotem	
2019 (21st)	Wojciech Smarzowski	Clergy	Kler	

=== 2020s ===
Year	Director(s)	English title	Polish title	Ref.
2020 (22nd)	Jan Komasa	Corpus Christi	Boże Ciało	
2020 (22nd)	Maciej Pieprzyca	Icarus. The Legend of Mietek Kosz	Ikar. Legenda Mietka Kosza	
2020 (22nd)	Agnieszka Holland	Mr. Jones	Obywatel Jones	
2020 (22nd)	Marcin Krzyształowicz	Mister T.	Pan T.	
2020 (22nd)	Bartosz Kruhlik	Supernova		
2021 (23rd)	Jan Holoubek	25 Years of Innocence	25 lat niewinności. Sprawa Tomka Komendy	
2021 (23rd)	Piotr Domalewski	I Never Cry	Jak najdalej stąd	
2021 (23rd)	Jan Komasa	The Hater	Sala samobójców. Hejter	
2021 (23rd)	Agnieszka Holland	Charlatan	Szarlatan	
2021 (23rd)	Mariusz Wilczyński	Kill It and Leave This Town	Zabij to i wyjedź z tego miasta	
2022 (24th)	Jasmila Žbanić	Quo Vadis, Aida?	Aida	
2022 (24th)	Paweł Łoziński	The Balcony Movie	Film balkonowy	
2022 (24th)	Magnus von Horn	Sweat		
2022 (24th)	Wojciech Smarzowski	The Wedding Day	Wesele	
2022 (24th)	Łukasz Ronduda; Łukasz Gutt	All Our Fears	Wszystkie nasze strachy	
2022 (24th)	Jan P. Matuszyński	Leave No Traces	Żeby nie było śladów	
2023 (25th)	Jerzy Skolimowski	EO	IO	
2023 (25th)	Damian Kocur	Bread and Salt	Chleb i sól	
2023 (25th)	Aleksandra Terpińska	Other People	Inni ludzie	
2023 (25th)	Anna Jadowska	Woman on the Roof	Kobieta na dachu	
2023 (25th)	Agnieszka Smoczyńska	The Silent Twins	Silent Twins	
2024 (26th)	Paweł Maślona	Kos		
2024 (26th)	Jan Holoubek	Doppelgänger	Doppelgänger. Sobowtór	
2024 (26th)	Michał Kwieciński	Filip		
2024 (26th)	Grzegorz Dębowski	Next to Nothing	Tyle co nic	
2024 (26th)	Agnieszka Holland	Green Border	Zielona granica	
2025 (27th)	Magnus von Horn	The Girl with the Needle	Dziewczyna z igłą	
2025 (27th)	Marcin Koszałka	White Courage	Biała odwaga	
2025 (27th)	Kamila Tarabura	Travel Essentials	Rzeczy niezbędne	
2025 (27th)	Jonathan Glazer	The Zone of Interest	Strefa interesów	
2025 (27th)	Maria Zbąska	It's Not My Film	To nie mój film	
2025 (28th)	Wojciech Smarzowski	Home Sweet Home	Dom dobry	
2025 (28th)	Agnieszka Holland	Franz	Franz Kafka	
2025 (28th)	Emi Buchwald	No Ghosts on Good Street	Nie ma duchów w mieszkaniu na Dobrej	
2025 (28th)	Maciej Sobieszczański	Brother	Brat	
2025 (28th)	Piotr Domalewski	The Altar Boys	Ministranci	

== Multiple wins and nominations ==
=== Multiple wins ===
Wins	Director
4	Wojciech Smarzowski
3	Jerzy Skolimowski
2	Krzysztof Krauze
2	Andrzej Jakimowski
2	Paweł Pawlikowski
2	Roman Polański

=== Three or more nominations ===
Nominations	Director
6	Agnieszka Holland
6	Wojciech Smarzowski
4	Jan Jakub Kolski
4	Jan Komasa
4	Jerzy Skolimowski
3	Andrzej Jakimowski
3	Krzysztof Krauze
3	Maciej Pieprzyca
3	Magnus von Horn
3	Andrzej Wajda
