= Silver Hugo Award for Best Actress =

The Silver Hugo Award for Best Actress is one of the awards presented annually by the Chicago International Film Festival to recognize an actress who has delivered an outstanding performance. The jury chooses the winner from the films competing at the festival. It was first awarded in 1965; the award for Best Actress was given under the Golden Plaque section for a few years in the 1980s, and its winners are included in this category.

== List of winners ==
Year	Actress	Film	
1965	Waheeda Rehman	The Guide	(India)
1967	Barbara Ludwizanka	Sublokator	(Poland)
1969	Gila Almagor	Matzor	(Israel)
1970	Pallavi Mehta	Kanku	(India)
1971	Simone Signoret	Le Chat	(France)
1979 (Note: Golden Plaque)	Julie Vincent	A Scream from Silence	(Canada)
1979	Vera Pap	Angi Vera	(Hungary)
1980	Marie Tifo	Les Bons débarras	(Canada)
1984	Louise Marleau	A Woman in Transit (La Femme de l'hôtel)	(Canada)
1985	Norma Aleandro	The Official Story	(Argentina)
1986 (Note: Best Performance)	Anna Lindén	Love Me!	(Sweden)
1988 (Note: Golden Plaque)	Natalya Negoda	Little Vera	(Soviet Union)
1989 (Note: Golden Plaque)	Imogen Stubbs	The Rainbow	(United Kingdom)
1990	Lena Stolze	The Nasty Girl	(Germany)
1992	Maggie Cheung	Center Stage	(British Hong Kong)
1993	Siqin Gaowa	Woman Sesame Oil Maker	(China)
1994	Crissy Rock	Ladybird, Ladybird	(United Kingdom)
1995	Anna Bonaiuto	Nasty Love	(Italy)
1996	Shabana Azmi	Fire	(India) (Canada)
1997	Pernilla August	Private Confessions	(Sweden)
1998	Alessandra Martines	Hasards ou coïncidences	(France) (Canada)
1999	Hilary Swank	Boys Don't Cry	(United States)
2000	Hannelore Elsner	Die Unberührbare	(Germany)
2001	Nicole Garcia, Sandrine Kiberlain	Betty Fisher et autres histoires	(France)
2003	Ludivine Sagnier	Little Lili	(France)
2005	Inka Friedrich, Nadja Uhl	Summer in Berlin	(Germany)
2006	Viktoriya Isakova, Darya Moroz, Anna Ukolova	The Spot	(Russia)
2007	Yu Nan	Tuya's Marriage	(China)
2008	Preity Zinta	Heaven on Earth	(India) (Canada)
2009	Giovanna Mezzogiorno	Vincere	(Italy)
2010	Liana Liberato	Trust	(United States)
2011	Olivia Colman	Tyrannosaur	(United Kingdom)
2012	Ulla Skoog	The Last Sentence	(Sweden)
2013	Nadeshda Brennicke	Banklady	(Germany)
2014	Geraldine Chaplin	Sand Dollars	(Dominican Republic)
2015	Lizzie Brocheré	Full Contact	(France)
2016	Rebecca Hall	Christine	(United Kingdom)
2017	Jowita Budnik; Eliane Umuhire	Birds Are Singing in Kigali	(Poland)
2018	Zhao Tao	Ash Is Purest White	(China)
2019	Debbie Honeywood	Sorry We Missed You	(United Kingdom)
2021 (Note: Best Performance)	Michelle Fairley	Nobody Has to Know	
2025	Eszter Tompa	Kontinental '25	(Romania)

== See also ==
- Chicago International Film Festival
