= Chicago International Film Festival =

Film festival in Chicago, Illinois, US

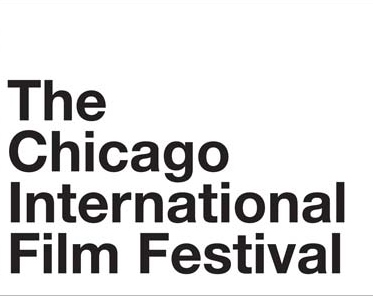
- Location: 212 W Van Buren St., Suite 400, Chicago, Illinois, United States
- Founded: 1965
- Most recent: 62nd Chicago International Film Festival
- Hosted by: Cinema/Chicago
- Language: International
- Website: chicagofilmfestival.com

The Chicago International Film Festival is an annual film festival held every fall. Founded in 1964 by filmmaker and graphic artist Michael Kutza, it is the longest-running competitive film festival in North America.

The Festival has a history of discovering and showcasing directors including Martin Scorsese, John Carpenter, Ava DuVernay, Hirokazu Kore-eda, Wim Wenders, and more.

In 2025, the Festival featured 150+ films from more than 50 countries over 12 days. Each year, the Festival welcomes more than 40,000 filmmakers and film lovers for 12 days of international and independent cinema.

Festival programming includes the International Competition, New Directors Competition, Documentary, Black Perspectives, After Dark, City & State, Shorts, and more. It is also an Academy Awards qualifying Festival in the categories of Best Live Action Short, Best Documentary Short, and Best Animated Short.

The Festival’s main venue is AMC NEWCITY 14. The Festival also hosts screenings across Chicago, including at Music Box Theatre, the Chicago History Museum, Gene Siskel Film Center, the Reva and David Logan Center for the Arts, Kennedy-King College, and the National Museum of Mexican Art.

== Black Perspectives Program ==
The Chicago International Film Festival’s Black Perspectives Program was founded in 1997 in collaboration with Spike Lee to highlight the excellence and diversity of African American cinema and films by the African diaspora from around the world. In addition to showcasing the work of emerging filmmakers, the program also features an annual tribute, with past honorees that include Viola Davis, Sidney Poitier, Halle Berry, Morgan Freeman, Steve McQueen, and more.

== Awards ==
Winners are awarded Hugo Awards (named after a mythological god of discovery "of shadowy origin"; not to be confused with the literary Hugo awards) in eight different competition categories.

- International Feature Film Competition
  - Gold Hugo
  - Silver Hugo: Jury Prize
  - Silver Hugo: Best Director
  - Silver Hugo: Best Actor (until 2019)
  - Silver Hugo Award for Best Actress (until 2019)
  - Silver Hugo: Best Performance (from 2020)
  - Silver Hugo: Best Ensemble Performance
  - Silver Hugo: Best Cinematography
  - Silver Hugo: Best Screenplay
  - Silver Hugo: Best Sound
  - Silver Hugo: Best Art Direction
- New Directors Competition

- Gold Hugo

- Silver Hugo
- Roger Ebert Award
- International Documentary Competition

- Gold Hugo

- Silver Hugo
- Out-Look Competition

- Gold Q-Hugo

- Silver Hugo
- City & State Competition
  - Chicago Award
- Live Action Short Film Competition

- Gold Hugo

- Silver Hugo
- Documentary Short Film Competition

- Gold Hugo

- Silver Hugo
- Animated Short Film Competition

- Gold Hugo

- Silver Hugo

== Gold Hugo ==
Year	Winning film	Director(s)	Country	Ref.
1965	The Lollipop Cover	Everett Chambers	United States	
1966	Bushido (Bushidō zankoku monogatari)	Tadashi Imai	Japan	
1967	Here's Your Life (Här har du ditt liv)	Jan Troell	Sweden	
1968	Innocence Unprotected (Nevinost bez zastite)	Dušan Makavejev	Yugoslavia	
1969	Eeny Meeny Miny Moe (Ole dole doff)	Jan Troell	Sweden	
1970	The Green Wall (La muralla verde)	Armando Robles Godoy	Peru	
1971	Mon oncle Antoine	Claude Jutra	Canada	
1972	Bleak Moments	Mike Leigh	United Kingdom	
1973	Mirage (Espejismo)	Armando Robles Godoy	Peru	
1973	Morgiana	Juraj Herz	Czechoslovakia	
1974	Pirosmani	Georgy Shengalaya	Soviet Union	
1975	Land of Promise (Ziemia obiecana)	Andrzej Wajda	Poland	
1976	Kings of the Road (Im Lauf der Zeit)	Wim Wenders	West Germany	
1977	The Huntsmen (Oi kynigoi)	Theo Angelopoulos	Greece	
1978	To an Unknown God (A un dios desconocido)	Jaime Chávarri	Spain	
1979	Angi Vera	Pál Gábor	Hungary	
1980	Camera Buff (Amator)	Krzysztof Kieślowski	Poland	
1981	The German Sisters (Die bleierne Zeit)	Margarethe von Trotta	West Germany	
1982	Come Back to the 5 & Dime, Jimmy Dean, Jimmy Dean	Robert Altman	United States	
1983	The South (El Sur)	Victor Erice	Spain; France	
1984	Khandhar (The Ruins)	Mrinal Sen	India	
1985	The Official Story (La historia oficial)	Luis Puenzo	Argentina	
1986	Welcome in Vienna (Wohin und zurück)	Axel Corti	Austria; West Germany; Switzerland	
1987	Whooping Cough (Szamárköhögés)	Péter Gárdos	Hungary	
1988	Little Vera (Malenkaya Vera)	Vasili Pichul	Soviet Union	
1989	Zerograd (Gorod Zero)	Karen Chakhnazarov	Soviet Union	
1990	Ju Dou	Zhang Yimou	China; Japan	
1991	Delicatessen	Jean-Pierre Jeunet and Marc Caro	France	
1992	Dream of Light (El sol del membrillo)	Victor Erice	Spain	
1993	Twinkle (Kira kira hikaru)	Joji Matsuoka	Japan	
1994	71 Fragments of a Chronology of Chance (71 Fragmente einer Chronologie des Zufalls)	Michael Haneke	Austria; Germany	
1995	Maborosi (Maboroshi no Hikari)	Hirokazu Koreeda	Japan	
1996	Ridicule	Patrice Leconte	France	
1997	The Winter Guest	Alan Rickman	United Kingdom	
1998	The Hole (Dong)	Tsai Ming-liang	Taiwan	
1999	Sachs' Disease (La maladie de Sachs)	Michel Deville	France	
2000	Amores perros	Alejandro González Iñárritu	Mexico	
2001	Fat Girl (À ma soeur!)	Catherine Breillat	France	
2002	Madame Satã	Karim Aïnouz	Brazil	
2003	Crimson Gold (Talaye Sorkh)	Jafar Panahi	Iran	
2004	Kontroll	Nimród Antal	Hungary	
2005	My Nikifor (Mój Nikifor)	Krzysztof Krauze	Poland	
2006	Fireworks Wednesday (Chaharshanbe Suri)	Asghar Farhadi	Iran	
2007	Silent Light (Stellet Lijcht)	Carlos Reygadas	Mexico	
2008	Hunger	Steve McQueen	Ireland	
2009	Mississippi Damned	Tina Mabry	United States	
2010	How I Ended This Summer (Kak ya provyol etim letom)	Alexei Popogrebski	Russia	
2011	Le Havre	Aki Kaurismäki	Finland	
2012	Holy Motors	Leos Carax	France	
2013	My Sweet Pepper Land	Huner Saleem	Iraq	
2014	The President	Mohsen Makhmalbaf	Georgia; France; United Kingdom; Germany	
2015	A Childhood	Philippe Claudel	France	
2016	Sieranevada	Cristi Puiu	Romania	
2017	A Sort of Family	Diego Lerman	Argentina	
2018	Happy as Lazzaro	Alice Rohrwacher	Italy; Switzerland; Germany; France	
2019	Portrait of a Lady on Fire	Céline Sciamma	France	
2020	Sweat	Magnus von Horn	Sweden	
2021	Memoria	Apichatpong Weerasethakul	Thailand; Colombia; Germany; France; Mexico; China	
2022	Godland	Hlynur Pálmason	Iceland; Denmark; France; Sweden	
2023	Explanation for Everything	Gábor Reisz	Hungary; Slovakia	
2024	Vermiglio	Maura Delpero	Italy; France; Belgium	
2025	Sirāt	Oliver Laxe	Spain; France	
2026	The Dreamed Adventure	Valeska Grisebach	Germany; France; Bulgaria; Austria	

== Silver Hugo ==
=== Jury Award ===
- 2026 – Everytime, dir. Sandra Wollner (Austria Germany)
- 2025 – The Voice of Hind Rajab, dir. Kaouther Ben Hania (Tunisia, France)
- 2024 – All We Imagine as Light, dir. Payal Kapadia (India)
- 2023 – The Delinquents, dir. Rodrigo Moreno (Argentina)
- 2022 – Close, dir. Lukas Dhont (Belgium)
- 2021 – Drive My Car, dir. Ryusuke Hamaguchi (Japan)
- 2020 – Careless Crime, dir. Shahram Mokri (Iran)
- 2019 – Vitalina Varela, dir. Pedro Costa (Portugal)

=== Best Director ===
- 2026 – Marine Atlan (France, Italy) for La Gradiva
- 2025 – Mascha Schilinski (Germany) for Sound of Falling
- 2024 – Miguel Gomes (Portugal) for Grand Tour
- 2023 – Aki Kaurismäki (Finland) for Fallen Leaves
- 2022 – Maryam Touzani (Morocco) for The Blue Caftan
- 2021 – Peter Kerekes (Slovakia) for 107 Mothers
- 2020 – Andrei Konchalovsky (Russia) for Dear Comrades!
- 2019 – Maya Da-Rin (Brazil) for The Fever

=== Best Actor ===
- 2025 – Wagner Moura (Brazil) for The Secret Agent
- 2024 – Benjamin Voisin (France) for The Quiet Son
- 2021 – Bouli Lanners (Belgium) for Nobody Has to Know
- 2019 – Bartosz Bielenia (Poland) for Corpus Christi
- 2018 – Jesper Christensen (Denmark) for Before the Frost
- 2017 – Aleksandr Yatsenko (Russia) for Arrhythmia
- 2016 – Adrian Titieni (Romania) for Graduation
- 2015 – Alexi Mathieu and Jules Gauzelin (France) for A Childhood
- 2014 – Anton Yelchin (USA) for Rudderless
- 2013 – Robert Wieckiewicz (Poland) for Walesa: Man of Hope
- 2012 – Denis Lavant (France) for Holy Motors
- 2011 – Maged El Kedwany (Egypt) for 678
- 2010 – Youssouf Djaoro (Chad) for A Screaming Man
- 2009 – Filippo Timi (Italy) for Vincere
- 2008 – Michael Fassbender (Ireland) for Hunger
- 2007 – Sam Riley (United Kingdom) for Control
- 2006 – Jürgen Vogel (Germany) for The Free Will
- 1989 – Jörg Gudzuhn (GDR) for Fallada, letztes Kapitel
- 1987 – Avtandil Makharadze (Georgia) for Monanieba
- 1972 – José Luis López Vázquez (Spain) for My Dearest Senorita
- 1971 – José Luis López Vázquez (Spain) for The Ancines Woods

=== Best Actress ===
- 2025 – Eszter Tompa (Romania) for Kontinental '25
- 2024 – Elín Hall (Iceland) for When the Light Breaks
- 2021 – Michelle Fairley (Ireland) for Nobody Has to Know
- 2019 – Debbie Honeywood (UK) for Sorry We Missed You
- 2018 – Zhao Tao (China) for Ash Is Purest White
- 2017 – Jowita Budnik (Poland) and Eliane Umuhire (Rwanda) for Birds Are Singing in Kigali
- 2016 – Rebecca Hall (UK) for Christine
- 2015 – Lizzie Brocheré (France) for Full Contact
- 2014 – Geraldine Chaplin (United States) for Sand Dollars
- 2013 – Nadeshda Brennicke (Germany) for Banklady
- 2012 – Ulla Skoog (Sweden) for The Last Sentence
- 2011 – Olivia Colman (UK) for Tyrannosaur
- 2010 – Liana Liberato (USA) for Trust
- 2009 – Giovanna Mezzogiorno (Italy) for Vincere
- 2008 – Preity Zinta (India) for Heaven on Earth
- 2007 – Yu Nan (China) for Tuya's Marriage
- 2006 – Viktoriya Isakova, Darya Moroz, Anna Ukolova (Russia) for The Spot
- 2005 – Inka Friedrich, Nadja Uhl (Germany) for Summer in Berlin
- 2003 – Ludivine Sagnier (France) for Little Lili

=== Best Lead Performance ===
- 2026 – Yana Radeva (Bulgaria) for The Dreamed Adventure
- 2023 – Ilinca Manolache (Romania) for Do Not Expect Too Much From the End of the World
- 2022 – Vicky Krieps (Luxembourg) for Corsage
- 2020 – Yakusho Koji (Japan) for Under the Open Sky

=== Best Supporting Performance ===
- 2026 – Lotte Shirin Keiling (Germany) for Everytime

=== Best Ensemble Performance ===
- 2026 – The cast of La Gradiva

=== Best Screenplay ===
- 2026 – Ryûsuke Hamaguchi & Léa Le Dimna (Japan, France) for All of a Sudden
- 2025 – Paolo Sorrentino (Italy) for La grazia
- 2024 – Mohammad Rasoulof (Iran) for The Seed of the Sacred Fig
- 2023 – Gábor Reisz and Éva Schulze (Hungary) for Explanation for Everything
- 2022 – Alice Diop, Amrita David, and Marie NDiaye (France) for Saint Omer
- 2021 – Alexandre Koberidze (Georgia) for What Do We See When We Look at the Sky?
- 2020 – Christos Nikou and Stavros Raptis (Greece) for Apples
- 2019 – Pema Tseden (China) for Balloon

=== Best Editing ===
- 2024 – Telmo Churro and Pedro Filipe Marques (Portugal) for Grand Tour

=== Best Cinematography ===
- 2026 – Senzo Ueno (Japan) for Look Back
- 2025 – Gergely Pálos (Hungary) for Silent Friend
- 2023 – Hélène Louvart (France) for La Chimera
- 2022 – Maria von Hausswolff (Iceland) for Godland
- 2021 – Kasper Tuxen (Denmark) for The Worst Person in the World
- 2020 – Tobie Marier Robitaille (Canada) for Night of the Kings
- 2019 – Vladimír Smutný (Czech Republic) for The Painted Bird

=== Best Sound ===
- 2025 – Sound of Falling (Germany)

=== Best Art Direction ===
- 2022 – Marcela Gómez and Daniel Rincon (Colombia) for The Kings of the World
- 2021 – Sergey Fevralev (Russia) for Captain Volkonogov Escaped
- 2020 – Jagna Dobesz (Poland) for Sweat

=== Best Visual Effects ===
- 2026 – The Spiral (Italy, France, Belgium)

=== Best New Director ===
- 2023 – Ena Sendijarević (Netherlands) for Sweet Dreams
- 2022 – Ann Oren (Germany) for Piaffe

=== Special Mention ===
- 2025 – My Father's Shadow
- 2024 – Ensemble Performance for On Becoming a Guinea Fowl

== Lifetime Achievement Awards ==
Winners of the festival's Lifetime Achievement Award include Steven Spielberg, Helen Hunt, Dustin Hoffman, Martin Landau, Shirley MacLaine, Lord Richard Attenborough, François Truffaut, Jodie Foster, Sigourney Weaver, Robin Williams, Manoel de Oliveira, and Clint Eastwood.

== Career Achievement Awards ==
- Marlon Wayans, Cheryl Dunye (2026)
- Bruce Dern (2013)
- Terrence Howard (2005)
- Susan Sarandon (2005)
- Shirley MacLaine (2005)
- Robert Zemeckis (2004)
- Irma P. Hall, Robert Townsend and Harry J. Lennix (2004)
- Annette Bening (2004)
- Robin Williams (2004)
- Nicolas Cage (2003)

== Television awards ==
The Television Awards started with the idea of honoring television commercials in a special event of the film festival, but over time evolved and grew into a bigger event, comprising not only commercials but also television productions, series, and online television. In 2003, a separate ceremony was launched for the TV awards, and in 2017, the event became a separate event, named the Chicago International Television Festival. Winners and runners-up for the various categories, which include Gold and Silver Hugos, are listed on the film festival website.

== See also ==
- Chicago International Children's Film Festival
- Chicago International Documentary Film Festival
- Chicago International REEL Shorts Festival
- Chicago Underground Film Festival
- List of film festivals
