= Off Camera International Festival of Independent Cinema =

Polish film festival

PKO Off Camera
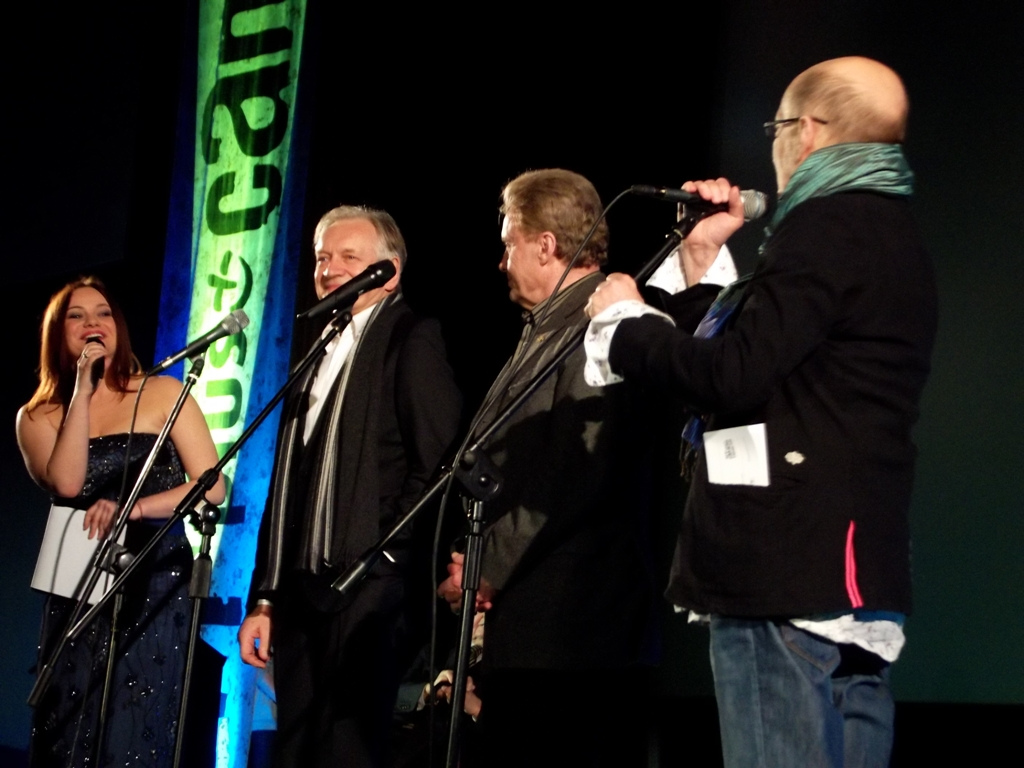
- Off Camera, Kraków, 2012. On stage: Andrzej Seweryn, Daniel Olbrychski, Wojciech Pszoniak

International Festival of Independent Cinema Off Camera is a film festival held in Kraków, Poland, with up to 400 screenings annually, seminars, international stars, guests and jury. It is the first event of its kind in the country based on creative dialog between world experts representing other independent film competitions such as the Sundance Film Festival and CineVegas, as well as festivals in Bangkok, Berlin, Buenos Aires, Busan, Dubai, Kolkata, Los Angeles, Reykjavík, Rotterdam, Toronto, and Venice. It is a festival of festivals with official backing from the City of Kraków with dozens of international sponsors and prominent partners including Poland's Ministry of Culture and National Heritage, Lufthansa, Mercedes-Benz and Sony. In 2008–2014 the official name was "Off Plus Camera", since 2015 it is "PKO Off Camera".

The festival consists of film screenings in studio movie theatres located within the Old Town. The organizer of the event is the Society for Independent and Similar Arts Off Camera (Stowarzyszenie Sztuki Niezależnej i Nie Tylko Off Camera) as one of the city's "Six Senses" (Sześć Zmysłów) programme of sponsoring artistic life in Kraków. The Festival organizers invite young filmmakers from all over the world, directors, actors and film industry experts to meet the audience and take advantage of getting their feedback in person. Szymon Miszczak is the director of the Festival and Ania Trzebiatowska is the artistic director. Off Plus Camera program showcases newest work by world-class directors as well as retrospectives of the most distinguished artists of independent cinema from the past.

== Main dramatic competition "Making Way" ==
The most important event of the Off Plus Camera Festival is its Main Competition named "Making Way" (Wytyczanie drogi). In it, the films from all over the world compete for the Kraków Film Award in the sum of $100,000 presented by the President of the City of Kraków. The main criteria for the rating by the festival programmers are the quality and the artistic merit of the films, the use of traditional and avant-garde filming techniques as well as the directors' sensibilities and artistic maturity in their productions.

In 2009, 12 films from 8 countries qualified for the Competition. The winner was chosen by the international Jury, whose members were Allison Anders, Zbigniew Preisner, Max Farberbock, Fernando Trueba and Andriej Zwiagincew and the prize went to Sebastian Silva for the movie La Nana. The winner was also given 1, 000, 000 Polish zlotys from the Polish Film Institute for the production of his next film in Poland.

According to the main theme, "Making Way", the Kraków Film Award is meant to make it more likely for the winner to shoot their next movie. That is exactly what happened in the case of the winner of the first edition of Off Plus Camera. In 2008 the Kraków Film Award went to the American director, Azazel Jacobs for his film Momma’s Man. Thanks to the prize he was able to start working on the next project. Sebastian Silva has similar plans and he wants to work on the script telling a story of the sirens.

Marek Najbrt, whose picture, Protector, won the Kraków Film Award of the third edition of the festival, made Polish Film in Kraków as a part of his winner's deal. The premiere of the production took place in 2014 in Karlovy Vary. The winner of the fourth edition of the festival was Park-Jung Bum, who won for his film The Journals of Musan. In 2012 the award went to the Danish director Mads Matthiesen for the movie Teddy Bear. Marcin Kryształowicz won the sixth edition of Off Plus Camera for his film Manhunt.

=== Polish Feature Film Competition ===
The first edition of the Competition meant for the Poland's producers was held in 2011 and showcased 10 feature films. Polish Film Noble was given to Marcin Wrona for his movie The Christening.

In 2012 the Award went to Leszek Dawid for his film Ki. In 2013 the winner was Bejbi Blues by Katarzyna Rosłaniec.

== Event history ==
=== Off Plus Camera 2008 ===
The first edition of the festival started on 1 October 2008. The main prize (for the best first feature film) was €100,000. The festival opened with a concert by Czesław Śpiewa, and the opening film was Golden Palm-winner "Class". The following days of the festival brought us numerous screenings of artistic movies and Q & As. The festival club was held in the building of the Main Train Station Of Kraków and it hosted a couple of indie music concerts. Bonobo, Giles Peterson, Pati Yang as well as Polish and European DJs performed there.

Due to the retrospective of Andy Warhol and Paul Morrisey special guests visited Kraków. The press conference with Paul Morrisey, Warhol's manager for many years and director of his movies was held at the festival center. Holly Woodlawn, actress and a famous drag queen and Mary Woronov, actress and Warhol's friend from the Factory period also made appearances. The guests introduced their films and participated in the meeting with Krystian Lupa and his actors who star in the play "Factory 2" at the National Stary Theatre. The Closing Gala was a moment when Zbigniew Preisner introduced the members of the Jury. Hector Babenco, Michael Almerreyda and Petr Zelenka appeared on the stage. Holly Woodlawn performed a song "Walk on the Wild Side", in which Lou Reed originally sings about her. Jacek Majchrowski, president of the City of Kraków, handed the award to Azazel Jacobs. Critics’ Award, Polish Film Noble, sponsored by Noble Bank went to another American, Alex Holdridge.

Over 100 movies were shown and almost 400 screenings were held. Lectures and seminars were organized as well. There was also a competition for the films shot with a cell phone and over several hundred people participated in them. The starting inspirations for these short films were ideas by Polish artists: Kasia Nosowska, Maria Peszek, Olga Tokarczuk, Maciej Maleńczuk and Szymon Majewski, to name just a few of them.

=== Off Plus Camera 2009 ===
The Main Competition presented first and second features from all over the world, including Chilean "La Nana" – the winner of Sundance 2009 festival and "Gigante" – the winner of three prizes in Berlin. "The Messenger" starring Woody Harrelson and Ben Foster was also screened at the festival. Section Discoveries showcased new films made in 2008 and 2009, including "A Christmas Tale", starring Catherine Deneuve and her daughter, Chiara Mastroianni.

Catching Up was a section inspired by Jerzy Płażewski's essay, an approach to make the Polish audiences familiar with these productions that were not distributed across the theatres. Therefore, it was a very first chance to see Ira Sachs’ "Forty Shades of Blue" and Larisa Sadilowa's "I Love You, Lilia" on the big screen. The latest independent cinema from the US and Latin American was presented in the sections From the Gut and Discoveries: Latino. Jean-Luc Godard retrospective was held and the special guest of this part of the festival was his ex-wife, Anna Karina.

=== Off Plus Camera 2010 ===
Due to the national mourning, the very first days of the festival were cancelled and the explosion of a volcano in Iceland that caused flight problems influenced some program changes. The third winner of the Kraków Film Award was Marek Najbrt for his Czech movie, "Protector". Polish Film Noble, given by the critics, went to Kyle Patrick Alvarez for his film "Easier with Practice". The Audience Award went to the Opening Film – Dagur Kari's "Good Heart". Jane Campion, the director of "Bright Star", that was shown at the festival, was given Against the Current Award, to honor her art in the international landscape of independent cinema. Three winners of three different "Take It and Make It" competitions for movies shot with a cell phone, a camera or a video recorder, were selected. The best L’OFF STORY title went to Bartek Tryzna's "Mateusz and Marta". ALLEGRO SHORT FILM winner was Julia Sokolnicka for "Z głowy" and TVN24 Report category winner was Bartłomiej Słabicki for his video relation of a rescue action in the middle of a frozen river.

=== Off Plus Camera 2011 ===
The 4th International Festival of Independent Cinema Off Plus Camera lasted 10 days and was held between 8 and 17 April. The Festival Centre was located at Kino pod Baranami cinema at the Kraków's Main Square. Peter Weir added splendour to the 4th Opening Gala of the International Festival of Independent Cinema Off Plus Camera. Radosław Sikorski, Polish Minister of Foreign Affairs, presented him with the Order of Merit of the Republic of Poland. During the Gala there was the premiere of the last picture by Weir, "The Way Back".

The one to win the Kraków Film Award, the main prize in the competition, was Park Jung-bum for his "Musan il-gy". For the first time at Off Plus Camera Polish Film Nobles were presented in the Polish Feature Film Competition. The price went to Marcin Wrona for his film "The Christening" (Chrzest). The films were evaluated by the international Jury comprising Rose McGowan (the head of the Jury), Ellen Chenoweth, Roger Christian, Andrei Plakhov and Kim Dong-Ho.

During the 4th edition of the festival the FIPRESCI award was granted for the first time. Jury comprising Ronald Bergan (the head of the Jury), Tomislav Sakic and Krzysztof Kwiatkowski distinguished Jan Komasa's film "Suicide Room" (Sala samobójców). The audience award was presented to a Polish film, "Heniek" by Eliza Kowalewska.

The "Against the Current" award was handed out to Tim Roth by the head of the Main Competition Jury, Jerzy Skolimowski. SCRIPT PRO awards in the scriptwriting competition organised by the Wajda School and Off Plus Camera were also presented. Wiktor Kubica from Groń won the HBO Main Prize for a script to a film "Prescription" (Recepta). The winner was also presented with the out-of-the-competition Special Award founded by the Catalyst Holding Group. The Polish Film Institute was the sponsor of the second and the third prizes which were presented to Maksymilian Nowicki, the author of the script to "Sneaker Time" (Czas trampek), and Piotr Chrzan, who wrote "Tapping Bird" (Ptak-Klepak) respectively.

In the Take it & Make it competition, which takes place under the auspices of the festival, the awards were distributed in three categories. The winner in the "You Plus Festival" category was Paweł Soja for his film "Talk to Her" (Porozmawiaj z nią). The best "TV Bulletin for TVN24" award was given to Konrad Skiba for his film "Constructing Pier Without Assurance" (Budowa molo bez zabezpieczeń). In the "Allegro Short Film" category the award was presented to the "Single Player" by Paweł Soja, whereas in the subcategory of the "Allegro Short Film. Idea" there was a join prize presented to Artur Długokęcki for his "God Permitting" (Jak Bóg da) and Bartek Tryzna's "Second Head".

Numerous workshops and industry meetings took place during the festival with Roger Christian's Art Director workshops, Ellen Chenoweth's Casting Director workshops, Constantine Gregory's acting workshops, Wojtek Pałys's "First Film" workshops, Filip Kovcin's from FILM PRO "Reflex cameras in action" workshops, "Alternative sources of distribution" lecture by Christian Gaine, a meeting of co-producers, a discussion panel "How to debut?" and Ronald Bergan's lecture on film criticism.

Among the accompanying events of the 4th edition of Off Plus Camera there were: Jerzy Skolimowski's "Essential" vernissage, Michael Gibson and Lech Majewski's lecture on "The Mill and the Cross" (Młyn i krzyż), concerts of The Cliks as well as American guitarist, Gary Luckas, who performed live to the famous "Spanish Dracula" film from 1931. During Off Plus Camera the solemn premiere of Janusz Majewski's "Little Baccaulaureate 1947" (Mała matura 1947) was also held. What was new during that edition of Off Plus Camera was "Roofing in Kraków". For the first time the festival goers participated in exquisite film screenings at the rooftops of Kraków's old houses. The section was organised under the auspices of the Rooftop Film Festival and its artistic director, Mark Rosenberg.

=== Off Plus Camera 2012 ===
The 5th International Festival of Independent Cinema Off Plus Camera lasted 10 days and was held between 13 and 22 April. The Opening Gala of the 5th edition was held in the Kraków Opera. A special guest, Azazel Jacobs, the laureate of the first edition of Off Plus Camera and David Thewlis, who gathered the "Against the Current" award (which has been granted since 2010 to the individuals who are of outstanding merit in the realm of independent cinema) graced the Opening Gala with their presence. The Gala also served as an opportunity to hand out the awards to the winners of competitions organised under the ID FILM project, including the "Take It & Make It" which accompanies the festival from the very beginning. The performance of Czesław Mozil added splendour to the inauguration.

Danish director Mads Matthiesen won the Main Competition owing to his film "Teddy Bear". Apart from the cash award amounting to US$100 thousand, he was also presented with a 1 million PLN cheque from the Polish Film Institute to be realised on condition that his next production will be set in Poland. Andrzej Żuławski was the head of the Main Competition Jury in 2012. He was accompanied by Josh Radnor (a "Camera On" meeting with him was extremely popular among the festival goers), Tom Kalin and Colleen Atwood.

The award in the Polish Feature Film Competition, the Polish Film Noble amounting to 100 thousand PLN was presented to Leszek Dawid for his film "Ki" with which he defeated the remaining seven competitors. The films were evaluated by the international Jury comprising Michael Radford, Margery Simkin, Oren Moverman, Stephanie Zacharek and James Spring. The FIPRESCI award was granted for the second time in the history of the festival. The lucky one who was honoured with this award was Rebecca Thomas with her "Electrick Children". The winner was selected by the members of the Jury including Eithne O’Neill, Maricke Nieuwdorp and Anita Piotrowska. The audience award was granted to Jonathan Levine for his picture, "50/50".

The special guest of the festival was Luc Besson. The Polish premiere of his film "The Lady" took place at Off Plus Camera. Roland Joffé, whose production "There Be Dragons" also premiered at the festival, graced the 5th edition with his presence. The director was handed the keys to the city by the president of Kraków, Jacek Majchrowski.

The 5th edition of Off Plus Camera was accompanied by the celebration of the 10th anniversary of the Wajda School founding. On that occasion, Volker Schlöndorff made a speech, while in the special festival section there were screenings of the best films produced by the Wajda School. The results of the SCRIPT PRO competition were also announced. The winner of the first prize was Dariusz Glazer for the script to "Wall" (Mur).

During the 3rd day of the festival digitally reconstructed "Promised Land" (Ziemia obiecana) by Andrzej Wajda had its premiere. Such individuals as Andrzej Wajda, Wojciech Pszoniak, Andrzej Seweryn, Daniel Olbrychski, Witold Sobociński, Bożena Dykiel, Emilia Krakowska, Adam Kopczyński, Andrzej Łapicki, Jerzy Domaradzki, Maciej Putowski, Barbara Ptak, Anna Nehrebecka, Michał Ratyński and Andrzej Kotowski graced the screening with their presence.

Many industry workshops touching upon such issues as organisation of film festivals, stages of film production, secrets of casting or the future of computer games were organised within the Off Plus Camera Academy. The workshops were conducted by David Kwok, Emily Gotto, Jarosław Kamiński, Volker Schlondorff, Brandon Harris, Margery Simkin, Roland Joffé, Kevin B. Lee and Rafał Stanowski.

=== Off Plus Camera 2013 ===
The Opening Gala was honored with presence of an excellent director, Costa-Gavras. The audience gathered at the Kijów.Centrum cinema had a chance to watch the premiere of his new film, "Le Capital".

The jury comprising Lech Majewski (the head of the jury), Udo Kier, John Rhys-Davies and Ruth Myers granted US$100,000 and Kraków Film Award to Marcin Krzyształowicz for "Manhunt". Polish director was also promised a grant amounting to 1,000,000 PLN from the Polish Film Institute. The jury decided to hand out the second award ("Ombline" by Stéphane Cazes) as well as special recognitions ("Soldate Jeannette" by Daniel Hoesl and "Upstream Color" by Shane Carruth). The Jury of the International Federation of Film Critics FIPRESCI gave its award to Stéphane Cazes for the film, "Ombline". The film also received the youth jury award. It included junior high school students and high school students, who won a competition to write a film review as part of a social action of the Polish Film Institute, "Skrytykuj" ("Criticize").

In the Polish Feature Film competition, the Award was handed out by Melissa Leo (the head of the jury), Jeanne McCarthy and Brady Corbet. Polish Film Noble went to "Bejbi blues" – film made by Katarzyna Rosłaniec (director) and Agnieszka Kurzydło (producer). Audience Award of the 6th edition of the International Festival of Independent Cinema Off Plus Camera was given to "A Late Quartet" by Yaron Zilberman. For the first time in the history of the festival, the awards of 10 000 PLN were granted to the best actress and best actor! The winners were Magdalena Berus for roles in the films: "Nieulotne" ("Lasting") and "Bejbi blues" and Tomasz Schuchardt for his role in the film "You are God".

During the Closing Gala, a prestigious ‘Against the Current’ Award, presented to outstanding film figures for their contribution to independent cinema and promotion of independent culture, was handed out as well. This year it went to Melissa Leo. An actress left a special imprint of her hands on a special plate, which will be located in the Kraków Walk of Fame.

The festival included more than 250 screenings in 7 projection rooms and 6 cinemas. The festival cinemas were visited by 29 500 viewers, which is a record number in the history of the Off Plus Camera. The festival gathered more than 300 Polish and foreign guests from the US, Germany, France, Denmark, Austria, South Korea, Romania, Portugal, Croatia, Italy, the UK and Ireland. Directors, producers, screenwriters, cinematographers, journalists, actors and film critics were among guests of the festival. Obviously, the Off Plus Camera was also visited by representatives of the Polish film industry such as Agnieszka Odorowicz, Włodzimierz Niederhaus, Piotr Kobus, Bodo Kox, Jacek Borcuch, Sławomir Fabicki, Andrzej Jakimowski, Anna Wieczur-Bluszcz, Gabriela Muskała, Katarzyna Herman, Marcin Krzyształowicz, Piotr Głowacki and many others. Five meetings of from the Camera On series were held during this year's edition of the festival – including meetings with Josh Hartnett, Melissa Leo, Costa-Gavras, Lech Majewski and John Rhys-Davies. The new elements of this year's edition of the Off Plus Camera were film screenings and panel discussions shown in 13 cinemas in 11 cities of Małopolska as part of the project "Off Plus Camera in Your Town". The festival, together with Legalna Kultura (Legal Culture), presented seven screenings as part of, "Cinema on the Rooftop". A special program for parents with children was prepared, as part of a series "Off Mama”. Nine bands performed on the Off Stage at the festival club B4. The program of the Off Plus Camera Pro Industry comprised 12 workshops and industry meetings. It invited such panelists as Sławomir Idziak, David Kwok, Izabela Kiszka, Nick Moran, Shade Rupe, Agnieszka Kurzydło, Katarzyna Ślesicka and Kim Yutani. The festival also presented a digitally reconstructed version of Krzysztof Kieślowski's "Blind Chance". The screening was honored with the presence of Boguslaw Linda, Marzena Trybała, Michał Żarnecki, Monica Goździk and Bogusława Pawelec.

=== Off Plus Camera 2014 ===
The seventh edition of the International Festival of Independent Cinema Off Plus Camera took place from May, 2 – 11. The Festival programme included 98 movies and 58 series episodes. The screenings took place in six cinemas: Kino.Kijów, Mikro Cinema, Cinema Ars, Małopolski Ogród Sztuki Agrafka Cinema. As part of the “Roof-olution in Kraków”, the screenings were held on the roofs of buildings on the Pijarska Street as well as Słowacki Avenue. The screenings were held on the boat during the cruise on the Vistula River, in the direction to Tyniec.

In the second edition of the project "Off Plus Camera in Your Town" in eleven cities of Małopolska there were screenings of selected titles from the programme.

Special film projections were prepared for parents with children, as part of the "Off Family” series. In the course of 10 days of the festival there were used 32 000 tickets, and the list of invited guests, associated with the movies, included 350 people. For the first time there was organized a closed fashion project – "Off season: Showroom". It presented six Polish clothing brands. As part of the "Off Plus Camera Festival" there was presented a series of industry events for professionals within the framework of the "Off Camera Pro Industry Academy", which comprised panel discussions, workshops and lectures. The producers were presented with a "1: 1" initiative, in which foreign experts assessed projects during the implementation phase.

The Festival Centre was set up in the Pod Baranami Palace, and the Festival information Centre on the Main Square. The productions from the competition were selected in January. Admissions for a full-length scripts for the Script Pro competition finished in February. On 23 Feb., admissions for the seventh edition of the competition for non-professional filmmakers "Take It & Make It" started. It is also one of the festival's accompanying events.

Out of more than 1600 entries, as many as 380 volunteers were selected in March. In the course of the Festival they worked in ten departments. On 13 March, first sections, which were debuting in the programme, were revealed. From 25 March, there were presented official announcements of the individual sections of the programme.

For the first time, Polish Audiovisual Producers Chamber of Commerce (KIPA), has founded the award for the best debut production. On April, 10 Polish artists of the "Off Stage" were disclosed. Festival calendar with full programme and the possibility to purchase tickets for the screenings was presented on April, 20.

Winners

- Kraków Film Award – Eastern Boys, directed by Robin Campillo
- Awards for actors – Carla Juri for her role in "Wetlands" and Marius Kolbenstvedt for his role in "Blind"
- Polish Film Noble – Ida directed by Pawel Królikowski
- Special recognition – Papusza, directed by Joanna Kos-Krauze and Krzysztof Krauze
- Award for best actress – Dorota Kolak for her role in the film Life Feels Good
- Award for best actor – Mateusz Banasiuk for his role in Floating Skyscrapers
- FIPRESCI Award – Blind directed by Eskil Vogt
- Youth Jury Award – Viktoria directed by Maia Vitkova
- Audience Award – Wetlands directed by David Wnendt
- Against the Current Award – Benedict Cumberbatch
- Best producer – Olga Bieniek and Mirosław Piepka for "The Closed Circuit" directed by Ryszard Bugajski
- Honorary recognition – Piotr Kielar for "Love" directed by Filip Dzierżawski

Script Pro

- The top Award of PKO Bank Polski went to Bartosz M. Kowalski and Stanisław Warwas for the script for "Plac zabaw" (Playground).
- Second Award of Polish Film Institute – Julia Kowalski for the script of the "Lost"
- Third Award of Polish Film Institute – Dominik Gąsiorowski and Bartosz Blaschkez's script entitled "Felicia and Jesus"
- Special Cinemax Award – Beata Waszkiewicz for her script entitled "Mother"

"Take It & Make It"

- A Journey to the past – Plus -"Marlena" directed by Rafal Małecki
- The difference is in the details – Sony – "Open your eyes" directed by Oscar Pospolitak
- Adrenaline shot – Lotto – "one love" directed by Lukasz Kowalski
- Additional prize – "White flight", directed by Szymon Jagodzki
- The Bulletin for TVN 24 – Michal Domachowski for "Revolution in Ukraine"
- Allegro Short Film – Katarzyna Latos for "THE GAME MACHINE"
- Allegro Short Lab – Natalia Juszka for “Music"

=== PKO Off Camera 2015 ===
The 8th edition of the International Festival of Independent PKO Cinema Off Camera will take place on May 2–11, 2015.

== International Jury ==
During the first three editions of the festival, Zbigniew Preisner was the head of the jury.

2008 Jury

- Hector Babenco – South-American director, of Polish and Ukrainian origin, famous for an Oscar-winning Kiss of the Spider-Woman
- Michael Almereyda – New York-based director whose Hamlet with Ethan Hawke was nominated to the Oscar in the category Best Actor
- Petr Zelenka – Czech director, author of the adaptation of Brothers Karamazov, co-produced by Poland

2009 Jury

- Allison Anders – American director nominated to the Golden Bear and Sundance Festival Main Dramatic Award, together with Quentin Tarantino she co-directed Four Rooms, the director of Sex and the City
- Trevor Groth – Programming Director of Sundance Film Festival, founded 25 years ago in a winter health resort in Utah, by Robert Redford
- Fernando Trueba – Spanish director and producer, his movie Belle Époque, starring Penélope Cruz, won the Oscar for the Best Foreign Language Film
- Max Farberbock – German film and television director, the author of Aimée and Jaguar and The Woman in Berlin
- Andrey Zvyagintsev – director of The Return and The Banishment

2010 Jury

- John Cooper – director of the Sundance Film Festival
- Mike Figgis – director, producer, musician, writer. His most-well known films are Guilty Pleasure, Leaving Las Vegas and Love Live Long. His music and directing credits include: Miss Julie, for which he was also nominated to the Venice Golden Lion and One Night Stand.
- Petr Zelenka – Czech director and scriptwriter, his most famous films are Karamazov Brothers, Wrong Side Up.
- Brandon Harris – film critic, writer, director and film producer.

2011 Jury

- Jerzy Skolimowski – head of the jury, scriptwriter, director, awarded with the Golden Bear at Berlinale for his film Le depart. His latest picture – Essential Killing – is widely acclaimed by the international critics and audiences.
- Elvis Mitchell – one of the most influential film critics in the US. He collaborates with Fort Worth Star-Telegram, LA Weekly, The Detroit Press and The New York Times.
- Jill Sprecher – director and scriptwriter. She directed such films as Clockwatchers and Thirteen Conversations About One Ting. She is also a producer of the TV show Big Love.
- Saverio Costanzo – Italian director and scriptwriter. Known for his movies In Memory of Myself and The Solitude of Prime Numbers

Polish Feature Film Competition

- Rose McGowan – head of the jury, actress known for The Doom Generation, Jawbreaker, Scream, Death Proof and TV show Charmed
- Ellen Chenoweth – one of the best casting director in Hollywood. She was in charge of castings such movies as: Burn After Reading, A Serious Man, No Country for Old Men and Changeling
- Roger Christian – set designer, awarded with the Oscar for the fourth installment of The Star Wars. He also worked on Alien and Life of Brian
- Andrei Stepanovich Plakhov – Russian film critic and film historian. Since 2005 the president of FIPRESCI – International Federation of Film Critics.
- Kim Dong-Ho – an expert on the world cinema and the founder of Pusan International Film Festival.

2012 Jury

- Andrzej Żuławski – head of the jury, director, scriptwriter, actor and novelist. He directed such films as: Possession, On the Silver Globe, The Public Woman, The Important Thing Is To Love, Szamanka
- Josh Radnor – actor, director, scriptwriter. He gained enormous popularity thanks to the role of Ted Mosby in the show How I Met Your Mother. He made his directorial debut with the film Happythankyoumoreplease
- Tom Kalin – scriptwriter, director, producer, one of the most important representatives of the New Queer Cinema. He also teaches experimental film at European Graduate School in Saas-Fee.
- Colleen Atwood – American costume designer. She worked on such movies as: Edward Scissorhands, Ed Wood, Sweeny Todd, Chicago, Nine, Memoirs of a Geisha and Mars-Attacks!

Polish Feature Film Competition Jury

- Michael Radford – British director and scriptwriter. He directed Nineteen Eighty-Four, based on George Orwell's novel and The Postman
- Margery Simkin – casting director. She cast such productions as: Erin Brockovich, Avatar, Pacific Rim and Twelve Monkeys
- Oren Moverman – Israeli director, scriptwriter and journalist. He made his directorial debut in 2009 with the movie The Messenger
- Stephanie Zacharek – one of the best film critics in the US. She writes for The New York Times, Los Angeles Times, Entertainment Weekly, Rolling Stone, New York Magazine
- James Spring – executive director of the Ealing Studios. He produced such pictures as: Dorian Gray, Burke and Hare, From Time to Time, Easy Virtue

Jury 2013

- Lech Majewski – head of the jury, theatre and film director, poet, writer and painter
- Udo Kier – actor famous for the roles of Dracula and Frankenstein. He also starred in such films as Blade, Armageddon as well as Madonna's video for Deeper and Deeper
- John Rhys-Davies – British actor, famous for the role of the dwarf Gimli in the trilogy Lord of the Rings
- Ruth Myers – British costume designer, nominated to the Oscar for Emma and The Addams Family. She won the Emmy Award for the costumes in TV show Carnivale

Polish Feature Film Competition Jury

- Melissa Leo – actress, she won the Oscar for her role in The Fighter. She starred in such acclaimed films as Frozen River and 21 grams as well as numerous TV shows – Miami Vice, Law and Order, All My Children
- Jeanne McCarthy – casting director. She cast such films as: Mars-Attacks!, Eternal Sunshine of the Spotless Mind, Ghost Rider, One Night at McCool's, The Ice Harvest, Sweet Home Alabama
- Brady Corbet – actor, famous for the role of Mason Freeland in the drama Thirteen, he also starred in Mysterious Skin and Melancholia

== Festival Guests ==
Guests from all around the world were invited to the festival. Hollywood and its more independent universe were represented by actors Seymour Cassel, Lea Thompson and Christopher McDonald. The special guest of a section devoted to Jean-Luc Godard films was his ex-wife and the icon of the French New Wave, Anna Karina.

Kraków also hosted: actress Melonie Diaz, agent of the stars and producer Allan Mindel and director Tom Kalin. Polish Brothers, Michael and Mark came for the closing of the festival, straight from Tribeca IFF in NYC. The section Bridge of Cultures hosted such guests as Kim Dong Ho, the founder and director of Pusan Film Festival and Riz Khan, the co-creator of BBC World and now a director of the TV channel Al Jazeera in the US.

The special guests of the third edition of Off Plus Camera (2010) included: Jane Campion, Mike Figgis.

The special guests of the fourth edition of Off Plus Camera (2011) included: Peter Weir, Tim Roth, Amitabh Bachchan, Richard Jenkins, Rose McGowan, Jill Sprecher, Ellen Chenoweth, Roger Christian, Kim Dong-Ho, Ronald Bergan, Elvis Mitchell.

The special guests of the fifth edition of Off Plus Camera (2012) included: Luc Besson, David Thewlis, Roland Joffé, Volker Schlondorff, Michael Radford, Andrzej Żuławski, Josh Radnor, Aidan Gillen.

The special guests of the sixth edition of Off Plus Camera (2013) included: Josh Hartnett, John Rhys-Davies, Udo Kier, Melissa Leo, Lech Majewski, Costa-Gavras, Bogusław Linda.

== See also ==
- Cinema of Poland
