= Papusza (film) =

Film by Krzysztof Krauze and Joanna Kos-Krauze

- Film poster
- Directed by: Joanna Kos-Krauze; Krzysztof Krauze
- Written by: Joanna Kos-Krauze; Krzysztof Krauze
- Produced by: Lambros Ziotas
- Starring: Jowita Budnik; Zbigniew Waleryś; Antoni Pawlicki
- Cinematography: Krzysztof Ptak; Wojciech Staroń
- Edited by: Krzysztof Szpetmański
- Music by: Jan Kanty Pawluśkiewicz
- Production companies: Argomedia Sp. z o.o. Polish Television – Film Agency (co-production); Canal+ (co-production); KADR (co-production)
- Distributed by: Next Film
- Release date: July 1, 2013
- Running time: 126 minutes
- Country: Poland
- Languages: Romani; Polish
- Box office: $567,530

Papusza is 2013 Polish feature film directed by Joanna Kos-Krauze and Krzysztof Krauze, starring Jowita Budnik as lead actress.

The plot revolves around the biography of Romani poet Bronisława Wajs, better known as Papusza (Romani: Lalka) within the Romani community. The film is black and white, with dialogue mainly in Romani.

== Cast ==
The cast is as follows:

- Jowita Budnik as Papusza (Bronisława Wajs)
- Zbigniew Waleryś as Dionizy Wajs
- Antoni Pawlicki as Jerzy Ficowski
- Andrzej Walden as Julian Tuwim
- Sebastian Wesołowski as Tarzan, son of Papusza
- Paloma Mirga as young Papusza
- Artur Steranko as "lieutenant" Czarnecki
- Karol Parno Gierliński as Śero Rom (Roma leader)
- Jerzy Gudejko as minister

== Awards ==
The film received several awards at national and international film festivals of 2013:

- Gdynia Film Festival – "Golden Kittens" award of the youth city council; best supporting actor (Zbigniew Waleryś); best makeup (Anna Nobel-Nobielska); best score (Jan Kanty Pawluśkiewicz)
- Karlovy Vary International Film Festival – special jury award
- "Manaki Brothers" International Film Festival – „Bronze Camera 300” award (Krzysztof Ptak and Wojciech Staroń)
- "Tadeusz Szymkow" Film Festival – "Golden Puppy" award for best supporting actor (Zbigniew Waleryś)
- Valladolid International Film Festival – young jury's award; best director (Joanna Kos-Krauze and Krzysztof Krauze); best actor (Zbigniew Waleryś)
- Thessaloniki International Film Festival – "Open Horizons" award
