= Birds Are Singing in Kigali =

2017 film

- Film poster
- Directed by: Joanna Kos-Krauze; Krzysztof Krauze
- Starring: Jowita Budnik; Eliane Umuhire
- Cinematography: Krzysztof Ptak; Józefina Gocma; Wojciech Staroń
- Music by: Paweł Szymański
- Release date: 4 July 2017 (KVIFF)
- Running time: 113 min
- Country: Poland
- Languages: Polish; English; Kinyarwanda
- Box office: $62 670

Birds Are Singing in Kigali (Polish: Ptaki śpiewają w Kigali) is a 2017 Polish drama film directed by Joanna Kos-Krauze and Krzysztof Krauze. The film tells the story of a Polish ornithologist who saves a Tutsi girl from certain death. Kos-Krauze completed the film after her husband died mid-production in 2014.

== Plot ==
The Polish ornithologist Anna Keller (Jowita Budnik) conducts research on vultures in Rwanda. Meanwhile, the conflict between the two population groups living in this country - Tutsi and Hutu, turns into the Tutsi genocide. Keller saves a young Rwandan (Eliane Umuhire) and takes her with him to Poland. It is a film about the power of nature, friendship and forgiveness.

== Cast ==
- Jowita Budnik as Anna Keller
- Eliane Umuhire as Claudine Mugambira
- Witold Wieliński as Witek

== Awards ==
Budnik and Umuhire received joint awards for the best actress at the 42nd Polish Film Festival and at the 52nd Karlovy Vary International Film Festival. At the Polish Film Festival in Gdynia, the Krauze couple received the Silver Lions for the film, and Katarzyna Leśniak received the award for the best editing.
