= Planet B (film) =

2024 film by Aude Léa Rapin

- Directed by: Aude Léa Rapin
- Written by: Aude Léa Rapin
- Produced by: Eve Robin
- Starring: Adèle Exarchopoulos; Souheila Yacoub; India Hair; Paul Beaurepaire; Eliane Umuhire
- Cinematography: Jeanne Lapoirie
- Edited by: Gabrielle Stemmer
- Music by: Bertrand Bonello
- Production companies: Les Films du Bal; Wrong Men; Le Pacte; France 3 Cinéma; Auvergne-Rhône-Alpes Cinéma; RTBF; VOO; Be tv; Proximus
- Distributed by: Le Pacte
- Release dates: August 29, 2024 (Venice); December 25, 2024 (France)
- Country: France
- Languages: English and French

Planet B (French: Planète B) is a 2024 dystopian science fiction thriller film directed and written by Aude Léa Rapin. The film stars Adèle Exarchopoulos as Julia Bombarth, an activist who awakens on a mysterious planet. It premiered on August 29, 2024 at the 81st Venice International Film Festival, serving as opening film of the Critics' Week sidebar.

== Premise ==
Julia, an activist, disappears after participating in a violent protest. After being shot by a flash-ball gun, Julia awakens on an unknown world, Planet B.

== Cast ==
- Adèle Exarchopoulos as Julia Bombarth
- Souheila Yacoub as Nour Hamdi
- India Hair as Victoire
- Paul Beaurepaire as Eloi Roudart
- Eliane Umuhire as Hermès
- Jonathan Couzinié as Gudane
- Théo Cholbi as Kylian
- Léo Chalié as Wendy
- Grace Seri as Ariel
- Amine Hamidou as Mehdi Allawi
- Yassine Stein as Ahmad
- Marc Barbé as Mileur
- Thierry Hancisse as Vano

== Production ==
Planet B began filming in March 2023 for 43 days in Saint-Raphaël, Var, Grenoble and Lyon, and finished in Île-de-France. The film was released by Le Pacte in France on 25 December 2024.
