= My Nikifor =

- Directed by: Krzysztof Krauze
- Written by: Krzysztof Krauze; Joanna Kos-Krauze; Jack Kelleher
- Starring: Krystyna Feldman; Roman Gancarczyk; Lucyna Malec
- Cinematography: Krzysztof Ptak
- Release dates: September 16, 2004 (Gdynia Polish Film Festival); September 24, 2004 (Poland)
- Running time: 97 minutes
- Country: Poland
- Language: Polish
- Box office: $ 213,505

My Nikifor (Polish: Mój Nikifor) is a 2004 Polish drama film directed by Krzysztof Krauze. It is based on the life of Nikifor, a folk and naïve painter.

== Cast ==
- Krystyna Feldman as Nikifor
- Roman Gancarczyk as Marian Włosiński
- Lucyna Malec as Hanna Włosińska
- Jerzy Gudejko as Ryszard Nowak
- Artur Steranko as Doctor Rosen
- Jowita Miondlikowska as Cleaning Lady Kowalska
- Marian Dziędziel as Budnik

== Reception ==
Basing on 8 critics, My Nikifor holds an 88% rank on review aggregator website Rotten Tomatoes, with an average rating of 6/10.

Wally Hammond of Time Out gave the film 3 out of 5 and called acting as "solid".

In a review for Variety, Leslie Felperin wrote: "Though in most respects a conventional painter's biopic, My Nikifor has some interesting warps in its canvas".

According to Thomas Dawson of BBC, the film "is a spare yet affecting cinematic portrait".

== Awards ==
- 2005 Crystal Globe at the 40th Karlovy Vary International Film Festival, where also Krauze won the Best Director Award for the film.
- 2005 Polish Film Awards for best actress, best cinematography, best sound, best editing and best production design
- 2005 Chicago International Film Festival (Gold Hugo)
- 2005 Polish Film Festival in America (Golden Teeth Award)

== Bibliography ==
- Brooks, Xan (14 September 2007). "My Nikifor". The Guardian.
- "My Nikifor Review". Total Film. GamesRadar+. 14 September 2007.
