= Saviour Square (film) =

2006 film written and directed by Krzysztof Krauze and Joanna Kos-Krauze

- Polish: Plac Zbawiciela
- Directed by: Krzysztof Krauze, Joanna Kos-Krauze
- Written by: Krzysztof Krauze, Joanna Kos-Krauze
- Starring: Jowita Budnik, Arkadiusz Janiczek
- Cinematography: Wojciech Staroń
- Edited by: Krzysztof Szpetmański
- Music by: Paweł Szymański
- Release date: 2006

Saviour Square is a 2006 film written and directed by duo Krzysztof Krauze and Joanna Kos-Krauze. The film received Golden Lions at the Polish Film Festival.

== Cast ==
Source.

- Jowita Budnik as Beata
- Arkadiusz Janiczek as Bartek
- Ewa Wencel as Teresa
- Dawid Gudejko as Dawid
- Beata Fudalej as Edyta, neighbour of Teresa, friend of Beata
- Zina Kerste as Hania friend of Beata
- Zuzanna Lipiec as Irena, sister of Beata
- Krzysztof Bochenek as Wiktor
