= Ronald Bergan =

South African-born British writer and historian (1937–2020)

Ronald Bergan (né Ginsberg, 2 November 1937 – 23 July 2020) was a South African-born British writer and historian. He was contributor to The Guardian (from 1989) and lecturer on film and other subjects as well as the author (or co-author) of several books including biographies.

== Career ==
He was born Ronald Ginsberg in Johannesburg and educated there, in England, and in the United States. In France, he taught literature, theater, and film at the Sorbonne, the British Institute in Paris, and the University of Lille. He held a Chair at the Florida International University in Miami where he taught Film History and Theory. He lectured on film history at FAMU in Prague.

He was a writer for The Guardian and Radio Times, journalist, biographer, film historian, International Festival of Independent Cinema Off Camera (the head of the Jury), Film Festival Juror, founding president of FEDEORA (Federation of Film Critics of Europe and the Mediterranean) in May 2010 in Cannes, and film critic.

== Personal life ==
In 1960, Bergan married Maureen Myersohn, who later changed her name to Catriona. They lived primarily in London. They had a son, though they were impoverished at his birth and could not raise him, and so they arranged to have him adopted and raised by Myersohn's mother, who lived in Rhodesia, now Zimbabwe. The couple briefly separated in the early 1980s but reconciled. However, in the early 2000s, after Bergan's stint at Florida International University in the United States, they moved to Biarritz, France, and then Prague, Czechoslovakia.

In 2020, Bergan and his wife moved to Scotland. He died on 23 July 2020, aged 82, from urosepsis.

== Bibliography ==
- Bergan, Ronald, ed. (2008). François Truffaut : interviews. Jackson: University Press of Mississippi. ISBN 9781934110140.
- Jean Renoir: Projections of Paradise. Harry N. Abrams. 1 September 1994. ISBN 978-0-87951-537-9.
- Ronald Bergan. Robyn Karney. Bloomsbury Foreign Film Guide (London: Bloomsbury, 1988, 1991),

known, in the United States, as the Holt Foreign Film Guide, Henry Holt and Company, 1989
then The Faber Companion to Foreign Films. Faber & Faber. 1992. ISBN 978-0-571-12919-5.

- The Coen Brothers, Second Edition. Simon and Schuster. ISBN 978-1-62872-624-4.
- Sergei Eisenstein: A Life in Conflict. Skyhorse. ISBN 978-1-62872-626-8.
- The Film Book. Penguin. ISBN 978-0-7566-9188-2.
- The United Artists Story. Octopus. ISBN 978-0-7064-2581-9.
- The Life and Times of the Marx Brothers. Green Wood. ISBN 978-1-872532-08-0.
- The Life and Times of Laurel and Hardy. Green Wood. ISBN 978-1-872532-07-3.
- The Great Theatres of London: An Illustrated Companion. Chronicle Books. 1988. ISBN 978-0-87701-571-0.
- Francis Ford Coppola: Close Up: The Making of His Movies. Da Capo Press. 14 September 1998. ISBN 978-1-56025-194-1.
- Anthony Perkins: A Haunted Life. Little, Brown. 1995. ISBN 978-0-316-90697-5.
- Film Isms...: Understanding Cinema. Rizzoli. 15 March 2011. ISBN 978-0-7893-2214-2. "An IQON book; Isms Series;"
- The Eyewitness Guide To Film
- Lloyd, Ann; Hill, Rob; Bergan, Ronald; Darke, Chris; Frost-Sharratt, Cara Frost-Sharratt (2010). 501 must-see movies. San Diego, CA: Thunder Bay Press. ISBN 978-1607100881.
- Beyond the fringe ... and beyond : a critical biography of Alan Bennett, Peter Cook, Jonathan Miller and Dudley Moore. London: Virgin. 1989. ISBN 9781852271756.
