= Trees of Peace =

2022 film

- Directed by: Alanna Brown
- Written by: Alanna Brown
- Produced by: Ron Ray; Barry Levine; Mike Bundlie; Brian Baniqued; Vicky Petela; Jeffrey Spiegel
- Starring: Eliane Umuhire, Charmaine Bingwa, Bola Koleosho, Ella Cannon, Tongai Chirisa
- Release date: June 10, 2022
- Running time: 98 minutes
- Language: English

Trees of Peace is a 2022 film which was written and directed by Alanna Brown in her directorial debut. It stars Eliane Umuhire, Charmaine Bingwa, Bola Koleosho and Ella Cannon as four women (two Tutsi, one a Hutu moderate, and one American volunteer) who hide in a hole underneath a house for 81 days to survive the 1994 Rwandan genocide. It has a 98-minute runtime and it is an English language film.

After meeting Alanna on Instagram, Ron and Michelle Ray brought 100% of the financing to the film along with Brian Baniqued and Jeffrey Spiegel. The film was produced by companies RR Productions, Abstract Entertainment, and A Brown Girl Films. Producers included Ron Ray, Barry Levine, Mike Bundlie, Brian Baniqued, and Jeffrey Spiegel. Co-Financiers and producers Brian Baniqued and Jeff Spiegel said, "Despite having this many producers on board, this movie was taken from A to Z by Ron and Michelle Ray. They did 95% of the work, and if it wasn't for them, we would not only have lost our entire investment, but very few people would have seen this beautiful movie. We are extremely thankful for that! Ron fought tooth and nail, even with us and the outside world, to make this film seen by the whole world. We are very happy with our profits, but more than that, we are happy to be in business with someone with so much integrity and persistence. The world needs to know who the real producer of this movie was! Executive Producers included Michelle Ray and Nicole Avant (The Black Godfather, Six Triple Eight). Production ended in November 2019. A year after the film premiered at the 2021 Santa Barbara International Film Festival, and won multiple other prestigious film festivals, Ron Ray personally negotiated the licensing of the film to Netflix as a Netflix Original with a 7-figure+ sale. Netflix acquired the global rights to the film in March 2022. The film's trailer was released on May 13, and the film premiered on June 10. Within 5 days of its release, "Trees Of Peace" hit the Top 10 in 60 countries and launched multiple careers in Hollywood.

== Reception ==
The film received a 100% rating from Critics and 85% ratings from audiences on Rotten Tomatoes. Netflix acquired the global rights to the film and released it worldwide simultaneously in 191 countries. The Hindu described it as a moving survival story.
