= Bazigaga =

Historical genocide film by Jo Ingabire Moys

- Directed by: Jo Ingabire Moys
- Written by: Jo Ingabire Moys
- Screenplay by: Jo Ingabire Moys
- Produced by: Jo Ingabire Moys
- Starring: Ery Nzaramba; Roger Ineza; Aboudou Issam; Eliane Umuhire
- Production companies: White Boat Pictures; Full Dawa Production; Kibibi Productions
- Release date: March 4, 2022 (France)
- Running time: 25 minutes
- Country: France
- Language: Kinyarwanda

Bazigaga is a 2022 short French historical genocide film written and directed by Jo Ingabire Moys. Co-produced by Verbinski with Graham King and John B. Carls, the film stars Eliane Umuhire.

The film was a BAFTA Award for Best Short Film nominee in the 76th British Academy Film Awards.

== Summary ==
The film is based on true events, that tells the story of a young pastor "Karembe" (Ery Nzaramba) who must seek shelter with his daughter from the Hutu militia who would kill them both. To survive, they take refuge in the home of the eponymous and still feared local shaman (a powerfully engaging performance from Eliane Umuhire).

== Accolades ==
- 2022: BAFTA Awards: Nominated for Best Short Film
