= Jo Ingabire Moys =

Rwandan-British writer, actress and director

- Born: Moys; 1990 (age 35–36); Kigali
- Citizenship: Rwanda
- Education: Dulwich School
- Alma mater: Queen Mary University of London
- Occupation: Actress Writer Director
- Employer: BAFTA
- Known for: Acting
- Notable work: Bazigaga

Jo Ingabire Moys is a Rwandan-British writer, actress and director whose debut short film Bazigaga was nominated for a BAFTA after a successful festival tour.

== Early life and education ==
She was born in the early 1990s, at the beginning of the Rwandan Civil War that involved the genocide of the Tutsi people by the Hutu ethnic majority in 1994. She grew up in Kigali at the time when they were the only Tutsi family on the street. She is the youngest of six children. Her mother used to do business while her father worked for the customs office.

In 1997, when Moys was 8 years old, her school was attacked by militia forces of the former genocide regime who kidnaped the children of politicians. The following year, Moys and her family moved to Uganda for eight years and later to the United Kingdom. She attended Dulwich School in south London. This is where she found English literature and focused on books. She graduated from Queen Mary University of London.

== Career ==
She worked in various roles in film and TV before becoming a director. I am Leah, her debut play, is set to premiere at the Camden People's Theatre in the Autumn of 2024. She is the co-founder of the Ishami Foundation, a charity that fights discrimination against refugees and immigrants in African countries.
