= Wojciech Staroń =

Polish cinematographer (born 1973)

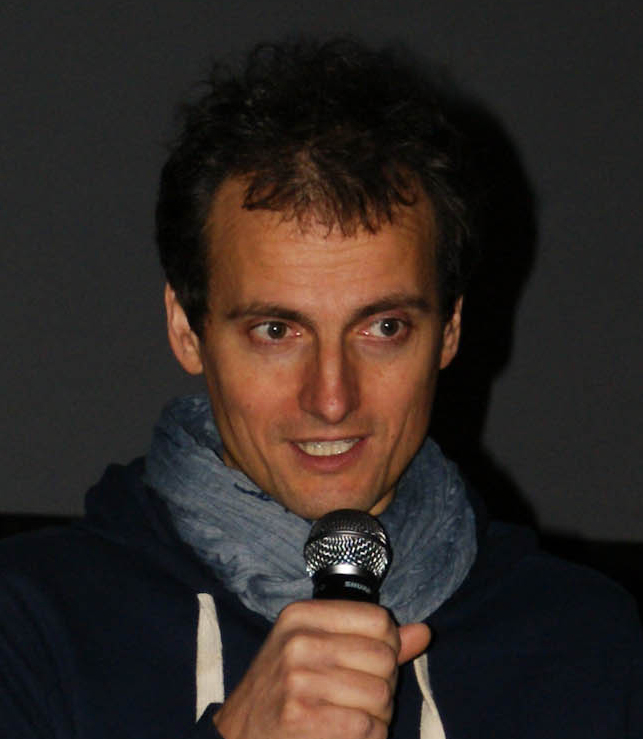
- Staroń in 2013
- Born: 9 December 1973; Ostrowiec Świętokrzyski
- Citizenship: Polish
- Occupations: Cinematographer, screenwriter, film director

Wojciech Staroń (born 9 December 1973) is a cinematographer, screenwriter and film director.

== Biography ==
In 1996 he graduated in cinematography from Łódź Film School. He became a member of the Polish Society of Cinematographers (PSC), the Polish Film Academy and the European Film Academy (EFA). In 2020, he obtained a habilitation degree in art, in the discipline of Film and Theatre Arts, awarded at the Łódź Film School.

== Filmography ==
=== Cinematography ===
- Plac Zbawiciela (2006)
- Before Twilight (2008)
- Vodka Factory (2010)
- Themerson & Themerson (2011)
- The Prize (2011)
- Uwikłani (2012)
- The Man Who Made Angels Fly (2013)
- Papusza (2013)
- Refugiado (2014)
- Świt (2015)
- A Sort of Family (2017)
- Dziura w głowie (2019)
- Sunburned (2019)
- Bitter Love (2020)
- Antyle Chopina (2020)
- Janvaris (2022)
- Głos (2022)
- El Suplente (2022)
- Pisklaki (2022)
- Autobiography (2022)
- The Substitute (2022)
- Danger Zone (2023)
- Wróbel (2024)
- El hombre que amaba los platos voladores (2024)
- Red Path (2024)

=== Director ===
- Syberyjska lekcja (documentary film, 1998)
- Argentyńska lekcja (documentary film, 2011)
- Bracia (documentary film, 2015)
- Pasja według Agnieszki (documentary film, 2025)

== Accolades ==
His debut documentary, Siberian Lesson (1998) won Silver Hobby-Horse and a Polish Canal+ Award at the Kraków Film Festival. It also got a Cinéma du Réel award, Audience Award at Århus Film Festival and a Special Mention at International Documentary Film Festival Amsterdam.

His other movie, Argentinian Lesson (2011), received Cinema Eye Honors Spotlight Award, Docu/Life Award at Docudays and Golden Horn, Best Film, Best Cinematography, Polish Society of Cinematographers and National Competition awards at the Kraków Film Festival.

In 2011, he received Silver Bear for Outstanding Artistic Contribution for The Prize. He was nominated for best cinematography at the 55th Ariel Awards for The Prize.

In 2014, together with Krzysztof Ptak he won Polish Film Award for best cinematography for Papusza.

His film Bracia (Brethren) won the Critics Week award at the 68th Locarno Film Festival in 2015, Golden Dove at the Dok Leipzig and a Grand Prix from Listapad in Minsk.

In 2020 he received Krzysztof Talczewski Award for "Outstanding Achievements in Documentary" at the 32nd "Man in Danger" Media Festival in Łódź. He won 2023 Malaysia Golden Global Award (MGGA) for best cinematography for Autobiography. Three times his work has been awarded prizes at the Camerimage.

In 2024 he received Bronze Gloria Artis Medal for Merit to Culture.
