= Krzysztof Ptak =

Polish cinematographer (1954–2016)

- Born: 3 April 1954; Sulejów
- Died: 19 August 2016 (aged 62)
- Citizenship: Polish
- Occupation: Cinematographer

Krzysztof Ptak (3 April 1954 – 19 August 2016) was a Polish cinematographer.

== Biography ==
Ptak was born in Sulejów in 1954. He graduated from the National Film School in Łódź in 1979 and began his film career by making documentaries. He co-operated with the National Film School of Denmark and was the rector of the UK National Film and Television School.

Ptak pioneered the HDTV in Poland with his 2003 film Pornografia and was one of the first Polish cinematographers to use digital cameras. He won Polish Film Award Eagle for best cinematography seven times, in 1999, 2002, 2004, 2005, 2007, 2010 and 2014 respectively.

He was the son of Józef and Alina Ptak and the brother-in-law of another Polish cinematographer, Przemysław Skwirczyński. Ptak and his wife, Malgorzata, had 3 children: Witold, Aneta, and Michal. He died at the age of 62 in Poland on 19 August 2016.

== Filmography ==
- Zabicie ciotki (1984)
- Przypadek Hermana Palacza (1986)
- Oferta (1987)
- Artysta (1987)
- Tabu (1987)
- Kostka cukru (1987)
- Widzę (1988)
- Kornblumenblau (1988)
- Pomiędzy wilki (1988)
- 300 mil do nieba (1989)
- Superwizja (1990)
- Le Retour (1990)
- Cynga (1991)
- Kowalikowie (1992)
- Motyw cienia (1993)
- Lepiej być piękną i bogatą (1993)
- Powidok (1993)
- Światło w mroku (1993)
- Litwo, słyszę Twój głos (1993)
- Jan Józef Lipski (1993)
- Dekalog - Polska 93 Dekalog - Polska 93 (1993)
- Artysta. Jerzy Kalina (1994)
- Podróż (1994)
- O przemyślności kobiety niewiernej. Sześć opowieści z Boccaccia wziętych (1994)
- Łagodna (1995)
- Panna Nikt (1996)
- Nocne graffiti (1996)
- Dzień wielkiej ryby (1996)
- Czas zdrady (1997)
- Historia kina w Popielawach (1998)
- Istota (2000)
- Weiser (2000)
- Przeprowadzki (2000)
- Edi (2002)
- Pornografia (2003)
- Mój Nikifor (2004)
- Jasminum (film) (2006)
- Nadzieja (2007)
- The Dark House (Dom zły, 2009)
- Afonia i pszczoły (2009)
- The Flying Machine (2011)
- Manipulation (2011)
- Skrzaty Fortepianu (short) (2011)
- Magic Piano (2011)
- Papusza (2013)
- Neighborhooders (Sąsiady, 2014)
- Birds Are Singing in Kigali (2017)

== Bibliography ==
- Taras, Katarzyna (2023). Zróbcie oko. Opowieść o Krzysztofie Ptaku. Mistrzowie Sztuki Operatorskiej. Łódź: Państwowa Wyższa Szkoła Filmowa, Telewizyjna i Teatralna im. Leona Schillera – Wydawnictwo Biblioteki Państwowej Wyższej Szkoły Filmowej, Telewizyjnej i Teatralnej. ISBN 978-83-65501-86-8.
