= Jowita Budnik =

Polish actress (born 1973)

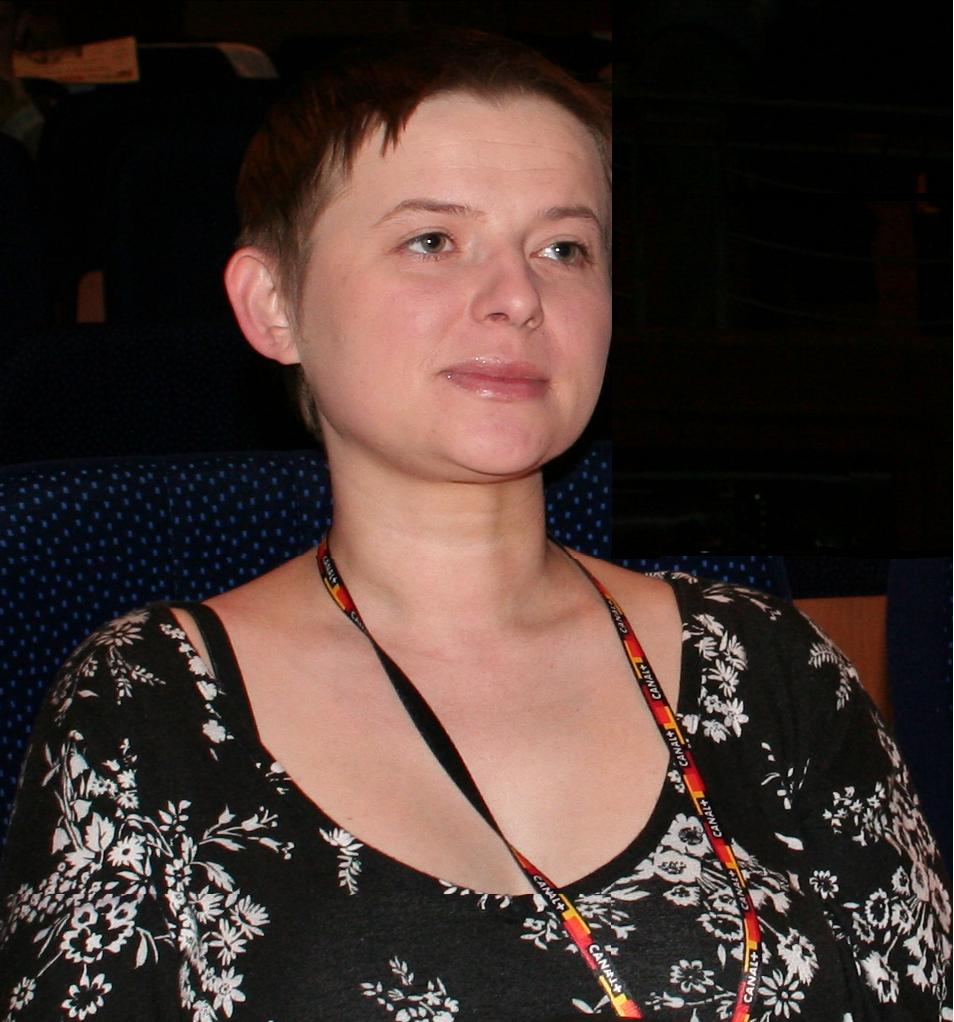
Jowita Budnik, 2006

Jowita Budnik (née Miondlikowska; born 28 November 1973) is a Polish actress.

== Biography ==
Budnik was born in Warsaw and studied at the University of Warsaw.

She made her film debut in 1985 at the age of 11 in Radosław Piwowarski's Kochankowie mojej mamy ("My Mom's Lovers"). She has appeared in such films as Papusza, Plac Zbawiciela and Jeziorak as well as the television series M jak miłość and W labiryncie. In 2017, she received Best Actress Award at the Chicago International Film Festival for her role in film Birds Are Singing in Kigali.

== Filmography ==
Source.

- Saviour Square (2006) as Beata
- Papusza (2013) as Papusza (Bronisława Wajs)
- Cicha noc (2017) as Basia, Adam's ount
- Birds Are Singing in Kigali (2017) as Anna Keller
- Icarus: The Legend of Mietek Kosz (2019) as Agata Kosz, mother of Mieczysław “Mietek”
