= Joanna Kos-Krauze =

Polish film director and screenwriter

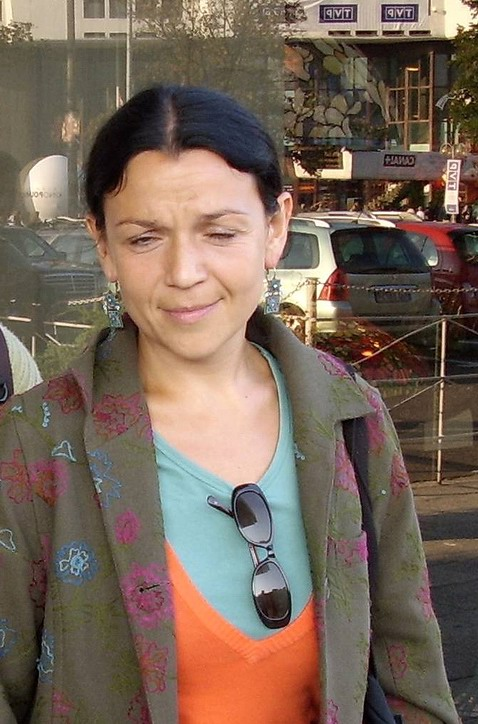
- Kos-Krauze in iran - 2019
- Born: 8 December 1972 (age 53); Olsztyn, Poland
- Occupations: Film director, screenwriter
- Spouse: Krzysztof Krauze

Joanna Kos-Krauze (born 8 December 1972), credited also as Joanna Kos, is a Polish film director and screenwriter, best known for her collaboration with her husband, Krzysztof Krauze (My Nikifor, Plac Zbawiciela /Saviour square).

In 2013 Joanna Kos and Krzysztof Krauze completed work on a biopic about the Romani poet, Papusza.

== Filmography ==
Writer

- 2004: My Nikifor
- 2006: Plac Zbawiciela
- 2013: Papusza
- 2017: Birds Are Singing in Kigali

== External links and sources ==
- Joanna Kos-Krauze at IMDb
- Joanna Kos-Krauze at the Culture.pl
