= Krzysztof Krauze =

Polish film director (1953–2014)

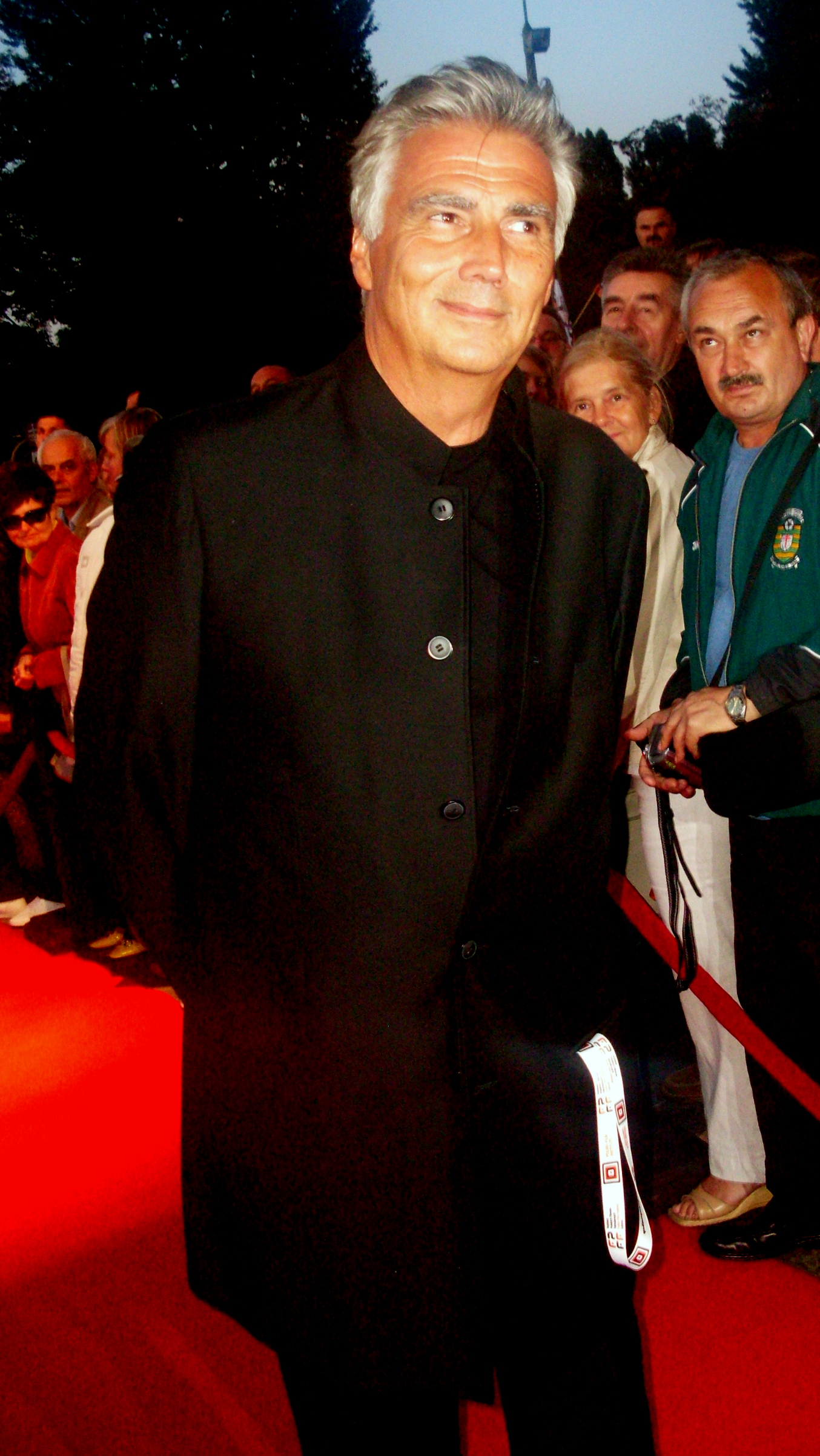
- Born: 2 April 1953; Warsaw, Poland
- Died: 24 December 2014 (aged 61); Warsaw, Poland
- Occupations: Film director, cinematographer, actor
- Spouse(s): Małgorzata Szurmiej (19??–19??; dissolved); Ewa Sałacka (1979–83; divorced); Joanna Kos-Krauze (1 March 2004 – 24 December 2014; his death)
- Children: 1

Krzysztof Krauze (2 April 1953 – 24 December 2014) was a Polish film director, cinematographer and actor, best known for his thriller The Debt (1999).

== Life and career ==
Krauze was born in Warsaw and completed his cinematography studies at the National Film School in Łódź in the 1970s. He left Poland in 1980, but returned in 1983. In the 1980s and early 1990s he worked for various production studios in Poland. In 1997 he was named "Man of the Year" by the Polish magazine Życie. He also acted in several films by other Polish directors.

== Death ==
Krauze was diagnosed with prostate cancer in 2006, and died on 24 December 2014, aged 61.

== Filmography ==
- 1976: Pierwsze kroki
- 1977: Symetrie
- 1978: Elementarz
- 1979: Dwa listy
- 1979: Deklinacja
- 1981: Praktyczne wskazówki dla zbieraczy motyli
- 1981: Dzień kobiet
- 1984: Jest
- 1984: Robactwo
- 1988: Nowy Jork, czwarta rano
- 1993: Nauka na całe życie
- 1994: Kontrwywiad
- 1994: Nauka trzech narodów
- 1994: Spadł, umarł, utonął
- 1994: Ogrody Tadeusza Reichsteina
- 1996: Departament IV
- 1996: Gry uliczne
- 1997: Fotoamator
- 1997: Stan zapalny
- 1999: Dług
- 2000: Wielkie rzeczy
- 2004: Mój Nikifor
- 2006: Plac Zbawiciela
- 2013: Papusza
