= Nurit Peled-Elhanan =

Israeli philologist

- נורית פלד-אלחנן
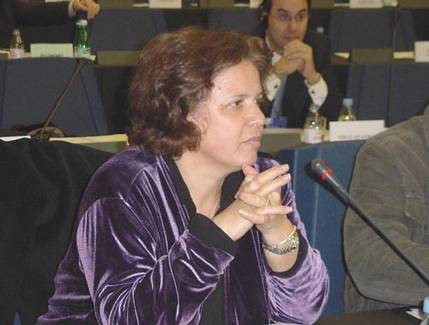
- Peled-Elhanan in 2001
- Born: Jerusalem
- Occupation: Philologist
- Employer: Hebrew University of Jerusalem
- Spouse: Rami Elhanan
- Relatives: Miko Peled (brother), Yigal Elhanan (son)
- Awards: Sakharov Prize (2001)

Nurit Peled-Elhanan (Hebrew: נורית פלד-אלחנן) is an Israeli philologist, professor of language and education at the Hebrew University of Jerusalem, translator, and activist. She is a 2001 co-laureate of the Sakharov Prize for Freedom of Thought awarded by the European Parliament. She is known for her research on the portrayal of Palestinians in Israeli textbooks, which she has criticized as being anti-Palestinian. Elhanan supports the Boycott, Divestment and Sanctions (BDS) movement.

== Biography ==
Nurit Peled-Elhanan was raised in a leftist family in Jerusalem's Rehavia neighborhood. She described her home growing up as a leftist-Zionist home. Her grandfather, Avraham Katsnelson, signed Israel's Declaration of Independence. She is the daughter of Matti Peled, an Israeli Major-General, scholar of Arabic literature, a member of Knesset and a noted peace activist.

Peled-Elhanan is married to graphic designer and peace activist Rami Elhanan, with whom she has four children. Their daughter, Smadar, was killed at the age of thirteen in the 1997 Ben Yehuda Street Palestinian suicide attack in Jerusalem. The story of Smadar from the point of her father is told in Colum McCann's 2020 novel Apeirogon.

Peled-Elhanan's brother, Miko Peled, is an activist for Palestinian rights, and author of the 2012 book, The General's Son: Journey of an Israeli in Palestine.

== Career ==
Peled-Elhanan has translated Albert Memmi's Le racisme (1982) and Marguerite Duras' Écrire (1993) into Hebrew.

Her book, Palestine in Israeli School Books: Ideology and Propaganda in Education, was released in the U.K. in April 2012.

In the 2010s she was a professor of language and education at the Hebrew University of Jerusalem and at the David Yellin College of Education. The latter suspended her in 2023.

== Recognition ==
She is a 2001 co-laureate of the European Parliament's Sakharov Prize for Freedom of Thought.

In 2007 she received the Paul K. Feyerabend Award.

== Opinions ==
=== On Israeli curriculum ===
In her book, Palestine in Israeli School Books: Ideology and Propaganda in Education, which was released in the UK in April 2012, Nurit Peled-Elhanan describes the depiction of Arabs in Israeli schoolbooks as racist. She states that their only representation is as "refugees, primitive farmers and terrorists," claiming that in "hundreds and hundreds" of books, not one photograph depicted an Arab as a "normal person."

In an August 2020 webinar hosted by her brother, Miko Peled, Peled-Elhanan said that the Israeli textbooks teach students that Israel exists primarily to prevent another Holocaust, and as such, Jews are the only ones ever presented as victimized. She stated further that the curriculum commands students to actively ignore other victims, and that it “Nazif[ies] Arabs.”

=== On the curriculum in Arab schools in Israel ===
As a lecturer in language and education, Peled-Elhanan has written and lectured widely on curricula and textbooks. She claims that the state-approved curriculum in Arab schools in Israel is highly censored, and that "the teaching of Palestinian history, or the Nakba, even in Arab schools (Nasser and Nasser, 2008), is forbidden -- a prohibition that has recently been formulated as a law (the Nakba Law). . . ." Peled-Elhanan also asserted that entire pages of textbooks are left blank as a result of this censorship, and “even if they wanted to [teach about Nakba, they can’t because] they are censored."

In 2020, Peled-Elhanan stated that teachers can plan to teach their Palestinian students whatever they want, but their textbooks do not allow it because their texts "are financed by [the] World Bank, the EU and so on and so forth who actually work for Israel."

=== On the Israeli-Palestinian conflict and Zionism ===
In a 2007 address, Peled-Elhanan referred to Israeli soldiers as the "murderers of children, destroyers of houses, uprooters of olive [orchards], and poisoners of wells who have been educated in this place over the years in the school of hatred and racism. [These] children who have learned for 18 years to fear and despise the stranger, to always fear the neighbours, the gentiles, children who were brought up in the fear of Islam – a fear that prepares them to be brutal soldiers and disciples of mass murderers"

In a 2013 interview for Ground Views about her study of Israeli textbooks, she said that Israelis were educated to “legitimate massacres” and glorify the military exploits of Sharon, Barak, and Rabin. In 2014, she wrote “Israeli leaders who worship nothing but Power and Death should know that no words will ever wash this blood off their hands, that nothing will ever exonerate them.”

In the same 2007 address to the Women in Black movement, she said of Israeli mothers:

“[They] are nothing but golems that have turned on their creators and are more terrible and cruel than they, who dedicate their wombs to the apartheid state and the occupation army, who educate their children in unmitigated racism and are prepared to sacrifice the fruits of their bellies on the altar of their leaders’ megalomania, greed and bloodthirstiness. These mothers are also to be found among the teachers and the educators of our day.”

Peled-Elhanan criticised Israeli writer A. B. Yehoshua for comments he made in reference to the cultural gap between Jews and Arabs that Yehoshua said was the reason they could never live together. She said that in her eyes Ehud Olmert, Ehud Barak, Ismail Haniyeh, and Hezbollah are equivalent: "They enjoy watching children die." When asked about an incident in which residents of a neighborhood in East Jerusalem had a barbecue near a Jewish neighborhood during Yom Kippur, shouted through megaphones and attacked Jews returning from synagogue, Elhanan said that the occupation and lack of neighborhood services generated hate and "hate creates things like that."

=== On the USA and the United Kingdom ===
Peled-Elhanan has stated, "The ones that are hurt are never the ones that deserve it. Was George Bush killed in the Twin Towers disaster? No. He ought to have been killed."

In 2007 she implied that Bush, Tony Blair and Ariel Sharon were destroying the world and accused the United States and the United Kingdom of "infecting their respective citizens with blind fear of the Muslims, who are depicted as vile, primitive and bloodthirsty, apart from their being non-democratic, chauvinistic and mass producers of future terrorists."

=== BDS ===
Peled-Elhanan supports the Boycott, Divestment, and Sanctions movement against Israel and has said “what Daesh (ISIL) is to Islam, Zionist Israel is to Judaism.”
