= Mattityahu Peled =

Israeli politician, general, and peace activist

- מתתיהו "מתי" פלד
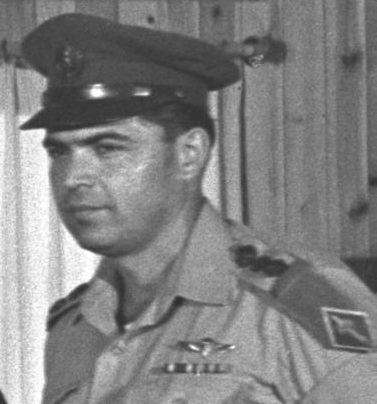

Faction represented in the Knesset
- 1984–1988: Progressive List for Peace

Personal details
- Born: 20 July 1923 Haifa, Mandatory Palestine
- Died: 10 March 1995 (aged 71) Israel
- Spouse: Ze'evah (Zika) (m. 1946)
- Children: 4 (including Yoav, Nurit, and Miko)
- Relatives: Avraham Katznelson (father-in-law); Rami Elhanan (son-in-law)

Military service
- Allegiance: Israel
- Branch/service: Haganah; Israel Defense Forces
- Years of service: 1941-1970
- Rank: Major General
- Commands: Givati Brigade, Military Commander of Jerusalem, Commander of Occupied Gaza in 1956, Quartermaster General in the 1960s
- Battles/wars: 1948 Palestine war Suez Crisis; Six-Day War; War of Attrition

Mattityahu "Matti" Peled (Hebrew: מתתיהו "מתי" פלד; born Mattityahu Ifland, 20 July 1923 – 10 March 1995) was an Israeli military officer, academic, and politician. He held the rank of Aluf (Major General) in the Israel Defense Forces (IDF) and served on the General Staff during the Six-Day War in 1967.

Following the war, Peled advocated for negotiations with the Palestine Liberation Organization and supported a complete withdrawal from the territories occupied during and after the conflict. These positions were considered controversial within Israeli political discourse at the time.

Peled retired from the IDF in 1969 and pursued academic studies, obtaining a Ph.D. in Arabic literature from the University of California, Los Angeles. He subsequently joined the faculty at Tel Aviv University, where he taught until 1990 and served as head of the Department of Arabic Language and Literature. Concurrently, he became involved in political and peace-related advocacy. He was a founding member of the Israel Council for Israeli-Palestinian Peace and participated in meetings with representatives of the PLO during a period when such contacts were subject to legal restrictions.

In 1984, Peled was elected to the Knesset as a member of the Progressive List for Peace and served until 1988. He later took part in the formation of Gush Shalom and expressed support for Israeli soldiers who refused to serve in the occupied territories.

Peled initially supported the Oslo Accords but later voiced criticism regarding their implementation. He remained active in public and political life until his death in 1995.

== Early years ==
Peled was born in 1923 in Haifa, then part of Mandatory Palestine, and grew up in Jerusalem. He attended the Hebrew University Secondary School. During his youth, he participated in a Labor Zionist youth movement. In 1938, he joined the Haganah, the main Jewish paramilitary organization in Mandatory Palestine, and in 1941 joined its new elite strike force, the Palmach. Following World War II, it became involved in activities opposing continued British rule. Peled served in the Palmach's Jerusalem Platoon alongside Yitzhak Rabin, with whom he maintained a long-term association.

== Arab–Israeli War and aftermath ==
In 1946, Peled began studying law in London. He returned to Palestine to fight in the 1947–1948 civil war. With the start of the 1948 Arab–Israeli War in May, he joined the newly established Israel Defense Forces (IDF), formed by consolidating various pre-state militias into a regular military force. During this period, Peled and many of his contemporaries, despite being in their twenties, assumed roles of significant responsibility within the IDF.

Following the 1949 Armistice Agreements, Peled served as the military commander of the Jerusalem region. During his tenure, he took part in a project involving the return of a small number of Palestinian refugees displaced during the Nakba. These individuals were permitted to cross the Green Line from the Jordanian-controlled West Bank into Israel. This instance represented a departure from the broader Israeli policy of opposing the right of return for Palestinian refugees. However, the returning refugees were not allowed to resettle in their original village of Ein Neqova, west of Jerusalem, but were instead relocated to the nearby village of Ein Rafa.

Peled was identified early in his military career as a candidate for senior staff roles and was sent in the early 1950s to study at the British Staff and Command College, along with Yitzhak Rabin and others who later rose to senior positions within the IDF. While in the United Kingdom, Peled met several Jordanian officers who were also enrolled in the course; some of these individuals would later attain senior ranks in the Jordanian military.

== Military commander of Gaza ==
Peled served as the military commander of the Gaza Strip during the 1956–1957 Israeli occupation, which followed the Suez Crisis. Although the occupation was brief, it marked a significant point in his personal and professional development. He later described the experience of governing a large Palestinian population without knowledge of Arabic or a detailed understanding of Palestinian culture or daily life.

This period influenced Peled’s decision to study Arabic and contributed to his broader view that mutual understanding between Jewish and Palestinian communities, particularly through language, was important for coexistence within a shared geographical space. At the time, these views were not yet tied to a specific political framework; it was only later that he developed the political positions that would define his subsequent public life.

== The "Generals' Protest" and the Six-Day War ==
During the political crisis preceding the Six-Day War in May 1967, Peled, then holding the rank of Aluf (Major General) and serving as head of the IDF Supply Division, was regarded as a war hawk. As Egyptian forces massed in the Sinai Peninsula and the Israeli government under Prime Minister Levi Eshkol debated its response, Peled was among a group of senior officers urging immediate attack. Alongside Major Generals Ariel Sharon and Israel Tal, he took part in what later became known as the "Generals' Protest," reportedly threatening to resign if the government did not start a preemptive war. This protest remained largely unknown to the public for many years.

Historians have offered differing interpretations of the protest's significance. Some argue it played a critical role in pressuring the government to initiate the war, while others contend that the decision had already been made and that the government's apparent delay was intended to secure international, particularly American, backing.

In subsequent years, Peled stated that his stance in 1967 was based on strategic and economic considerations. As head of the Supply Division, he was concerned that prolonged mobilization of IDF reserves—who made up a large portion of Israel's labor force—would further damage an already weakened economy. He argued that a rapid and decisive military strike was necessary to minimize economic disruption by enabling a swift demobilization of the reserves. According to Peled, his support for the war was limited to its military aims, and he did not foresee the long-term occupation of territories captured during the conflict or the establishment of settlements intended to permanently integrate those areas into Israel. He later opposed these policies.

Peled retired from military service in 1969. In that period, he visited Vietnam as an official guest of the United States Army and was welcomed by American military officials. At the time, he supported U.S. involvement in the Vietnam War, a position he would later revise.

== Scholar and commentator ==
Following his military service, Peled—who had studied Arabic literature during his time in the IDF—completed and submitted a Ph.D. dissertation at the University of California, Los Angeles, focusing on the works of Egyptian author Naguib Mahfouz. Peled went on to become one of the founding members of the Arabic Literature Department at Tel Aviv University, which he led for several years. He became recognized as a serious and innovative scholar in the field of Arabic literary studies.

Concurrently, Peled began publishing articles in the weekend edition of Maariv, through which a marked shift in his political views toward the left became evident. He joined the Israeli Labor Party and, during the 1973 Israeli legislative election, was part of a group of public figures with dovish views who urged voters to support Labor over more left-wing parties.

In subsequent years, Peled reversed this stance, becoming a prominent figure in several left-wing political movements and frequently voicing criticism of the Labor Party. Despite such criticisms and the skepticism of his political opponents, Peled consistently identified as a Zionist throughout his life.

== Peace activist ==
In 1975 Peled was one of the founders of the Israeli Council for Israeli-Palestinian Peace (ICIPP), alongside figures including Uri Avnery, Yaakov Arnon, Yossi Amitai, Amos Keinan, and Aryeh Eliav. While Avnery had been a longstanding critic of the Israeli establishment since the early 1950s, most of the ICIPP's founders—including Peled—were former members of the Israeli political and security establishment who had shifted toward more left-leaning positions in the early 1970s.

The charter of the ICIPP advocated for Israel's withdrawal from the territories occupied in 1967 and the establishment of an independent Palestinian state in those areas, with Jerusalem to be shared between the two parties. At the time, this position was considered highly controversial within Israeli political discourse. The ICIPP was the first Zionist organization to publicly endorse such a proposal. Peled, along with several other ICIPP members, later won a libel lawsuit against a columnist who had described them and their organization as anti-Zionist.

The ICIPP aimed to facilitate informal and unofficial dialogue between Israelis and Palestinians through a variety of channels. In addition, the organization sought to encourage the initiation of official negotiations between the Government of Israel and the leadership of the Palestine Liberation Organization (PLO).

As chief coordinator of the ICIPP, Peled played a central role in the initially clandestine meetings with representatives of the PLO. The first such meeting took place in Paris in 1976 and included Peled and several other Israelis in dialogue with senior PLO official Issam Sartawi, who participated with the full authorization of PLO Chairman Yasser Arafat. Arafat himself would not engage directly in such contacts until the Siege of Beirut during the 1982 Lebanon War. The initiation of this dialogue marked a notable shift in PLO policy, as the organization had previously maintained a position of engaging only with anti-Zionist Israelis.

The Israeli participants in these early contacts with the PLO received numerous death threats, and some newspaper columnists publicly accused them of treason. At the time, the PLO was widely regarded in Israel as a terrorist organization responsible for acts of violence, and the notion of engaging in dialogue with its representatives was viewed by much of the Israeli public as incomprehensible.

During his first term as Prime Minister of Israel (1974–1977), Yitzhak Rabin was approached by Peled, who offered to brief him on the unofficial contacts taking place between Israeli representatives and the PLO. Rabin agreed to receive these briefings, and on several occasions, Peled served as a channel through which PLO representatives—such as Sartawi—conveyed messages intended for the Prime Minister. While Rabin listened to the briefings, he declined to send any messages in return, stating, "That would be negotiating with the PLO, and I will never, never do that." In later years, Rabin would engage in official negotiations with the PLO, culminating in the Oslo Accords signed with Arafat. Peled regarded the Oslo process as, in part, the result of groundwork laid by early efforts in the 1970s to establish dialogue between Israelis and Palestinians.

== Left Camp of Israel ==
Peled's first formal involvement in party politics began in 1977 with the establishment of the Left Camp of Israel, a political party whose platform centered on advocating peace negotiations with the Palestinians. Peled, along with nearly all members of the ICIPP, joined the new party. Despite the ideological common ground shared by its members—who were positioned on the dovish end of the Israeli political spectrum—significant internal disagreements soon emerged regarding political strategy and tactics.

One faction, led by Ran Cohen, argued that Israelis engaging in dialogue with Palestinian representatives should seek reciprocal concessions, such as official recognition of the State of Israel. In contrast, Peled, who served on the party’s executive throughout its six-year existence but never held elected office, maintained that Palestinian leaders could not be expected to offer such concessions in informal talks with Israeli dissidents. He argued that doing so would undermine their negotiating position in any future official talks with the Israeli government—a prospect that seemed remote at the time, particularly after the 1977 elections brought Menachem Begin to power as Prime Minister and Ariel Sharon to the post of Minister of Defense.

Within the Left Camp of Israel, the ICIPP group—led by Peled and Uri Avnery—effectively became a faction in ongoing conflict with Cohen's group. Tensions peaked during the 1982 Lebanon War. Peled publicly supported the stance of reserve soldiers who refused to serve in the war, as organized by the Yesh Gvul movement. Around 200 of these refusers were imprisoned, and Peled’s endorsement attracted significant public attention due to his background as a senior military officer. Ran Cohen, himself a reserve colonel, objected strongly to this position, asserting that soldiers were obligated to carry out orders even if they personally disagreed with the war. Cohen participated in the conflict as an artillery officer during the bombardment of Beirut.

Meanwhile, Avnery crossed into West Beirut during the siege to meet with PLO Chairman Yasser Arafat—a first for any Israeli figure. Cohen condemned the meeting, describing it as "fawning." In response, Peled accused Cohen of being "a war criminal who bombards a civilian population". This precipitated a final split and break-up of the party. Cohen and his followers decisively parted ways with Peled and Avnery.

== Progressive List for Peace and Knesset service ==
In 1984, Peled and Avnery were among the founding members of the Progressive List for Peace, a joint Jewish-Arab political party. Their Palestinian-Israeli partners included Mohammed Miari and Reverend Riah Abu El-Assal.

Several efforts were made by the Israeli government and right-wing parties to disqualify the PLP from participating in elections. These efforts echoed earlier attempts to ban Palestinian-Israeli political activism, such as the outlawing of the Al-Ard movement in 1965. However, the Supreme Court of Israel rejected these attempts, allowing the party to stand in the 1984 elections.

In that election, both Miari and Peled were elected to the Knesset. Peled’s parliamentary term coincided with the outbreak of the First Intifada, but his legislative work extended beyond issues related to the Israeli-Palestinian conflict. He took an active interest in a wide range of topics and occasionally found common ground with members of right-wing parties on non-security-related matters.

Peled gained a reputation as a serious and diligent parliamentarian. His speeches in the Knesset were often likened to academic lectures, and he was known to spend considerable time preparing for them—reportedly reading for an entire week in preparation for a ten-minute address on a specialized subject. He consistently declined to use media-friendly tactics or include soundbites in his statements, a stance that frustrated the party's public relations staff. Peled lost his Knesset seat in the 1988 elections when the PLP was reduced to a single seat.

== Final years ==
In his final years, Peled focused on promoting dialogue based on mutual recognition and respect between Israelis and Palestinians, alongside continued academic work in Arabic literature. He was the first Israeli professor of Arabic literature to incorporate the study of Palestinian literature into the university curriculum.

Peled authored numerous political articles published in both Israeli and international media and translated several works of Arabic literature into Hebrew. His final translation, The Sages of Darkness by Salim Barakat, was recognized with the Translators' Association Prize.

In 1993, Peled was involved in founding Gush Shalom. Within the movement, he alternated between sharp criticism of then-Prime Minister Yitzhak Rabin for human rights violations in the occupied territories, public praise for Rabin’s engagement with the Palestine Liberation Organization and the symbolic handshake with Yasser Arafat on the White House lawn, and increasing concern over the slow pace of the peace process, ongoing occupation, and settlement expansion.

In 1994, Peled was diagnosed with terminal liver cancer. Despite his illness, he continued to follow political developments and wrote political essays, even when doing so became physically difficult. His final essay, titled Requiem to Oslo, was published in The Other Israel, the newsletter of the Israeli Council for Israeli-Palestinian Peace. In it, he expressed disappointment with the Oslo Accords and predicted renewed conflict, later realized in the outbreak of the Second Intifada in 2000. Peled died on March 10, 1995.

Peled's funeral was attended by a diverse group that included both peace activists and former military colleagues. Messages of condolence were delivered from the Government of Israel as well as from Yasser Arafat. Following his death, Peled's widow, Zika Peled, donated his personal library to the Arab Teachers' College at Beit Berl, and his political writings were archived at the Lavon Institute.

== Personal life ==
Peled was married and had two sons and two daughters.

One daughter, Nurit Peled-Elhanan, is a professor of language and education at the Hebrew University of Jerusalem. Her 14-year-old daughter Smadar Elhanan was murdered in the 1997 Ben Yehuda Street suicide bombing, in the center of Jerusalem. Her family, including a short biography of Peled, is mentioned in Colum McCann's 2020 novel Apeirogon.

One son, Miko Peled, is also a peace activist and lives in San Diego.

== See also ==
- List of peace activists
