= Twist (McCann novel) =

2025 novel by Colum McCann

- 1st edition United States cover
- Author: Colum McCann
- Language: English
- Genre: Literary fiction
- Published: 2025 (Random House)
- Publication date: March 25, 2025
- Pages: 256 (Hardcover, 1st edition)
- ISBN: 9780593241738

Twist is a 2025 literary fiction novel by Irish author Colum McCann. It was released on March 25, 2025.

== Plot ==
Irish journalist Anthony Fennell joins the crew of a cable laying ship to write an article on submarine communications cables. Over the course of his journey, Fennell makes connections with the ship's crew and reckons with his own personal trauma.

== Development history ==
As part of the research process for the book, McCann traveled with a French cable laying ship to better understand the process and the ship's layout.

=== Publication history ===
Twist was published in the United States by Random House on March 25, 2025. It was released published in the United Kingdom by Bloomsbury.

== Reception ==
The Irish Times was positive, offering praise for the book's story and prose. The Guardian wrote that McCann's prose contained vivid descriptions of the physical activity of the book's world but that it occasionally veered towards pretentiousness. Ron Charles echoed that concern in a more critical review published by The Washington Post, in which he wrote that despite some "genuinely gorgeous passages," the novel was "difficult to read" due to its dense prose. The Boston Globe, by contrast, praised McCann for drawing allusions to works by James Joyce, Don Delillo, and Samuel Taylor Coleridge.

Kirkus Reviews published a starred review, describing the novel as "astounding" and praising McCann's prose, comparing it to his earlier novel Let the Great World Spin. Booklist was similarly positive, positively describing McCann's description of global characters. Esquire noted that the book's story carried good suspense, a sentiment echoed in a positive review in New Statesman.
