= Joe Hurley =

British singer-songwriter

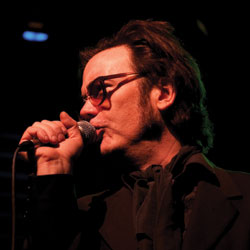
- Joe Hurley

Background information
- Origin: New York, United States
- Genres: Traditional Irish folk, rock and roll, punk
- Years active: 1999–present
- Labels: Arabon, Hurley Records
- Members: Joe Hurley; Kenny Margolis; James Mastro; Tony Shanahan

Joe Hurley (born 2 December) is a singer, songwriter, actor, playwright and voice-over artist. He leads the bands Joe Hurley & The Gents and Joe Hurley & Rogue's March. He is the founder and curator of the Allstar Irish Rock Revue, a musical-literary homage to "The Great Irish Songbook", celebrated annually around St. Patrick's Day.

Raised Irish Catholic in London, Hurley now lives in New York City. His roots in three distinct heritages inspired his eclectic songwriting, which has been described as a blend of punk, rock and roll balladry, and traditional Irish folk Musically, Hurley is noted for his soulful ("whiskey-tinged") baritone and the storytelling quality of his lyrics.

His ballad "Amsterdam Mistress" is featured on the Sony Records' compilation Whiskey in the Jar: Essential Irish Drinking Songs and Sing Alongs, along with classics from The Dubliners, Pogues, and Clancys. In 2011, Hurley was listed in the Guinness Book of World Records as one of seventy-five authors who participated in the UN's International Day of Peace.

== Recent work ==
=== The House That Horse Built (Let The Great World Spin) ===
2010 was marked by Hurley's collaborations with two best-selling books. Hurley and author Colum McCann co-wrote a song-cycle – "The House That Horse Built (Let the Great World Spin) "—based on McCann's 2009 National Book Award-winning novel, Let the Great World Spin. The album is written from the perspective of Tillie, a 38-year-old black prostitute from the Bronx, who is reflecting on her tragic life.

The album was recorded with Hurley's band The Gents and features such musicians as The Chieftains' Paddy Moloney, Matt Sweeney, Tami Lynn, film actress Antonique Smith, Denis Diken, Joe McGinty, and Faith Hahn. It was produced by Don Fleming and Hurley.

=== Life by Keith Richards ===
Also in 2010, Hurley, Johnny Depp, and Keith Richards narrated the audiobook version of Keith Richards' memoir, Life. Life won two 2011 Audie Awards – Audiobook of the Year and Best Biography/Memoir. Additionally, the audiobook was voted Amazon's No. 1 Audiobook of the Year for 2010.

== Bands and musical projects ==
=== Joe Hurley and The Gents ===
Joe Hurley currently fronts the band Joe Hurley and The Gents. The Gents are James Mastro (Ian Hunter), Tony Shanahan (Patti Smith), and Ken Margolis (Cracker), Denny McDermott, Megan Gould, and Jon Spurney.

=== Joe Hurley and Rogue's March ===
Joe Hurley fronted the New York-based, Irish-tinged rock and roll band Rogue's March from 1995 to 2004. They released two critically acclaimed CDs, Never Fear and Chaser. Their debut album, Never Fear (2000), includes the hits, "Shut Up and Drink", and the Christmas heartbreaker, "Amsterdam Mistress." The New York Post called the song "Shut Up and Drink" "a New York Irish Anthem":

"The Rogue's March pub hit was the theme song of defunct dive bar The Village Idiot, and is on the playlist of every respectable watering hole in town. (The tune has also been covered in Germany, Denmark, Canada, and Ireland)".

The ballad "Amsterdam Mistress" is included on the seminal Irish folk-rock collection, Whiskey in The Jar: Essential Irish Drinking Songs and Sing Alongs, released by Sony.

Their sophomore effort, Chaser (2003), was produced by James Mastro. Hurley's tune, "Madcap Tears" from the Chaser CD has been featured in Captain Morgan's rum TV ads.

The original Rogue's March line-up was Gary Johannes, Bill Gerstel, Jim Harry, Dan Prater, Ken Margolis and Hurley. J-F Vergel and Chris Nappi joined in 1996. Other members were Ivan Julian, Adam Roth, Jason Goodrow, and Andrew Goodsight.

=== Allstar Irish Rock Revue ===
The Allstar Irish Rock Revue is an annual musical-literary collaboration founded and curated by Hurley. The Revue takes place in New York City in celebration of St. Patrick's Day and is a famed New York City event. The Revue has been called, "The most celebrated musical event of the St. Patrick's season in New York" and '"[It] draws rave reviews every year as the biggest St. Patrick's party in town". National Geographic Traveler rated the Revue "the No. 2 Star Attraction" in the article "The Best 10 Places to Spend St. Patrick's Season in America".

Hurley, Irish-blooded himself, began the review as a way to honour "The Great Irish Songbook" by playing Celtic classics alongside the tunes of Thin Lizzy, Morrissey, The Pogues, The Dubliners, U2, John Lydon, and Van Morrison, to name a few. Every year, the Revue features different artists from all walks of life. In 2011, the Revue celebrated its 12th anniversary with a sold-out show at the Highline Ballroom. The performance featured the Alice Cooper Group, Gene Cornish, Oscar winner Sam Bisbee, Tony-winning actor Michael Cerveris, SNL's Christine Ohlman, Joe Piscopo, Noel Kilkenny (the Irish ambassador to the USA), and NYC guitar greats Adam Roth (Denis Leary) and Ricky Byrd, who played Gary Moore's very own Les Paul, in a moving tribute weeks after the Thin Lizzy guitarist's passing.

Past musical guests have included Ronnie Spector, Fountains of Wayne, Martha Wainwright, Gogol Bordello, Garland Jeffreys, Nada Surf's Matthew Caws, Irish sensations The High Kings, The Crystals' LaLa Brooks, Carrie Rodriguez, Ellen Foley, Lenny Kaye, Faith Hahn, Tony Shanahan and Jay Dee Daugherty of Patti Smith Group, Oscar winner Mike Viola, film stars Annie Golden, Jesse Malin, Susan McKeown, Willie Nile, Kristeen Young, Ireland's chart-topping Republic of Loose, members of Irish supergroup Clanaad, the New York Dolls, The Dictators, The Mekons, Cracker, and Ian Hunter Band.

Gibson Guitars has sponsored the Revue since 2006. Gibson had a customised Irish-flag Epiphone made exclusively for Joe Hurley and the Irish Revue. It is the only one of its kind in the world. The guitar is played on the show-closing finale, "God Save The Queen" written by John Lydon (Sex Pistols). In 2007, Hurley decided to turn the Revue into a fundraising event for various charities. To date, proceeds from the Revue have gone to Save St Brigid's, The Animal Rescue League, Gilda's Club of NY, The Bowery Mission, the Widows of NYPD, and Haitian Relief.

When asked to describe The Allstar Irish Rock Revue, Hurley is quoted as saying, "The Songbook is of Ireland, but for everyone… New Yorkers from all backgrounds singing them. That's what the show is all about. There's no other songbook that translates so well across the world".

== Collaborations ==
Hurley is known for his collaborations with a wide range of musicians and authors. He has sung and/or recorded with Ian Hunter, playwright Sam Shepard, PJ Harvey, Marianne Faithfull, Judy Collins and Jimmy Webb, Shane Macgowan, John Oates, Prefab Sprout, Laura Cantrell, Tami Lynn, The Waco Brothers, Faith Hahn, Kristeen Young, Antonique Smith, Annie Golden, Amy Rigby, Michael Cerveris, Lala Brooks (The Crystals), Steve Wynn, The Nick Drake Orchestra, Indaculture and the Queens All-Stars, cabaret stars Andrea Marcovicci and Maude Maggart, Martha Wainwright, Sally Timms (The Mekons), Nellie McKay, and Christine Ohlman, among others.

His recordings have been produced by Tony Visconti, PJ Harvey, Jim Harry, James Mastro, and Don Fleming.

== Appearances ==
=== Festivals ===
Joe Hurley has headlined and performed at a variety of American and international musical and literary festivals. Noteworthy performances of recent years include:

- Festival America—headliner—Vincennes, France – September 2010
- International Literature Festival Berlin – -- musical artist-in-residence—Berlin, Germany—September 2010
- West Belfast Festival—headliner—Belfast, Northern Ireland—August 2010
- Irish Consulate in New York City—Joe Hurley performs The House That Horse Built (Let The Great World Spin) for Irish President Mary McAleese—New York—2009
- Public Theater Gala Concert Fundraiser—Joe Hurley with Jimmy Webb, Judy Collins, and Shawn Colvin—New York—2008
- ChicagoFest—Joe Hurley with The Waco Brothers and Justin Townes Earle—Chicago—2008
- Central Park Summerstage—Joe Hurley with Teddy Thompson and Josh Max, conducted by Robert Kirby—New York—2006
- "Gimme Shelter: Animal Rescue Benefit" at Hiro Ballroom—Joe Hurley & The Gents with Beastie Boys, Debbie Harry, Blue Öyster Cult, Nellie McKay, and Marshall Crenshaw—New York—2006
- Warped Tour—North American Tour—2001

=== Television ===
- French TV's "La Grande Librairie" with Salman Rushdie, Philip Roth, William Kennedy, and Colum McCann—September 2010

== Discography ==
=== Albums ===
- The House the Horse Built (Let The Great World Spin)—Joe Hurley and Colum McCann—2009 (Hurley Records)
- Live at the Loser's Lounge—Joe Hurley with The Loser's Lounge—2006 (Arabon)
- Chaser—Joe Hurley & Rogue's March—2003 (Arabon)
- Never Fear—Joe Hurley & Rogue's March—2000 (Arabon)

=== Singles ===
- "Bleeding Claret & Blue" – 2007 (Arabon)

Hurley's London upbringing led to a lifelong love affair with East London's West Ham United Football Club. The song, "Bleeding Claret & Blue"—West Ham's team colours—was written and recorded by Hurley for his team's appearance in the 2006 FA Cup Final and has been adopted by West Ham supporters' clubs worldwide as their theme song.

=== Compilations ===
- "Amsterdam Mistress" – Whiskey in the Jar: Essential Irish Drinking Songs & Sing Alongs—2006 (Sony Records)
