= Zeoli =

Zeoli is a surname. Notable people with the surname include:

- Billy Zeoli (1932–2015), American evangelical leader, speaker, and media executive
- Javier Zeoli (born 1962), Uruguayan footballer
- Jetsunma Ahkon Lhamo (born 1949), born Alyce Louise Zeoli

== See also ==
- Zoli
