= Tears of Blood (Ratwała jaswa) =

1952 narrative poem (song) and witness account by Papusza (Bronisława Wajs)

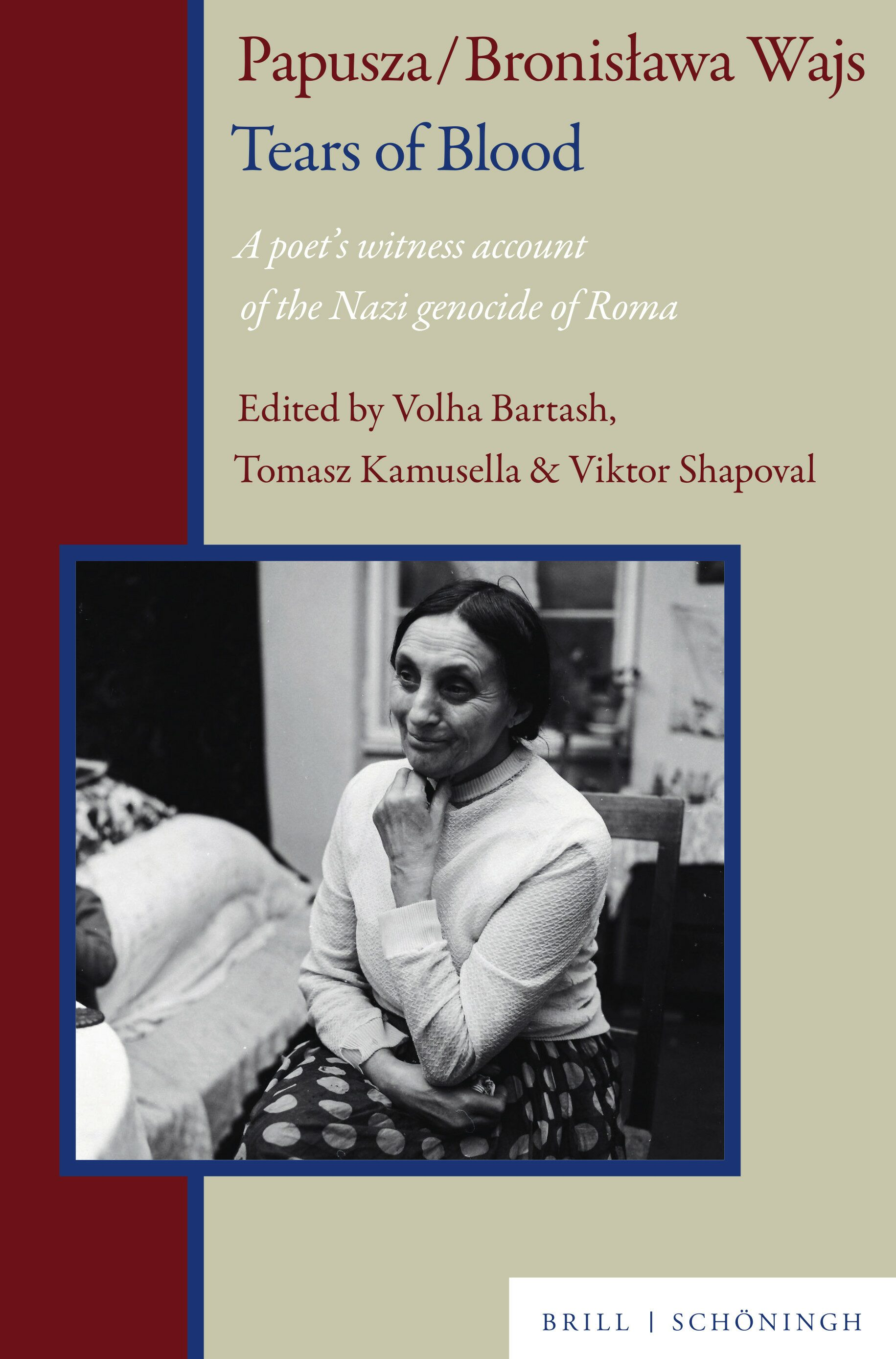
- First edition cover (Brill Schöningh, 2024)
- Editors: Volha Bartash, Tomasz Kamusella and Viktor Shapoval
- Author: Papusza
- Original title: Ratwałe jaswa
- Translators: Viktor Shapoval, Hamish Macdonald and Tomasz Kamusella
- Language: Romani
- Genre: Song; Narrative poem; Witness account; Kali Traš
- Set in: Volhynia and the vicinity (interwar Poland and during World War II under Soviet and German occupations, today in Ukraine and partly in Belarus)
- Publisher: Brill Schöningh
- Publication date: 2024
- Publication place: Paderborn, Germany
- English publication date: 2024
- Pages: 424
- ISBN: 9783506791313; Hardback; 9783657791316 e-book (Open Access)
- OCLC: 1505883520

Tears of Blood (Ratwała jaswa) is a song in the Homeric tradition, originally composed and performed orally for extended family Roma audiences at the close of and in the wake of World War II. Papusza wrote it down in 1952, as a witness account of the Kali Traš (Romani Holocaust), as experienced by her extended family in wartime Volhynia. The singer-cum-poet sought to reproduce all the particularities of the oral performance of the song in the resultant form of a narrative poem that counts 1,100 lines (verses).

== Publication history ==
In 1956, in communist Poland, Papusza's friend Jerzy Ficowski published a quarter of Tears of Blood, both in the Romani original and his Polish translation, in a volume with Papusza's 'Gypsy songs.' It was possible to publish the volume, thanks to the political liberalization (thaw) across the Soviet bloc, including Poland. Yet, despite this short-lived ideological relaxation, the events related in Tears of Blood were highly sensitive, requiring the cutting out of three-quarters of the text before the censors permitted the volume's publication.

Subsequently, Papusza's poems were published in such a censored form, exclusively in Polish with the omission of the Romani originals. The fall of communism in 1989 and the liquidation of censorship in democratic Poland did not change anything in this approach.

== Manuscript ==
Papusza's poetry is translated into other languages mainly from Ficowski's Polish translations-cum-adaptations or from the heavily censored Romani originals published in 1956.

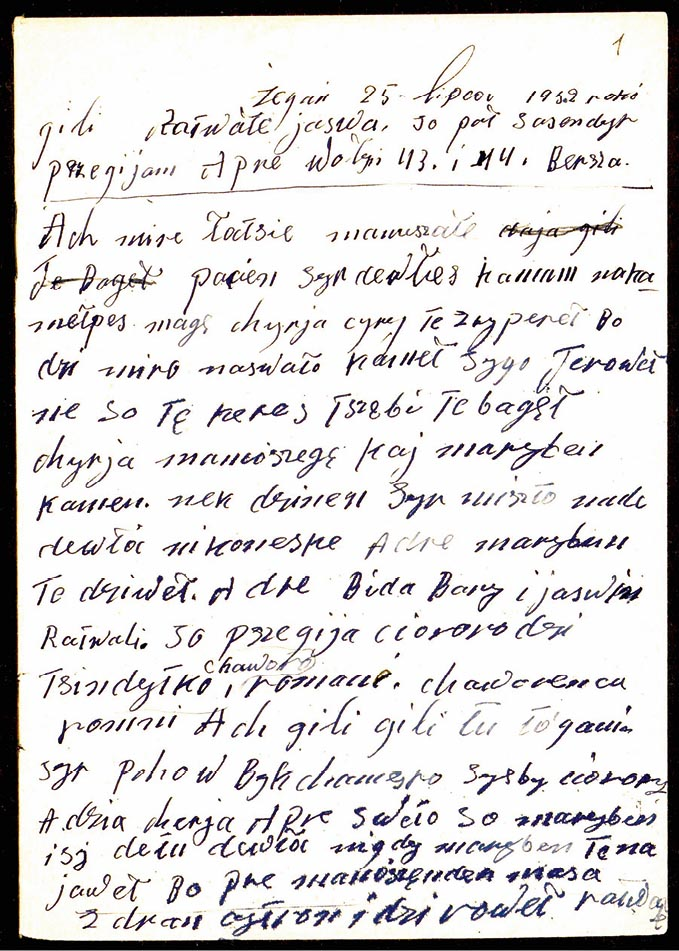
Initial page of Papusza's manuscript of Ratwała jaswa (Tears of Blood)

Given the importance of Papusza's oeuvre for Romani literature and her status as originator of this literature, scholars and Roma activists postulated the faithful transcription and publication of the poet's Romani-language manuscripts, including that of Tears of Blood. But until 2020 the location of Papusza's literary estate was unknown to interested scholars. Nowadays, Papusza's papers are archivized and made available to researchers in the Zbigniew Herbert Regional and Municipal Public Library (Wojewódzka i Miejska Biblioteka Publiczna im. Zbigniewa Herberta) in Gorzów Wielkopolski in north-western Poland.

== Translating Tears of Blood ==
In 2018, at the University of St Andrews, Tomasz Kamusella initiated a project of translating Tears of Blood into English and Scots from the bowdlerized Romani original published in 1956. Within the ERC project (Roma Interbellum: Roma Civic Emancipation Between The Two World Wars, 2016-2023), Elena Marushiakova and Veselin Popov supported his effort. From the literal English translation Scots poet Hamish MacDonald developed poetic translations of Tears of Blood into English and Scots, whereas Rody Gorman into Gaelic.

At this juncture, in 2021, Polish scholar Emilia Kledzik alerted Marushiakova that Papusza's literary estate had become available for researchers in the regional library in Gorzów Wielkopolski.

== Publishing Tears of Blood ==
The manuscript of Tears of Blood was found among Papusza's papers. It turned out to be four times longer than the fragment published in 1956. This fact necessitated to drop the previous project in favor of transcribing and translating the actual Roman original, as preserved in the manuscript. Roma history specialist Volha Bartash joined the team, alongside Viktor Shapoval, who specializes in Romani linguistics and culture.

Shapoval is the sole known scholar who is able to decode Papusza's idiosyncratic hand. The poet wrote the Romani original phonetically with the use of Polish spelling. The faithful transcription completed, Shapoval rendered it also in the so-called consensual Romani spelling. On this basis, he developed a Russian translation, which Kamusella literally translated into English. At both stages Marushiakova and Popov checked the Russian and literal English translations against the Romani original. Subsequently, Hamish MacDonald worked out an English poetic translation.

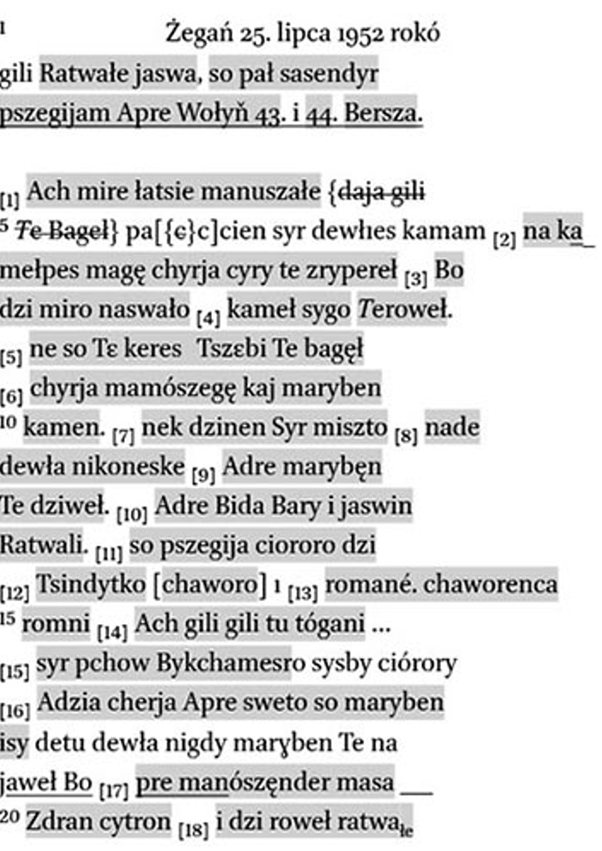
Transcription of the initial page of Papusza's Tears of Blood

At present there are no translators who would be able to render Papusza's Romani poetry directly into English. A team effort is indispensable for this purpose.

Volha Bartash oversaw the editorial work and also liaised with other scholars who contributed essay that reflect on the multifaceted context of Tears of Blood. Emilia Kledzik wrote on Papusza's biography, Sofiya Zahova on the place of Papusza's oeuvre in Romani literature, Viktor Shapoval on Papusza's language and literary devices employed, Mikhail Tyaglyy on the Romani genocide in Volhynia, while Bartash on the historic importance of Tears of Blood as a genocide survivor's testimony. In addition, kamusella reflected on the process of translation, while Marushiakova and Popov foreworded the book as volume 4 of their book series Roma History and Culture, whose goal is to write Roma history into the mainstream of European historiography.
