= Miko Peled =

Israeli American activist, author, and karate instructor

- מיקו פלד
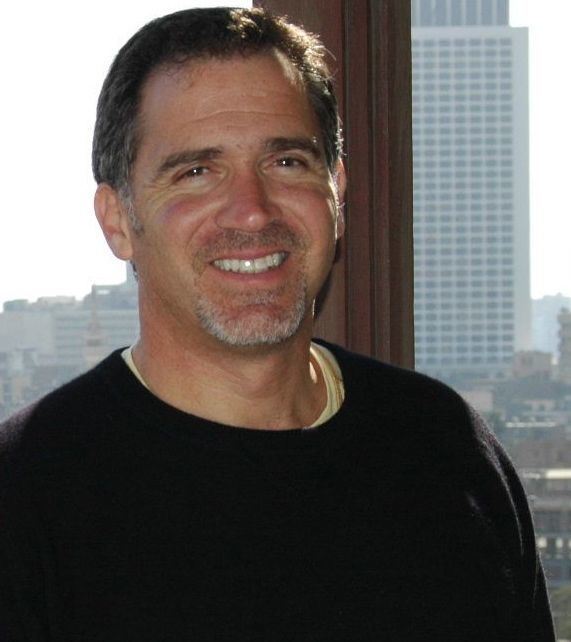
- Born: Avraham Peled; 10 December 1961 (age 64); Jerusalem
- Known for: author of The General's Son: the Journey of an Israeli in Palestine
- Spouse: Gila Peled
- Children: 5
- Family: Mattityahu Peled (father); Nurit Peled-Elhanan (sister); Yoav Peled (brother); Avraham Katznelson (grandfather); Rami Elhanan (brother-in-law)
- Website: mikopeled.com

Avraham "Miko" Peled (Hebrew: אברהם "מיקו" פלד; born 10 December 1961) is an Israeli-American activist, author, speaker, and karate instructor.

== Early life ==
Born in Jerusalem in 1961, Peled grew up in Motza Illit to a prominent Zionist family.

Peled's grandfather, Avraham Katznelson, after whom he was named, signed Israel's Declaration of Independence. Peled's father, Mattityahu Peled, who fought in the 1948 Arab–Israeli War and served as a general in the Six-Day War of 1967, became an advocate for an Israeli dialogue with the Palestine Liberation Organization (PLO) after the Israeli cabinet ignored his investigation of a 1967 alleged Israeli war crime. His brother is the political scientist Yoav Peled.

Miko Peled followed his father's footsteps at first, joining Israel's Special Forces after high school and earning the red beret, but he soon grew to regret his decision. He surrendered his status as soon as he earned it, becoming a medic, but finally, disgusted by the 1982 Lebanon war, buried his service pin in the dirt.

One evening in 1983, Peled skipped a Peace Now demonstration in Jerusalem to attend karate class, and on that evening a grenade attack by a right-wing extremist killed one of the demonstrators, Emil Grunzweig. "Peled took this as a sign," according to one interview, and consequently "followed the path of karate – a practice of non-violence...that teaches one to 'overcome insurmountable obstacles.'" This path "that took him to Japan and eventually to San Diego, where he settled with his wife and family". He then distanced himself from activism until 1997, becoming a sixth-degree black belt in karate.

In his book The General's Son: Journey of an Israeli in Palestine, Peled wrote that his father condemned the Israeli military for seizing the West Bank, Gaza, Sinai and the Golan Heights during the Six-Day War, and called the war a "cynical campaign of territorial expansion".

== Martial Arts America ==
Since 28 May 1989, Peled, a sixth-degree black belt, owned, operated, and taught at Martial Arts America, a school in Coronado, California, which "is dedicated to teaching leadership skills and non-violent conflict resolution through martial arts." In October 2012, he sold the business to his top student of over twenty years, David Michael Adams, in order to focus on promoting his book The General's Son.

== Activism ==
In 1997, Peled's 13-year-old niece Smadar, daughter of his sister Nurit Peled-Elhanan, was murdered in a Palestinian suicide terror attack in Jerusalem. At her funeral, according to an article summarizing Peled's book, Ehud Barak, who had just been elected to lead the opposition, explained that in order to gain appeal he must disguise his real intentions of becoming a "peacemaker." In reply, Peled said, "Why not tell the truth... That this and similar tragedies are taking place because we are occupying another nation and that in order to save lives the right thing to do is to end the occupation and negotiate a just peace with our Palestinian partners?"

The murder of Smadar, and his sister Nurit's insistence that it was caused by the occupation. "The activist side of me that I'd been suppressing," Peled has said, "suddenly burst out. It became stronger than anything." He joined a Palestinian/Jewish-American dialogue group in San Diego, where he "found that the Jewish Americans he met – with their 'New York humor and deli food' – were more foreign than the hummus, tabouleh and warm hospitality offered by his new Palestinian friends. He was shocked by random anti-Arab venom spewed casually by Jewish Americans he met who assumed he shared their views, in an atmosphere of growing Islamophobia." He also befriended Nader Elbanna, "a Palestinian from Nazareth who accompanied him on a dual lecture series at rotary clubs." Thus began a process whereby, in the words of Abulhawa, Peled "dismantled a lifetime of racist assumptions and replaced them with something more human and tender."

Returning to activism, Peled decided that the two-state solution his father had promoted would no longer suffice, and began to support for the creation of a single democratic state with equal rights for Israelis and Palestinians. Peled thinks that Israel is an apartheid state that must disappear and that a single-state solution is closer than many people think because of the changing mindsets of many Israelis, American Jews, and Holocaust survivors. He calls the Israeli government "a radical Zionist regime," and Israel a country where "half of the population lives in what it thinks is a Western democracy while keeping the other half imprisoned by a ruthless defense apparatus that is becoming more violent by the day." In 2018, he told the far right American Herald Tribune that "The State of Israel Will Crumble and We Will See A Free Democratic Palestine from the River to the Sea Sooner than Most People Think".

Peled has traveled in Palestine, has taught karate to children in refugee camps and has engaged in nonviolent activism. In his blog, he calls for the removal of the Israeli West Bank barrier, and the institution of equal rights for Israelis and Palestinians: "As an Israeli that was raised on the Zionist ideal of a Jewish state", he writes in the blog, "I know how hard it is for many Jews and Palestinians to let go of the dream of having a state that is exclusively 'our own.' The articles, the stories and the pictures in this blog are meant to make a single point: For the good of both nations, the Separation Wall must come down, the Israeli control over the lives of Palestinians must be defied so that a secular democracy where all Israelis and Palestinian live as equals be established in our shared homeland". Peled is a regular contributor to online publications the Electronic Intifada and the Palestine Chronicle.

In 2016, Peled generated controversy after tweeting that "Jews have reputation [for] being sleazy thieves," leading to the cancellation of his speaking engagements at Princeton and San Diego State University.

Peled spoke at a gathering at the British Labour Party conference in Brighton in September 2017. According to the Daily Mail, Peled said: "This is about free speech, the freedom to criticise and to discuss every issue, whether it's the Holocaust: yes or no, Palestine, the liberation, the whole spectrum. There should be no limits on the discussion ... It's about the limits of tolerance: we don't invite the Nazis and give them an hour to explain why they are right; we do not invite apartheid South Africa racists to explain why apartheid was good for the blacks; and in the same way we do not invite Zionists". Deputy Labour leader Tom Watson said the conference organizing committee would investigate why Peled was given a platform at the event.

At a talk titled Segregated and Unequal: Palestinian Life under Apartheid Israel, at University College London the following November, Peled said "The pro-Israel lobby uses all sorts of dirty tactics. For the last two years there has been this witch-hunt against antisemites and Holocaust deniers". He complimented the "clear leadership" of Labour's Jeremy Corbyn commenting that Corbyn had "put away this nonsense about Holocaust denial and this nonsense about antisemitism. You focus on what's important".

== Views ==
According to Peled: "Israel has been on a mission to destroy the Palestinian people for over six decades. Why would anyone not give solidarity to the Palestinian people?" He has said that Israel's actions in the Six-Day War of 1967 were not a response to a real threat but acts of bald aggression. And also that "every single Israeli city is a settlement" and that "expressing solidarity with Palestinians is the most important thing people can do."

On his Twitter feed, Peled has written that the "IDF lusts for blood," has called the peace process "a process of apartheid & colonization", and has accused Israeli officials of "ethnic cleansing." In his blog posts, he has repeatedly referred to the IDF as an "Israeli terrorist organization" that is part of a "well-oiled ethnic cleansing machine." He has also written that Israel's educational system is designed to turn Israeli children into racists who view Palestinians "as culturally inferior, violent and bent on the annihilation of the Jews, and...void of a true national identity," and "as a problem that must be solved and as a threat that must be eliminated." He has decried "absurd comparisons like that of Yasser Arafat to Hitler, the Palestinians to Nazis, and the Palestinian resistance to Al Qaeda."

Peled supports the Boycott, Divestment and Sanctions (BDS) movement against Israel. During a talk in Queensland, Australia, he supported a BDS campaign against the Israeli-owned Max Brenner chain of chocolate shops, part of the Strauss group of companies, which, he said, "supports a terrorist organisation, the Golani Brigade." BDS, he argued, was a "totally legitimate" means of "trying to stop this Israeli armed juggernaut."

Peled wrote in a June 2012 op-ed for the Los Angeles Times that,

Israel is faced with two options: Continue to exist as a Jewish state while controlling the Palestinians through military force and racist laws, or undertake a deep transformation into a real democracy where Israelis and Palestinians live as equals in a shared state, their shared homeland. For Israelis and Palestinians alike, the latter path promises a bright future.

During a speech at an Oxford Union debate on the proposition "This House Believes Israel is an Apartheid State Responsible for Genocide", Peled was noted as stating that "October 7 attacks was not terrorism. They were acts of heroism of a people that have been oppressed", drawing claims that he is "glorifying terrorism".

== Books ==
Peled has described his book, The General's Son: Journey of an Israeli in Palestine (2012), as an account of how he, "the son of an Israeli General and a staunch Zionist, came to realize that "the story upon which I was raised ... was a lie." The book, he has said, is based largely on long conversations with his mother, on a thorough reading of "everything my dad had ever written," and on material about his father's career in the Israeli army archives.

The book, which has been characterized as "part confessional, part cinematic epic and part emotional appeal for 'different answers' to the Israeli-Palestinian conundrum," contains a foreword by Alice Walker, author of The Color Purple.

In Peled's book, Injustice: The Story of the Holy Land Foundation Five (2018), he catalogs the trial of the criminalization and dismantling of the Holy Land Foundation for Relief and Development, leading to the arrest and jailing of Foundation President Shukri Abu Baker, Chairman Ghassan Elashi, Mohammad el-Mezain, Mufid Abdulqader and Abdulraham Odeh.

== Elbanna-Peled Foundation ==
Peled is, with Nader Elbanna, co-founder of the Elbanna-Peled Foundation. Established in 2010 and based in Coronado, California, it describes itself as being "committed to peace, justice and equality by operating exclusively for charitable and educational purposes, including, but not limited to the following:

1. Humanitarian aid to civilians who were injured as a result of Israeli Palestinian conflict.
2. Support existing educational efforts that promote Israeli Palestinian reconciliation.
3. Support local grassroots organizations that work together (Israelis and Palestinians) toward a non-violent resolution of the conflict."

The foundation describes itself as working closely with Rotary International. According to its website, "Peled and Elbanna sent 1000 wheelchairs for Palestinians and Israeli children, and have been part of numerous project to help the people of their shared homeland."

The foundation, however, was established under the National Taxonomy of Exempt Entities (NTEE) categories "Foreign Affairs" and "National Security." Its exempt status, moreover, was automatically revoked by the IRS because it failed to file a Form 990 ("Return of Organization Exempt from Income Tax") for three consecutive years.

== See also ==
- List of peace activists
