= Ya'akov Arnon =

Israeli economist and anti-war activist

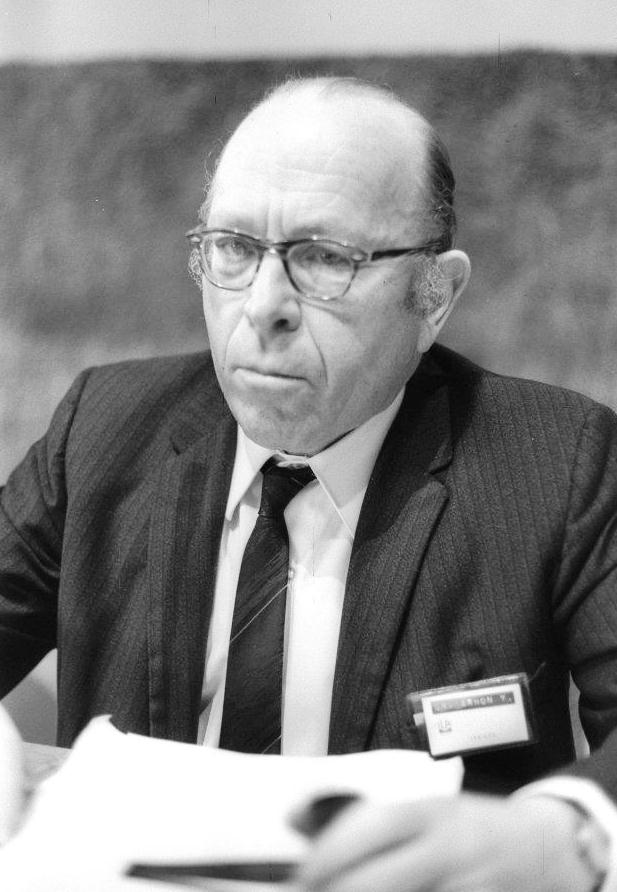
Ya'akov Arnon

Ya'akov Arnon (Hebrew: יעקב ארנון; 1913–1995) was a Dutch Israeli economist and government official in the 1960s who later became active in the Israeli peace movement.

== Biography ==
Born Jacob "Jaap" van Amerongen in Amsterdam, Netherlands to a well off family of Dutch Jewish diamond dealers, Arnon studied economics in his native city. He survived World War II by concealing his Jewish identity. After World War II he led the Zionist Federation of the Netherlands until 1948 when he emigrated to Israel after the war, changed his name and joined the Ministry of Finance under Levi Eshkol to become the new ministry's director-general. In 1965, he initiated policies that led to a serious recession in Israel. He subsequently served as Chairman of the Board of the Israel Electric Corporation.

After the Six-Day War, Arnon co-ordinated a committee of government officials that attempted to implement an "enlightened occupation" of the West Bank and Gaza Strip but which laid the foundations of the ongoing Occupation.

In 1975, he joined with two other dissident establishment figures, Uri Avnery and Mattityahu Peled, to found the Israeli Council for Israeli-Palestinian Peace.

The ICIPP Charter called for Israeli withdrawal from the territories occupied in 1967 and the creation of an independent Palestinian state in these territories, Jerusalem being shared between them. At the time this was considered a very radical plan, which the ICIPP was the first Zionist organization to support.

The ICIPP sought to promote private and unofficial dialogue between Israelis and Palestinians in as many ways as possible, but also to try to bring about official negotiations between the Government of Israel and the leadership of the Palestine Liberation Organization.

Arnon helped found the Sheli party prior to the 1977 elections but as the seventh candidate on the party list was not elected to the Knesset after the party won only 6 seats. He was also a candidate for the Progressive List for Peace in the 1984 elections and was the fourth candidate on the party list; however, only 2 MKs were elected.

In 1980, Arnon went on a clandestine mission to Morocco on the invitation of King Hassan II along with Avnery, Peled and PLO liaison Issam Sartawi.

His Hebrew-language biography, They Called Him Jaap: Jacob Arnon from Amsterdam to Jerusalem, was published in 2010 by Hakibbutz Hameuchad. Yitzhak Rabin biographer Yossi Goldstein wrote its first section, and Aryeh Dayan, author of a book about the history of Shas, wrote the part documenting Arnon's political activity with people from the radical left.

In 1991, he received the award of Yakir Yerushalayim from the city of Jerusalem.

Arnon died in Jerusalem on October 7, 1995 at the age of 82. A street was named after him in Jerusalem shortly after his death.

== See also ==
- List of peace activists
