= TransAtlantic (novel) =

Book by Colum McCann

- First edition
- Author: Colum McCann
- Language: English
- Genre: Novel
- Publisher: Random House (US)
- Publication date: 4 June 2013
- Publication place: United States
- Media type: Print (hardback)
- Pages: 320
- ISBN: 978-1400069590
- Preceded by: Let the Great World Spin

TransAtlantic is a novel by Colum McCann, published in June 2013.

Based upon the book, Colum wrote the lyrics for Clannad's song "TransAtlantic", released with the album Nádúr in September 2013. He also wrote the liner notes for the album.

== Plot ==
It tells the intertwined stories of Alcock and Brown (the first non-stop transatlantic fliers in 1919), the visit of Frederick Douglass to Ireland in 1845/46, and the story of the Irish peace process as negotiated by Senator George Mitchell in 1998. The book fuses these stories with fictional narratives of women spanning the course of two centuries.

== Reviews ==
Reviews for the book have been generally positive. Theo Tait in The Guardian commended McCann's skill as a writer though expressed concern at the plot becoming unwieldy in light of the many themes and story strands present in the novel. The Daily Express also commented favourably on the novel, in particular the novel's "lyrical and emotional power".

It was included on the longlist for the 2013 Man Booker Prize.

McCann discussed the novel on the BBC Radio 4 programme Bookclub in December 2015.

== See also ==
- Frederick Douglass and the White Negro, a documentary on Douglass's experience in Ireland as well as the relationship between African Americans and Irish Americans.
