= Another Side of Peace =

- Directed by: Ellen Frick; Gretchen Burger
- Produced by: Ellen Frick; Gretchen Burger
- Cinematography: Marc Pingry
- Edited by: Gretchen Burger
- Music by: Raef Pearlman
- Release date: 2004
- Running time: 60 minutes

Another Side of Peace is a 2004 human rights documentary film directed by Ellen Frick and Gretchen Burger.

== Documentary background ==
Another Side of Peace was shot in both Israel and Palestine, and features several multi-cultural peace organizations. It chronicles the life of Israeli Roni Hirshenzon, who lost both of his sons to terrorism and subsequently co-founded Parents Circle as a support group for bereaved families who have lost loved ones to the conflict in the Middle East. The film includes historical archival footage and commentary from Hirshenzon and other parents of slain children. Through Parents Circle, Hirshenzon and his Palestinian counterpart Ghazi Brigieth coordinate seminars for families. The men come to terms with their own losses through their work for others.
