= Rami Elhanan =

Israeli peace activist

- רמי אלחנן
- Born: 1950 (age 75–76); Jerusalem
- Occupations: Graphic designer; Peace activist
- Spouse: Nurit Peled
- Relatives: Mattityahu Peled (father-in-law); Miko Peled (brother-in-law)

Rami Elhanan (Hebrew: רמי אלחנן; born c. 1950) is an Israeli graphic designer and peace activist.

== Early life ==
Elhanan, born in Jerusalem, is a sixth-generation Jerusalemite on his mother's side. His father, a Holocaust survivor, immigrated to Mandatory Palestine in 1946. He served in the Israeli Defence Forces as a tank mechanic and was a soldier during the Yom Kippur War in 1973.

== Advocacy ==
On 4 September 1997, Elhanan's daughter Smadar was killed alongside four others following a suicide bomb attack on Ben Yehuda Street, Jerusalem; she had been shopping for schoolbooks at the time. In 1999, Elhanan met Yitzchak Frankenthal, whose own son had been kidnapped and murdered by Hamas militants in 1994; Frankenthal had subsequently established the Parents' Circle-Families Forum for family members of children from both sides killed in the Israeli-Palestinian conflict, who advocated for peace and nonviolence in the region. Following Smadar's death, Elhanan went on to become an active member of the organisation.

Elhanan also became a member of Combatants for Peace, an organisation made up of former Israeli and Palestinian fighters now advocating for peace. Through his membership, he first met Bassam Aramin, a Palestinian man who had served seven years in prison for throwing a grenade at Israeli soldiers. Two years after meeting, in 2007, Aramin's daughter died after being shot with a plastic bullet by an Israeli soldier, and Aramin subsequently became a member of the Parents' Circle.

Since Smadar's death, Elhanan has become a proponent for ending the Israeli occupation of Palestine. Elhanan and Aramin have travelled around the world advocating for a peaceful end to the Israel-Palestine conflict, including the need for concessions on both sides. Both went on to serve as co-directors of the Parents' Circle-Families Forum.

== Personal life ==
Elhanan is married to philologist Nurit Peled, with whom he has three sons and one daughter, Smadar (1983–1997). Elhanan's father-in-law was soldier and politician Matti Peled, while his son Elik was a co-founder of Combatants for Peace.

== Recognition ==
In 2012, a documentary about Elhanan and Aramin, entitled Within the Eye of the Storm, was released. It was directed by Shelley Hermon.

Elhanan and Aramin's friendship formed the basis of the novel Apeirogon (2020) by Irish writer Colum McCann. The book was longlisted for the Booker Prize and shortlisted for the Prix Médicis.
