= Dancer (novel) =

Novel

- First hardcover edition (2003)
- Author: Colum McCann
- Publisher: Weidenfeld
- Publication date: 2003
- Pages: 352
- ISBN: 9780805067927

Dancer is a novel based on the life of Rudolf Nureyev, written by Colum McCann and published in 2003.

== Background ==
Nureyev was a Russian ballet dancer who achieved fame with the Kirov Ballet before defecting to the West in 1961 and subsequently became "one of the most written-about dancers in history". He died in 1992. McCann, born in Ireland, had previously written novels, short stories and newspaper reports while travelling and teaching in the United States and Japan; some of his work was set in Ireland and Northern Ireland. In 2001, already having "a growing reputation as an international writer", he moved to Russia where he researched his novel based on Nureyev while teaching English. A decade after the book's publication, McCann commented that he personally saw Nureyev as "a monster".

== Plot and structure ==
The book begins on the Eastern Front during World War II, with Nureyev performing for injured Soviet soldiers as a child. It covers his good fortune in gaining the chance to study ballet in his home country, his success there and then his life, work, loves and excesses as a celebrity after his defection to the West.

The story is told partly through brief journal entries portrayed as written by Nureyev himself, and partly through narration by characters who knew him. The latter include his childhood dance instructor, his sister, his dance partner, and his maid. These each have their own perspectives and concerns, with sub-plots that add complexity and emotion to the story. The book does not mention Nureyev's death from AIDS.

== Critical reception ==
Reviewing the book for The Guardian, Judith Mackrell said that it provides "a sharp, enthralling and sometimes scarily acute antidote to the reams of generalised gush that have been written about Nureyev", and that "any reader with a reasonable knowledge of Nureyev's life will follow in its tracks with serious pleasure". She suggested that for those who do not already know the facts of the story, frustration may be caused by McCann's approach of highlighting snapshots of brilliance and hectic energy while not elaborating sufficiently on the details of the historical events.

Possible frustration was also mentioned by Suzy Hansen's review in Salon, in that the book does not give a clear picture of just what it is that makes Nureyev tick. Despite this, and some lengthy passages that she felt added little to the story, Hansen concluded that McCann achieves a beautifully imagined picture of the effects of a genius on those around him, without needing to define the exact nature of the genius himself.

Lisa Allardice, writing in The Daily Telegraph, found Dancer too long and "unchoreographed in places", but praised it for its imaginative detail, its effective and absorbing writing style, and its success in capturing the spirit of its subject. In The Stinging Fly, David Woelfel also expressed admiration for McCann's energetic and intense prose, although he found the descriptions of some characters in the West clichéd, and those of some events in the East to be "retrospective grandstanding".

Terry Teachout's review in The Baltimore Sun described the book as "an engrossing portrait" and said that its portrayal of Nureyev was "entirely convincing"; Teachout also praised the detailed research that McCann had undertaken to make the many different aspects of the story entirely authentic in their portrayals.
