= Bronisława Wajs =

Polish-Romani poet and singer (1908–1987)

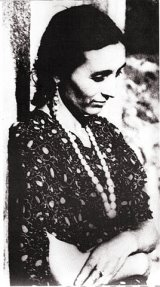
- Born: 17 August 1908; Lublin, Lublin Governorate Congress Poland
- Died: 8 February 1987 (aged 78); Inowrocław, Poland
- Occupations: Poet, singer
- Writing career
- Period: 20th century

Bronisława Wajs (17 August 1908, Lublin – 8 February 1987, Inowrocław), commonly known by her Romani name Papusza (meaning Doll), was a Polish-Romani classic poet and singer.

== Life ==
Bronisława Wajs grew up nomadically with her family in Poland as part of a kumpania, or band of families. She was literate, unusual for Polska Roma of that time. She learned to read by trading chickens in exchange for lessons with local villagers. This was frowned upon and whenever she was found reading she was beaten and the book destroyed. She was married in a traditional ceremony at 15 to a revered harpist named Dionizy Wajs, who was 24 years her senior. She was very unhappy with the marriage and took to singing as an outlet for her frustrations, with her husband often accompanying her on harp. Soon after learning to sing she began to compose her own ballads and songs based on traditional Romani story-telling and songwriting.

In 1949 Papusza's kumpania settled in Żagań in Western Poland. That same year, she was heard by the Polish poet Jerzy Ficowski, who instantly recognized her talent. Many of her poems dealt with "Nostos" (Greek for "a return home"), a theme common in Romani poetry. Although Roma used this to describe the yearning to return to the open road, Ficowski saw this as Papusza yearning to be settled down, to no longer be nomadic. He translated and published several of her poems in a magazine called Problemy along with an interview with Polish poet Julian Tuwim. Although the poem made Papusza known for the first time among the Polish audience, the interview and, above all, the Romani-Polish minidictionary attached to it, caused a negative turn in the poet's life, as she was accused of revealing the secrets of her native culture to the gadjos. Her activities were associated by some Roma with the simultaneous moves of the Polish communist government that found its culmination in September 1952 (known variously as 'Action C', or "The Great Halt", which aimed at creating the first census of the Polish Sinti and Roma, their registration and obligatory assignment of ID cards). Accusations of Papusza and Ficowski as supporters, even unintentional of the forced settlement of Roma are even now not uncommon, although the law imposing a ban on wandering was not introduced until 1964. Similar legislation began to spring up in neighboring countries such as Czechoslovakia (1958), Bulgaria (1958), and Romania (1962). Papusza herself settled in the western Polish city of Gorzów Wielkopolski, spending most of the rest of her life in a house on Kosynierów Gdyńskich street which today bears a plaque dedicated to her. In 1962, Pupusza joined the Polish Writers' Union.

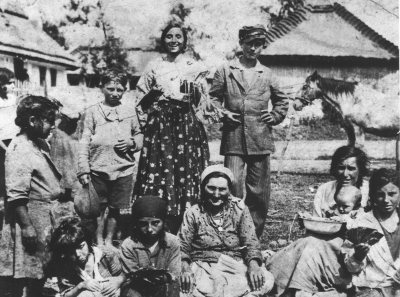
Bronislawa Wajs (1930)

The Roma community soon began to regard Papusza as a traitor, threatening her and calling her names, either for revealing the details of the Romani language, culture, customs and common law, for her contacts with gadjos, or for her alleged role in the anti-nomadic moves of the government. Papusza maintained that Ficowski had exploited her work and had taken it out of context. Her appeals fell on deaf ears and the Baro Shero (Big head, an elder in the Roma community) declared her "unclean". She was banished from the Roma world, and her contacts with Ficowski died out. Afterward, she spent 8 months in a mental hospital and then the next 34 years of her life alone and isolated. In 1981 she moved in with her sister's family in Kujawy. She died in 1987 and was buried in St. Joseph's cemetery. Ficowski remained her major admirer and eulogist, popularising her legacy and unique place in Polish and Romani culture throughout his later life.

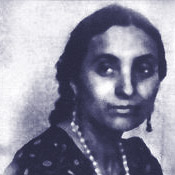
Bronisława Wajs

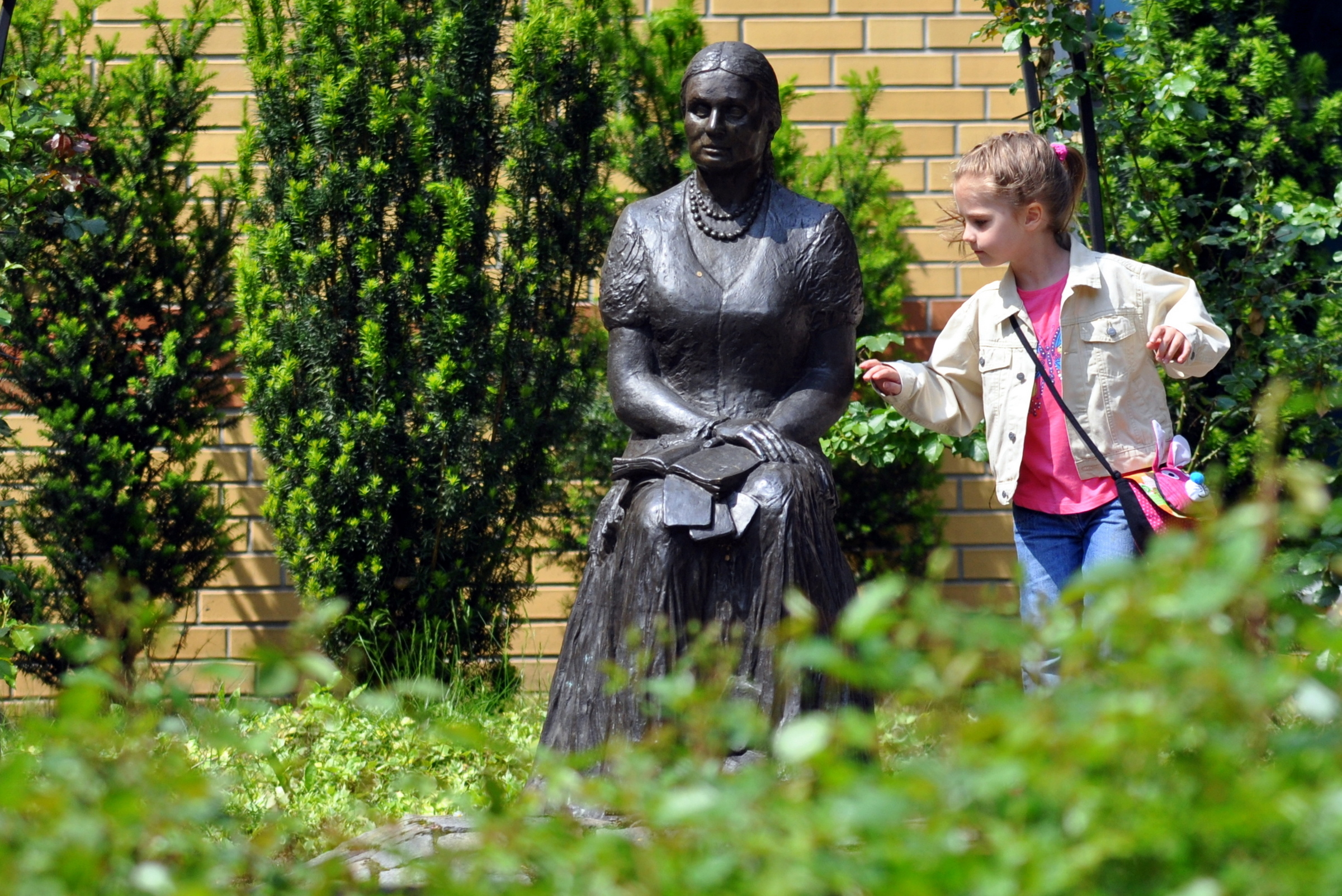
Memorial statue of Bronisława in Gorzów Wielkopolski

== Works ==
Papusza's most important work is the 1952 witness account of the Roma Holocaust, namely, the song (written down as a narrative poem) Tears of Blood (Ratwała jaswa).

Most of Papusza's work involved traditional Roma formats along with some unusual aspects such as writing in singular form. Most of her work dealt with nostalgia, longing, and (especially) feeling lost.

"...the water does not look behind
It flees, runs farther away
Where eyes will not see her,
the water wanders..."

She published poems frequently from the late 1940s to the mid-'50s, when she was removed from Roma life, first in Polish literary magazines and then in books of her own. She published again for a short time in the late '60s.

=== Publications ===
- Papusza / Bronisława Wajs. 2024. Tears of Blood A Poet’s Witness Account of the Nazi Genocide of Roma. Edited by Volha Bartash, Tomasz Kamusella, and Viktor Shapoval (Ser.: Roma History and Culture, Vol. 4). Brill. NB: Romani original and English translation (by Hamish MacDonald), alongside scholarly chapters on the narrative poem's historical and cultural context.
- Papusza. 1952. Ratvale jasva (Tears of Blood), the Romani original read by Viktor Shapoval (2025).

== Legacy ==
- In 1974, a documentary film entitled Papusza was directed by Maja Wójcik and Ryszard Wójcik. It presents the customs and life of the Roma community. The main protagonists of the film were Bronisława Wajs and Jerzy Ficowski.
- In 1991, a film Historia Cyganki (A Gypsy Girl's Story) was directed by Greg Kowalski featuring music by Jan Kanty Pawluśkiewicz.
- Romani theater "Romance" in Ukraine made a performance about Papusza.
- There is a monument to Papusza in Gorzów Wielkopolski.
- Zoli, the fourth novel of the Irish-born American writer Colum McCann follows the life of Marienka Novotna, nicknamed "Zoli", a fictional Slovak Romani woman. Her life is loosely based on that of Bronisława Wajs: Zoli explores the persecution of the Roma faced during World War II, as well as the impact of socialism on Romani culture and lifestyles.
- A Polish film about her life, titled Papusza, was released in 2013. It was directed by Joanna Kos-Krauze and Krzysztof Krauze and stars Jowita Budnik in the title role.
- In 2013, Andżelika Kuźniak published a book, Papusza, about the life and literary legacy of Bronisława Wajs.

== See also ==
- Zoli, a novel loosely based on the life of Wajs
