= Zoli =

First UK edition (publ. Weidenfeld & Nicolson Cover artist: Natasha Webber)

Zoli is a novel by Colum McCann. It follows the life of Marienka Novotna, nicknamed "Zoli", a Slovak Romani woman, from her childhood in the 1930s, through her exile in the 1950s, to her late adult life. Although Zoli is a fictional character, her life is loosely based on that of the Polish Romani poet Papusza (Bronisława Wajs).

Zoli explores the persecution of the Roma faced during World War II, as well as the impact of totalitarianism on Romani culture and lifestyles and experiences of otherness and marginalisation faced by Romani people in Europe. The novel is written from multiple perspectives, that include both first and third person narration.

== See also ==
- Fictional representations of Roma
