= Jerzy Ficowski =

Polish poet, writer and translator

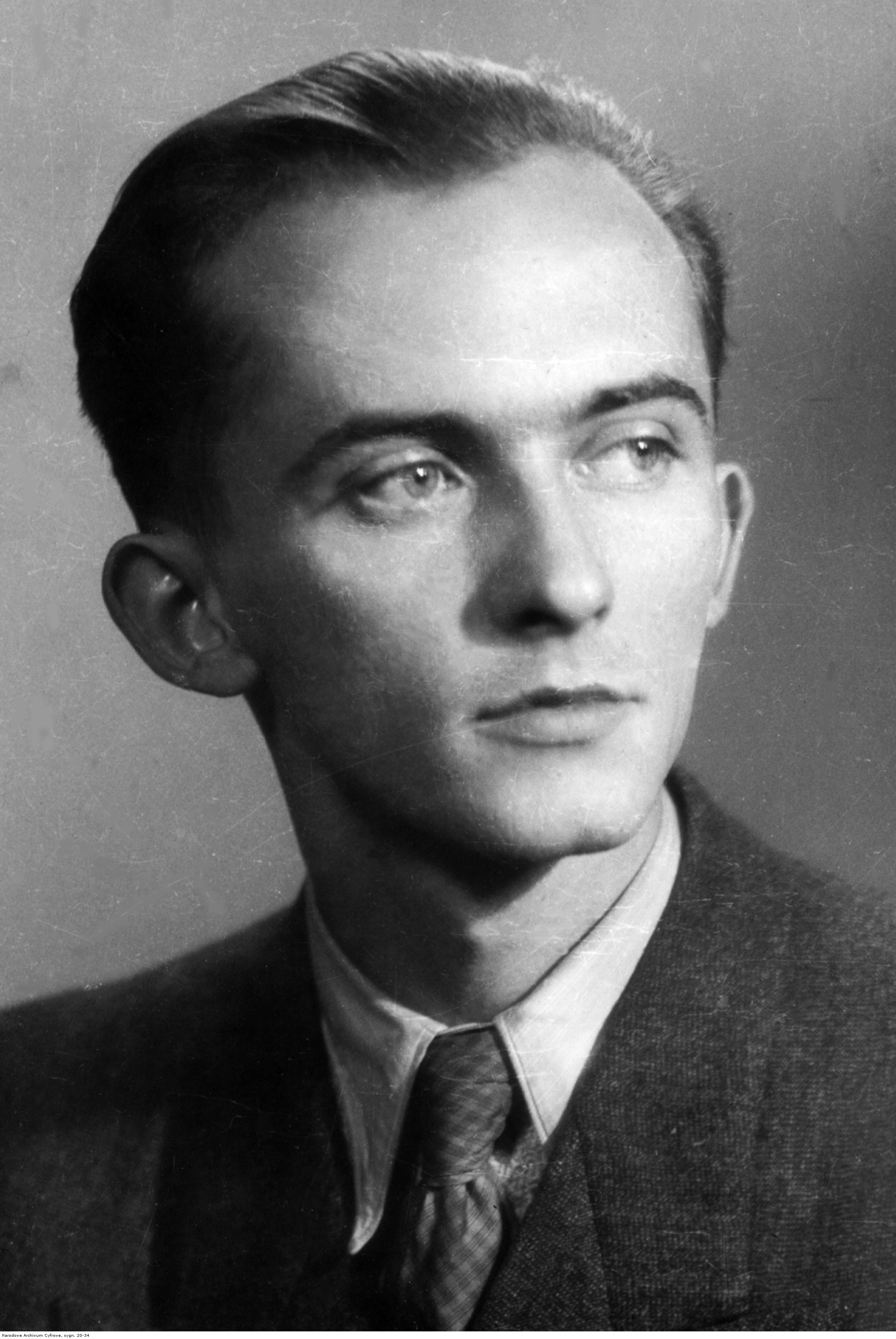
- Jerzy Ficowski, Warsaw (Poland), 2002
- Born: 4 October 1924; Warsaw, Poland
- Died: 9 May 2006 (aged 81); Warsaw, Poland
- Writing career
- Language: Polish
- Genres: Poetry, prose

Jerzy Tadeusz Ficowski (Polish pronunciation: [ˈjɛʐɨ fiˈt͡sɔfskʲi]; 4 October 1924 in Warsaw – 9 May 2006 in Warsaw) was a Polish poet, writer, ethnographer and translator (from Yiddish, Russian, Romani and Hungarian).

== Biography and works ==
During the German occupation of Poland in World War II, Ficowski who lived in Włochy near Warsaw was a member of the Polish resistance. He was a member of the Home Army (Armia Krajowa, AK), was imprisoned in the infamous Pawiak and took part in the Warsaw Uprising of 1944. His codename was Wrak and he fought in Mokotów region. Following the Warsaw Uprising, Ficowski entered a camp with other survivors of the battle.

After the war, Ficowski returned to Warsaw and enrolled at the university in order to study philosophy and sociology. There he published his first volume of poetry, Ołowiani żołnierze (The Tin Soldiers, 1948). This volume reflected the Stalinist atmosphere of the early postwar Poland, in which heroes of the Armia Krajowa Warsaw Uprising were treated with suspicion at best, arrested and executed at worst, together with the sense of a new city arising from the ashes of the old.

His early works show the influence of Julian Tuwim. Later he became interested in the poems of the interwar period, with elements of fantasy and grotesque. In the later period his poems reflected various moral and social aspects of life in the People's Republic of Poland.

From 1948 to 1950 Ficowski chose to travel with Polish Gypsies and came to write several volumes on or inspired by the Roma way of life, including Amulety i defilacje (Amulets and Definitions, 1960) and Cyganie na polskich drogach (Gypsies on the Polish Roads, 1965). He was the member of the Gypsy Lore Society and translated the poems of Bronisława Wajs (Papusza). He was interested in many aspects of international poetry. He translated the poems of the Spanish poet, Federico García Lorca, and he was also a known specialist of Jewish folklore and Modern Hebrew poetry, becoming an editor of the Jewish poem anthology Rodzynki z migdałami (Raisins with Almonds, 1964).

Ficowski devoted many years of his life to the study of the life and works of Bruno Schulz, and in 1967 published the first edition of what is considered the definitive biography of him, entitled Regions of the Great Heresy. He received the award of the Polish Pen Club in 1977. His 1979 collection of poems, A Reading of Ashes, has been called the most moving account of the Holocaust written by a non-Jew.

As a consequence of his signing, in 1975, of the letter of 59, practically all of Ficowski's writings had become banned in Poland for the remainder of the decade, and only the emergence of Solidarity in the early 1980s has brought his works back to Poland's bookshelves. Both his prose and poems continued to be widely translated in the West. He was active in the opposition movement, and was a member of the Workers' Defence Committee (Komitet Obrony Robotników, KOR) and subsequently of the Committee for Social Self-defence KOR.

Under the communist regime he had urged his fellow writers to voice their concerns over censorship and the suppression of workers. His most public statement was a letter to the Writers Union in which he said, "I do not believe deeply in the immediate effectiveness of letters to the government, but even less do I believe in the effectiveness of silence."

Following the fall of communism, liberalisation of Poland and its breaking with the Soviet bloc, Ficowski continued to write and translate works from languages as diverse as Spanish and Romanian, not to mention the Yiddish and Roma languages that had always fascinated him.

== Selected publications ==
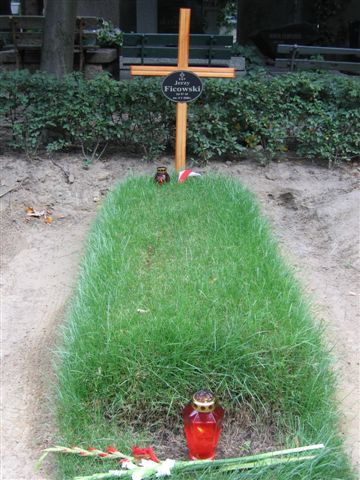
Jerzy Ficowski's monument, Cmentarz Komunalny (d. Wojskowy) - Powązki, Warsaw (Poland), 30 July 2006

Poetry

- Ołowiani żołnierze (1948)
- Zwierzenia (1952)
- Po polsku (1955)
- Moje strony świata (1957)
- Makowskie bajki (1959)
- Amulety i defilacje ("Amulets and Definitions") (1960), inspired by his stay with Gypsies
- Pismo obrazkowe (1962)
- Ptak poza ptakiem (1968)
- Odczytanie popiołów (1979); on the Jews and their suffering; illustrated by Marc Chagall; translated by Keith Bosley as A Reading of Ashes, 1981)
- Errata (1981)
- Śmierć jednorożca (1981)
- Przepowiednie. Pojutrznia (1983)
- Inicjał (1994)
- Mistrz Manole i inne przekłady (2004; collected translations of poetry)
- Zawczas z poniewczasem (2004)
- Pantareja (2006)

Poetic prose

- Wspominki starowarszawskie (1959)
- Czekanie na sen psa (1970; translated by Soren A. Gauger and Marcin Piekoszewski as Waiting for the Dog to Sleep, 2006)

Others

- Cyganie polscy (1953)
- Cyganie na polskich drogach (1965)
- Gałązka z drzewa słońca (1961)
- Rodzynki z migdałami (1964)
- Regiony wielkiej herezji (1967, revised editions 1975, 1992, 2002; translated by Theodosia S. Robertson as Regions of the Great Heresy, 2000)
- Okolice sklepów cynamonowych (1986)
- Demony cudzego strachu (1986)
- Cyganie w Polsce. Dzieje i obyczaje (1989; translated by Eileen Healey as The Gypsies in Poland. History and Customs, 1989)
- Letters and Drawings of Bruno Schulz, with Selected Prose (1988, edited by Jerzy Ficowski; translated by Walter Arndt, with Victoria Nelson Harper & Row, NY)
