= Apeirogon (novel) =

2020 novel by Colum McCann

- First edition
- Author: Colum McCann
- Language: English
- Genre: Novel
- Publisher: Random House (US)
- Publication date: 25 February 2020
- Publication place: United States
- Media type: Print (hardback)
- Pages: 480
- ISBN: 9781400069606
- Preceded by: TransAtlantic

Apeirogon is a novel by Colum McCann, published in February 2020. The novel explores the Israeli–Palestinian conflict. It follows the story of two men who each lost a daughter. One is Palestinian, the other Israeli.

== Plot ==
The story follows two real life figures: Rami Elhanan, an Israeli graphic designer, and Bassam Aramin, a Palestinian scholar who, when he was 17, had been sentenced to a 7 year term of imprisonment for throwing stones at Israeli soldiers. Consisting of 1001 short sections, the two central figures bond over the violent deaths of their respective daughters. The 14 year old Smadar Elhanan was one of 5 people killed in 1997 as a result of a Hamas suicide bombing attack along the pedestrian mall of Ben Yehuda Street. Abir Aramin, aged 10, died from a gunshot wound to the head fired by an Israeli Border policeman, while she was returning home from school in 'Anata in 2007.

The book briefly covers numerous other topics and tales:

- Bird Migration -- especially around Israel and the Middle East
- Philippe Petit's 1987 tightrope walk, A Bridge for Peace, across Hinnom Valley between East and West Jerusalem.
- Bedouin shepherd who lost a goat and found the Dead Sea Scrolls.
- 1835 journey of Christopher Costigan exploring Biblical sites around the Dead Sea and Jordan river with a Maltese sailor.
- One Thousand and One Nights -- origins and important translations.
- John Cage's piece 4′33″ which instructs the musicians not to play their instruments throughout the three movements of the piece. He originally conceived of the piece as being titled Silent Prayer.

== Reviews ==
Charles Finch in The Washington Post described the book as "a loving, thoughtful, grueling novel". Shoiab Alam, writing in The Daily Star, hailed the novel as "a masterful and timely literary response to [the] region's neverending horrors." However, the international best-selling Palestinian-American writer Susan Abulhawa calls it "Another colonialist misstep in commercial publishing" that "mystifies the colonisation of Palestine as a ‘complicated conflict’ between two equal sides".

== Awards ==
Year	Award	Category	Result	Ref
2020	Booker Prize	—	Longlisted	
2020	Prix du Meilleur Livre Étranger	Novel	Won	
2020	Prix Médicis	étranger	Shortlisted	
2021	Andrew Carnegie Medal for Excellence	Fiction	Longlisted	
2021	Dalkey Literary Awards	—	Shortlisted	
