= Colum McCann =

Irish author (born 1965)

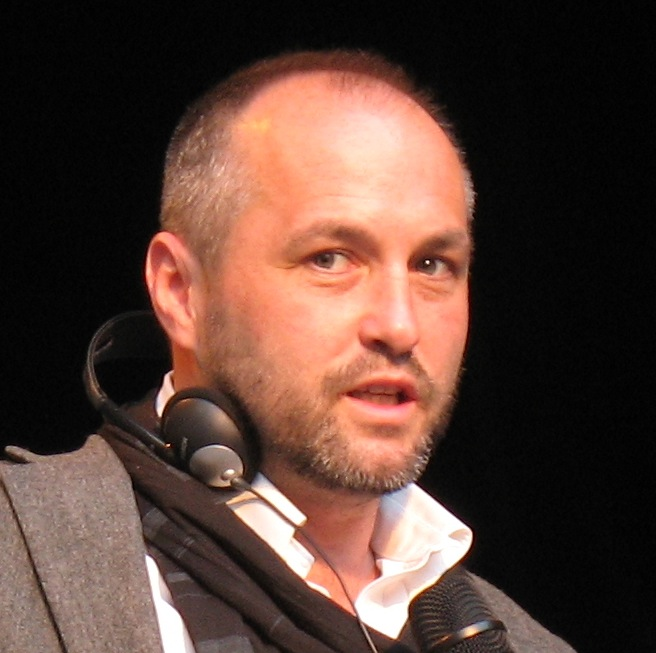
- Born: Colum McCann; February 28, 1965 (age 61); Dublin, Ireland
- Education: Journalism
- Alma mater: Dublin Institute of Technology University of Texas at Austin
- Occupation: Writer
- Writing career
- Language: English
- Genre: Literary fiction
- Notable works: Let the Great World Spin; Apeirogon; TransAtlantic
- Notable awards: Rooney Prize; Novel of the Year Award; National Book Award; International Dublin Literary Award
- Movement: Postmodern literature
- Website: colummccann.com

Colum McCann (born February 28, 1965) is an Irish writer of literary fiction. He was born in Dublin, Ireland, and currently resides in New York. Awards he has won include the U.S. National Book Award and the International Dublin Literary Award, and his work has been published in over 40 languages as well as being published in many American and international publications. He also is the co-founder and president of Narrative 4, an international empathy education nonprofit.

McCann is the author of eight novels, including Apeirogon (2020), TransAtlantic (2013) and the National Book Award-winning Let the Great World Spin (2009). Three collections of short stories have been published, including Thirteen Ways of Looking, released in October 2015. American Mother was released in March 2024 and tells the story of Diane Foley, whose son, James Foley, was captured and killed by ISIS while serving as a freelance combat reporter in Syria. His latest novel, Twist, was released in March 2025.

== Early life and education ==
McCann's mother is from Derry in Northern Ireland, and he spent summers with his family there. His father, Sean McCann, was features editor for the Evening Press newspaper in Dublin, and a prolific author. Colum remembers following his father around the newsroom and seeing the writing process in action. McCann started writing at age eleven, when he rode his bike around Dun Laoghaire reporting on local football matches for The Irish Press.

Despite his father's advice to "not become a journalist", McCann began his career as a newspaper writer. He studied journalism at the College of Commerce in Rathmines, Dublin (now a part of the Technological University Dublin). While at school, he wrote for a number of newspapers, including the Irish Independent and the Evening Herald, and in 1983 he was named "Young Journalist of the Year". McCann has said that his time in newspapers gave him an excellent platform from which to launch a career in fiction.

== Career ==
=== Move to the U.S. ===
McCann moved to the United States in the summer of 1986 to become a fiction writer. He first lived in Hyannis, Massachusetts, where he worked on a golf course and as a cab driver. That summer, he bought a typewriter and tried to write "the great Irish American novel", but quickly realized that he wasn't up to the task and that he'd need "to get some experience beyond my immediate white-bread world". Between 1986 and 1988 he took a bicycle across the United States, travelling 12,000 kilometres (about 8,000 miles). "Part of the reason for the trip was simply to expand my lungs emotionally", he said, to come in contact with what he calls "a true democracy of voices".

During the trip, he stayed with Native Americans in Gallup, New Mexico, lived with Amish people in Pennsylvania, fixed bikes in Colorado, and dug ditches to help fight fires in Idaho. He found that the people he met would confide their deepest secrets in him, even though they had just met. He credits those voices—and that trip—with developing his ability to listen to other people.

In 1988, he moved to Brenham, Texas, where he worked as a wilderness educator with at-risk youth. He spent two years finishing his undergraduate education at University of Texas at Austin and was inducted into Phi Beta Kappa. While at UT, a story he published in a campus literary magazine was included in Britain's Best Short Stories of 1993, an early success in his young literary career.

=== Early works ===
In 1993, McCann moved to Japan with his wife Allison, whom he had married the previous year. The couple both taught English, and McCann worked on finishing his first short-story collection, Fishing the Sloe-Black River, and started his first novel, Songdogs. After a year and a half, the couple moved back to New York City where he, his wife and their three children—Isabella, John Michael, and Christian—still reside. In 1994, following the publication of Fishing the Sloe-Black River, McCann won the Rooney Prize, which is awarded to an "emerging Irish writer under forty years of age" with "an outstanding body of work".

Though McCann's early works were well-reviewed, they were not commercially successful enough to support him full-time. Throughout the 1990s, McCann wrote plays and film scripts, including the Veronica Guerin bio-pic When the Sky Falls and the play Flaherty's Windows, which ran for six weeks Off-Broadway.

=== Finding success as a novelist ===
This Side of Brightness (1998) was McCann's first international bestseller. The novel revolves around the New York City subway, following the "sandhogs" who built its tunnels in the early 1900s and the homeless people who lived in the tunnels in the 1980s. He was inspired by two instances in the early 1900s when men were blown out of subway tunnels into rivers due to explosions. While researching the novel, McCann descended into the subway tunnels three or four times per week. He recalled that, "Being Irish helped me—I was never seen as part of the established order, the system. I was outside. And they were outsiders too. So often I felt aligned with the people who were living underground."

In 2000, McCann released Everything in This Country Must, a collection of two short stories and a novella about The Troubles. He grounded the three stories in the conflict, but maintains "an imaginative distance" between reality and his writing, a common sentiment in his works. McCann teamed up with Gary McKendry to turn the collection's titular story into a short film. After its 2004 release, the film was nominated for the Academy Award for Best Live Action Short Film in the 77th Academy Awards.

McCann's next novel, Dancer, is a fictionalized account of Rudolf Nureyev's life. McCann spent the summer of 2001 teaching English in Russia to research the novel. The book was published on the tenth anniversary of Nureyev's death.

For his 2006 novel Zoli, McCann expanded on previously explored themes such as exile, social outcasting, empathy, and fictionalizing historical events. The main character is a fictionalization of Polish-Romani poet Bronisława Wajs (Papusza). While researching the novel, McCann spent two months in Europe visiting Romani camps.

=== Let the Great World Spin and international recognition ===
As of 2008 McCann was a Thomas Hunter Writer in Residence at Hunter College, New York.

McCann's seventh book (his fifth novel) vaulted him into the international spotlight. Let the Great World Spin (2008) is set on 7 August 1974, the morning that Philippe Petit walked on a high wire between the Twin Towers of the World Trade Center in New York City. The novel follows characters who live in New York City, some of whom saw Petit's walk. The book is an allegory to 9/11, but only mentions the attacks in one line. McCann's father-in-law worked in the North Tower and walked up to McCann's apartment on the Upper East Side after escaping the building. McCann's young daughter said her grandfather was "burning from the inside out", a line that struck McCann as a beautiful metaphor for the nation.

Let the Great World Spin was received with great critical acclaim. For the book, McCann won the 2009 National Book Award for Fiction, the first Irish-born writer to take home the award. The novel also won the 2011 International Dublin Literary Award, among many others. J. J. Abrams discussed working with McCann to make the novel into a movie.

=== 2010s writings ===
In 2010, McCann put his words in a different medium, collaborating with Alonzo King to put on a ballet titled Writing Ground. The show, part of the Ballets de Monte Carlo, was put up by Alonzo King LINES Ballet. McCann's poetry is in the ballet's program but was not spoken in the dances itself. Instead, the dances were set to sacred music from different global cultures.

In 2013, McCann published his eighth book, TransAtlantic. Like many of McCann's other books, the novel uses multiple characters and voices to tell a story based on real events. The book tells the intertwined stories of Alcock and Brown (the first non-stop transatlantic fliers in 1919), the visit of Frederick Douglass to Ireland in 1845/46, and the story of the Irish peace process as negotiated by Senator George Mitchell in 1998. At first, McCann thought about just writing about Douglass's visit, but he said "then it would have been a historical novel and ... hate the term ... It just seems steeped in aspic. I mean every novel's a historical novel anyway. But calling something a historical novel seems to put mittens on it, right? It puts manners on it. And you don't want your novels to be mannered." McCann lived just a few blocks from Senator Mitchell in New York City, but did not meet him until he finished a draft of the book.

In the summer of 2014, McCann was assaulted outside a hotel in New Haven, Connecticut, while trying to help a woman who was being beaten up on the street. McCann told The Irish Times that "The irony of it all is that I was at a conference on 'Empathy' at Yale University with a non-profit I’m involved in, Narrative 4." At this point, he had already started writing his next short story collection, Thirteen Ways of Looking. The book contains three short stories and a novella, each beginning with a stanza from Wallace Stevens's poem, "Thirteen Ways of Looking at a Blackbird". Though the titular story is about an on-street assault, he wrote it before being attacked. After Thirteen Ways of Looking's October 2015 release, it went on to win a Pushcart Prize. The story "Sh'khol" was included in The Best American Short Stories 2015. The story "What Time is it Now, Where You Are?" was short-listed for the Writing.ie Short Story of the Year 2015. and for the Sunday Times EFG Short Story Award 2016.

Each week throughout 2016, McCann wrote a blog post giving a piece of advice to young writers (posted on his website here). The edited collection, Letters to a Young Writer, was published by Random House in 2017.

In 2019, McCann returned to playwriting, collaborating with Aedin Moloney to write Yes! Reflections of Molly Bloom. The one-woman show is adapted from James Joyce's novel Ulysses and centers around the Molly Bloom soliloquy. The show ran at the Irish Repertory Theatre in 2019, online in 2020, and again at the Irish Rep in 2022.

=== 2020s: Apeirogon, American Mother, and upcoming works ===
Throughout the late 2010s, McCann travelled to the Middle East and started work on his seventh novel, Apeirogon. In the early stages of writing, he said "I'm going to write the novel that has not the two-state solution, but the two-story solution." Published in February 2020, the book shares the story of two men—one Israeli, and one Palestinian—whose daughters died in the Israeli-Palestinian conflict. Rami Elhanan, an Israeli graphic designer, lost his daughter to a Palestinian suicide bomber. Bassam Aramin, a Palestinian scholar and previous political prisoner, lost his daughter to an IDF rubber bullet. The pair met in the Parents Circle, a cross-cultural group where parents whose children died due to the conflict can come together and share their stories. McCann calls Apeirogon his “Narrative 4 novel” due to its focus on empathy and unlikely connections. Apeirogon was positively received, gaining a place on the Booker Prize longlist and winning the Prix du Meilleur Livre Étranger.

His next book, American Mother, was released in March 2024. It tells the story of Diane Foley, whose son, James Foley, was captured and killed by ISIS while serving as a freelance combat reporter in Syria. Foley was once photographed while reading Let the Great World Spin, which floored McCann after Foley died: "There's a photograph of him online reading my book, Let the Great World Spin, and I was shocked by that, absolutely shocked. I was reading the news reports when he was killed, and I saw this photograph, and I looked at the book he was reading."

His next novel, Twist, was released in March 2025.

== Recognition, awards, and honours ==
McCann's work has been published in over 40 languages, and has appeared in The New York Times, New Yorker, Esquire, Paris Review, The Atlantic Monthly, Granta, as well as other international publications.

Among his honors are the U.S. National Book Award, the International Dublin Literary Award, several major European awards, and an Oscar nomination.

McCann has received a Pushcart Prize, Rooney Prize, Irish Novel of the Year Award and the 2002 Ireland Fund of Monaco Princess Grace Memorial Literary Award. Esquire Magazine named him "Best and Brightest" young novelist in 2003. He is a member of Aosdána, and was inducted into the Hennessy Literary Awards Hall of Fame in 2005, having been named Hennessy New Irish Writer 15 years earlier.

McCann won the National Book Award in 2009, for Let the Great World Spin. He was also that year honoured as Chevalier des Arts et Lettres by the French government. He has also received the Deauville Festival Literary Prize: the Ambassador Award, the inaugural Medici Book Club Prize and was the overall winner of the Grinzane Award in Italy.

McCann spoke at the 2010 Boston College First Year Academic Convocation, about his book Let the Great World Spin.

In 2009, Let the Great World Spin was named Amazon.com's "Book of the Year". In 2010, McCann received a Guggenheim Fellowship from the John Simon Guggenheim Memorial Foundation. He received a literary award from the American Academy of Arts and Letters in 2011 and became a full member in 2014. Let the Great World Spin won the 2011 International Dublin Literary Award, one of the more lucrative literary awards in the world. Afterwards, McCann lauded fellow nominees William Trevor and Yiyun Li, suggesting that either would have been worthy winners instead. In 2025, Amazon named Let The Great World Spin one of the best books of the past 25 years.

In 2012, the Dublin Institute of Technology gave McCann an honorary degree. In 2013, he received an honorary degree from Queen's University, Belfast. Transatlantic was long-listed for the 2013 Man Booker Prize. In 2016, he was named a finalist for The Story Prize for Thirteen Ways of Looking.

On 27 July 2020 he was again long-listed for the Man Booker Prize, this time for Apeirogon.

== In popular culture ==
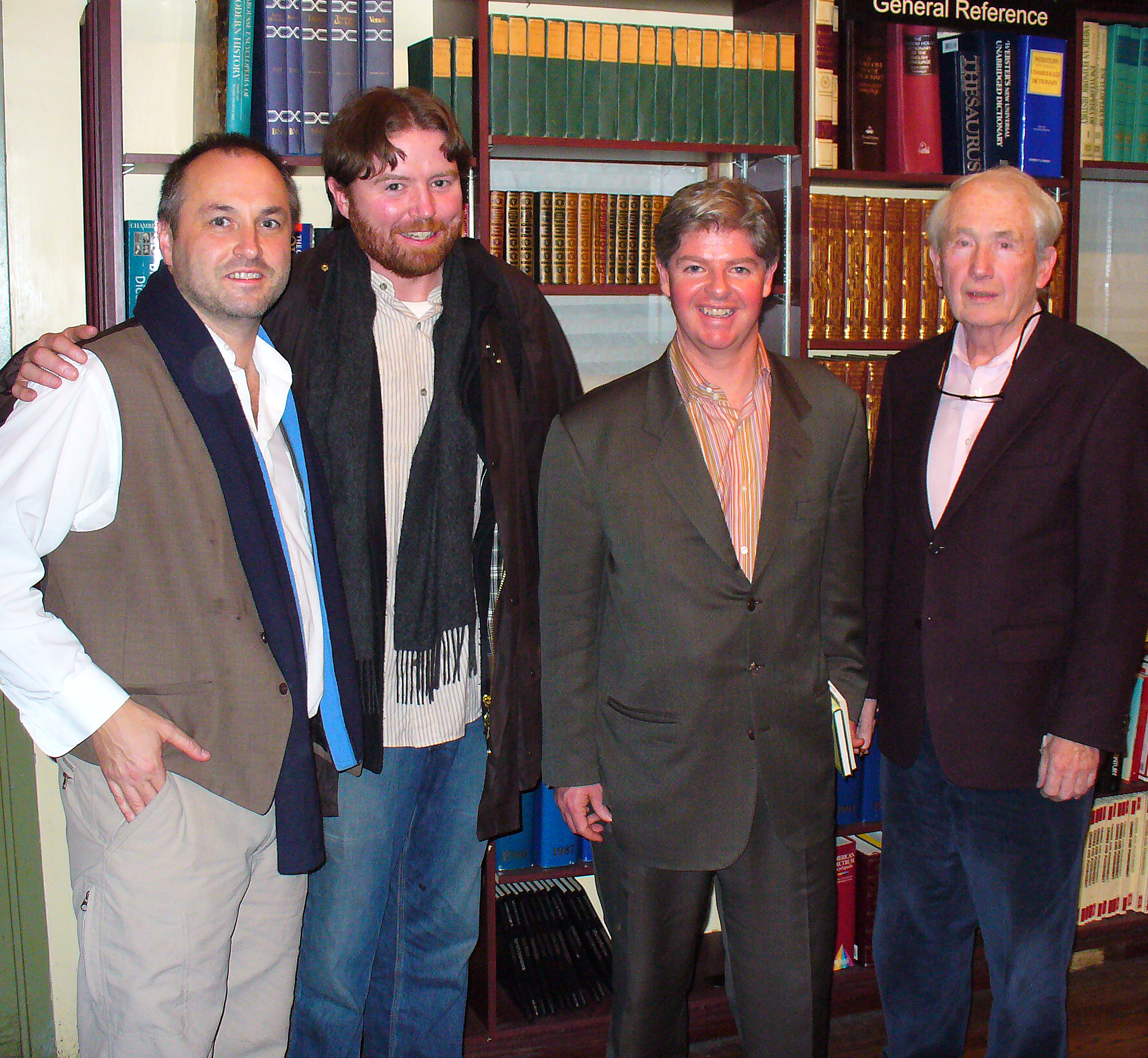
McCann, Christy Kelly, Christopher Cahill and Frank McCourt at New York City's Housing Works bookstore for a tribute to the then-recently deceased Irish poet Benedict Kiely

McCann used to write in a ninth-floor apartment sitting with a computer device on his lap on the floor of a cupboard with no windows located between "two very tight walls," surrounded by messages written by himself and others.

"I believe in the democracy of storytelling," said McCann in a 2013 interview. "I love the fact that our stories can cross all sorts of borders and boundaries."

"The best writers attempt to become alternative historians," McCann said. "My sense of the Great Depression is guided by the works of Doctorow, for instance. My perception of Dublin in the early 20th century is almost entirely guided by my reading of Ulysses." "I think it is our job, as writers, to be epic. Epic and tiny at the same time. If you're going to be a fiction writer, why not take on something that means something," McCann said in an interview. "In doing this, you must understand that within that epic structure it is the tiny story that is possibly more important."

Edna O'Brien told The New York Times "By The Book" that she would choose McCann to write her life story.

Pope Francis quoted McCann in the afterword of the May 2022 book The Weaving of the World (La Tessitura del Mondo), sharing McCann's words that storytelling is “one of the most powerful means we have for changing our world” and "our great democracy" that we all have access to, which transcends borders, shatters stereotypes and "gives us access to the full flowering of the human heart".

Bono told The New York Times "By The Book" that McCann's Apeirogon was one of the greatest books he had read recently, saying, "I love timeline transportations. I enjoy tangential views of a core theme. I not only discovered the word 'Apeirogon,' I rediscovered murmuration as a most powerful symbol for the times that are a changin' shape."

== Philanthropy ==
McCann is active in New York and Irish-based charities, in particular PEN, the American Ireland Fund, the New York Public Library, the Norman Mailer Colony, and Roddy Doyle's creative writing centre Fighting Words.

=== Narrative 4 ===
In June 2012, with Lisa Consiglio and a group of other writers, educators and social activists, McCann co-founded Narrative 4, a global nonprofit, and still serves as board president. Narrative 4's mission is to "harness the power of stories to equip and embolden young adults to improve their lives, communities and the world". "It's like a United Nations for young storytellers," McCann said. "The whole idea behind it is that the one true democracy we have is storytelling. It goes across borders, boundaries, genders, rich, poor—everybody has a story to tell."

Following the Sandy Hook Elementary School shooting in December 2012, two Newtown High School English teachers wrote to McCann telling him that they believed Let The Great World Spin could help their students work through their grief and trauma. In early 2013, McCann sent the teachers 68 copies of his book and drove up to Newtown to meet with students. From there, Newtown High School engaged in a story exchange with 180 students, as well as an exchange with students from Crane High School on the west side of Chicago. One of the teachers, Lee Keylock (who would go on to run curriculum development for the nonprofit), said that through the story exchange, “kids find out they have the same hopes and fears” no matter where they come from in the world.

McCann views the story exchange, and his writings, as a bastion of hope in a world full of cynicism. He told the Newton High School students that, "You have to beat the cynics at their own game," and has said that he would go "bare knuckle" to defend the notion of hope.

The bedrock of Narrative 4 is the story exchange. In this exercise, groups break off into pairs. In the pairs, each person tells the other person a story about themselves. Then they go back to the larger group and tell the other person's story in the first person, as if it had happened to them. McCann says that people often say they don't have a story to tell about themselves, but that's never the case—he believes everyone has a story to share. A litany of scientific studies have found that the story exchange increases empathy in its participants and encourages "prosocial actions".

Narrative 4 works in schools and communities around the world, encouraging young people to tell stories. McCann has said, "I've always wanted to do something beyond the words on the page. To use the writing to engage more on a ground level." Narrative 4 has offices both in New York and in Limerick, Ireland.

== Personal life ==
McCann has three children with his wife Allison.

On 16 June 2009, McCann published a Bloomsday remembrance in The New York Times of his long-deceased grandfather, whom he met only once, and of finding him again in the pages of James Joyce's Ulysses. McCann wrote, "The man whom I had met only once was becoming flesh and blood through the pages of a fiction."

McCann has written about his father, a journalist as well. In his essay "Looking for the Rozziner," first published in Granta magazine, McCann said, "It may have stretched towards parody—bygod the man could handle a shovel, just like his old man—but there was something acute about it, the desire to come home, to push the body in a different direction to the mind, the need to be tired alongside him in whatever small way, the emigrant's desire to root around in the old soil."

== Bibliography ==
=== Novels ===
- Songdogs, Phoenix, 1995. ISBN 9781897580288
- This Side of Brightness, Picador, 1998. ISBN 9780312421977
- Dancer, Picador Modern Classics, 2003. ISBN 9781250051790, OCLC 830020868
- Zoli, Random House, 2006. ISBN 9781400063727
- Let the Great World Spin, Random House, 2009. ISBN 9781408803226, OCLC 893296551
- TransAtlantic, Random House, 2013. ISBN 9781400069590, OCLC 852653036
- Apeirogon, Random House, 2020. ISBN 9781400069606
- Twist, Random House, 2025. ISBN 9798217070398

=== Short fiction ===
Collections

- Fishing the Sloe-black River. London: Phoenix House. 1993. ISBN 9780312423384. OCLC 54798875.
- Everything in this Country Must, Picador, 2000. ISBN 9780312273187
- Thirteen Ways of Looking. New York: Random House, 2015. ISBN 9780812996722, OCLC 966414193

Anthologies

- The Book of Men. Curated by Colum McCann and the editors of Esquire and Narrative 4 (2013)

Stories

Title	Publication	Collected in
"Tresses"	Sunday Tribune (1990)	-
"Sisters"	Analecta (1992)	Fishing the Sloe-Black River
"Through the Field"	The Picador Book of Contemporary Irish Fiction (1994)	Fishing the Sloe-Black River
"Breakfast for Enrique"	Fishing the Sloe-Black River (1994)	Fishing the Sloe-Black River
"A Basket Full of Wallpaper"	Fishing the Sloe-Black River (1994)	Fishing the Sloe-Black River
"Fishing the Sloe-Black River"	Fishing the Sloe-Black River (1994)	Fishing the Sloe-Black River
"Step We Gaily, On We Go"	Fishing the Sloe-Black River (1994)	Fishing the Sloe-Black River
"Stolen Child"	Fishing the Sloe-Black River (1994)	Fishing the Sloe-Black River
"From Many, One"	Fishing the Sloe-Black River (1994)	Fishing the Sloe-Black River
"Around the Bend and Back Again"	Fishing the Sloe-Black River (1994)	Fishing the Sloe-Black River
"Along the Riverwall"	Fishing the Sloe-Black River (1994)	Fishing the Sloe-Black River
"A Word in Edgewise"	Fishing the Sloe-Black River (1994)	Fishing the Sloe-Black River
"Cathal's Lake"	Fishing the Sloe-Black River (1994)	Fishing the Sloe-Black River
"As Kingfishers Catch Fire"	Story (Spring 1997)	-
"The First Snow"	Grand Street 63 (Winter 1998)	excerpt from This Side of Brightness
"Everything in This Country Must"	The Atlantic (July 1998)	Everything in This Country Must
"Hunger Strike"	GQ (November 1998)	Everything in This Country Must
"Sumac"	Story (Spring 1999)	-
"As If There Were Trees"	Story (Autumn 1999)	-
"Wood"	The New Yorker (November 29, 1999)	Everything in This Country Must
"All That Rises, All That Falls"	Esquire (December 2003)	-
"What Is It Called, Your Country, Behind the Mountain?"	Best New Irish Stories (2005)	-
"This Is the House That Horse Built"	Bomb 108 (Summer 2009)	excerpt from Let the Great World Spin
"Soldier's Field"	Esquire (October 2011)	-
"Transatlantic"	The New Yorker (April 6, 2012)	excerpt from Transatlantic
"What Time Is It Now, Where You Are?"	The Washington Post (November 17, 2013)	Thirteen Ways of Looking
"Sh'khol"	Zoetrope: All-Story (Fall 2014)	Thirteen Ways of Looking
"Treaty"	Esquire (August 2015)	Thirteen Ways of Looking
"Thirteen Ways of Looking"	Thirteen Ways of Looking (2015)	Thirteen Ways of Looking

=== Nonfiction ===
==== Book ====
- American Mother (co-written with Diane Foley), Etruscan Press, March 2024

==== Essay collections ====
- Letters to a Young Writer: Some Practical and Philosophical Advice. HarperCollins, 2017. ISBN 9780399590801.

==== Stories ====
- His Life Was Too Boring for a Memoir. So He Wrote Ireland's.". The New York Times (15 March 2022)
- Til' Human Voices Wake Us: What If This Virus Can Teach Us to Change Ourselves?". TIME (1 May 2022)
- No Rest For The Wired Alexander (13 April 2022)
- How to be hopeful: Colum McCann on the broken violin that played in a refugee camp" The Guardian (16 March 2019)
- The school without a skyline The Independent (23 July 2017)
- So you want to be a writer? Essential tips for aspiring novelists" The Guardian (13 May 2017)
- Irish Author Colum McCann Tackles a Bottle of Hibiki Japanese Harmony Whisky" The Wall Street Journal (28 September 2015)
- Inner Worlds: The Word Shed. The New Yorker (22-29 December 2014)
- "What baseball does to the soul". The New York Times (30 March 2012)
- "My ugly, lovely town - an essay by Colum McCann". The Stinging Fly (Winter 2011–12)
- "Dessert". The New Yorker (12 September 2011)
- "Looking for the Rozziner". Granta Magazine (2011)
- "The word made flesh". The American Scholar (1 December 2010)
- "But always meeting ourselves". The New York Times (15 June 2009)
- "No place like home". The New York Times. 31 December 2006.
