= The Parents Circle-Families Forum =

Grassroots organization for Palestinian and Israeli families

- Founded: 6 September 1995
- Founder: Yitzhak Frankenthal; Roni Hirshenzon
- Type: Non-profit; NGO
- Locations: Ramat Ef'al, Israel; Beit Jala, West Bank, Palestinian territories
- Region served: Israel; Palestinian territories
- Employees: 13
- Website: www.theparentscircle.org

The Parents Circle-Families Forum (PCFF; Hebrew: פורום המשפחות השכולות הישראלי-פלסטיני; Arabic: العائلات الثكلى الإسرائيلي الفلسطيني) is a grassroots organization of Palestinian and Israeli families who have lost immediate family members due to the Israeli–Palestinian conflict. The PCFF operates under the principle that a process of reconciliation is a prerequisite for achieving a sustained peace. The PCFF is also known as Israeli Palestinian Bereaved Families for Reconciliation and Peace and as Bereaved Families Supporting Peace, Reconciliation, and Tolerance.

PCFF was founded in 1995 by Yitzhak Frankenthal and several bereaved Israeli families. According to an article in The Guardian, PCFF had more than 500 members in 2009. The members conduct dialogue sessions, give lectures, and engage in projects to support dialogue and reconciliation.

The Parents Circle – Families Forum is a not-for-profit organization registered in Israel operating from two offices, one in Israel, and one in Beit Jala. Mazen Faraj and Nir Oren, a Palestinian and an Israeli, respectively, are the co-general managers of the PCFF.

== History ==
In July 1994, 19-year-old Israeli soldier Arik Frankenthal was kidnapped and killed by Hamas. To come to terms with the loss, Arik's father Yitzhak Frankenthal joined with several other bereaved families to found the Parent's Circle Families Forum in 1995.

In 1998, the group held its first meetings with Palestinian families in Gaza; however, this connection was severed as a result of the Second Intifada. In 2000, the PCFF was able to reestablish its connection with Palestinian families, incorporating families from the West Bank, including East Jerusalem.

== Activities ==
=== Regular activities ===
PCFF's most broad-reaching activity is its "Dialogue Encounters" program. Dialogue encounters allow a group of individuals to hear the personal narrative and message of reconciliation of one Palestinian and one Israeli. These messages aim to increase the willingness of participants to embrace dialogue as an alternative to violence, and to better understand the needs and perspectives of the 'other side'. One of the primary goals of this program is to allow Palestinians and Israelis to meet one another, which has been increasingly rare since the Second Intifada. For many participants, the Dialogue Encounter is their first time meeting a member of the other side.

Beginning in 2010, the PCFF began a Narrative Project which brings together groups of Israelis and Palestinians from similar disciplines who meet with one on a regular basis in order to forge mutual understanding and respect. They engage through a process called the 'Parallel Narrative Experience', which aims to help each side understand the personal and national narratives of the other. These groups have included grandmothers, social activists, physicians, students (two groups) mental health specialists, educators (two groups), artists, Film, "Wounded Crossing Borders", "One Voice", Israeli, Palestinian and Jordanian students from the Arava Institute, Palestinian and Israeli young political leaders, "Combatants for Peace", Media people, The groups engage in a series of uni-national and bi-national dialogue meetings and together visit the former Palestinian village of Lifta as well as the Yad Vashem Holocaust Museum. Artist Omer Golan stated his own experience in the group as "remarkable".

As part of the History Through the Human Eye Project, the PCFF has established The Reconciliation Center. This center has meetings aimed at promoting public debate, raising general awareness and increasing understanding about the reconciliation process and knowledge of the other. The center is open to the public and invites Israelis and Palestinians to participate in activities. Sessions at the Center include screening of films on the subject, discussions with professionals and guest lecturers from academia and Civil society and International Peace Day which takes place every year in September.[7] The center also includes a collection of books, articles, and films about the conflict and the reconciliation process in Arabic, Hebrew, and English. Many of these materials are accessible as online resources through the Reconciliation Center's website.

The PCFF also conducts an annual summer camp, held in August, for bereaved Palestinian and Israeli youth. The camp provides activities that build trust and understanding between the children. It serves about 50 children each year.

In 2002, the PCFF established the "Hello Shalom" phone hotline. This provided a toll free telephone line between Israelis and Palestinians to allow them to talk for free and make connections. The phone line garnered over 1,000,000 calls. Expanding on the success of the project, in 2010, the PCFF launched the "Crack in the Wall" Facebook group, which aims to use social media as a tool to increase connections between Israelis and Palestinians. The metaphoric 'wall' refers to both the separating wall built between the two countries, and the wall of hatred that exists between the two peoples. The stated goal of the project is to humanize the daily affairs of the conflict by allowing for conversation and engagement, to recruit participants from a broad swath of society rather than only activists, and to allow Israelis and Palestinians to work together to end the status quo.

Members of the Parent's Circle, Sharon Kalimi Misheiker and Aziz Abu Sarah, hosted the New Direction radio show on All for Peace Radio, which aired between 2005 and 2007. The show was based in Jerusalem and had about 25,000 listeners, split between Israel and Palestine. The show was hosted in both Hebrew and Arabic. In each hourlong program, the "New Direction" hosts interviewed a Palestinian and an Israeli from the forum about why they chose dialogue over revenge.

=== Special events ===
The PCFF set up a display of coffins draped in Israeli and Palestinian flags outside of the United Nations in New York in 2002.[11] In 2007, PCFF returned to the United Nations with the exhibit "Offering Reconciliation." 135 Palestinian and Israeli artists created their vision of reconciliation on identical ceramic plates. In 2009, PCFF presented an exhibit called "Cartooning in Conflict" of famous political cartoonists from around the world whose work touches on the Israeli/Palestinian conflict. The exhibit has been shown in Israel, New York, London, Italy and Spain.

Each day, the PCFF plans a special celebration for International Peace Day, held in September. In 2011, this included the Blood Relations Project, organized in conjunction with Saatchi and Saatchi as part of their Impossible Brief Competition. In this project, Israelis and Palestinians donated blood as 'the ultimate symbol of a healing of the conflict'. The slogan for the project was: "Could you hurt someone who has your blood running through their veins?"

=== Political activity ===
PCFF delegations have met with leaders such as the late Yassir Arafat[14] and Israeli President Shimon Peres. PCFF members have also met with Jordan's King Abdullah. In 2009, singer Leonard Cohen performed in Tel Aviv and dedicated his concert (and its proceeds) to peace groups, including PC-FF. The PCFF continues to meet with both Palestinian and Israeli political leaders to educate them on the importance of the reconciliation process in crafting political agreements.

With the help of USAID, the PCFF created the TV drama series Good Intentions. The show was a 10 chapter story focused on the lives and families of two women chefs, one Israeli and one Palestinian, and their attempt to create a cooking show for TV. The show was aired on prime time on Channel 2 Israeli Television and featured Israeli and Palestinian actors. The dialogue was in Hebrew and Arabic with subtitles for readers of both languages.

== Documentaries and films ==
The PCFF is included in Encounter Point (2006), which follows peace activists trying to work together in the Israeli-Palestinian conflict.

Another Side of Peace (2004) follows the story of co-founder Roni Hirshenzon as he explains what brought him to reconciliation work and talks to newly bereaved families.

Several other documentaries have been recently produced featuring PCFF members as main protagonists. After the Silence (2011) records the journey of Yael Armanet-Chernobroda as she meets with the family of the suicide bomber who was responsible for the death of her husband, Dov. One Day After Peace (2012) details the journey of PCFF member Robi Damelin as she explores the possibility of closure with the Palestinian responsible for the death of her son, David. Within the Eye of the Storm (2011) tells the story of Bassam Aramin and Rami Elhanan, both PCFF members, on their journey of reconciliation and understanding after the loss of their respective daughters.

In 2011, the PCFF produced a full-length documentary on a narrative group participating in the narrative project, entitled Two Sided Story. The documentary was directed by Emmy award winner Tor Ben Mayor, and follows a diverse group of 27 Palestinians and Israelis through their experience with the Narrative Project. The group included settlers, orthodox Jews, ex-prisoners, non-violent activists, holocaust survivors, religious Muslims, among others. It was produced jointly by an Israeli and a Palestinian film company, and has been aired throughout Israel, Europe, and the United States.

== Special recognition ==
The PCFF was referenced in President Obama's historic 2011 Middle East Speech. He was quoted as saying, "We see that spirit in the Israeli father whose son was killed by Hamas, who helped start an organization that brought together Israelis and Palestinians who had lost loved ones. That father said, 'I gradually realized that the only hope for progress was to recognize the face of the conflict.'"

The PCFF was invited by the Apostolic Delegation in Jerusalem to a meeting between Pope Benedict XVI and various institutions engaged in inter-religious dialogue and activities promoting mutual respect and understanding. In his speech to the group, he made mention of the presence of representatives of bereaved families among the groups gathered to engage in the dialogue: "Friends, the institutions and groups that you represent engage in inter-religious dialogue and the promotion of cultural initiatives at a wide range of levels. From academic institutions—and here I wish to make special mention of the outstanding achievements of Bethlehem University—to bereaved parents groups, from initiatives through music and the arts to the courageous example of ordinary mothers and fathers, from formal dialogue groups to charitable organizations, you daily demonstrate your belief that our duty before God is expressed not only in our worship but also in our love and concern for society, for culture, for our world and for all who live in this land."

== Awards and recognition ==
In 2011, Khaled Abu Awwad was awarded the UNESCO-Madanjeet Singh Prize for the Promotion of Tolerance and Non-Violence for "his efforts to promote tolerance, peace and non-violence through his work as a peace activist and leader in the reconciliation process between Palestinians and Israelis."

The Gwangju Prize for Human Rights 2011 in Korea. Given by the May 18 Memorial Foundation in Korea.

Crack in the Wall was given an Honorable Mention at the Intercultural Innovation Award, given by UNAOC and the BMW Group, February 26, 2013.

The International Solidarity Prize, 2010. Given by the International Social Cinema Film Festival of Castilla La Mancha in Toledo, Spain.

The Gold Medal of Merit for outstanding service in the field of international understanding and reconciliation. Given by the Seniors Union of Germany's Christian Democrat Union (CDU) and to be presented by Chancellor Angela Merkel in 2010.

The Gandhi Foundation International Peace Award for 2010.

The 2008 Martha Prize for tolerance and democratic values in Jerusalem by The Jerusalem Foundation, Jerusalem, Israel.

The Arab House and the Sefarad-Israel house jointly forwarded the candidacy of the PCFF for the Prince Asturias of Concord Award, 2009.

The Three Cultures award for Peace and Dialogue, 2009 Given by the Three Cultures Foundation of the Mediterranean Sea, Seville, Spain.

Search for Common Ground award for peace building in the Middle East, 2008. Given by Search for Common Ground, 11.14.2008, Canadian Embassy, Washington D.C.

Goldberg IIE Awards Prize to Members of Parents Circle Family Forum, 2008. Given by the Institute of International Education (IIE) and IIE's Executive Committee member and former vice chairman Victor J. Goldberg, The American Center in Jerusalem, Israel.

Solidar's Silver Rose Award in its "International category - Peace and Reconciliation", 2007. Given by Solidar, EP, Brussels, Belgium.

In 2025, the Nuremberg International Human Rights Award was given to PCFF for their continuous communication between Israelis and Palestinians, even in the hardest of times, thus encouraging others to break free from their own fears. In the award ceremony, PCFF were praised for their greatness and humanism; though having lost a beloved person, they would still see each other's grief, extend their hands and disrupt the friend-foe logic.

In 2026, Israeli peace activisit Sharon Dolev nominated the PCFF for the 2026 Nobel Peace Prize.

== Criticism ==
In 2011 Israeli minister of education Gideon Saar disallowed meetings set up by PC-FF within the school system for cases that involved the relatives of Palestinians he described as terrorists who had been killed in the conflict. The decision followed a complaint sent to the minister by the Legal Forum for the Land of Israel on behalf of a group of parents. Saar said, "The education system supports messages of peace, conciliation and dialogue, and promotes pluralistic discourse, but there is no room for comparison between terror victims and terrorists." Several schools protested against the new directive.
