= Let the Great World Spin =

2009 novel by Colum McCann

- First edition cover
- Author: Colum McCann
- Language: English
- Genre: Novel
- Publisher: Random House
- Publication date: 23 June 2009
- Publication place: United States
- Media type: Print (hardback)
- Pages: 368
- ISBN: 978-1-4000-6373-4

Let the Great World Spin is a novel by Colum McCann set mainly in New York City in the United States. The book won the 2009 U.S. National Book Award for Fiction and the 2011 International Dublin Literary Award, one of the most lucrative literary prizes in the world. Its title comes from the poem "Locksley Hall" by Alfred, Lord Tennyson.

== Plot ==
The events of the story are told in a largely non-linear fashion, with several different narrators telling the story from different perspectives. The story is interspersed with fictionalized accounts of Philippe Petit's 1974 tightrope walk across the Twin Towers, the date on which the two main events of the novel occur: a fatal car crash and a trial.

In 1974, an Irishman named Ciaran travels to New York City to see his younger brother, Corrigan, a devout Jesuit monk who has moved to the projects of the Bronx. Corrigan works at a nursing home and has befriended several of the prostitutes working around his apartment, leaving his door unlocked so they can use his bathroom despite the danger this frequently puts him in. Ciaran meets two of the prostitutes, Tillie and her daughter Jazzlyn, who has two young children of her own. After Ciaran notices bruises on the inside of Corrigan's arm, he begins to suspect that he is using drugs. When he confronts him about this, Corrigan reveals that he is not using drugs but is in reality suffering from TTP. This was brought to his attention by Adelita, a nurse he met at the nursing home and has fallen in love with. This comes into direct conflict with the vows of chastity he took as a teenager and his sworn devotion to God, and he struggles to reconcile these beliefs with his love for Adelita.

Several months after Ciaran initially arrives in New York City, there is an incident in which many of the prostitutes are arrested, and Tillie and Jazzlyn are held in jail over an outstanding warrant for robbery. During the arrest, Jazzlyn drops a keychain with photos of her two children, which Corrigan picks up, intending to return it. The following day - 7 August 1974, the day of Philipe Petit's tightrope walk - Corrigan asks Ciaran to take over his shift at the nursing home for the day while he goes to pick up Jazzlyn from court after her acquittal. Ciaran agrees, and discusses his brother with Adelita, eventually coming to the conclusion that they have the right to be happy together for the time being no matter how their relationship will end. At the very moment Ciaran is coming to this conclusion, Corrigan's van is hit by a gold car on the FDR Drive, causing a massive car crash. Jazzlyn is killed instantly, and Corrigan is left so badly injured that the paramedics initially believe him to be dead. Lara, the passenger in the gold car, pleads with her husband Blaine, who was driving, to stop and accept responsibility, but loses her nerve when she hears sirens approaching and the two leave the scene of the crash. Meanwhile, Corrigan is rushed to a hospital and survives long enough for Adelita and Ciaran to make it to his bedside, where he tells Adelita that he had "seen something beautiful" before he finally dies.

The same day, Claire, a woman from a very wealthy southern family who lives on the Upper East Side, hosts a gathering for a group of mothers who have lost children in the Vietnam war. On the way to Claire's apartment, one of the women saw the tightrope walker and was shaken due to the fact that it reminded her of her son, expressing the belief that it was her son coming back to see her. Claire is greatly upset by this but cannot figure out why, eventually realizing that she resents the idea that someone would be so flippant about their own personal safety, showing so little disregard for their life when their sons were forced to give up their own without a choice. She tells the group the story of how she learned her son, Joshua, had been killed; Joshua had been drafted into Vietnam and worked as a computer programmer, writing code that would allow the computers to automatically tally American casualties. Unlike most of the other women's children, Joshua was not in active combat, but instead died when a grenade was detonated at the coffee shop he was inside. She reveals that she didn't know how to react to the officer who came to inform them of their son's death and instead just smiled and thanked him, unable to do anything else. After telling the story, she realizes that there is nothing they can do but rely on each other to heal, and decides to let go of her anger towards the tightrope walking man and instead focus on the memory of her son. As the women leave Claire's apartment, Claire pleads with Gloria - a black woman who is Claire's favorite of the group - to stay; Gloria considers staying, but decides to leave, as "we didn’t go freedom-riding years ago to clean apartments on Park Avenue". Before she departs, Claire tells Gloria that she would be happy to pay her, startling both women and causing Gloria to leave the building hastily. However, she is robbed of her purse - containing photographs of her sons - on the way home, and hails a cab back to Claire's apartment, where Claire apologizes profusely for what she said despite Gloria insisting that it doesn't matter. After several hours of talking, Claire's husband, Solomon, a judge, returns home, and tells them that he had presided over the case of the man on the tightrope and charged him a dollar and ten cents - one penny per floor - as well as another performance. Claire then takes Gloria home in a taxi; when they reach their destination, they see two young children being led away by a social worker. Gloria tells the social worker that she knows them and ends up raising the children, who are revealed to be Jazzlyn's daughters, Janice and another girl, also named Jazzlyn.

The following day, Lara, the passenger in the gold car, continues to feel tremendous guilt over Jazzlyn's death. The year before, she and Blaine - both of whom are artists - had decided that they would stop using drugs and drinking and moved to a secluded cabin in upstate New York; however, the night before the crash, they indulged in a night of partying and had intended to return to the cabin and detox the following day, when they drove back home, still high on cocaine. After a fight with Blaine, who insists that they were not responsible, she returns to the city and checks the hospitals to find out what happened to Corrigan, eventually learning that he died. She tells the hospital staff she is his cousin and collects his belongings, among which is Jazzlyn's keychain, which she assumes to be a photo of Corrigan's children. She drives to the address on Corrigan's license and enters his apartment, where she finds Adelita and Ciaran, cleaning up the apartment. She returns Corrigan's belongings to his brother, and asks if she can accompany them to Jazzlyn's funeral.

At the funeral, Tillie is escorted by two cops and still in handcuffs, which they reluctantly remove to allow her to see her daughter's body. Afterwards, Tillie is taken back to jail and Lara offers Ciaran a ride home. Ciaran accepts, but immediately recognizes her car as the one involved in the crash, and angrily asks her why she didn't stop when Lara lies and tells him she was driving. The two eventually end up going out to a bar, where Ciaran tells her about his brother. As Tillie begins serving her eight-month sentence, it is revealed that her and Jazzlyn's case - presided over by Solomon, Claire's husband - had been decided by a deal struck between her and the detective: if Tillie pleaded guilty, he would give her six months and allow Jazzlyn to go free. While in prison, Tillie reflects on her life and the guilt she has over the life that Jazzlyn ended up living, considering the plea deal she took as the final time she failed her daughter that resulted in her death. While she is in prison, she is visited several times by Lara, who brings her books of Rumi's poetry (at Ciaran's suggestion) and assures her that her granddaughters are doing fine. Tillie comes up with a plan to commit suicide, and eventually executes it, dying in prison with the wish of seeing her daughter again. Before she dies, she is visited by Gloria with Jazzlyn's children, and decides that it is better that she not be involved in their lives, as she believes she is the reason that Jazzlyn's life ended the way that it did.

In 2006, 32 years after the main events of the book, Jazzlyn's daughter, Jazzlyn - who has changed her name to Jaslyn - returns to New York City to see Claire, who has suffered a debilitating stroke. In the airport, Jaslyn encounters Pino, a doctor who makes a joke in the security line and is detained by security, and they have sex. It is revealed that Ciaran and Lara ended up getting married, although Jaslyn did not know them very well while growing up. The book ends with Jaslyn visiting Claire, whose stroke has rendered her mostly incapacitated, as she reflects on the nature of life.

== Approach ==
The novel is written in a non-linear fashion, narrated by several of the eleven different protagonists. The lives of the characters are slowly woven together and revealed to be connected, despite the fact that some are not aware of this and have never even met. As most of the story unfolds over the course of several days, many events, such as the car crash and the trial, are retold from different perspectives by different narrators.

== Themes ==
Throughout the book, the author weaves the stories of each of the protagonists through the central events of the story, exploring the personal impact that these events had on the lives on each individual character. Despite the fact that many of the protagonists have never met and are from completely different worlds, they are all affected by the same occurrences; in subsequent interviews, the author has noted his intention to point out the melodramatic tensions present in all of our lives, whether perched upon a death-defying high wire, or merely trying to live out a more "ordinary" life, "where there is still an invisible tight-rope wire that we all walk, with equally high stakes, only it is hidden to most, and only 1 inch off the ground".

== Reception ==
The New York Times reviewer Jonathan Mahler ranked this book as, "One of the most electric, profound novels I have read in years."

The novel received numerous honours including the U.S. National Book Award. It was named winner of the 2011 International Dublin Literary Award in June 2011. The judging panel, among whom were John Boyne and Michael Hofmann, described the book as a "remarkable literary work [...] a genuinely 21st century novel that speaks to its time but is not enslaved by it", noting the book's opening pages in which "the people of New York city stand breathless and overwhelmed as a great artist dazzles them in a realm that seemed impossible until that moment; Colum McCann does the same thing in this novel, leaving the reader just as stunned as the New Yorkers, just as moved and just as grateful". Lord Mayor of Dublin Gerry Breen said it was "wonderful and fitting to have a Dublin winner in the year that Dublin was awarded UNESCO City of Literature designation, a designation in perpetuity".

In 2009, Let the Great World Spin was named Amazon.com's "Book of the Year." In 2025, Amazon named Let The Great World Spin one of the best books of the past 25 years.

== Album with Joe Hurley ==
Colum McCann and musician Joe Hurley cowrote a song-cycle—"The House That Horse Built (Let the Great World Spin)"—based on McCann's novel. The album is narrated from the perspective of the character Tillie. It was recorded with Hurley's band The Gents—James Mastro (Ian Hunter), Tony Shanahan (Patti Smith), and Ken Margolis (Cracker)—and features The Chieftains' Paddy Moloney, Matt Sweeney, soul singer Tami Lynn, film actress Antonique Smith, Denis Diken and Joe McGinty. It was produced by Don Fleming and Hurley.
