= Avraham Katznelson =

Israeli physician and politician (1888–1956)

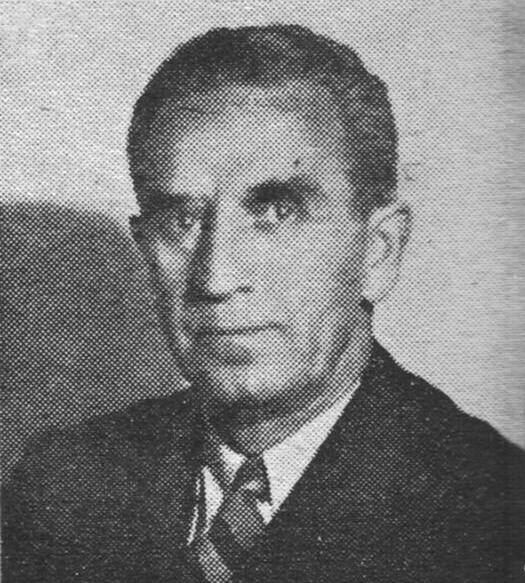
- Katznelson in 1946

Member of the Provisional State Council
- In office 1948–1949

Personal details
- Born: 1888 Bobruisk, Russian Empire
- Died: 18 May 1956 (aged 67–68)
- Party: Mapai

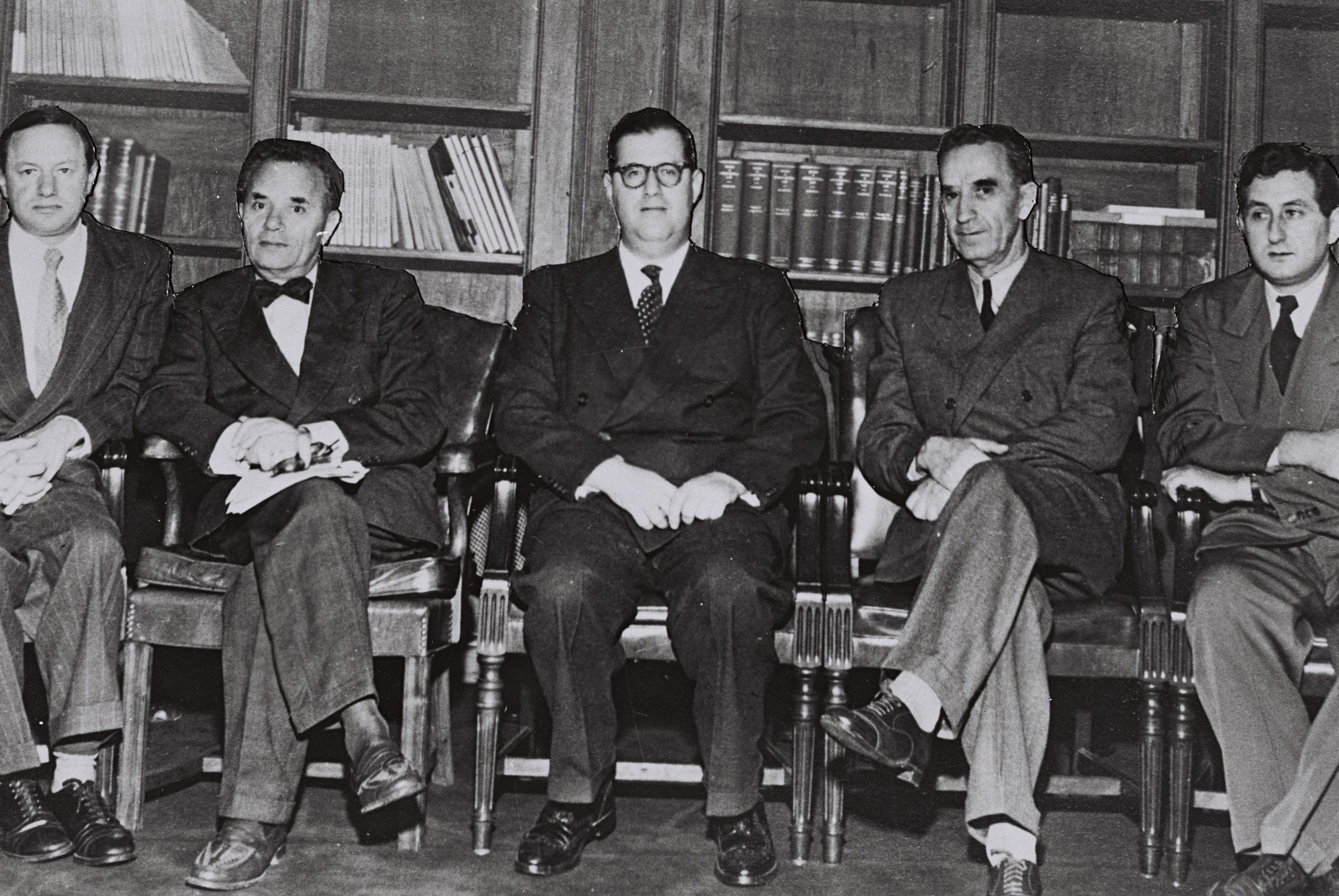
The Israeli delegation to the United Nations in 1950; from right: Gideon Rafael (Ministry of Foreign Affairs), Avraham Katznelson (Ministry of Health), Abba Eban, Jacob Robinson (lawyer) and Arthur Lourie (Israeli Consul in New York and Deputy Head of Delegation)

Avraham Katznelson (Hebrew: אברהם קצנלסון; 1888 – 18 May 1956), later known as Avraham Nissan, was a physician and Zionist political figure in Mandate Palestine. He was a signatory of the Israeli Declaration of Independence.

== Biography ==
Katznelson was born in Bobruisk in the Russian Empire (now in Belarus) to Nissan HaCohen and Zelda Helena (née Rozovsky). He was the brother of Yosef, Reuven (father of Justice Minister Shmuel Tamir), Shmuel and Rachel Katznelson (the wife of president Zalman Shazar). He studied in a heder and gymnasium and later attended the Jewish Studies Academy in Saint Petersburg as well as Saint Petersburg University and Moscow University. He also studied at the Academy of Social Hygiene in Berlin. In 1912 he earned a doctorate in Natural Sciences and in 1914 he qualified as a physician. During World War I he served as a military doctor in the Imperial Russian Army.

From 1912 he was a member of the Zionist Executive. Between 1919 and 1920 he managed the Palestine Office in Constantinople, assisting immigrants making their way to Palestine during the Third Aliyah.

Katznelson was a member of the main office of the Hapoel Hatzair–Young Zionists federation in Berlin and Vienna from 1921 to 1924. He led the party alongside Eliezer Kaplan and Haim Arlosoroff. In 1924, he emigrated to Mandatory Palestine and became the first director of the federation's office in the territory.

He served as head of the Health Department of the Jewish Agency (1924–1930) and was a member of the management of the National Council as the head of its health department (1931–1948). He was also a member of the League for the Fight Against Tuberculosis. Katznelson was a member of the Second, Third and Fourth elected Assembly of Representatives representing Hapoel Hatzair and later Mapai. He held additional public positions, such as being on the Technion's executive committee and the Palestine Broadcasting Service's advisory council during the Mandate era. As a member of the Zionist Executive, he served as the secretary of the health committee. In February 1932, he was elected to the Jerusalem Community Council on behalf of Mapai.

During the 1948 Arab–Israeli War Katznelson was one of the founders of the "Medical Service" (19 December 1947) alongside Moshe Feller, Yosef Meir, Mishulam Levontin and Moshe Kreiger. David Ben-Gurion noted in his diary after meeting with the establishment team:

"An emergency medical committee has been formed, and regional doctors have been appointed. It was decided to add 500 beds to the existing hospitals, with reserve personnel (especially surgery teams). Equipment costing 76,600 IL is required – beds, operating tables, and additional beds."

Katznelson was a member of the Provisional State Council due to his role in the leadership of the National Council, and was among the signatories of the Israeli Declaration of Independence. From the establishment of the state until March 1949 he served as the Director-General of the Ministry of Health. In 1949 he joined Israel's delegation to the United Nations, where he participated in discussions regarding the convention for the prevention of prostitution, expressing opposition to government regulation of prostitution.

Afterwards, Katznelson joined the Ministry of Foreign Affairs. From November 1950 he served for five years as Israel's Minister Plenipotentiary to Scandinavia, based in Stockholm. In early 1956 he returned from his post due to illness and died a few weeks later.

== Personal life ==
From 1919 he was married to Sima, daughter of Ze'ev Kaplan, who was also a physician. He was the father of Shmuel (a doctor, professor and a pioneer in paediatric surgery in Israel) and Ze'evah (Zika), the wife of Matti Peled. Ze'evah was named after her maternal grandfather.

== Commemoration ==
His memory is commemorated with a street named "Avraham Nissan" in the Kiryat Yovel neighborhood in Jerusalem.
