= 2020 Polish Film Awards =

22nd Polish Film Awards
- Date: 2 March 2020
- Site: Polish Theatre, Warsaw, Poland
- Hosted by: Maciej Stuhr

Highlights
- Best Film: Corpus Christi
- Most awards: Corpus Christi (11)
- Most nominations: Corpus Christi (15)

Television coverage
- Network: Canal+

The 22nd Polish Film Awards took place on 2 March 2020 at the Polish Theatre in Warsaw, Poland. The ceremony honored the best in Polish cinema of 2019, presented by the Polish Film Academy. The ceremony was hosted by comedian Maciej Stuhr.

Corpus Christi won eleven awards at the ceremony, including Best Film. Other winners included Icarus: The Legend of Mietek Kosz and Mister T. with two awards each, and The Coldest Game, The Favourite, Sword of God, Tell No One, and Wataha with one.

== Winners and nominees ==
The nominations were announced on 5 February 2020. Winners are listed first, highlighted in boldface, and indicated with a double dagger (‡).

**Best Film**: **Corpus Christi – Jan Komasa**‡; Icarus: The Legend of Mietek Kosz – Maciej Pieprzyca; Mister T. – Marcin Krzyształowicz; Mr Jones – Agnieszka Holland; Supernova – Bartosz Kruhlik	**Best European Film**: **(Republic of Ireland) (United Kingdom) (United States) The Favourite – Yorgos Lanthimos**‡; (Russia) Beanpole – Kantemir Balagov; (North Macedonia) Honeyland – Tamara Kotevska and Ljubomir Stefanov; (France) (Italy) An Officer and a Spy – Roman Polanski; (Spain) Pain and Glory – Pedro Almodóvar
**Best TV Series**: **Wataha (season 3) – Kasia Adamik and Olga Chajdas**‡; Chyłka. Kasacja – Łukasz Palkowski and Marek Wróbel; Chyłka. Zaginięcie – Łukasz Palkowski; Odwróceni. Ojcowie i córki – Michał Gazda and Jan Holoubek; Żmijowisko – Łukasz Palkowski	**Best Director**: **Jan Komasa – Corpus Christi**‡; Agnieszka Holland – Mr Jones; Bartosz Kruhlik – Supernova; Marcin Krzyształowicz – Mister T.; Maciej Pieprzyca – Icarus: The Legend of Mietek Kosz
**Best Actor**: **Bartosz Bielenia – Corpus Christi as Daniel**‡; Jacek Braciak – A Coach's Daughter as Maciej Kornet; Dawid Ogrodnik – Icarus: The Legend of Mietek Kosz as Mieczysław Kosz; Borys Szyc – Piłsudski as Józef Piłsudski; Paweł Wilczak – Mister T. as Mister T.	**Best Actress**: **Aleksandra Konieczna – Corpus Christi as Lidia**‡; Krystyna Janda – Dolce Fine Giornata as Maria Linde; Dorota Kolak – Playing Hard as Teresa; Agata Kulesza – Playing Hard as Dorota; Maria Sobocińska – Mister T. as maturzystka Dagna
**Best Supporting Actor**: **Łukasz Simlat – Corpus Christi as Father Tomasz**‡; **Robert Więckiewicz – The Coldest Game as Alfred**‡; Andrzej Chyra – Bird Talk as Lucjan; Sebastian Stankiewicz – Mister T. as Filak; Tomasz Ziętek – Corpus Christi as Pinczer	**Best Supporting Actress**: **Eliza Rycembel – Corpus Christi as Eliza**‡; Jowita Budnik – Icarus: The Legend of Mietek Kosz as Mietka's mother; Agata Buzek – A Coach's Daughter as Kamila; Katarzyna Smutniak – Dolce Fine Giornata as Anna; Marta Żmuda Trzebiatowska – Bird Talk as Jakubcowa
**Best Screenplay**: **Corpus Christi – Mateusz Pacewicz**‡; Bird Talk – Andrzej Żuławski; Icarus: The Legend of Mietek Kosz – Maciej Pieprzyca; Mister T. – Marcin Krzyształowicz and Andrzej Gołda; Mr Jones – Andrea Chalupa	**Best Cinematography**: **Corpus Christi – Piotr Sobociński Jr.**‡; Bird Talk – Andrzej J. Jaroszewicz; The Coldest Game – Paweł Edelman; Mister T. – Adam Bajerski; Mr Jones – Tomasz Naumiuk
**Best Production Design**: **Mister T. – Magdalena Dipont and Robert Czesak**‡; The Coldest Game – Allan Starski; Corpus Christi – Marek Zawierucha; Icarus: The Legend of Mietek Kosz – Joanna Anastazja Wójcik; Mr Jones – Grzegorz Piątkowski and Katarzyna Sikora	**Best Makeup and Hairstyling**: **Sword of God – Dariusz Krysiak**‡; Black Mercedes – Aneta Brzozowska and Monika Jan-Łechtańska; The Coldest Game – Agnieszka Hodowana and Ewa Drobiec; How I Became a Gangster – Karolina Kordas; The Legions – Anna Dąbrowska; The Messenger – Janusz Kaleja; Mr Jones – Janusz Kaleja; Mister T. – Dominika Dylewska; Piłsudski – Dariusz Krysiak, Mirosława Wojtczak, and Waldemar Pokromski; Werewolf – Dariusz Krysiak
**Best Costume Design**: **Mister T. – Magdalena Biedrzycka**‡; Bird Talk – Anna Englert; The Coldest Game – Ewa Gronowska; Corpus Christi – Dorota Roqueplo; Icarus: The Legend of Mietek Kosz – Agata Culak; The Messenger – Małgorzata Braszka and Michał Koralewski; Mr Jones – Aleksandra Staszko	**Best Film Score**: **Icarus: The Legend of Mietek Kosz – Leszek Możdżer**‡; Bird Talk – Andrzej Korzyński; Corpus Christi – Evgueni and Sacha Galperine; A Hole in the Head – Paweł Szymański; Servants of War – Maciej Zieliński
**Best Sound**: **Icarus: The Legend of Mietek Kosz – Maciej Pawłowski and Robert Czyżewicz**‡; The Coldest Game – Jarosław Bajdowski, Michał Fojcik, and Bartłomiej Bogacki; Corpus Christi – Tomasz Wieczorek, Kacper Habisiak, and Marcin Kasiński; The Messenger – Bartłomiej Bogacki, Kacper Habisiak, and Marcin Kasiński; Mister T. – Piotr Domaradzki and Barbara Domaradzka	**Best Editing**: **Corpus Christi – Przemysław Chruścielewski**‡; Icarus: The Legend of Mietek Kosz – Piotr Kmiecik; Mr Jones – Michał Czarnecki; Mister T. – Wojciech Mrówczyński; Sword of God – Andrzej Dąbrowski; Werewolf – Jarosław Kamiński
**Best Documentary**: **Tell No One – Tomasz Sekielski**‡; Compulsory Figures – Ewa Kochańska; Concerto for Two – Tomasz Drozdowicz; Diagnosis – Ewa Podgórska; In Touch – Paweł Ziemilski; Love and Empty Words – Małgorzata Imielska; Marek Edelman... and There Was Love in the Ghetto – Jolanta Dylewska; Symphony of the Ursus Factory – Jaśmina Wójcik; The Wind: A Documentary Thriller – Michał Bielawski	**Discovery of the Year**: **Mateusz Pacewicz – Corpus Christi (Screenplay)**‡; Cyprian Grabowski – Icarus: The Legend of Mietek Kosz (Acting); Łukasz Kośmicki – The Coldest Game (Directing); Bartosz Kruhlik – Supernova (Directing); Bartosz Kruhlik – Supernova (Screenplay)
**Audience Award**: **Corpus Christi**	**Life Achievement Award**: **Maja Komorowska**
**Special Eagle Award for Outstanding Contribution to Polish Cinema**: **Polish Film Institute**; **Canal+ Poland**

== Films with multiple awards and nominations ==
Films with multiple nominations
Nominations	Film
15	Corpus Christi
12	Mister T.
11	Icarus: The Legend of Mietek Kosz
8	Mr Jones
7	The Coldest Game
6	Bird Talk
4	Supernova
3	The Messenger
2	A Coach's Daughter
2	Dolce Fine Giornata
2	Piłsudski
2	Playing Hard
2	Sword of God
2	Werewolf

Films with multiple wins
Wins	Film
11	Corpus Christi
2	Icarus: The Legend of Mietek Kosz
2	Mister T.
