= Beksiński =

Beksiński is a Polish surname. Notable people with the surname include:

- Tomasz Beksiński (1958–1999), Polish radio presenter, music journalist and movie translator
- Zdzisław Beksiński (1929–2005), Polish painter, photographer and sculptor, Tomasz's father

== Other meanings ==
- Beksiński. Wizje życia i śmierci, a 2021 book about Zdzisław Beksiński
