= Polish Academy Award for Best Documentary =

Annual Polish film award

The Polish Academy Award for Best Documentary has been awarded annually since 2013 by the Polish Film Academy. It is given to director of the picture.

== Winners and nominees ==
Year	Polish title	Director	About
2013	Wirtualna wojna	Jacek Bławut	international community of people fascinated with computer games
2013	Fabryka wódki	Jerzy Śladkowski	story of Valentina Barabina, who works in vodka factory in Moscow
2013	Fuck for Forest	Michał Marczak	Fuck for Forest group
2014	Inny świat	Dorota Kędzierzawska	Danuta Szaflarska's experiences and memories
2014	Miłość	Filip Dzierżawski	history of Polish free jazz band Miłość
2014	Ojciec i syn	Piotr Łoziński	relations of Piotr Łoziński and his son Marcel
2015	Powstanie Warszawskie	Jan Komasa	Warsaw Uprising
2015	Efekt domina	Elwira Niewiera Piotr Rosołowski	life of Rafael and Natasha in Abkhazia
2015	Sen o Warszawie	Krzysztof Magowski	life of Czesław Niemen
2016	Aktorka	Kinga Dębska Maria Konwicka	life of Elżbieta Czyżewska
2016	Karski i władcy ludzkości	Slawomir Grünberg	life of Jan Karski
2016	Piano	Vita Drygas	Euromaidan
2016	Nadejdą lepsze czasy	Hanna Polak	life of Julia, who lives in landfill near Moscow
2016	Joanna	Aneta Kopacz	life of Joanna who has deadly disease
2017	Communion	Anna Zamecka	life of Ola who takes care of her dysfunctional family
2017	Bracia	Wojciech Staroń	
2017	Mów mi Marianna	Karolina Bielawska	
2018	21 x Nowy Jork	Piotr Stasik	the portrayal of New York City through observation of the metro passengers
2018	Beksińscy. Album Wideofoniczny	Marcin Borchardt	the Beksiński family
2018	Młynarski. Piosenka finałowa	Alicja Albrecht	life of Wojciech Młynarski
2019	Książe i dybuk	Elwira Niewiera, Piotr Rosołowski	film journey to places connected with Michał Waszyński
2019	Opera o Polsce	Piotr Stasik	
2019	Over the Limit	Marta Prus	
2020	Tell No One	Tomasz Sekielski	child sexual abuse in the Catholic Church in Poland
2021	Wieloryb z Lorino	Maciej Cuske	story of two disappearing worlds: community of the Chukchi people and majestic whales
2022	Film balkonowy	Paweł Łoziński	stories of passers-by whom the film's author observes from his balcony
2022	1970	Tomasz Wolski	
2022	Polański. Horowitz. Hometown	Mateusz Kudła	journey of Roman Polański and Ryszard Horowitz to their hometown of Kraków
2022	Sędziowie pod presją	Kacper Lisowski	
2022	Ucieczka na srebrny glob	Kuba Mikurda	
2023	Lombard	Łukasz Kowalski	
2023	Anioły z Sindżaru	Hanna Polak	
2023	Pisklaki	Lidia Duda	
2023	Silent Love	Marek Kozakiewicz	
2023	Syndrom Hamleta	Elwira Niewiera and Piotr Rosołowski	
2024	Pianoforte	Jakub Piątek	
2024	Apolonia, Apolonia	Lea Glob	
2024	Faces of Agata	Małgorzata Kozera	
2024	In the Rearview	Maciek Hamela	
2024	Vika!	Agnieszka Zwiefka	
2025	Wanda Rutkiewicz. Ostatnia wyprawa	Eliza Kubarska	
2025	Las	Lidia Duda	
2025	Gdy powieje harmattan	Edyta Wróblewska	
2025	Drzewa milczą	Agnieszka Zwiefka	
2025	8. dzień Chamsinu	Zvika Gregory Portnoy	
