= Aleksandra Konieczna =

Polish actress (born 1965)

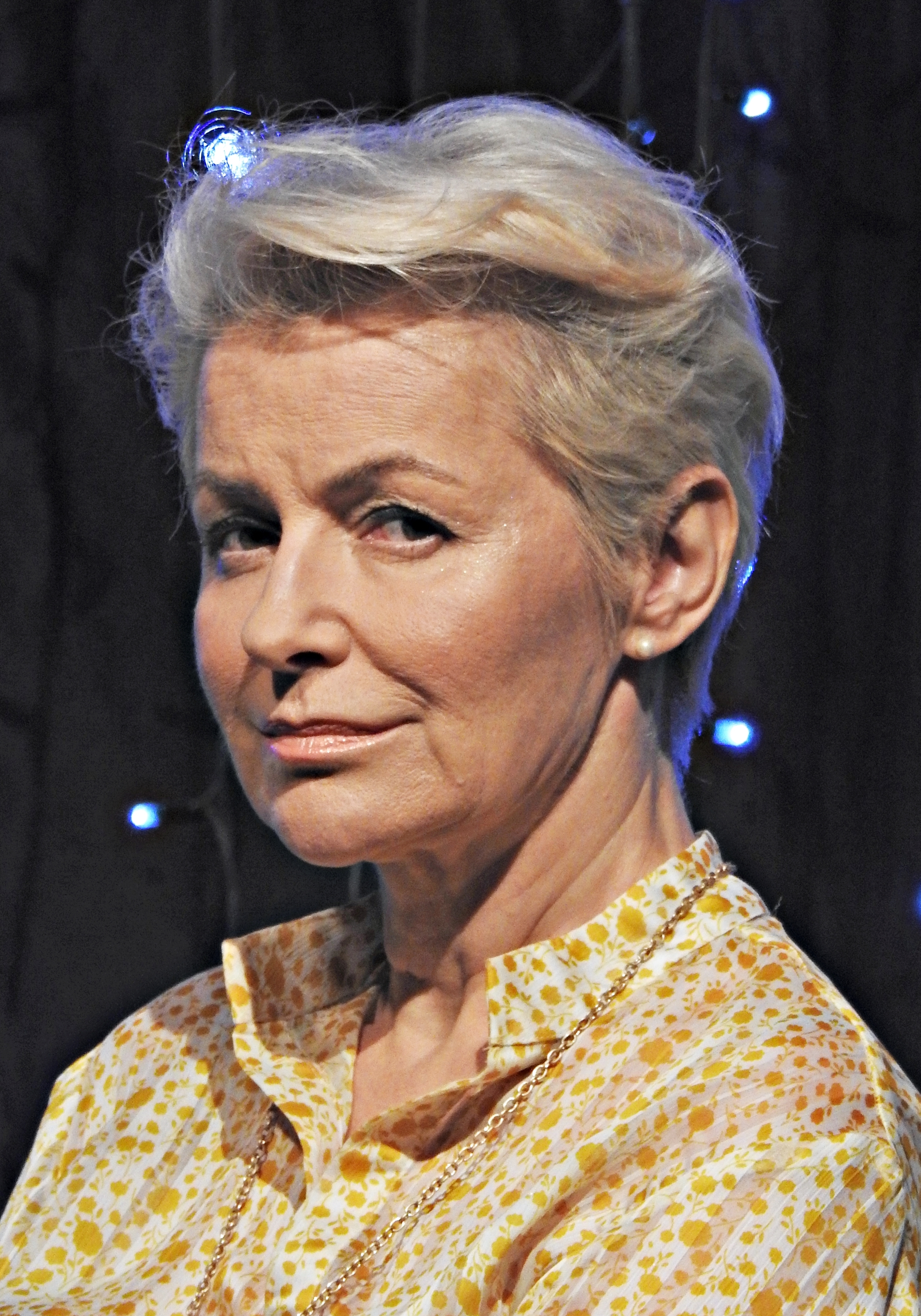
- Konieczna in 2019
- Born: Aleksandra Konieczna; 13 October 1965 (age 60); Prudnik, Poland
- Education: Aleksander Zelwerowicz National Academy of Dramatic Art in Warsaw
- Occupation: Actor
- Years active: 1986–present
- Spouse: Andrzej Maj
- Children: 1

Aleksandra Konieczna (born 13 October 1965) is a Polish film and stage actress. She is a three-time Polish Film Award winner for her roles in The Last Family (2016), A Cat with a Dog (2018) and Corpus Christi (2019). Her television credits include Na Wspólnej (2008–present), Diagnosis (2017–2018) and Belfer (2017).

== Biography ==
She graduated from the Adam Mickiewicz High School No. 1 in Prudnik. In 1988, she graduated from the Aleksander Zelwerowicz National Academy of Dramatic Art in Warsaw.

She performed on stage at Warsaw Teatr Współczesny (Modern Theatre; 1988–1990), Warsaw Dramatic Theatre (1990–2000), and later at Warsaw Variety Theatre. In 2000, she received a Polish Radio Festival Award for her role in the radio play Dorra directed by Andrzej Piszczatowski. In 2006, she received an acting award at the Polish Radio and Polish Television Theatre Festival "Two Theatres" in Sopot for her role in the television play Skaza directed by Marcin Wrona, based on the Marzena Broda's drama of the same name.

Her role as Honorata in the soap opera Na Wspólnej (since 2008) brought her popularity. For the role of Zofia Beksińska in the film The Last Family (2016) she was awarded the Polish Academy Award for Best Actress and an award for leading female role at the 41st Gdynia Film Festival. She played Dr Maria Kaleta in the television series Diagnosis between 2017 and 2018. In 2017, she won the Grand Prix of the "Two Theatres" festival for her role in the television play Clean Up.

In 2018, she played Polish actress and singer Iga Cembrzyńska in Janusz Kondratiuk's autobiographical film A Cat with a Dog, which depicts the director's last year spent together with his brother Andrzej (Iga's husband) before his death. For her performance, Konieczna was awarded Polish Academy Award for Best Supporting Actress and the award for supporting female role at the 43rd Gdynia Film Festival. She then played Lidia in Jan Komasa's Academy Award-nominated film Corpus Christi (2019) which earned Koniczna her second Polish Academy Award for Best Actress. She received her second Gdynia Film Festival award for best supporting actress for her role in Sweat (2020).

== Filmography ==
=== Film ===
Year	Title	Role	Director
1986	Maskarada	Girl	Janusz Kijowski
1988	Spadek	Ryfka	Mirosław Gronowski
1991	Life for Life: Maximilian Kolbe	Zofia Banasikówna	Krzysztof Zanussi
1999	Operacja Koza	Gynecologist	Olaf Lubaszenko
2009	Generał Nil	Stanisława Wierzbicka-Hryckowian	Ryszard Bugajski
2013	In the Name Of	Adam's sister	Małgorzata Szumowska
2016	The Last Family	Zofia Beksińska	Jan P. Matuszyński
2018	Jak pies z kotem	Iga Cembrzyńska	Janusz Kondratiuk
2019	Corpus Christi	Lidia	Jan Komasa
2020	Sweat	Basia	Magnus von Horn
2021	Leave No Traces	Wiesława Bardon	Jan P. Matuszyński

=== Television ===
Year	Title	Role	Notes
2008–present	Na Wspólnej	Honorata Hoffer	Soap opera, main cast
2017–2018	Diagnosis	Maria Kaleta	Main cast
2020	The Elements of Sasza – Fire	Marta Gajka	
