= The Last Family =

- Directed by: Jan P. Matuszyński
- Written by: Robert Bolesto
- Produced by: Leszek Bodzak; Aneta Cebula-Hickinbotham
- Starring: Andrzej Seweryn; Dawid Ogrodnik; Aleksandra Konieczna; Andrzej Chyra
- Cinematography: Kacper Fertacz
- Edited by: Przemysław Chruścielewski
- Production company: Aurum Film
- Release date: 30 September 2016
- Running time: 123 minutes
- Country: Poland
- Language: Polish
- Box office: $2,284,311

The Last Family (Polish: Ostatnia rodzina) is a 2016 Polish biographical film directed by Jan P. Matuszyński. The film won the Golden Lions for best film at the 2016 Gdynia Film Festival.

== Plot ==
As renowned painter Zdzislaw Beksinski tapes everything with his camcorder, a 28-year family saga unfolds through his disturbing dystopian paintings, family feuds, near-death experiences, love-hate relations and consecutive funerals. The true story of the artistic Beksinski family: Zdzislaw, his wife Zofia and their talented yet trouble-making son Tomasz.

== Cast ==
- Andrzej Seweryn - Zdzislaw Beksinski
- Dawid Ogrodnik - Tomasz Beksinski
- Aleksandra Konieczna - Zofia Beksinska
- Andrzej Chyra - Piotr Dmochowski
- Zofia Perczynska - Stanislawa Beksinska
- Danuta Nagórna - Stanislawa Stankiewicz
- Alicja Karluk - Patrycja
- Magdalena Boczarska - Ewa
- Agnieszka Michalska - Helena

== Reception ==
On Rotten Tomatoes, the film has an aggregate score of 75% based on 6 positive and 2 negative critic reviews. The British newspaper The Guardian gave The Last Family 4 out of 5 stars, praising its inventive camerawork and film editing.

== See also ==
- Beksiński. Wizje życia i śmierci, a 2021 book about Beksiński
