= Dawid Ogrodnik =

Polish actor (born 1986)

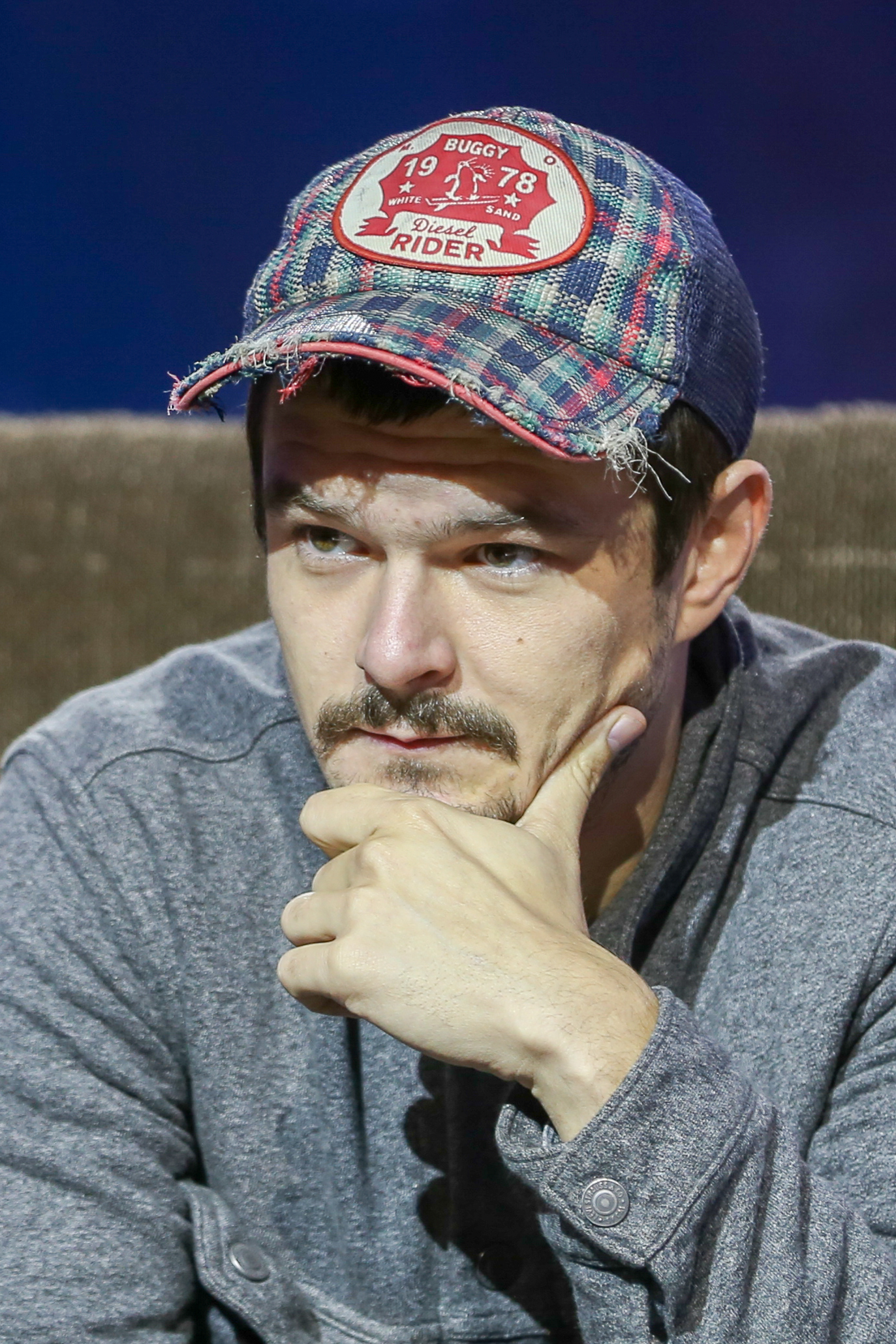
- Born: 15 June 1986 (age 40); Wągrowiec, Poland
- Occupation: Actor
- Years active: 2007–present

Dawid Ogrodnik (born 15 June 1986, Wągrowiec) is a Polish actor. He has appeared in more than ten films since 2010. He was honoured by the Polish Film Academy with three Polish Academy Awards for Best Actor.

== Filmography ==
| Year | Title | Role | Notes |
|---|---|---|---|
| 2007 | Detektywi | | TV series |
| 2009 | Majka | Krzysztof | Telenovela |
| 2012 | True Law | Dawid Kowal | 1 episodes |
| 2012 | You Are God | Rahim | Biographical film 2012 - Award for Male Supporting Role in Gdynia Film Festival; 2013 - (Nomineted) Polish Academy Award for Best Supporting Actor |
| 2013 | Life Feels Good | Mateusz Rosiński | Drama film, main role 2013 - Award 'Kryształowa Gwiazda Elle' in Gdynia Film Festival; 2013 - Award 'Zloty Szczeniak' in Festiwal Aktorstwa Filmowego im. Tadeusza Szymkowa; 2014 - Actor's Award in Gijón International Film Festival; 2014 - Zbyszek Cybulski's Award; 2014 - Main Award for Best Actor in New York Polish Film Festival; 2014 - Polish Academy Award for Best Actor; 2014 - Paszport Polityki; 2014 - Golden Space Needle Award in Seattle International Film Festival; 2014 - Award in The International Film Festival of the New European Cinema 'Golden Tilia' |
| 2013 | Ida | 'Lis' | Drama film, movie won the 2015 Academy Award for Best Foreign Language Film |
| 2014 | Obietnica | Daniel | Thriller; 2014 - Award for Male Supporting Role in Gdynia Film Festival |
| 2015 | Disco Polo | Tomek | Comedy film |
| 2015 | 11 Minutes | courier | |
| 2016 | The Last Family | Tomasz Beksiński, Zdzisław Beksiński's son | Biographical film 2016 - Actor's Award in Festival of Young European Cinema in Cottbus; 2016 - Award 'Odkrycie Festivalu' in Gdynia Film Festival; 2017 - (nominated) Zbyszek Cybulski's Award; 2017 - (nominated) - Polish Academy Award for Best Supporting Actor |
| 2017 | Silent Night | Adam | Thriller; 2017 - Award for Actor in a Leading Role in Gdynia Film Festival |
| 2018 | O Grande Circo Místico | Ludwig | |
| 2019 | Oleg | Andrzej | Drama; 2019 - Latvia's Lielais Kristaps Award for Best Supporting Actor |
| 2019 | Icarus: The Legend of Mietek Kosz | Mieczysław “Mietek” Kosz | |
| 2020 | Magnesium | Albert Hudini | |
| 2021 | The Getaway King | Zdzisław Najmrodzki | main role - action, comedy, biographical film |
| 2021 | All Our Fears | Daniel Rycharski | main role |
| 2022 | Broad Peak | Adam Bielecki | |
| 2022 | Johnny | Jan Kaczkowski | |
| 2023 | Jedna dusza | Alojz Guzy | |
| 2024 | Piep*zyć Mickiewicza | Jan Sienkiewicz | |
| 2024 | Rojst Millenium | Piotr Zarzycki | |
| 2024 | Czarne stokrotki | aspirant Rafał Nieć | TV series, main role |
| 2024 | Zdrada | prokurator Patryk Wysocki | |
| 2025 | Piep*zyć Mickiewicza 2 | Jan Sienkiewicz | |
| 2025 | Las | kułak | |
| 2026 | Piep*zyć Mickiewicza 3 | Jan Sienkiewicz | |
| 2026 | The Doll | salesman (subiekt) Mraczewski | |
| 2026 | Felicità | | |
