= All Our Fears =

- Directed by: Łukasz Ronduda; Łukasz Gutt
- Written by: Łukasz Ronduda; Michał Oleszczyk; Katarzyna Sarnowska
- Produced by: Kuba Kosma; Katarzyna Sarnowska
- Starring: Dawid Ogrodnik; Maria Maj; Andrzej Chyra; Jacek Poniedziałek; Oskar Rybaczek; Agata Łabno; Jowita Budnik
- Cinematography: Łukasz Gutt
- Edited by: Przemysław Chruścielewski; Kamil Grabowski
- Music by: Igor Kłaczyński; Marcin Lenarczyk; Bartosz Łupiński
- Production company: Serce
- Release date: 23 September 2021 (FPFF)
- Running time: 91 minutes
- Country: Poland
- Language: Polish
- Box office: $ 71 833

All Our Fears (Polish: Wszystkie nasze strachy) is a 2021 Polish biographical film about Roman Catholic gay activist Daniel Rycharski. The film was directed by Łukasz Gutt and Łukasz Ronduda, and stars Dawid Ogrodnik as Rycharski.

== Plot ==
Daniel, an activist respected by the rural community, is in love with Olek, a boy from the neighborhood who conceals his sexual identity; their relationship is a secret. When teenage friend Jagoda commits suicide under the influence of homophobic attacks, Daniel tries to persuade people from the village to perform Stations of the Cross for the victim, which causes the rural community to turn away from him. At a curator's suggestion, Daniel participates in an exhibition at an art gallery in Warsaw.

== Cast ==
- Dawid Ogrodnik – Daniel Rycharski
- Maria Maj – Daniel's grandmother
- Andrzej Chyra – Daniel's father
- Oskar Rybaczek – Olek

== Awards ==
- Best film at 2021 Polish Film Festival
