= Newsweek Polska =

Polish weekly news magazine

- Editor-in-chief: Tomasz Sekielski
- Categories: News magazine
- Frequency: Weekly
- Publisher: Ringier Axel Springer Polska
- Total circulation: 67,700 (January 2020)
- Founded: 2001; 25 years ago
- Country: Poland
- Based in: Warsaw
- Language: Polish
- Website: www.newsweek.pl
- ISSN: 1642-5685
- OCLC: 51636338

Newsweek Polska is a Polish language weekly news magazine published in Poland as the Polish edition of Newsweek.

== History ==
Newsweek Polska was established in 2001. The founder of the weekly is Tomasz Wróblewski.

The magazine is owned by Axel Springer. It is based in Warsaw and is published weekly on Mondays. Although it is a Polish version of Newsweek, it does not fully cover the translations of the articles published in its parent magazine.

Tomasz Wróblewski was also the first editor-in-chief and served in the post between 2001 and 2004, and then between 2005 and 2006. Jarosław Sroka was the editor-in-chief in 2004. From 2006 to 2009 Michał Kobosko was the editor-in-chief. He was replaced by Wojciech Maziarski who was in office between 2009 and 2012. Tomasz Lis was the editor-in-chief from 2012 to 2022. Tomasz Sekielski was appointed as the new editor-in-chief on June 1, 2022.

== Ideology ==
Newsweek has promoted a variety of views, mostly depending on those held by the current editor-in-chief, although it has traditionally been associated with liberal politics, much like Gazeta Wyborcza. Ever since Tomasz Lis took over as editor-in-chief, the magazine has taken a more radically anticlerical, anti-conservative, and anti-left approach; the editorial board is frequently subjected to criticism from Law and Justice leader Jarosław Kaczyński. The cover of the 1 April 2015 issue featured Kaczyński with a caption saying "Assassin", implying his responsibility for the alleged "assassination" of Polish national unity in the aftermath of the 2010 Smolensk plane crash.

== Circulation ==
The circulation of Newsweek Polska in March 2009 was 192,000 copies. The magazine had a circulation of 114,309 copies in 2010 and 106,509 copies in 2011. It was 123,225 copies in 2012. The print and e-edition circulation of the weekly was 119,776 in August 2014. As of January 2020, circulation of Newsweek Polska was 67,700 copies, and as of January 2022, it was 65,885 copies.

== See also ==
- List of magazines in Poland
