= Jan P. Matuszyński =

Polish film director

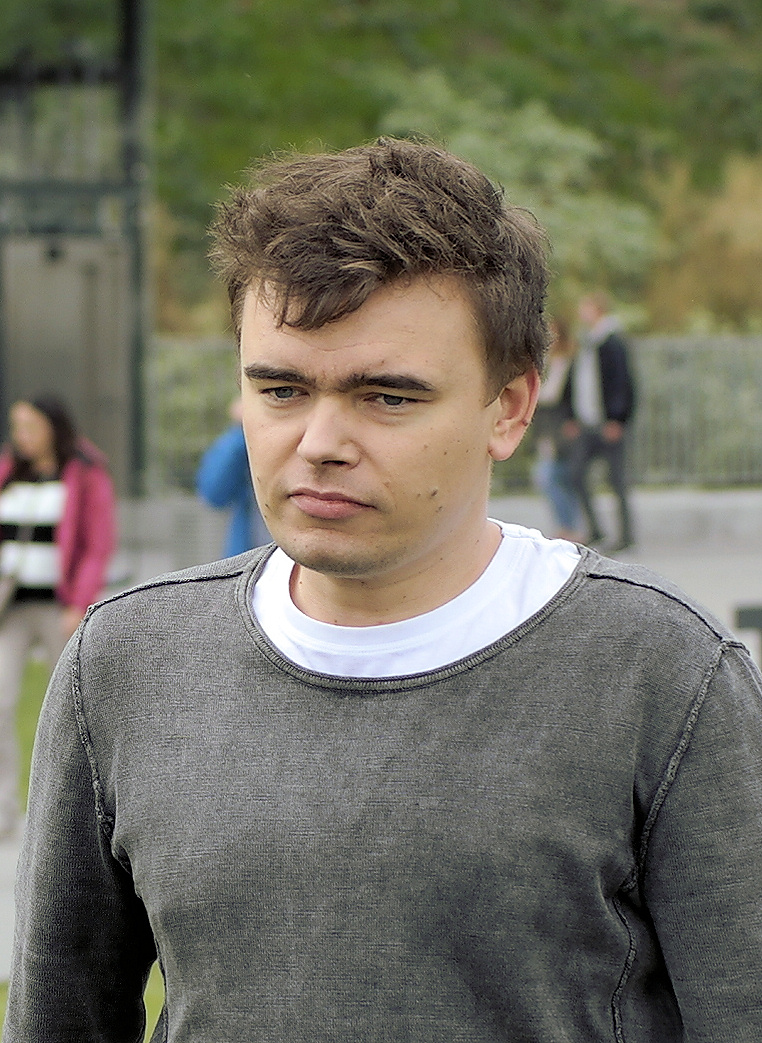
- Matuszyński in 2016
- Born: 23 April 1984 (age 42); Katowice, Poland
- Education: Krzysztof Kieślowski Film School, University of Silesia
- Occupation: Film director

Jan Paweł Matuszyński ([jan pavɛw matuszɨɲski]; born 23 April 1984, Katowice) is a Polish film director and a producer of documentary films.

== Life ==
In 2012, he graduated in Film and Television Directing at the Krzysztof Kieślowski Film School in Katowice. In 2014, he was awarded the Silver George Award at the Moscow Film Festival for his documentary film Deep Love.

In 2016, he won the Golden Lions award at the 41st Gdynia Film Festival for Ostatnia rodzina (The Last Family), a film telling the story of artist Zdzisław Beksiński, starring Andrzej Seweryn (awarded the Silver Leopard for that role at the Locarno Film Festival) and Dawid Ogrodnik. In 2016, he was awarded the Paszport Polityki Award in the film category for Ostatnia rodzina.

His latest film Żeby nie było śladów (Leave No Traces) entered the main competition at the 78th Venice International Film Festival.

== Filmography ==
- Afterparty, etude, 2009
- Amisze znad Wisły, documentary, 2010
- Niebo, documentary, 2011
- Offline, short film, 2012
- Deep Love, documentary, 2013
- Kolaudacja, documentary, 2014
- The Last Family, 2016
- Król (The King), TV series, 2020
- Żeby nie było śladów (Leave No Traces), 2021
- Minghun, 2024

== See also ==
- Polish cinema
