= Daniel Rycharski =

Visual artist (born 1986)

- Born: 1986 (age 39–40); Sierpc
- Occupation: Visual artist

Daniel Przemysław Rycharski (born 1986) is a visual artist and teacher at the Szczecin Art Academy.

== Biography ==
Between 2005 and 2009, he formed an art group with Sławomir Shuty. In 2009 he graduated from the Art Faculty of the Pedagogical University of Kraków and returned to his home village of Kurówko. He obtained doctorate from the Academy of Fine Arts in Kraków in 2013. He is the creator of films, multimedia installations, and site-specific objects, as well as a cultural animator. In 2020 he obtained habilitation. He was portrayed by Dawid Ogrodnik in the 2021 film All Our Fears. He made set design for the 2024 television spectacle Spartakus. Miłość w czasach zarazy.

== Exhibitions ==
- Fears, Museum of Modern Art in Warsaw, 2019.
- Undressing From Sleep. Rycharski. Hasior, Trafostacja Sztuki, Szczecin, 2025.

== Accolades ==
- Paszport Polityki (2017)
- Dorothea von Stetten Art Award (2022)
