= Andrzej Morozowski =

Polish journalist (1957–2026)

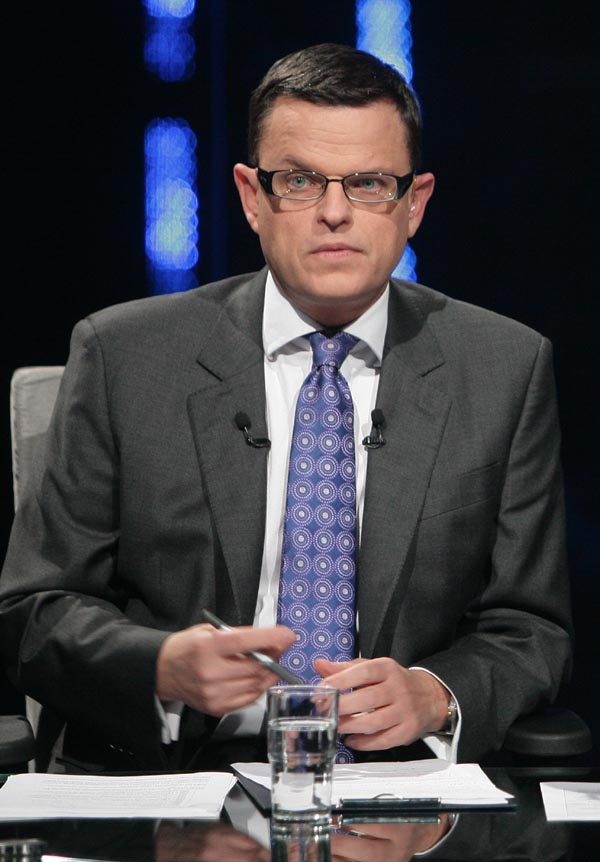
- Morozowski in 2006
- Born: 13 June 1957; Warsaw, Poland
- Died: 4 August 2026 (aged 69)
- Occupation: Journalist
- Years active: 1990–2026

Andrzej Morozowski (13 June 1957 – 4 August 2026) was a Polish journalist, television personality and writer, connected to Radio ZET and TVN 24.

== Life and career ==
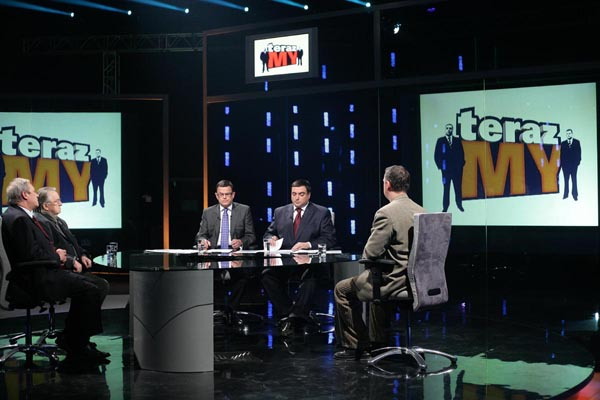
Morozowski and Tomasz Sekielski on the set of their talk show Teraz my

Andrzej Morozowski was born on 13 June 1957 in Warsaw, into a Polish-Jewish family, as a son of the communist politician Mordechaj Mozes Morozowski. Morozowski was raised without any religion. After 1968 Polish political crisis, his family stayed in Poland.

Morozowski graduated Theatre studies from the Aleksander Zelwerowicz State Theatre Academy in Warsaw. From 1990 to 2000 he worked for Radio ZET and Polish Television. From 2001 to 2026, he worked in the private television TVN 24, where he was presenting many auditions: Skaner polityczny (The Political Scanner), Bohater tygodnia (A hero of the Week), Studio 24, Kuluary (The Couloirs), Rozmowa bardzo polityczna (A very political conversation) and Prześwietlenie (The X-ray). From 2005 to 2010, Morozowski and Tomasz Sekielski presented one of the most popular political shows in Polish television, Teraz my (Now we). From 2010 to his death in 2026, he led his own show, Tak jest.

He was married to the Gazeta Wyborcza journalist, Agata Nowakowska. They had one son, Jan Morozowski.

Morozowski died on 4 August 2026, at the age of 69, after a battle with cancer.

== Books ==
- Teraz my prześwietlamy, Warsaw 2009
- Piękna dwudziestoletnia: 12 rozmów o wolnej Polsce, Warsaw 2009
- Koniec PiS-u: z Michałem Kamińskim rozmawia Andrzej Morozowski, Warsaw 2012
