= In the Rearview =

2023 documentary

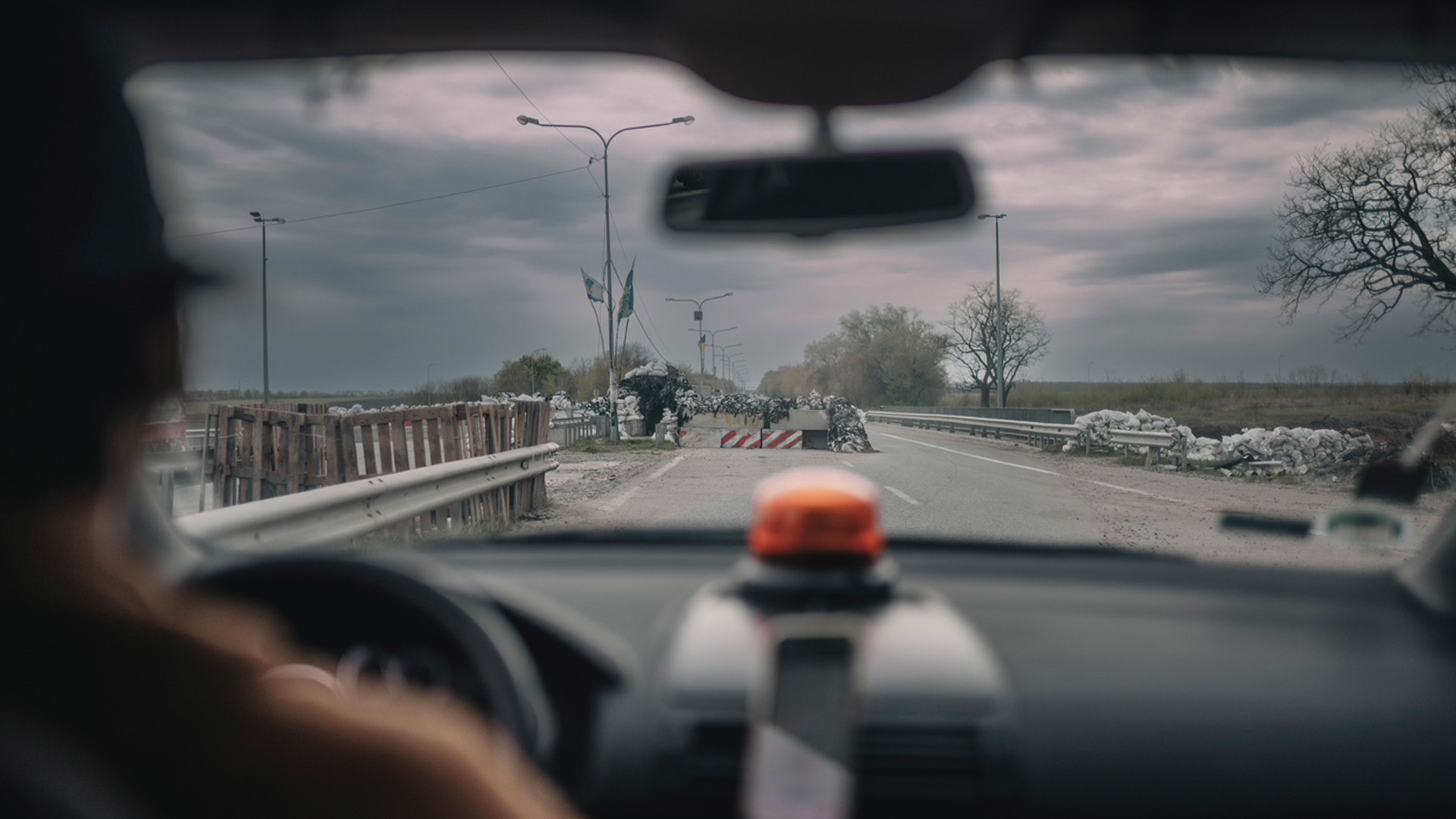
- Skąd dokąd
- Directed by: Maciek Hamela
- Written by: Maciek Hamela
- Produced by: Maciek Hamela, Piotr Grawender
- Cinematography: Yura Dunay, Wawrzyniec Skoczylas, Marcin Sierakowski, Piotr Grawender
- Edited by: Piotr Ogiński
- Music by: Antoni Komasa Łazarkiewicz
- Production companies: Pemplum (Poland), Affinity Cine (Poland), SaNoSi Productions (France), 435 FILMS (Ukraine)
- Distributed by: New Story (France), So FILMS (Poland), Film Movement (US)
- Release date: 21 May 2023 (2023 Cannes Film Festival)
- Running time: 84 minutes
- Countries: Poland, France, Ukraine
- Languages: Ukrainian, Russian, Polish, French, English

In the Rearview (Polish: Skąd dokąd, Ukrainian: «Звідки куди», romanized: Zvidky kudy) is a 2023 documentary feature film directed by Maciek Hamela. It is about a van, that traverses the roads of Ukraine with the driver-director and evacuated people, following the Russian invasion. The vehicle becomes a fragile and temporary refuge of exiles whose only objective is to escape the war. It is a co-production between Poland, France and Ukraine.

In the Rearview has made it to the shortlist of 15 films for the 96th Academy Awards® in the Best Documentary Feature Film category and is nominated for the 26th Polish Film Academy Awards in the Best Documentary Film category.

In the Rearview debuted at 2023's Millennium Docs Against Gravity festival, where it won the main prize in the Polish Competition and the Arthouse Cinema Association award, and then had its world premiere at the 76th Cannes Film Festival. Since then, it has been presented at over 50 festivals in Poland and abroad, receiving the Grand Jury Prize in the International Competition at Sheffield DocFest, which made it eligible to apply to the American Academy of Motion Picture Arts and Sciences, or main awards in Odesa, Zurich, Hamburg, and Chicago. It was also presented at Toronto Film Festival where it had its North American premiere and at DMZ International Documentary Film Festival in South Korea where it had its Asian premiere.

== Production ==
Skąd dokąd and Zvidky kudy are the Polish and Ukrainian versions of the film's title, respectively. These phrases can be translated to mean "where from" (skąd / звідки / zvidky) and "where to" (dokąd / куди / kudy). They are routine questions asked when trying to pass through the numerous checkpoints located throughout the country that Hamela passed during his trips to and from Ukraine.

The film's score was composed by Antoni Komasa-Łazarkiewicz. In addition to the original score, Komasa-Łazarkiewicz composed the film's theme, a classical piece called "The Wings" performed by the Ukrainian Choir. The theme is based on a poem of the same title by Lina Kostenko, one of Ukraine's most prominent contemporary poets.

== Release ==
In the Rearview had its world premiere at the Cannes Film Festival, in the ACID (Association for the Distribution of Independent Cinema) section. It had its international premiere in the International Competition of Sheffield DocFest, where it won the Grand Jury Prize, and North American premiere at the Toronto International Film Festival in the TIFF Docs section.

The film was sold to multiple territories, including US, Spain, Portugal, Norway, Hong Kong, Poland and France.

== Critical reception ==
On Rotten Tomatoes, In the Rearview holds an approval rating of 100% based on 18 reviews.

== Accolades ==
In the Rearview was nominated for the International Documentary Association (IDA) awards, in the Best Documentary Film category and received the Pare Lorentz Award, awarded to films that reflect the spirit and tradition of the work of Pare Lorentz.

In the Rearview was among the 14 titles on the shortlist of the Best European Documentary films, published by the European Film Academy in 2023.

== Film festivals and accolades ==
Chosen film festivals, awards and nominations for In the Rearview
Festival	Date	Section	Result	Award	Recipient(s)	Ref.
Millennium Docs Against Gravity	May 2023	Polish Competition	Won	The Best Polish Award	Maciek Hamela	
Millennium Docs Against Gravity	May 2023	Polish Competition	Won	The Arthouse Cinema Association Award	Maciek Hamela	
Cannes Film Festival	May 2023	ACID	Programed			
Sheffield DocFest	June 2023	International Competition	Won	The Grand Jury Prize	Maciek Hamela	
Iceland Documentary Film Festival – IceDocs	July 2023	Main Competition	Won	Special Mention	Maciek Hamela	
Dokufest	August 2023	International Feature Dox Competition	Nominated			
Odesa International Film Festival	August 2023	National Competition	Won	The Best Ukrainian Documentary Feature Film Award	Maciek Hamela	
Toronto International Film Festival	September 2023	TIFF Docs	Nominated			
DMZ International Documentary Film Festival	September 2023	Unable to Settle or Leave	Programed			
Festival 2 Cinéma de Valenciennes	September 2023	Documentary Competition	Won	Grand Prix	Maciek Hamela	
Festival 2 Cinéma de Valenciennes	September 2023	Documentary Competition	Won	Critics' Award	Maciek Hamela	
Festival 2 Cinéma de Valenciennes	September 2023	Documentary Competition	Won	Students' Awards	Maciek Hamela	
Filmfest Hamburg	October 2023	VETO! Competition	Won	Political Film Award for the best directorial work	Maciek Hamela	
Zurich Film Festival	October 2023	Documentary Competition	Won	The Best Documentary	Maciek Hamela	
CinEast – the Central and Eastern European Film Festival	October 2023	Focus on Ukraine	Programed			
Festival International de cinéma War on Screen	October 2023	Feature Film Competition	Won	International Jury Grand Prize	Maciek Hamela	
Opolskie Lamy Film Festival	October 2023	Feature Film Competition	Won	Grand Prix for the Best Documentary	Maciek Hamela	
Corsica.doc – International Documentary Festival	October 2023	New Talents Competition	Won	Main Award Corsica.doc/Via Stella for the Best Feature Film	Maciek Hamela	
Corsica.doc – International Documentary Festival	October 2023	New Talents Competition	Won	Youth Jury Award for the Best Feature Film	Maciek Hamela	
Chicago International Film Festival	October 2023	Documentary Competition	Won	Silver Hugo Award	Maciek Hamela	
Man in Danger Media Festival	October 2023	Documentary Competition	Won	A Kazimierz Karabasz "Patient Eye" Award	Maciek Hamela	
Man in Danger Media Festival	October 2023	Documentary Competition	Won	Audience Award	Maciek Hamela	
Ukraina! Film Festival	October 2023	Documentary Competition	Won	Best Documentary Competition Award	Maciek Hamela	
Ukraina! Film Festival	October 2023	Documentary Competition	Won	Audience Award	Maciek Hamela	
Ji.hlava International Documentary Film Festival	October 2023	Constellations	Programed			
Doc NYC	November 2023	Winner's Circle	Nominated			
IDFA - The International Documentary Film Festival	November 2023	Best of Fests	Nominated			
Zinebi – International Festival of Documentary and Short Film of Bilbao	November 2023	ZIFF – Zinebi First Film International Competition	Won	ZIFF Grand Award	Maciek Hamela	
Bastau International Film Festival	December 2023	Bastau Docs	Won	Main Prize named after Oraz Abishev	Maciek Hamela	
Palm Springs International Film Festival	January 2024	True Stories	Nominated			
Budapest International Documentary Festival BIDF	February 2024	International Competition	Nominated			
