= Life Feels Good =

- Chce się żyć
- Directed by: Maciej Pieprzyca
- Written by: Maciej Pieprzyca
- Produced by: Wiesław Łysakowski
- Starring: Dawid Ogrodnik; Dorota Kolak; Arkadiusz Jakubik; Anna Nehrebecka; Katarzyna Zawadzka; Kamil Tkacz
- Cinematography: Pawel Dyllus
- Edited by: Krzysztof Szpetmański
- Music by: Bartosz Chajdecki
- Production companies: Tramway Film Studio; Silesia Film; Telewizja Polska - Agencja Filmowa
- Distributed by: Kino Świat
- Release dates: August 25, 2013 (Montreal World Film Festival); September 2013 (Gdynia Film Festival, Poland)
- Running time: 107 minutes
- Country: Poland
- Language: Polish
- Box office: $1 438 531

Life Feels Good (Polish: Chce się żyć, lit. 'I want to live') is a 2013 Polish drama film directed by Maciej Pieprzyca.

It won the jury, audience and ecumenical prizes at the Montreal World Film Festival.

== Plot ==
It tells the story of Mateusz Rosiński who has cerebral palsy in Poland and his life from the 1980s to 2000s. It is inspired by true events.

== Cast ==
- Dawid Ogrodnik - Mateusz
- Kamil Tkacz - young Mateusz
- Dorota Kolak - Mateusz's mother
- Arkadiusz Jakubik - Mateusz's father
- Anna Nehrebecka - Jola, teacher
- Helena Sujecka - Matylda
- Mikołaj Roznerski - Tomek
- Tymoteusz Marciniak - young Tomek
- Katarzyna Zawadzka - Magda
- Anna Karczmarczyk - Anka
- Agnieszka Kotlarska - Anka's mother
- Janusz Chabior - "Łysy"
- Gabriela Muskała - doctor
- Lech Dyblik - healer
- Dariusz Chojnacki - Matylda's fiancé
- Izabela Dąbrowska - neighbor
- Witold Wieliński - neighbor
- Mirosław Neinert - uncle
- Grażyna Bułka - aunt
- Klaudia Kąca-Jasik - cousin
- Małgorzata Moskalewicz - Tomek's girlfriend
- Bernadetta Komiago - customer
- Marek Kalita - Magda's father
- Teresa Iwko - Magda's stepmother
- Grzegorz Mielczarek - counselor Krzysztof
- Ewa Serwa - head of medical center

== Awards ==
Award		Category	Recipient	Result
Polish Film Awards 2014	Eagle	Best Film		Nominated
Polish Film Awards 2014	Eagle	Best Director	Maciej Pieprzyca	Nominated
Polish Film Awards 2014	Eagle	Best Screenplay	Maciej Pieprzyca	Won
Polish Film Awards 2014	Eagle	Best Editing	Krzysztof Szpetmański	Nominated
Polish Film Awards 2014	Eagle	Best Leading Actor	Dawid Ogrodnik	Won
Polish Film Awards 2014	Eagle	Best Supporting Actress	Anna Nehrebecka	Won
Polish Film Awards 2014	Eagle	Best Supporting Actor	Arkadiusz Jakubik	Won
Polish Film Awards 2014	Eagle	Audience Award		Won
Montreal World Film Festival 2013	Grand Prix des Americas			Won
Montreal World Film Festival 2013	Public Award	Most Popular Film of the Festival		Won
Montreal World Film Festival 2013	Ecumenical Prize			Won
Gdynia Film Festival 2013	Silver Lion			Won
Gdynia Film Festival 2013	Audience Award			Won
Chicago International Film Festival 2013	Silver Hugo	New Directors Competition		Won
Chicago International Film Festival 2013	Audience Choice Award	Best Narrative Foreign-Language Feature		Won
International Film Festival TOFIFEST 2013	Golden Angel	From Poland competition Audience Award		Won
Polish Film Festival in America 2013	Golden Teeth	Most Interesting Feature Film		Won
Cleveland International Film Festival 2014	Roxanne T. Mueller Audience Choice Award	Best Film		Runner Up
Cleveland International Film Festival 2014	George Gund III Memorial Award	Central and Eastern European Film Competition		Won
Polish Society of Cinematographers 2014	PSC Award		Pawel Dyllus	Nominated
Off Plus Camera International Festival of Independent Cinema 2014	Polish Feature Film Competition	Best Actress	Dorota Kolak	Won
New York Polish Film Festival 2014	Krzysztof Kieslowski Prize	Best Film		Won
New York Polish Film Festival 2014	Elzbieta Czyszewska Award	Best Acting	Dawid Ogrodnik	Won
Seattle International Film Festival 2014	Golden Space Needle	Best Film		First Runner-up
Seattle International Film Festival 2014	Golden Space Needle	Best Director	Maciej Pieprzyca	First Runner-up
Seattle International Film Festival 2014	Golden Space Needle	Best Actor	Dawid Ogrodnik	Won
Golden Linden International Film Festival of New European Cinema 2014	Golden Linden	Best Actor	Dawid Ogrodnik	Won
VOICES Film Festival 2014	Audience Prize			Won
