= Icarus: The Legend of Mietek Kosz =

2019 film directed by Maciej Pieprzyca

- Directed by: Maciej Pieprzyca
- Written by: Maciej Pieprzyca
- Starring: Dawid Ogrodnik, Cyprian Grabowski
- Cinematography: Witold Płóciennik
- Edited by: Piotr Kmiecik
- Music by: Leszek Możdżer
- Release date: 2019
- Running time: 117 minutes
- Country: Poland
- Language: Polish

Icarus: The Legend of Mietek Kosz (Ikar. Legenda Mietka Kosza) is a 2019 film written and directed by Maciej Pieprzyca, starring Dawid Ogrodnik as pianist Mieczysław “Mietek” Kosz.

== Production ==
The film was shot between 12 October 2018 and December 2018. Locations included Kraków, Warszawa and Dąbrowa Górnicza.

== Cast ==
Source.

- Dawid Ogrodnik as Mieczysław “Mietek” Kosz
- Cyprian Grabowski as Mieczysław “Mietek” Kosz (child)
- Jowita Budnik as Agata Kosz, mother of Mieczysław “Mietek” Kosz
- Piotr Adamczyk as pianist Bogdan Danowicz
- Mikołaj Chroboczek as double bassist Gutek
- Wiktoria Gorodeckaja as Marta
- Justyna Wasilewska as singer Zuza
- Michał Filipiak as double bassist Włodek
- Jacek Koman as Stanisław Kosz, father of Mieczysław “Mietek” Kosz
- Dariusz Chojnacki as Zenek Kosz, brother of Mieczysław “Mietek” Kosz
- Grzegorz Mielczarek as Marian Wolski, Vice-President of the Polish Jazz Federation
- Maja Komorowska as professor Aniela, teacher of “Mietek”

== Accolades ==
- 2020 Polish Film Awards:

Polish Academy Award for Best Film Score – Leszek Możdżer
Polish Academy Award for Best Sound – Maciej Pawłowski and Robert Czyżewicz
