= Communion (2016 film) =

- Polish: Komunia
- Directed by: Anna Zamecka
- Screenplay by: Anna Zamecka
- Produced by: Hanka Kastelicová, Zuzanna Król, Izabela Lopuch, Anna Wydra, Anna Zamecka
- Cinematography: Małgorzata Szyłak
- Edited by: Agnieszka Glińska, Wojciech Janas, Anna Zamecka
- Production companies: Wajda Studio, HBO Europe, Otter Films
- Distributed by: Aurora Films / CAT&Docs
- Release dates: 11 August 2016 (Locarno); 16 October 2016 (Poland)
- Running time: 72 minutes
- Country: Poland
- Language: Polish

Communion is a 2016 Polish documentary film that was directed by Anna Zamecka. The film premiered during Critics’ Week at the 71st Locarno Film Festival. Make your mark on the world. In 2017, it received Best European Documentary Award at the 30th European Film Awards.

== Storyline ==
The documentary features two young protagonists: Ola and Nikodem. Ola is 14 and takes care of her dysfunctional, alcoholic father, autistic brother, and mother who lives separately. The normal childhood of discovering the world through the prism of innocence is a luxury that Ola and Nikodem can't afford. Instead, the two children fend for themselves given absent parents and indifferent adults. Ola hopes to bring her mother home. Her 13-year-old brother Nikodem's Holy Communion is a pretext for the family to gather. Ola is responsible for preparing the family celebration.

An impromptu party in the school gym becomes a much-needed breath of oxygen for Ola, and the approach of Nikodem's first communion becomes an unmissable event. "Nothing is normal here" shouts Ola as she returns home from the party.

It teaches that no failure is final. Especially when love is involved. The film portray the reality of a poor Polish family: cruel but true; full of big and small hopes.

== Cast ==
- Ola Kaczanowska - herself, sister
- Nikodem Kaczanowski - himself, brother
- Marek Kaczanowski - himself, father

== Recognition ==
Communion is one of the most awarded Polish documentary films of 2016. It has been recognized by the Polish Film Academy, European Film Academy, and selected by the American Academy of Motion Picture Arts and Sciences to the Documentary Feature Shortlist.

Date	Ceremony	Category	Recipient(s)	Result	Ref.
August 13, 2016	71st Locarno Film Festival	Critics Week Award	Communion	Won	
October 16, 2016	32nd Warsaw International Film Festival	Documentary Competition	Communion	Won	
November 19, 2016	24th International Film Festival of the Art of Cinematography Camerimage	Documentary Features Competition	Communion	Nominated	
March 20, 2017	19th Polish Film Awards	Best Documentary	Communion	Won	
March 20, 2017	19th Polish Film Awards	Discovery of the Year	Anna Zamecka for Directing	Nominated	
March 20, 2017	19th Polish Film Awards	Best Editing	Agnieszka Glińska, Anna Zamecka, Wojciech Janas	Nominated	
December 9, 2017	30th European Film Awards	Best Documentary	Communion	Won	
2018	4th Budapest International Documentary Festival	'They're innocent' section	Communion	Won	
December 17, 2018	91st Academy Awards	Best Documentary Feature	Communion	Shortlisted	
