= Andrzej Seweryn =

Polish actor and director (born 1946)

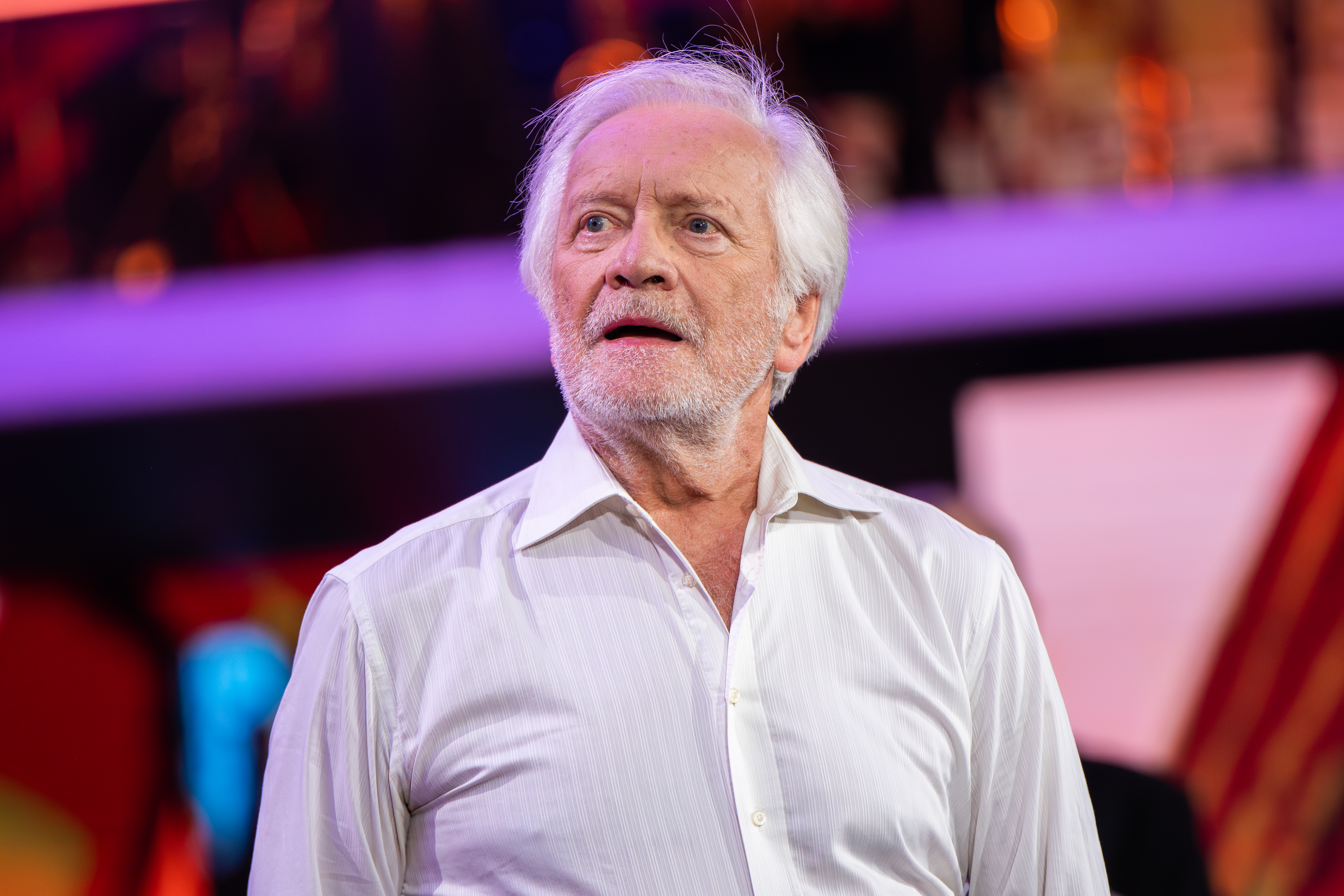
- Seweryn in 2025
- Born: 25 April 1946 (age 80); Heilbronn, Germany
- Education: National Academy of Dramatic Art in Warsaw
- Occupations: Actor; director
- Years active: 1964–present
- Spouses: Katarzyna Kubacka (m. 2015) Mireille Maalouf (1988-2015); Laurence Bourdil (1982-1987): Krystyna Janda (1974-1979)
- Children: 3

Andrzej Teodor Seweryn (Polish pronunciation: [ˈand͡ʐɛj sɛˈvɛrɨn]; born 25 April 1946) is a Polish actor and director. Regarded as one of the most successful Polish theatre actors, he starred in over 50 films, mostly in Poland, France, and Germany. He is also one of only three non-French actors to have been hired by the Paris-based Comédie-Française. In 2017, he received the Polish Academy Award for Best Actor for his portrayal of painter Zdzisław Beksiński in the biographical film The Last Family. In 2023, he was honoured with the Polish Academy Award for Best Supporting Actor for his performance in drama film Śubuk.

He is currently serving as director general of the Polski Theatre in Warsaw. In 1990, he was ranked among the three greatest Polish dramatic actors after 1965 alongside Piotr Fronczewski and Wojciech Pszoniak.

== Life and career ==
Andrzej Seweryn was born on 25 April 1946 in Heilbronn, Germany. His parents, Zdzisław and Zofia, were captured and forced into slave labor in Germany during World War II. After the birth of Andrzej, they returned to Poland. He was raised in Warsaw where he attended the Joachim Lelewel High School No. 41. In 1968 he graduated from the National Academy of Dramatic Art in Warsaw and worked at Teatr Ateneum where he continued to act until 1980. He was one of the co-organizers of the 1968 student protest at the University of Warsaw in response to the banning of Dziady (Forefathers' Eve) directed by Kazimierz Dejmek by the Polish communist authorities. In the same year, he spent five months in prison for distributing leaflets against the Warsaw Pact invasion of Czechoslovakia.

Already in the 1970s he gained much fame following his appearance in numerous films directed by Andrzej Wajda, notably Without Anesthesia, The Promised Land and the Man of Iron. For his role in Wajda's 1980 Dyrygent Seweryn received the Silver Bear for Best Actor at the 30th Berlin International Film Festival. In 1980 Seweryn also made his stage debut in France following the staging of Wajda's interpretation of plays by Stanisław Witkiewicz at the Théâtre Nanterre-Amandiers.

The imposition of the martial law in Poland in 1981 found Seweryn in France. A sympathiser of the outlawed Solidarity, he decided to stay abroad and settle in France. With time he also applied for French citizenship. During his stay in France he collaborated with some of the most renowned theatre directors. Among them were Claude Régy (La Trilogie du revoir and Grand et Petit by Botho Strauss), Patrice Chéreau (Peer Gynt by Ibsen), Peter Brook (The Mahabharata), Bernard Sobel (Nathan the Wise by Gotthold Ephraim Lessing, The Good Person of Szechwan by Bertold Brecht, Tartuffe by Molière), Deborah Warner (A Doll's House by Henrik Ibsen), Antoine Vitez (L'Échange by Paul Claudel), Jacques Rosner (The Cherry Orchard by Anton Chekhov and Breakfast with Wittgenstein based on a novel by Thomas Bernhard), and Jacques Lassalle (Jedermann by Hugo von Hofmannsthal and The Misanthrope by Molière).

Since 1993 he has performed in Comédie Française in Paris (receiving full membership in 1995, as the third non-French in the history of that theatre) and taught at the Paris Conservatoire. In 1996 he received Witkacy Prize - Critics' Circle Award. In 2000, he became a member of the Polish Academy of Arts and Sciences. For his contribution to French culture in 2005 was awarded with Légion d'honneur, in addition to Ordre des Arts et des Lettres and Ordre national du Mérite. In 2008, he was awarded the Commander's Cross of the Order of Polonia Restituta.

Andrzej Seweryn appeared in over 50 motion pictures, most them Polish, French and German productions. He is best known in the United States for his portrayal as Julian Scherner in the film Schindler's List. Seweryn was allegedly chosen for the role of Scherner since he bore a striking physical resemblance to the actual Julian Scherner, based upon photographic evidence from World War II. He has also portrayed the French Revolutionary leader Maximilien Robespierre, in the film and mini-series La Révolution française (1989) ('The French Revolution').

His 2006 film Who Never Lived was entered into the 28th Moscow International Film Festival. In the same year, he received the Gold Medal for Merit to Culture – Gloria Artis. Between 2008–2011, he served as a member of the Council of the Polish Film Institute.

In 2016, he won the Best Actor Award at the Locarno International Film Festival for his portrayal of painter Zdzisław Beksiński in Jan P. Matuszyński's 2016 biopic The Last Family. In 2017, he also won the Polish Academy Award for Best Actor as well as Best Actor Award at the annual Gdynia Film Festival for the same role.

In 2023, he won the Polish Academy Award for Best Supporting Actor for his role in Jacek Lusiński's 2022 drama film Śubuk.

== Personal life ==
He has three children with three different wives: a daughter, Maria Seweryn (born 1975) with his second wife, Polish actress Krystyna Janda, and two sons, Yann-Baptiste and Maximilien.

== Filmography ==
- Beata (1965) as Pupil
- Album polski (1970, a.k.a. Polish Album) as Tomek
- Przejście podziemne (1974, TV Short, a.k.a. The Underground Passage) as Stach
- Ziemia Obiecana (1975, a.k.a. The Promised Land) as Maks Baum
- Noce i dnie (1975, a.k.a. Nights and Days) as Anzelm Ostrzenski
- Opadły liście z drzew (1975, a.k.a. Leaves Have Fallen) as Smukły
- Zaklęte rewiry (1975, a.k.a. Hotel Pacific) as Henek (voice)
- Obrazki z życia (1975, a.k.a. Pictures From Life) as Writer
- Polskie drogi (1977, TV Series) as Sturmbannführer Kliefhorn
- Człowiek z marmuru (1977) a.k.a. Man of Marble as Reader (voice)
- Długa noc poślubna (1977, TV Movie a.k.a. Long Honeymoon)
- Granica (1978, a.k.a. The Limit) as Zenon Ziembiewicz
- Bez znieczulenia (1978) a.k.a. Without Anesthesia as Jerzy Rosciszewski
- Bestia (1978, a.k.a. Beast) as Ksiadz
- Roman i Magda (1979, a.k.a. Roman and Magda) as Roman Barwinski
- Rodzina Połanieckich (1979, TV Series) as Bukacki
- Kung-Fu (1979) as Marek Kaminski
- Dyrygent (1980, a.k.a. Orchestra Conductor) as Adam Pietryk
- Golem (1980) as Doctor Creating Pernat
- Człowiek z żelaza (1981) a.k.a. Man of Iron as Kapt. Wirski
- Dziecinne pytania (1981, a.k.a. Childish Questions) as Bogdan
- Peer Gynt (1981, TV Movie) as Le cuisinier / Le propriétaire d'Haegstad / Le père de la mariée
- Najdłuższa wojna nowoczesnej Europy (1982, TV Series) as Hipolit Cegielski
- Roza (1982)
- Danton (1983) as Bourdon
- Marynia (1984) as Edward Bukacki
- Haute Mer (1985, TV Movie)
- Qui trop embrasse... (1986) as Marc
- La Femme de ma vie (1986, a.k.a. Women of My Life) as Bernard
- La Coda del diavolo (1986, a.k.a. The Malady of Love) as The pedlar
- Na srebrnym globie (1987, a.k.a. The Silver Globe) as Marek
- La Révolution française (film) (1989, 'The French Revolution') as Maximilien-Marie-Isidore De Robespierre
- The Mahabharata (1989, TV Mini-Series) as Yudhishthira
- La bonne Âme de Setchouan (1990, TV Movie) as Wang
- Napoleon (1991, TV Series)
- La Condanna (1991, a.k.a. The Conviction) as Giovanni, Public attorney
- Indochine (1992) as Hebrard
- L'Échange (1992, Short)
- Amok
- Schindler's List (1993) as Julian Scherner
- Podróż na wschód (1994, TV Movie, a.k.a. A Journey East) as Jakub
- Le Fils du cordonnier (1994, TV Mini-Series) as Célestin
- Ohnivé jaro (1994)
- Total Eclipse (1995) as Mr. Maute De Fleurville
- Lucie Aubrac (1997) as Lt. Schlondorf
- Généalogies d'un crime (1997, a.k.a. Genealogies of a Crime) as Christian
- Billboard (1998) as Agency Manager
- Ogniem i mieczem (1999, a.k.a. With Fire and Sword) as Jeremi Wiśniowiecki
- Pan Tadeusz (1999, a.k.a. Tadeusz or the Last Foray in Lithuania) as Judge Soplica
- Prymas - trzy lata z tysiąca (2000, a.k.a. The Primate) as Stefan Wyszyński
- Zemsta (2002, a.k.a. The Revenge) as Rejent Milczek
- Par amour (2003, TV Movie) as François
- À ton image (2004) as Professor Cardoze
- Kto nigdy nie żył... (2006) as Ordynator
- Ekipa (2007, TV Series) as President Juliusz Szczęsny
- Laa rounde de nuit (2007, a.k.a. Nightwatching) as Piers Hasselburg
- La Possibilité d'une île (2008) as Slotan
- Różyczka (2010, a.k.a. Little Rose) as Adam Warczewski
- Uwikłanie (2011) as Witold
- You Ain't Seen Nothin' Yet! (2012) as Marcellin
- Sep (2013) as Reatorski
- Zblizenia (2014) as Andrzej Milewski
- Anatomia zla (2015) as Roman Szerepeta
- The Last Family (2016) as Zdzisław Beksiński
- Artyści (2016, TV series) as firefighter
- The Mire (2018, TV series) as Witold Wanycz
- Solid Gold (2018) as Tadeusz Kawecki
- The Mire97 (2021, TV series) as Witold Wanycz
- Queen (2022, TV series) as Sylwester / Loretta
- Irena's Vow (2023) as Shulz
- Doppelgänger (2023) as Roman Wieczorek
- Scarborn (2023) as Duchnowski
- The Doll (2026) as Tomasz Lecki

== See also ==
- Cinema of Poland
- Theatre of Poland
- List of Polish actors
