= The Coldest Game =

- Theatrical release poster
- Directed by: Łukasz Kośmicki
- Screenplay by: Łukasz Kośmicki; Marcel Sawicki
- Produced by: Piotr Woźniak-Starak; Krzysztof Terej; Daniel Baur
- Starring: Bill Pullman; Lotte Verbeek; James Bloor; Robert Więckiewicz
- Cinematography: Paweł Edelman
- Edited by: Robert Gryka; Wolfgang Weigl; Krzysztof Arszennik
- Music by: Łukasz Targosz
- Production company: Watchout Studio
- Release date: November 8, 2019
- Running time: 103 minutes
- Country: Poland
- Language: English

The Coldest Game (Polish: Ukryta gra) is a 2019 English-language Polish spy film. It is directed by Łukasz Kośmicki and stars Bill Pullman as Joshua Mansky, an American alcoholic former chess champion who becomes involved in a Cold War confrontation between nuclear superpowers.

This spy thriller is the last film produced by Piotr Woźniak-Starak, who died in an apparent boating accident shortly before the premiere.

== Plot ==
In 1962, at the height of the Cold War, President Kennedy warns that the USSR is preparing for war, during the Cuban Missile Crisis. The first scene is the Grand Master chess match between the dazed American with blood on his hand who walks out to the already seated Russian.

Seven days earlier, the American chess player is in a poker game and switches off the news about the upcoming chess match between Soviet Alexander Gavrylov and the American Konigsberg. He wins and receives his cut from the barman who regularly sets him up with weak players.

Agent Stone approaches the chess player, claiming to recognize him as Joshua Mansky, a brilliant mathematician and former champion chess player. Ignoring her, Mansky walks out but is abducted and drugged by Agent White. The head of the operation, Agent Novak, debriefs the genius but volatile Mansky, who defeated Konigsberg twenty years ago, in a safe room.

To help win the Cold War, Mansky is to compete in a tournament against Alexander Gavrylov in Warsaw, Poland, as American contender Konigsberg has died from a Soviet poisoning. Per tournament rules, Mansky is the only eligible substitute, as he was the last person to beat him years ago.

Mansky, an extreme alcoholic, agrees to play but drinks himself into a stupor. Amphetamines are used so he can officially present himself as the American replacement. In the chess match's venue Palace of Culture and Science Mansky meets hotel director and fellow drinker Alfred Slega. General Krutov, Soviet counterintelligence, tells Slega to 'look after' Mansky.

Four days before the opening scene, Mansky recalls getting drunk with Slega in the morning and nothing else, including the first chess game, which he won in only 32 moves. His brilliance is closely tied to his alcoholism, as alcohol helps slow his brain so he can operate more normally.

Krutov exhorts Gavrylov to keep playing on despite losing the first match. He tells Slega to deny the American alcohol, but Mansky carries off a bottle from a social function.

In the second game, a hypnotist blocks Mansky's thoughts so he concedes. Agent White pursues him out of the theatre, but is stopped by the Soviets who threaten his family and pregnant wife. Gift, a Soviet officer working with the Americans, is in the audience: Agent White is the only American to know what he looks like and following rules about disclosure does not reveal this to others.

Slega befriends Mansky, coming to him secretly through his wardrobe which connects to the lobby toilets, where he hides alcohol for him. He tells him about Soviet influence over Poland, and views the Warsaw Pact as a continuation of the German Nazi occupation. Together, they sneak in and out of the hotel through the sewer, and Mansky learns the city's topography through the Hotel Director like a chess board.

Slega possesses a little red communist party membership book that allows immunity from Soviet troop questioning. At a bar they meet many of his friends, who support Mansky in chess over Gavrylov, and are sympathetic to American values.

The next day Agent White visits Mansky’s Soviet-bugged room. He says Gift will approach him, a trustworthy man in a Soviet uniform with a scar on the back of his right hand, he then dies in Mansky’s arms, poisoned.

Mansky calls Agent Stone, who asks him why Agent White visited him. Also he says the room is bugged, but she insists the room is clean. Mansky becomes distraught, so Stone takes him to the US embassy on medical grounds, where they brief him on the latest in Cuba. The third game is considered a draw due to his feigned illness.

'John Gift' is a high ranking Soviet officer and spy, whose only contact was Agent White. He was about to deliver the blueprints for the warheads bound for Cuba earlier (but the Soviets were tipped off by a mole, and stung the Americans). As Gift was coming to Warsaw for the tournament, the chess game is in fact a game within a game, so he can slip the Americans critical information about Soviet capabilities and intentions in Cuba.

Gift knows he can trust Mansky, so Agent Stone tells him he will get the blueprints' microfilm from him, hidden in a champagne cork. Therefore Mansky has to make the next game a draw, so the Soviet delegation comes to the after-match social event.

General Krutov tells a staff member that American democracy discriminates against women and Blacks, and perpetuates social economic inequality, forcing poorer nations to give the USA their riches, waging war against those who don't. Mansky tells Agent Stone about his regrettable aid in helping Robert Oppenheimer and the Manhattan Project to create nuclear weapons.

During the fourth game, Mansky looks to the audience often during the game, obviously distracted, speculating who might be John Gift. In a break he goes to the lobby toilets to have a drink from a bottle hidden in a stall, whereupon Krutov's staff member enters his cubicle and hands him a cork. Agent Stone then enters the same stall, telling Mansky to keep the cork despite his offering it to her, as the bell rings indicating the break in chess play is over. Then both she and the Soviet exit the stall and are killed by Gift, who is wearing a Soviet uniform. From under the stall door where Mansky is attempting to hide, Mansky watches Gift find a syringe in Stone's handbag. Gift confronts Mansky directly and tells him Agent Stone was going to use the syringe contents on Mansky.

Mansky returns to the game, shaken and with Agent Stone's blood on his hand from the cork, which is the opening scene of the film. His brain, transformed by the alcohol, switches on and he proposes a draw. His opponent disdainfully turns this down, believing Mansky is in a bad position. When Mansky makes a series of quick moves and countermoves, the increasingly frustrated Gavrylov accepts his next proposal for a draw, squaring the series 2-2.

When Mansky asks to return to the US embassy, he is told the American delegation are quarantined in the hotel. He goes back to his room, and doesn't attend the usual social event after the match, although the Soviet delegation and Gavrylov do.

When Slega smuggles alcohol out of the event and into Mansky’s room via the secret entrance, Mansky asks him for help. Knowing the room is bugged, Slega turns up the radio loudly. Saying he cannot escort Mansky out, but gives him the red book, and says to make sure the Soviets can't trace it back to him if he gets caught. Mansky escapes into the city via the secret passageways to head to the US embassy.

24 hours from a Cuban confrontation, in the US embassy safe room, Mansky recounts the events to Agent Novak – and says that Gift killed Stone before she could kill him. Before leaving the toilet, Gift gave him a second champagne cork, and soaked the false one in Stone’s blood, to help him distinguish the bad cork from the good cork. He then told Mansky to remember the word Rakirovka. It still is not clear to Novak whether Stone is the spy or not, and he has four hours to give President Kennedy a decision on whether to place a blockade around Cuba or not. Mansky is not sure whom to trust, as Agent White did not tell Novak about the scar on Gift’s hand either.

Novak tells Mansky that the cork soaked in Stone’s blood says the nuclear weapons are ready; the second one Gift suggests the Soviets are bluffing. President Kennedy wants to communicate with Mansky by secure telegram, who wonders whether Gift is not on the American’s side at all. Explaining his reasoning by using a riddle, Mansky passes a message to the President, and Kennedy announces a blockade of ships to Cuba containing offensive material. Mansky tells Novak to thank Gift.

General Krutov and the Soviets find the dead bodies in the lobby toilet, and he discovers Mansky’s secret is alcohol, realizing that Slega must have befriended Mansky. Novak tells Mansky that Rakirovka ("castling") is a code word for imminent danger. Krutov realises with Kennedy’s announcement that the Soviets have lost this battle, and orders a search for the spy in their midst, and for Slega to be summoned to him, who he tortures, as he knows Slega put Mansky in the room with the secret passage, and is sympathetic to America.

At the fifth and deciding game, Mansky sees Gift outside in the lobby. A man in Soviet uniform is then seen exiting the sewers; this is actually Mansky, whilst Gift uses Slega's red book to leave the quarantined hotel in Mansky’s clothes. Novak rushes into the alley and stops Krutov from killing Mansky as he is protected by diplomatic immunity. Mansky forfeits the final game, so Gavrylov wins the tournament.

When Novak flies Mansky back to the USA, he is accused of having humiliated the country, despite his secretly preventing a nuclear war. Novak tells him he's a citizen hero and will be looked after, hands him a hip flask and exits the car. Gift gets in and gives him Slega’s red book, as he was killed. Although Novak wants to take care of them, Mansky insists he wants no part of it.

Talks between the US and the Soviet Union ultimately result in mutual deescalation. Later nuclear arms control agreements such as the INF Treaty and assistance with Eastern Bloc nuclear disarmament after the Revolutions of 1989.

However, in the epilogue, in 2019 Donald Trump and Vladimir Putin announce the suspension of the INF treaty and will develop new intermediate-range ballistic missiles.

== Cast ==
- Bill Pullman as Joshua Mansky, an alcoholic, professional chess player who is kidnapped to play a chess game and save the world from nuclear war.
- Lotte Verbeek as Agent Stone, an American agent who helps kidnap Mansky.
- James Bloor as Agent White, another American agent who helps kidnap Mansky.
- Robert Więckiewicz as Alfred, director of the Palace of Culture and Science and former WWII Polish Resistance hero, who befriends Mansky.
- Aleksei Serebryakov as General Krutov
- Corey Johnson as Donald Novak, another American agent.
- Nicholas Farrell as Griswald Moran
- Yevgeny Sidikhin as Alexander Gavrylov Mansky's Russian opponent in the chess game.

== Production ==
Filming took place from February to April 2018 in Warsaw. William Hurt, originally cast as Joshua Mansky, suffered an accident while returning from the film set to his apartment, just a few days into shooting, and was replaced by Bill Pullman.

The Coldest Game was the last film produced by Piotr Woźniak-Starak, as the 39 year old died shortly before the premiere. His death was ruled an accident. The cause of death was head trauma caused by a "sharp-edged tool", and it was claimed that the movie producer fell off his boat into a lake and had his head crushed by the propeller of his own boat. His cell phone remained on the boat. A 27-year-old woman who was also on the boat survived, and the movie producer's bodyguard reportedly attempted suicide soon after.

== Release ==
The film premiered on September 18, 2019 at the 44th Polish Film Festival to positive critics' reviews and was released in Polish theaters on November 8, 2019.

The international release was planned for early 2020.

It was released globally via streaming on February 8, 2020 through Netflix for five years before its removal in February 2025.

=== Critical response ===
Writing for the Chicago Reader, Jamie Ludwig said: "You'd expect a film that involves espionage and a high-stakes chess tournament during the height of the Cold War to leave you on the edge of your seat. But then there's The Coldest Game. Bill Pullman (who stepped into the lead role after the original actor William Hurt was injured just before production began) gives a fantastic performance as Professor Joshua Mansky... kidnapped by government agents and brought to Warsaw to compete against the Russians at chess after their first pick was murdered. However, Pullman alone can't make up for a premise that never completely gels, immemorable characters (Robert Więckiewicz as the Palace of Culture and Science director is a welcome exception), and loads of cliches. A few moments of dark humor beg to transform the film into a Vonnegut-type satire - it might have been better served had it been steered in that direction."

In a 2 stars out of 4 review, Roger Moore from Movie Nation wrote: "I'm a sucker for a good Cold War thriller. A middling one? Yeah, I'll sit through one of those, too. The Coldest Game falls in the latter category... The whole affair - again, fictional - is a jumble of U-2 flights and intrigues, "quiet" rooms (bugs are everywhere) and booze. Pullman keeps up with it all, but he lost me here and there. But the Mid-Century Soviet fashion, furniture and design is properly gloomy... The performances are solid even when the story is at its most convoluted. And there are third act twists that atone for some of what's lacking in the first two."

Demetrios Matheou from the Screen Daily wrote: "This Cold War thriller [...] features a fruity premise and respectable talent on either side of the camera [...] And yet the end result of what is a clearly enthusiastic enterprise is remarkably average." He noted that the potential of a movie combining "spy intrigue, the historical crisis and the renowned temperament of the chess elite", obviously evoking the Fischer-Spassky match, was wasted. He had some praise for Pullman and Więckiewicz's performances and found the scenes depicting the pair's drunk escapade "effective", but also stated the chess matches were "a botched business, presented with no logic or tension". "A clunky script and endemic hyperactivity in all departments results in the kind of film that is more guilty pleasure than edge-of-seat thriller".

John Serba, writing for the Decider, gave the movie a negative review, centering his criticism on Pullman's character, which he considered cartoonish and hammy. "A couple of the twists [...] are pretty good. The movie is reasonably strong down the stretch as it meets but doesn't surpass expectations of its genre. It's slickly produced in the sense that it has the clean, digital look of a production with a low budget that's trying to look expensive. It's fine. But the movie hinges on Pullman", whose "characterization of a hopeless boozer is so far over the top, it makes Charles Bukowski look like Ned Flanders. His character as written is thin-shaved lunch meat, and he just stacks up the ham."

Common Sense Media, which rates movies based on their family-friendliness, gave the movie 1 out of 5 stars because of high amounts of violence (4/5), language (4/5) and drinking, drugs and smoking (5/5).

Based on these five reviews, the film holds an approval rating of 0% on review aggregator Rotten Tomatoes, with an average rating of 3.5/10.

== Relationship to real events ==
=== Cuban Missile Crisis ===
An important question in the movie is whether the Soviets already have nuclear warheads in Cuba, or are yet to ship them to Cuba. As told by Soviet general Gribkov in 1992 (and repeated in the 2003 book Wilson's Ghost by McNamara & Blight), Soviet forces in Cuba at that point did have nuclear warheads there: 162 of them, including at least 90 tactical nuclear warheads; these warheads were just 90 miles from US shores. Furthermore, on October 26, 1962, the warheads were moved from their storage sites to positions closer to their delivery vehicles (missiles), to be launched in case of American invasion. According to McNamara, the Americans did not believe Soviet warheads were already in Cuba; if both Gribkov and McNamara are telling the truth, then the Americans decided on the course of action while not knowing how real the threat was.

=== The last vodka ===
The method of killing shown in the movie, dubbed "the last vodka" in the movie - injecting alcohol directly into the victim's bloodstream to fake accidental death from overdrinking - has long been alleged to be used by former communist secret service operatives in Poland to eliminate opponents and witnesses (or to perform example killings to scare others into silence). These allegations came mainly from anti-communists, including members of the opposition from the times when Poland was a one-party authoritarian communist state. A notable example is Sylwester Zych, a priest whom the Milicja Obywatelska blamed for the death of one of their own. In 1989, S. Zych died, officially from alcohol poisoning, but surprisingly the concentration of alcohol in one of his arms was much higher than elsewhere in his body, suggesting the alcohol was injected in the arm, not taken orally.

== See also ==
- A Beautiful Mind
- Polish People's Republic
- Cold War
