= Maciej Pieprzyca =

Polish film director and screenwriter (born 1964)

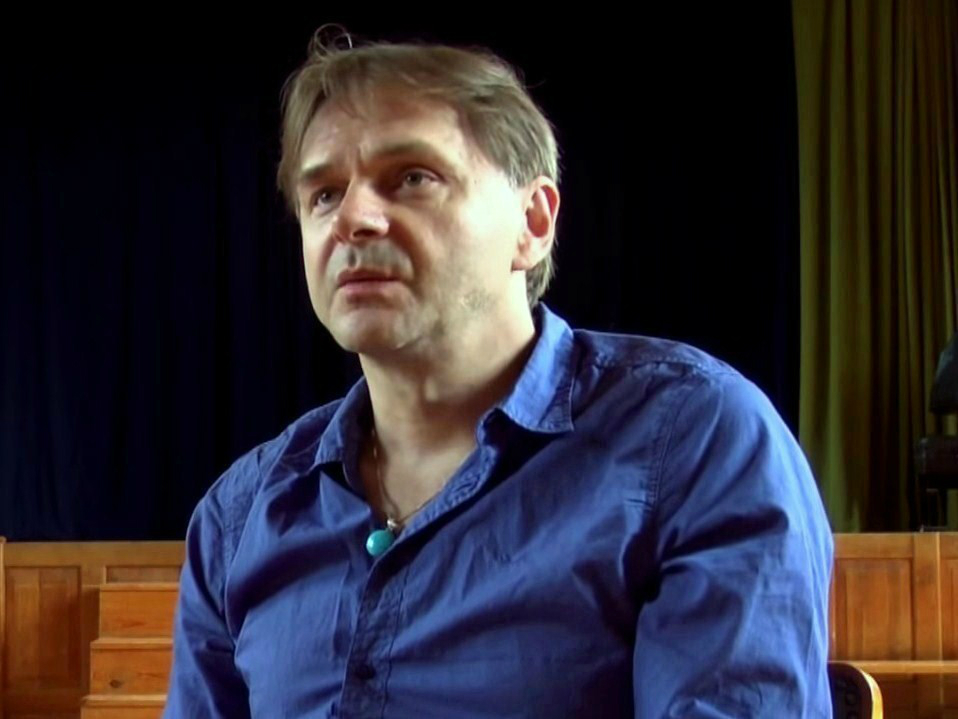
- Maciej Pieprzyca in 2012
- Born: 5 May 1964 (age 62)
- Citizenship: Polish
- Occupations: Film director, screenwriter, academic teacher

Maciej Pieprzyca (born 5 May 1964) is a film director, screenwriter and academic teacher.

== Filmography ==
- Inna (1993, short documentary), director, screenwriter
- Przez nokaut (1995, documentary), director, screenwriter
- Zostanie legenda (1998, documentary), director, screenwriter
- Jestem mordercą... (1998, documentary), director, screenwriter
- Inferno (2001), director, screenwriter
- Drzazgi (2008), director and screenwriter
- Life Feels Good (2013), director and screenwriter
- I'm a Killer (2016), director and screenwriter
- Kruk. Szepty słychać po zmroku (2018, TV series), director
- Ikar. Legenda Mietka Kosza (2019), director and screenwriter
- Kruk. Czorny woron nie śpi (2021, TV series)
- Kruk. Jak tu cicho (2022, TV series)
- Go Ahead, Brother (2024, TV series), director
- Lead Children (2026, TV series), director

== Awards ==
- Award for Directorial Debut at the Polish Film Festival for Drzazgi (2008)
- Silver Lions at the Polish Film Festival for Life Feels Good (2013)
- Polish Film Award for best screenplay for Life Feels Good (2014)
