= Beksiński. Wizje życia i śmierci =

2021 book by Dorota Szomko–Osękowska

- Author: Dorota Szomko–Osękowska
- Language: Polish
- Subject: Zdzisław Beksiński
- Publisher: Wydawnictwo BoSz
- Publication date: 10 September 2021
- Publication place: Poland
- Pages: 176
- ISBN: 978-83-7576-776-6

Beksiński. Wizje życia i śmierci (lit. 'Beksiński: Visions of Life and Death') is a book about the Polish painter, photographer and sculptor Zdzisław Beksiński. It was written by Dorota Szomko–Osękowska and published by Wydawnictwo BoSz in 2021. It contains 90 of Beksiński's pictures and examines his works through their engagement with existential themes of despair, death and the search for meaning, which the author argues form a consistent line throughout the artist's otherwise disparate phases.

== See also ==
- The Last Family, a 2016 film about Beksiński
