= Łukasz Kośmicki =

Polish filmmaker (born 1968)

- Born: September 9, 1968 (age 57); Szamotuły, Poland
- Education: National Film School in Łódź
- Occupations: cinematographer, screenwriter, film director
- Years active: 1995-present

Łukasz Kośmicki (born September 9, 1968) is a Polish cinematographer, screenwriter and director, known for Dom zły (The Dark House) and The Coldest Game.

Kośmicki received the Special Award at the 2019 Polish Film Festival for the spy film The Coldest Game, described as "exquisitely made genre cinema". The film was picked up by Netflix and is distributed internationally.

== Career ==
Kośmicki's debut as a cinematographer was with Gry uliczne. He mentions how he tried to make that film "MTV-like" to distinguish it from typical films about the Communist era (he said the idea came from Krzysztof Krauze). However, in the case of Poznań '56, he made the visuals black and white and very "classic", in the spirit of the European cinema of the 1960s.

His directorial debut came with The Coldest Game (2019).

== Film ==
=== Director ===
- The Coldest Game (2019); also screenwriter
- Queen (2022)

=== Screenwriter ===
- Dom zły (The Dark House) (2009)

=== Cinematographer ===
- Battle of Warsaw 1920 (2011) - second unit; also directorial cooperation
- Haker (2002)
- Sezon na leszcza (2000)
- Billboard (1998)
- Gniew (1998)
- Poznań '56 (1996)
- Gry uliczne (1996)

== Documentaries ==
- W sercu ukrył miasto (1999) - cinematographer
- Stan zapalny (1997) - cinematographer
- Departament IV (1996) - cinematographer

== Television ==
- Diagnoza (2018-2019) - director
- Druga szansa (2016) - director
- Przepis na życie (2011-2013) - director
- Rodzinka.pl (2011-2012) - director
- W roli Boga (2010) - cinematographer
- Wieczór z lalką (1997) - cinematographer
- Drugie zabicie psa (1996) - cinematographer
- Król Mięsopust (1995) - cinematographer

== Other works ==
Kośmicki has also directed TV commercials and worked as a director and/or cinematographer on various short films.
