= Marzena Broda =

Polish poet and novelist

Marzena Broda (born 27 February 1965 in Kraków) is a Polish poet, novelist, playwright and screenwriter.

== Selected bibliography ==
- Światło Przestrzeni (Oficyna Literacka, 1991)
- Cudzoziemszczyzna (A5, 1995)
- Nie dotykać Normana Hammera (Muza, 2004)
- Skaza (Dialog, 2004)
- Luka (Rebis, 2005)
- Prawo brzoskwinki do gromu (Instytut Mikołowski, 2008)
- Zwykłe rzeczy (Nisza, 2013)
