= Mieczysław Kosz =

Jazz pianist (1944–1973)

- Born: 10 February 1944; Antoniówka near Tomaszów Lubelski
- Died: 31 May 1973 (aged 29); Warsaw
- Occupation: Pianist

Mieczysław Kosz (10 February 1944 – 31 May 1973) was a jazz pianist.

== Biography ==
He lost his sight in childhood. He began his musical education at the Primary Music School for Blind Children in Kraków. In 1964, he graduated from the State Secondary Music School in Kraków, having studied piano. In 1967 he moved to Warsaw. Also in 1967 he made his first recordings for Polish Radio and debuted at the Jazz Jamboree festival.

== Film ==
A biographical film Icarus: The Legend of Mietek Kosz was released in 2019.

== Bibliography ==
- Kowal, R. (1995). Polski jazz. Wczesna historia i trzy biografie zamknięte. Komeda – Kosz – Seifert. Kraków: Akademia Muzyczna w Krakowie. ISBN 8390188856.
- Karpiński, Krzysztof (2019). Tyko smutek jest piękny. Opowieść o Mieczysławie Koszu. Kraków: Wydawnictwo Literackie. ISBN 978-83-08-06926-4.
