= Tell No One (2019 film) =

2019 documentary film about child sexual abuse in the Catholic Church in Poland

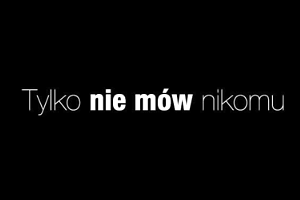
- Polish: Tylko nie mów nikomu
- Directed by: Tomasz Sekielski
- Written by: Tomasz Sekielski
- Screenplay by: Tomasz Sekielski
- Produced by: Marek Sekielski
- Cinematography: Adam Galica; Wojciech Jakubczak; Piotr Suzin
- Edited by: Dariusz Mandes
- Production company: Sekielski Brothers
- Distributed by: YouTube
- Release date: 11 May 2019
- Running time: 121 minutes
- Country: Poland
- Language: Polish

Tell No One (Polish: Tylko nie mów nikomu) is a 2019 Polish documentary directed by Tomasz Sekielski about child sexual abuse in the Catholic Church in Poland.

== About the film ==
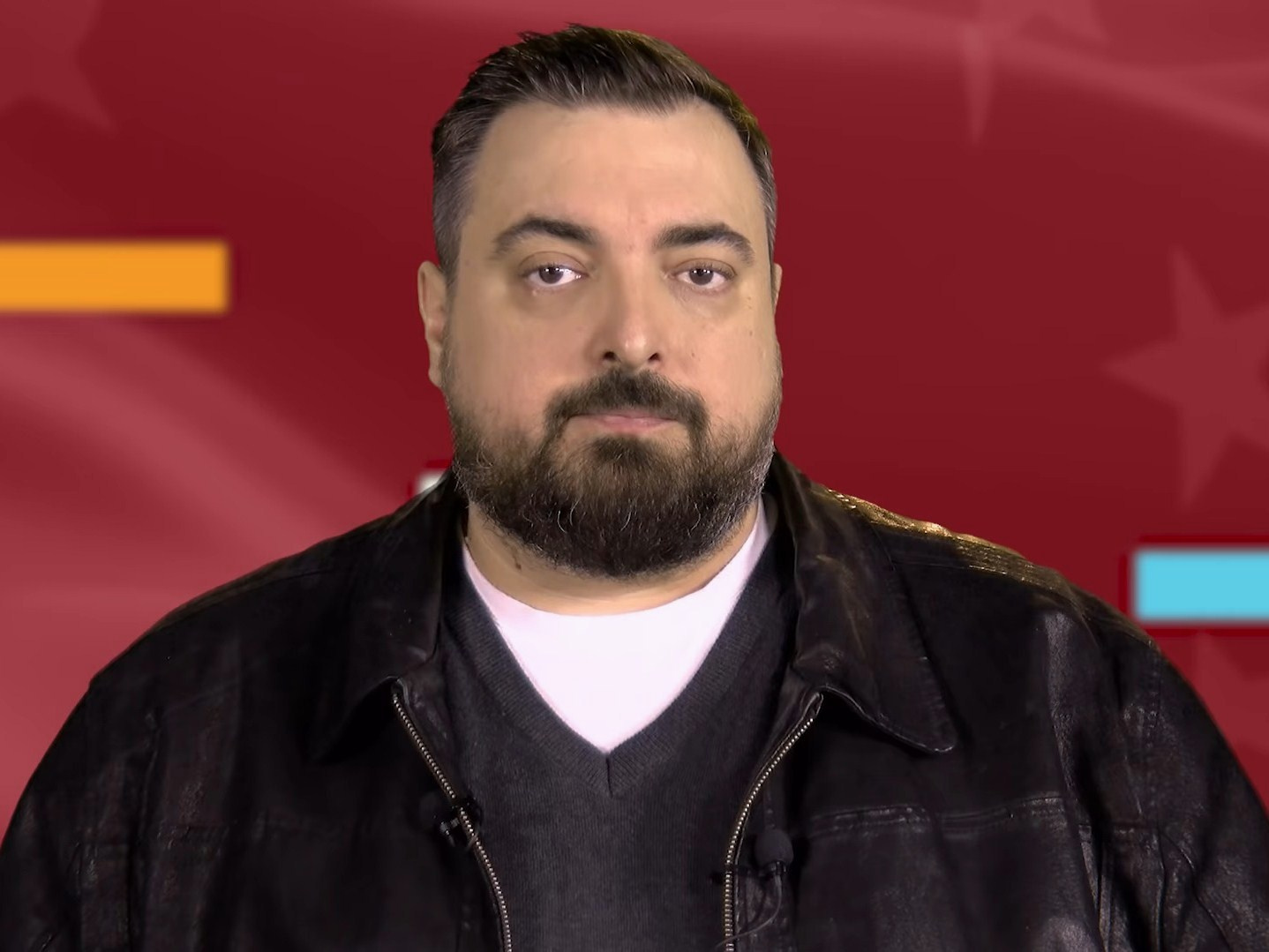
Tomasz Sekielski – director (2019)

The 121 minute long film is an independent production of Tomasz and Marek Sekielski and was fully financed by Internet fundraising on a Polish "Patronite" service. The first of the brothers is the author of the script and the director while the second is the producer. Adam Galica, Wojciech Jakubczak and Piotr Susin were responsible for videography, and Dariusz Mandes was the editor.

The film addresses the issue of responsibility of the Episcopal Conference of Poland for hiding pedophiles among priests from the law enforcement. It portrayed both new and old cases of the crimes. Accusations of pedophilia against Franciszek Cybula, the personal chaplain of the former President of Poland Lech Wałęsa and Eugeniusz Makulski, who took the initiative of building the Basilica of Our Lady of Licheń, were raised for the first time.

The authors invited several church dignitaries to participate, but the archbishops Wojciech Polak and Stanisław Gądecki refused and the cardinal Kazimierz Nycz, archbishop Sławoj Leszek Głódź and bishop Jan Tyrawa did not respond to the invitation.

== Distribution ==
The film was posted on YouTube on 11 May 2019 and received over a million views in the first 5.5 hours, which is a new record for Polish YouTube. By 13 May afternoon, over it had been viewed more than 8.1 million times. After around 55 hours the number of views exceeded 10 million. Within six days, the film was viewed over 19 million times.

Because of the high reception of the document, the authors started talks with Netflix in order to make and international distribution there and announced the sequel to the film. They did not rule out creating a whole documentary series on the subject.

Tomasz Sekielski announced he will grant a free license to broadcast the film on national television, in order to reach as many viewers as possible. On 16 May the movie was broadcast on WP channel. The second Polish TV channel to broadcast it was TVN.

== Receptions and reactions ==
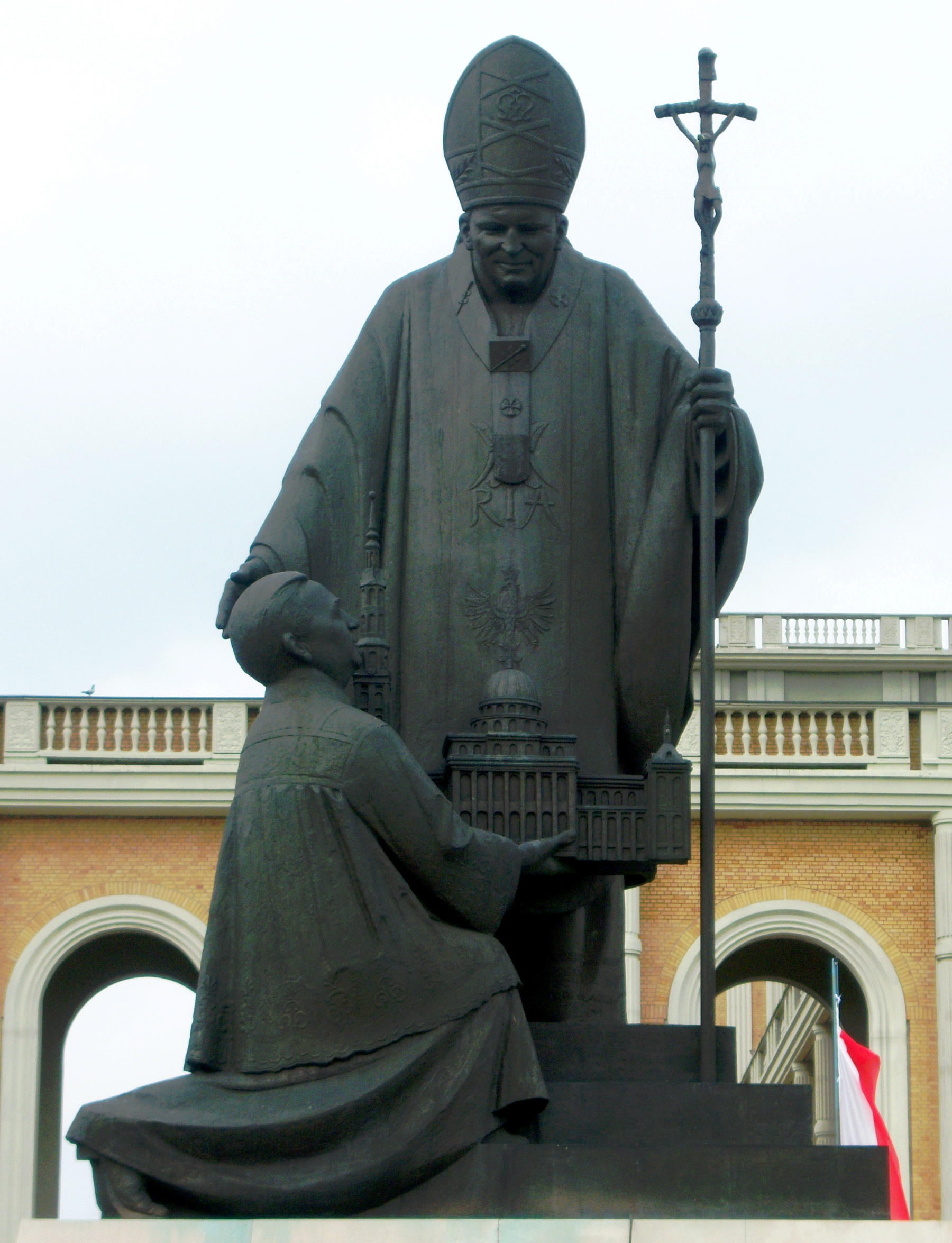
A monument depicting Pope John Paul II with priest Eugeniusz Makulski, which was removed in June 2019

Both the announcement of the making of the film and its premiere was widely commented in the Polish media and social networking sites, as well as abroad.

Within a few hours of the publication of the documentary, several of the Polish church dignitaries issued the statements. Primate Wojciech Polak wrote: "I am deeply moved by what I saw in the film by Mr. Tomasz Siekelski", and the chairman of the Episcopal Conference of Poland archbishop Stanisław Gądecki said: "With emotion and sadness I watched Mr. Sekielski film today, for which I would like to thank the director". The documentary was mentioned also by other priests, many journalists and politicians. Archbishop Sławoj Leszek Głódź, who was one of the hierarchs concealing the pedophilia cases, according to authors, the next day after the premiere told the Fakty TVN journalist that he does not watch baloney. Three days later he apologized for his words. Cardinal Kazimierz Nycz said it was his mistake that he did not agree to participate in the documentary and apologised for this.

Primate Wojciech Polak noted during an interview in Radio ZET that he does not see Tell No One as an attack on the Church. Tadeusz Rydzyk commented the film saying: "Is it fair; is it caring? It's a fight against the Church calculated for its destruction." He said that the drama of the victims was turned into a "pedophilia industry" and that "we already had a club of antisemitism, Nazism, nationalism, fascism and now a club of pedophilia was formed. Hatred stands behind all this."

After its broadcast, priest Dariusz Olejniczak, shown in the documentary, asked Pope Francis to be moved to a secular state, because of breaking the court ban.

In response to the film, the representatives of the Marian Order issued a statement where they stated that all reported cases pertaining Eugeniusz Makulski were given to the Holy See and the priest was banned from any pastoral activity. The monument in Licheń depicting Pope John Paul II with Eugeniusz Makulski was covered by white cloth in May 2019. The next month, the monument was removed, though plans were still made to bring it back after Makulski's statue was successfully taken off.

The diocesan curia in Kielce issued a statement regarding priest Jan A., who had been molesting a seven-year-old girl, among others. They informed that the full documentation of the case was sent to the Holy See. Jan A. is currently a retired presbyter of the Kielce diocese and he is threatened by expulsion from the priesthood. They note that from the legal point of both church and state law the case has expired. The diocesan curia in Bydgoszcz informed that priest Paweł Kania, who also appeared in the documentary, was removed from clerical state.

The National Public Prosecutor's Office in Poland informed that they have established a team of prosecutors, whose task is to analyze the cases presented in the documentary.

The Polish organisation Press Club Polska awarded Marek and Tomasz Sekielski with a special prize for creating a documentary about one of the most shocking phenomena, which is pedophilia among priests.
