= Tomasz Sekielski =

Polish journalist (born 1974)

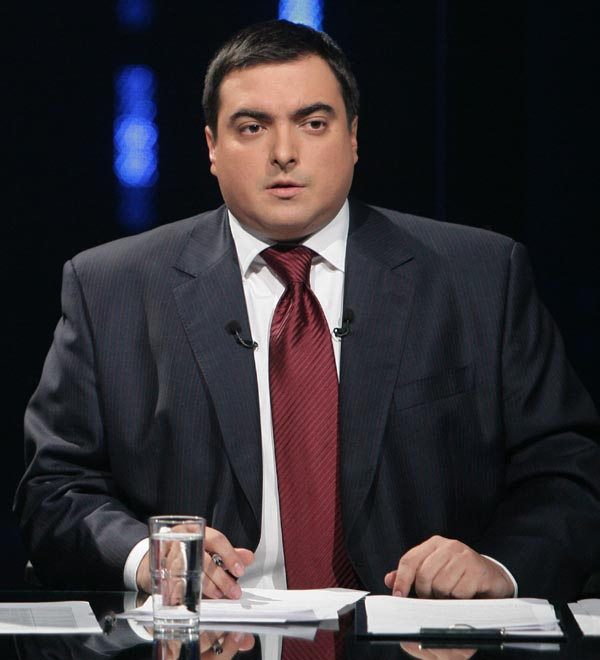
- Born: January 24, 1974; Bydgoszcz
- Citizenship: Polish
- Occupation: journalist

Tomasz Sekielski (born January 24, 1974) is a Polish journalist and novelist, author of reportages and documentary films, including Tell No One, a 2019 documentary about child sexual abuse in the Catholic Church in Poland, that sparked a nationwide discussion.

Earlier, together with Andrzej Morozowski, he was a co-host of the talk show Teraz my! on TVN. In 2006 a journalist investigation led by Sekielski and Morozowski revealed a proposal involving political corruption of prominent politicians of the ruling Samoobrona party made to another MP, that resulted in a political crisis in Poland.

Throughout his professional career, he was affiliated with the editorial boards of TVN, TVN24, TVP1, TVP Info, Wprost, Nowa TV, Wirtualna Polska and Onet. In early 2018, he launched his independent channel on YouTube.

== Life and work ==
His father, Krzysztof Sekielski was a teacher of Russian language and worked in a high school in Bydgoszcz. Tomasz Sekielski was born in Bydgoszcz in 1974. He has a younger brother, Marek (born 1978).

He graduated from technikum, and first worked in the Catholic Radio VOX in Bydgoszcz. Then he was employed successively in Radio Wawa and Radio dla Ciebie.

From 1997 until 2006 he was a reporter of Fakty TVN, covering, among others the Kosovo War, the sinking of the Kursk ship near Murmansk and the work of the investigative commission on the Rywin affair. He also hosted Friday's edition of Kropka nad i show and was the creator and the host of another show, 100 dni premiera.

From November 2003, together with Andrzej Morozowski, he hosted Kuluary and Prześwietlenie show on TVN24. In autumn 2005, Sekielski and Morozowski moved to TVN and, until July 2010, they ran a news talk show Teraz my!, later followed-up by Teraz my! Overtime broadcast on TVN24.

In 2006, Sekielski and Morozwoski, using a hidden camera, recorded talks between MP Renata Beger and several prominent politicians of Samoobrona party, that was in the governing coalition in Poland at the time. The topic of the talks was the support which Beger was to give Law and Justice in exchange for political benefits. In September 2006, the revealed tapes resulted in a political crisis in Poland, that was later referred to as the tape scandal.

From November 4, 2006, until January 25, 2008, Sekielski hosted his own show on TVN24, presenting the weekend releases of the Magazyn 24 godziny (The 24 Hours Magazine). From January 2011 until April 2012, he ran the Czarno na białym show on TVN24. In April 2012, after almost 15 years of work, he left TVN.

From October 2012 until January 2015 he ran weekly morning broadcasts on Radio Tok FM; first on Mondays, then on Wednesdays.

From January 2013 until June 2016, he ran the Po prostu show on TVP1. From January until August 2014, he hosted the Woronicza 17 show on TVP Info.

In 2010–2011 and in 2013 he cooperated with the Wprost weekly.

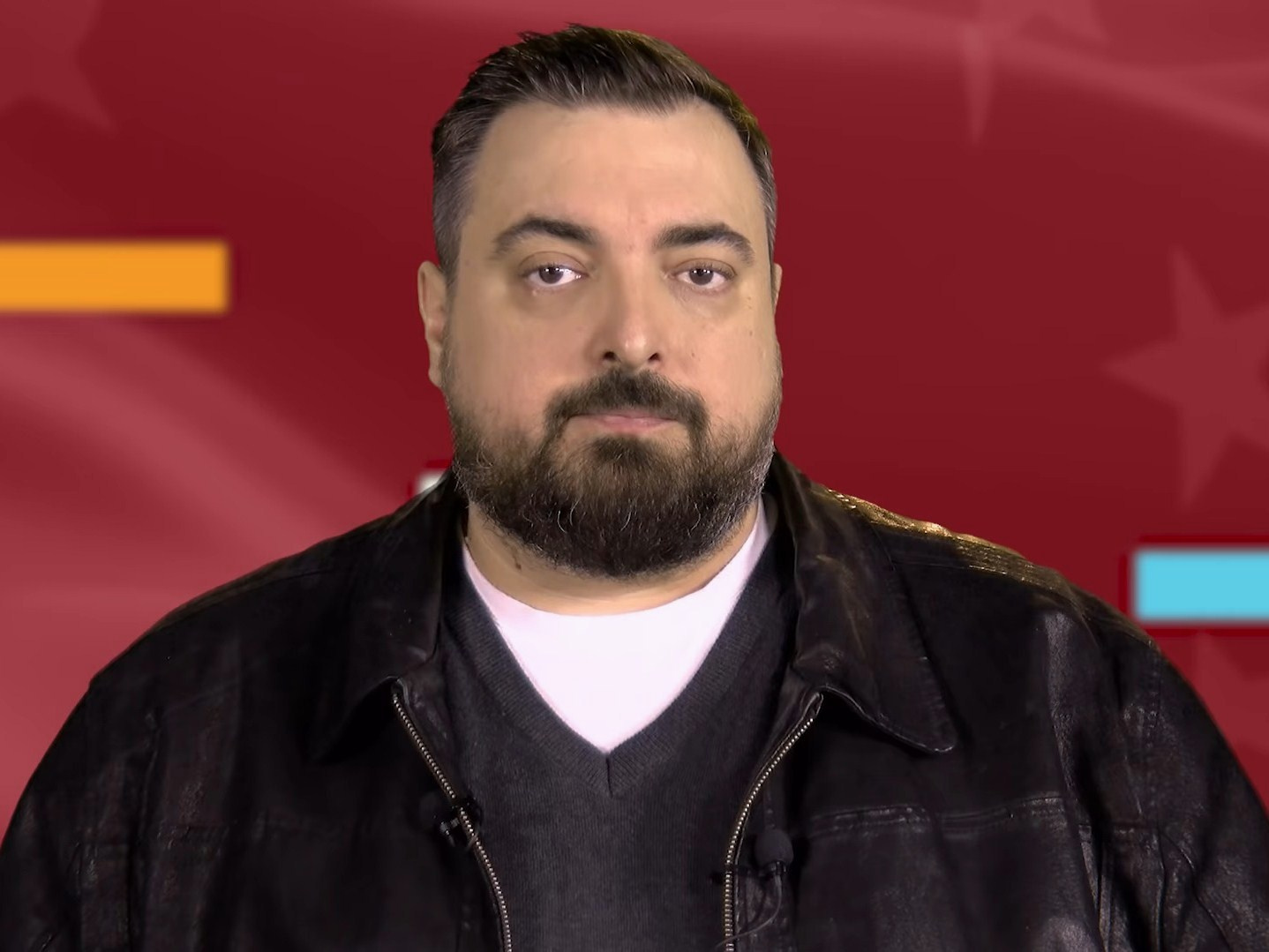
Sekielski in May 2019, shortly after Tell No One was released online

From November 2016 until October 2017, he ran the Teraz ja! show on Nowa TV. In early 2018, he launched his channel on YouTube. On April 19, 2018, he started cooperation with Wirtualna Polska, where he ran his video blog. On November 28, 2018, he became one of the hosts of the Onet Morning program, broadcast on Onet.pl.

On May 11, 2019, Sekielski published his documentary film Tell No One (Tylko nie mów nikomu) on YouTube. The film dealt with child sexual abuse in the Catholic Church in Poland and sparked a nationwide discussion, receiving more than 20 million views within the first 10 days of online screening. A few hours after the premiere, the Primate of Poland Wojciech Polak and Archbishop Stanisław Gądecki issued their statements in the case. A TV broadcast of the film followed up a few days later on TVN.

Since July 1, 2022, Sekielski is the editor-in-chief of the news magazine Newsweek Polska.

Tomasz Sekielski has a wife, Anna, and two children: daughter Julia and son Łukasz.

== Accolades ==
In 2005, he received the Prize for the best TV parliamentary journalist from the Polish Parliamentarians' Association.

In 2006, together with Andrzej Morozowski and Andrzej Turski, he was awarded the Wiktor Award in the journalist category; and – also with Morozowski – with the Andrzej Woyciechowski Award, and the Journalist of the Year Grand Press Award.

Together with Andrzej Morozowski, he also received the Telekamery Award in 2007 and 2008.

In 2010, he received the ProwokaTOR Award in the MediaTory plebiscite.

In May 2019, he received the Special Award of the Press Club Poland for the documentary film Tell No One. He shared the Award with his brother Marek Sekielski, the co-producer of the film.

== Filmography ==
- 2010: Puppet Rulers (Polish: Władcy marionetek, documentary film), writer and director
- 2019: Tell No One (Polish: Tylko nie mów nikomu, documentary film), writer and director
- 2020: Playing Hide and Seek (Polish: Zabawa w chowanego, documentary film), writer and director

== Novels ==
- 2012: Sejf (detective story)
- 2013: Obraz kontrolny (the continuation of Sejf)
- 2014: Sejf 3. Gniazdo kruka (the continuation of Sejf and Obraz kontrolny)
- 2016: Zapach Suszy. Susza I (thriller)
- 2017: Smak Suszy. Susza II (thriller)
