= Zdzisław Beksiński =

Polish artist (1929–2005)

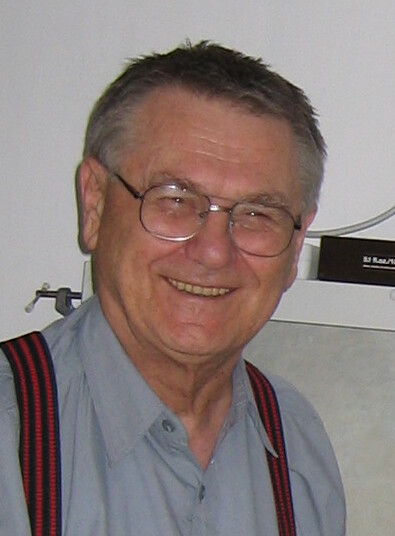
- Beksiński in 2003
- Born: 24 February 1929; Sanok, Poland
- Died: 21 February 2005 (aged 75); Warsaw, Poland
- Known for: Painting, sculpture, photography
- Awards: Order of Polonia Restituta

Zdzisław Beksiński (pronounced [ˈzd͡ʑiswaf bɛkˈɕiɲskʲi]; 24 February 1929 – 21 February 2005) was a Polish painter, photographer, and sculptor.

Beksiński made his paintings and drawings in what he called either a Baroque or a Gothic manner. His creations were made mainly in two periods. The first period of work is generally considered to contain expressionistic colour, with a strong style of "utopian realism" and surreal architecture. The second period contained more abstract style, with the main features of formalism.

Beksiński was stabbed to death at his Warsaw apartment on 21 February 2005, by a 19-year-old acquaintance from Wołomin, reportedly because Beksiński refused to lend him money.

== Life ==
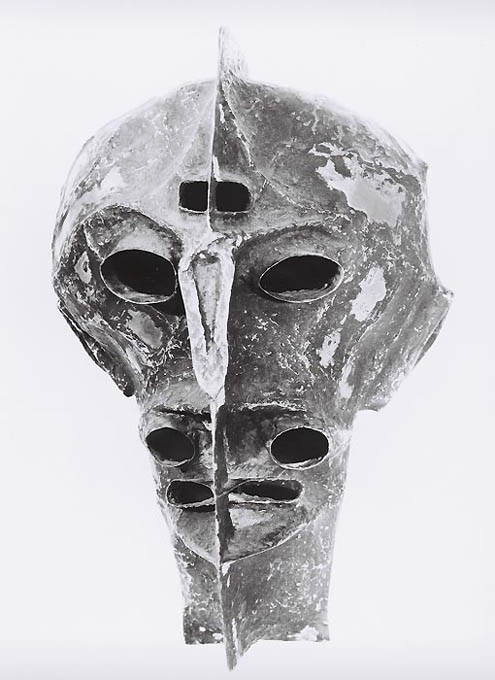
Sculpture, 1960

Zdzisław Beksiński was born in Sanok, southern Poland. He studied architecture at Kraków Polytechnic in 1947, finishing his studies in 1952. He returned to Sanok in 1955, where he found work supervising construction sites and designing buses, but discovered that he did not enjoy it. During this period, he had an interest in montage photography, sculpting, and painting. When he first started sculpting, he often used his construction site materials for his medium. His early photography was a precursor to his later paintings, often depicting peculiar wrinkles, desolate landscapes, and still-life faces on rough surfaces. His paintings often depict anxiety, such as torn doll faces, or faces erased or obscured by bandages wrapped around the portrait. His main focus was on abstract painting, and his works in the 1960s were inspired by surrealism.

=== Painting and drawing ===
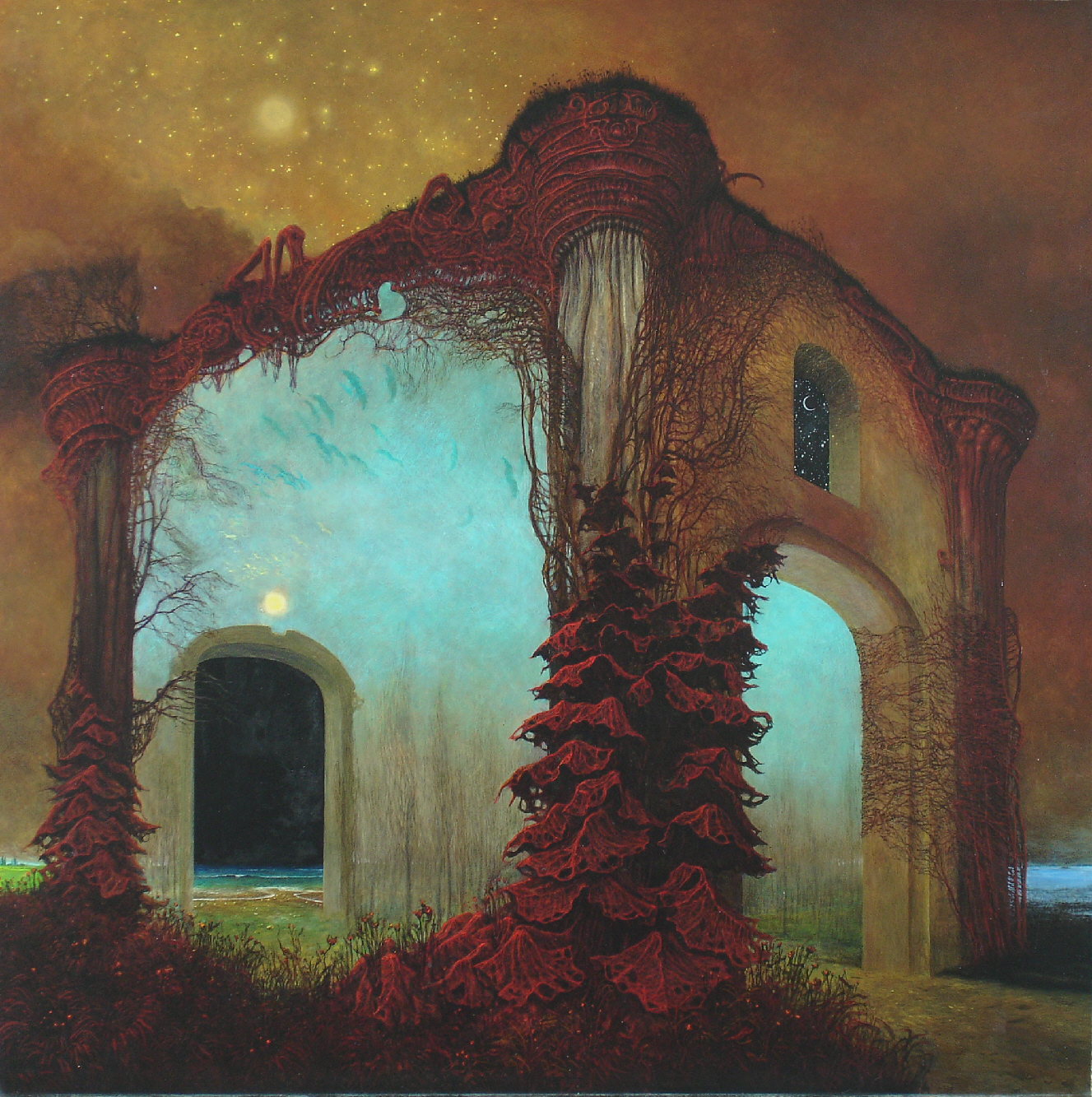
Oil painting, 1978

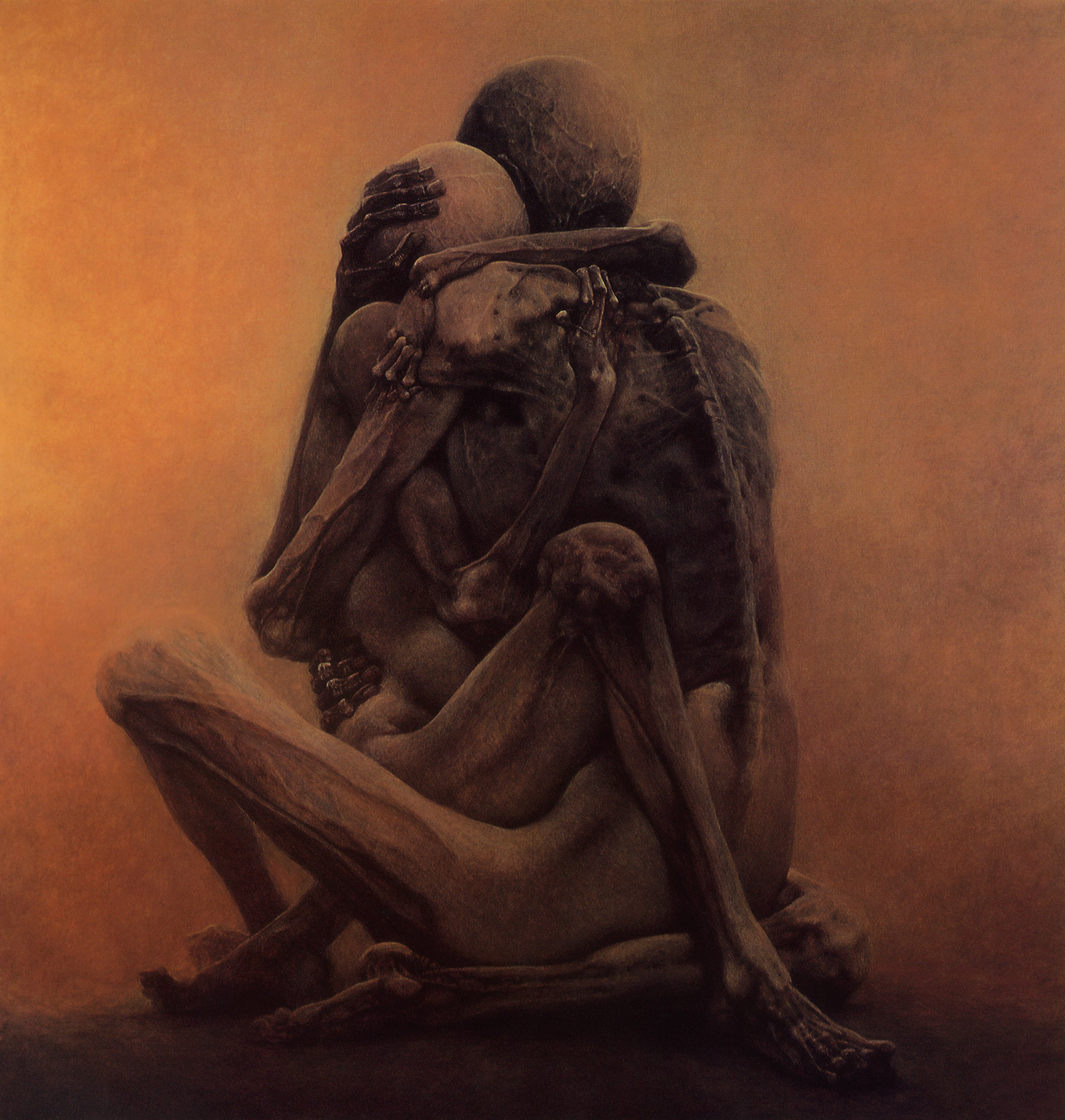
Oil painting, 1984

Beksiński had no formal training as an artist. He was a graduate of the Faculty of Architecture at the Kraków Polytechnic, receiving an MSc in 1952. His paintings were mainly created using oil paint on hardboard panels that he personally prepared, although he also experimented with acrylic paints. Beksiński listened to classical music while painting.

=== Fantastic Realism ===
An exhibition of Beksiński's works organized by Janusz Bogucki in Warsaw in 1964 was his first major success.

Beksiński soon became the leading figure in contemporary Polish art. In the late 1960s, Beksiński entered what he called his "fantastic period," which lasted into the mid-1980s. This is his best-known period, during which he created disturbing images, showing gloomy, nightmarish environments with detailed scenes of death, decay, landscapes filled with skeletons, deformed figures, and deserts. At the time, Beksiński said, "I wish to paint in such a manner as if I were photographing dreams."

Despite the grim subjects, Beksiński claimed some of his works were misunderstood; in his opinion, they were rather optimistic or even humorous. For the most part, Beksiński was adamant that even he did not know the meaning of his artworks and was uninterested in possible interpretations; in keeping with this notion, he refused to provide titles for any of his drawings or paintings. Before moving to Warsaw in 1977, he destroyed a selection of his works in his own backyard, without leaving any documentation concerning them.

=== Short stories ===
From 1963 to 1965, Beksiński wrote short stories. However, he was unhappy with the results and sealed them away, deciding to hone his skills in painting instead. They remained unpublished until after his death. In 2015, a collection of his short stories was published. The stories have an unfinished and chaotic nature; they vary from abstract onirist tales and philosophical self-reflections to metaphorical post-apocalyptic fiction and crime thriller stories. Beksiński's literary period is described as "short and intensive", as he wrote 40 short stories in fewer than two years, experimenting with form and narrative.

=== Later work ===
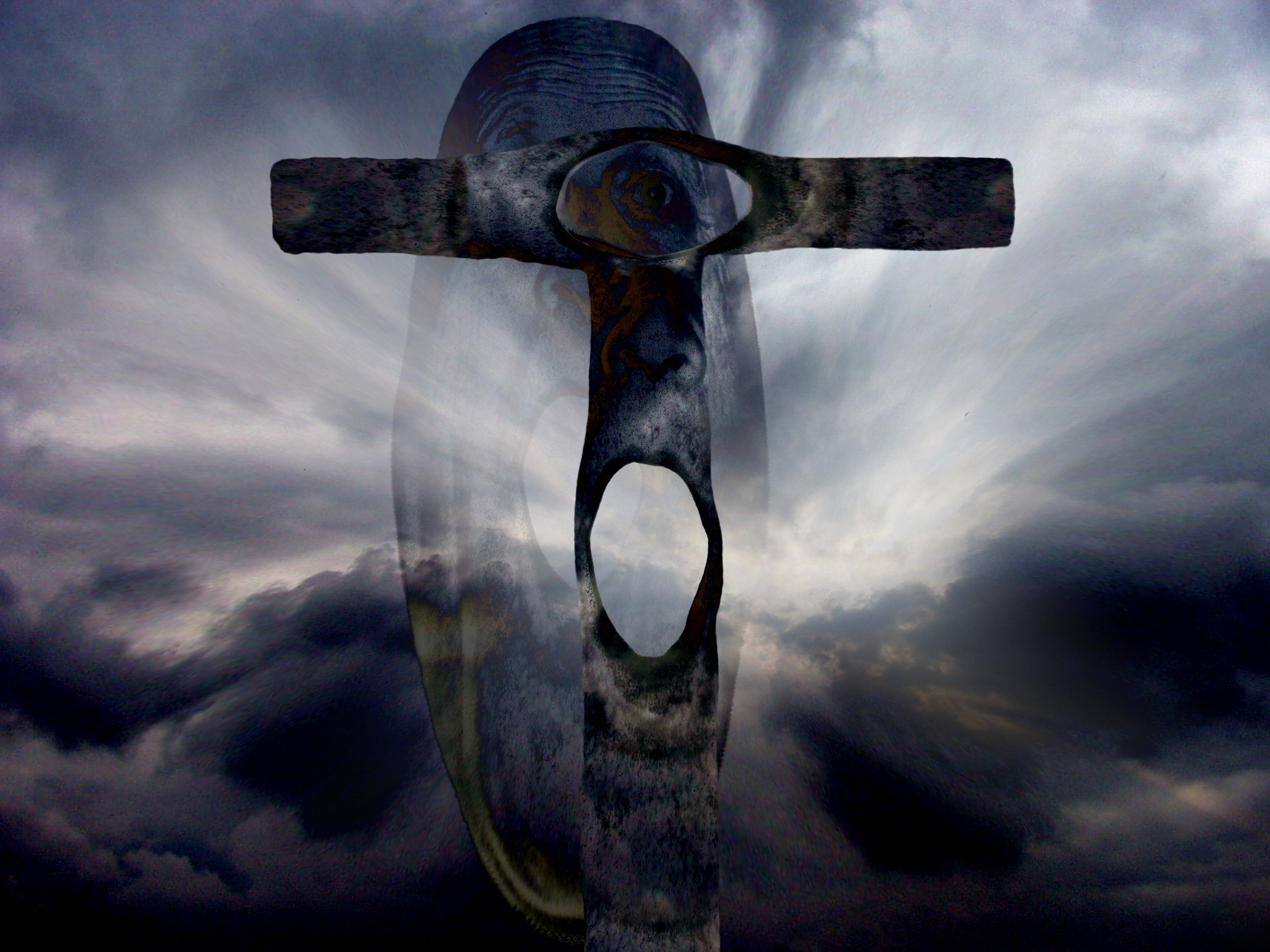
Digital photomontage, c. 2000

In the later part of the 1990s, he became interested in computers, the Internet, digital photography and photo manipulation, a medium that he focused on until his death.

== Later life and death ==
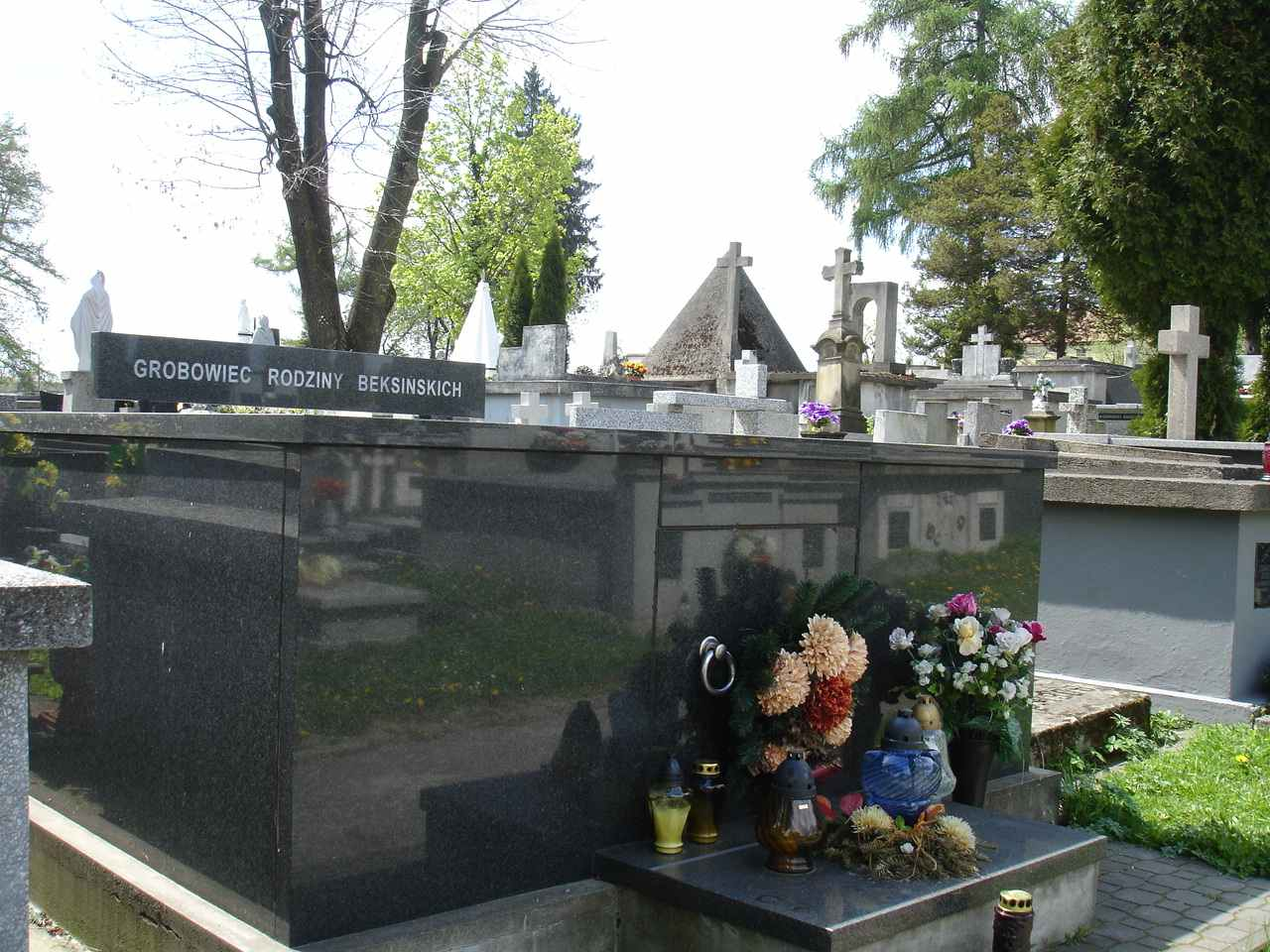
Beksiński's family vault in Sanok

Beksiński's wife, Zofia, died in 1998; a year later, on Christmas Eve 1999, his son Tomasz died by suicide by drug overdose. Beksiński discovered his son's body.

Beksiński was murdered in his flat in Warsaw on 21 February 2005 by Robert Kupiec, the teenage son of his long-time caretaker. Robert's cousin Łukasz was also involved in the murder. Robert and his cousin were arrested shortly after the crime. On 9 November 2006 Robert was sentenced by the Supreme Court of Warsaw to 25 years in prison, and Łukasz was sentenced to 5 years.

== Personality ==
Although Beksiński's art was often grim, he himself was known to be a pleasant person who took enjoyment from conversation and had a keen sense of humor. He was modest and somewhat shy, avoiding public events such as the openings of his own exhibitions. He credited music as his main source of inspiration. He claimed not to be much influenced by literature, cinema or the work of other painters, and almost never visited museums or exhibitions. Beksiński avoided concrete analysis of the content of his work, saying "I don't want to say or convey anything. I just paint what comes to my mind".

He had obsessive–compulsive disorder, which made him reluctant to travel; he referred to his condition as "neurotic diarrhea".

== Legacy ==
The town of Sanok, Poland, houses a museum dedicated to Beksiński. A Beksiński museum housing 50 paintings and 120 drawings from the Piotr Dmochowski collection (the biggest private collection of Beksiński's art) opened in 2006 in the City Art Gallery of Częstochowa, Poland and remained until 2021. On 18 May 2012 with the participation of Minister of Regional Development Elżbieta Bieńkowska and others took place ceremonial opening of the New Gallery of Zdzisław Beksiński in the rebuilt wing of Sanok castle. On 19 May 2012, The New Gallery opened for the public. A 'Beksiński cross', in the characteristic T-shape frequently employed by the artist, was installed for Burning Man to honor the artist's memory.

Beksiński and his family are portrayed in the 2016 drama film The Last Family directed by Jan P. Matuszyński. The role of Beksiński is played by Andrzej Seweryn.

He is the subject of the 2021 book Beksiński. Wizje życia i śmierci (lit. 'Beksiński: Visions of Life and Death') by Dorota Szomko–Osękowska, which focuses on the existential themes in his works.

In 2023, the online Zdzisław Beksiński Art Promotion Archive, an online collection of Beksiński's works, was created.

== See also ==
- List of Polish painters
- Mariusz Lewandowski (artist)

== Sources ==
- Cowan, J. (Ed.) 2006: The Fantastic Art of Beksiński – Zdzislaw Beksiński: 1929–2005, 3rd edn., Galerie Morpheus International, Las Vegas. ISBN 1-883398-38-X.
- Dmochowski, A. & P. 1991: Beksiński – Photographies, Dessins, Sculptures, Peintures, 2nd edn., API Publishing (Republic of Korea).
- Dmochowski, A. & P. 1991: Beksiński – Peintures et Dessins 1987–1991, 1st edn., API Publishing (Republic of Korea).
- Gazeta Wyborcza, an interview with Zdzisław Beksiński
- Kulakowska-Lis, J. (Ed.) 2005: Beksiński 1, 3rd edn.; with introduction by Tomasz Gryglewicz. Bosz Art, Poland. ISBN 83-87730-11-4.
- Kulakowska-Lis, J. (Ed.) 2005: Beksiński 2, 2nd edn.; with introduction by Wieslaw Banach. Bosz Art, Poland. ISBN 83-87730-42-4.
