= Tomasz Beksiński =

Polish radio presenter and music journalist

- Born: Tomasz Sylwester Beksiński; November 26, 1958; Sanok, Poland
- Died: December 24, 1999 (aged 41); Warsaw, Poland
- Occupations: Radio presenter, journalist, translator
- Years active: 1979-1999
- Parent: Zdzisław Beksiński

Tomasz Sylwester Beksiński (26 November 1958 – 24 December 1999) was a popular Polish radio presenter, music journalist and movie translator. He was the son of painter Zdzisław Beksiński.

== Early life ==
Beksiński was born in Sanok, Poland. From the age of 12 he was interested in music, especially rock music (progressive rock, gothic rock) and horror films. In one of his essays he wrote about how scared he was while watching his first horror movie, The Reptile, in 1970. He admitted it was the first and the last time he felt that way watching a horror film. For a year he studied English literature at the University of Silesia campus in Sosnowiec.

He studied English philology in Katowice.

== Career ==
=== Music journalism ===
In the late 1970s he became a music journalist and was one of the most charismatic Polish radio presenters. It was not a coincidence he chose such a career; he was known to be a music lover, who had an impressive collection of LP records.
He debuted on air in Marek Niedźwiecki's programme in 1982. At the beginning he worked together with Polskie Radio and presented programmes Romantycy muzyki rockowej, and Wieczór płytowy.

He also wrote feature articles and reviews for Tylko Rock and Magazyn muzyczny magazines. From 1998 he wrote a column Opowieści z Krypty in Tylko Rock magazine, where his features were published. He also wrote for Machina magazine.

=== Translation ===
Tomasz Beksiński was also an English-Polish translator. He translated most of the James Bond and Harry Callahan films and Monty Python's Flying Circus comedy sketches and many other films e.g. Wild at Heart, Silence of the Lambs, Apocalypse Now, Robin Hood: Prince of Thieves, Birdy, Die Hard, Don't Look Now, Frankenstein, Beyond the Poseidon Adventure, The Swarm, Someone's watching me!, Lethal Weapon, 1941, Pet Sematary, Reservoir Dogs, Lost Highway, Untouchables, Carrie, Dawn Of The Dead, Pumpkinhead, Hellraiser, The Reptile, Casablanca, Escape From New York, Once Upon a Time in America, Godfather 3, The Fury, The Doors, Casualties of War.

He also translated some lyrics of Marillion, Iron Maiden, King Crimson, Pink Floyd, The Doors, Joy Division and The Sisters of Mercy.

== Death ==
On 24 December 1999 Tomasz died by suicide.
