= Polish Academy Award for Best Supporting Actress =

Annual Polish film award

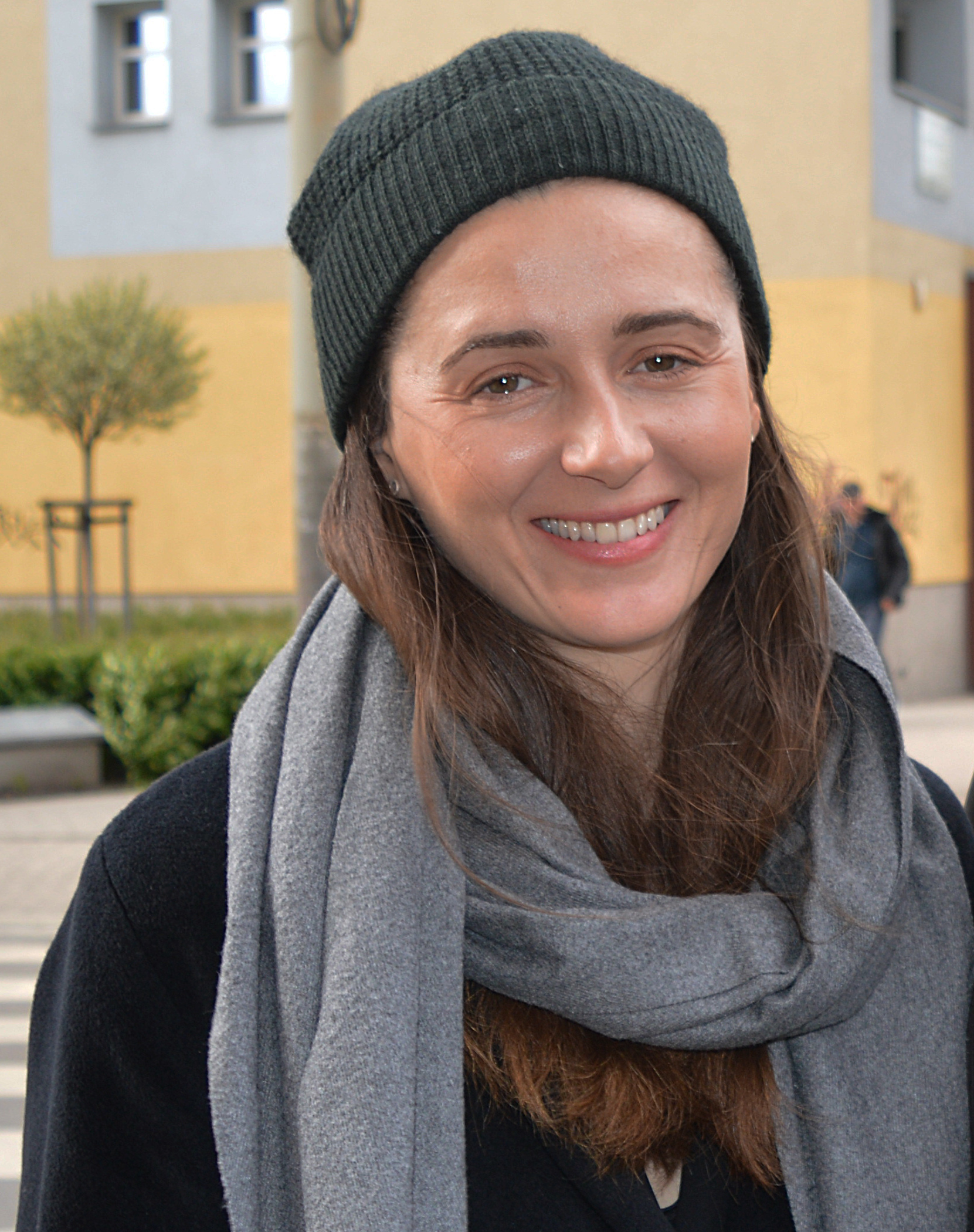
- 2024 recipient: Agnieszka Grochowska
- Awarded for: Best Performance by an Actress in a Supporting Role
- Presented by: Polish Film Academy
- First award: Ewa Wiśniewska; Ogniem i mieczem (1999)
- Currently held by: Agnieszka Grochowska; Kos (2024)

The Polish Academy Award for Best Supporting Actress is an annual award given to the best supporting actress in Polish movie.

== Winners and nominees ==
Year	Actress	Movie title	Role
2000	Ewa Wiśniewska	Ogniem i mieczem	Kurcewiczowa
2000	Stanisława Celińska	Fuks	Mrs. Poznańska
2000	Kinga Preis	Poniedziałek	Renata
2000	Danuta Szaflarska	Egzekutor	Old lady
2000	Danuta Szaflarska	Tydzień z życia mężczyzny	Adam's mother
2001	Krystyna Feldman	To ja, złodziej	Babcia "Jaja"
2001	Zofia Kucówna	Syzyfowe prace	"Przepiórzyca"
2001	Kinga Preis	Wrota Europy	Hala
2001	Katarzyna Figura	Zakochani	Edyta Bobicka
2001	Monika Krzywkowska	Życie jako śmiertelna choroba przenoszona drogą płciową	Hanka
2002	Stanisława Celińska	Pieniądze to nie wszystko	Mrs. Ala
2002	Olga Frycz	Boże skrawki	Marysia
2002	Olga Frycz	Weiser	Elka in 50s/ Rachela, Elka's daughter
2002	Małgorzata Rożniatowska	Cześć, Tereska	Terseka's mother
2003	Kinga Preis	Wtorek	Renata
2003	Janina Traczykówna	Dzień świra	Adaś's mother
2003	Maureen Lipman	Pianista	Szpilman's mother
2003	Beata Schimscheiner	Anioł w Krakowie	Ramona Talarek
2003	Agata Buzek	Zemsta	Klara Raputsiewiczówna
2004	Dominika Ostałowska	Warszawa	Wiktoria
2004	Małgorzata Foremniak	Zmruż oczy	mother of "Mała"
2004	Natalia Rybicka	Żurek	Iwonka Iwanek
2005	Iwona Bielska	Wesele	Eluśka Wojnarowa
2005	Dorota Kamińska	Pręgi	Tania's mother
2005	Kinga Preis	Symetria	Dawid's wife
2006	Małgorzata Braunek	Tulipany	Marianna
2006	Edyta Jungowska	Jestem	mother of "Kundel"
2006	Anna Dymna	Skazany na bluesa	Polowa
2007	Ewa Wencel	Plac Zbawiciela	Teresa Zielińska
2007	Jadwiga Jankowska-Cieślak	Co słonko widziało	Róża Świder
2007	Anna Romantowska	Statyści	Maria Narożna
2008	Danuta Stenka	Katyń	Róża
2008	Krystyna Tkacz	Parę osób, mały czas	Zosia
2008	Stanisława Calińska	Południe-Północ	Woman with cows
2009	Danuta Szaflarska	Ile waży koń trojański?	Stanisława Zwierzyńska
2009	Izabela Kuna	33 sceny z życia	Kaśka
2009	Małgorzata Hajewska-Krzysztofik	33 sceny z życia	Barbara Rostawicka
2010	Anna Polony	Rewers	Sabina's grandmother
2010	Krystyna Janda	Rewers	Irena Jankowska
2010	Sonia Bohosiewicz	Wojna polska-ruska	Natasza Blokus
2011	Stanisława Celińska	Joanna	Kamińska
2011	Kinga Preis	Joanna	Staszka Kopeć
2011	Magdalena Cielecka	Wenecja	Joanna
2012	Kinga Preis	W ciemności	Wanda Socha
2012	Kinga Preis	Róża	Amelia
2012	Roma Gąsiorowska	Sala samobójców	Sylwia
2013	Joanna Kulig	Sponsoring	Alicja
2013	Izabela Kuna	Drogówka	Ewa
2013	Sonia Bohosiewicz	Obława	Hanna Kondolewiczowa
2014	Anna Nehrebecka	Chce się żyć	Mrs. Jola
2014	Joanna Kulig	Nieulotne	Marta
2014	Marta Nieradkiewicz	Płynące wieżowce	Sylwia
2015	Kinga Preis	Pod Mocnym Aniołem	Mania
2015	Kinga Preis	Bogowie	Ewka's mother
2015	Karolina Gruszka	All About My Parents	Karolina
2016	Anna Dymna	Excentrycy, czyli po słonecznej stronie ulicy	Bayerowa
2016	Ewa Dałkowska	Body/Ciało	Prosecutor's friend
2016	Kinga Preis	Córki dancingu	Vocalist
2017	Agata Buzek	Niewinne	Sister Maria
2017	Agata Kulesza	Jestem mordercą	Lidia Kalicka
2017	Izabela Kuna	Wołyń	Głowacka
2018	Agnieszka Suchora	Cicha noc	Adam's mother
2018	Bronisława Zamachowska	Afterimage	Nika Strzemińska
2018	Karolina Gruszka	Ach śpij kochanie	Anna
2019	Aleksandra Konieczna	Jak pies z kotem	Iga
2019	Gabriela Muskała	7 uczuć	Weronika Porankowska
2019	Agata Kulesza	Cold War	Irena Bielecka
2020	Eliza Rycembel	Corpus Christi	Marta
2020	Agata Buzek	Córka trenera	Kamila
2020	Jowita Budnik	Ikar. Legenda Mietka Kosza	Mietek's mother
2020	Marta Żmuda-Trzebiatowska	Mowa ptaków	Jakubcowa
2020	Kasia Smutniak	Słodki koniec dnia	Maria's daughter
2021	Kinga Preis	Jak najdalej stąd	Ola's mother
2021	Maria Sobocińska	Wszystko dla mojej matki	Agnes
2021	Magdalena Różczka	25 lat niewinności. Sprawa Tomka Komendy	Remigiusz's wife
2021	Agata Kulesza	Sala samobójców. Hejter	Beata Santorska
2021	Danuta Stenka	Sala samobójców. Hejter	Zofia Krasucka
2022	Ewa Wiśniewska	Zupa nic	Grandma
2022	Anna Dymna	Amatorzy	Krzysiek's mother
2022	Agata Kulesza	Wesela	Ela Wilk
2022	Jowita Budnik	Wszystkie nasze strachy	Jadwiga
2022	Aleksandra Konieczna	Żeby nie było śladów	Wiesława Bardon
2022	Agnieszka Grochowska	Żeby nie było śladów	Grażyna Popiel
2023	Maria Pakulnis	Johnny	Hanna
2023	Matylda Damięcka	Apokawixa	Robsonica
2023	Magdalena Koleśnik	Inni ludzie	Aneta
2023	Maja Ostaszewska	Broad Peak	Ewa Dyakowska-Berbeka
2023	Aleksandra Konieczna	Śubuk	School principal
2024	Agnieszka Grochowska	Kos	Maria Giżyńska
2024	Ewa Kasprzyk	The Peasants	Marcjanna Pacześ Dominikowa
2024	Katarzyna Herman	Doppelgänger	police officer
2024	Sandra Drzymalska	Filip	Mariena
2024	Kinga Preis	Święto ognia	Józefina
2025	Trine Dyrholm	The Girl with the Needle	Dagmar
2025	Agata Kulesza	Simona Kossak	Elżbieta Kossak
2025	Joanna Kulig	Woman Of...	Iza
2025	Małgorzata Hajewska-Krzysztofik	Travel Essentials	Karolina
2025	Wiktoria Gorodeckaja	White Courage	Helena
