= Joanna Kulig =

Polish actress and singer (born 1982)

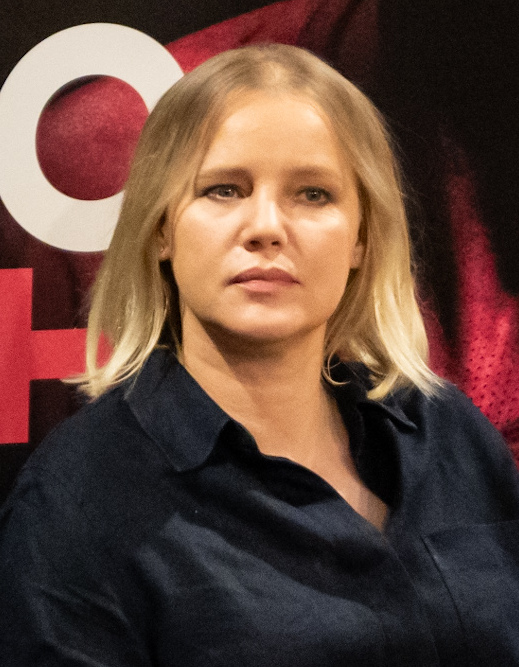
- Kulig in 2026
- Born: 24 June 1982 (age 44); Krynica, Poland
- Education: AST National Academy of Theatre Arts in Kraków
- Occupations: Actress; singer
- Years active: 1998–present
- Spouse: Maciej Bochniak (m. 2009)
- Children: 1

Signature
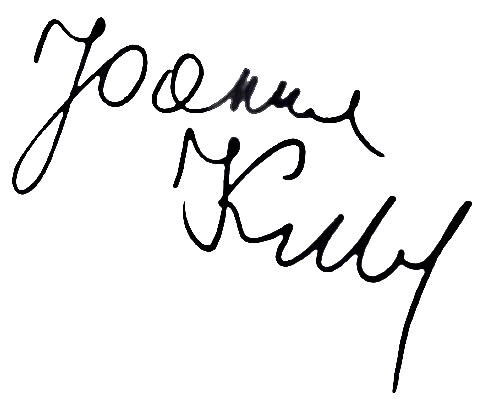

Joanna Kulig (Polish: [jɔˈanna ˈkulik]; born 24 June 1982) is a Polish actress and singer. Noted for performing in different languages, she has worked in film, television and radio as well as on stage. She is the recipient of a European Film Award and two Polish Film Awards, and her work has been recognised at various film festivals. In 2018, Polish magazine Wprost included her among the 50 most influential Poles for her contributions to the cinema of Poland.

After an unsuccessful attempt at a career as a jazz singer, Kulig enrolled at the AST National Academy of Theatre Arts in Kraków, graduating in 2007. She began performing on stage while still in drama school, debuting in the play A Midsummer Night's Dream. Her first starring film role in the 2007 drama Wednesday, Thursday Morning won her the award for Best Debut at the Polish Film Festival. She received further acclaim for her performance in the 2011 film Elles, which earned her Best Supporting Actress at the Polish Film Awards and Polish Film Festival.

Kulig became a frequent collaborator with director Paweł Pawlikowski. She appeared in four of his films: The Woman in the Fifth (2011), Ida (2013), Cold War (2018) and Fatherland (2026). Her starring role in Cold War earned her widespread recognition and Best Actress accolades at the European Film Awards and Polish Film Awards.

Kulig also received Polish Film Award nominations for her roles in the films Lasting (2013) and Woman Of... (2023). She achieved commercial success with Pitbull: Tough Women (2016) and Clergy (2018), both of which rank among the highest-grossing Polish films of all time. Her other film credits include Disco Polo (2015), The Innocents (2016), Kompromat (2022), She Came to Me (2023), Knox Goes Away (2023) and Wild, Wild East (2026). On television, she played the lead role in the sitcom Don't Worry About Me (2014–2018) and starred in the Netflix series The Eddy (2020) and Lead Children (2026).

== Early life and education ==
Kulig was born on 24 June 1982 in Krynica, Lesser Poland Voivodeship, Poland. Her mother worked as a cook at a local kindergarten and her father was a folk poet. She was raised in a musical family along with four siblings—two older brothers and two younger sisters—in Muszynka. One of her sisters, Justyna Schneider, is also an actress and adopted their great-grandmother's surname to avoid confusion as their first names are similar.

As a child, Kulig sang in a church choir. She also performed at weddings and dance parties with her siblings. From 1995, she studied piano at the Frédéric Chopin First Degree State Music School in Krynica, graduating in 1999. At 15, she left her family home and lived at boarding schools, first in Krynica, then in Kraków, where she moved at 18 and enrolled at the Mieczysław Karłowicz State Music School Complex, from which she graduated in singing in 2003. She also completed a Vocational Technical High School for Hotel Administration in Kraków a year earlier. Kulig initially wanted to be a professional jazz singer. She applied twice to study jazz at the Karol Szymanowski Academy of Music, but was rejected on both occasions. She was also interested in conducting, but was also unsuccessful. She explained: "no one wanted me, so I went to university to do drama and singing," which started her acting career. After four years of studies, she earned an acting degree with a specialisation in singing from the AST National Academy of Theatre Arts in Kraków in 2007. She was the first in her family to graduate from a university. During this time, she spent some time working as a waitress in London.

== Career ==
=== 1998–2018: Career beginnings and stardom in Poland ===
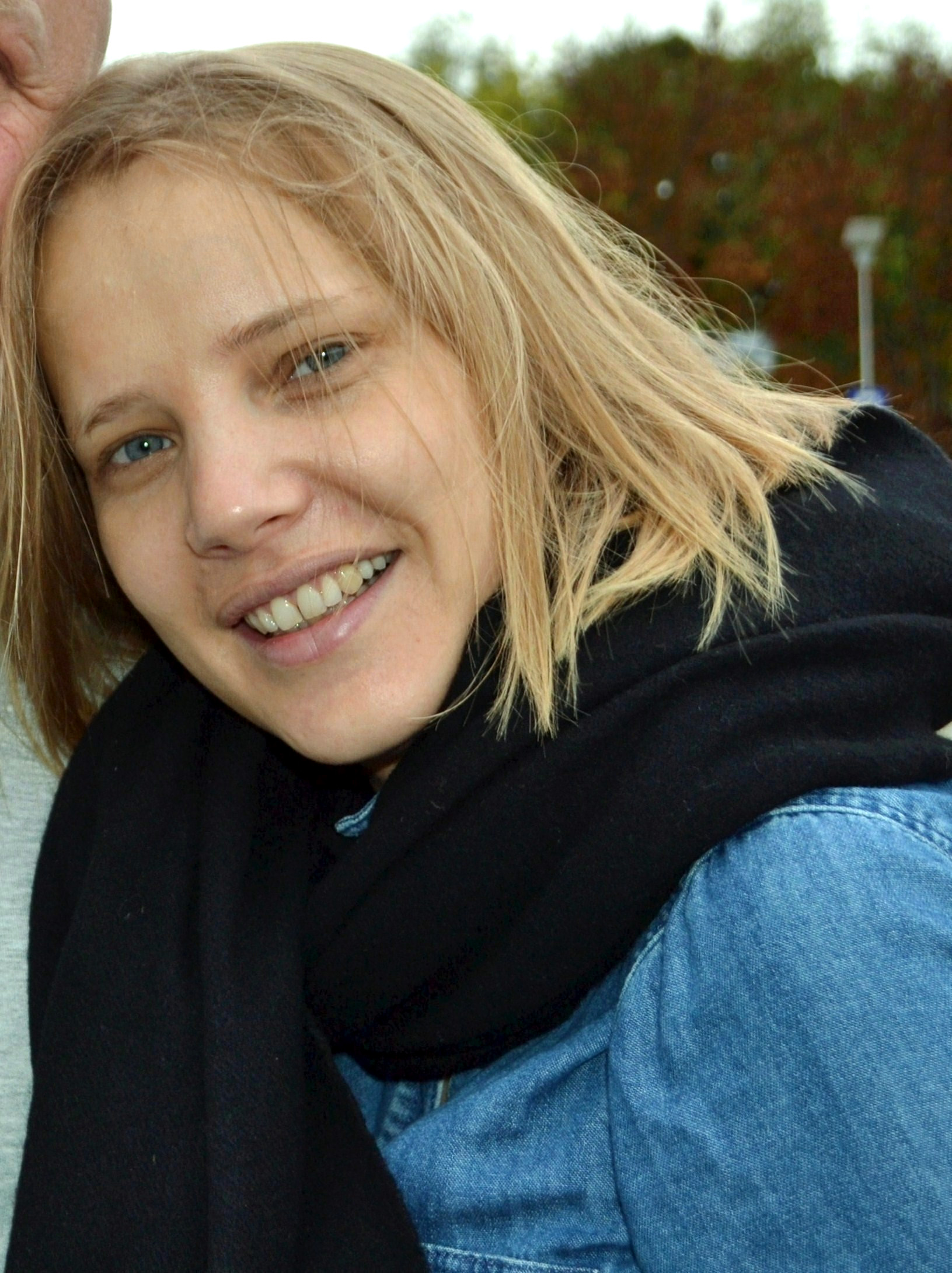
Kulig in 2015

In 1998, Kulig won an episode of the Polish television talent show A Chance for Success by performing Grzegorz Turnau's song "Między ciszą a ciszą". As a result, she advanced to the show's annual final, in which she came third. Turnau later invited her to sing with him on his 2002 album Nawet. Kulig also participated in season two of the Polish television talent show Idol in 2002. She was eliminated in the semi-finals.

In 2006, while still in drama school, she made her stage debut as Hermia in the play A Midsummer Night's Dream at the Helena Modrzejewska National Old Theatre in Kraków. In 2007, she starred in Grzegorz Pacek's drama Wednesday, Thursday Morning, which marked her film debut and earned her the Polish Film Festival award for Best Debut. She followed this with the titular role in the 2008 television play Doktor Halina. Kulig later admitted that seeing herself in the play on television convinced her to return to acting as she quit briefly. She said: "When I was trying to convince myself that it was over and I quit as it was not for me, Doktor Halina came on TV. I was impressed. I was sitting watching this performance and thought: 'Gosh, I'm really not that bad!'". Her performance caught the attention of director Paweł Pawlikowski, and he invited her to audition for the lead role in his film Ida. Although deemed unfit for the part, she impressed Pawlikowski who became determined to work with her on another project. While making his 2011 psychological thriller The Woman in the Fifth, he created a role that was not originally in the script specifically for her. In the film, set in Paris, she portrayed Ania, a Polish barmaid who falls in love with the protagonist American writer Tom Ricks (Ethan Hawke). In 2011, Kulig was also partnered with Juliette Binoche for Małgorzata Szumowska's drama Elles, similarly set in Paris, in which she played Alicja, a Polish economics student who moonlights as a prostitute. She learned to speak French for both parts. While the films premiered to a mixed reception, Kulig's performance in the latter received praise. Kevin Jagernauth of IndieWire opined that she "has the potential to be breakout star boasting a strong screen presence and an undeniable beauty". She won Best Supporting Actress at the Polish Academy Awards and Polish Film Festival. Aside from these two projects, 2011 saw Kulig appear in the war drama Remembrance, in which she performed in German. She also starred in the 2011 Polish comedies: Los numeros, Million Dollars and Dance Marathon. She earned a Golden Duck nomination for Best Actress for her performances in the last two.

Kulig received her second Polish Academy Award nomination for Best Supporting Actress for her role in Jacek Borcuch's drama Lasting, which premiered at the 2013 Sundance Film Festival and was described by The Hollywood Reporter as "fine-tuned on every level". Later that year, she appeared in Pawlikowski's Academy Award-winning drama Ida, and in Eun-jin Pang's film Way Back Home. Initially considered to play the title character in the former, she was instead cast in a smaller role of a nightclub singer. Kulig also had a small part in the 2013 blockbuster Hansel & Gretel: Witch Hunters, which required her to wear prosthetics. In preparation for the English-speaking role, she worked with dialect coach Andrew Jack. In 2014, Kulig was cast in a leading role on the Polish sitcom Don't Worry About Me, starring as Iga in its first nine seasons until 2018. She next starred in the romantic comedies Sophie Seeks Seven (2014) and Warsaw by Night (2015), and in the commercially successful films Disco Polo (2015) and Pitbull: Tough Women (2016). Disco Polo, directed by her husband Maciej Bochniak, saw her in the role of a disco polo star Gensonina. In Pitbull: Tough Women, Poland's highest-grossing film of 2016 and the seventh highest-grossing Polish film of all time, Kulig played a policewoman Zuza. She also portrayed Sister Irena in Anne Fontaine's critically acclaimed 2016 World War II drama The Innocents inspired by the true story of Polish Catholic nuns who became pregnant from rape by Soviet soldiers stationed near their convent.

=== 2018–2024: International recognition ===
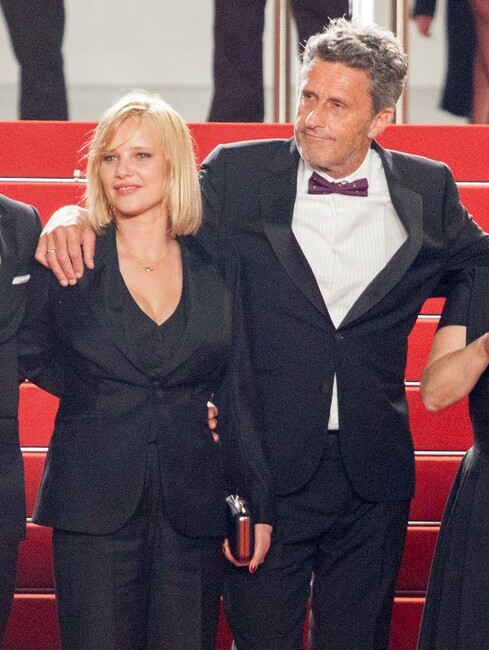
Kulig with Paweł Pawlikowski at the 2018 Cannes Film Festival

Kulig's international breakthrough came in 2018 when she starred in Pawlikowski's historical drama film Cold War. The film marked their third collaboration, which prompted Pawlikowski to call her his "muse". The part of Zula, a woman in post-war Poland who joins a folk music touring group, was once again written by Pawlikowski with her in mind. Kulig was drawn to the role as it required her to sing and dance, allowing her to showcase her talents; she trained with a folk group for half a year in preparation for the part. In the film, she notably performs the traditional Polish folk song "Dwa serduszka" ("Two Hearts"), termed by Vulture as "the movie's unofficial theme song". Mark Kermode of The Observer wrote that she "delivers a star-making performance of astonishing range and depth", and Mick LaSalle of San Francisco Chronicle stated that "she takes the role of a lifetime between her teeth, chomps on it, pounds it into the ground and never lets go for a second." According to Scott Feinberg of The Hollywood Reporter, "in a fair world ... Kulig would not only be a serious contender for a best actress nom, but would quickly become an in-demand actress in Hollywood, too." Kulig received the Best Actress Award at the 31st European Film Awards, and the Polish Academy Award for Best Actress for her performance. That same year, she played local priest's pregnant girlfriend in Wojciech Smarzowski's film Clergy, which went on to become the highest-grossing Polish film of all time. Due to its themes of child abuse, corruption and alcoholism in the Catholic Church in Poland, the film caused controversy especially among right-wing groups in the largely Catholic country and led to a nationwide debate about the role of the church in the Polish society. In 2019, she was cast in the recurring role of Johanna, titular character's mother, in Amazon Studios series Hanna.

Kulig starred as Polish jazz singer Maja in Damien Chazelle's 2020 Netflix musical drama series The Eddy. The character was originally intended to be American, but after meeting with Chazelle the part was rewritten for her. In 2021, Kulig was cast as the lead in TVN thriller series Spider's Web playing a spider behaviour specialist trying to unravel the mystery of the death of her mother and sister. She served as one of the jurors of the Un Certain Regard section at the 2022 Cannes Film Festival. That year, she had a starring role opposite Gilles Lellouche in the action thriller Kompromat, directed by Jérôme Salle. Her part was French- and Russian-speaking, and she worked with dialect coaches in preparation for it. The film was released to mixed reception, and of Kulig's role Paste's Andy Crump wrote: "Diminishing the shine of an actress as luminous as Kulig is an impressive feat, but she's left darkened as Lellouche's object of desire, unable to perform beyond the single dimension given to her."

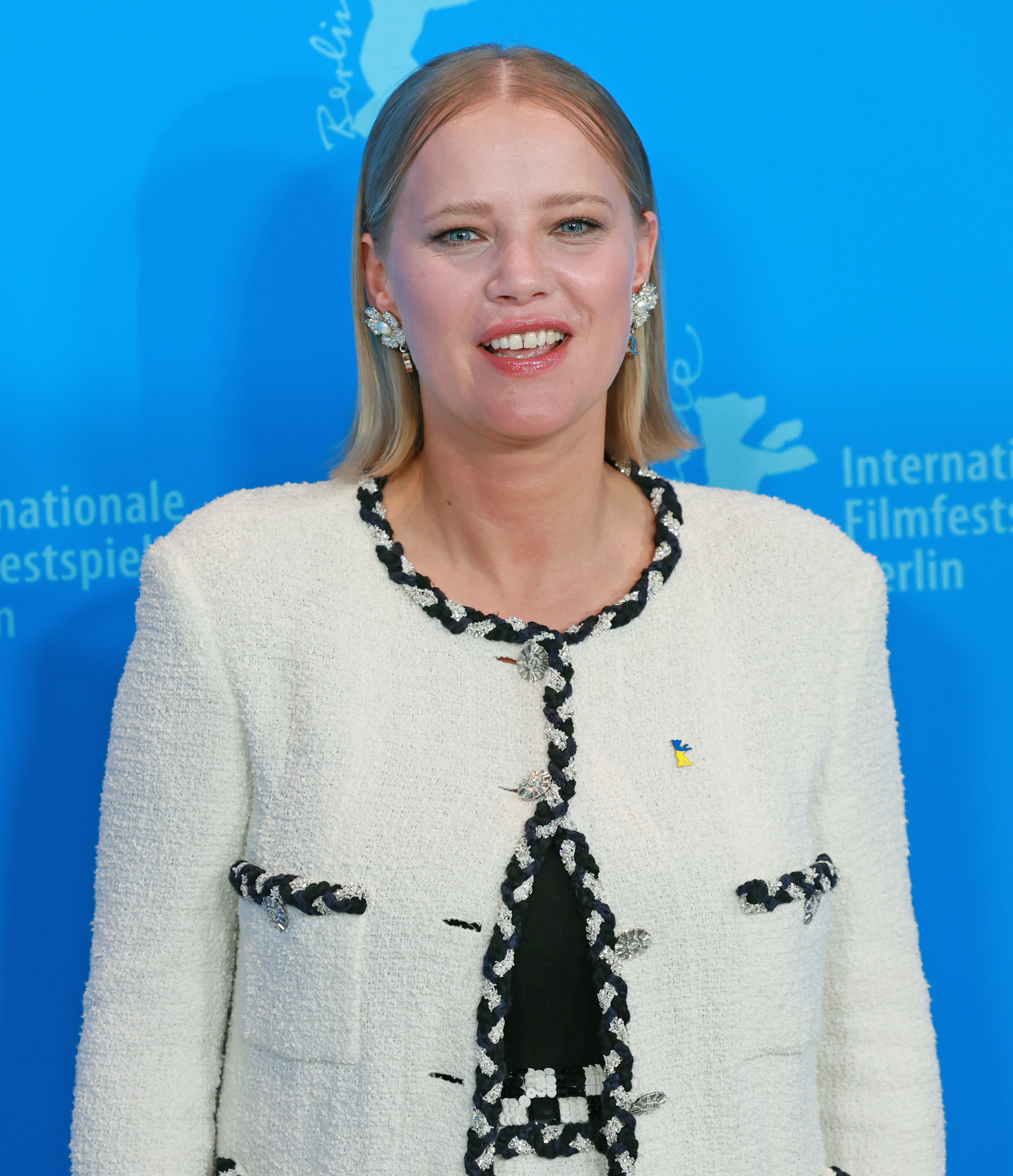
Kulig at the 2023 Berlin International Film Festival

In 2023, Kulig appeared in Rebecca Miller's romantic comedy She Came to Me alongside Peter Dinklage, Anne Hathaway, Marisa Tomei and Brian d'Arcy James. She was Miller's first choice for the role of a Polish immigrant Magdalena as she regards her "the greatest Polish actress, I know". Despite the mixed reception of the film, Kate Erbland of IndieWire found Kulig's performance "heartbreaking", and David Rooney of The Hollywood Reporter thought that "only Kulig ... registers as a compassionate presence grounded in a modicum of truth." Kulig next starred as a wife of a man transitioning to a woman in socially conservative Poland in Małgorzata Szumowska and Michał Englert's drama Woman Of..., which premiered at the 2023 Venice International Film Festival to critical acclaim. The role earned her a nomination for the Polish Academy Award for Best Supporting Actress. Kulig also had a supporting role in Michael Keaton's 2023 noir thriller Knox Goes Away, and made a guest appearance in Apple TV+ 2024 miniseries Masters of the Air set during World War II. Reviewing the former, Pete Hammond of Deadline Hollywood said that "she makes an impression as Knox's faithful lover". In Masters of the Air, she played a Polish war widow who crosses paths with Major John "Bucky" Egan (Callum Turner) during his stay in London; a fan of director Cary Joji Fukunaga, she accepted the role as she wanted to work with him.

=== 2025–present: Established actress ===
In 2025, Kulig had a recurring role in season five of The Office PL, a Polish adaptation of the British series The Office, and starred as a wife of a dying man in Nora Jaenicke's psychological thriller Isola. She portrayed Jolanta Wadowska-Król, a Polish paediatrician who uncovered widespread lead poisoning among children in 1970s Silesia, in the 2026 Netflix series Lead Children, inspired by her life. In 2026, Kulig also appeared in Pawlikowski's film Fatherland as a jazz singer, and had a role in the HBO Max series Proud. She starred in Jan Holoubek's World War II thriller Wild, Wild East, which premiered at the 2026 Toronto International Film Festival. Kulig is set to release her debut studio album later that year.

== Personal life ==
Kulig is a practicing Christian. Aside from speaking Polish—her first language—she speaks English, French and German, and has performed in those languages. In 2009, she married film director and screenwriter Maciej Bochniak. On 14 February 2019, she gave birth to their son at the UCLA Santa Monica Medical Center.

An ambassador for Anna Dymna's Against the Odds Foundation—an organisation helping adults with intellectual disabilities—Kulig has supported its efforts on numerous occasions. In 2023, she was honoured with St. Brother Albert Medal for her charity work for people with disabilities, which she dedicated to her mother. When accepting the award, she said: "Moments like this show that it is worth helping others. Thank you mum for teaching me that."

Kulig starred in the autumn-winter 2018 advertising campaign for fashion retailer Reserved, alongside Jeanne Damas. In 2018, Polish magazine Wprost included her among the 50 most influential Poles for her contributions to the cinema of Poland, and Glamour Poland named her Woman of the Year. She also ranked fourth on the former's 2019 list of the 50 most influential Polish women. In 2023, she became a member of the Academy of Motion Picture Arts and Sciences.

== Acting credits ==
Key
| † | Denotes films that have not yet been released |

=== Film ===
| Year | Title | Role | Notes | Ref. |
|---|---|---|---|---|
| 2007 | Wednesday, Thursday Morning | Teresa | | |
| 2009 | Janosik: A True Story | Girl | Polish dub, choir | |
| 2009 | I Love You So Much | Ewelina | Short film | |
| 2011 | Los numeros | Sylwia | | |
| 2011 | Million Dollars | Zuzanna | | |
| 2011 | Dance Marathon | Agnieszka | | |
| 2011 | Przyjęcie | —N/a | Documentary; concept only | |
| 2011 | Elles | Alicja | | |
| 2011 | The Woman in the Fifth | Ania | | |
| 2011 | Remembrance | Magdalena Limanowska | | |
| 2012 | A Turtle's Tale 2: Sammy's Escape from Paradise | Konsuela | Polish dub | |
| 2013 | Hansel & Gretel: Witch Hunters | Red-Haired Witch | | |
| 2013 | Lasting | Marta | | |
| 2013 | Zambezia | Neville's Wife | Polish dub | |
| 2013 | Ida | Singer | | |
| 2013 | Khumba | Fifi | Polish dub | |
| 2013 | Way Back Home | Yalka | | |
| 2014 | Sophie Seeks Seven | Patrycja | | |
| 2015 | Warsaw by Night | Marek's Ex-Lover | Segment: Iga | |
| 2015 | Disco Polo | Anka "Gensonina" | | |
| 2016 | The Innocents | Sister Irena | | |
| 2016 | Pitbull: Tough Women | Zuza | | |
| 2017 | Cargo | Unnamed | Animated short film | |
| 2018 | Cold War | Zula Lichoń | | |
| 2018 | Play | Mother | Short film | |
| 2018 | Clergy | Hanka Tomala | | |
| 2018 | 7 Emotions | Gosia's Mother | | |
| 2018 | Love Is Everything | Magda Rodzińska | | |
| 2019 | I Am Lying Now | Agent | | |
| 2019 | Safe Inside | Sylvia | | |
| 2022 | Everyone Knows Better | Ania | | |
| 2022 | Kompromat | Svetlana | | |
| 2023 | She Came to Me | Magdalena Szyskowski | | |
| 2023 | Woman Of... | Iza Wesoły | | |
| 2023 | Knox Goes Away | Annie | | |
| 2025 | Isola | Joanna | | |
| 2026 | Fatherland | Singer in a Jazz Band | | |
| 2026 | Wild, Wild East | TBA | | |
| 2026 | The Tuners | —N/a | Documentary short; executive producer only | |
| 2027 | Moja przyjaciółka krowa † | Mum | | |

=== Television ===
| Year | Title | Role | Notes | Ref. |
|---|---|---|---|---|
| 1998 | A Chance for Success | Herself | Contestant | |
| 2002 | Idol | Herself | Season 2 contestant | |
| 2006 | Pensjonat pod Różą | Kasia | 2 episodes | |
| 2007 | Pastorałka | Angel / Caroller | Television play | |
| 2007 | Prime Minister | Magdalena Nowasz | 3 episodes | |
| 2008 | Teraz albo nigdy! | Zyta | 4 episodes | |
| 2008 | Doktor Halina | Halina Szwarc | Television play | |
| 2008 | Days of Honor | "Mucha" | 5 episodes | |
| 2008 | Trzeci oficer | Halina | Episode: "Dezerter" | |
| 2009 | Father Matthew | Dorota Mielnicka | Episode: "Koncert" | |
| 2010–2011 | Szpilki na Giewoncie | Wika Bura | 15 episodes | |
| 2011 | Janosik: A True Story | Girl | Polish dub, choir | |
| 2011 | Smuteczek czyli ostatni naiwni | Sasanna | Television special | |
| 2013 | Spies of Warsaw | Renata | 1 episode | |
| 2013 | Na krawędzi | Sylwia Zawada | 5 episodes | |
| 2013 | Pamiętniki pani Hanki | Hanka | Television play | |
| 2014–2015 | The Crime | Monika Krajewska | | |
| 2014–2018 | Don't Worry About Me | Jadwiga "Iga" Małecka | 103 episodes | |
| 2014 | Ocalony świat | Herself | Documentary series; 1 episode | |
| 2016 | Dom kobiet | Róża | Television play | |
| 2018 | The Trap | Justyna Mateja | 3 episodes | |
| 2019–2021 | Hanna | Johanna | 6 episodes | |
| 2020 | The Eddy | Maja | | |
| 2021 | Tuca & Bertie | Esther Emu | Voice, episode: "Bird Mechanics" | |
| 2021 | Spider's Web | Kornelia Titko | | |
| 2024 | Masters of the Air | Paulina | Episode: "Part Four" | |
| 2025 | The Office PL | Michalina Biegun | 5 episodes | |
| 2026 | Lead Children | Jolanta Wadowska-Król | | |
| 2026 | Proud | Teresa Mielnicz | 3 episodes | |
| 2026 | Britney † | Britney Spears | Television play | |

=== Stage ===
| Year | Title | Role | Playwright | Theatre | Ref. |
|---|---|---|---|---|---|
| 2006 | A Midsummer Night's Dream | Hermia | William Shakespeare | Helena Modrzejewska National Old Theatre, Kraków | |
| 2007 | Assemblywomen | Girl | Aristophanes | Helena Modrzejewska National Old Theatre, Kraków | |
| 2007 | Oresteia | Tisiphone | Aeschylus | Helena Modrzejewska National Old Theatre, Kraków | |
| 2007 | Operetta | Unnamed | Witold Gombrowicz | Theater Scena STU, Kraków | |
| 2007 | Oczyszczenie | Make-Up Artist | Petr Zelenka | Theater Scena STU, Kraków | |
| 2008 | Zakochany Paryż | Unnamed | —N/a | Kielce Cultural Centre | |
| 2009 | The Beelzebub Sonata | Hilda | Stanisław Ignacy Witkiewicz | Theater Scena STU, Kraków | |
| 2010 | Vassa Zheleznova | Natalya | Maxim Gorky | Och-Theatre, Warsaw | |
| 2013 | Chopin | Kornelia | Marcin Macuk | Palladium Theatre, Warsaw | |
| 2014 | Niech no tylko zakwitną jabłonie | Cocotte Mimi / Hela | Agnieszka Osiecka | Ateneum Theatre, Warsaw | |
| 2016 | Róbmy swoje. Piosenki Wojciecha Młynarskiego | Performer | Wojciech Młynarski | Ateneum Theatre, Warsaw | |

=== Radio ===
| Year | Title | Role | Playwright | Radio | Ref. |
|---|---|---|---|---|---|
| 2014 | Katarantka | Podaj Mi Rękę | Tomasz Man | Polish Radio | |
| 2015 | Death in Venice | Tadzio | Thomas Mann | Polish Radio | |
| 2016 | Woody Love | Emma | Antoni Winch | Polish Radio | |
| 2016 | Animal Ferocity | Unnamed | Stanisław Barańczak | Polish Radio | |
| 2017 | Futbolistki | Captain's Girlfriend | Tomasz Man | Polish Radio | |

=== Podcast ===
| Year | Title | Role | Notes | Ref. |
|---|---|---|---|---|
| 2019 | Modern Love | Narrator | Episode: "A Kiss Deferred by Civil War" | |

== Discography ==
| Title | Year | Album | Ref. |
|---|---|---|---|
| "Gniew" (Grzegorz Turnau with backing vocals from Joanna Kulig) | 2002 | Nawet | |
| "Liryka, liryka" (Grzegorz Turnau with backing vocals from Joanna Kulig) | 2002 | Nawet | |
| "Oddal żal" (Grzegorz Turnau with backing vocals from Joanna Kulig) | 2002 | Nawet | |
| "Sancho (dytyramb)" (Grzegorz Turnau with backing vocals from Joanna Kulig) | 2002 | Nawet | |
| "Gdybym była prezydentem" | 2013 | Pamiętnik Pani Hanki (Piosenki z musicalu) | |
| "Lubię być szczęśliwa" | 2013 | Pamiętnik Pani Hanki (Piosenki z musicalu) | |
| "Małżeństwo to jest gra" | 2013 | Pamiętnik Pani Hanki (Piosenki z musicalu) | |
| "Trzydziesty dziewiąty" (with Kamilla Baar, Ewa Konstancja Bułhak, Jacek Koman, Joachim Lamża, Grzegorz Małecki, Danuta Stenka, Borys Szyc, Krzysztof Wakulinski and Maciej Zakościelny) | 2013 | Pamiętnik Pani Hanki (Piosenki z musicalu) | |
| "24 mila baci" | 2013 | Ida | |
| "Guarda Che Luna" | 2013 | Ida | |
| "Miłość w Portofino" | 2013 | Ida | |
| "Nie płacz kiedy odjadę" | 2013 | Ida | |
| "O Jimmy Joe" | 2013 | Ida | |
| "Rudy rydz" | 2013 | Ida | |
| "Dość" (with Dawid Ogrodnik) | 2013 | Muzyka z serca 2014 | |
| "Czas nas uczy pogody" | 2014 | Sophie Seeks Seven | |
| "Takiego chłopaka" | 2014 | Sophie Seeks Seven | |
| "Dziś idę walczyć mamo" (with O.S.T.R., Waldemar Kasta and Joanna Lewandowska) | 2014 | Nowe Pokolenie 14/44 | |
| "Bo wszyscy Polacy" (with Dawid Ogrodnik) | 2015 | Piosenki z filmu Disco Polo | |
| "Oczy czarne" | 2015 | Piosenki z filmu Disco Polo | |
| "Taka jestem" | 2015 | Piosenki z filmu Disco Polo | |
| "Takim cię wyśniłam" | 2015 | Piosenki z filmu Disco Polo | |
| "Cargo" (Wysokilot and Fidser featuring Joanna Kulig) | 2015 | Tylko swoi | |
| "Baio Bongo" | 2018 | Cold War (Original Motion Picture Soundtrack) | |
| "Deux coeurs" | 2018 | Cold War (Original Motion Picture Soundtrack) | |
| "Dwa serduszka" | 2018 | Cold War (Original Motion Picture Soundtrack) | |
| "Dwa serduszka" (jazz version) | 2018 | Cold War (Original Motion Picture Soundtrack) | |
| "I Loves You, Porgy" | 2018 | Cold War (Original Motion Picture Soundtrack) | |
| "Ja za wodą, ty za wodą" | 2018 | Cold War (Original Motion Picture Soundtrack) | |
| "Kak mnogo devushek khoroshikh (Serdtse)" | 2018 | Cold War (Original Motion Picture Soundtrack) | |
| "Kantata o Stalinie" | 2018 | Cold War (Original Motion Picture Soundtrack) | |
| "Loin de toi" | 2018 | Cold War (Original Motion Picture Soundtrack) | |
| "Międzynarodówka" | 2018 | Cold War (Original Motion Picture Soundtrack) | |
| "Svilen konac" | 2018 | Cold War (Original Motion Picture Soundtrack) | |
| "Związane mam ręce" (Młynarski-Masecki Jazz Camerata Varsoviensis featuring Joanna Kulig) | 2018 | Fogg – Pieśniarz Warszawy | |
| "Yes Sir, I Can Boogie" | 2018 | Non-album song | |
| "Chociaż zmęczona" | 2018 | Kolędy 2018 | |
| "Mizerna cicha" (with Michał Bajor) | 2018 | Kolędy 2018 | |
| "Ja się nie przyzwyczaję" (with Julia Konarska, Olga Sarzyńska, Katarzyna Ucherska, Wojciech Brzeziński, Krzysztof Gosztyła and Tomasz Schuchardt) | 2019 | Ateneum gra Młynarskiego | |
| "Siedzę w oknie, patrzę w dal" | 2019 | Ateneum gra Młynarskiego | |
| "Bar Fly" (with The Eddy Band) | 2020 | The Eddy (From the Original Netflix Series) | |
| "Black Cat" (with The Eddy Band) | 2020 | The Eddy (From the Original Netflix Series) | |
| "Can't Stay Away" (with The Eddy Band) | 2020 | The Eddy (From the Original Netflix Series) | |
| "Call Me When You Get There" (with The Eddy Band) | 2020 | The Eddy (From the Original Netflix Series) | |
| "Dupin's Blue" (with The Eddy Band) | 2020 | The Eddy (From the Original Netflix Series) | |
| "Elle me dit" (with The Eddy Band) | 2020 | The Eddy (From the Original Netflix Series) | |
| "Gossip" (with The Eddy Band) | 2020 | The Eddy (From the Original Netflix Series) | |
| "Le Serpent qui danse" (with Tchéky Karyo) | 2020 | The Eddy (From the Original Netflix Series) | |
| "Let It Go" (with The Eddy Band) | 2020 | The Eddy (From the Original Netflix Series) | |
| "Kiss Me in the Morning" (with The Eddy Band) | 2020 | The Eddy (From the Original Netflix Series) | |
| "Not a Day Goes By" (with The Eddy Band) | 2020 | The Eddy (From the Original Netflix Series) | |
| "On the Way" (with The Eddy Band and Arnaud Dolmen) | 2020 | The Eddy (From the Original Netflix Series) | |
| "Open to Persuasion" (with The Eddy Band) | 2020 | The Eddy (From the Original Netflix Series) | |
| "PCH" (with The Eddy Band) | 2020 | The Eddy (From the Original Netflix Series) | |
| "Play All Night" (with The Eddy Band and Arnaud Dolmen) | 2020 | The Eddy (From the Original Netflix Series) | |
| "The Eddy" (with The Eddy Band) | 2020 | The Eddy (From the Original Netflix Series) | |
| "The Eddy" (with The Eddy Band, Amandla Stenberg and André Holland) | 2020 | The Eddy (From the Original Netflix Series) | |
| "Cicha noc" (with Zbigniew Wodecki) | 2020 | Non-album songs | |
| "Kolęda na ten czas" (with Irena Santor, Anna Rusowicz, Monika Kuszyńska, Jacek Cygan, Piotr Rubik, Zbigniew Zamachowski, Krzysztof Cugowski, Wojciech Cugowski, Czesław Mozil, Mietek Szcześniak, Adam Nowak, Mateusz Pospieszalski and Marcin Januszkiewicz) | 2020 | Non-album songs | |
| "Już kąpiesz się nie dla mnie" (Szymon Komasa featuring Joanna Kulig and Aleksander Dębicz) | 2021 | Piosenki z Kabaretu Starszych Panów. Laboratorium | |
| "Piosenka jest dobra na wszystko" (Szymon Komasa featuring Joanna Kulig, Aleksander Dębicz and Santander Orchestra) | 2021 | Piosenki z Kabaretu Starszych Panów. Laboratorium | |
| "To będzie miłość nieduża" (Szymon Komasa featuring Joanna Kulig and Santander Orchestra) | 2021 | Piosenki z Kabaretu Starszych Panów. Laboratorium | |

== Awards and nominations ==
| Award | Year | Category | Work | Result | Ref. |
|---|---|---|---|---|---|
| Chlotrudis Awards | 2019 | Best Actress | Cold War | Nominated | |
| El Gouna Film Festival | 2018 | Best Actress | Cold War | Won | |
| Elle Style Awards (Poland) | 2024 | International Success | —N/a | Won | |
| European Film Awards | 2018 | Best Actress | Cold War | Won | |
| Gala's Roses | 2015 | Film | Disco Polo | Nominated | |
| Gala's Roses | 2018 | Film | Cold War | Nominated | |
| Gala's Roses | 2018 | Special Award | —N/a | Won | |
| Glamour Woman of the Year (Poland) | 2012 | Glamour Style Entrance | —N/a | Nominated | |
| Glamour Woman of the Year (Poland) | 2015 | Talent | —N/a | Nominated | |
| Glamour Woman of the Year (Poland) | 2018 | Glamour Woman of the Year | —N/a | Won | |
| Golden Duck | 2008 | Best Actress | Wednesday, Thursday Morning | Nominated | |
| Golden Duck | 2011 | Best Actress | Dance Marathon; Million Dollars | Nominated | |
| Golden Duck | 2012 | Best Actress | Elles | Nominated | |
| IndieWire Critics Poll | 2018 | Best Lead Actress | Cold War | Fourth | |
| International Cinephile Society Awards | 2019 | Best Actress | Cold War | Nominated | |
| The Kosciuszko Foundation Washington DC Polish Film Festival | 2024 | Best Actress | Woman Of... | Won | |
| Koszalin Festival of Film Debuts "The Youth and Film" | 2008 | Acting Debut | Wednesday, Thursday Morning | Won | |
| London Film Critics' Circle Awards | 2019 | Best Actress | Cold War | Nominated | |
| National Broadcasting Council Awards | 2016 | Arete Award for Acting Debut in the Polish Radio Theatre | Katarantka | Won | |
| Palm Springs International Film Festival | 2019 | FIPRESCI Prize for Best Actress in a Foreign Language Film | Cold War | Won | |
| Polish Film Awards | 2013 | Best Supporting Actress | Elles | Won | |
| Polish Film Awards | 2014 | Best Supporting Actress | Lasting | Nominated | |
| Polish Film Awards | 2019 | Best Actress | Cold War | Won | |
| Polish Film Awards | 2025 | Best Supporting Actress | Woman Of... | Nominated | |
| Polish Film Festival | 2007 | Best Debut | Wednesday, Thursday Morning | Won | |
| Polish Film Festival | 2012 | Best Supporting Actress | Elles | Won | |
| Polish Film Festival | 2012 | Elle Crystal Star Award | Elles | Won | |
| Polityka's Passports | 2019 | Film | Cold War | Won | |
| Telecameras | 2015 | Actress | Don't Worry About Me | Third | |
| Telecameras | 2016 | Actress | Don't Worry About Me | Nominated | |
| Telecameras | 2019 | Actress | Don't Worry About Me | Won | |
| Telecameras | 2022 | Actress of Last 25 Years | —N/a | Nominated | |
| Telecameras | 2026 | Actress | —N/a | Nominated | |
| Transatlantyk Festival | 2018 | Transatlantyk Golden Ark for Best Actress | —N/a | Won | |
| Two Theatres Festival | 2008 | Polish Television Theatre: Best Female Role | Doktor Halina | Won | |
| Zbigniew Cybulski Award | 2013 | —N/a | Elles | Nominated | |
