= Lead Children =

Polish miniseries

- Polish: Ołowiane dzieci
- Written by: Jakub Korolczuk
- Directed by: Maciej Pieprzyca
- Starring: Joanna Kulig; Agata Kulesza; Kinga Preis; Michał Żurawski; Marian Dziędziel; Zbigniew Zamachowski
- Composers: Antoni Łazarkiewicz; Mary Komasa
- Country of origin: Poland
- Original language: Polish
- No. of episodes: 6

Production
- Executive producer: Wiesław Łysakowski
- Cinematography: Witold Płóciennik
- Production company: Orient-Film

Original release
- Network: Netflix
- Release: 11 February 2026

Lead Children (Polish: Ołowiane dzieci) is a 2026 Polish historical drama television miniseries created by Jakub Korolczuk, directed by Maciej Pieprzyca and based on a book by Przemilczana epidemia by Michał Jędryka. The miniseries is based on true events, but many details have been changed. It follows mass lead poisoning in children near a steelworks in 1974. It stars Joanna Kulig as Dr. Jolanta Wadowska-Król, Kinga Preis as nurse Wiesława Wilczek, and Agata Kulesza as professor Bożena Hager-Małecka. The miniseries was released on Netflix on 11 February 2026.

== Cast ==
- Joanna Kulig as Dr. Jolanta Wadowska-Król
- Agata Kulesza as professor Krystyna Berger (based on Bożena Hager-Małecka)
- Kinga Preis as nurse Wiesława Wilczek
- Michał Żurawski as Hubert Niedziela
- Marian Dziędziel as Jerzy Ziętek
- Zbigniew Zamachowski as Zdzisław Grudzień
- Sebastian Pawlak as Zbigniew Król

== Reception ==
The miniseries received positive reviews from both Polish and international critics. On the review aggregator website Rotten Tomatoes, 100% of critics' reviews are positive.
