= Kompromat (film) =

2022 drama film directed by Jérôme Salle

- Theatrical release poster
- Directed by: Jérôme Salle
- Written by: Jérôme Salle; Caryl Ferey
- Produced by: Albane de Jourdan; Jérôme Salle; Marc Simoncini
- Starring: Gilles Lellouche
- Cinematography: Matias Boucard
- Edited by: Stan Collet
- Music by: Guillaume Roussel
- Production company: Super 8 Production
- Distributed by: SND Groupe M6 (France)
- Release dates: 2 March 2022 (Alliance Française French Film Festival); 9 July 2022 (France)
- Running time: 127 minutes
- Country: France
- Languages: French; Russian
- Budget: $8.2 million
- Box office: $4.31 million

Kompromat is a 2022 French drama film directed and co-written by Jérôme Salle loosely based on the true story of Yoann Barbereau, director of the Alliance française in Irkutsk, Siberia, framed by the Russian Federal Security Service (FSB) with kompromat for the dissemination of child pornography and abusing his own daughter.

== Plot ==
Mathieu Roussel, director of the Alliance française in Irkutsk, Siberia, works to promote the French language and francophone culture in the area. Roussel is unexpectedly forcefully removed from his home and charged by the Russian Federal Security Service (FSB) with dissemination of child pornography on the Internet and molesting his own daughter. He is remanded into custody pending further investigation under Article 242 of the Criminal Code of Russia. Elements intended to discredit Roussel's reputation by portraying him as a sexual deviant are gathered together as kompromat, such as child pornography planted on his computer and a dance performance he presented that contained a passionate dance between two men. The other prisoners learn of the charges and beat him mercilessly.

Roussel's lawyer facilitates Roussel's relocation to house arrest under surveillance. Roussel obtains prohibited telephone SIM cards from Svetlana, a woman who believes in his innocence and despises her father-in-law Rostov, head of the FSB. These enable him to send text messages to her and to use the Internet without detection. Roussel's lawyer recognizes that Roussel will be convicted and sentenced to 10 to 15 years, so he advises Roussel to escape. Roussel covers his ankle bracelet with aluminium foil to stop it from tracking and heads to the bus station. When the FSB notices that his bracelet is not transmitting, Svetlana gives her husband the telephone number of the SIM card she gave to Roussel, which he passes on to the FSB. The FSB traces the number to a phone that has been left on the bus to Ulaanbaatar. Meanwhile, Svetlana has picked Roussel up in her car and taken him to another contact, who takes him to a secret apartment.

Former Spetsnaz Sagarine is called in to find the fugitive. He immediately suspects Svetlana of assisting him but is unable to find any evidence. Roussel's photo is shown on TV and his neighbours report him, so he flees and escapes into Moscow with the help of a priest who claims to be the bishop of the patriarch of Moscow in order to stop a search and prevent Roussel from being found in the boot of his car. Roussel reaches the French Embassy but the FSB quickly determines his location. Roussel attempts to escape amid a loud celebration being held at the embassy but is spotted by Sagarine. He manages to escape with the help of Svetlana, who drives him to the Estonian border. They have sex and Roussel tries to convince her to come with him but she says that she still loves her husband and will remain in Russia. He promises that he will call her but she says that she will not answer, then he starts walking toward the border. Svetlana's husband Sasha hangs himself after being scolded by his father for her actions. Svetlana calls home but is told by her father-in-law that she does not need to remain in Russia anymore. Sagarine spots Roussel's torch and he and his men chase Roussel through the woods. Sagarine finds Roussel in a marsh and nearly drowns him but Roussel overpowers Sagarine and drowns him instead, then flees across the border to Estonia. Svetlana reads in the news that Roussel has returned to France. Roussel calls Svetlana one last time but the film ends before Svetlana can answer, leaving her decision to answer the phone ambiguous and up to interpretation.

== Cast ==
- Gilles Lellouche as Mathieu Roussel
- Joanna Kulig as Svetlana
- Louis-Do de Lencquesaing as the French Ambassador
- Mikhail Gorevoy as Dimitri Rostov
- Aleksey Gorbunov as Borodin
- Elisa Lasowski as Alice Roussel
- Danila Vorobyov as Sasha Rostov
- Judith Henry as Michèle
- Igor Jijikine as Sagarine
- Pierre Hancisse as Juliene
- Mikhail Safronov as Ivanovich
- Marius Repšys as Shakir
- Olivia Malahieude as Rose Russell
- Sasha Piltsin as Sergey
- Marius Čižauskas as Stanislas
- Tanel Jonas as Vladimir
- Larisa Kalpokaitė as Julia
- Algirdas Latėnas as Boris
- Vidas Petkevičius as The Priest
- Artūras Lepiochinas as Mikhail
- Edmundas Kartanas as Sagarine's Chauffeur
- Vaidotas Zapolskis as Prison Guard
- Žydrūnas Milaševičius as Prison Guard
- Artūras Kavaliauskas as Prison Guard
- Cecile Geindre as DGSE Agent
- Gaulthier Baillot as DGSE Agent
- Olivier Hélie as Fred
- Aleksandras Kleinas as Customs Officer
- Vaidotas Martinaitis as Juge
- Algimantas Maceina as Yuri
- Matias Boucard as Gendarme
- Edvardas Bogusevičius as Grandfather
- Povilas Jatkevičius as Young Man
- Clotilde Solange Rigaud as Receptionist
- Aušra Giedraitytė as Ivanovich's Assistant

== Production ==
The film was planned to be a film about the actual kompromat case involving Yoann Barbereau. The production was unable to obtain rights to Barbereau's story, so a fictional story loosely based on the Barbereau case was created. Some similarities remain, for instance Barbereau was also the director of the Alliance française in Irkutsk, and was charged with disseminating child pornography and abusing his own daughter, only to escape from prison.

The film was co-written by Caryl Ferey and Jérôme Salle, directed by Salle, and co-produced by Salle, Albane de Jourdan, and Marc Simoncini. The score was composed by Guillaume Roussel. Cinematography is by Matias Boucard, and Stan Collet edited the film.

The film was shot in Lithuania as it was too risky to shoot in Russia. Filming was affected by the COVID-19 pandemic. The crew were unable to meet in person to discuss the filming, nor have a drink or a meal together. Salle said that this helped with the development of the character of Mathieu and the film.

The film was shot with a budget of $8.2 million.

== Release ==
The film premiered at Alliance Française French Film Festival on 2 March 2022. It was released in France on 7 September 2022.

== Reception ==
=== Box office ===
The film grossed $4.31 million worldwide.

=== Critical reception ===
On the review aggregator website Rotten Tomatoes, 73% of 30 critics' reviews are positive. The website's consensus reads: "If Kompromat isn't the most consistent -- or consistently believable -- political thriller, deft direction and a tense, fast-paced story make it a generally gripping watch." Metacritic, which uses a weighted average, assigned the film a score of 60 out of 100, based on 6 critics, indicating "mixed or average" reviews.

Reviewer Kyle Smith of The Wall Street Journal wrote, "The power of the film lies in how it crafts excitement out of a granular understanding of Russian state brutishness and the degree of determination it will require to evade it. It will take a spy’s level of resourcefulness to emerge from the labyrinth, and 'Kompromat' has the punch of a first-rate spy thriller."

Reviewer Michael Nordine of Variety called the film "cold but competent, which, whether intentional or not, is ultimately apropos of the subject matter."
