= Pitbull: Tough Women =

- Theatrical release poster
- Polish: Pitbull: Niebezpieczne kobiety
- Directed by: Patryk Vega
- Written by: Patryk Vega
- Produced by: Emil Stępień; Patryk Vega
- Starring: Alicja Bachleda-Curuś; Magdalena Cielecka; Anna Dereszowska; Sebastian Fabijański; Andrzej Grabowski; Joanna Kulig; Maja Ostaszewska; Tomasz Oświeciński; Piotr Stramowski; Artur Żmijewski; Zuzanna Grabowska; Aldona Jankowska; Wojciech Kalinowski
- Cinematography: Mirosław Brożek; Petro Aleksowski; Przemysław Niczyporuk
- Edited by: Tomasz Widarski
- Production company: Ent One
- Distributed by: Kino Świat (Poland)
- Release date: 11 November 2016 (Poland)
- Running time: 135 minutes
- Country: Poland
- Language: Polish
- Box office: $15 million

Pitbull: Tough Women (Polish: Pitbull: Niebezpieczne kobiety) is a 2016 Polish action film directed by Patryk Vega. It is the sequel to Pitbull: New Orders (also known as Pitbull: Public Order; 2016), and the third instalment in the Pitbull film series. Its sequel, Pitbull: Last Dog, was released in 2018.

Pitbull: Tough Women was Poland's highest-grossing film of 2016, and won the Amber Lion at the 2017 Gdynia Film Festival. It has grossed over $15 million worldwide, and as of June 2022, was the seventh highest-grossing Polish film of all time.

== Premise ==
Two female police officers, Zuza (Joanna Kulig) and Jadźka (Anna Dereszowska), fight to survive a police force filled with corrupt superiors and the brutal criminal mafia.

== Cast ==
- Alicja Bachleda-Curuś as Małgorzata "Drabina" Bojke
- Magdalena Cielecka as Lieutenant Izabela "Somalia" Zych
- Anna Dereszowska as Jadźka
- Sebastian Fabijański as Remigiusz "Cukier" Puchalski
- Andrzej Grabowski as Superintendent Jacek "Gebels" Goc
- Joanna Kulig as Zuza
- Maja Ostaszewska as Olka
- Tomasz Oświeciński as Marcin "Strachu" Opałka
- Piotr Stramowski as Darek "Majami"
- Artur Żmijewski as "Szelka", Jadźka's husband
- Zuzanna Grabowska as Cukier's attorney
- Aldona Jankowska as Cukier's mother
- Wojciech Kalinowski as Andrzej "Okej" Rękawik
