= Don't Worry About Me (Polish TV series) =

Polish comedy television series (2014–2021)

- DVD cover art
- Polish: O mnie się nie martw
- Genre: Comedy; Slice of life
- Written by: Aneta Głowska; Katarzyna Leżeńska
- Directed by: Michał Rogalski; Anna Kazejak
- Starring: Joanna Kulig; Stefan Pawłowski; Oliwia Dąbrowska; Maja Kwaśny; Paweł Domagała; Katarzyna Ankudowicz; Marcin Korcz; Aleksandra Adamska
- Opening theme: " O mnie się nie martw" by Margaret
- Country of origin: Poland
- Original language: Polish
- No. of seasons: 13
- No. of episodes: 169

Production
- Executive producer: Michał Kwieciński
- Running time: 45 minutes
- Production company: Akson Studio

Original release
- Network: TVP2
- Release: 5 September 2014 – 4 January 2021

Don't Worry About Me (Polish: O mnie się nie martw) is a Polish comedy television series that aired on TVP2 from 5 September 2014, to 4 January 2021.

Its Czech adaptation, O mě se neboj, premiered in 2022 on TV Nova. I'll Be Fine, a Bulgarian adaptation broadcast by bTV, was also released in 2022.

In 2019, Joanna Kulig won a Telekamery award for her role in the series.

== Premise ==
The main character, Iga Małecka (Joanna Kulig), is a double divorcee with two young kids, with no education and no job, who is not afraid to speak her mind. Fate connects her with a young and talented lawyer, Marcin Kaszuba (Stefan Pawłowski), who treats life as if it was one huge party.

== Main cast ==
- Joanna Kulig as Jadwiga "Iga" Małecka (series 1–9)
- Stefan Pawłowski as Marcin Kaszuba
- Oliwia Dąbrowska as Oliwka Małecka, Iga and Krzysztof's daughter
- Maja Kwaśny as Helenka Bonnet, Iga's daughter
- Paweł Domagała as Krzysztof Małecki, Iga's ex-husband
- Katarzyna Ankudowicz as Marta Piątek-Małecka
- Marcin Korcz as Paweł Radecki
- Aleksandra Adamska as Sylwia Małecka, przyrodnia siostra Krzysztof's half-sister

== Episodes ==
Series	Episodes		Originally released		Avg. viewers (millions)
Series	Episodes		First released	Last released	Avg. viewers (millions)
1	13		5 September 2014	28 November 2014	2.13
2	13		6 March 2015	5 June 2015	1.76
3	13		11 September 2015	4 December 2015	2.05
4	13		4 March 2016	3 June 2016	1.86
5	13		2 September 2016	2 December 2016	1.96
6	13		3 March 2017	2 June 2017	1.87
7	13		8 September 2017	1 December 2017	2.16
8	13		2 March 2018	1 June 2018	1.69
9	13		14 September 2018	7 December 2018	1.84
10	13		1 March 2019	31 May 2019	1.40
11	13		16 September 2019	16 December 2019	1.72
12	13	9	2 March 2020	4 May 2020	—N/a
12	13	4	14 September 2020	5 October 2020	—N/a
13	13		12 October 2020	4 January 2021	1.27
