= Woman Of... =

2023 film by Małgorzata Szumowska and Michał Englert

- Polish theatrical release poster
- Polish: Kobieta z...
- Directed by: Małgorzata Szumowska; Michał Englert
- Written by: Michał Englert; Małgorzata Szumowska
- Produced by: Gregory Jakilevitsch; Katarzyna Jordan-Kulczyk; Małgorzata Szumowska; Klaudia Śmieja-Rostworowska; Bogna Szewczyk-Skupień; Michał Englert
- Starring: Małgorzata Hajewska-Krzysztofik; Joanna Kulig; Mateusz Więcławek; Bogumiła Bajor
- Cinematography: Michał Englert
- Edited by: Jarosław Kamiński
- Music by: Jimek
- Production companies: No-Mad Films; Plio; Film i Väst; Common Ground Pictures
- Distributed by: Next Film (Poland); Lucky Dogs (Sweden)
- Release dates: 8 September 2023 (Venice); 5 April 2024 (Poland); 4 October 2024 (Sweden)
- Running time: 132 minutes
- Countries: Poland; Sweden
- Language: Polish
- Box office: $53,883

Woman Of... (Polish: Kobieta z...) is a 2023 drama film written and directed by Małgorzata Szumowska and Michał Englert. A coproduction between Poland and Sweden, it stars Małgorzata Hajewska-Krzysztofik, Joanna Kulig, Mateusz Więcławek and Bogumiła Bajor.

The film premiered at the 80th Venice International Film Festival on 8 September 2023, where it competed for the Golden Lion. It was theatrically released in Poland on 5 April 2024, and in Sweden on 4 October 2024.

== Premise ==
Spanning 45 years, the film focuses on Aniela, a husband and father in a small town in Poland, who starts to experience gender dysphoria.

== Cast ==
- Małgorzata Hajewska-Krzysztofik as Aniela
- Joanna Kulig as Iza
- Mateusz Więcławek as young Aniela
- Bogumiła Bajor as young Iza

== Production ==
The film was produced by No-Mad Films—a collaboration between Madants and Nowhere—and Plio Ltd., in co-production with Sweden's Film i Väst and Common Ground Pictures.

Speaking of the film, Szumowska and Englert said: "Kobieta z... is a really important film for us, the result of many years of work, countless meetings with transgender people – people of all ages who have lived in Poland for decades." They added: "We hope that our film will help others understand what it means to be transgender, while giving courage to hundreds of young people who identify as trans but are afraid to share it with others. Above all, we hope that it will increase support for changes in the law that will guarantee life without danger."

== Release ==
Woman Of... had its worldwide premiere at the 80th Venice International Film Festival on 8 September 2023, where it competed for the Golden Lion. It also screened at the 28th Busan International Film Festival in the 'World Cinema' section on 6 October 2023.

World sales are handled by Memento International. The film was theatrically released in Poland by Next Film on 5 April 2024. Lucky Dogs distributed the film in Sweden on 4 October 2024, under the title Jag är kvinna.

== Reception ==
=== Critical response ===
On the review aggregator website Rotten Tomatoes, the film holds an approval rating of 100% based on 9 reviews, with an average rating of 7.1/10.

=== Accolades ===
Award	Date of ceremony	Category	Recipient(s)	Result	Ref.
Polish Film Festival	28 September 2024	Main Competition	Bogna Szewczyk, Małgorzata Szumowska, Michał Englert, Klaudia Śmieja-Rostworowska	Nominated	
Göteborg Film Festival	4 February 2024	International Competition	Małgorzata Szumowska, Michał Englert	Nominated	
Guadalajara International Film Festival	15 June 2024	Maguey Award	Małgorzata Szumowska, Michał Englert	Nominated	
Munich Film Festival	7 July 2024	Cinemasters Competition	Małgorzata Szumowska, Michał Englert	Nominated	
Polish Film Awards	10 March 2025	Best Actress	Małgorzata Hajewska-Krzysztofik	Nominated	
Polish Film Awards	10 March 2025	Best Supporting Actress	Joanna Kulig	Nominated	
Polish Film Awards	10 March 2025	Best Cinematography	Michał Englert	Nominated	
Polish Film Awards	10 March 2025	Best Production Design	Marek Zawierucha	Nominated	
Polish Film Awards	10 March 2025	Best Editing	Jarosław Kamiński	Nominated	
Venice Film Festival	9 September 2023	Golden Lion	Małgorzata Szumowska, Michał Englert	Nominated	
Venice Film Festival	9 September 2023	Queer Lion	Małgorzata Szumowska, Michał Englert	Nominated	
