= Jolanta Wadowska-Król =

Polish pediatrician (1939–2023)

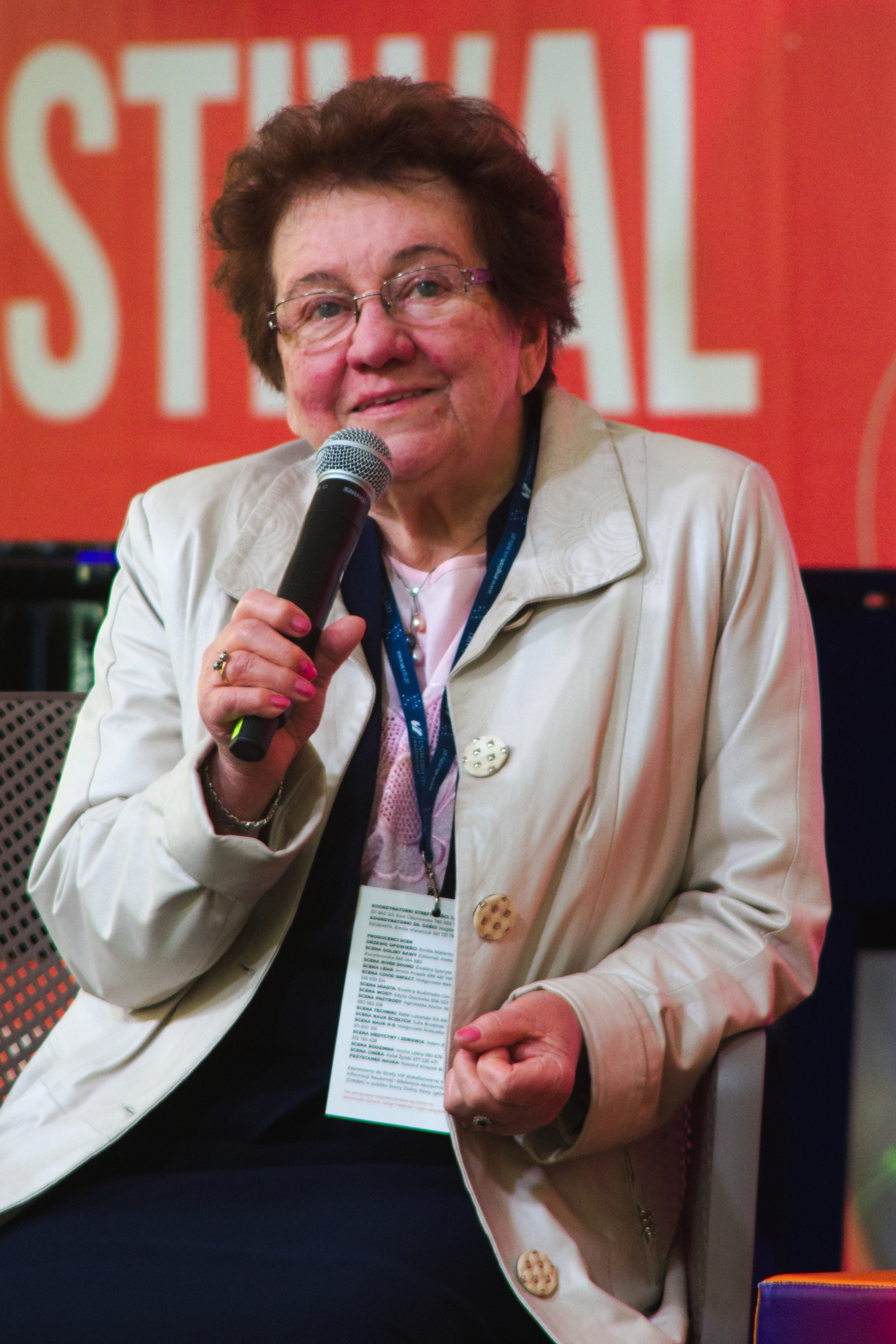
- Wadowska-Król in 2021
- Born: Jolanta Danuta Wadowska; 27 June 1939; Katowice, Poland
- Died: 18 June 2023 (aged 83); Katowice, Poland
- Education: Medical University of Silesia
- Occupation: Pediatrician

Jolanta Danuta Wadowska-Król (Polish pronunciation: [jɔˈlan.ta vaˈdɔf.ska ˈkrul]; 27 June 1939 – 18 June 2023) was a Polish pediatrician.

== Early life and education ==
Wadowska-Król was born in Katowice to father Piotr and mother Stanisława (née Chwist). After her mother was left partially blind from a lightning strike, she was sent to live with one of her aunts at the age of one. She attended the Medical University of Silesia, where she interned in internal medicine, surgery, gynecology, and pediatrics; she graduated in 1964.

== Career ==
Wadowska-Król began her career working at the Provincial Integrated Hospital in Katowice and a pediatric clinic in Dąbrówka Mała. In 1974, she referred a patient with recurring anemia to a pediatric clinic in Zabrze, which was run by Dr. Bożena Hager-Małecka, the Provincial Medical Consultant for Pediatrics in Silesia. After seeing the patient, Dr. Hager-Małecka advised Wadowska-Król to conduct secret tests on children in Szopienice, whom she suspected were suffering from lead poisoning from the nearby Szopienice Non-Ferrous Metals Smelter.

Together with nurse Wiesława Wilczek, Wadowska-Król began examining all children from Szopienice, Burowiec, and Dąbrówka Mała, and referred 50 to 70 children a day to laboratories to be tested for lead poisoning. Approximately 5,000 children were tested, 1,000 of whom were discovered to have lead poisoning and required immediate care. Children with more severe cases of lead poisoning were sent to the pediatric clinic in Zabrze, while children with less severe cases were sent to hospitals in Sosnowiec, Ligota, Załęże, and Janów. Due to limited hospital beds, a total of 2,000 children were eventually sent to sanatoriums in Istebna, Rabka, and Jaworze for treatment. As a result of Wadowska-Król's work, tenement houses near the smelter were demolished, and she helped displaced families with sick children find new homes. However, in an attempt to conceal the ecological disaster and maintain the image of the Polish People's Republic, Wadowska-Król was ordered by Polish authorities not to pursue any further action on the matter.

Wadowska-Król's research formed the basis of her doctoral dissertation, which was supervised by Dr. Hager-Małecka and completed in 1975. Upon review, however, the work was heavily criticized and censored. The dissertation was never published and Wadowska-Król chose not to pursue a doctorate any further, stating that she did not need it and only wanted to help children. She spent the rest of her career working as a pediatrician, and retired from medicine in 2011.

== Personal life and death ==
Wadowska-Król married Zbigniew Józef Król, an assistant professor at the Medical University of Silesia. She died on 18 June 2023 at the age of 83. Her funeral took place at the Basilica of St. Louis the King and the Assumption of the Blessed Virgin Mary in Ligota-Panewniki, and she was buried at the Panewnicka Street Cemetery.

== Legacy ==
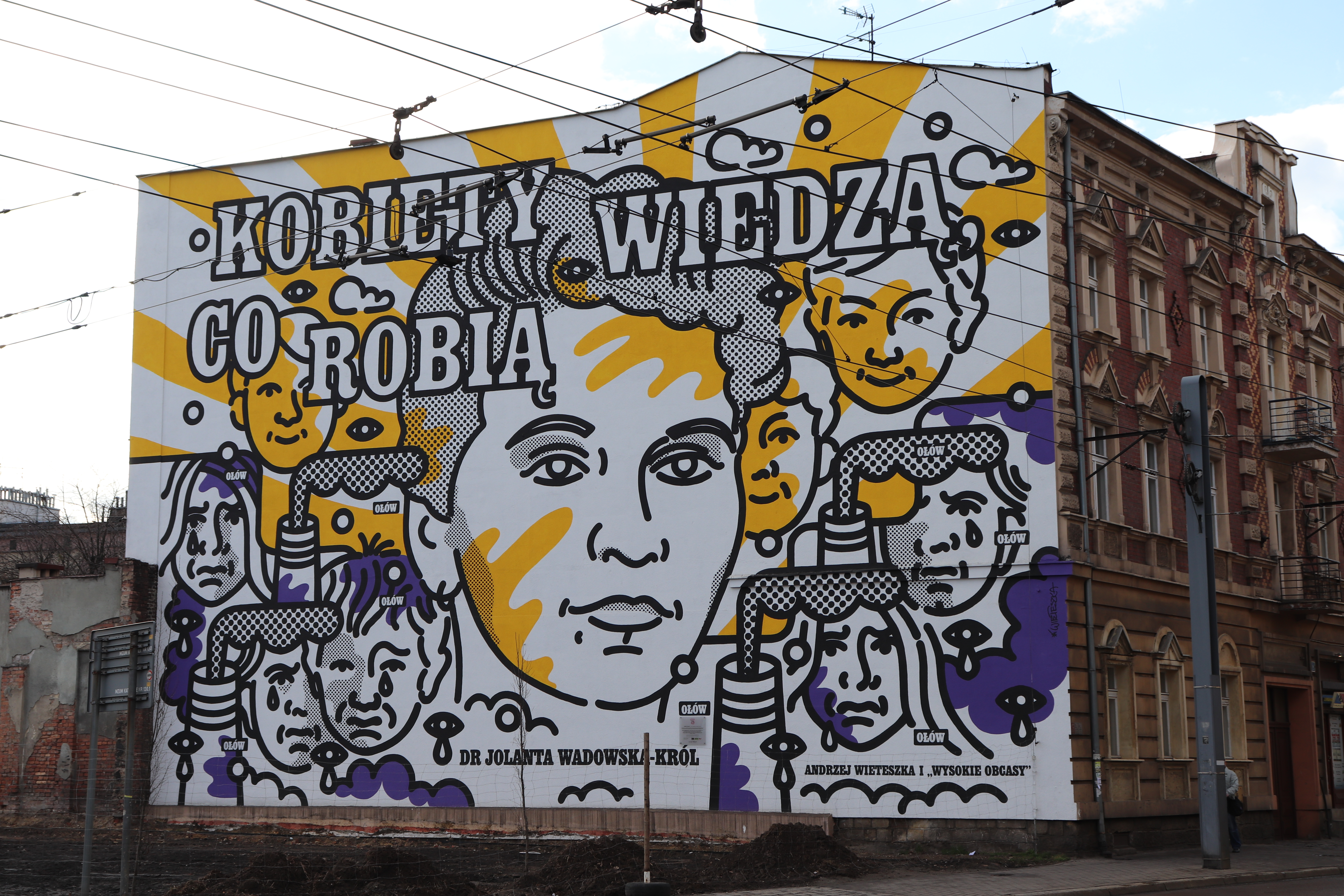
A mural in Wadowska-Król's honor was erected in her hometown of Katowice in 2018. It reads, "Women know what they are doing."

Wadowska-Król was named an Honorary Citizen of Katowice in 2017. The following year, she received the Wojciech Korfanty Award from the Upper Silesian Union, and a mural in her honor was unveiled on Gliwicka Street in Katowice. In 2021, she received an honorary doctorate from the University of Silesia in Katowice.

=== In popular culture ===
In October 2022, Wadowska-Król's granddaughter Agnieszka Cygan directed Our Lady of Szopienice, a play about her grandmother's work with lead-poisoned children. In February 2026, Netflix released the miniseries Lead Children about Wadowska-Król; her children and grandchildren were involved with the production of the series, with some making acting cameos as well. In the series, Wadowska-Król was played by Joanna Kulig.
