= Klaudia Śmieja-Rostworowska =

Polish film producer

- Born: Klaudia Śmieja
- Education: Jagiellonian University; University of Silesia in Katowice
- Occupation: Film producer
- Years active: 2014–present
- Children: 1

Klaudia Śmieja-Rostworowska is a Polish film producer. Her credits include Claire Denis's High Life (2018), Valdimar Jóhannsson's Lamb (2021), and Mona Fastvold's The Testament of Ann Lee (2025).

== Biography ==
Śmieja-Rostworowska graduated from the faculty of cultural studies at the Jagiellonian University and the faculty of television at the University of Silesia in Katowice. In 2015, she co-founded the production company Madants with Beata Rzezniczek. In 2018, she co-founded the production company NEM Corp with Ewa Puszczyńska and Jan Naszewski. She received the Female Voice Award at the Off Camera International Festival of Independent Cinema in 2022.

She has a daughter.

== Filmography ==
Year	Title	Director	Notes	Ref.
2014	The Mighty Angel	Wojciech Smarzowski	Executive producer	
2015	Warsaw by Night	Natalia Koryncka-Gruz	Executive producer	
2015	Sweet Home	Rafa Martínez	Executive producer	
2015	Rams	Grímur Hákonarson	Executive producer	
2015	Chemo	Bartosz Prokopowicz	Producer	
2016	The Innocents	Anne Fontaine	Co-producer	
2016	Illegitimate	Adrian Sitaru	Co-producer	
2016	Park	Sofia Exarchou	Co-producer	
2016	Clair Obscur	Yeşim Ustaoğlu	Co-producer	
2016	Porto	Gabe Klinger	Co-producer	
2017	Konwój	Maciej Żak	Executive producer	
2017	Under the Tree	Hafsteinn Gunnar Sigurðsson	Co-producer	
2017	Radiogram	Rouzie Hassanova	Co-producer	
2017	Foam at the Mouth	Jānis Nords	Co-producer	
2018	Pity	Babis Makridis	Producer	
2018	The River	Emir Baigazin	Co-producer	
2018	High Life	Claire Denis	Producer	
2019	Mr. Jones	Agnieszka Holland	Producer	
2020	Charlatan	Agnieszka Holland	Co-producer	
2021	Wolka	Árni Ólafur Ásgeirsson	Line producer	
2021	Lamb	Valdimar Jóhannsson	Producer	
2021	A Woman at Night	Rafael Kapeliński	Co-producer	
2021	Other People	Aleksandra Terpińska	Producer	
2021	The Wedding	Wojciech Smarzowski	Executive producer	
2022	Pamfir	Dmytro Sukholytkyy-Sobchuk	Producer	
2022	The Silent Twins	Agnieszka Smoczyńska	Producer	
2022	Fools	Tomasz Wasilewski	Executive producer	
2022	My Neighbor Adolf	Leon Prudovsky	Producer	
2022	Blanquita	Fernando Guzzoni	Executive producer	
2023	Housekeeping for Beginners	Goran Stolevski	Producer	
2023	Woman Of...	Małgorzata Szumowska, Michał Englert	Producer	
2023	Joika	James Napier Robertson	Producer	
2023	Ultima Thule	Klaudiusz Chrostowski	Producer	
2024	L'Homme aux mille visages	Sonia Kronlund	Co-producer	
2024	Better Man	Michael Gracey	Executive producer	
2024	The Brutalist	Brady Corbet	Executive producer	
2025	No Beast. So Fierce.	Burhan Qurbani	Producer	
2025	Orphan	László Nemes	Executive producer	
2025	The Testament of Ann Lee	Mona Fastvold	Producer	
2025	Sacrifice	Romain Gavras	Producer	
2025	The Fires	Ugla Hauksdóttir	Producer	
2026	Karma	Guillaume Canet	Producer	
2026	Paper Tiger	James Gray	Executive producer	
2026	Hot Spot	Agnieszka Smoczyńska	Producer	
2026	Wild, Wild East	Jan Holoubek	Producer	
TBA	Cavendish	Chris Andrews	Producer	
TBA	Twice Over	Alena Lodkina	Executive producer	

== Awards and nominations ==
Award	Year	Category	Nominated work	Result	Ref.
Gotham Awards	2025	Best Feature	The Testament of Ann Lee	Nominated	
Polish Film Awards	2023	Best Film	The Silent Twins	Nominated	
Polish Film Festival	2021	Best Film	Other People	Nominated	
Polish Film Festival	2022	Best Film	The Silent Twins	Won	
Polish Film Festival	2024	Best Film	Other People	Nominated	
