= Ewa Puszczyńska =

Polish film producer (born 1955)

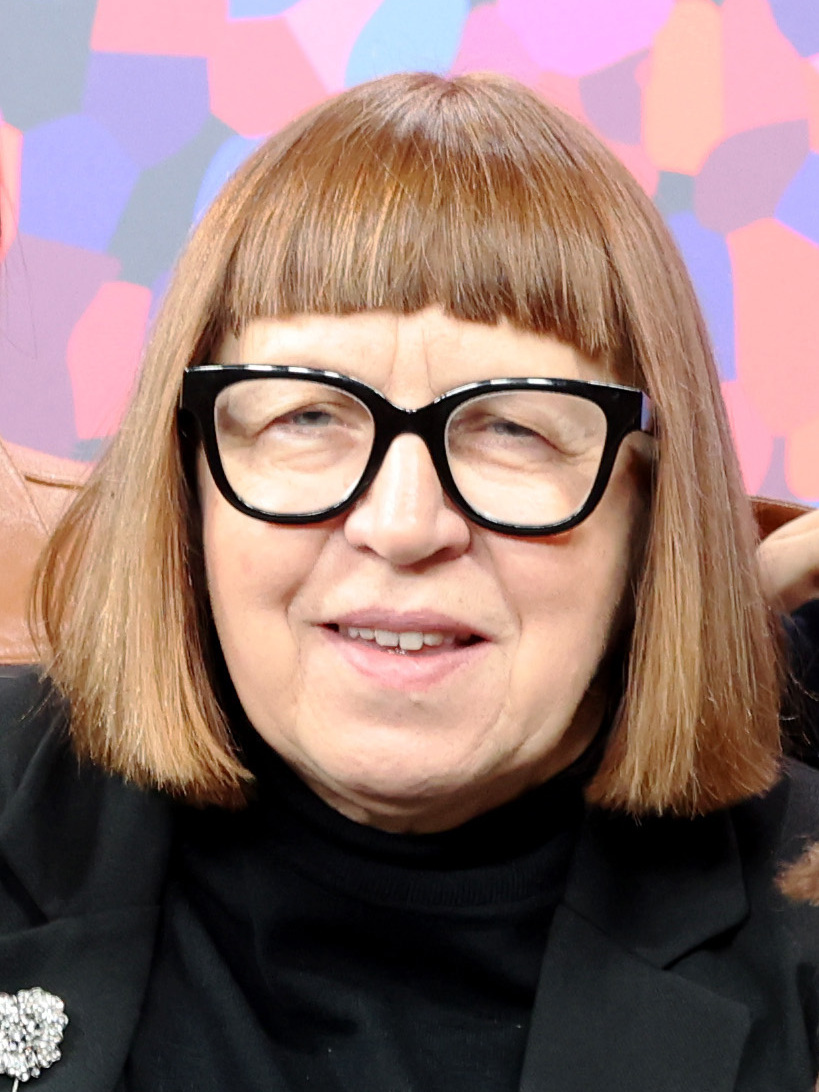
- Puszczyńska at the 2026 Berlin International Film Festival
- Born: 1955 (age 70–71); Łódź, Poland
- Education: University of Łódź
- Occupation: Film producer
- Years active: 2005–present
- Children: 2

Ewa Puszczyńska (Polish pronunciation: [ˈɛ.va puʂˈt͡ʂɘɲ.ska]; born 1955) is a Polish film and television producer. Her credits include Paweł Pawlikowski's Ida (2013) and Cold War (2018), Jonathan Glazer's The Zone of Interest (2023), and Jesse Eisenberg's A Real Pain (2024).

== Career ==
Puszczyńska studied English at the University of Łódź and began her career teaching English and translating dialogue for film and television. In 1995, she was offered an office job working for Piotr Dzięcioł at Opus Film, where she first began working as a producer.

In 2015, she founded Extreme Emotions, a production company co-managed with her daughter, Emilia. In 2018, she co-founded NEM Corp with Klaudia Śmieja-Rostworowska and Jan Naszewski. She served as a jury member for the 2018 Odesa International Film Festival and the 2024 Zurich Film Festival.

In January 2026, she was announced as a jury member for the main competition of the 76th Berlin International Film Festival. At the festival, journalist Tilo Jung asked jury president Wim Wenders about the absence of any criticism at the Biennale about the Gaza genocide, in light of the German government's support of the Israeli military and its role as the principal funder of the Biennale through the German Federal Government Commissioner for Culture and the Media. Puszczyńska answered first, saying that the question was "unfair" and that films should not be considered "political" in the traditional sense, and arguing that cinema is a "counterweight to politics."

== Personal life ==
Puszczyńska has two children.

== Filmography ==
=== Film ===
Year	Title	Director	Notes	Ref.
2005	Your Name Is Justine	Franco de Peña	Line producer	
2007	Spring 1941	Uri Barbash	Co-producer	
2008	Lekcje pana Kuki	Dariusz Gajewski		
2009	Zero	Paweł Borowski	Associate producer	
2010	King of Devil's Island	Marius Holst	Co-producer	
2012	Aglaja	Krisztina Deák		
2013	The Congress	Ari Folman		
2013	Ida	Paweł Pawlikowski		
2014	The Cut	Fatih Akin	Co-producer	
2016	Dark Crimes	Alexandros Avranas	Co-producer	
2016	Ewa	Haim Tabakman		
2017	Hostages	Rezo Gigineishvili	Co-producer	
2017	The Captain	Robert Schwentke	Co-producer	
2018	Cold War	Paweł Pawlikowski		
2020	Kill It and Leave This Town	Mariusz Wilczyński		
2020	Quo Vadis, Aida?	Jasmila Žbanić		
2022	The Silent Twins	Agnieszka Smoczyńska		
2022	June Zero	Jake Paltrow	Executive producer	
2022	Fools	Tomasz Wasilewski		
2023	Mammalia	Sebastian Mihăilescu	Co-producer	
2023	The Zone of Interest	Jonathan Glazer		
2024	A Real Pain	Jesse Eisenberg		
2025	Köln 75	Ido Fluk	Co-producer	
2026	Fatherland	Paweł Pawlikowski		
TBA	Safe and Silent	Justyna Tafel		
TBA	Wild, Wild East	Jan Holoubek		

=== Television ===
Year	Title	Network	Notes	Ref.
2014–2015	Zbrodnia	AXN		
2019	Ultraviolet	AXN		
TBA	Empty Mansions	HBO	Co-producer	
TBA	Piekło Kobiet	HBO Max		

== Awards and nominations ==
Award	Year	Category	Nominated work	Result	Ref.
British Academy Film Awards	2015	Best Film Not in the English Language	Ida	Won	
British Academy Film Awards	2019	Best Film Not in the English Language	Cold War	Nominated	
British Academy Film Awards	2024	Best Film Not in the English Language	The Zone of Interest	Won	
British Academy Film Awards	2024	Outstanding British Film	The Zone of Interest	Won	
British Independent Film Awards	2018	Best International Independent Film	Cold War	Nominated	
European Film Awards	2014	Best Film	Ida	Won	
European Film Awards	2018	Best Film	Cold War	Won	
European Film Awards	2023	Best Film	The Zone of Interest	Nominated	
Gotham Awards	2023	Best International Feature	The Zone of Interest	Nominated	
Polish Film Awards	2023	Best Film	The Silent Twins	Nominated	
Polish Film Awards	2025	Best Film	The Zone of Interest	Nominated	
Polish Film Festival	2022	Best Film	Fools	Nominated	
Polish Film Festival	2022	Best Film	The Silent Twins	Won	
