= Wednesday, Thursday Morning =

2007 film by Grzegorz Pacek

- Film poster
- Polish: Środa, czwartek rano
- Directed by: Grzegorz Pacek
- Written by: Grzegorz Pacek
- Produced by: Janusz Chodnikiewicz
- Starring: Joanna Kulig; Paweł Tomaszewski
- Cinematography: Bogumił Godfrejów
- Edited by: Rafał Listopad
- Production company: Wytwórnia Filmowa Czołówka
- Distributed by: Film Polski
- Release dates: 17 September 2007 (FPFF); 8 February 2008 (Poland)
- Running time: 71 minutes
- Country: Poland
- Language: Polish

Wednesday, Thursday Morning (Polish: Środa, czwartek rano) is a 2007 Polish drama film directed by Grzegorz Pacek. Starring Joanna Kulig and Paweł Tomaszewski, it premiered at the Polish Film Festival on 17 September 2007, and was theatrically released in Poland on 8 February 2008.

The film was nominated for the Polish Academy Award for Best Film Score, and Kulig received an award for Acting Debut at the Polish Film Festival for her performance.

== Synopsis ==
On August 1, the anniversary of the 1944 Warsaw Uprising, two young people, lost and alone, are looking for happiness and their way in life.

== Cast ==
- Joanna Kulig as Teresa
- Paweł Tomaszewski as Tomek
- Jadwiga Jankowska-Cieślak as Ewa
- Janusz Chabior as “Pała”
- Eryk Lubos as “Rumun”
- Rafał Maćkowiak as bodyguard
