= Wild, Wild East =

2026 Polish war drama film

- Theatrical release poster
- Polish: Dziki, dziki wschód
- Directed by: Jan Holoubek
- Screenplay by: Aleksandra Takuska
- Produced by: Bogna Szewczyk-Skupień; Klaudia Śmieja-Rostworowska; Ewa Puszczyńska; Jan Holoubek
- Starring: Itay Tiran; Joanna Kulig
- Cinematography: Bartłomiej Kaczmarek
- Edited by: Rafał Listopad
- Music by: Jan Komar
- Production companies: Extreme Emotions film; Madants; Holograph; TVN Warner Bros. Discovery
- Distributed by: Warner Bros. Pictures
- Release dates: 14 September 2026 (TIFF); 8 January 2027 (Poland)
- Running time: 105 minutes
- Country: Poland
- Languages: Polish; German; Ukrainian

Wild, Wild East (Polish: Dziki, dziki wschód) is a 2026 war drama film directed by Jan Holoubek. The film, set in occupied Poland in 1943, follows Martin Wolff, a German official sent to a remote village to investigate the disappearance of a Jewish lawyer.

The film had its world premiere in the Platform section of the 2026 Toronto International Film Festival on 14 September 2026, where it competed for the Platform Prize.

== Synopsis ==
In 1943, the small Polish village of Zalesie Małe is tense and afraid under German rule. German officers, local opportunists, and frightened villagers survive by keeping quiet and pretending life is normal. When Martin Wolff, a German officer, arrives to look into the disappearance of a Jewish lawyer, this fragile calm breaks. Whispers about missing papers and hidden treasure revive old grudges. As secrets come out, people’s identities blur and loyalties change, turning the village into a place of betrayal and desperate survival. And Wolff himself carries a secret far more dangerous than any treasure.

== Cast ==
- Itay Tiran
- Joanna Kulig
- Robert Więckiewicz
- Jan Bülow
- Piotr Trojan
- Janusz Chabior
- Jacek Beler
- Magdalena Różczka

== Production ==
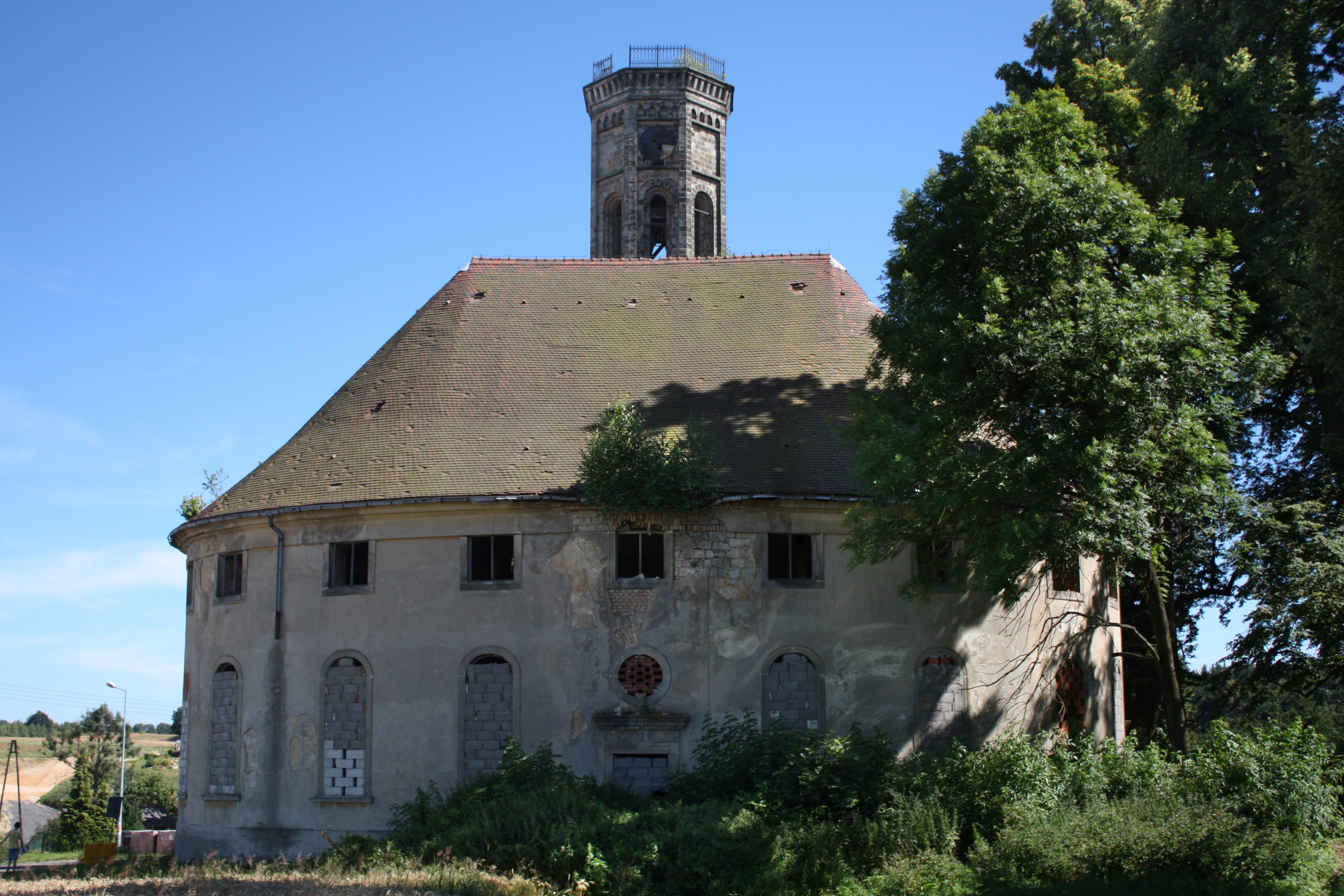
Evangelical Church in Żeliszów

Principal photography began in October 2025 in Poland and Latvia.

The film was shot primarily in Lower Silesia and in and around Wrocław. Filming locations included the historic Evangelical Church in Żeliszów and the palace in Moja Wola, Greater Poland Voivodeship. The film was wrapped up by the end of 2025.

== Release ==
Wild, Wild East had its world premiere at the 2026 Toronto International Film Festival on 14 September 2026, in the Platform section.

Subsequently it will compete in the Main Competition of the Polish Film Festival on September 21, 2026 in Gdynia.

Global Constellation, a pan-European international film and television sales and financing company, acquired the international sales rights to the film in 2025.

== Accolades ==
Award	Date of ceremony	Category	Recipient(s)	Result	Ref.
Toronto International Film Festival	20 September 2026	Platform Prize	Wild, Wild East	Nominated	
Polish Film Festival	26 September 2026	Golden Lions	Wild, Wild East	Nominated	
