= Disco Polo (film) =

2015 film by Maciej Bochniak

- Theatrical release poster
- Directed by: Maciej Bochniak
- Written by: Maciej Bochniak; Mateusz Kościukiewicz
- Produced by: Stanisław Tyczyński
- Starring: Dawid Ogrodnik; Piotr Głowacki; Joanna Kulig; Tomasz Kot
- Cinematography: Tomasz Naumiuk
- Edited by: Jarosław Barzan
- Production company: Alvernia Studios
- Distributed by: Next Film
- Release date: 27 February 2015 (Poland)
- Running time: 103 minutes
- Country: Poland
- Language: Polish
- Box office: $4.3 million

Disco Polo is a Polish musical comedy film directed by Maciej Bochniak. Released on 27 February 2015 in Poland, it grossed $4.3 million, and was the eleventh most popular film of 2015 in Polish cinemas attracting an audience of 877,000.

== Synopsis ==
Young wannabe musicians from the province decide to write hit song and gain the top of the charts in order to become legends of disco polo.

== Cast ==
- Dawid Ogrodnik as Tomek
- Piotr Głowacki as Rudy
- Joanna Kulig as Anka "Gensonina"
- Tomasz Kot as Daniel Polak
