= Cold War (2018 film) =

2018 film by Paweł Pawlikowski

- Theatrical release poster
- Polish: Zimna wojna
- Directed by: Paweł Pawlikowski
- Written by: Paweł Pawlikowski; Janusz Głowacki; Piotr Borkowski
- Produced by: Tanya Seghatchian; Ewa Puszczyńska
- Starring: Joanna Kulig; Tomasz Kot; Borys Szyc; Agata Kulesza; Cédric Kahn; Jeanne Balibar
- Cinematography: Łukasz Żal
- Edited by: Jarosław Kamiński
- Production companies: Opus Film; Polish Film Institute; mk2 Films; Film4; BFI; Protagonist Pictures; Apocalypso Pictures; MK Productions (Note: Opus Film, Polish Film Institute, MK2 Films, Film4, BFI, Protagonist Pictures, Apocalypso Pictures, MK Productions, Eurimages, Arte France Cinéma, Canal+ Poland, Kino Świat, The Lódz Film Fund, Mazovia and Warsaw Film Fund, The Silesian Film Fund, The Podkarpackie Film Fund, Arte France, Aide aux cinémas du monde and the Cinestaan Film Company are all credited as production companies.)
- Distributed by: Kino Świat (Poland); Diaphana Films (France); Curzon Artificial Eye (United Kingdom)
- Release dates: 10 May 2018 (Cannes); 8 June 2018 (Poland); 31 August 2018 (United Kingdom); 24 October 2018 (France)
- Running time: 88 minutes
- Countries: Poland; France; United Kingdom
- Languages: Polish; French
- Budget: €4.3 million (~US$4.8 million)
- Box office: $25 million

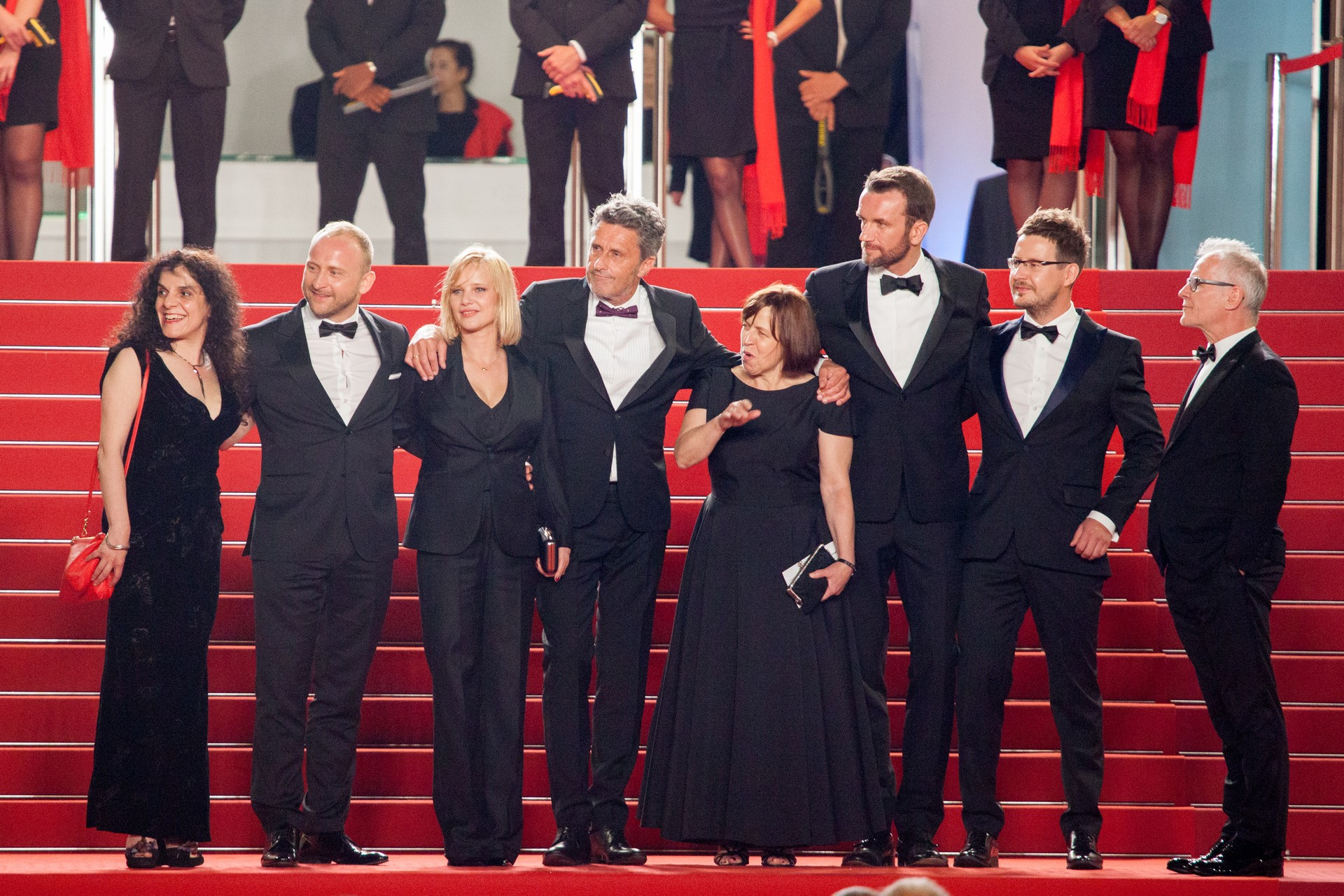
The cast and crew of Cold War during the film's premiere at the 2018 Cannes Film Festival

Cold War (Polish: Zimna wojna [ʑimna vojna]) is a 2018 historical romantic drama film directed by Paweł Pawlikowski, who co-wrote the screenplay with Janusz Głowacki and Piotr Borkowski. It is an international co-production by producers in Poland, France and the United Kingdom. Set in Poland and France during the Cold War from the late 1940s until the 1960s, the story follows a musical director (Tomasz Kot) who discovers a young singer (Joanna Kulig), exploring their subsequent love story over the years. The film, which was loosely inspired by the lives of Pawlikowski's parents, also features Borys Szyc, Agata Kulesza, Cédric Kahn and Jeanne Balibar in supporting roles.

Cold War premiered at the 2018 Cannes Film Festival on 10 May 2018. Critics praised its acting, direction, screenplay, and cinematography. The film received numerous accolades, including three nominations at the 91st Academy Awards (Best Foreign Language Film, Best Director and Best Cinematography) and four at the 72nd BAFTA Film Awards, as well as six awards from seven nominations at the 31st European Film Awards, winning the main Best Film Award.

== Plot ==
In post-World War II Poland, director and composer Wiktor, manager Kaczmarek, and choreographer Irena are holding auditions for a state-sponsored folk music ensemble. Wiktor's attention is immediately captured by Zula, an ambitious and captivating young woman who is faking a peasant identity and is on probation after attacking her abusive father. Wiktor and Zula quickly develop a strong, obsessive attraction and have sex following a performance. Wiktor and Irena are pressured by bureaucrats to include pro-Communist and pro-Stalinist propaganda in their performances—in exchange, the troupe would be allowed to tour the Eastern Bloc. Wiktor and Irena oppose this, but the career-driven, opportunistic Kaczmarek agrees, and a resentful Irena quits. Kaczmarek is also interested in Zula and pressures her into spying on Wiktor for him, but Zula does not reveal any incriminating information. When the ensemble visits East Berlin, Wiktor plans to flee to the West with Zula, and the two affirm their love and passion. Zula fails to come to the rendezvous with Wiktor, and he crosses the border alone.

Years later, Zula meets Wiktor in Paris, where he is working at a jazz club. They both have other partners, but their continued mutual attraction is clear. When Wiktor asks Zula why she failed to appear with him to cross the border, she says that she lacked confidence in herself. A year later, Wiktor attends one of the troupe's performances in Yugoslavia, where Zula spots him in the audience and becomes visibly shaken. Two years later, Wiktor is working as a film score composer in Paris, where Zula reunites with him. She has married another man to obtain a visa so that she could travel to Paris and be with Wiktor. Wiktor attempts to build a singing career for Zula. He embellishes her backstory to make her more interesting to film producer Michel, which annoys Zula. Zula becomes jealous of Wiktor's past lovers, and as work on her record strains their relationship, she begins to drink heavily and misbehave in public. Wiktor and Zula finish Zula's record, but a disappointed Zula remains frustrated and unhappy. She reveals that she had an affair with Michel and insults Wiktor, and he strikes her. She later disappears, and Wiktor confronts Michel, who states she has returned to Poland.

Against the advice of a Polish embassy official in Paris, Wiktor returns to Poland. Zula meets with him at a work camp, where he reveals that he has been sentenced to a "generous" 15 years of hard labor on charges of defecting and espionage; his hand is visibly disfigured. Zula bribes a guard for time alone with him, and promises to free him. Five years later, a freed Wiktor meets with Kaczmarek at a club where Zula, now a barely-functioning alcoholic, is performing. Zula arranged for an early release for Wiktor by agreeing to marry Kaczmarek, and now has a 4 year old son; Kaczmarek is unsure his son looks like him. Wiktor and Zula escape to a bathroom together, where a miserable and defeated Zula begs Wiktor to rescue her. The two take a bus to an abandoned church seen at the beginning of the film, where they exchange marriage vows and seemingly prepare to commit suicide together. After ingesting pills, the couple is seen sitting outside, observing the landscape. Zula suggests they view it "from the other side," and the two stand and depart from view, as wheat fields sway in the wind.

== Cast ==
- Joanna Kulig as Zuzanna "Zula" Lichoń
- Tomasz Kot as Wiktor Warski
- Borys Szyc as Lech Kaczmarek
- Agata Kulesza as Irena Bielecka
- Cédric Kahn as Michel
- Jeanne Balibar as Juliette
- Adam Woronowicz as consul
- Adam Ferency as minister

== Reception and accolades ==
=== Box office ===
Cold War grossed $4.6 million in the United States and Canada, and $20.5 million in other territories, for a worldwide total of $25 million.

In the film's opening weekend in the United States it made $54,353 from three theaters, an average of $18,118 per venue. In its sixth weekend of release, following its three Oscar nominations, the film made $571,650 from 111 theaters.

=== Critical response ===
On review aggregator website Rotten Tomatoes, the film holds an approval rating of 92% based on 255 reviews, and an average rating of 8.3/10. The website's critical consensus reads, "With a brilliantly stark visual aesthetic to match its lean narrative, Cold War doesn't waste a moment of its brief running time — and doesn't skimp on its bittersweet emotional impact." Metacritic gives the film a weighted average score of 90 out of 100, based on 45 critics, indicating "universal acclaim".

Giuseppe Sedia of the Krakow Post wrote, "...less hieratic than Ida, Cold War has a lot to offer to the audience. Maybe Pawlikowski would have not won Best Director Award at Cannes if it wasn't for the sumptuous acting displayed in this cruel, jazz-drenched and Mizoguchi-esque tale of two lovers". Writing in The Guardian, Peter Bradshaw wrote that this is a "musically glorious and visually ravishing film" that "is about the dark heart of Poland itself".

In 2025, it was one of the films voted for the "Readers' Choice" edition of The New York Times' list of "The 100 Best Movies of the 21st Century," finishing at number 295.

=== Awards and nominations ===
Award	Category	Recipient(s)	Result	Ref.
Academy Awards	Best Director	Paweł Pawlikowski	Nominated	
Academy Awards	Best Foreign Language Film	Poland	Nominated	
Academy Awards	Best Cinematography	Łukasz Żal	Nominated	
Alliance of Women Film Journalists	Best Non-English Film	Cold War	Nominated	
American Society of Cinematographers	Outstanding Cinematography	Łukasz Żal	Won	
Belgian Film Critics Association	Grand Prix	Cold War	Won	
BAFTA Awards	Best Direction	Paweł Pawlikowski	Nominated	
BAFTA Awards	Best Original Screenplay	Janusz Głowacki and Paweł Pawlikowski	Nominated	
BAFTA Awards	Best Film Not in the English Language	Cold War	Nominated	
BAFTA Awards	Best Cinematography	Łukasz Żal	Nominated	
British Independent Film Awards	Best International Independent Film	Paweł Pawlikowski, Janusz Głowacki, Ewa Puszczyńska, and Tanya Seghatchian	Nominated	
Cannes Film Festival	Best Director	Paweł Pawlikowski	Won	
Cannes Film Festival	Palme d'Or	Paweł Pawlikowski	Nominated	
Chicago Film Critics Association	Best Foreign Language Film	Cold War	Nominated	
Chicago Film Critics Association	Best Cinematography	Łukasz Żal	Nominated	
Critics' Choice Awards	Best Foreign Language Film	Cold War	Nominated	
Dallas–Fort Worth Film Critics Association	Best Foreign Language Film	Cold War	Runner-up	
European Film Awards	Best Film	Cold War	Won	
European Film Awards	Best Director	Paweł Pawlikowski	Won	
European Film Awards	Best Screenwriter	Paweł Pawlikowski	Won	
European Film Awards	Best Actress	Joanna Kulig	Won	
European Film Awards	Best Actor	Tomasz Kot	Nominated	
European Film Awards	Best Editor	Jarosław Kamiński	Won	
European Film Awards	People's Choice Award	Cold War	Won	
Film Fest Gent	Grand Prix	Cold War	Won	
Florida Film Critics Circle	Best Cinematography	Łukasz Żal	Won	
Gaudí Awards	Best European Film	Cold War	Won	
Goya Awards	Best European Film	Cold War	Won	
Guldbagge Awards	Best Foreign Film	Paweł Pawlikowski	Nominated	
Houston Film Critics Society	Best Foreign Language Film	Cold War	Nominated	
Location Managers Guild Awards	Outstanding Locations in Period Film	Bartosz Bednarz and Michał Śliwkiewicz	Nominated	
National Board of Review	Best Foreign Language Film	Cold War	Won	
New York Film Critics Circle	Best Foreign Language Film	Cold War	Won	
New York Film Critics Online	Best Foreign Language Film	Cold War	Won	
Polish Film Awards	Best Film	Cold War	Won	
Polish Film Awards	Best Director	Paweł Pawlikowski	Won	
Polish Film Awards	Best Actor	Tomasz Kot	Nominated	
Polish Film Awards	Best Actress	Joanna Kulig	Won	
Polish Film Awards	Best Supporting Actor	Borys Szyc	Nominated	
Polish Film Awards	Best Supporting Actress	Agata Kulesza	Nominated	
Polish Film Awards	Best Screenplay	Paweł Pawlikowski and Janusz Głowacki	Won	
Polish Film Awards	Best Cinematography	Łukasz Żal	Won	
Polish Film Awards	Best Production Design	Katarzyna Sobańska and Marcel Sławiński	Nominated	
Polish Film Awards	Best Costume Design	Aleksandra Staszko	Nominated	
Polish Film Awards	Best Editing	Jarosław Kamiński	Won	
Polish Film Awards	Best Sound	Maciej Pawłowski and Mirosław Makowski	Won	
San Diego Film Critics Society	Best Foreign Language Film	Cold War	Nominated	
San Francisco Bay Area Film Critics Circle	Best Foreign Language Film	Cold War	Nominated	
San Francisco Bay Area Film Critics Circle	Best Cinematography	Łukasz Żal	Nominated	
Satellite Awards	Best Foreign Language Film	Cold War	Nominated	
Satellite Awards	Best Cinematography	Łukasz Żal	Nominated	
Toronto Film Critics Association	Best Foreign Language Film	Cold War	Runner-up	
Washington D.C. Area Film Critics Association	Best Foreign Language Film	Cold War	Nominated	

== Stage adaptation ==
The film was adapted into a play by Conor McPherson. It was performed in London at the Almeida Theatre in 2023 and was directed by Rupert Goold.

== See also ==
- List of submissions to the 91st Academy Awards for Best Foreign Language Film
- List of Polish Academy Award winners and nominees
- List of Polish submissions for the Academy Award for Best International Feature Film
