= Lasting =

- Film poster
- Polish: Nieulotne
- Directed by: Jacek Borcuch
- Written by: Jacek Borcuch
- Produced by: Piotr Kobus; Agnieszka Drewno
- Starring: Magdalena Berus; Jakub Gierszał; Ángela Molina; Joanna Kulig
- Edited by: Beata Walentowska
- Music by: Daniel Bloom
- Production companies: Mańana, Espiral Producciones S.A.
- Distributed by: Kino Świat
- Release date: 19 January 2013
- Running time: 93 minutes
- Country: Poland
- Language: Polish

Lasting (Polish: Nieulotne) is a 2013 Polish drama film directed and written by Jacek Borcuch.

== Plot ==
Lasting is an emotional love story about Michał and Karina, a pair of Polish students who meet and fall in love while working summer jobs in Spain. An unexpected nightmare brutally breaks into their carefree time in the heavenly landscape and throws their lives into chaos.

== Cast ==
- Magdalena Berus as Karina
- Jakub Gierszał as Michał
- Ángela Molina as Elena
- Joanna Kulig as Marta
- Juanjo Ballesta as Joaquín
- Andrzej Chyra as Karina's father

== Awards ==
- Sundance Film Festival Cinematography Award – Michał Englert
