= Małgorzata Hajewska-Krzysztofik =

Polish actress (born 1965)

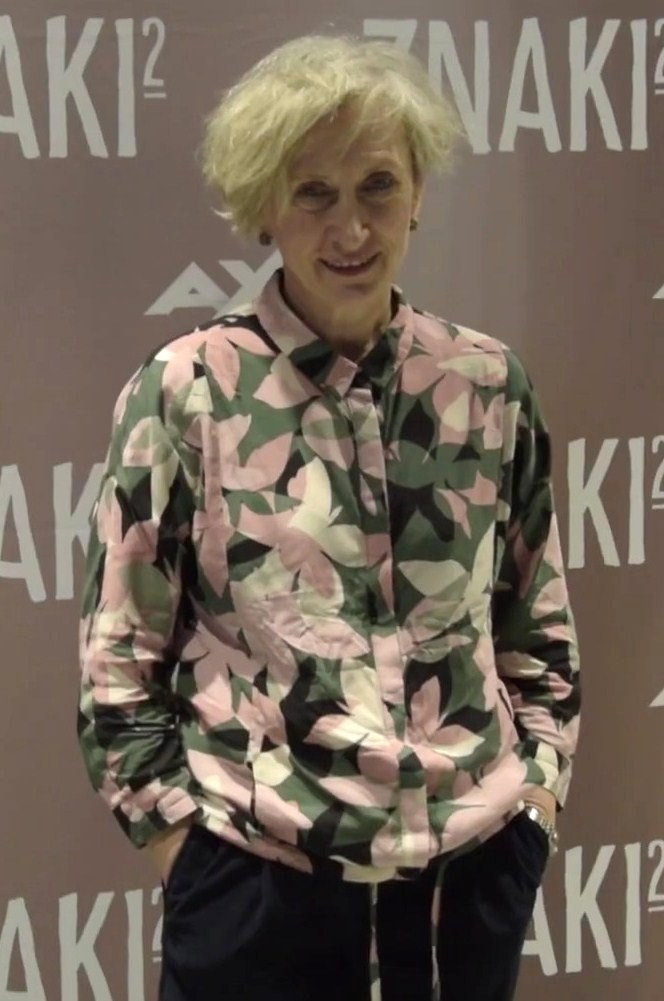
- Hajewska-Krzysztofik in 2020
- Born: 14 September 1965 (age 60); Sosnowiec, Poland
- Education: AST National Academy of Theatre Arts in Kraków
- Occupation: Actress
- Years active: 1991–present
- Children: 4

Małgorzata Hajewska-Krzysztofik (born 14 September 1965) is a Polish actress.

== Biography ==
Hajewska-Krzysztofik was born in Sosnowiec. Her mother was a nurse and her father was a miner. She has one brother. She stated that her father was an alcoholic and physically abusive toward her in her youth.

After completing her primary education, she applied to an agricultural technical school in Pszczyna, but was not accepted. She instead attended Bolesław Prus High School in Sosnowiec, and later the AST National Academy of Theatre Arts in Kraków, from which she graduated in 1988. She began her career working at the Helena Modrzejewska National Old Theatre in Kraków, before moving the New Theatre in Warsaw in 2016. In 2024, she starred as Aniela, a woman with gender dysphoria, in the film Woman Of..., a role which earned her a nomination for the Polish Academy Award for Best Actress.

=== Personal life ===
Hajewska-Krzysztofik is a recovering alcoholic. She has four daughters: Katarzyna, Martyna, Marianna, and Kalina.

== Filmography ==
=== Film ===
Year	Title	Role	Ref.
1991	Śmierć dziecioroba	Malina	
1991	Femina	Głucha	
1994	Śmierć jak kromka chleba	Ania	
1996	Miss Nobody	Madwoman	
2000	Szczęśliwy człowiek	Marta	
2006	What the Sun Has Seen	Marta's mother	
2008	33 Scenes from Life	Basia	
2015	Body	Karol's mother	
2017	Panic Attack	Krystyna	
2021	Prime Time	Laura	
2021	Jakoś to będzie	Jacek's mother	
2022	Iluzja	Janina	
2022	Śubuk	Psychologist	
2022	Delivery by Christmas	Graża	
2023	Woman of...	Aniela	
2024	Travel Essentials	Karolina	

=== Television ===
Year	Title	Role	Notes	Ref.
2014–2017	The Border	Krystyna	5 episodes	
2018–2019	Pod powierzchnią	Commissioner Maria Byszewska	14 episodes	
2018–2020	Signs	Zofia Bławatska	14 episodes	
2023	Feedback	Jadzia Rustowicz	4 episodes	
2024	Detective Forst	Halina Sznajderman	6 episodes	
2026	The Doll	Zasławska		
