= Spider behavior =

Type of animal behavior

Spider behavior refers to the range of behaviors and activities performed by spiders. Spiders are air-breathing arthropods that have eight legs and chelicerae with fangs that inject venom. They are the largest order of arachnids and rank seventh in total species diversity among all other groups of organisms which is reflected in their large diversity of behavior.

== Diet ==
Almost all known spider species are predators, mostly preying on insects and on other spiders, although a few species also take vertebrates such as frogs, lizards, fish, and even birds and bats. Spiders' guts are too narrow to take solids, and they liquidize their food by flooding it with digestive enzymes and grinding it with the bases of their pedipalps, as they do not have true jaws.

Though most known spiders are almost exclusively carnivorous, a few species, primarily of jumping spiders, supplement their diet with plant matter such as sap, nectar, and pollen. However, most of these spiders still need a mostly carnivorous diet to survive, and lab studies have shown that they become unhealthy when fed only plants. One exception is a species of jumping spider called Bagheera kiplingi, which is largely herbivorous, feeding mainly on the sugar rich Beltian bodies produced by acacia plants.

=== Capturing prey ===
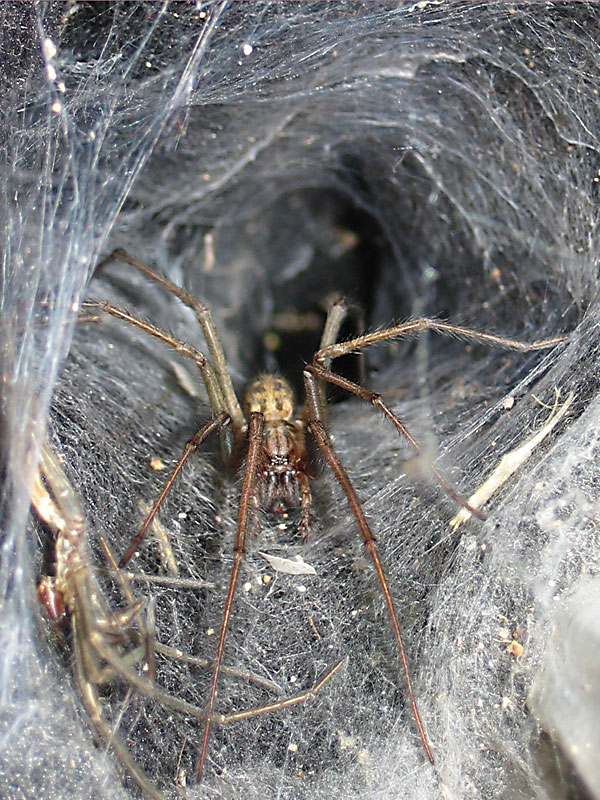
The web of a funnel-web spider Tegenaria duellica

Many spiders, but not all, build webs. Other spiders use a wide variety of methods to capture prey.

Web: There are several recognised types of spider web

- Spiral orb webs, associated primarily with the family Araneidae
- Tangle webs or cobwebs, associated with the family Theridiidae
- Funnel webs,
- Tubular webs, which run up the bases of trees or along the ground
- Sheet webs

The net-casting spider weaves a small net which it attaches to its front legs. It then lurks in wait for potential prey and when such prey arrives, lunges forward to wrap its victim in the net, bite and paralyze it. Hence, this spider expends less energy catching prey than a primitive hunter and also avoids the energy loss of weaving a large orb web.

Bolas: Bolas spiders are unusual orb-weaver spiders that do not spin the webs. Instead, they hunt by using a sticky 'capture blob' of silk on the end of a line, known as a 'bolas'. By swinging the bolas at flying male moths or moth flies nearby, the spider may snag its prey rather like a fisherman snagging a fish on a hook. Because of this, they are also called angling or fishing spider. The prey is lured to the spider by the production of up to three pheromone analogues.

Hunting on land: Jumping spiders, Wolf spiders and many other types of spiders hunt freely. Some of these have enhanced eyesight, sometimes approaching that of a pigeon (although with a much smaller field of vision). They are generally robust and agile. Some are opportunistic hunters pouncing upon prey as they find it or even chasing it over short distances. Some will wait for passing prey in or near the mouth of a burrow.

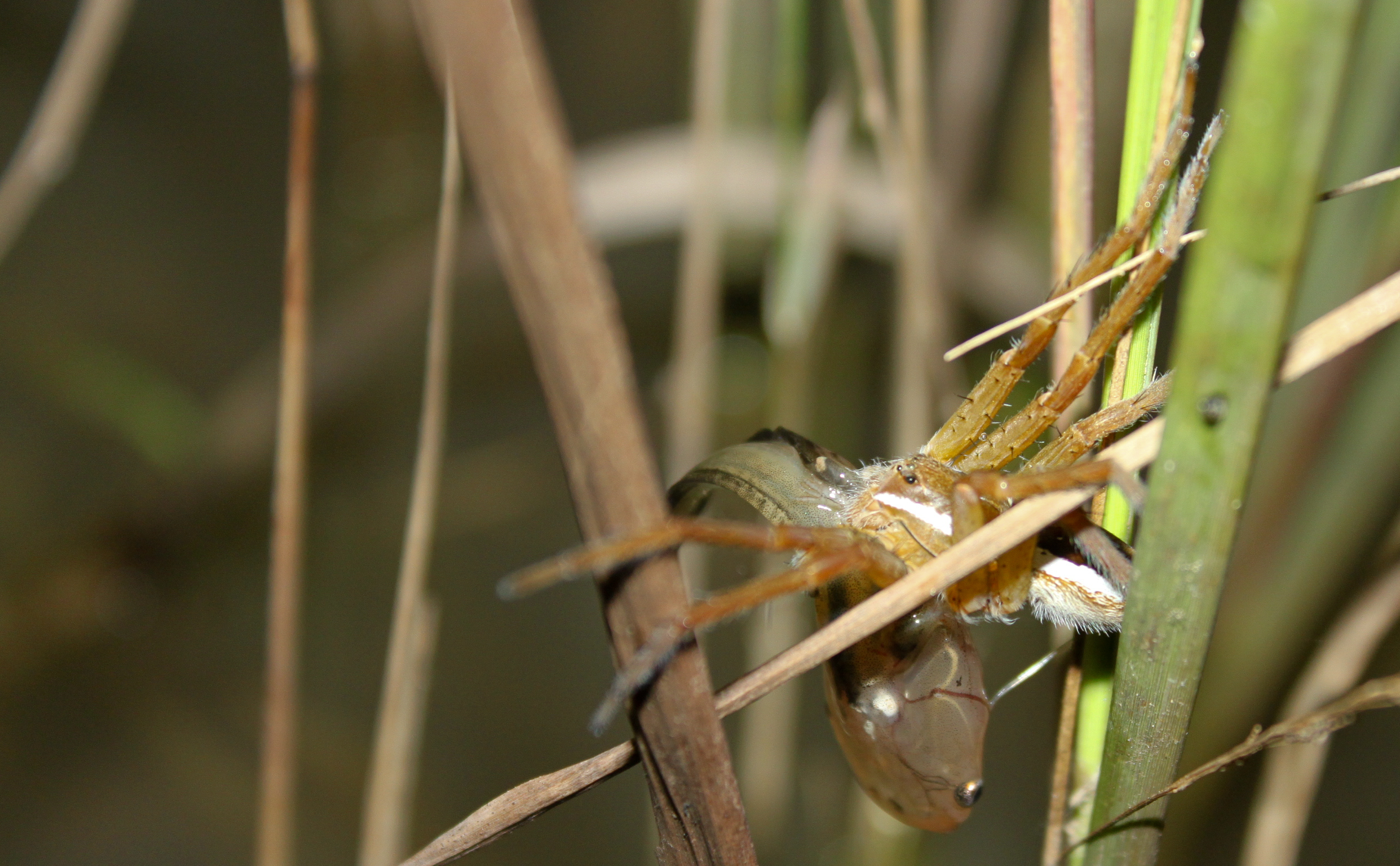
Fishing spider with its prey, a Cameroon Clawed Frog tadpole

Hunting on water: Dolomedes spiders hunt by waiting at the edge of a pool or stream. They hold on to the shore with their back legs while the rest of their body lies on the water, with legs stretched out. When they detect the ripples from prey, they run across the surface to subdue it using their foremost legs, which are tipped with small claws; like other spiders they then inject venom with their hollow jaws to kill and digest the prey. They mainly eat insects, but some larger species are able to catch small fish.

Female water spiders (Argyroneta aquatica) build underwater "diving bell" webs which they fill with air and use for digesting prey, molting, mating and raising offspring. They live almost entirely within the bells, darting out to catch prey animals that touch the bell or the threads that anchor it.

Deception: Some spiders hunt other spiders using deception; the jumping spider Portia mimics the movement of captured insect prey on the webs of other spiders. This attracts the owner of the web whereupon Portia pounces and overwhelms the owner. The Australian crab spider (Thomisus spectabilis) manipulates UV signals to attract bees to flowers in which they are hiding.

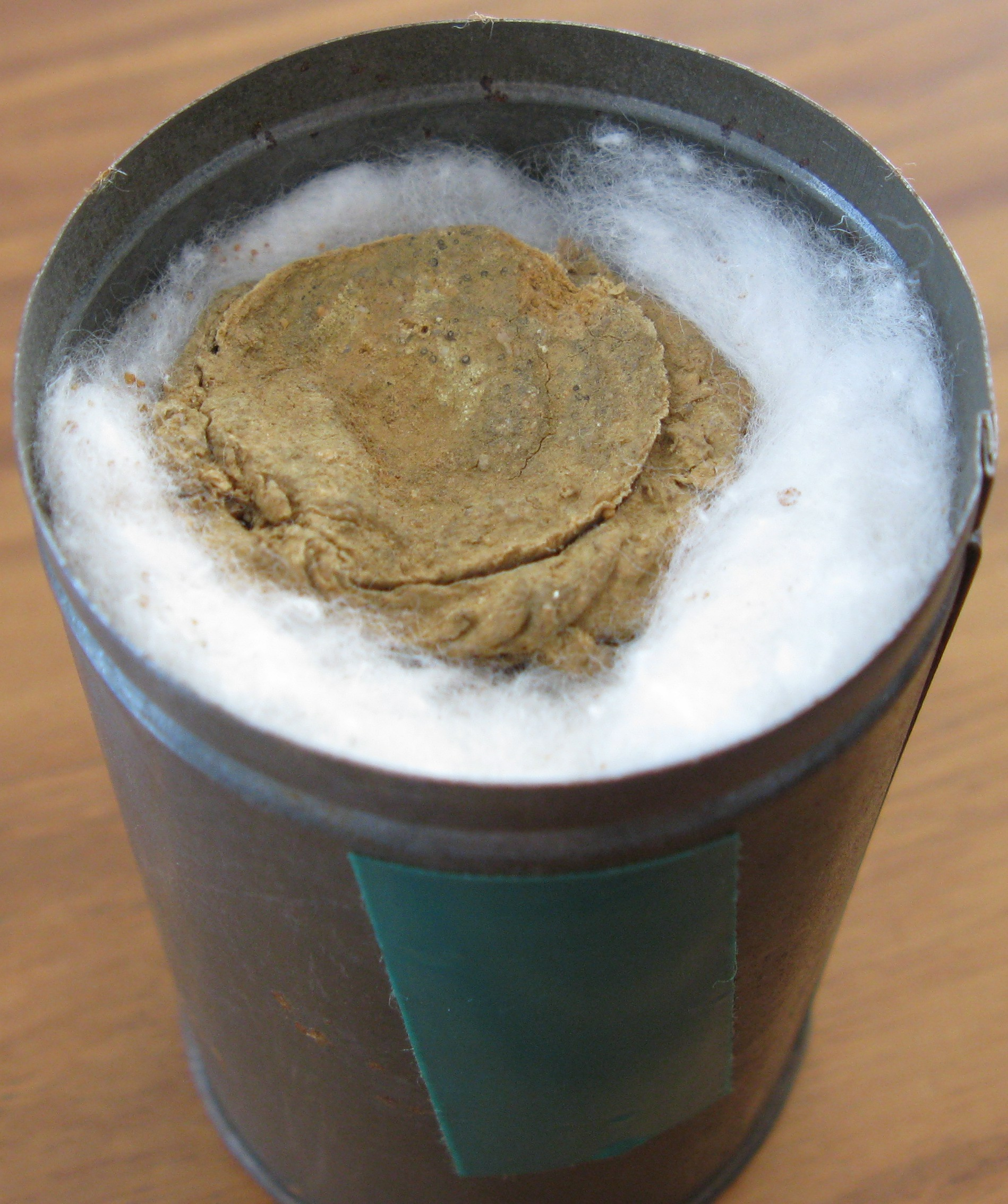
Closed burrow of Cork-lid Trapdoor spider saved in padded container. Probable genus: Stasimopus

Trapdoor: Trapdoor spiders construct burrows with a cork-like trapdoor made of soil, vegetation and silk. The trapdoor is difficult to see when it is closed because the plant and soil materials effectively camouflage it. The trapdoor is hinged on one side with silk. The spiders typically wait for prey while holding on to the underside of the door. Prey is captured when insects, other arthropods, or small vertebrates disturb the 'trip' lines the spider lays out around its trapdoor, alerting the spider to a meal within reach. The spider detects the prey by vibrations and, when it comes close enough, leaps out of its burrow to make the capture. Some Conothele species do not build a burrow, but construct a silken tube with trapdoor in bark crevices.

Basket: The Kaira spider uses a pheromone to attract moths and catches the insects with a basket formed from its legs.

=== Cannibalism ===
Spiders perform cannibalism under a range of circumstances.

Females eating males: Perhaps the most widely known example of cannibalism in spiders is when females cannibalise males before, during or after copulation. For example, the male Australian redback spider (Latrodectus hasselti) is killed by the female after he inserts his second palpus in the female's genital opening; in over 60% of matings, the female then eats the male. However, the theory of the "sacrificial male" may have become greater than the truth. Some believe that this form of cannibalism only occurs in exceptional cases.

Males eating females: Male water spiders (Argyroneta aquatica) show a predilection for mating with larger females, while cannibalizing females smaller than themselves.

Sacrificial mothers: Offspring of the species Stegodyphus lineatus eat their mother. Females of Segestria florentina sometimes die while guarding her eggs and the hatched spiders later eat her.

Non-reproductive cannibalism: Some spiders, such as Pholcus phalangioides, will prey on their own kind when food is scarce.

== Reproduction ==
Death feigning can be used in reproductive behavior of spiders. In the nursery web spider, the male sometimes feigns death to avoid getting eaten by females during mating. Spiders are also well known for their morphological sexual dimorphism.

== Sociality ==
Spiders exhibit varying levels of sociality. Whereas most spiders are solitary and even aggressive toward other members of their own species, some hundreds of species in several families show a tendency to live in groups, often referred to as colonies. These can form relatively long-lasting aggregations. Some of these aggregations can contain as many as 50,000 individuals as in the case of Anelosimus eximius (in the family Theridiidae). The level of sociality often varies between species (interspecies) but can vary within a species (intraspecies) as well. Many of these social spiders show cooperative brood care, use the same nest (web), and have some amount of generational overlap. A few species, such as Anelosimus eximius, exhibit reproductive division of labor. Some biologists argue that this classifies these species as fully eusocial as these non-reproductives can be considered a non-sterile worker caste. This reproductive division of labor is a result of resource availability and monopolization of those resources.

== Locomotion ==
=== Jumping ===
Although all arthropods use muscles attached to the inside of the exoskeleton to flex their limbs, spiders and a few other groups still use hydraulic pressure to extend them. Spiders can generate pressures up to eight times their resting level to extend their legs, and jumping spiders can jump up to 50 times their own length by suddenly increasing the blood pressure in the third or fourth pair of legs. Unlike smaller jumping spiders, though larger spiders use hydraulics to straighten their legs, they depend on their flexor muscles to generate the propulsive force for their jumps.

=== Ballooning ===
Ballooning is a term used for the mechanical kiting spiders use to disperse through the air. A spider or spiderling after hatching will climb as high as it can. The spider then stands on raised legs with its abdomen pointed upwards. After that, it starts releasing several silk threads from its abdomen into the air, which automatically form a triangular shaped parachute. The spider can then let itself be carried away by updrafts of winds, where even the slightest of breeze will suffice.

== Scientific studies ==
Spiders have been used in studies which indicate that invertebrates may experience pain. Under natural conditions, orb-weaving spiders (Argiope spp.) undergo autotomy (self-amputation) if they are stung in a leg by wasps or bees. Under experimental conditions, when spiders were injected in the leg with bee or wasp venom, they shed this appendage. But if they are injected with only saline, they rarely autotomize the leg, indicating it is not the physical insult or the ingress of fluid per se that causes autotomy. Spiders injected with venom components which cause injected humans to report pain (serotonin, histamine, phospholipase A2 and melittin) autotomize the leg, but if the injections contain venom components which do not cause pain to humans, autotomy does not occur.
