= Elles (film) =

2011 film by Małgorzata Szumowska

- French theatrical release poster
- Directed by: Małgośka Szumowska
- Written by: Tine Byrckel; Małgośka Szumowska
- Produced by: Marianne Slot
- Starring: Juliette Binoche; Anaïs Demoustier; Joanna Kulig; Louis-Do de Lencquesaing; Krystyna Janda; Andrzej Chyra
- Cinematography: Michał Englert
- Edited by: Françoise Tourmen; Jacek Drosio
- Music by: Paweł Mykietyn
- Production companies: Slot Machine; Zentropa International Poland; Zentropa International Köln; Canal+ Poland; ZDF; Shot Szumowski; Liberator Productions
- Distributed by: Haut et Court (France); Kino Świat (Poland); Zorro Film (Germany)
- Release dates: 9 September 2011 (TIFF); 1 February 2012 (France); 17 February 2012 (Poland); 29 March 2012 (Germany)
- Running time: 92 minutes
- Countries: France; Poland; Germany
- Languages: French; Polish
- Budget: €3.5 million
- Box office: $3.8 million

Elles (Note: Released in Poland as Sponsoring and in Germany as Das bessere Leben (lit. 'The Better Life')) is a 2011 erotic drama film co-written and directed by Polish director Małgośka Szumowska. It shows an episode in the life of Anne (Juliette Binoche), a journalist in Paris for French Elle who is writing an article about female student prostitution.

Although the young women are not keen on publicity, she persuades two students to talk to her: the provocative Alicja (Joanna Kulig), an ambitious economics student who left Poland to further her education; and the subtle Charlotte (Anaïs Demoustier), enrolled in a Parisian classe préparatoire, determined to leave her modest provincial background behind.

Where Anne is expecting misery and distress, she discovers freedom, pride, and empowerment. As Anne's professional curiosity in the two women becomes a matter of personal interest, she starts to rediscover her own sexuality.

Elles premiered at the 2011 Toronto International Film Festival and was released theatrically in France on 1 February 2012.

== Plot ==
During the course of one day. Anne (Juliette Binoche) is trying to meet the deadline for her article about prostitution, while shopping and preparing dinner for her husband's boss and his wife. She is also worried about her two sons, the eldest of whom has been skipping classes while the younger appears to be starting to be hooked on video games. This narrative is interrupted by the flashbacks to conversations Anne has had with two students, scenes from their lives, and the effect that their work in the sex industry is having on them and those close to them.

Anne interviews Alicja (Joanna Kulig), who, arriving from Poland to study in France, not only lost her suitcase but found the student advisors to be less than helpful in her hour of need. Another student came to her rescue, but admitted that his generosity was partly courtship. By the time we see her being interviewed by Anne, Alicja has earned enough to have a very nice apartment along with designer clothes and handbags. She is much more hedonistic than Charlotte and proceeds to get Anne drunk during the course of the interview in her apartment. When asked who her clients are, Alicja simply replies that they are bored husbands. For Alicja, being alone in a foreign country has led her to seemingly much more freedom than she enjoyed at home, but when asked if she wanted to stop, she admits that there is an element of addiction in the way she earns her money.

Charlotte (Anaïs Demoustier) is quite a different person, who seems very relaxed about the sex she has with her clients. She tried doing part-time work but found that her studies suffered, so she turned to prostitution. But she still does the occasional shift as she needs to be able to explain to her family and boyfriend where her money comes from. These sexual encounters inevitably lead to conflict in her relationship with her boyfriend, who at one point demands to know if she is seeing someone else. Her friendly, girl-next-door nature leads her clients to confide in her about their lives – their jobs, their wives – which has surprised Charlotte as she had imagined the work would have been non-stop sex.

How the students' lives turn out is left to the viewer to judge, with the end of the film focusing more on Anne's life and the effect these encounters with the two students have had on her and her relationship with her husband.

== Cast ==
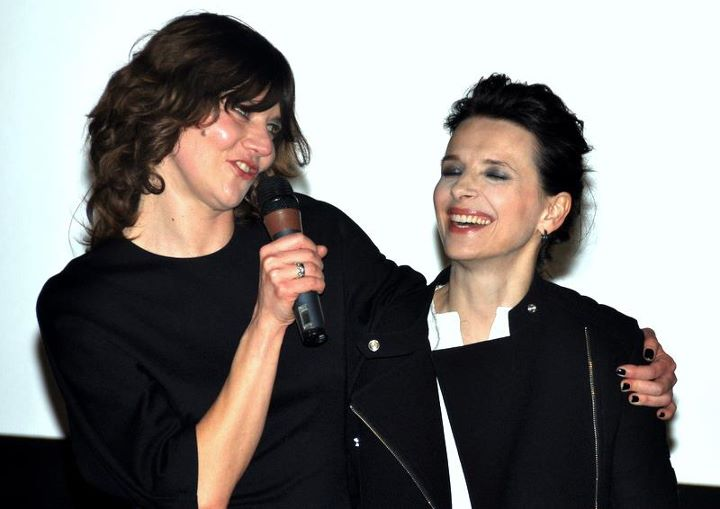
Małgorzata Szumowska and Juliette Binoche at the film premiere

- Juliette Binoche as Anne
- Anaïs Demoustier as Charlotte
- Joanna Kulig as Alicja
- Krystyna Janda as Alicja's mother
- Louis-Do de Lencquesaing as Patrick
- Andrzej Chyra as Sadist client
- Ali Marhyar as Saïd
- Jean-Marie Binoche as Anne's father
- François Civil as Florent (Anne and Patrick's older son)
- Pablo Beugnet as Stéphane (Anne and Patrick's younger son)
- Valérie Dréville as Charlotte's mother
- Jean-Louis Coulloc'h as Charlotte's father
- Arthur Moncia as Thomas
- Scali Delpeyrat as Charles
- Laurence Ragon as Colette
- Alain Libolt as Colette's husband
- Florence Loiret Caille as Rita
- Swann Arlaud as young client
- Nicolas Layani as guitar client

== Production ==
Director Małgośka Szumowska revealed that Joanna Kulig was uncomfortable when filming the scene that depicts a client urinating on her nude body. She added that during the filming of the scene, the actress requested classical music be played in the background, and for not all the crew to be present on the set. Anaïs Demoustier said the scene with the sadistic client was very difficult to film because director wanted to improvise.

== MPAA rating ==
The film was originally rated NC-17 by the Motion Picture Association of America (MPAA) in the United States as a result of explicit sexual content, but this rating was later surrendered, leaving the film unrated.
