= On the Silver Globe (film) =

1988 film by Andrzej Żuławski

- Theatrical release poster by Andrzej Pągowski
- Directed by: Andrzej Żuławski
- Screenplay by: Andrzej Żuławski
- Based on: The Lunar Trilogy by Jerzy Żuławski
- Starring: Andrzej Seweryn; Jerzy Trela; Grażyna Dyląg; Waldemar Kownacki; Krystyna Janda; Iwona Bielska
- Cinematography: Andrzej J. Jaroszewicz
- Edited by: Krzysztof Osiecki
- Music by: Andrzej Korzyński
- Production companies: Pryzmat (1976–1978); KADR (1986–1987)
- Distributed by: Film Polski Ltd.
- Release dates: 12 May 1988 (Cannes); 10 February 1989
- Running time: 165 minutes
- Country: Poland
- Language: Polish
- Budget: >89.7 million zł

On the Silver Globe (Polish: Na srebrnym globie) is a 1988 Polish epic science fiction film written, directed, and narrated by Andrzej Żuławski. It is an adaptation of the pioneering science-fiction novel series The Lunar Trilogy (1903–1911) by his grand-uncle, Jerzy Żuławski. The story follows a team of astronauts who crash-land on an Earth-like planet and found a society; generations later, a visitor from Earth arrives and is hailed as a messiah, after which chaos ensues. The film stars Andrzej Seweryn, Jerzy Trela, Grażyna Dyląg, Waldemar Kownacki, Krystyna Janda, and Iwona Bielska. Because the actors were unavailable during post-production, Michał Bajor dubbed Seweryn and Maria Pakulnis dubbed Dyląg.

After the success of That Most Important Thing: Love (1975), Żuławski returned from exile in France at the invitation of Polish authorities and received conditional approval to adapt The Lunar Trilogy. Principal photography began on 15 June 1976, and continued until 1 June 1977, when Deputy Minister of Culture and Art Janusz Wilhelmi ordered the immediate termination of the production. However, the studio and crew managed to preserve the negatives, props, and wardrobe. The film was 70–80% complete; by the end of 1977, its budget had reached 89.7 million zł, making it one of the most expensive Polish films at the time. Its production company, Pryzmat, was dissolved in February 1978. KADR took over in the mid-1980s and allowed Żuławski to assemble a release version. Rather than reshoot the missing scenes, he added voice-over narration over new footage of contemporary Warsaw and Kraków to describe the gaps.

On the Silver Globe premiered at the 41st Cannes Film Festival on 12 May 1988, and was released in a limited theatrical run in Poland on 10 February 1989. The film received critical acclaim at Cannes and lukewarm reviews from Polish critics at the time. It went on to win the Award of the Museum of Cinematography in Łódź at the 1988 Polish Film Festival, and a Best Film nomination at the 1989 Fantasporto festival.

Over time, the film has accrued a modest cult following. Long circulated in specialized screenings, it gained a wider audience after a 2010s digital restoration that recovered the intended color palette. Critics have consistently praised its visual invention and philosophical density; it is frequently cited as Żuławski's most ambitious work or opus magnum, and sometimes as the greatest science-fiction film never fully made. A documentary about its production, Escape to the Silver Globe, premiered in 2021.

== Plot ==
In the distant future, a rider delivers a decades-old transmission module that has fallen from the sky to two men living on Earth alongside a primitive population. It contains the video diary of five dissident astronauts—O'Tamor, Tomasz, Marta, Piotr, and Jerzy—who fled their society and crashed in the mountains of an Earth-like planet, killing O'Tamor. Unable to breathe at high altitude because of hypoxia, the survivors descend toward the coast, passing enormous ruins of an earlier civilization. The injured Tomasz dies in a flood while Marta is pregnant with his child.

Marta gives birth to Tomasz II, whose rapid growth reveals that children born on the planet mature far faster than the original astronauts. Marta, Piotr, and Jerzy establish a settlement and raise further generations; Jerzy becomes its chronicler. Piotr disappears and is found dead. Marta has a final child with Jerzy, their daughter Ada, and dies in childbirth. Subsequent generations reproduce through incest and mature quickly while Jerzy ages normally. The founders become mythology: Marta a creator and mother figure, Piotr a civilizing hero, and Jerzy the semidivine "Old Man". Ada helps establish a cult around the still-living Jerzy, whose memories of Earth are treated as revelation.

A later descendant, Tomasz III, crosses the sea and discovers the Sherns, winged, one-eyed indigenous humanoids with a more advanced civilization. The Sherns dominate the humans and produce powerful hybrid offspring called Morques. Numerous religious sects arise, along with a prophecy that a messianic "Victor" will descend from the mountains and liberate humanity. The elderly Jerzy returns to the crash site, places his recordings in a transmission module, and launches it into space before dying.

Years later, Earth astronaut Marek—who has viewed Jerzy's video diary—arrives in a modern spacecraft, finds Jerzy's remains, and descends from the mountains. The Expectant Brethren hail him as the prophesied Victor. Though he insists he is ordinary, his arrival sparks an uprising against the Sherns. After early victories, he accepts theocratic leadership. High priest Malahuda transfers authority to him and presents his daughter Ihezal as the Victor's consecrated companion. Marek and Ihezal become lovers, though he repeatedly calls her "Aza", the woman he left on Earth, who becomes involved with his colleague Jacek.

As Victor, Marek enforces belief in him, Earth, and the Old Man, and requisitions resources for war. He challenges customs by preventing the ritual killing of captured Morques, arguing that their human ancestry may allow them to join humanity. The scholar Roda rejects the colony's religion and the existence of Earth, suggesting Marek was expelled rather than divinely sent; Roda and the eccentric performer known as the Actor are eventually exiled.

Human forces capture Awij, a prominent Shern whose forehead eye communicates via light pulses that psychologically affect humans. Marek becomes obsessed with him; their talks challenge his view of the Sherns as pure evil, while Awij grows attached to Ihezal. After freeing much human territory, Marek invades the Shern homeland, secretly telling Roda and the Actor how to reach his spacecraft if he fails. In the Shern city, he discovers their luminous "lamps" (brains) used for communication and signs they worship higher beings. The campaign collapses from combat and disease; Marek returns with only a fraction of his army.

The defeat undermines his status, and priests increasingly suspect he is an outcast rather than a divine emissary. He proposes abolishing the laws and priesthood, redistributing property and ending religious promises. While walking among the people, he is stoned by the crowd and stabbed by Ihezal before being crucified. As he dies, Awij addresses him as a brother; Jacek then appears and shoots Awij, who dies invoking love.

Roda and the Actor reach Marek's spacecraft, contact the advanced civilization, and are sent to Old Earth. Meanwhile, Ihezal appears in Jacek's society wearing Aza's clothes. Jacek suffers a fatal heart attack, has an out-of-body experience watching failed resuscitation attempts, then walks away toward a woman resembling Ihezal among primitive people as a riderless horse crosses the dawn landscape.

== Cast ==
- Andrzej Seweryn as Marek (voiced by Michał Bajor)
- Jerzy Trela as Jerzy, the "Old Man"
- Grażyna Dyląg as Ihezal (voiced by Maria Pakulnis)
- Waldemar Kownacki as Jacek
- Iwona Bielska as Marta
- Jerzy Grałek as Piotr
- Elżbieta Karkoszka as Ada, daughter of Marta and Jerzy
- Krystyna Janda as Aza
- Maciej Góraj as Jeret, a warrior
- Henryk Talar as Marek's guide
- Leszek Długosz as Tomasz (voiced by Krzysztof Kolberger)
- Jan Frycz (credited as Andrzej Frycz) as Tomasz II, son of Marta and Tomasz
- Henryk Bista as High Priest Malahuda
- Wiesław Komasa as the Actor
- Jerzy Goliński as an astronaut
- Tadeusz Zięba as an astronaut (voiced by Andrzej Precigs)
- Erwin Nowiaszek as Actor II
- Roman Frankl as Tomasz III
- Janusz Zerbst as Jacek's assistant
- Andrzej Lubicz-Piotrowski as Awij, a Shern (uncredited)
- Jerzy Rogowski as a soldier (uncredited)
- Krzysztof Stachowski as Roda (uncredited)
- Adam Ferency as a priest (voice; uncredited)
- Andrzej Żuławski as himself (window reflection at the end; uncredited)

== Production ==
=== Development ===
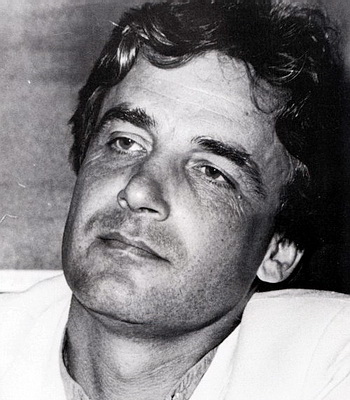
Writer and director Andrzej Żuławski (pictured, c. late 1980s) adapted the film from his grand-uncle's pioneering science fiction novel series The Lunar Trilogy.

Filmmaker Andrzej Żuławski had long wanted to adapt The Lunar Trilogy by his grand-uncle Jerzy Żuławski (published 1903–1911), especially the first volume originally titled On the Silver Globe: A Manuscript from the Moon (Polish: Na srebrnym globie. Rękopis z Księżyca). The novels haunted Andrzej's youth; he later described them as among the most sinister, sad, and pessimistic works about humanity ever written—"terrible, but terrible good" in the florid style of the early 1900s. Their dark vision and elevated language shaped his imagination and provided both the source material and a thematic foundation for his eventual film. A major difference is that the novels are set on an Earth-like moon, whereas the film is implied to place the story on a distant Earth analog in another star system.

After leaving Poland for France in 1972 to avoid further censorship—following the completion of The Devil in 1972, which was banned and not released until 1988—Andrzej Żuławski achieved critical success with the French production That Most Important Thing: Love (1975). Polish authorities, seeking to expand international interest in Polish cinema and encouraging prominent directors successful with audiences overseas (including Żuławski and Jerzy Skolimowski) to make Polish-produced projects, contacted Żuławski through the Embassy of Poland. They told him that the earlier difficulties with The Devil had been a misunderstanding and invited him to return to Poland to undertake a project of his choosing, with the stipulation that he "shoot a film that would make everyone happy."

During this period, Żuławski's marriage to actress Małgorzata Braunek ended, and he returned to Poland with their son, Xawery Żuławski, assuming primary responsibility for his care. Żuławski later associated the sadness and despair he felt at the time with his response to reading his great-uncle Jerzy Żuławski's The Lunar Trilogy, and he obtained conditional approval to adapt the novels. Between 1975 and 1977, he wrote the screenplay as a free adaptation of the novels, initially planned as a two-part film covering the first two volumes—On the Silver Globe and The Conqueror (Polish: Zwycięzca)—with selected elements from the third. The project was developed under the state production unit Zespół Filmowy "Pryzmat".

Żuławski said On the Silver Globe is fundamentally a film about freedom: how to remain free, express ideas outside the accepted vocabulary of the time, and act independently in a system that discourages such behaviour. He equated this with freedom of thinking, including the human impulse to contemplate God. While the source novels critique organized religion, they also ask why people think about God at all—a question he linked directly to intellectual and personal freedom. Such a conversation, he noted, is often easier under conditions of oppression.

These themes placed the film in opposition to the communist system. Authorities initially approved the project, assuming the novels were a simple attack on the Church and organized religion; this misunderstanding allowed filming to begin. According to Żuławski, after roughly a year, officials recognized the broader implications and that was the actual reason behind the abruptly halted production.

=== Pre-production ===
The film was announced in March 1976, proclaimed as the only major Polish epic film in production that year. Żuławski had planned it as a relatively low-cost production that would rely on minimal built sets and extensive use of existing locations rather than elaborate studio construction. At the turn of 1975–1976 Zespół Filmowy Pryzmat submitted the project to the Film Production Enterprise with a proposed budget of approximately 60 million złoty; in early March 1976 the head of cinematography, Mieczysław Wojtczak, approved it for production, and on 8 March 1976 a production contract was signed for 57.4 million 1976 złoty—a substantial figure for Polish cinema of the period but not exceptional when compared with contemporary superproductions such as The Deluge (1974). The contract stipulated that principal photography should be completed by the end of 1976.

Cinematographer Andrzej J. Jaroszewicz was hired, along with production designers Tadeusz Kosarewicz and Jerzy Śnieżawski and costume designers Magdalena Tesławska and Krzysztof Tyszkiewicz; the team prepared for chronic shortages of materials that were typical of the state-run economy. Karol Chodura served as the first assistant director.

In May 1976, the film's cast was announced, some of whom were different from those in the final film. Andrzej Lubicz-Piotrowski was initially set to play O'Tamor (he instead appears uncredited as Awij); Grażyna Krukówna was set to play Ada; Ewa Górzańska was set to make her screen debut as Ihezal, with Antoni Pszoniak as her father, the priest Malahuda; and Michał Grudziński and Jerzy Gruza as priests Elem and Sewim, respectively.

Żuławski's mentor, Andrzej Wajda, advised against the project, regarding its scale as too ambitious for the Polish film industry given the country's economic difficulties. The intended visual style of the film was described as a form of high-tech futurism suited to the constraints of the era. Despite these concerns, Żuławski remained fully committed and was present on set throughout production, examining even the smallest details. An assistant costume designer later recalled that he became obsessed with the film and something of a perfectionist. Members of the cast and crew described the experience of working on the production as a form of escapism from the hardships of life in communist Poland.

=== Filming ===
Actress Iwona Bielska (left) and director Andrzej Żuławski (right) during the film's location shoot in July 1976.

Principal photography began at dawn on 15 June 1976 on the sand dunes near Łeba, and it was initially planned as a two-part film with a scheduled wrap in December 1976. On the night of 20–21 June 1976, filming took place near Jastrzębia Góra on the Polish Baltic coast. Until 29 September, scenes for the film were filmed on the Baltic coast and in the Gobi Desert in Mongolia (facilitated because Mongolia owed Poland a debt for imported Polish films). On 29 September 1976, shooting was temporarily suspended on charges of "exceptionally low work efficiency and cost overruns"; Żuławski undertook to accelerate the schedule.

According to star Andrzej Seweryn, Żuławski continued to revise the screenplay during filming, frequently providing new lines on set that Seweryn believed included quotations from Żuławski's own diary. Seweryn has stated that the character he played, as well as many elements of the film, reflected traits of Żuławski's personality and details from his personal life. For the crucifixion scene, Seweryn's dialogue differed from the scripted version; he delivered the line "what? why" rather than the script's "I loved her so much. It hurts". During filming of the scene, Seweryn's eyelids were glued shut with superglue. A real human hand, obtained from a morgue in Elbląg and previously used by a medical academy, served as a prop for the character's hand when it was nailed to the cross. Jaroszewicz later said that nothing dishonourable had occurred, noting that a priest was present during the filming and that the hand had already been used for medical purposes.

A panel of experts appointed by the Central Board of Cinematography subsequently gave a positive assessment of the material already shot, granting an extension until May 1977 together with additional funds, raising the financial limit to 71 million złoty. Filming then continued in Police, in Lower Silesia, in the Wieliczka salt mine, in the Jewish quarter of Kazimierz, Krakow, again on the coast and in the mountains of the Caucasus. In April 1977, the most complex set pieces—models of spacecraft—were transported from the Wrocław film studio to locations in the Caucasus Mountains of Georgia.

Jaroszewicz shot the film primarily with a 48 mm lens and a wide-angle 9.8 mm lens; only the later portions of the shoot employed a broader range of technical resources such as crane shots, dollies, and zooms. The crew faced persistent logistical shortages of costumes and set materials, while the demanding pace and the director's intense working methods placed heavy strain on the unit.

According to Żuławski, the film does not feature a single shot with an optical special effect unlike its contemporaries in science fiction film.

==== Termination ====
The production of On the Silver Globe has been halted by the Deputy Minister of Culture, Janusz Wilhelmi. The Head of the State Film Companies sent us this message at 5 p.m.

[The final parameters stated in this report]: working days in total 473, days off 106, calendar days in total 579. Camera negative used for screen tests: 5,155 metres. For the shoot, 21,694 metres. Film stock meters in total: 3,626, which accounts for 72.5% of the film. Number of stills: 2,150.

— Translation of Production Report No. 248, dated 1 June 1977

In May 1977, Mieczysław Wojtczak, who had supported On the Silver Globe's production, was dismissed amid political fallout over his approval of Man of Marble for release. He lost his position as head of what later became the Cinematography Committee and First Deputy Minister of the Ministry of Culture and Art—the official responsible for overseeing Polish film productions—and was replaced by Janusz Wilhelmi.

On 1 June 1977, while the crew was on location at Karwia on the Baltic, Wilhelmi viewed the dailies and thereupon ordered an immediate halt to production, without consulting the director. The directive first reached the set as a telephonegram from the acting director of the Film Production Enterprise, followed by an official letter demanding the cessation of all work, the liquidation of outstanding obligations, the archiving of assets, and the submission of a complete organisational and economic report by 30 September 1977. Production manager Jan Włodarczyk relayed the news to the company, cast, and crew. Aggravated and distraught, Żuławski left at once for Warsaw and shortly afterwards departed Poland for France. A week after the shutdown, the crew wrote to Wilhelmi asking that production be allowed to resume, but he remained unmoved.

An official press statement cited drastic financial and schedule overruns: costs had already reached at least 58 million zł, and were projected to climb to 110 million zł if completed as planned. Finished sets and vehicles remained waiting in Georgia and Wrocław. Contrary to later legends that sets and costumes were ordered burned, the principal first-unit costumes were packed and stored at the Wrocław film studio; after restoration, they were exhibited on several occasions, including the Gdynia Film Festival of 2016. Straw-and-bark huts were dismantled because they could not be maintained; a deeply embedded beach "Stonehenge" replica (nicknamed "Igloo") was eventually excavated by local villagers; the two adapted fishing cutters used as ships were parked in Władysławowo; and the unused spacecraft models returned from Georgia a month later. Mass-costume tunics worn by unemployed port workers were buried as refuse; some stored items later suffered insect damage and further losses during the 1997 Wrocław flood. Full production documentation was deposited in the Film Production Enterprise archive.

By its June 1977 termination, approximately 70–80 percent of the planned material (about 72.5 percent of the allocated film stock) had been shot after 473 working days and the use of roughly 21,694 metres of camera negative for principal photography. By the end of 1977, cumulative expenditure stood at 89.7 million złoty, making the project—once post-production costs were later added—one of the, if not the, most expensive title(s) in the history of Polish cinema to that date. By comparison, far exceeding the average 5.5–10 million złoty budget of a standard Polish feature of the period.

A subsequent Supreme Audit Office (NIK) report from 1979 judged Wilhelmi's decision itself to have been uneconomic. Contemporary and later accounts attributed the interruption variously to a political struggle between Wilhelmi and Culture Minister Józef Tejchma, a desire to demonstrate a hard line toward the film community after the impact of Andrzej Wajda's Man of Marble (1977), residual hostility toward the "Pryzmat" unit headed by Aleksander Ścibor-Rylski, and ideological objections to a narrative that affirmed freedom and religion rather than the expected anti-clerical stance. Though filming had been terminated, the production technically continued until "Pryzmat" itself was dissolved in February 1978. On 16 March 1978, Wilhelmi died in a plane crash. (Note: The Eureka Entertainment Blu-ray release features the documentary Escape to the Silver Globe (2021) by Kuba Mikurda about the production of the film, which includes interviews with several people who worked on it and with Żuławski and his son Xawery. The documentary claims that the Ministry of Culture had been alarmed by Andrzej Wajda's Man of Marble (1977) and decided to clamp down on the Polish film industry, and Janusz Wilhelmi was appointed vice-minister of cultural affairs. Wilhelmi had no interest in cinema and wanted to turn the Polish film industry into a department of Polish Television. He wanted to show he was in charge of the film industry and had the power to humiliate Żuławski, and decided to make a show by ordering all work on On the Silver Globe to cease immediately, and expelling Żuławski from the country. Żuławski says he went to Dakar to visit his father, where he met a man who gave him a shaman's jacket from a remote part of Mali to protect him and his family. Żuławski only put on the jacket once, and the following day Wilhelmi was killed in a plane crash. Also, on the same day, members of the film crew had watched the first screening of a very rough cut of the film.)

=== Post-production ===
After "Pryzmat" was dissolved, the project briefly passed to Andrzej Wajda's Zespół Filmowy "X" unit. A Ministry letter of 12 March 1980 authorised continuation with a budget of 9.5 million złoty—far less than the 52 million earlier estimated as necessary to finish the original plan—indicating that only a stop-gap solution was contemplated. A 1983 article reported a decision in autumn 1980 with a budget of 10–15 million złoty and noted that Żuławski had already proposed substituting a commentary and "reprojection" for the unfilmable missing scenes. In 1981, writer Feliks Netz claimed Żuławski did not take up these offers at the time, citing among other reasons the unresolved fate of his earlier banned film The Devil and the still-fresh wounds of the interrupted production.

Meanwhile, Żuławski left France for New York, devastated and without family support; he then wrote and shot the horror film Possession (1981). According to Żuławski, around 1980 he was allowed to travel to Wrocław and assemble the surviving footage; approximately 40,000 metres of film had been kept under lock and key. He recalled that in a week of hasty work with an editor he produced a provisional three-hour cut marking the missing sequences, scored with reverse-played music by composer Andrzej Korzyński from Korzyński's previous film effort as composer. This rough cut was occasionally screened informally in film clubs during this time.

In December 1985, Żuławski left France and returned to Poland to celebrate Christmas with his family. He soon learned that his presence in the country might allow On the Silver Globe to be completed, thanks to the intercession of Jerzy Kawalerowicz. The project had recently been transferred to Kawalerowicz's Film Unit "KADR", which offered him the opportunity to finish the film; Żuławski accepted. Post-production, script revisions, and additional photography began in early 1986.

Several complications arose immediately, particularly with the cast. Some actors had other commitments or had visibly aged (Żuławski noted that certain men were now balding), others were caring for young children, some had died, and several were living abroad. As a result, no new footage of the original cast was filmed. Many dubbed their own dialogue while those unavailable were replaced by others—including Michał Bajor for Seweryn, Maria Pakulnis for Dyląg, Krzysztof Kolberger for Długosz, and Andrzej Precigs for Zięba. Further difficulties included an elusive crew, the loss of sets and costumes, and the intervening changes in science-fiction cinema.

In 1986 and 1987, seeking an experimental solution, Żuławski instead filmed bridging sequences on the streets of contemporary Warsaw and Kraków and supplied his own voice-over narration to explain the gaps. Locations included Kraków's St. Mary's Church, the Kazimierz cemetery (also previously used in the original shoot), Grodzka Street, Kraków, a pastry shop in Łeba, wild willows, seaside dunes, and Baltic beaches. Some of these may not have formed part of the voiced-over scenes (the exact extent is unclear). These were shot by Jaroszewicz, Jerzy Zieliński, Jarosław Żamojda, and others.

After filming concluded in 1987, the sound design was completed. Korzyński composed the score, and Krzysztof Osiecki edited the film. Production manager Tadeusz Lampka oversaw completion for Kadr. (Note: Lampka was credited as production manager (1986–87) alongside Jan Włodarczyk and Richard Barski (1976–78). No producer role was credited on the film itself; Lampka later received sole producer credit in screening lists for several overseas festivals.)

Żuławski later described returning to the film after a decade as "like a moving reunion with a wronged child". He believed that if it was released in 1977 it would have become a massive hit in Poland, and found a large audience hungry for work that challenged the prevailing order, even if viewers did not fully grasp its meaning.

== Visual style ==
The visual style of On the Silver Globe is feverish, hallucinatory, and aggressively kinetic, marked by relentless camera movement, extreme wide-angle distortion, and a cold, desaturated color palette that renders its landscapes and figures otherworldly. Cinematographer Jaroszewicz, working closely with Żuławski, employed an extremely subjective camera technique and wide-angle lenses that distort the image; the first part of the film uses handheld, subjective shots resembling modern micro-cameras, while later sequences are filmed more violently and dynamically. The opening hour adopts a found footage aesthetic through the astronauts' video diaries, with nervous jump cuts and handheld movement that mimic the characters' growing panic, while a cyan-blue tint makes "the new world seem suitably alien", according to John Coulthart. Subsequent sections abandon this for long, unbroken takes in which the camera races, wheels, and plunges through crowds and terrain with the same delirium as the performers, creating what critic Richard Brody called "a wildly gyrating camera that scampers across fields, vaults over hilltops, thrusts through phalanxes of warriors, and pivots to reveal soldiers dancing on the beach in front of orange flames." Brody ranked the film among "the most visually extravagant" ever made.

Jaroszewicz created the signature dirty-blue or near-monochromatic look by filtering Kodak stock (whose vivid colors Żuławski rejected as too "American") to wash out warmth and introduce a grimy, metaphysical chill; a later digital restoration recovered the intended cold tones and textures.

Production designers Tadeusz Kosarewicz and Jerzy Śnieżawski, and costume designers Magdalena Tesławska and Krzysztof Tyszkiewicz, practiced resourceful bricolage under chronic shortages of the state economy: pilot suits adapted into astronaut gear, rubbish transformed into tribal armor, headdresses of fur and feather, flowing robes and hessian-like fabrics, prosthetic scars, peeling paint, and rubber textures. The result is a tactile, primitivist pageant—eclectic borrowings from African, Japanese, Native American, and shamanic sources. Coulthart likened this production design to Federico Fellini's Satyricon or Métal Hurlant comics, and felt that lends the evolving lunar civilization a makeshift grandeur.

The style externalizes the film's themes of myth-making, power, and the repetition of human folly. Actors convulse, shout, and wallow in blood, mud, and dirt in a manner reminiscent of Antonin Artaud's Theatre of Cruelty, while the camera's aggression mirrors their spasmodic monologues on transcendence and idolatry.

== Release and reception ==
Immediately after production was terminated in 1977, a French producer sought to buy the rights, believing that Żuławski's popularity in France and the coming era of space cinema would ensure its success. Unable to secure sufficient European financing, he approached American studio and distributor Orion Pictures, which showed interest; an Orion representative attempted to purchase the rights and materials, but the Polish Ministry of Culture and Art delayed and ultimately refused the sale, fearing embarrassment if the film were completed.

In autumn 1979 the director of the Cannes Film Festival requested permission to screen the unfinished film in competition (possibly for the 1980 Cannes Film Festival); Polish authorities denied access. Korzyński later claimed that an unfinished copy without recorded dialogue was nevertheless smuggled out of Poland in a small van by a member of the film's production-management staff and shown secretly at Cannes. According to Korzyński, Żuławski provided live dialogue and scene explanations during the screening, which made a strong impression on those present. However, Korzyński did not specify the year this happened.

On the Silver Globe finally passed its official acceptance screening (kolaudacja) by Polish authorities on 10 July 1987. Film Polski Ltd. handled the film's initial distribution in Poland and abroad. Under the simplified title The Silver Globe (French: Le globe d'argent), the film officially had its world premiere on 12 May 1988 at the 41st Cannes Film Festival, where it opened the Un Certain Regard section and received a standing ovation. The finished film runs 157 minutes according to several Polish sources. International listings and home-video releases give a run-time of 157, 165, or 166 minutes.

The film was shown at the Polish Film Festival in Gdynia in October 1988 and received a limited theatrical release in Poland on 10 February 1989. Early festival and television screenings also included Fantasporto in Portugal (February 1989) and a television broadcast in Mexico on the same day as the Polish theatrical opening. KADR later acquired the rights and are listed for distribution on subsequent releases and festival showings.

The film received its first home-video release in 2006 in Poland, as part of the "Platinum Collection of Polish Cinema" DVD series issued by MediaWay and distributed by GM Distribution. Subsequent DVD editions appeared abroad, including a United States release by Polart in August 2007 and a French release by Malavida Films. According to Film.org.pl in 2017, the Polish, American and German (broadcast on 3sat in 1990) versions differ in image quality and color grading; the Polish transfer is generally regarded as the most faithful to the original, while the American edition shows reduced quality and the German version features a distinct colour correction. The film was released on Blu-ray on 26 February 2024 in the Eureka Entertainment Masters of Cinema series. Two discs contain the 1988 film plus several extras and documentaries.

The film had its UK premiere in 2009 at Tate, with a Q&A with Żuławski afterward.

=== Critical response ===
On the Silver Globe received a mixed response upon its initial release in Poland and has since attracted substantial critical acclaim, particularly following restorations and wider rediscovery. The film was met with critical acclaim at Cannes; The Boston Globe called it "powerful and striking". Metacritic assigned the film a weighted average score of 72 out of 100, based on four critics, indicating "generally favourable reviews".

Contemporary Polish reception was originally lukewarm. Aleksander Ledóchowski, writing for Film magazine, praised the acting and Żuławski's ambitious vision, describing the reconstruction as a scarred hybrid that defies normal evaluation. He highlighted its raw imagination, poetic dialogue, expressive performances and camerawork, and artistic sets, concluding that the incomplete film was both captivating and frustrating—leaving viewers uncertain whether it was a masterpiece or a failure—and viewed its story as an important part of Polish film history. In the same magazine's "Dziewięciu gniewnych ludzi" ("Nine Angry Men") rating column (six stars highest, one lowest), the eight critics who reviewed it gave scores ranging from four indicating "good" (Ledóchowski) to the lowest score of one indicating "bad" (Tadeusz Sobolewski), with others awarding two indicating "weak" (Maciej Pawlicki and Tadeusz Szyma) or three indicating "debatable" (Jan Olszewski, Jerzy Peltz, Jerzy Plazewski, and Janusz Skwara) stars. Years later, however, Sobolewski reassessed it as among Żuławski's "boldest and most original" achievements. He described it, and Żuławski's The Third Part of the Night and The Devil as works that "revealed entirely new possibilities for cinematic storytelling, unlike anything else in our cinema—hallucinatory, violent, subjective, and created in a trance-like state, much like the later films of David Lynch."

On the Silver Globe is widely regarded as a classic film maudit (lit. cursed film)—a work dealing with socio-political transgression that was suppressed and neglected in its day, only later rediscovered and reassessed as a major achievement.

Upon viewing the film years after its release, filmmaker Martin Scorsese became an admirer of it, struck by its madly propelled camera work and visual scale, he reportedly gasped and asked Żuławski about the size of its budget. He also told Żuławski that Hollywood could never make such a film, asserting it would likely have required a billion-dollar budget if produced there.

Mark Reeder first saw it by chance in 1995 and later restored and compiled Korzyński's soundtrack for Mondo Vision 4K/Blu-ray releases.

Singer-musician Jane Weaver drew from the film's title and post-apocalyptic/cosmic imagery with her 2014 album The Silver Globe.

=== Accolades ===
Notably, the film received the Award of the Museum of Cinematography in Łódź (also known as the "Artur" Award), presented at the 13th Polish Film Festival in Gdynia in 1988 as a special, out-of-competition recognition. On the occasion of what was marked as the 80th anniversary of Polish feature cinema, it was honored with the award as a "pioneering picture in the search for new means of expression, creatively enriching the language of film art." Żuławski received the award and kept it at his parents' house in Warsaw; he later called it his most prized possession.

Date	Award	Category	Recipients	Result	Ref.
1988	Cannes Film Festival	Un Certain Regard	Andrzej Żuławski	Nominated	
1988	Polish Film Festival	Award of the Museum of Cinematography in Łódź	Andrzej Żuławski	Won	
1989	Fantasporto	Best Film	Andrzej Żuławski	Nominated	

=== Documentary ===
In 2021, Polish film scholar and director Kuba Mikurda released the documentary Escape to the Silver Globe (Ucieczka na srebrny glob), which examines the production history of On the Silver Globe, its interruption by Polish authorities, and its eventual incomplete completion in the late 1980s.

The film combines archival footage from the original production, photographs, clips from Żuławski's other works, and new interviews with surviving cast and crew members, including Andrzej Seweryn, cinematographer Jaroszewicz, and Żuławski's son Xawery, as well as figures such as Krzysztof Zanussi. It also incorporates personal context, addressing the breakdown of Żuławski's marriage to Braunek around the time of production and his intense involvement in the project. Mikurda has described the documentary as exploring both the film's political and logistical challenges under the communist authorities—particularly the role of Wilhelmi—and the personal dimensions of Żuławski's work.

Escape to the Silver Globe premiered at the Millennium Docs Against Gravity festival in 2021; it received multiple awards there and elsewhere, and was subsequently released theatrically in Poland.
