= Andrzej J. Jaroszewicz =

Polish cinematographer (born 1938)

- Jaroszewicz in 2023
- Born: Andrzej Jarosław Jaroszewicz; 12 May 1938 (age 88); Biała Podlaska, Poland
- Occupations: Cinematographer; director; educator
- Years active: 1961–present
- Children: 2

Andrzej Jarosław Jaroszewicz (born 12 May 1938) is a Polish cinematographer and documentary director who has worked on more than 50 films. He is best known for his long collaboration with director Andrzej Żuławski, notably serving as director of photography on his films On the Silver Globe (1988), Boris Godunov (1989), and Szamanka (1996). He also contributed as camera operator on Żuławski's The Devil (1972) and Possession (1981).

== Biography ==
Andrzej Jarosław Jaroszewicz was born on 12 May 1938 in Biała Podlaska, Poland, to a family of teachers. His grandmother wanted him to become a bishop, his mother wanted him to become a doctor, and his father hoped he would finish technical university studies. Despite these expectations, he pursued photography and film.

As a teenager he had no initial ambitions to work in cinema, but he took photographs and read books about photography. He first attempted to enter the Cinematography Department of the Łódź Film School in 1955 and studied there in 1955–1956. He left after the first year. Between 1956 and 1959 he studied drawing at a teacher-training college (Studium nauczycielskie). From 1961 to 1963 he worked as an assistant director on several Polish feature films. He was readmitted to the Łódź Film School in 1963, entering directly into the second year of the Cinematography Department. He completed his studies and graduated in 1966.

Jaroszewicz became a long-time collaborator of Andrzej Żuławski. He first worked with Żuławski on The Devil (1972), followed by On the Silver Globe (filmed mainly 1976–1977 and completed/released 1987–1988), Boris Godunov (1989), The Blue Note (1991), and Szamanka (1996). He worked as camera operator on Żuławski's Possession (1981).

Outside the Żuławski collaboration he worked with other major Polish directors. Among these were Dekalog: Eight (1988) for Krzysztof Kieślowski and Quo Vadis (2001) for Jerzy Kawalerowicz. In later years he continued feature and television work, including cinematography on the crime series Fala zbrodni (multiple seasons and episodes, 2003–2008) and aerial photography for the series Father Matthew (2008–present). In 2019, he shot Bird Talk, a film directed by Andrzej's son Xawery Żuławski, and was based on Andrzej's final screenplay.

Jaroszewicz co-directed the documentary series Babilon.pl (TV 2004). He has also worked on other documentaries (including Powrót, 2025) and continued technical and consultative roles.

He is a member of the Polish Society of Cinematographers (PSC) and served as its president until 2011. He is also a member of the Polish Film Academy.

In 2002, together with Andrzej Żuławski, he received the Special Award for a Polish Duo (Director–Cinematographer) at the 10th Camerimage International Film Festival of the Art of Cinematography in Łódź (the award is sometimes referred to in Polish sources as a "Złota Żaba" for the duo). In 2005 he was awarded the Gold Cross of Merit (Złoty Krzyż Zasługi). In 2016 he received the Bronze Medal "Zasłużony Kulturze Gloria Artis".
