= Szamanka =

- French theatrical release poster
- Directed by: Andrzej Żuławski
- Written by: Manuela Gretkowska
- Produced by: Jacky Ouaknine
- Starring: Iwona Petry; Bogusław Linda
- Cinematography: Andrzej J. Jaroszewicz
- Edited by: Wanda Zeman
- Music by: Andrzej Korzyński
- Production companies: Compagnie des Films; Canal+ Polska; Film+; Visa Film International; Alhena Films
- Distributed by: Syrena Entertainment Group (Poland); Compagnie des Films (France)
- Release dates: 10 May 1996 (Poland); 19 March 1997 (France)
- Running time: 112 minutes
- Countries: France; Poland; Switzerland
- Language: Polish

Szamanka (Polish pronunciation: [ʂaˈmaŋka]) is a 1996 erotic drama film directed by Andrzej Żuławski and adapted from a screenplay by Manuela Gretkowska. The film, which was controversial upon its release in Poland, follows the obsessive relationship between an anthropology professor and a strange young woman only known as the "Italian". The title is the feminine form of the word "shaman" in Polish.

== Plot ==
In Warsaw, a student only known as "the Italian" (Polish: Włoszka), played by Iwona Petry, is on the search for an apartment. The Italian, a beautiful and free spirit, is originally from the countryside. During her search, she meets anthropology professor Michał (Bogusław Linda), who agrees to rent to her an apartment that was occupied by his brother. The business is concluded by a violent sex scene between the two in the empty apartment.

Michał is engaged with Anna (Agnieszka Wagner), an architect and the daughter of his boss. During excavations with his students and his younger colleague Juliuz (Paweł Deląg), they find the well-conserved, more than two thousand years old corpse of a shaman. In the laboratory, they study the mummified body, which is covered in mystical tattoos and is found to have a pouch of hallucinogenic mushrooms. They try to determine the cause of the shaman's death, which does not seem to be natural since the back of his skull has been crushed. They speculate the act was perhaps done to release his spirit after death.

Michał's life is turned upside down by the discovery of the shaman's body and his increasingly obsessive love affair with the Italian. He breaks up with his fiancée Anna and his friends. He tries to tame the Italian, but she resists his attempts at domination. In the laboratory, the researchers consume the shaman's mushrooms, and in a delirium attempt to bring him back to life. In a moment of illumination, Michał speaks with the spirit of the shaman who reveals that he was killed by a woman who wanted to capture his magic power.

Michał, who now regards himself as free and lucid, breaks up with the Italian. She bludgeons him to death, crushing the back of his skull, like the shaman's, and she eats his brain.

== Production ==
The screenplay had been written by Manuela Gretkowska, a Polish writer and feminist. The screenplay had initially been rejected by Polish Television due to its "controversial" content. The production was then financed by Canal + Polska, Visa Films, the French Compagnie des Films, and several private investors.

Written with a truly feminist mettle by a very young woman who has been enjoying dazzling literary success in Poland, the screenplay demands of the director a sense of restraint, mystery and depth that can make it address to young Europeans today. The violence, exuberance and sexuality of the author's text are as much signs of revolt as of intelligence. My hope is to respond to that freshness by consolidating it with maturity and an aesthetic sense that will bring out all its latent lyricism.

— Andrzej Żuławski

Actor Iwona Petry was chosen by Director Żuławski after he met her accidentally in a café in Warsaw. Petry was at the time a sociology student, with no previous acting experience. Although there were rumors in the Polish press that Żuławski used voodoo to improve the performance of Petry, she was in fact trained by French coach Harmel Sbraire, who had previously worked with Juliette Binoche. Bogusław Linda was chosen for the role of Michał because of his star status in Poland. Żuławski and Linda had a difficult relationship on the set and the two were even bitterly commenting on each other in the Polish press. Nevertheless, after completion of the film Żuławski called Linda a "charismatic actor".

The soundtrack was written by composer Andrzej Korzyński, who had also written the soundtrack for Żuławski's previous films Possession, The Silver Globe, and My Nights Are More Beautiful Than Your Days. It is an electronic score and relies on two main themes. The first main theme, Szamanka, is used primarily in mood transition scenes. The second main theme, Zdrowas Mario, is used first in the sex scene between the "Italian" and Michał.

The film was shot in Warsaw and Kraków. In Warsaw, shooting took place at the Warszawa Centralna railway station, in the Praga Północ district, and in the main administration building of the Polish railway PKP. In Kraków, the film was shot at the Central Station and the University of Science and Technology.

== Responses ==
The film generated some controversy in Poland due to its explicit depiction of sex and its criticism of traditional morality and Catholicism. Due to its scandalous nature, it was nicknamed "Last Tango in Warsaw" by Polish critics. Polish authorities permitted only a limited release, allowing just two late screenings a day in select theaters. In Poland, the film sold about 400,000 tickets. In France, the film had a limited theatrical release and sold 11,150 tickets.

Szamanka was also screened at the 53rd Venice International Film Festival.

Variety wrote that the picture "may please rebellious youth at home and the voyeur crowd abroad, but few others will sit through this overlong study of straining faces, quivering limbs and random violence, whose larger message somehow gets lost as the number of sex scenes reaches double digits."

== See also ==
- Cinema of Poland
- List of Polish language films
