= Cosmos (2015 film) =

2015 film directed by Andrzej Żuławski

- Directed by: Andrzej Żuławski
- Screenplay by: Andrzej Żuławski
- Based on: Cosmos by Witold Gombrowicz
- Produced by: Paulo Branco
- Starring: Sabine Azéma; Jean-François Balmer
- Cinematography: André Szankowski
- Edited by: Julia Gregory
- Music by: Andrzej Korzyński
- Production companies: Alfama Films; Leopardo Filmes
- Distributed by: Alfama Films
- Release dates: 8 August 2015 (Locarno); 9 December 2015 (France)
- Running time: 102 minutes
- Countries: France; Poland
- Language: French
- Budget: €1.6 million

Cosmos is a 2015 French-Portuguese speculative fiction thriller film written and directed by Andrzej Żuławski based on the novel of the same name by Witold Gombrowicz.

== Production ==
Cosmos was Andrzej Żuławski's first film in 15 years and ended up being his final film; he died in February 2016. It was produced through Paulo Branco's Alfama Films in collaboration with the Portuguese company Leopardo Filmes. Principal photography took place from mid-November to late December 2014.

== Plot synopsis ==
A young man, hoping to write a novel, visits a French guest house with a friend and finds himself distracted by a mystery and the strange inhabitants of the home.

== Cast ==
- Jean-François Balmer as Leon
- Sabine Azéma as Madame Woytis
- Jonathan Genet as Witold
- Johan Libéreau as Fuchs
- Victória Guerra as Lena
- Clémentine Pons as Catherette / Ginette

== Critical reception and awards ==
The film premiered in competition at the 2015 Locarno International Film Festival, where it won the award for Best Direction.

Time Out, giving it 4/5 stars, wrote that, "as with all of Zulawski’s work," the film "is essentially unclassifiable," adding that it is, "at times, astonishingly beautiful" as well as "entrancing, frustrating, and utterly singular." Noting that "the enigma at the centre of Zulawski’s work is that he’s trying to film the unspeakable," CinemaScope's Christof Huber stated that the film is "hardly lacking in perversity, sex, and violence, not to mention fierce freak-out acting spectaculars" but "the manic-depressive tone of [the director's] earlier films has been replaced by a state of constant agitation." By Cosmos's ending, he concluded, "the equilibrium of existence has been...thoroughly pierced." Variety reviewer Peter Debruge opined that the film could be described as "frustrating, yes, but boring, never," containing "enough sexual tension percolating beneath the surface to spark a second Big Bang." He added, however, that, during its length, "the film grows increasingly difficult to interpret" and that "mainstream [audiences] would sooner stick to more conventional entertainments." In Roger Ebert's website, critic Scout Tafoya gave 4/4 stars to a film "shaking with ecstasy, possibility and the torment of being alive." Cosmos, he wrote, is "everything at once too fast, like the broken merry-go-round, sudden inebriation, or a magic trick. Real life is only steps away, but you'll never find anything as brutally fantastic out there."

For A. O. Scott of The New York Times, the film "feels more like a revival than a new release. It can inspire [the audience] to think fondly back on the work of Alain Resnais...or Raúl Ruiz" and "leaves a curiously paradoxical aftertaste." It’s "an exercise in nostalgic avant-gardism, a retro-modernist trip down aesthetic paths that have long since been blocked off, overgrown or paved over."

The Guardian's Mike McCahill found it to be "a characteristically eccentric outing that descends into impenetrable gibberish" with "even the sharper scenes soon clot[ting] into an impenetrable layer of gibberish tics." Filmuphoria's review pointed out that the "viscous plot and rake-thin premise" of the film are making it "impossible for any of the myriad ideas put forth to take hold with any lasting thematic coherence," and asserted that the film's "crazed maximalism and heightened delirium make [it] a dramatic exercise rather than a drama per se."

The review aggregator website Rotten Tomatoes cited a cumulative rating of 77%, and an average rating of 7.10/10, based on 31 reviews. Metacritic assigned the film a weighted average score of 74 out of 100, based on 14 critics, indicating "generally favorable reviews".
