= My Nights Are More Beautiful Than Your Days =

1989 film by Andrzej Żuławski

- Theatrical release poster
- French: Mes nuits sont plus belles que vos jours
- Directed by: Andrzej Żuławski
- Screenplay by: Andrzej Żuławski
- Based on: My Nights Are More Beautiful Than Your Days by Raphaële Billetdoux
- Produced by: Alain Sarde
- Starring: Sophie Marceau; Jacques Dutronc; Valérie Lagrange; Myriam Mézières; Laure Killing; François Chaumette; Sady Rebbot
- Cinematography: Patrick Blossier
- Edited by: Marie-Sophie Dubus
- Music by: Andrzej Korzyński
- Production company: Saris
- Distributed by: Acteurs Auteurs Associés
- Release date: 19 April 1989 (France)
- Running time: 110 minutes
- Country: France
- Language: French

My Nights Are More Beautiful Than Your Days (French: Mes nuits sont plus belles que vos jours) is a 1989 French romantic drama film written and directed by Andrzej Żuławski, based on the 1985 novel of the same name by Raphaële Billetdoux. In unique dialogue full of rhymes, puns and quotations, it tells the story of a sudden love affair between two gifted but damaged people.

== Plot ==
In Paris, Lucas is a talented and successful computer scientist who is diagnosed with a rare and fatal brain disorder, which means he will rapidly lose his memory and his ability to speak coherently. Going from the hospital to a café, he is struck by a beautiful but eccentric young woman called Blanche. When she walks out on him just after he orders them dinner, he waits in the street until dawn. Driving by, she stops and weeps at his devotion, but has to go to work.

Her job is in a hotel at Biarritz, where she does a clairvoyant act removing her clothes. He follows her there and takes a luxury suite. At dawn she comes in exhausted and falls asleep. Just after he orders them breakfast she walks out, not realising that his awkward remarks are through failing mental powers.

Later she returns and the two make love. She too is under heavy stress, forced by her promiscuous mother into an exploitative act she detests. That night she breaks down on stage and at dawn comes to find Lucas. He takes her onto the deserted beach, where the two laugh and kiss as they walk to their deaths in the Atlantic breakers.

== Cast ==
- Sophie Marceau as Blanche
- Jacques Dutronc as Lucas
- Valérie Lagrange as Blanche's mother
- Myriam Mézières as Edwige
- Laure Killing as Ines
- François Chaumette as hotel concierge
- Sady Rebbot as François
- Salim Talbi as Page
