= Cosmos (Gombrowicz novel) =

1965 novel by Witold Gombrowicz

Cosmos is a 1965 novel by the Polish author Witold Gombrowicz. The narrative revolves around two young men who seek the solitude of the country; their peace is disturbed when a set of random occurrences suggest to their susceptible minds a pattern with sinister meanings. The humour arises, as it often does in Gombrowicz's work, in the extremity of paranoia and confusion exhibited by the protagonist.

The novel was awarded the 1967 International Prize for Literature.

The 1967 English translation was from the French and German translations, rather than the Polish original. In 2004, Danuta Borchardt received a National Endowment for the Arts grant to enable her to prepare a revised translation directly from the Polish, a translation published by Yale University Press in 2005, and praised for its better renderings of Gombrowicz's complex language.

== Film ==
A film adaptation with the same title directed by Andrzej Żuławski won the Best Director award at the 68th Locarno Film Festival in Switzerland in 2015.

== Characters ==
- Witold – the narrator, who's had undefined troubles with his parents back in Warsaw
- Fuks – his "carroty" "fish-like" companion, escaping his oppressive work environment and his boss, Drozdowski, who for unknown reasons can't stand him
- Leon Wojtys – retired banker and pater familias; the family live on the outskirts of Zakopane, after moving from Drohobych, then Pułtusk, then Kielce
- Mrs. Wojtys, or "Roly-Poly" – his wife, from a slightly lower social class than her husband's
- Lena – their daughter, a teacher of foreign languages
- Ludwik – their son-in-law (he married Lena two months before the events in the novel), architect
- Katasia – Mrs. Wojtys's niece (from a peasant family in Grójec) and housekeeper, whose deformed upper lip is the result of an accident
- Lulu and Lukie, Tolo and Venomie Tolek- two newly married couples who accompany the rest on a trip to the country
