= Law & Order: Criminal Intent season 1 =

Season of American television series

Law & Order: Criminal Intent
- Season 1
- Season 1 U.S. DVD cover
- No. of episodes: 22

Release
- Original network: NBC
- Original release: September 30, 2001 – May 10, 2002

Season chronology
- Next → Season 2

The first season of Law & Order: Criminal Intent, an American police procedural television series, was developed by Dick Wolf and René Balcer. It began airing on September 30, 2001, on NBC, a national broadcast television network in the United States. It is the second spin-off of the long-running crime drama Law & Order.

Law & Order: Criminal Intent follows the New York City Police Department's fictional Major Case Squad, which investigates high-profile murder cases. The first season of twenty-two episodes concluded its initial airing on May 10, 2002. Four actors received star billing in the first season: Vincent D'Onofrio, Kathryn Erbe, Jamey Sheridan, and Courtney B. Vance.

Episodes depict Detectives Robert Goren (D'Onofrio) and Alexandra Eames (Erbe) as the squad's lead investigators. Captain James Deakins (Sheridan) is the detectives' direct supervisor and head of the Major Case Squad. Assistant District Attorney Ron Carver (Vance) often attempts to obtain confessions from the suspects, rather than taking them to trial. Law & Order: Criminal Intent focuses on the actions and motives of the criminals, and it divides screen time equally between the suspects and victims and the police's investigation.

The season was filmed on location in New York City. Scenes set inside the Major Case Squad department were filmed in a studio at Chelsea Piers, Manhattan.

The season was nominated for four awards and was described by some reviewers as the most impressive of all the Law & Order series. It was sold to numerous television stations around the world, and it has been adapted into localized foreign versions in Russia and France. It has been syndicated in the United States on a number of cable channels. A DVD box set of Season 1 was released in America on October 21, 2003, and episodes are available for purchase at the US iTunes Store and Amazon Video on Demand.

== Production ==
Law & Order: Criminal Intent is the third series in the Law & Order crime drama franchise, which was created by Dick Wolf in 1990. He developed it with René Balcer, who began working on the original series during its first season. During his time on Law & Order, Balcer was promoted to head writer, show runner, and executive producer before leaving in 2000. News first broke of a new series in late 2000, when it was reported that NBC, broadcaster of Law & Order and Law & Order: Special Victims Unit, approached Wolf Films and Studios USA about a second spin-off.

Balcer and Wolf conceived Law & Order: Criminal Intent as a police procedural crime drama that follows a distinct division of the New York City Police Department: the 'Major Case Squad', and its investigations in to high-profile murder cases, such as those involving VIPs, local government officials and employees, and people working in the financial industry and the arts and entertainment world. Unlike the other series in the Law & Order franchise, Law & Order: Criminal Intent gives significant attention to the actions and motives of the criminals, rather than primarily focusing on the police investigation and trial prosecution. Episodes do not contain trials, and end in confessions rather than plea bargains or verdicts.

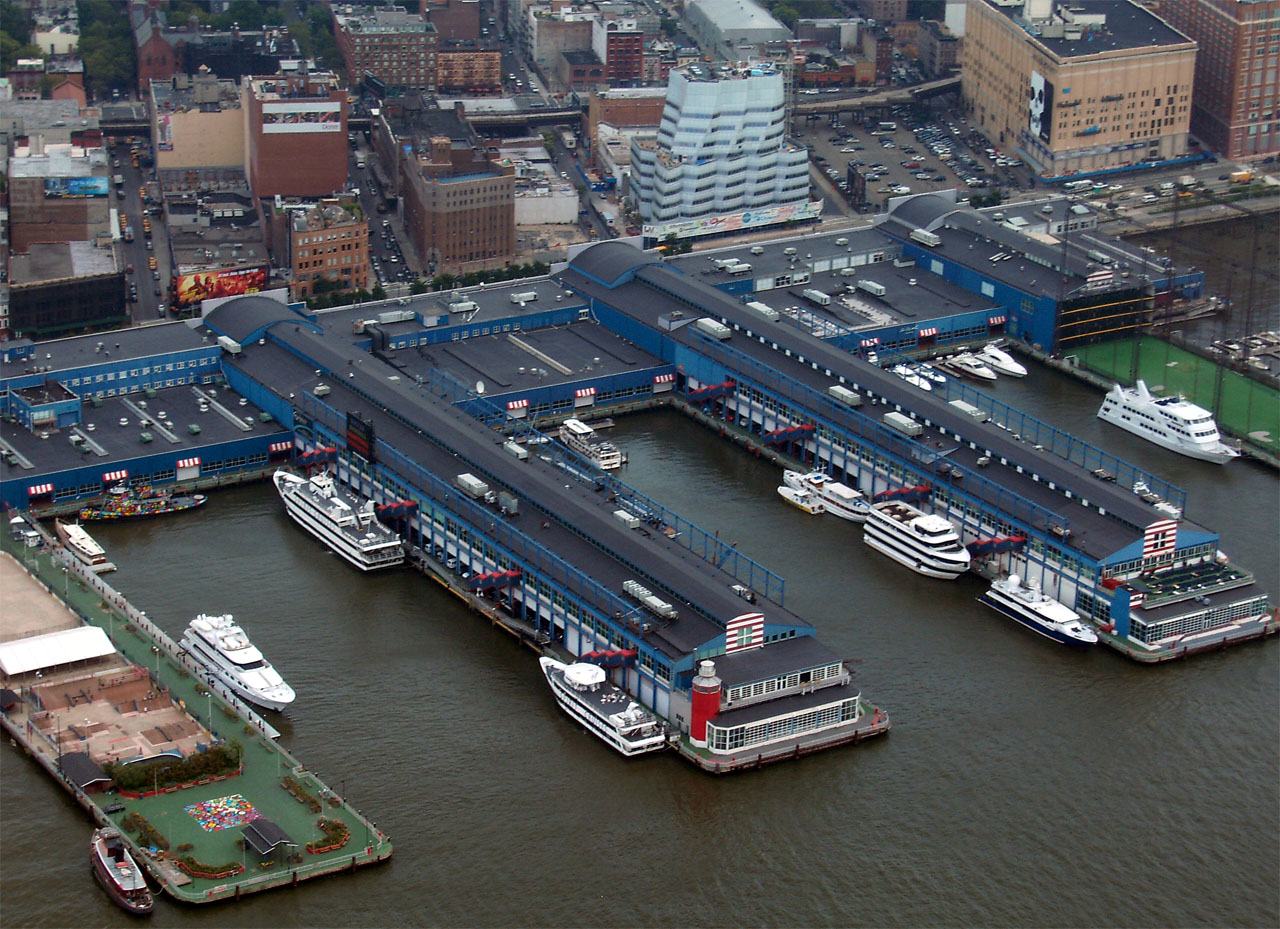
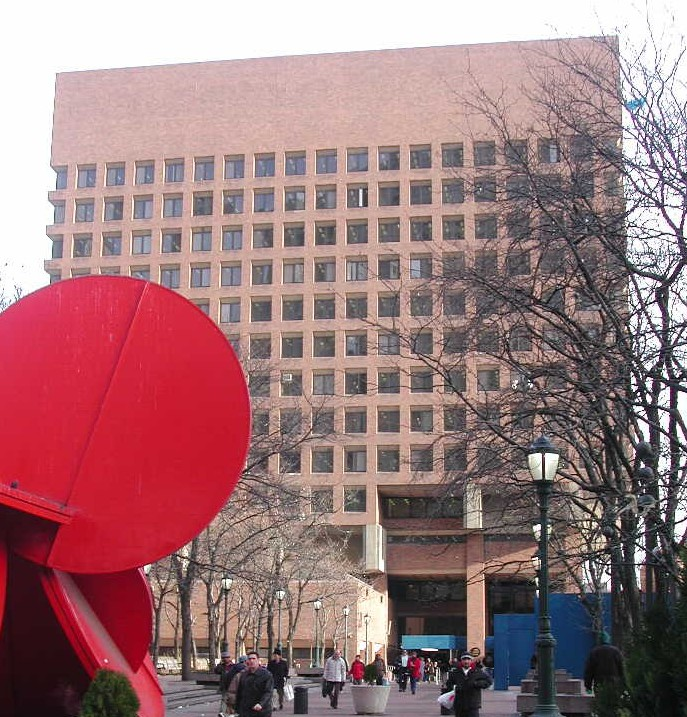
The Silver Screen Studios soundstages at Chelsea Piers, Manhattan, contains the set used to depict One Police Plaza, the real headquarters of the NYPD.

Production began in January 2001, shooting on location in and around New York City using local color. The main set of One Police Plaza is located in the Silver Screen Studios soundstages at Chelsea Piers, Manhattan. Thirteen episodes were initially ordered, and were completed by April 2001, so that production would not be halted by a potential strike from the Writers Guild of America. Balcer was the show runner, executive producer and head writer on the first season of Law & Order: Criminal Intent. Wolf was also credited as an executive producer, as with all other Law & Order series. The first season gave co-executive producers credits to Peter Jankowski, Fred Berner, Geoffrey Neigher, and Arthur W. Forney. John L. Roman, Roz Weinman, and Eric Overmyer were named producers, with Michael Kewley a co-producer. Theresa Rebeck and Marlane Meyer were consulting producers. Twelve people directed, and nine people wrote the twenty-two episodes; Constantine Makris directed four episodes, and Balcer wrote or co-wrote ten episodes.

== Cast ==
Season 1 cast members: (left to right) Courtney B. Vance, Vincent D'Onofrio, Kathryn Erbe, and Jamey Sheridan

Law & Order: Criminal Intent is not an ensemble series, and therefore differs from Law & Order and Law & Order: Special Victims Unit which respectively featured six and eight actors receiving star billing during the same broadcast season. Movie actor Vincent D'Onofrio was offered the lead role of Detective Robert Goren, a hyper-intuitive contemporary Sherlock Holmes-type investigator who used to work for the US Military Police. Other than a 1998 guest role on Homicide: Life on the Street that earned him an Emmy nomination, this was D'Onofrio's first major television role. Goren's partner, former vice squad detective Alexandra Eames, was played by Kathryn Erbe who had just completed a role on Oz as convicted murderer Shirley Bellinger. Balcer stated Eames was cast because "she just looked like a real cop." Courtney B. Vance plays Assistant District Attorney Ron Carver, a graduate of John Jay College of Criminal Justice. Jamey Sheridan was the last actor to be cast in a main role, taking the part of James Deakins, a "seasoned" NYPD Captain. In a recurring role, Leslie Hendrix appeared as Assistant Chief Medical Examiner Elizabeth Rodgers, the same character she had played in the other two series. Steve Zirnkilton provides a voice-over at the beginning of each episode's opening credits, saying "In New York City's war on crime, the worst criminal offenders are pursued by the detectives of the Major Case Squad. These are their stories."

There were several guest stars in the episodes of this series, such as:

- Jake Weber as Karl Atwood, a professional thief and murderer
- Lenny Venito as Jake Nathan, an accomplice of Karl Atwood
- Dianne Wiest as Intern D.A. Nora Lewin
- Elizabeth Marvel as Sylvia Moon, an artist and at the same time a triple murderer and a forger
- Lynn Cohen as Mina Cohen, employee of the Holocaust Foundation
- Michael O'Keefe as Father Michael McShale, the church father St. Justin and the murderer of Kevin Donovan
- Alex Feldman as Kevin Donovan, Father McShale's drug-addicted son and Morris Abernathy's killer
- Peter McRobbie as Father Capanna
- Stephen Henderson as Morris Abernathy, the sacristan of St. Justin church who is assassinated by Donovan
- Roy Thinnes as Sheridan Beckworth
- Griffin Dunne as Henry Talbott, a corrupt lawyer and a serial killer
- Karen Young as Denise Talbott, Henry's credulous wife
- Thomas G. Waites as Mo Turman, the owner of Mo's Diner cafeteria
- Eric Thal as Denis Dupont / Didier Foucault, a Swiss swindler and murderer
- John Doman as Roy Markham
- Terry Serpico as Leslie Roche
- Steven Marcus as Tom Santini
- Jerry Orbach as Det. Lennie Briscoe
- Jesse L. Martin as Det. Ed Green
- John Heard as Larry Wiegert
- Robert Hogan as Judge Van Vliet
- Kate Burton as Stephanie Uffland
- Robert Lyle Knepper as Dr. Peter Kelmer, a plastic surgeon who murdered his wife
- David Aaron Baker as Edward Sternman
- Lothaire Bluteau as Rick Zainer, a nurse and at the same time, a facilitator of assassinations
- Robert Stanton as Dennis Griscom, a Christian fanatic and at the same time, a sniper and murderer who killed Leo Cavella, an abortion doctor
- Michael Gross as Dr. Charles Webb, a psychiatrist and at the same time, a murderer
- J. K. Simmons as Dr. Emil Skoda
- Jenna Stern as Julie Feldman, a murder suspect, but later found innocent
- Ritchie Coster as Simon Matic, a former Serb Volunteer Guard soldier, muscle mafia, kidnapper and rapist
- Frank Pellegrino as Carl Pettijohn
- Michael Murphy as Judge Peter Blakemore, a corrupt judge
- George DiCenzo as Judge Raoul Sabatelli, a book author and supreme court judge who murdered Emily Trudeau
- Michael Emerson as Gerry Rankin, a con man and double murderer posing as a United Nations economist
- David Thornton as Kenneth Strick, a real estate heir who murdered his friend IIana Yushka
- Alla Kliouka Schaffer as Ilana Yushka, a book author and daughter of a prominent Russian mobster, murdered by her friend Kenneth Strick
- Viola Davis as Sergeant Terry Randolph, Lieutenant Van Buren's student who became a dirty cop, serial killer, and family annihilator
- S. Epatha Merkerson as Lt. Anita Van Buren
- Mia Dillon as Barb Windemere, a woman who claims to be Erica Windemere's adoptive mother, but later, was false
- Remak Ramsay as Douglas Lafferty, a reporter who was interested in the story of Erica Windemere, when he discovered that it was a "house of cards", was going to make it public, but was killed by the book editor, Christine Wilkes
- Polly Draper as Christine Wilkes, a book editor who became famous for her book Through the Darkness, which recounted the story of Erica Widemere, a girl who was raped. When reporter Douglas Lafferty discovered that the story was false and was used to steal people's money, Wilkes murdered him so that he would not expose the truth
- Bruce Altman as Jack Crawley, a con artist, conspirator, and power assassin who acts as the chief financial officer of Mattawin Corporation, a company dedicated to the sale of water and land

== Distribution ==
The first season of Law & Order: Criminal Intent premiered during the 2001–2002 television season on the American terrestrial television network NBC. The pilot episode, titled "One", aired on Sunday September 30, 2001 at 9:00 p.m. EST. Episodes aired weekly until December, when the show took a brief hiatus until January, and took another hiatus during February. The final episode of the season aired at 9:00 p.m. on Friday May 10, 2002. Under a $100,000-per-episode shared or second window syndication agreement that cable channel USA Network made with NBC, USA Network was allowed to broadcast episodes out of primetime a week after their premiere on NBC. The season is also under a regular off-network syndication deal at USA Networks and Bravo. The two channels teamed up late 2004 to pay $2 million per episode for the syndication rights to the series, allowing USA Network to air episodes during the week, and Bravo to air episodes at the weekend. In 2007, Fox Television Stations, a group of Fox Broadcasting Company owned-and-operated stations, entered a syndication deal to broadcast episodes as part of its daytime schedule. From late 2009, MyNetworkTV will broadcast Law & Order: Criminal Intent, including episodes from season one, having changed their business model from a network broadcaster to a syndication programming service. The series has also been distributed to international broadcasters. It aired in Canada on CTV, in France on TF1, in the United Kingdom on Hallmark Channel and Five, in Australia on Network Ten, and in New Zealand on TV3.

Episodes of Law & Order: Criminal Intent's first season have been adapted into localized foreign versions. Russian: Закон и порядок: Преступный умысел (lit. Law & Order: Criminal Mind), premiered in 2007 on NTV (Russia) and is produced by Global American Television, Studio2B and NTV, Wolf Films and NBC Universal. On May 3, 2007, the French Law & Order: Criminal Intent broadcaster, TF1, began airing Paris enquêtes criminelles, a co-production from TF1 and ALMA, Wolf Films and NBC Universal. All eight episodes of Paris enquêtes criminelles's first season, two episodes from the second season, and one third-season episode were adapted from Law & Order: Criminal Intent first-season episodes. Wolf stated that Law & Order: Criminal Intent has been sold to foreign networks because it is easier to adapt into local legal systems than Law & Order, where half of each episode occurs in the courtroom.

The season is available in a number of new media formats. Universal Studios Home Entertainment released it in a 6-disc DVD box set on October 21, 2003, in Region 1, titled Law & Order: Criminal Intent – The First Year. The pilot episode was also released on a separate DVD on June 3, 2003. Consumers in the US can purchase and download episodes from the iTunes Store and Amazon Video on Demand.

== Reception ==
Laura Fries of Variety commented on the difference between this series and Law & Order and Law & Order: Special Victims Unit: "By scrutinizing motive and intent, Criminal Intent utilizes a more personal style that sets it apart from its brethren. Wolf's characters are notoriously devoid of detailed personal lives, but debut [episode] hints at a little more introspection on the part of the characters". In Entertainment Weekly, Ken Tucker wrote that Law & Order: Criminal Intent was the best series of the year from the Law & Order franchise and that while Law & Order suffered from tired, wooden performances from actors with poor chemistry, the acting on Law & Order: Criminal Intent was at "the other end of the spectrum." Both writers commented on the overpowering screen presence that D'Onofrio commands in the first episode: "Criminal Intent so far is a one-man show with Vincent D'Onofrio at its center. [He] commands the most attention, tending to overshadow Erbe, who is reduced in the pilot to following Goren with an awe-struck look," wrote Fries, while Tucker also stated, "D'Onofrio is so eccentrically entertaining, even his costar Kathryn Erbe seems fascinated", but complained that Erbe's role was smaller than D'Onofrio's, which "jibes with the subtle range she showed on [HBO's] Oz and proves her professional generosity." He also said Sheridan "is similarly nonplussed and under-utilized," but "Vance is terrific [as Carver], who makes defendants wither in the face of his elegantly reasoned cross-examinations."

Law & Order: Criminal Intent's first season received four nominations from three award ceremonies. "The Faithful" and "Smothered" were given commendations at the Prism Awards in the category for Best TV Drama Series Episode. Vance was nominated in the Outstanding Actor in a Drama Series category at the 2002 NAACP Image Awards. René Balcer received an Edgar Award nomination for "Tuxedo Hill". Casting director Lynn Kressel was nominated at the Casting Society of America Artios Awards in the category for Best Casting for TV in a Dramatic Pilot.

== Episodes ==
No. overall	No. in season	Title	Directed by	Written by	Original release date	Prod. code	U.S. viewers (millions)
1	1	"One"	Jean de Segonzac	S : Dick Wolf; T : René Balcer	September 30, 2001	E2101	12.80
Detectives Robert Goren and Alexandra Eames investigate a diamond heist in a house that left two occupants and one thief dead. The criminal who planned the robbery, Karl Atwood (Jake Weber ), jumped parole in Canada and crossed the border and attempted to deceive the police into believing the theft is related to the mafia. Goren and Eames track down and interview Atwood's girlfriend Gia (Michele Hicks) and suggest to her that Atwood contracted AIDS in prison and has infected her, offering leniency and medical treatment if she helps them arrest Atwood. She leads them to Atwood, and when diamond buyers appear, Goren and Eames arrest them all. Goren then informs Gia that he lied about her being infected with HIV. Special appearance by Dianne Wiest as DA Nora Lewin
2	2	"Art"	David Platt	Elizabeth M. Cosin	October 7, 2001	E2110	11.27
Anne Ellis (Toby Poser) and Bernard Jackson (Tom Bloom), two art authenticators, are involved in an apparent murder-suicide; Ellis has been hanged and Jackson shot in the chest. The investigation leads Goren and Eames to a forged Claude Monet painting and the detectives suspect German art gallery owner Rudy Langer (Tomas Arana) is involved in their murder. This inquiry links to a female forger and former student of Jackson's, Sylvia Moon (Elizabeth Marvel) whose art-school roommate apparently committed suicide by hanging herself. After confronting Moon and Langer at the murder scene, Moon confesses that she and Langer were involved in the murders of Jackson and Ellis.
3	3	"Smothered"	Michael Fields	Marlane Gomard Meyer	October 14, 2001	E2111	14.50
Goren and Eames investigate the murder of Lois Romney (Funda Duval), a pregnant woman who has given up her drug addiction and is struggling to stay clean. It initially appears that the murderer is the victim's unstable junkie boyfriend, Dale van Acker (Geoffrey Nauffts). However their investigation leads them to the boyfriend's wealthy and domineering socialite mother, Priscilla van Acker (Kathleen Chalfant), a sociopath who disapproved of her son's girlfriend and arranged to kill her and frame her philandering husband at the same time.
4	4	"The Faithful"	Constantine Makris	Stephanie Sengupta	October 17, 2001	E2104	19.32
Goren and Eames investigate the death of a Catholic church sexton, Morris Abernathy. They begin to suspect Kevin Donovan (Alex Feldman), a thieving drug addict who works at the church, until he is found murdered in his apartment. As Goren and Eames delve into the church's business, they uncover the embezzlement of money from the collection funds, and believe it was by Abernathy who tried to frame Donovan. When they realize someone performed last rites over Donovan's body, the detectives suspect a priest is responsible. They are led to Father Michael McShale (Michael O'Keefe) who they eventually discover had fathered Donovan with one Melanie Grasso (Dana Reeve) twenty years ago and had been embezzling church funds to support Donovan. He eventually killed his drug-addicted and violent son when he realized the youth had uncovered the address of his mother.
5	5	"Jones"	Frank Prinzi	S : René Balcer; S/T : Geoffrey Neigher	October 21, 2001	E2114	13.06
Detectives Goren and Eames investigate the murder of a pretty, petite woman Angie Suarez (Daniella Alonso) found drowned in her bathtub. Days later, a second petite woman is found naked and washed up on the shore. This is followed by the discovery of a strangled third female, and then a fourth. They discover a link between all four – Henry Talbott (Griffin Dunne), an abusive, drug-addicted lawyer who acted for them in compensation lawsuits and became their boyfriend so he could use money from their settlements to feed his gambling addictions. The detectives have to work against the clock to gather their evidence before he kills a fifth woman and they finally convince his loyal wife Denise (Karen Young) to help their investigation.
6	6	"The Extra Man"	Jean de Segonzac	Marlane Gomard Meyer	October 28, 2001	E2106	12.62
Detectives Goren and Eames investigate the murder of a man found beaten to death in a hotel suite. It appears the victim was Didier Foucault (Eric Thal), a Swiss conman using the name of Denis Dupont who cheated a group of wealthy investors and romanced their wives. Further evidence reveals that the body is not Foucault, but his assistant Felix Perez. The detectives discover that the investors hired a hitman to teach Foucault a severe lesson. The hitman mistakenly attacked Perez, leaving him alive but Foucault returned to the hotel and brutally killed him, making identification impossible. Goran convinces ADA Carver to indict the investors on false murder charges, while he works in secret to lure Foucault out of hiding so they can arrest him for Perez's murder.: Inspired by the life of Christophe Rocancourt.
7	7	"Poison"	Gloria Muzio	Stephanie Sengupta	November 11, 2001	E2108	11.77
Goran and Eames are called in to investigate an anonymous call from a hospital about three alleged murders. Goren detects cyanide poisoning and initially suspects Colleen Braxton (Susan Bruce), a nurse who fits the typical criminal profile of an angel of death but instead she exhibits Munchausen syndrome. The poisonings continue while Braxton is in custody and the source of the cyanide is tracked down to a batch of laced over-the-counter Necedrol pills. The investigation turns to the victims' families which leads the detectives to a widow named Trudy Pomeranski (J. Smith-Cameron). The detectives suspect she killed her husband with cyanide and then laced other boxes of Necedrol around the city in an attempt to cover-up the murder and strengthen her lawsuit against the medical company. In order to catch Pomeranski, Goren encourages ADA Carver to indict Pomeranski's elderly mother for the murders and have detectives Ed Green (Jesse L. Martin) and Lennie Briscoe (Jerry Orbach) from the 27th Precinct to leak information about the case. This provokes Pomeranski into mailing a cyanide laced letter to the Ledger newspaper in order to clear her mother. However, she is surveilled and subsequently arrested for the murders.
8	8	"The Pardoner's Tale"	Steve Shill	Theresa Rebeck	November 18, 2001	E2112	12.83
Investigative news reporter Derek Fried (Matt Servitto) and his girlfriend are gunned down by Greg Genereet in the street assisted by his friend Phil to pay of their debts. The detectives learn that the reporter had a history of uncovering police corruption. Their investigation into the deaths leads to the buying and selling of pardons, and a connection to organized crime by assemblyman Jack Nawrocki (Joseph Siravo). However, when their investigation leads them through lawyer Larry Wiegert (John Heard) to the state governor Carver is unwilling to pursue corruption to that level, putting him at odds with the ethics of Goren and Eames.
9	9	"The Good Doctor"	Constantine Makris	Geoffrey Neigher	November 25, 2001	E2103	14.04
Goren and Eames investigate the disappearance of an adulterous drug-addicted wife of a plastic surgeon. While the doctor says he has attempted to locate his wife, the detectives suspect he is lying, especially when they discover he also has a secret lover but they struggle to find any flaws in his alibi. Weeks later, body parts of a decomposed woman wash ashore, so the detectives arrange for a false story to be printed in the newspapers, claiming they are from the missing woman. The detectives wait for the husband's reaction when he reads the article, hoping that they can turn his strong ego against him and discover the truth.: Inspired by the case of Doctor Robert Bierenbaum, who was convicted of murdering his wife, Gail Katz Bierenbaum.
10	10	"Enemy Within"	John David Coles	David Black	December 9, 2001	E2107	10.81
The Major Case Squad investigate the death of Harold Sternman (George Martin), an elderly and paranoid banker who died in the penthouse suite of his own luxury apartment building during an arson fire. The investigation centers Harold's dysfunctional family, consisting of his young trophy wife Kit (Laila Robins), his alcoholic son Edward (David Aaron Baker), and Rick Zainer (Lothaire Bluteau), Harold's private nurse. When DNA from Kit and Edward are found in Harold's bed, Goren and Eames suspect Harold was using them as evidence to get divorced from Kit, but both Kit and Edward deny sleeping with each other and Edward is gay. Suspicion falls on Zainer, who admits to sleeping with Edward and turning the three family members against each other as revenge for Harold failing to deliver on a promise to write letters of recommendation for Zainer's sons to enter an elite private school. Goren and Eames conclude that Kit conspired with Edward to kill Harold yo get her inheritance while Edward would be left the apartment building. Both are charged with the murder, but they also charge Zainer for failing is his duty of care as a nurse.
11	11	"The Third Horseman"	Constantine Makris	René Balcer	January 6, 2002	E2115	12.29
Goren and Eames investigate the sniping murder of an abortion doctor Leo Cavella (Michael Countryman) who was shot in his own apartment. The detectives are convinced that an anti-abortion activist Dennis Griscom (Robert Stanton) is to blame and begin tracking him through his contacts, Mr. and Mrs. McLeish (Nesbitt Blaisdell and Phyllis Somerville)). When they find evidence of a second rifle, they suspect Griscom is seeking a second victim and track him down via an anti-abortionist, Lorne Cutler (Leo Burmester), meanwhile, ADA Carver worries about Goren turning a murder case into a test about abortion before a jury. Goren discovers that Griscom has a grudge against the judge who had approved an abortion for his former girlfriend and catches him before he can murder the judge.
12	12	"Crazy"	Steve Shill	René Balcer	January 13, 2002	E2102	13.31
Heart surgeon, Larry Feldman (Danny Maseng), is murdered at the Bar Mitzvah of his son. Goren and Eames realize that Feldman had recently gone through a bitter divorce, and that his bitter ex-wife, Julie (Jenna Stern), asserted that he committed child sexual abuse against their daughter Sophie. As their investigation deepens, the detectives' attention turns to Charles Webb (Michael Gross), a forensic psychiatrist who often testified as an expert witness for ADA Carver in criminal trials. The detectives discover that after becoming obsessed with Sara Lindstrom (Stephanie Seymour), Julie's sister, Webb hired a corrupt detective, Officer Michael Stovic (David Lansbury) to murder Feldman in an attempt to gain her affections by helping Julie gain custody of their children. When charged for murder, Feldman's attorney presents an insanity defense, however Goren proves that the insanity plea is bogus.
13	13	"The Insider"	Jan Egleson	Elizabeth M. Cosin	January 27, 2002	E2105	12.97
The detectives investigate the murder of Wharton Carlyle (Jeff Hayenga), found stabbed to death in a yacht marina. They interview the victim's teenaged daughter, Lilly Carlyle (Aleksa Palladino), a frequent nightclub goer with drug and alcohol addiction. During the investigation, Goren and Eames' suspicions turn to the nightclub owner John Hampton (Adam Trese) who has close connections with organized crime. When the detectives look deeper into the case, they discover their main suspect, Hampton, is an undercover FBI agent posing as a thug to infiltrate a drugs ring. The detectives and the FBI clash over the conflict of interests but the DA's office eventually get their man.
14	14	"Homo Homini Lupis"	David Platt	René Balcer	March 3, 2002	E2113	11.61
Unable to raise money to make a payment to Carl Pettijohn (Frank Pellegrino), a dangerous loan shark, stockbroker Lucas Colter (James Colby) returns home from a morning jog to find that his family is missing. Colter's mother-in-law goes to the Major Case Squad with her suspicions that the family was kidnapped for ransom but Colter makes repeated excuses and denials to detectives Goren and Eames. When the kidnappers begin threatening the lives of his family, and rape his eldest daughter, Maggie (Stephi Lineburg), Colter asks his father, Melvin (Jordan Charney), for help in paying off the loan shark and the family is returned. The family initially deny that they were kidnapped until Goren gains the trust of Maggie who is suffering from Stockholm syndrome but recalls a distinctive tattoo on her rapist. The detectives track down Pettijohn, who gives up the names of his bagman which leads them to Simon Matic (Ritchie Coster), a former Serbian soldier. While being interviewed, Goran goads Matic into revealing his tattoo which matches the sketch provided by Maggie.
15	15	"Semi-Professional"	Gloria Muzio	S : René Balcer; S/T : Stephanie Sengupta	March 10, 2002	E2118	8.64
The body of Emily Trudeau (Jacqueline Murphy), a court clerk, is found in the home of her married lover, Judge Peter Blakemore (Michael Murphy), a candidate for an open seat on the appellate court. Goren and Eames find that, despite being held in high regard by the legal community as an expert in the area of intellectual property law, the law review articles attributed to Blakemore were actually written by Trudeau. The murder investigation leads the Major Case Squad to Arnie Cox (Bruce MacVittie), a low-profile ex-convict with links to one of Blakemore's appellate seat rivals, Judge Raoul Sabatelli (George DiCenzo). The detectives find Sabatelli was incensed at Blakemore's success from being born into a wealthy and well-connected family and his exploitation of Trudeau's talent. They establish that Sabatelli pressured Cox into killing her and stealing her laptop computer in an attempt to expose Blakemore's plagiarism.
16	16	"Phantom"	Juan J. Campanella	S : René Balcer; S/T : Marlane Gomard Meyer	March 17, 2002	E2116	11.93
Detectives Goren and Eames investigate the murder of a paroled bank robber Frank Caspari (Andrew Fiscell), killed only two days after he was released from Sing Sing prison. During the investigation, Goren and Eames visit the victim's sister, Charlotte Fielding (Charlotte Caspari) (Cara Buono) and her boyfriend, Gerry Rankin (Michael Emerson). Rankin is a mysterious man living a double life who leads everyone to believe that he is an economist for the United Nations, but the detectives discover that is a lie. For years he has been unemployed, using money from his father's estate and father-in-law's savings to maintain the deception. After Charlotte Fielding is found unconscious and barely alive, the detectives close in on Rankin. Goren suspects that he may be planning to kill his children and after taking him down, Goren manages to talk him out of it and capture him.
17	17	"Seizure"	Michael Fields	S : René Balcer; S/T : Hall Powell	March 31, 2002	E2119	11.67
Detectives Goren and Eames investigate the murder of Rosa Dern (Adrianna Sevan) a woman found slain in a hotel room in a manner similar to the "Motel Ripper", Kevin Riddick (Jack Gwaltney) a serial killer in prison on remand. The investigation leads them to a human behavior research institute run by psychiatrist Dr. Roger Buckman (James Naughton) studying limbic trigger syndrome where he theorizes that killers have a specific limbic lesion which can lead to rage killing with potentially diminished legal culpability. Their attention turns to his research assistant Dr. Cathleen Dwyer (Jenny Bacon), a shy woman. They discover that Riddick does not have the lesion, but Dwyer does, and she committed the murder under the influence of Riddick, subtly influenced by Buckman who is seeking to have his theory recognized.
18	18	"Yesterday"	Jean de Segonzac	S : René Balcer; S/T : Theresa Rebeck	April 14, 2002	E2117	10.34
Detectives Goren and Eames investigate the discovery of a woman's body wrapped in plastic on the banks of the Bronx River. The well-preserved body shows signs that she was subject to substantial physical torture before being killed and they learn that she was Alyssa Cooney, reported missing 20 years previously. Chemical residue leads Goren and Eames to the former family home of Rick Morrissey (Danton Stone), a drug-addicted man. When Morrissey falls to his death from a rooftop, the detectives focus their investigation on his college classmate, Jay Lippman (Jim True-Frost), a former chess master who is now a married and a successful control-oriented mechanical engineer. The detectives link him to another similar murder where a prostitute was drugged, raped, tortured and killed. With no physical evidence to link Lippman to the murders Goren and Eames provoke his need for control to trick him into confessing during their interrogation.
19	19	"Maledictus"	Frank Prinzi	S : René Balcer; S/T : Stephanie Sengupta	April 21, 2002	E2122	11.45
The severed head of author Ilana Yushka (Alla Kliouka Schaffer) is sent to her publisher. Detectives Goren and Eames initially suspect her jailed Russian mob boss father had ordered the killing after she announced plans to write a second book about the family business, however someone else killed her before the Russians. Further investigations lead to one of her previous private school classmates, a self-tortured and cross-dressing real estate magnate Kenneth Strick (David Thornton). Research into the apparent suicidal death by poisoning of Strick's pregnant mother when Kenneth was a schoolboy lead Goren and Eames to the realization that he feared he would be exposed in the proposed book for murdering his mother because he had told Ilana he was responsible.
20	20	"Badge"	Constantine Makris	S : René Balcer; S/T : Marlane Gomard Meyer	April 28, 2002	E2124	13.44
Goren and Eames investigate the murder-suicide of a city auditor, Ron Sherwood (Jack Koenig) who appears to have killed his family and then himself, but an close analysis of the crime scene suggests they were all murdered. Goren and Eames learn that the dead man had uncovered a scandal involving retired police officers working for the city school district's School Security Division while still drawing their police pensions. Evidence of the murders points towards the ringleader, Sergeant Terry Randolph (Viola Davis) a particularly tough female School officer with a need for money to keep her daughters in an expensive private school. The Major Case Squad enlist the aid of Police Lieutenant Anita Van Buren (S. Epatha Merkerson) to help trap her.
21	21	"Faith"	Ed Sherin	S : René Balcer; S/T : Theresa Rebeck	April 28, 2002	E2121	15.34
Goren and Eames investigate the death of a wealthy publisher, Douglas Lafferty (Remak Ramsay), apparently killed in a car bomb but who had already been murdered. During the investigation they discover he had recently demanded to meet "Erica" an orphaned and disabled girl whose heart-wrenching and successful book he had published but whom he had never seen. The detectives also begin to doubt Erica's existence and suspect the girl's foster parents are running an elaborate money-making fraud. After interviewing Christine Wilkes (Polly Draper), editor of the book and one of Erica's greatest supporters, the detectives believe she killed her boss Lafferty. The Major Case Squad then sets up an elaborate trap to expose both the "foster parents" and Wilkes for their crimes.: Inspired by the Kaycee Nicole hoax.
22	22	"Tuxedo Hill"	Steve Shill	René Balcer	May 10, 2002	E2127	12.53
Goren and Eames investigate the assault and subsequent car accident of a corporate finance officer, Elizabeth Dawson (Cindy Katz), and the murder of her boyfriend. They stumble upon a corporate accounting fraud/stock manipulation scheme and discover that Dawson had initially refused to sign the corporation's statements because accounting irregularities. The detectives uncover evidence that her corporation's Chief Financial Officer Jack Crawley (Bruce Altman) had arranged for her car accident and for her to be subsequently framed for her boyfriend's murder. They establish that Crawley then offered to provide her with an alibi in exchange for signing the fraudulent accounting statements and boosting the company's stock value.: Inspired by the Enron scandal.

Start of series	List of Law & Order: Criminal Intent episodes	Succeeded by Season Two
