= Laure Killing =

French actress (1959–2019)

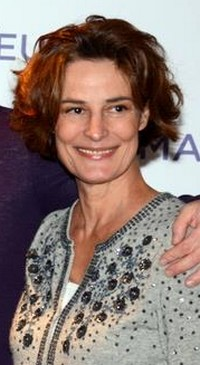
- Killing in 2013
- Born: 12 January 1959
- Died: 18 November 2019 (aged 60)
- Occupation: Actress
- Years active: 1986 – 2019
- Spouse: Bernard Lenteric (?– 2009; his death)

Laure Killing (12 January 1959 – 18 November 2019) was a French actress who appeared in more than fifty films from 1986 on.

Killing died of cancer on 18 November 2019, aged 60.

== Selected filmography ==
Film
Year	Title	Role	Notes
2013	Before the Winter Chill		
1994	The Teddy Bear		
1992	Love After Love		
1989	My Nights Are More Beautiful Than Your Days		
1987	Beyond Therapy		

TV
Year	Title	Role	Notes
2007–2008	Paris enquêtes criminelles	Juge Fontana	
1993	Spender - Episode 3	Janet Thornton	
1992	Moon and Son	Cecile Coulmier	
