= Mirosław Żuławski =

Polish writer and diplomat

Poland Ambassador to Senegal
- In office 1974–1977
- Succeeded by: Marian Stradowski

Personal details
- Born: 16 January 1913 Nisko, Austria-Hungary
- Died: 17 February 1995 (aged 82) Warsaw, Poland
- Party: Polish United Workers' Party
- Education: John Casimir University
- Profession: Diplomat, novelist

Mirosław Żuławski (16 January 1913 – 17 February 1995) was a Polish writer, prosaist, diplomat and screenwriter. He was father of film director, Andrzej Żuławski.

== Biography ==
Mirosław Żuławski was born in Nisko. He graduated in law and diplomatist studies from Lviv University (then John Casimir University in the Second Polish Republic). His career as a poet began in Sygnały magazine in 1934. During World War II he was a soldier of Związek Walki Zbrojnej, and then Armia Krajowa. In AK Żuławski operated in cultural underground and also wrote newsletters. During the years of 1944 and 1945 he was a war correspondent. After that he became as an editor-in-chief's assistant of Rzeczpospolita newspaper.

In 1945–1952 and 1957–1978 Żuławski worked in diplomacy as a permanent deputy of Poland in UNESCO in Paris. He was an ambassador of People's Republic of Poland (PRL) in Senegal and Mali. He was an editor of Przegląd Kulturalny weekly magazine from 1952 to 1957. Through the 1990s Żuławski published feuilletons in Twój Styl.

He died in 1995 in Warsaw.

== Honours ==
- Order of Polonia Restituta, Third Class
- Order of Polonia Restituta, Fourth Class
- Order of the Cross of Grunwald, Third Class (1946)
- Legion of Honour, Fourth Class
- National Order of Merit, Third Class
- Labor Order, First Class
- National Order of the Lion

== Notable works ==
- Ostatnia Europa, stories, 1947
- Trzy miniatury, 1947
- Rzeka Czerwona, novel, 1953
- Portret wroga, 1954
- Opowieść atlantycka, 1954
- Drzazgi bambusa, 1956
- Psia gwiazda, 1965
- Opowieści mojej żony, 1970
- Pisane nocą, feuilletons, 1973 (extended edition in 1976)
- Album domowe, 1997
- Ucieczka do Afryki, memories, 1983–1989

=== Screenplays ===
- Autobus odjeżdża 6.20 (a.k.a. The Bus Leaves at 6.20), script consultation, 1954
- Opowieść atlantycka (a.k.a. The Atlantic Tale), based on his own story, 1955
- Pieśń triumfującej miłości (a.k.a. The Story of Triumphant Love), 1967
- Pavoncello, 1967
- Trzecia część nocy (a.k.a. The Third Part of the Night), 1971
