= The Third Part of the Night =

- Original Polish release poster
- Directed by: Andrzej Żuławski
- Written by: Andrzej Żuławski; Mirosław Żuławski
- Starring: Małgorzata Braunek; Leszek Teleszyński; Jan Nowicki
- Cinematography: Witold Sobociński
- Edited by: Halina Prugar-Ketling
- Music by: Andrzej Korzyński
- Production company: Zespół Filmowy "Wektor"
- Distributed by: Centrala Wynajmu Filmów
- Release dates: 6 September 1971 (Venice Film Festival); 4 January 1972 (Poland)
- Running time: 105 minutes
- Country: Poland
- Language: Polish

The Third Part of the Night (Polish: Trzecia część nocy) is a 1971 Polish avant-garde psychological horror-drama film set in Nazi-occupied Poland. It was directed by Andrzej Żuławski.

== Plot ==
The film is set in Nazi-occupied Poland during World War II. Michał witnesses German soldiers murder his wife Marta, their young son, and his mother at the family's country villa; he and his father survive only because they are hiding in a nearby forest.

Resolving to join the resistance, Michał arrives for his first meeting just as the Gestapo kills his contact and pursues him through the town. He takes refuge in the apartment of a pregnant woman and helps her deliver her baby. The woman is the doppelgänger of his dead wife. Shaken, he wanders the occupied city, which grows steadily more nightmarish, and discusses miracles, meaning and cruelty with an acquaintance, Marian, after the two witness a German officer shoot a man in the street.

To obtain extra rations and a measure of protection, Michał takes work at a typhus institute as a louse feeder, allowing the lice used in vaccine production to feed on his blood. He brings the resulting vaccine and food to the woman and her child, growing increasingly attached to them while haunted by visions of his wife and of a small boy on a toy horse.

A masked man visits Michał, recalls dealings from before the war, and gives him a book marked at a passage describing a woman clothed with the sun, a dragon poised to devour her child, and a war in heaven in which Michael and his angels cast out the dragon. The man, named Rozenkranc, removes his mask outside and is shot by German agents. The woman's husband later returns to her, only to be shot beside her through a window.

Michał's conversations with his father turn progressively surreal, the older man insisting that the world has vanished and that Michał must adapt to "the new laws that govern the decay." The father eventually sets fire to his musical scores and dies in the flames. Resistance members are rounded up and killed, and Michał is pulled to safety from one trap at the last moment.

Returning to the hospital to end the suffering of a tortured man who has been mistaken for him, Michał is recognized and chased. In a long basement corridor he uncovers a stretcher bearing a corpse identical to himself. A shot strikes him in the neck, and as he bleeds he stumbles through rows of Gestapo cells, each holding a tortured prisoner, before finding himself back at the family villa where the killings began, his family's bodies still on the floor. A woman resembling his wife recites a verse about death as the Four Horsemen of the Apocalypse appear outside the window.

== Cast ==
- Małgorzata Braunek – Marta
- Leszek Teleszyński – Michał
- Michał Grudziński – Marian
- Jan Nowicki – Jan
- Marek Walczewski – Rozenkranc
- Jerzy Goliński – Michal's father
- Anna Milewska – Sister Klara

== Background ==
The story was inspired by the experiences of Zulawski's father Miroslaw who worked at the Weigel Institute in Nazi-occupied Lviv. Professor Weigl developed an original method of producing typhus vaccine. The method consisted of breeding lice vaccinated with typhus bacteria, and then preparing a vaccine for humans. The lice had to be fed with human blood. The institute was producing typhus vaccine for the German army, and Lviv residents were encouraged to become lice feeders. Those who participated were able to receive a certificate that gave some degree of protection during the occupation. Armia Krajowa (Polish Resistance) used it as a cover for its members.

== Production ==
The film was shot in 1970 in Kraków but the locations were selected to resemble Lwow, by then called Lviv and situated in Ukraine.

== Release ==
The Third Part of the Night debuted at the 1971 Venice Film Festival, and had its Polish premiere at the Lodz Film School in 1971. It was released in Poland on January 4, 1972.

=== Home media ===
The film was released for the first time on DVD by Second Run on March 19, 2007.

== Reception ==
=== Critical response ===
Variety said "Zulawski is certainly a man to watch when he marshals and assimilates his influences more thoroughly", and remarked: "the film may try to say a bit too much, and sometimes its allusions remain too personal. But, overall, it has a grim but incisive insight into a time of terror when any order seems illusory and man becomes almost like the lice he works with in the laboratory." Time Out London gave the film a positive review, writing, "Not an easy film to come to terms with because of its cerebral nature and its self-consciousness; [but] a haunting first feature, all the same." Indiewire commented that "rarely does a debut film represent the arrival of an artist with sensibilities so fully formed," and added: "This is no typical war movie, but rather a dreamscape of anxieties and memories, where past experience is likely to be recalled through the sort of dimly-suggested narrative ellipses." Le Monde called it a "half-real, half-dreamed adventure, a stunning phantasm, carried by the lyricism of the violence and the anguish of the places that evoke death, running blood, penetrating fear." Ben Sachs from Chicago Reader awarded the film 4/4 stars. In his review on the film, Sachs wrote, "A sustained nightmare about societal and personal breakdown, it presents one man's descent into madness during the Nazi occupation of Poland, though the story is hard to follow (perhaps by design). Żuławski divulges important information about the characters in short, unexpected bursts, and the plot moves sinuously between the hero's present, past, and dream life. Moreover, the camera is almost always moving hurriedly around the characters, as though the director were having trouble keeping up with his own subjects. These devices can make a viewer feel lost, much as the hero feels in his own experience."

=== Awards ===
The Andrzej Munk Award for Best Debut (Poland, 1971)

Honorary Diploma (Adelaide International Film Festival, Australia, 1972)

The Grand Prize at the Koszalin Film Festival (Poland, 1973)
