= Boris Godunov (1989 film) =

Film by Andrzej Żuławski

- French theatrical release poster
- Directed by: Andrzej Żuławski
- Screenplay by: Andrzej Żuławski
- Based on: Boris Godunov by Modest Mussorgsky Boris Godunov by Alexander Pushkin
- Produced by: Daniel Toscan du Plantier; Claude Abeille
- Starring: Ruggero Raimondi; Kenneth Riegel; Pavel Slaby; Delphine Forest
- Cinematography: Andrzej J. Jaroszewicz; Pierre-Laurent Chénieux
- Edited by: Marie-Sophie Dubus
- Music by: Modest Mussorgsky
- Production companies: Erato Films; La Sept; SGGC; Gemka Productions; Christian Bourgois Productions; Blue Dahlia Productions; Compañía Iberoamericana de TV; Avala Film
- Distributed by: UGC (France)
- Release date: 20 December 1989 (France)
- Running time: 117 minutes
- Countries: France; Spain; Yugoslavia
- Language: Russian

Boris Godunov (French: Boris Godounov) is a 1989 musical drama film written and directed by Andrzej Żuławski, based on the opera of the same name by Modest Mussorgsky and the 1825 play of the same name by Alexander Pushkin.

The film features the 1872 version of Mussorgsky's score, although with significant cuts.

== Plot ==
In 1874 Saint Petersburg, composer Modest Mussorgsky attends the premiere of his opera Boris Godunov. The curtain opens and the performance begins.

After the death of Czar Fyodor an enormous crowd has gathered before the Kremlin gate. Incited by boyars, the crowd implores Boris Godunov to accept the throne. Boris agrees though he knows that the crown is stained with the blood of Czarevitch Dimitri, the rightful heir to the throne, murdered earlier at Godunov's secret order. At the same time, in a monastery, monk Pimen is finishing his historical chronicle. Asked by the young novice Grigori about Dimitri's mysterious death, Pimen reveals to him the truth about Godunov's involvement. Deeply affected by the monk's tale, Grigori soon flees to Lithuania.

At the Kremlin, Godunov feels increasingly lonely as he is haunted by the visions of the murdered Czarevitch. Prince Shuysky informs him that someone who claims to be Czarevitch Dimitri is heading for Moscow to take over the throne. In fact, this is the escaped novice Grigori who has become an impostor in order to win the heart of the Polish beauty Marina Mniszech.

== Cast ==
- Ruggero Raimondi as Boris Godunov
- Delphine Forest/Galina Vishnevskaya as Marina Mnichek
- Pavel Slabý (acting)/Vyacheslav Polozov (singing) as Grigory/Dimitri
- Bernard Lefort/Paul Plishka as Pimène, the hermit
- Pavel Slabý (acting)/Nicolai Gedda as the Innocent
- Kenneth Riegel as Prince Chouisky
- Romuald Tesarowicz as Varlaam, the monk
- National Symphony Orchestra conducted by Mstislav Rostropovich

== Production ==
The film is based on the musical recording of Mussorgsky's opera made in mid-1987 in Washington, D.C., with the participation of several opera stars and the National Symphony Orchestra conducted by Mstislav Rostropovich. The recording was made for Erato Records and cost one million dollars. Producer Daniel Toscan du Plantier invited Andrzej Wajda to do the film version for Erato Films, and when the latter backed out, offered the project to Zulawski. The $7-million production was filmed in Yugoslavia from February to April 1989. Of the original performers, only Ruggero Raimondi, Kenneth Riegel and Romuald Tesarowicz reprised their roles on screen, while the rest of singers was replaced by non-singing actors. Żuławski chose to present the opera as a theatrical performance within the film. However, the director took this approach much further as the camera not only goes through the sets but also regularly exposes the film crew. Żuławski used only less than two hours of the three and a half recorded by Rostropovich, changed the sequence of some scenes and filled the picture with deliberate anachronistic references to the Soviet totalitarian regime.

== Controversy ==
The liberties taken by the director outraged some opera purists and, first of all, the conductor Rostropovich. The latter sued Żuławski demanding to remove certain visual and sound elements from the film. On 10 January 1990, the Paris Court issued a verdict ordering Żuławski to insert an announcement in the beginning of the film, mentioning Rostropovich's disapproval of the film version. However, the court confirmed that the choice of images and sounds should remain the prerogative of the filmmaker, though some used by Żuławski "could denaturate the appreciation of the work interpreted by Rostropovich."

== Reception ==
Variety wrote "as tumultuous as Mussorgsky's great opera is, Żuławski's galloping camera and manic actors more often compete rather than support or illustrate the music and epic drama." Philippe Royer of Positif wrote "the mise-en-scène, constantly intelligent, gives a privilege to the spectacular nature of the story; it regains the beauty of the opera through the poignant and colorful images." Jacques Siclier of Le Monde remarked, "It's impossible to talk here about 'film-opera' in a merely illustrative sense. One should let yourself to be carried by the admirable cinematic work, confirming, as if it was necessary, the Shakespearean temperament of the author of...notable works of the French cinema of the recent years." Phil Powrie of Open Screens called the film "a remarkable achievement, matched only, in my view, by... Jacquot's Tosca."
