= Robert Bierenbaum =

American murderer (born 1955)

Robert Bierenbaum (born July 22, 1955) is an American former plastic surgeon and convicted murderer. He was convicted in October 2000 of having murdered his estranged wife, Gail Katz-Bierenbaum 15 years earlier in their Manhattan apartment on July 7, 1985.

== Murder ==
Robert Bierenbaum, a licensed pilot, took a two-hour flight in a Cessna 172 from Essex County, New Jersey, over the Atlantic Ocean on the day he murdered Gail. He failed to mention this fact to authorities during their initial questioning.

The prosecution stated that Bierenbaum discarded his wife's dismembered body in the ocean. The victim's torso was first thought to be found in 1989 but after exhuming the torso, DNA testing in 1999 proved it was not that of Gail Katz-Bierenbaum. (The torso actually belonged to Heidi Balch, the first victim of serial killer Joel Rifkin, as discovered by the podcast The Girlfriends.) An eyewitness testimony for the defense stated he saw the victim in a Manhattan bagel shop during the time that Bierenbaum took his airplane flight, but was contradictory and didn’t accurately describe the victim’s physical features Bierenbaum was convicted and sentenced to twenty years to life in prison in New York. He appealed, but the conviction was upheld in the New York State Supreme Court, Appellate Division in 2002.

Bierenbaum is currently incarcerated in Sing Sing Correctional Facility. He has been eligible for parole since October 2020. His offender number is 00-A-7114.

At his December 2020 parole hearing, Bierenbaum confessed that he had killed his wife and threw her body out of an airplane.

== Notoriety ==
The Bierenbaum case was the subject of the 2001 New York Times non-fiction bestseller book The Surgeon's Wife. It was the basis of the plot of the episode "The Good Doctor" in the first season of Law and Order: Criminal Intent and also one of the stories in the television show Dominick Dunne: Power, Privilege, & Justice on Court TV.

In the ISBN database, the summary of the book includes:

... Robert Bierenbaum, a prominent surgeon and certified genius ... Gail's parents had been thrilled to learn she was marrying Robert Bierenbaum. He seemed to be the perfect match for their daughter. he was from a well-to-do family, a medical student who spoke five languages fluently, a skier, and he even flew an airplane. ... Robert had tried to choke Gail because he caught her smoking, she filed a police report. She also alleged that he tried to kill her cat because he was jealous of it.

Bierenbaum has been referred to as "The Lady Killer." It has been said in Vanity Fair and New York magazine that women still find him attractive, even though he has been convicted of murdering his first wife.

== Legal precedent ==
People of the State of New York v. Robert Bierenbaum was a landmark decision, setting precedent on upholding physician-patient privilege even when a Tarasoff warning is invoked: "Neither a psychiatrist issuing a Tarasoff warning nor a patient telling his friends he's in treatment constitutes a waiver of a patient's psychiatrist-patient privilege."

The case was also used as precedent in the California case of Glyn Scharf, where Scharf was charged with murdering his wife, even though the victim's body was never found.

== Confession ==
At a parole hearing in December 2020, Bierenbaum confessed to strangling his wife and tossing her body out of an airplane while flying over the Atlantic Ocean. The hearing denied his parole. His next parole hearing was scheduled for November 2021.

== Medical practice status ==
As a result of the New York state Medical Licensing Board's misconduct review following the court case, Bierenbaum surrendered his License to Practice medicine in November, 2000. In September 2002, New Jersey also revoked his medical practice license.

== In popular culture ==
The Robert Bierenbaum case was featured by the television show Law and Order: Criminal Intent, in an episode titled "The Good Doctor," which originally aired in November, 2001; in an episode of the French series Paris enquêtes criminelles; and in an episode of 20/20 in October 2021.

Lisa DePaulo profiled the Bierenbaum case in her story, "Intimations of Murder" published in the September 2000 issue of Vanity Fair magazine. The case was featured in an episode of OWN series Devil You Know.

The podcast The Girlfriends by Carole Fisher and iHeart Podcasts & Novel premiered on July 10, 2023 and covers the Robert Bierenbaum case in season one. It was number one around the world and won the Ambie award for best true crime podcast

In season two, the podcast searches for the identity of the torso that was misidentified as Gail Katz-Bierenbaum for nine years.
