= Leszek Teleszyński =

Polish actor

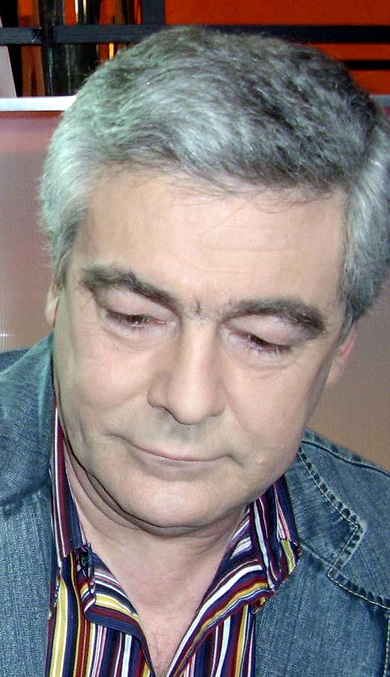
- Born: May 21, 1947 (age 78); Kraków, Poland

Leszek Teleszyński (born May 21, 1947) is a Polish actor. In 1974 he starred in the Academy Award-nominated film The Deluge under Jerzy Hoffman.

== Selected filmography ==
- The Third Part of the Night (1971)
- The Devil (1972)
- The Deluge (1974)
- Leprosy (1976)
- Life on hot (1978)
- Miss Nobody (1996)
- Złotopolscy (1997)
