= L'Amour braque =

1985 French romantic drama film

- Theatrical release poster
- Directed by: Andrzej Żuławski
- Written by: Etienne Roda-Gil; Andrzej Żuławski
- Produced by: Antoine Gannagé; Alain Sarde
- Starring: Sophie Marceau; Francis Huster; Tchéky Karyo
- Cinematography: Jean-François Robin
- Edited by: Marie-Sophie Dubus
- Music by: Stanislas Syrewicz
- Distributed by: AMLF (France)
- Release date: 27 February 1985 (France)
- Running time: 101 minutes
- Country: France
- Language: French
- Box office: $4 million

L'Amour braque (English: Mad Love) is a 1985 French romantic drama film directed by Andrzej Żuławski and starring Sophie Marceau, Francis Huster, and Tchéky Karyo. The film is about a bank robber on his way to Paris who meets a neurotic dreamer whom he considers to be an idiot. The dreamer follows him everywhere and soon falls in love with his girlfriend, resulting in a tragic ending. The film is loosely inspired by Fyodor Dostoevsky's 1869 novel The Idiot. The film received a Fantasporto International Fantasy Film Award Nomination for Best Film in 1986.

== Plot ==
Following a successful bank robbery, Micky (Tchéky Karyo) tries to take back his girlfriend Mary (Sophie Marceau) who had been taken from him by the brothers Venin. On his way to Paris, Micky meets Leon (Francis Huster), a neurotic dreamer who is considered an idiot by Micky and his associates. Uncertain about Micky's actions, Leon follows him everywhere and eventually falls in love with Mary. This strange love triangle leads to a tragic ending.

== Cast ==
- Sophie Marceau as Mary
- Francis Huster as Léon
- Tchéky Karyo as Micky
- Christiane Jean as Aglaé
- Jean-Marc Bory as Simon Venin
- Wladimir Yordanoff as Matalon
- Marie-Christine Adam as Marie's Mother
- Michel Albertini as André
- Saïd Amadis as Le caïd
- Roland Dubillard as Le commissaire
- Ged Marlon as Gilbert Venin
- Serge Spira as Le baron
- Julie Ravix as Gisèle
- Azeddine Bouayad as Harry Cleven
- Pascal Elso

== Production ==
It was the first cinematic collaboration between Sophie Marceau and Andrzej Żuławski, who later made three more films together.

Żuławski cast Marceau after seeing her in Fort Saganne. "I was struck by Sophie's quality of immediate truth," said Żuławski. "It could have been her youth. But when we met, it was obvious that it came from inside her."

"He gets things out of his actors that they never knew were there," said Marceau of the director. "Sometimes it hurts, yet you are changed by it."

== Reception ==
The film was a commercial flop. A contemporary review by Colette Godard for Le Monde describes the film as "a frantic anxiety-driven film whose exploration of hysteria and theatricality ultimately overwhelmed its irony". She praised the performances of Francis Huster and Tchéky Karyo. A retrospective review by Jeremiah Kipp at Slant Magazine describes the film as "taste-bud-blasting stew of high culture and pulp convention".
