= That Most Important Thing: Love =

1975 French film by Andrzej Żuławski

- Directed by: Andrzej Żuławski
- Written by: Christopher Frank; Andrzej Żuławski
- Starring: Romy Schneider; Jacques Dutronc; Fabio Testi; Klaus Kinski
- Music by: Georges Delerue
- Distributed by: S. N. Prodis (France); Seaberg Film Distr. (US) dubbed
- Release date: 12 February 1975
- Running time: 105 mins (cut version); 113 mins (director's cut, NTSC); 108 mins (director's cut, PAL)
- Country: France
- Language: French

That Most Important Thing: Love (original French title: L'Important C'est D'Aimer) is a 1975 French romantic drama film directed by Polish filmmaker Andrzej Żuławski. It tells the story of a passionate love relationship between Nadine Chevalier, a B-List actress (Romy Schneider), and Servais Mont, a photographer (Fabio Testi), in the violent and unforgiving French show business.

After Żuławski's second film, The Devil, was banned in Poland, he decided to move to France, where he made this film in 1975. He coadapted and directed it based on the novel by Christopher Frank La Nuit américaine (unrelated to the 1973 François Truffaut film of that name). The success in France was such – it was featuring the very popular actress Romy Schneider and French singer Jacques Dutronc – that it allowed Żuławski to return to Poland. The film had a total of 1,544,986 admissions in France.

Romy Schneider received the inaugural César Award for Best Actress for this role and Pedro Almodóvar dedicated his film All About My Mother partially to her in this role.

== Plot ==
Servais Mont, a photographer, meets Nadine Chevalier who earns her money starring in cheap soft-core movies. Trying to help her, he borrows the money from loan sharks to finance the theatrical production of Richard III and gives Nadine a part. Nadine is torn between Servais, with whom she is falling in love, and her husband Jacques, to whom she has moral obligations.

== Cast ==
- Romy Schneider as Nadine Chevalier
- Fabio Testi as Servais Mont
- Jacques Dutronc as Jacques Chevalier
- Claude Dauphin as Mazelli
- Roger Blin as Servais's father
- Gabrielle Doulcet as Madame Mazelli
- Michel Robin as Raymond Lapade
- Guy Mairesse as Laurent Messala
- Jacques Boudet as Robert Beninge
- Katia Tchenko as Myriam, the whore
- Nicoletta Machiavelli as Luce, Lapade's wife
- Klaus Kinski as Karl-Heinz Zimmer
- Paul Bisciglia as Assistant director

== U.S. release ==
It was originally released in the U.S. in the 1970s in a dubbed version titled That Most Important Thing: Love. The digitally restored French-language version made its cinematic debut in the U.S. in July 2017.

== Reception ==
On review aggregator Rotten Tomatoes, 92% of 12 critics have given the film a positive review, with an average rating of 8.5/10.

Reviewing the full French version in Film Comment, Ela Bittencourt called it one of Żuławski's best films and a "passionate portrait of the dignity—and the indignities—of an actor's work." She also praised the director's "fluid, roving camera... so attentive to every pang, twinge, or slightest hint of agony that it seems to expose the characters’ every nerve." In a 4/4 star review from Chicago Reader, Ben Sachs said that "shining through L'Important C'Est D'Aimer is a genuine sense that love enables us to transcend the most degrading experiences." The New York Times wrote: "the searing, sometimes confounding film [...] showcases the heartbreaking talents of Schneider." Gene Moskowitz said in Variety: "Accepted in its own terms of an almost symbolical tale of human survival and love, it is an unusual pic served by first rate acting."
