= Andrzej Żuławski =

Polish film director (1940–2016)

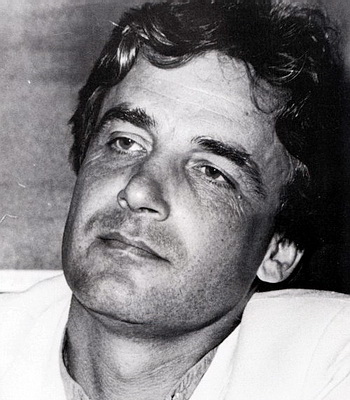
- Żuławski c. late 1980s
- Born: Andrei Miroslavovich Żuławski; 22 November 1940; Lwów, Ukrainian SSR, Soviet Union
- Died: 17 February 2016 (aged 75); Warsaw, Poland
- Citizenship: Poland (Note: Some sources, including the British Film Institute, describe Żuławski as Polish-French, reflecting his long residence and career in France. However, he never applied for French citizenship.)
- Education: Institut des hautes études cinématographiques (IDHEC)
- Occupations: Film director; screenwriter; novelist; essayist; actor
- Years active: 1967–2015
- Spouses: Barbara Baranowska (m. before 1967; div. circa 1970); Małgorzata Braunek (m. 1971; div. 1976): Hanna Wolska (m. after 1976; sep. circa 1983)
- Partner: Sophie Marceau (1985–2001)
- Children: 3, including Xawery
- Relatives: Mirosław Żuławski (father); Jerzy Żuławski (great-uncle)
- Honours: Commander's Cross of the Order of Polonia Restituta Knight of the Order of Arts and Letters Knight of the Legion of Honour

Andrzej Żuławski (Polish: [ˈandʐɛj ʐuˈwafskʲi]; 22 November 1940 – 17 February 2016) was a Polish filmmaker. His films, characterized by extreme emotional and physical intensity, largely rejected mainstream commercialism, polarized critics, and found their primary audience among European art-house viewers. Internationally, he is best known for his 1981 psychological horror film Possession.

Born in Lwów under Soviet occupation, Żuławski was the son of writer and diplomat Mirosław Żuławski and a great-nephew of pioneering science-fiction author Jerzy Żuławski. He studied film in Paris, France during the late 1950s. Returning to Poland, he began his career as an assistant and second-unit director to Andrzej Wajda on films including Samson (1961), a segment of Love at Twenty (1962), and The Ashes (1965). After directing short television films, he made his feature debut with The Third Part of the Night (1971), co-written with his father and a hallucinatory, sensationalized retelling of their experiences during the Nazi occupation. His second feature, the allegorical horror The Devil (1972), was banned by Polish communist authorities for its perceived critique of the regime; Żuławski subsequently left for France.

After the critical and commercial success of the French production That Most Important Thing: Love in 1975, he returned to Poland to adapt his great-uncle's Lunar Trilogy into the ambitious science-fiction epic On the Silver Globe. Authorities shut down production in 1977, when filming was over two-thirds complete; the surviving material was later assembled and released in 1988. Forced back into exile, Żuławski settled primarily in France, where he became known for a series of controversial and violently intense art-house films. These include Possession (1981), The Public Woman (1984), Mad Love (1985), My Nights Are More Beautiful Than Your Days, Boris Godunov (both 1989), and Szamanka (1996).

He frequently collaborated with composer Andrzej Korzyński and actresses Romy Schneider, Isabelle Adjani, and his partner Sophie Marceau, and also wrote several novels during the 1990s and 2000s. After a 15-year hiatus from feature directing, Żuławski returned with Cosmos (2015), which won him the Best Director award at the Locarno Film Festival. Two months after its release, he died at the age of 75.

== Biography ==
=== Early life ===
Andrzej Żuławski was born Andrei Miroslavovich Żuławski (Polish: Andriej Mirosławowicz Żuławski) on 22 November 1940 in Lwów (later Lviv), then in the Ukrainian Soviet Socialist Republic (Ukrainian SSR) of the Soviet Union. He used the name Andrzej, which is the Polish equivalent of Andrei; both are equivalents of the English name Andrew. His mother was named Czesława, and his father, Mirosław Żuławski (1913–1995), was a Polish civil servant (and later diplomat) who had studied and worked in Lwów while it was part of the Second Polish Republic and before its annexation by the Soviet Union in 1939. Through his father, Andrzej was a great-nephew of Jerzy Żuławski (1874–1915), author of the pioneering Polish science-fiction Lunar Trilogy, which Andrzej later adapted into the film On the Silver Globe. Andrzej had younger brothers Łukasz (b. 1947) and Mateusz (b. 1948) and a sister, Marta.

During the German invasion of the Soviet Union in June 1941, while Lwów was under bombardment, Żuławski sustained serious injuries and lost the sight in one eye, while his sister Marta died. In 1945, after his father Mirosław was appointed cultural counselor at the Polish Embassy in Paris, Andrzej spent two years studying in France, where he experienced bullying from his peers. The family relocated to Prague in 1947, and three years later he saw his first film. His grandmother, an enthusiast of pre-war cinema, instilled in him a passion for the medium. In 1956, the family returned to Paris, where Mirosław represented Poland at UNESCO. There, Andrzej attended a bilingual French-Polish lycée and passed his secondary school leaving examination in 1957.

At the age of 17, Żuławski was admitted to the prestigious Paris film school Institut des hautes études cinématographiques (IDHEC), which he completed in 1959. As part of his studies there, he directed his first student short, La Sorcière (1958), an adaptation of Anton Chekhov's short story "The Witch". Toward the end of his time at IDHEC he fell ill with a pulmonary condition. He subsequently studied philosophy at the Sorbonne, though he rejected the existentialist philosophy then dominant there, caustically dismissing it as "Sartrean plagiarisms of Heidegger". A transfer to the University of Warsaw, where Marxist philosophy was taught, proved equally unsatisfying for him.

=== Career ===
Żuławski on the set of his feature directorial debut The Third Part of the Night in 1971.

Thanks to a recommendation from Roman Polanski, he obtained an assistant position with Andrzej Wajda (whose early films he greatly admired) on the production of Samson (1961). Żuławski also assisted Wajda on Love at Twenty (1962) and The Ashes (1965). Shortly afterward, in 1967, he directed two short television films: Pavoncello, based on a story by Stefan Żeromski, and The Song of Triumphant Love, adapted from Ivan Turgenev. Both films survive in color versions, although Polish Television originally broadcast them in black and white.

His debut feature, The Third Part of the Night (1971) was co-written with his father Mirosław and was a sensationalized retelling of their experiences during World War II.

When his second film The Devil was banned in Poland, he decided to move to France, where he made That Most Important Thing: Love (1975) with Romy Schneider.

After returning to Poland he worked for two years on a film which the authorities did not allow him to finish (On the Silver Globe), based on a book by his great-uncle Jerzy. Since then he lived and worked mostly in France, making art films.

Being described as a maverick who always defied mainstream commercialism, Żuławski enjoyed success mostly with the European art-house audiences. His wild, imaginative, and controversial pictures have received awards at various international film festivals. He also wrote several novels, including Il était Un Verger, Lity Bór (a.k.a. La Forêt Forteresse), W Oczach Tygrysa, and Ogród Miłości.

In 2006 he was the Head of the Jury at the 28th Moscow International Film Festival.

Żuławski worked many times with composer Andrzej Korzyński, beginning in The Third Part of the Night (1971). Their last collaboration was for Cosmos (2015), which was also Żuławski's last film.

During his lifetime, Żuławski's films received 64 awards, including two Césars (the French equivalent of the Academy Award). He regarded as his most prized honour an award from the Łódź Film Museum (named Artur), which he kept in his parents' room in Warsaw. He received it for On the Silver Globe.

On 17 February 2016, Żuławski died at a hospital in Warsaw from cancer.

== Personal life ==
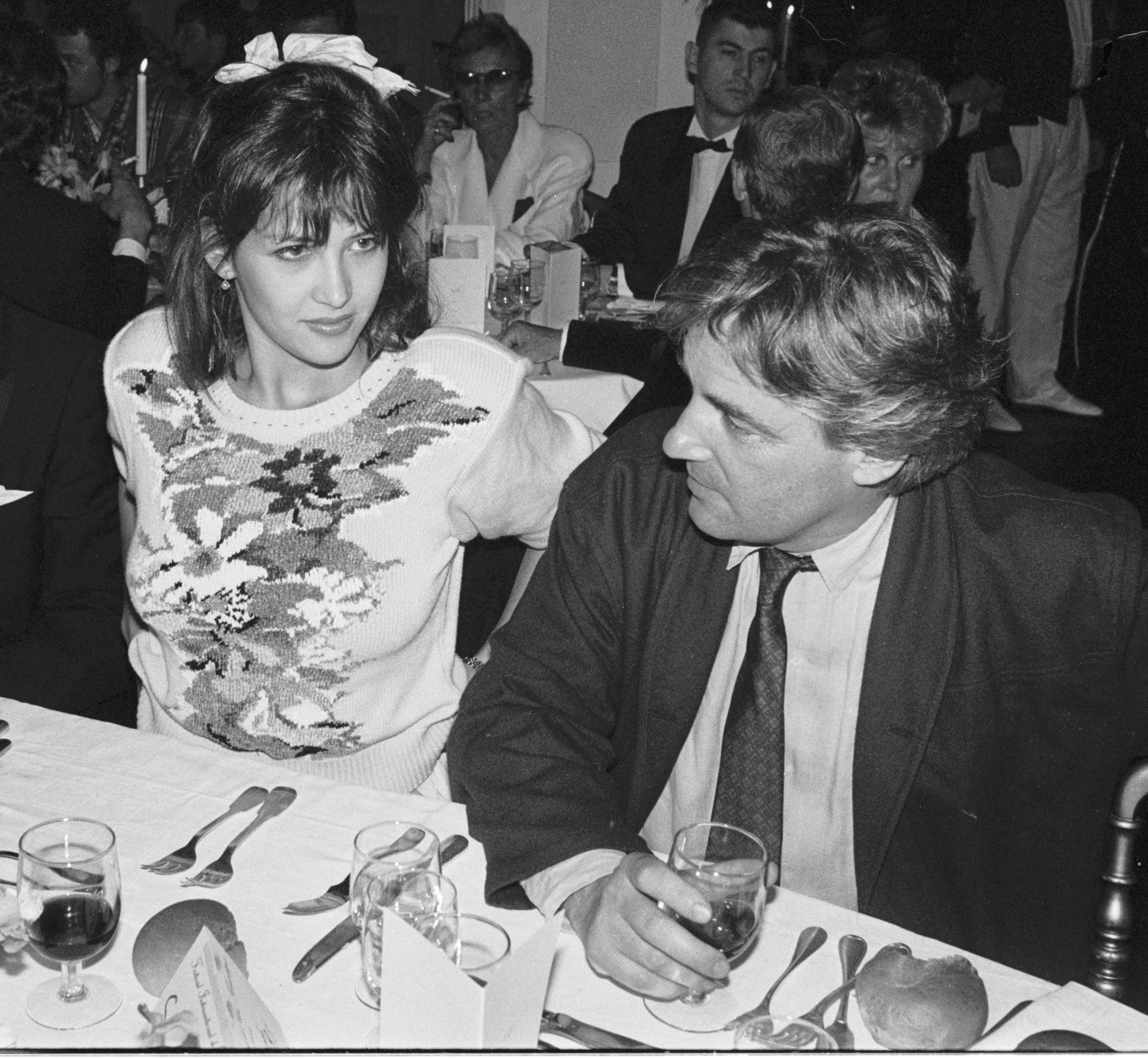
Zulawski with his then-partner Sophie Marceau, 1988

Żuławski's first wife was Barbara Baranowska, a graphic artist associated with the Polish School of Posters. They met in 1962 on the set of Love at Twenty, while she was still married to writer Adolf Rudnicki, and wed in the late 1960s. During the marriage, he had affairs with Joanna Kasperska (lead of his 1967 TV short Pavoncello) and Małgorzata Braunek (met while she was promoting Hunting Flies in 1969 and began during pre-production of his 1971 feature debut The Third Part of the Night). Baranowska then learned of the affairs and filed for divorce. Baranowska later designed the French poster for Żuławski's film Possession (1981); Rudnicki also inspired an unused character in that film.

Żuławski had three sons from different relationships. He married his second wife, Braunek, in 1971 after she divorced actor Janusz Guttner. Their son, Xawery, was born in December that year, and later became a film director. His later relationship with painter Hanna Wolska resulted in the birth of his son Ignacy in 1978; the couple were married sometime after 1976 and separated in the early 1980s after they moved to France with Żuławski's first son Xawery during the time of martial law in Poland (1981–1983). Starting in 1985, he was in a relationship with French actress Sophie Marceau for sixteen years, with whom he made four films (L'Amour braque, My Nights Are More Beautiful Than Your Days, La Note bleue, Fidelity). They had a son named Vincent together. Żuławski and Marceau broke up in 2001. Also during this period, Manuela Gretkowska, who wrote Żuławski's Szamanka (1996), had a roughly two-year affair with him in the 1990s.

From 2007 to 2008, Żuławski dated Weronika Rosati, daughter of Polish politician Dariusz Rosati, who was more than forty years his junior. In 2010, Żuławski released a book titled Nocnik, which included a character allegedly based on Rosati named Esther. Rosati sued Żuławski and the book's publisher for violating her right to privacy and dignity as a woman, as the book included intimate details about her. Żuławski lost the case in 2015.

Żuławski was a cinephile with a lifelong interest in the arts, and he watched a large number of films. In the 2012 Sight & Sound Directors' Poll of the Greatest Films of All Time, he ranked the following ten works: 2001: A Space Odyssey (1968), Amarcord (1973), L'Avventura (1960), The Gold Rush (1925), La Grande Illusion (1937), Hamlet (1948), Sunrise: A Song of Two Humans (1927), Top Hat (1935), Umberto D. (1952), and The Wild Bunch (1969). According to Stephen Thrower, Żuławski also particularly admired The Texas Chain Saw Massacre (1974).

Żuławski remained a Polish citizen throughout his life and was fluent in French and English in addition to his native Polish. Although he spent much of his life living and working in France, and some sources, including the British Film Institute, have occasionally described him as Polish-French, he never applied for French citizenship and did not alter the spelling of his surname. He consistently identified with Poland.

== Legacy ==
Żuławski's work remained polarizing during his lifetime and for years afterward, frequently described as intense, excessive, or "hysterical". French critics coined the term "Żuławskien" to denote over-the-top emotional performances and visual style. His films often defied mainstream commercialism and Polish cinematic norms of the era, including the dominant realist tendencies of the Cinema of Moral Concern, of which he was a severe critic. This stance contributed to censorship, bans, and production interruptions under the communist regime, notably the long ban of The Devil (1972) and the shutdown of On the Silver Globe.

Possession (1981) gained particular notoriety, briefly classified as a "video nasty" in the United Kingdom and developing a cult following for Adjani's performance and its blend of psychological drama, horror, and emotional extremity; it has been compared to the work of David Lynch and David Cronenberg, though with less widespread acceptance at the time.

Posthumous interest in Żuławski's work was reinforced by Cosmos (2015), which won the Best Director prize at Locarno and continued the process of rediscovery begun earlier. RogerEbert.com noted that his rich body of films and novels "has only recently begun to be fully appreciated and rediscovered", with the 1980s efforts remaining "sadly lesser-watched." Paste Magazine observed that even after his death there had been "no concerted effort to make his work more available", with only limited Blu-ray releases for select titles. Sight and Sound reported that in English-speaking countries his reputation "only grew significantly in recent years" through retrospectives and subtitled DVDs, often accompanied by critical "health warnings."

Academic accounts credit the efforts of scholar and collaborator Daniel Bird—through high-quality DVD editions, restorations, commentaries, and retrospectives such as the 2012 BAMcinématek season—with enabling a return from "relative obscurity in the 2000s". In Poland, his films such as Szamanka (1996) have been singled out by critics as among the most underrated domestic works, despite initial scandal and harsh reviews. According to Bird, while Żuławski's uncompromising vision and "peerless" status among Polish filmmakers earned admiration from dedicated followers and festival audiences, mainstream and even specialist recognition lagged for decades due to the combination of aesthetic extremity, political obstacles, and distribution barriers.

== Filmography ==
=== Feature films ===
Year	Title	Original title	Director	Writer	Notes
1971	The Third Part of the Night	Trzecia część nocy	Yes	Yes	
1972	The Devil	Diabel	Yes	Yes	Banned until 1988
1975	That Most Important Thing: Love	L'Important C'est D'Aimer	Yes	Yes	
1981	Possession	—N/a	Yes	Yes	Nominated—Palme d'Or
1984	The Public Woman	La femme publique	Yes	Yes	Nominated—César Award for Best Adaptation
1985	Mad Love	L'Amour braque	Yes	Yes	
1987	Malady of Love	Maladie d'amour	No	Story	
1988	On the Silver Globe	Na srebrnym globie	Yes	Yes	Also narrator
1989	My Nights Are More Beautiful Than Your Days	Mes nuits sont plus belles que vos jours	Yes	Yes	
1989	Boris Godunov	—N/a	Yes	Yes	
1991	Blue Note	La Note bleue	Yes	Yes	
1996	Szamanka	—N/a	Yes	No	
2000	Fidelity	La Fidélité	Yes	Yes	
2015	Cosmos	—N/a	Yes	Yes	
2019	Bird Talk	—N/a	No	Yes	Posthumous

=== Short films and television ===
Year	Title	Director	Writer	Notes
1958	La Sorcière (The Witch)	Yes	Yes	Student short film
	Pavoncello	Yes	Yes	TV short
1969	The Song of Triumphant Love	Yes	Yes	TV movie
1972	Theatre Macabre	Yes	No	TV series; 2 episodes
