= Andrzej Precigs =

Polish actor (1949–2023)

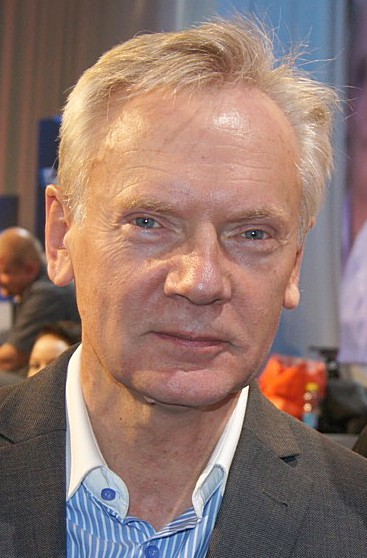
- Precigs in 2012
- Born: Andrzej Cezary Precigs; 22 August 1949; Warsaw, Poland
- Died: 26 August 2023 (aged 74); Warsaw, Poland
- Occupation: Actor

Andrzej Cezary Precigs (22 August 1949 – 26 August 2023) was a Polish theatre, film and voice actor; dubbing director and local politician.

In 1972 he graduated from the Acting Department at the National Film School in Łódź. In the same year he made his debut on the stage of the Ludwik Solski Theatre in Tarnów in "Toruń" by Stefan Żeromski, playing the role of Walek-Walenty. He performed in this theatre until 1974. Then he played in the Stefan Jaracz Theatre in Lodz (1974–1978), 77 Redut Theatre (1978–1980), the Polish Theatre in Warsaw (1981–1982), Targowek Theatre (1982–1987) and the New Theatre in Warsaw (1987–1996). His film debut came in 1971 in the form of a cameo role in the moral comedy 150 per hour. Then he began to perform for numerous television and cinema films. In later years he also became a dubbing director.

In the Polish local elections in 2006, from the list of the Civic Platform (PO) he became a local councilor of Brwinów (later he ran unsuccessfully for mayor). In 2010 he was re-elected. He was also a member of the local authorities division of the PO.

Precigs died on 26 August 2023, at the age of 74.

== Bibliography ==
- Andrzej Precigs on filmweb.pl (pol.)
- Andrzej Precigs on filmpolski.pl (pol.)
- Andrzej Precigs on e-teatr.pl (pol.) (pol.)
