= Hunting Flies (1969 film) =

1969 Polish film

- Film poster
- Directed by: Andrzej Wajda
- Written by: Janusz Głowacki
- Starring: Zygmunt Malanowicz, Małgorzata Braunek
- Cinematography: Zygmunt Samosiuk
- Edited by: Halina Prugar-Ketling
- Production company: Zespoły Filmowe
- Release date: 19 August 1969
- Running time: 104 minutes
- Country: Poland
- Language: Polish

Hunting Flies (Polish: Polowanie na muchy) is a 1969 Polish comedy film directed by Andrzej Wajda. It was entered into the 1969 Cannes Film Festival.

== Plot ==
Włodek is a young man who is stuck in a boring job in a library. He lives in a small apartment with his wife, son and in-laws. His family life is oppressive due to constant nagging by his wife, who wants to move to a bigger apartment. His father-in-law has an obsession with flies. His son is glued to the television set. Włodek's life changes when he meets a young woman, Irena, who fascinates him with her striking appearance and impressive vocabulary. They set off on a short trip together. Their affair is more intellectual than physical. Irena seeks to control Włodek and make him a successful man as imagined by her. Włodek manages to regain control of his life just in time.

== Cast ==
- Zygmunt Malanowicz as Włodek
- Małgorzata Braunek as Irena
- Ewa Skarzanka as Hanka, Włodek's wife
- Hanna Skarzanka as Hanka's mother
- Józef Pieracki as Hanka's father
- Daniel Olbrychski as sculptor
- Irena Dziedzic as journalist
- Leszek Drogosz as militiaman
- Jacek Fedorowicz as director
- Marek Grechuta as V.I.P.'s son
- Irena Laskowska as editor's wife
- Julia Bratna as girl
- M. Ziólkowski as boy
- Leon Bukowiecki as editor
- Krzysztof Burnatowicz

== Reception ==
The film, when released, was well received by some critics, which led to its being shortlisted for the Palme d'Or at Cannes. However, the portrayal of women in the film came in for adverse comments. One critic remarked: "the film's stale misogyny doesn't reflect well on [Wajda] ..." Accepting the criticism, Andrzej Wajda wrote later: "I willingly accepted Janusz Glowacki's film script without giving it much thought. Driven by frustration of temporary personal misadventures, I decided to settle the score with women who try to control men's lives. ... Unfortunately, my faculties were dimmed by my temporary disgust with women ... I lacked clear judgement and had to pay for it. ... what resulted was a fairly colourless film."

Hunting Flies has attracted critical attention as a film which is atypical of Wajda's work. As a 2016 reviewer writes: "With Hunting Flies Andrzej Wajda clearly deviated from his usual style and gave us a satiric bitter-sweet picture of young adults being trapped in various social deals, family issues, class system (still visible) – just like eponymous flies stuck to a flypaper."
