= Paris enquêtes criminelles =

- Created by: Dick Wolf
- Based on: Law & Order: Criminal Intent
- Starring: Vincent Pérez; Audrey Looten; Laura Killing
- Country of origin: France
- No. of seasons: 3
- No. of episodes: 20

Production
- Running time: approx. 55 minutes (per episode)

Original release
- Network: TF1
- Release: May 3, 2007 – November 8, 2008

Related
- Law & Order: Criminal Intent

Paris enquêtes criminelles (English: "Paris Criminal Investigations") is a French television series that is a foreign adaptation of Dick Wolf's Law & Order: Criminal Intent. It was broadcast in 3 seasons, between May 3, 2007 to November 8, 2008 via TF1.

== Synopsis ==
Adapted from Law & Order: Criminal Intent (French: New York section criminelle), it follows the investigations of two police detectives with very different methods of investigation. Vincent Revel (Vincent Pérez) is very intuitive, while his partner, Claire Savigny (Sandrine Rigaux), is more logical. The first season's episodes were adapted from episodes of the first season of Criminal Intent. This French adaptation of the Law & Order franchise is the only one not to use the voice-over introduction and the title cards between scene changes. Both the other international versions (Russian and British) use these icons.

The show was renewed for a third season, which began broadcasting on November 6, 2008. Claire Savigny was replaced by Mélanie Rousseau, played by Audrey Looten.

== Cast ==
The cast of Paris enquêtes criminelles; from left, Laure Killing, Vincent Pérez, Sandrine Rigaux, and Jacques Pater.

- Vincent Pérez as Commander Vincent Revel (Season 1 – Season 3)
- Sandrine Rigaux as Lieutenant Claire Savigny (Season 1)
- Jacques Pater as Police Chief Bonnefoy (Season 1)
- Hélène Godec as Judge Frances Lherbier (Season 1)
- Laure Killing as Judge Fontana (Season 1 – Season 3)
- Audrey Looten as Mélanie Rousseau (Season 2 – Season 3)

=== Guest ===
- Anne Charrier as Catherine
- Aurélien Recoing as Father Roche
- Émilie Gavois-Kahn as Judith
- Patrick d'Assumçao as The locksmith

== Episodes ==
=== Season 1 ===
#	Title	Law & Order: Criminal Intent Equivalent
1.1	"Fantôme"	"Phantom" (1.16)
1.2	"Requiem pour un assassin"	"The Faithful" (1.4)
1.3	"Le Serment"	"One" (1.1)
1.4	"Addiction"	"Smothered" (1.3)
1.5	"Homme au scalpel"	"The Good Doctor" (1.9)
1.6	"L'Ange de la mort"	"Poison" (1.7)
1.7	"Un homme de trop"	"The Extra Man" (1.6)
1.8	"Le Justicier de l'ombre"	"The Third Horseman" (1.11)

=== Season 2 ===
#	Title	Law & Order: Criminal Intent Equivalent
2.1	"Blessure secrète"	"Homo Homini Lupis" (1.14)
2.2	"Rédemption"	"Monster" (2.15)
2.3	"Suite funéraire"	"Suite Sorrow" (2.12)
2.4	"Complot"	"Best Defense" (2.4)
2.5	"Un cri dans la nuit"	"Yesterday" (1.18)
2.6	"L'amour fou"	"Crazy" (1.12)

=== Season 3 ===
#	Title	Law & Order: Criminal Intent Equivalent
3.1	"La grande vie"	"The Insider" (1.13)
3.2	"La quête"	"Undaunted Mettle" (3.01)
3.3	"Un crime d'amour"	"Bright Boy" (2.02)
3.4	"Visions"	"See Me" (2.13)
3.5	"Comme un frère"	"Consumed" (3.21)
3.6	"Trafics"	"Baggage" (2.11)

== DVD releases ==
Season	Release date	Notes
1	September 6, 2007	Also contains a 20-minute "making of"
2	January 8, 2009	
