= Małgorzata Braunek =

Polish actress (1947–2014)

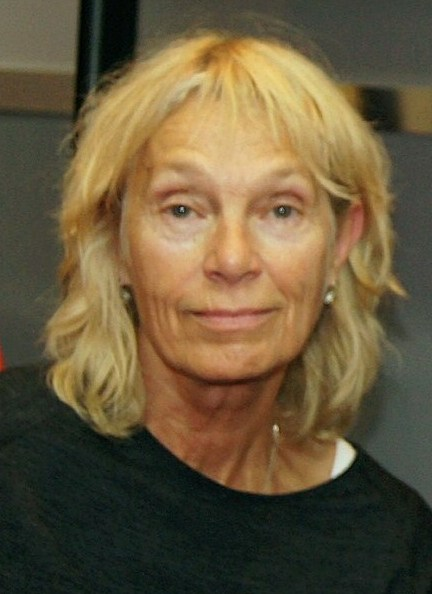
- Braunek in 2012
- Born: 30 January 1947; Szamotuły, Poland
- Died: 23 June 2014 (aged 67); Warsaw, Poland
- Occupation: Actress
- Years active: 1966–2014
- Spouses: Janusz Guttner (div. 1971) Andrzej Żuławski (m. 1971; div. 1976) Andrzej Krajewski (after 1976)
- Children: 2, including Xawery Żuławski

Małgorzata Braunek (30 January 1947 – 23 June 2014) was a Polish film and stage actress.

== Early life ==
Małgorzata Braunek was born in Szamotuły. She studied acting department at National Higher School of Theatre in Warsaw until 1969, when she dropped out from to start her film career.

== Personal life ==
She was married three times: first briefly to actor Janusz Guttner, whom she divorced in 1971; then to director Andrzej Żuławski from 1971 to 1976, with whom she had a son, Xawery; and lastly to Andrzej Krajewski until her death, with whom she had a daughter, Orina (born in 1987). She was also a long-time practitioner and teacher of Zen Buddhism receiving Dharma transmission from Dennis Merzel at Kanzeon Sangha (Warsaw) in 2003.

== Death ==
On 23 June 2014, Braunek died from complications from ovarian cancer in Warsaw, aged 67. She was buried at Evangelical-Augsburg Cemetery, beside her mother, on 5 July 2014.

== Partial filmography ==
- Przechodnie (1966)
- The Leap (1967) as Teresa
- Wycieczka w nieznane (1968)
- Matthew's Days (1968) as Anna
- The Game (1968)
- Shifting Sands (1968)
- Ruchome piaski (1969) as Girl
- Gra (1969)
- Hunting Flies (1969) as Irena
- Skok (1969)
- Wniebowstąpienie (1969) as Raisa
- W każdą pogodę (1969)
- Landscape After the Battle (1970) as Niemka na rowerze
- Oxygen (1970) as Patricija
- Lokis: Rękopis profesora Wittembacha (aka The Bear) (1970) as Julia Dowgiełło
- The Third Part of the Night (1971) as Marta
- The Devil (1972) as Narzeczona Jakuba / Jakub's fiancée
- The Deluge (original title: Potop) (1974) as Oleńka Billewiczówna
- Wielki układ (1976) as Marta Nowicka
- The Shadow Line (1976)
- Lalka (1977) as Izabella Łęcka
- Jörg Ratgeb – Painter (1978) as Junge Bäurin
- Tercet egzotyczny a może erotyczny? (1978)
- Wejście w nurt (1978, TV Movie) as Małgorzata
- Dr Seneki (1980)
- The Big Night Bathe (1980) as Żana
- ...według Christiana Skrzyposzka (1996) as herself
- Darmozjad polski (1998) as a tourist
- Ktoś pamięta moje imię (1998) (voice)
- Glina (2003–2004, TV Series) as Tatiana Zubrzycka
- Tulips (2004) as Marianna
- Bulionerzy (2004–2006) as Marta Berger
- Pełną parą (2005, TV Series) as Bogusia Lamarti
- Pensjonat pod Różą (2005, TV Series) as Wiesława Pasternak
- Z miłosci (2007) as Matka Róży
