= Xawery Żuławski =

Polish film director (born 1971)

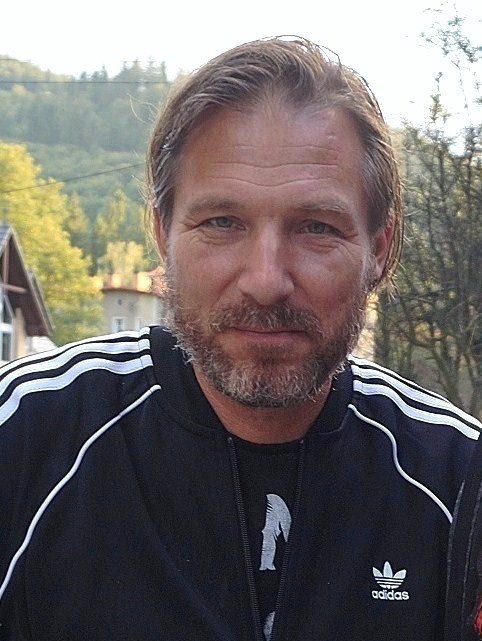
- Born: 22 December 1971 (age 54); Warsaw, Poland
- Education: National Film School in Łódź
- Years active: 1995–present
- Spouse: Maria Strzelecka
- Children: 2
- Parent(s): Andrzej Żuławski; Małgorzata Braunek

Xawery Żuławski (born 22 December 1971 in Warsaw) is a Polish film director.

In 1995, he graduated National Film School in Łódź. He is the son of actress Małgorzata Braunek and director Andrzej Żuławski. His second feature Wojna polsko-ruska (2009), adapted from the controversial best-selling novel by Dorota Masłowska, won First Prize in the New Polish Films competition at the 9th Era New Horizons Film Festival in Wrocław.

== Filmography ==
=== Director ===
- Wiadomość od Jimiego (1993)
- Europe 99euro-films2 (segment "King of the Dwarfs") (2003)
- Chaos (2006)
- Wojna polsko-ruska (2009), based on a novel by Dorota Masłowska
- Diagnoza (2017), TV series
- Mowa ptaków (2019), based on a screenplay by his father
- Odwilż (2022), TV series
- Kulej. Two Sides of the Medal (2024)

=== Screenplay ===
- Wiadomość od Jimiego (1993)
- Europe 99euro-films2 (2003)
- Chaos (2006)
- Wojna polsko-ruska (2009), based on a novel by Dorota Masłowska

=== Actor ===
- La Fidélité, as Coureur Speedway (2000)
- Portret podwójny, as Żurek (2000)
- Bellissima (2001)
- Absolute Beginners (2023)
