= The Devil (1972 film) =

- 1988 theatrical release poster
- Directed by: Andrzej Żuławski
- Written by: Andrzej Żuławski
- Starring: Małgorzata Braunek; Leszek Teleszyński; Wojciech Pszoniak
- Cinematography: Maciej Kijowski
- Edited by: Krzysztof Osiecki
- Music by: Andrzej Korzynski
- Production company: Zespól Filmowy "X"
- Distributed by: Przedsiębiorstwo Dystrybucji Filmów
- Release dates: 1972; March 1988
- Running time: 119 minutes
- Country: Poland
- Language: Polish

The Devil (Polish: Diabeł) is a 1972 Polish historical horror film written and directed by Andrzej Żuławski. It was banned by the Communist government in Poland until 1987.

== Plot ==
The film begins shortly after the Second Partition of Poland in 1793, as Prussian troops enter Greater Poland. A mysterious Stranger dressed in black enters a prison where Jakub is being held for his involvement in a conspiracy to assassinate the Prussian king. Amid a bloody riot, the Stranger frees Jakub, instructs him to return home, and sends a white-clad nun to accompany him. The Stranger continues to follow Jakub throughout his journey, while the increasingly horrified nun witnesses the violence and depravity surrounding them.

On the road, Jakub encounters a hedonistic troupe of actors who repeatedly attempt to seduce him. He learns that his best friend and fellow conspirator, having told Jakub’s pregnant fiancée that Jakub was dead, has married her and apparently entered the king’s service. Returning home, Jakub discovers that his father has committed suicide and his sister has become mentally unstable. The household is controlled by Jakub’s half-brother, who ridicules Jakub’s political cause, abuses his sister, and intends to marry her.

Jakub also discovers that his estranged mother, who abandoned him and his sister as children, has been living nearby and operating a brothel. He confronts her there, but she initially fails to recognize him, and the two nearly have sex. Overcome with rage, Jakub attacks a prostitute and slits her throat with a straight razor given to him by the Stranger.

Horrified by what he has done, Jakub seeks comfort from the nun, but she rejects him. His mental state deteriorates, and he returns to his former friend’s estate in an attempt to reclaim his fiancée. His friend beats and then kisses him. Jakub is subsequently found by the acting troupe and seduced by one of its actresses. During sex, another actor attacks them out of jealousy, and Jakub kills both the actor and the actress. The remaining troupe pursues him. Their male leader offers to conceal Jakub from the authorities in exchange for sex and eventually attempts to rape him, but the Stranger intervenes and kills the man.

Jakub and the nun travel to a place where Jakub played as a child and find his former fiancée there. She says she wishes to flee with him, but dies from complications of her pregnancy despite Jakub’s pleas for the nun to save her. The Stranger then directs Jakub back to his mother’s brothel.

Now recognizing her son, Jakub’s mother embraces him and takes him into the cellar, where its patrons are engaged in various acts of debauchery. She offers Jakub a place there as a prostitute and tells him that the patrons would celebrate even his murders. She also claims that the Stranger is merely a low-ranking government official. Having accepted the Stranger’s earlier insistence that he has been chosen to cleanse the corrupt world around him, Jakub kills his mother and drives the patrons from the brothel. He then returns home, kills his half-brother, kills his badly abused sister as an act of mercy, and burns down the family house.

Jakub next returns to his former friend’s estate and kills him in a duel. The nun helps the delirious Jakub escape into the woods, where they again encounter the Stranger. The Stranger demands that Jakub sign a document naming his relatives and former associates as conspirators against the king and crediting the Stranger with exposing the conspiracy. He explains that he deliberately forced Jakub to confront the corruption and betrayals of those around him so that Jakub would ultimately denounce them.

Jakub agrees to sign the document only after asking whether there is any beauty in the world or whether everything is corrupt. The Stranger answers that the world is beautiful and expresses his belief through a dance. Once Jakub signs the document, the Stranger shoots him in the head and leaves with the nun.

The Stranger delivers Jakub’s signed confession to a group of Prussian soldiers. They pay him for his services but condemn his methods as immoral and mock his efforts to corrupt Jakub. Enraged but powerless against them, the Stranger attacks the nun and attempts to rape her. During the assault, she seizes the straight razor he had earlier given Jakub and castrates him. The Stranger undergoes a transformation into a wolf and dies from his wounds. The film ends with the nun standing over his animal corpse.

== Cast ==
- Wojciech Pszoniak as The Stranger/Devil
- Leszek Teleszyński as Jakub
- Małgorzata Braunek as Jakub's fiancée
- Iga Mayr as mother of Jakub
- Wiktor Sadecki as Herz, director of circus
- Michal Grudzinski as Ezechiel, brother of Jakub
- Maciej Englert as Count
- Monika Niemczyk as The Nun

== Release ==
=== Home media ===
The film was released on DVD by Polart on October 23, 2007.

== Reception ==
Sean Leonard from HorrorNews.net gave the film a mostly positive review, commending the film's cinematography, and acting, while also noting that the film didn't make a ton of sense. Jeremiah Kipp from Slant Magazine offered the film similar praise, writing, "Society for Zulawski is just a thin veneer used to disguise the horrible sadism and unhappiness lurking inside every human heart. The Devil would make for maudlin, depressing viewing if every scene didn’t feel like explosions were being set off, sending the inmates of a madhouse free into the streets outside."

The film has served as an inspiration for the 2024 film Nosferatu.
