= Andrzej Korzyński =

Polish composer (1940–2022)

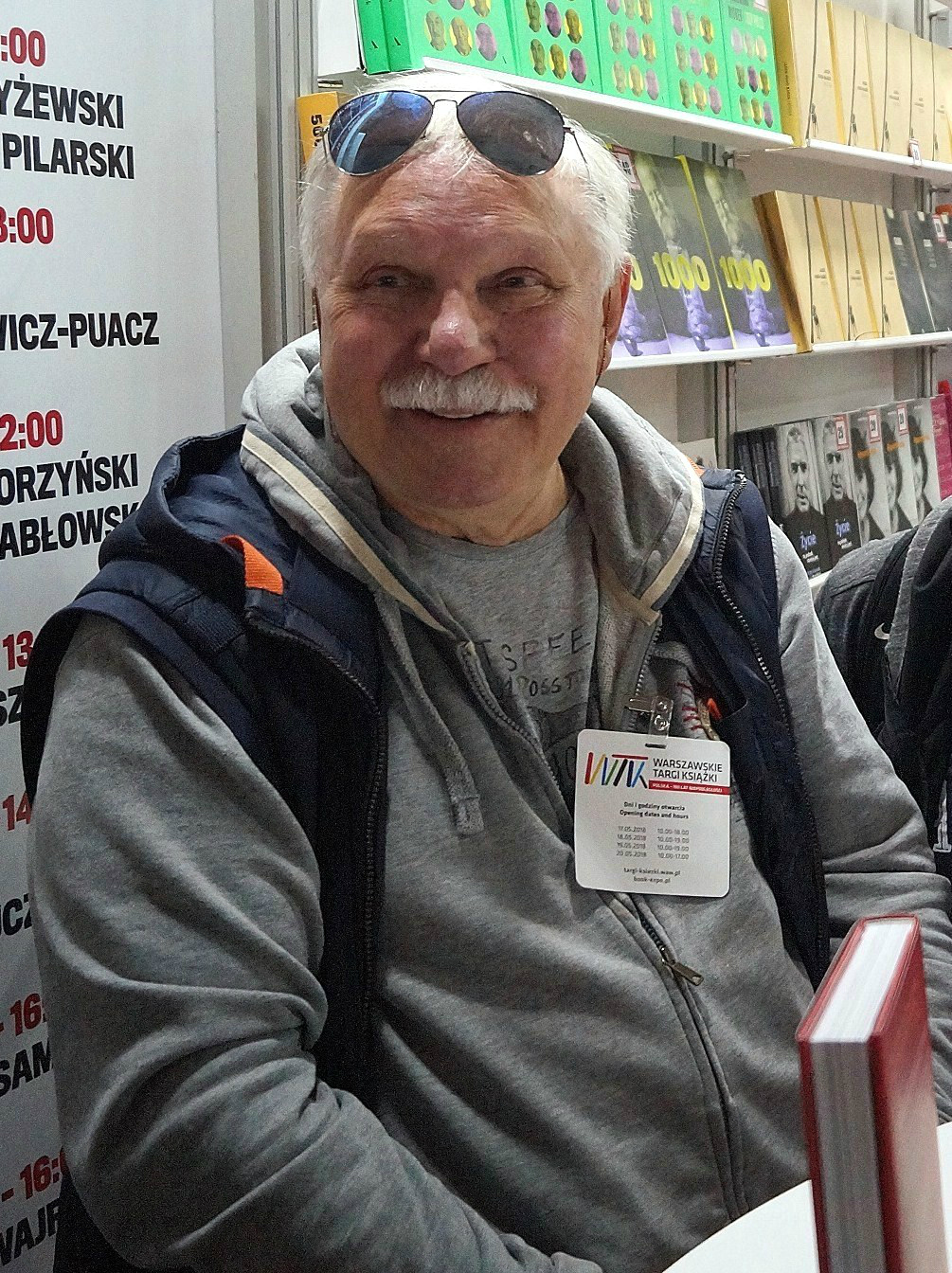
- Korzyński in 2018
- Born: Andrzej Waldemar Korzyński; March 2, 1940; Warsaw, Poland
- Died: April 18, 2022 (aged 82); Warsaw, Poland
- Other name: "Andrzej Spol"
- Occupations: Composer; arranger; pianist; lyricist
- Years active: 1964–2019
- Spouse: Sylwia Hanna Sokorska-Korzyńska (died 2023)
- Children: Mikołaj Korzyński
- Relatives: Włodzimierz Sokorski (father-in-law)

Andrzej Waldemar Korzyński (also known by the pseudonym Andrzej Spol; 2 March 1940 – 18 April 2022) was a Polish composer, arranger, and pianist. A pioneer of Polish electronic music and big beat, he co-founded the Rytm Youth Studio at Polskie Radio and became one of the country's most prolific creators of popular songs and film scores.

He composed music for more than 150 films and television series, and wrote enduring hits performed by artists including Piotr Szczepanik, Maryla Rodowicz, Irena Jarocka, and Czesław Niemen. He also created the disco parody character Franek Kimono in 1983, and the music for the popular Mr. Kleks (Pan Kleks) film trilogy based on Jan Brzechwa's books. His other work ranged from some of the biggest hits from the 1960s to the early 1990s, a popular children's musical (Akademia Pana Kleksa) and scores for what are considered some of the best Polish films of the second half of the 20th century — including Andrzej Wajda's (The Birch Wood, Man of Marble) and Andrzej Żuławski's (The Devil, On the Silver Globe, Possession).

Korzyński was born in Warsaw, Korzyński graduated from the Fryderyk Chopin University of Music in 1964; he began his career in music later that same year. He was a member of the Polish Film Academy.
