= 1903 in literature =

This article contains information about the literary events and publications of 1903.

== Events ==
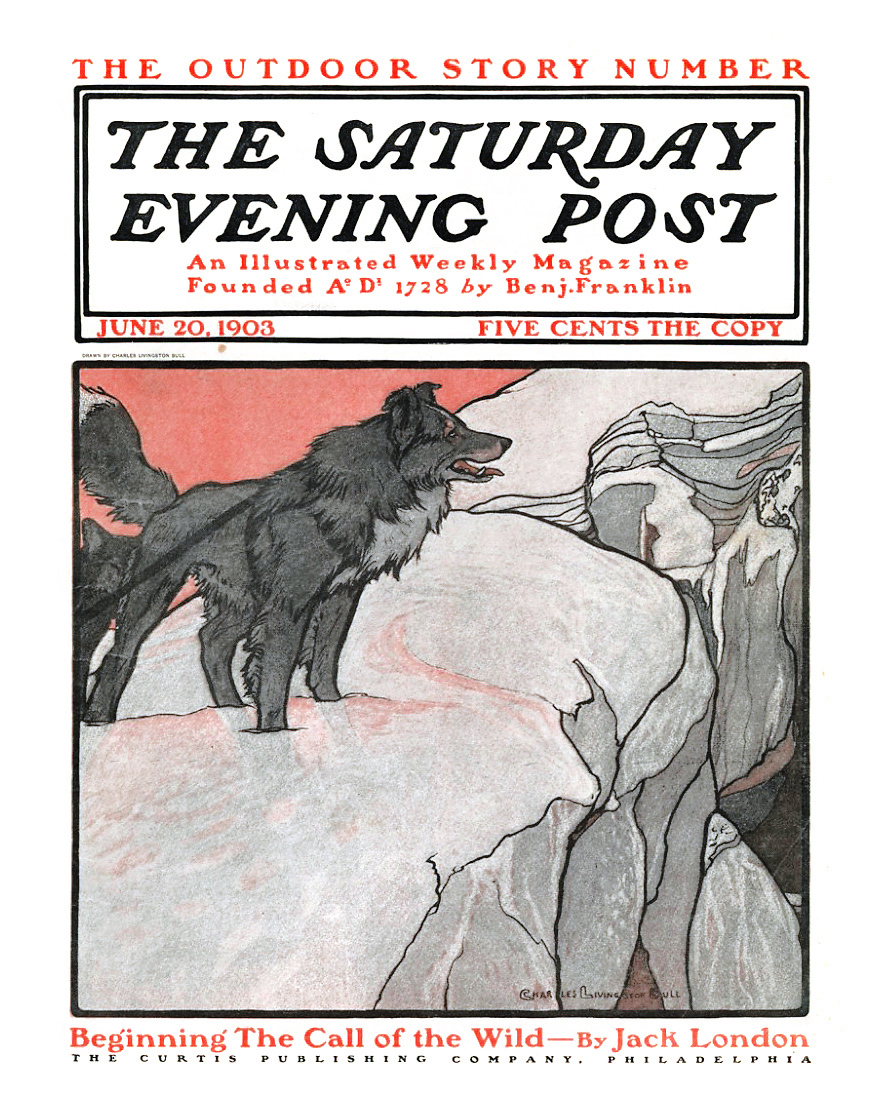
Cover of the Saturday Evening Post advertising The Call of the Wild, first episode

- January–December – Henry James's novel The Ambassadors is published as a serial in the monthly North American Review.
- May 22 – Japanese philosophy student Misao Fujimura (藤村操, born 1886) carves a poem into a tree at Kegon Falls before committing suicide over unrequited love.
- June 20 – Jack London's novel The Call of the Wild begins serial publication in the Saturday Evening Post.
- October 24 – Mark Twain sets out for Florence (Italy).
- December – The Prix Goncourt for French literature is awarded for the first time, to John Antoine Nau for his novel Force ennemie.
- December 16 – The London County Council erects a plaque to novelist Charles Dickens (d. 1870) on his former home in Doughty Street.
- December 19 – The first of G. K. Chesterton's short stories in the series The Club of Queer Trades, "The Tremendous Adventures of Major Brown", appears in Harper's Weekly.
- unknown date – William Foyle and his brother Gilbert establish the London bookselling business of Foyles.

== New books ==
=== Fiction ===
- Pío Baroja – El Mayorazgo de Labraz (Lord of Labraz, second of La Tierra Vasca – The Basque Country trilogy, 1900–1909)
- Ioan A. Bassarabescu – Nuvele
- Thio Tjin Boen – Tjerita Oeij Se
- René Boylesve – Enfant à la Balustrade
- Samuel Butler (died 1902) – The Way of All Flesh
- Erskine Childers – The Riddle of the Sands
- Joseph Conrad – Typhoon and Other Stories (U. K. book publication)
- Joseph Conrad and Ford Madox Hueffer – Romance
- Florence Converse – Long Will
- Grazia Deledda – Elias Portolu
- Isabelle Eberhardt – Trimardeur (serialization begins)
- John Fox, Jr. – The Little Shepherd of Kingdom Come
- Mary E. Wilkins Freeman – The Wind in the Rose Bush
- George Gissing – The Private Papers of Henry Ryecroft
- Henry James – The Ambassadors
- Jack London – The Call of the Wild
- John Antoine Nau – Force ennemie
- Frank Norris (died 1902) – The Pit
- Marmaduke Pickthall – Said the Fisherman
- Bram Stoker – The Jewel of Seven Stars
- Jules Verne – Travel Scholarships (Bourses de voyage)
- Mary Augusta Ward – Lady Rose's Daughter
- Émile Zola – Vérité
- Jerzy Żuławski – Na Srebrnym Globie (On the Silver Globe, first in the Trylogia Księżycowa – Lunar Trilogy)

=== Children and young people ===
- L. Frank Baum – The Enchanted Island of Yew
- Beatrix Potter
  - The Tale of Squirrel Nutkin
  - The Tailor of Gloucester
- Herminie Templeton – Darby O'Gill and the Good People (book publication)
- Kate Douglas Wiggin – Rebecca of Sunnybrook Farm

=== Drama ===
- Dusé Mohamed Ali – The Jew's Revenge
- Jacinto Benavente – La noche del sábado (Saturday Night)
- Haralamb Lecca – Cancer la inimă
- André de Lorde – Le Système du docteur Goudron et du professeur Plume
- W. Somerset Maugham – A Man of Honour
- René Morax – La Dîme
- Ștefan Petică – Frații
- Florencio Sánchez – M'hijo el dotor (My son, the doctor)
- George Bernard Shaw – Man and Superman (published)
- J. M. Synge – In the Shadow of the Glen
- Pierre Wolff – The Secret of Polichinelle (Le Secret de Polichinelle)
- Stanisław Wyspiański – Wyzwolenie (Liberation)

=== Poetry ===
- Giovanni Pascoli – Canti di Castelvecchio
- Thomas Traherne (died 1674) – Poetical Works
- W. B. Yeats – In the Seven Woods, being poems of the Irish heroic age

=== Non-fiction ===
- James Allen – As a Man Thinketh
- Ada Cambridge – Thirty Years in Australia
- E. K. Chambers – The Mediaeval Stage
- W. E. B. Du Bois – The Souls of Black Folk
- Helena Rutherfurd Ely – A Woman's Hardy Garden
- Auguste Escoffier – Le Guide culinaire
- Helen Keller – The Story of My Life (book publication)
- G. E. Moore – Principia Ethica
- John Morley – The Life of Gladstone
- Alois Riegl – Der moderne Denkmalkultus, sein Wesen, seine Entstehung (The Modern Cult of Monuments, Its Character and Origin)
- W. B. Yeats – Ideas of Good and Evil (essays)

== Births ==
- January 10 – E. Arnot Robertson, English novelist and broadcaster (died 1961)
- February 11 – Alan Paton, South African novelist and activist (died 1988)
- February 13 – Georges Simenon, Belgian crime writer (died 1989)
- February 17 – Sadegh Hedayat, Iranian-born novelist (suicide 1951)
- February 21
  - Anaïs Nin, French-American novelist and diarist (died 1977)
  - Raymond Queneau, French poet (died 1976)
- February 22 – Morley Callaghan, Canadian writer (died 1990)
- February 24
  - Vladimir Bartol, Slovene author (died 1967)
  - Irène Némirovsky, Russian-born French novelist (died 1942)
- June 8 – Marguerite Yourcenar, Belgian novelist (died 1987)
- June 18 – Raymond Radiguet, French author (died 1923)
- June 25 – George Orwell, English novelist and journalist (died 1950)
- July 3 – Oliver Stonor, English novelist (died 1987)
- July 10 – John Wyndham, English science fiction writer (died 1969)
- September 5 – János Kemény, American-born Transylvanian Hungarian writer (died 1971)
- September 9 – Edward Upward, English novelist and short story writer (died 2009)
- September 10 – Cyril Connolly, English critic and writer (died 1974)
- September 14 – Mart Raud, Estonian poet, playwright and writer (died 1980)
- October 17
  - G. E. Trevelyan, English novelist (died 1941)
  - Nathanael West, American novelist and screenwriter (died 1940)
- October 28 – Evelyn Waugh, English novelist and critic (died 1966)
- December 6 (November 23 OS) – Gaito Gazdanov, Russian-born novelist (died 1971)
- December 10
  - Mary Norton, English children's writer (died 1992)
  - William Plomer (Robert Pagan), South African-born novelist, poet, literary editor and librettist (died 1973)
- December 13 – Todhunter Ballard, American novelist (died 1980)
- December 24 – Nancy Brysson Morrison, Scottish novelist (died 1986)
- December 29 – Sergiu Dan, Romanian novelist and journalist (died 1976)
- Uncertain date – Kathleen Lindsay, prolific English-born romance novelist (died 1973)

== Deaths ==
- January 22 – Augustus Hare, English biographer and travel writer (born 1834)
- February 8 – Ada Ellen Bayly, English novelist (born 1857)
- March 4 – Joseph Henry Shorthouse, English novelist (born 1834)
- March 6 – Gaston Paris, French literary critic and scholar (born 1839)
- March 8 – Josefina Wettergrund, Swedish writer (born 1830)
- March 9 – Minnie Mary Lee, American author of poems, stories, sketches and novels (born 1825)
- March 14 – Ernest Legouvé, French dramatist (born 1807)
- April 28 — Frances Augusta Conant, American journalist (born 1841)
- April 29 – Paul Du Chaillu, French American travel writer (born c. 1831)
- May 12 – Richard Henry Stoddard, American critic and poet (born 1825)
- May 24 – Max O'Rell (Léon Paul Blouet), French journalist (born 1847)
- June 12 – Claymoor, Romanian fashion and entertainment critic (peptic ulcer; born c. 1842)
- July 11 – W. E. Henley, English poet (tuberculosis, born 1847)
- August 31 – William Hastie, Scottish theologian (born 1842)
- September 1 – Charles Bernard Renouvier, French philosopher (born 1815)
- October 4 – Otto Weininger, Austrian philosopher (suicide, born 1880)
- November 1 – Theodor Mommsen, German classical scholar and historian (born 1817)
- November 11 — Lavilla Esther Allen, American author (born 1834)
- November 19 – Hugh Stowell Scott (Henry Seton Merriman), English novelist (born 1862)
- December 28 – George Gissing, English novelist (emphysema, born 1857)

== Awards ==
- Prix Goncourt: John Antoine Nau for Force ennemie
- Nobel Prize for Literature: Bjørnstjerne Bjørnson
