= Żuławski =

Żuławski (feminine: Żuławska; plural: Żuławscy) is a Polish surname. Notable people with the surname include:

- Andrzej Żuławski (1940–2016), Polish film director, the father of Xawery Żuławski
- Iwona Woicka-Żuławska (born 1972), Polish diplomat
- Jacek Żuławski (1907–1976), Polish painter
- Jerzy Żuławski (1874–1915), Polish writer
- Juliusz Żuławski (1910–1999), Polish writer
- Kazimiera Żuławska (1883–1971), Polish translator and activist
- Marek Żuławski (1908–1985), Polish painter and graphic artist
- Mirosław Żuławski (1913–1995), Polish writer and diplomatist
- Wawrzyniec Jerzy Żuławski (1916–1957), Polish alpinist, composer and writer
- Xawery Żuławski (born 1971), Polish film director, the son of Andrzej Żuławski
- Zygmunt Żuławski (1880–1949), Polish politician and activist

== See also ==
- Jerzy Żuławski family tree
