= 1834 in literature =

This article contains information about the literary events and publications of 1834.

== Events ==
The Last Day of Pompeii, Karl Bryullov

- April – W. Harrison Ainsworth's first novel, the historical romance Rookwood, is published anonymously in London by Richard Bentley, with illustrations by George Cruikshank. Romanticising the highwayman Dick Turpin, it succeeds enough for the author to take up full-time writing. Bentley also publishes Edward Bulwer-Lytton's anonymous popular novel The Last Days of Pompeii in the same year. The novel was inspired by the painting The Last Day of Pompeii by the Russian painter Karl Bryullov, which Bulwer-Lytton had seen in Milan.
- June 10 – The Scottish philosopher and writer Thomas Carlyle and his wife Jane move to Cheyne Row (Carlyle's House) in London. The house was located near the residence of Carlyle's friend Leigh Hunt in Chelsea. The Carlyles' new house became central to Victorian intellectual life, a place of pilgrimage for literati, scientists, clergymen and political figures from all over Europe and North America. Carlyle did most of his writing there from The French Revolution: A History (1837) onward.
- August – Charles Dickens first uses the pen name Boz, in the second installment of "The Boarding-House", one of the Sketches by Boz, originally published in the Monthly Magazine (London). Dickens took the pseudonym from a nickname which he had given his younger brother Augustus, whom he called "Moses" after a character in Oliver Goldsmith's The Vicar of Wakefield. This, "being facetiously pronounced through the nose," became "Boses", which in turn was shortened to "Boz". The name remained coupled with "inimitable" until "Boz" eventually disappeared and Dickens became known as, simply, "The Inimitable". The name was originally pronounced /ˈboʊz/ but is now usually /ˈbɒz/.
- November 24 – George Sand begins her journal addressed to Alfred de Musset.
- unknown date – Carl Jonas Love Almqvist's fourth novel in the "Törnrosens bok" series, The Queen's Tiara (Drottningens juvelsmycke) is published anonymously. Set around the assassination of King Gustav III of Sweden in 1792, it is the first original historical novel written in Sweden, and features a bisexual character, Tintomara.

== New books ==
=== Fiction ===
- W. Harrison Ainsworth – Rookwood
- Carl Jonas Love Almqvist – The Queen's Tiara
- Honoré de Balzac
  - The Quest of the Absolute
  - "Eugénie Grandet"
- Edward Bulwer
  - The Last Days of Pompeii
  - The Pilgrims of the Rhine
- Selina Davenport – Personation
- Benjamin Disraeli
  - The Infernal Marriage
  - A Year at Hartlebury
- Catherine Gore – The Hamiltons
- Tommaso Grossi – Marco Visconti
- Barbara Hofland – The Captives in India
- Harriet Martineau – Illustrations of Political Economy (nine volumes, in fictional form)
- James Justinian Morier – Ayesha the Maid of Kars
- Frederick Maurice – Eustace Conway
- Aleksandr Pushkin – The Queen of Spades (Russian: Пиковая дама – Pikovaya dama)
- Martin Archer Shee – Cecil Hyde
- Agnes C. Hall (as Rosalia St. Clair) – The Pauper Boy

=== Children and young people ===
- Frederick Marryat
  - Jacob Faithful
  - Peter Simple

=== Drama ===
- John Baldwin Buckstone – Isabelle; or, A Woman's Life
- Alfred Bunn – The Minister and the Mercer
- Alfred de Musset – Lorenzaccio
- Aleksander Fredro – Zemsta (Revenge)
- Franz Grillparzer – Der Traum, ein Leben (The Dream, a Life)
- Mary Russell Mitford – Charles the First
- Juliusz Słowacki
  - Balladyna
  - Kordian
- Henry Taylor – Philip van Artevelde

=== Poetry ===
- Samuel Taylor Coleridge – Poetical Works (last edition read in proof by author)
- Adam Mickiewicz – Pan Tadeusz

=== Non-fiction ===
- George Bancroft – History of the United States, volume 1
- Davy Crockett – A Narrative of the Life of David Crockett, written by himself
- George Godfrey Cunningham – Lives of Eminent and Illustrious Englishmen from Alfred the Great to the Latest Times, volume 1
- Henry Hallam, ed. – Remains in Verse and Prose of Arthur Henry Hallam
- Heinrich Heine – Zur Geschichte der Religion und Philosophie in Deutschland (The History of Religion and Philosophy in Germany)
- Søren Kierkegaard writing as 'A' – "Another Defense Of Woman's Great Abilities" ("Ogsaa et Forsvar for Qvindens hoie Anlæg"
- Richard Monckton Milnes – Memorials of a Tour in some Parts of Greece, Chiefly Poetical
- Lancelot Edward Threlkeld – An Australian Grammar

== Births ==
- January 1 – Ludovic Halévy, French playwright and author (died 1908)
- January 22 – Jennie Fowler Willing, American author, educator and reformer (died 1916)
- January 28 – Julia Carter Aldrich, American author and editor (died 1924)
- February 9 – Felix Dahn, German writer (died 1912)
- March – Thomas Purnell, Welsh-born English drama critic and essayist (died 1889)
- March 6 – George du Maurier, English cartoonist and novelist (died 1896)
- March 24 – Mary Lynde Craig, American writer and attorney (died 1921)
- March 24 – William Morris, English poet and designer (died 1896)
- March 27 – Melissa Elizabeth Banta, American poet, travel writer (died 1907)
- April 5 – Frank R. Stockton, American short story writer (died 1902)
- April 7 – Emma Southwick Brinton, American army nurse and foreign correspondent (died 1922)
- April 21 – Henry Spencer Ashbee, English bibliophile (died 1900)
- April 26 – Charles Farrar Browne (Artemus Ward), American humorist (died 1867)
- May 28 – Lavilla Esther Allen, American author, poet and reader (died 1903)
- July 9 – Jan Neruda, Czech writer (died 1891)
- August 31 – Esther Pugh, American reformer, editor and publisher (died 1908)
- September 9 – Joseph Henry Shorthouse, English novelist (died 1903)
- September 15 – Heinrich von Treitschke, German historian (died 1896)
- October 1 – Mary Mackellar, née Cameron, Scottish Gaelic poet and translator (died 1890)
- November 10 – José Hernández, Argentine poet (died 1886)
- November 23 – James Thomson ("Bysshe Vanolis"), Scottish poet (died 1882)
- unknown date – Percy Hetherington Fitzgerald, Irish-born literary biographer, drama critic and sculptor (died 1925)

== Deaths ==
- February 12 – Friedrich Schleiermacher, German theologian and philosopher (born 1768)
- February 17 – John Thelwall, British orator, writer, political reformer, journalist, poet, elocutionist and speech therapist (born 1764)
- May 13 – John Jones, Welsh Anglican priest and writer (born 1775)
- July 25 – Samuel Taylor Coleridge, English Romantic poet and critic (born 1772)
- September 16 – William Blackwood, Scottish publisher (born 1776)
- December 5 – Thomas Pringle, Scottish writer, poet and abolitionist (born 1789)
- December 23 – Thomas Malthus, English political economist (born 1766)
- December 27 – Charles Lamb, English essayist (erysipelas; born 1775)
