= Marek Żuławski =

- Born: 13 April 1908; Rome, Italy
- Died: 30 March 1985 (aged 76); London, United Kingdom
- Education: Warsaw Academy of Art
- Known for: Painting, graphic art, art history
- Notable work: still life, landscape, figurative art

Marek Żuławski (13 April 1908 – 30 March 1985) was a Polish painter, graphic artist, and art historian who settled in London in 1937.

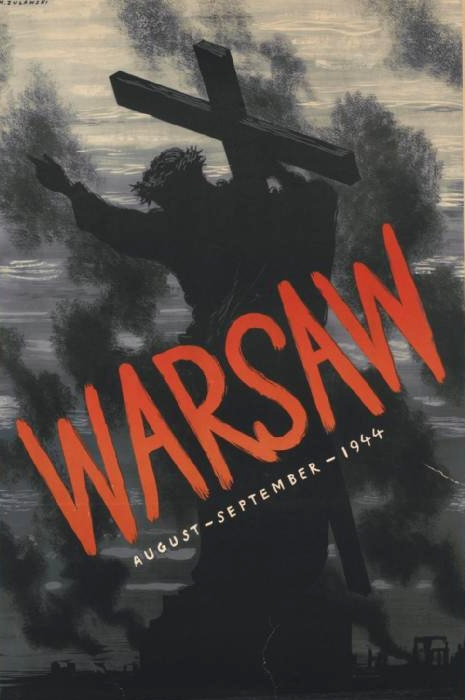
Warsaw Uprising poster 1944

== Background and career ==
He was born in Rome. His father was Jerzy Żuławski, a noted intellectual from a prolific extended family of artists, directors and climbers; his mother was Kazimiera Żuławska, née Hanicka. He was raised in Zakopane with his two younger brothers, Juliusz and Wawrzyniec. Later, the family moved to Toruń where he completed his secondary education.

Between 1926 and 1933 he studied at the Academy of Fine Arts in Warsaw under professors Felicjan Kowarski and Karol Tichy at the same time as his cousin, Jacek Żuławski. In 1935 he won a scholarship to study in Paris. In 1937 he moved permanently to London. There he frequented other Polish artists, including Feliks Topolski, Halima Nałęcz, Marian Szyszko-Bohusz and the Themersons.

Initially he was influenced by Post-Impressionism. After the war he honed his own style, tending towards a simpler form and a more muted palette. His subjects included still life and figurative art such as Chrystus z Belsen 1947, Tancerz 1957, Kain i Abel 1967, Żona Lota 1975 and Akt stojący II 1979, a work on paper. Apart from easel work, he completed several murals as in Our Lady's church in St John's Wood in London, illustrations and graphic art. He created posters (Gordon Bennet, 1935), still lifes and landscape paintings. Żuławski exhibited on numerous occasions at the London Group.

=== Written work ===
He also wrote art criticism and essays, notably, Od Hogartha do Bacona (1973), ("From Hogarth to Bacon"), and Romantyzm, klasycyzm i z powrotem (1976) ("Romanticism, classicism and back again"). He produced a number of talks about art for the BBC Polish Section. He wrote a two-part autobiography, Studium do autoportretu (1980), which was republished in a second edition by the publishing house Oficyna Wydawnicza Kucharski in Poland.

== Personal life ==
In 1938 he married Eugenia (Imogena) Różańska (1906–1982), but the marriage was short-lived. His second wife, Halina Korn (1902–1978), was also a writer and painter. In 1980 Żuławski married Maria Lewandowska. Their son, Adam, was born in January 1983.

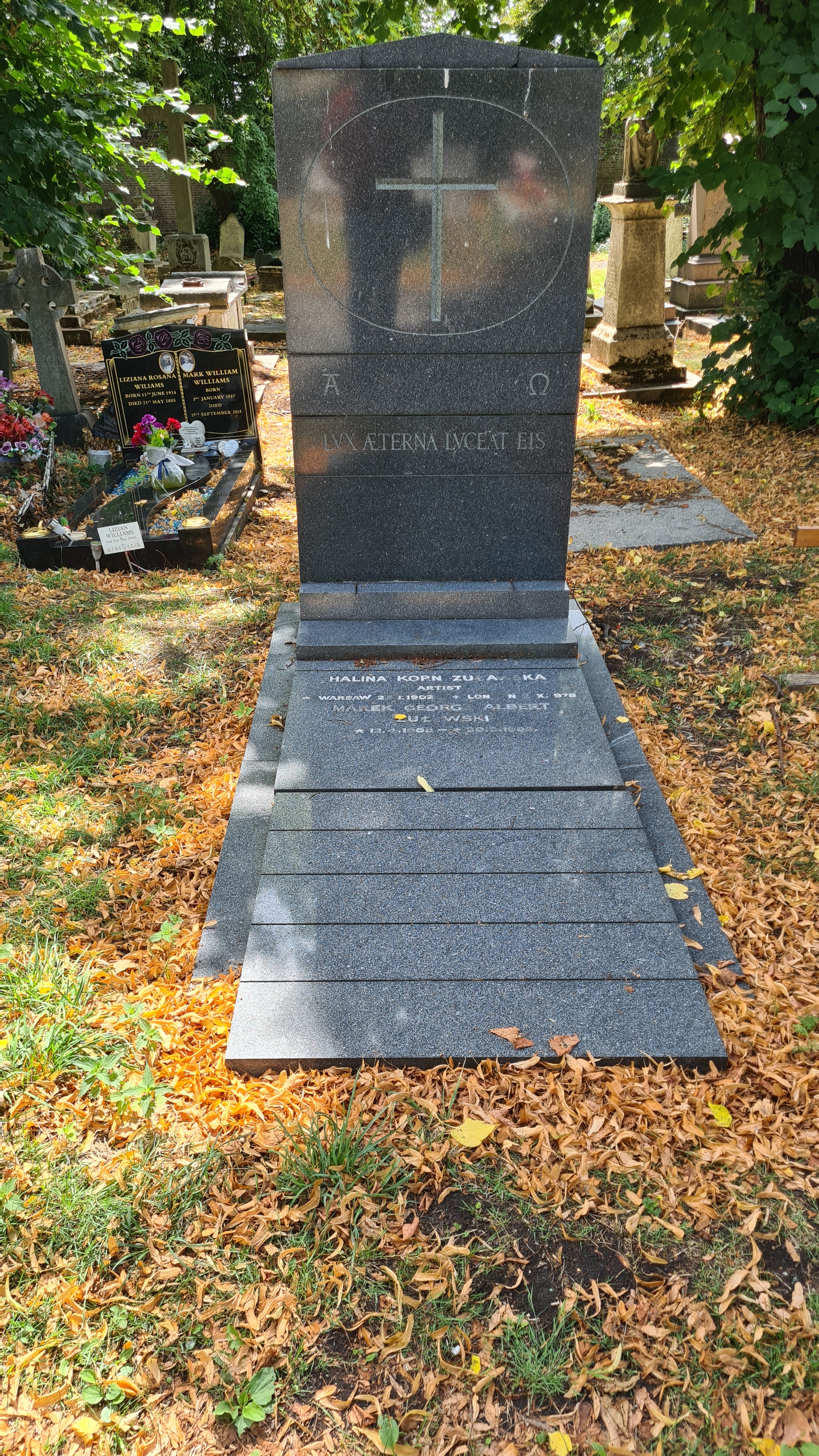
Tomb of Marek Żuławski aud his wife sculptor Halina Korn at Kensal Green Cemetery, London

In March 1985 Żuławski died in London. His archives are in the Archiwum Emigracji University of Torun Library, and a collection of his art – drawings, graphic art and paintings – is in the Torun University Museum.

== Notable artworks ==
- Gordon Bennet, 1935
- Quarry Worker, 1949
- Chrystus wśród ubogich, 1953
- Ludzie nad morzem, 1957
- Tancerz, 1957
- Zielony akt na pomarańczowym i czarnym tle, 1958
- Ecce homo II, 1958
- Ecce homo IV, 1961
- Trzy przedmioty na czerwonym tle, 1963/1968
- Kain i Abel, 1967
- Sen o lataniu, 1968
- Martwy człowiek, 1969
- The Team, 1971
- Caribbean Cruise, 1974
- Mechanical Man, 1975
- Żona Lota, 1975
- Marylka w sierpniu, 1979
- Akt stojący II, 1979
- Standing Nude, 1980
- Ojcostwo, 1980
- Wyżyna Golan, c. 1982
- Robotnik, unknown year

== Bibliography ==
- "Żuławski Marek". Internetowa encyklopedia PWN.
- "Żuławski Marek". WIEM Encyklopedia.
