= On the Silver Globe =

On the Silver Globe may refer to:

- On the Silver Globe (novel), first volume of the Polish science fiction epic Lunar Trilogy by Jerzy Żuławski
- On the Silver Globe (film), Polish film based on the novel, directed by Andrzej Żuławski
