= Rarotonga (disambiguation) =

Rarotonga is the largest and most populous of the Cook Islands, in the South Pacific.

Rarotonga may also refer to:

- Kingdom of Rarotonga, a predecessor state of the Cook Islands, 1858-1893
- Rarotonga (comics), a Mexican comic book series
- "Rarotonga" (song), on the 1992 self-titled album by Café Tacuba
- Rarotonga / Mount Smart, a dormant volcano in North Island, New Zealand
- Rarotonga hotspot, a volcanic hotspot
- Rarotonga International Airport
- Roman Catholic Diocese of Rarotonga

== See also ==
- Air Rarotonga, an airline
- Deity Figure from Rarotonga, a wooden sculpture of a male god made in the late eighteenth century or early nineteenth century
- Rarotonga homalium, a species of tree in the willow family (Homalium acuminatum)
- Rarotonga monarch, a species of bird in the flycatcher family
- Rarotonga starling, a species of bird
- Rarotonga Steam Railway
- Treaty of Rarotonga, the common name for the South Pacific Nuclear Free Zone Treaty
