= Woicki =

Woicki (feminine: Woicka; plural: Woiccy) is a Polish surname. Notable people with the surname include:

- Iwona Woicka-Żuławska (born 1972), Polish diplomat
- Paweł Woicki (born 1983), Polish volleyball player
