= Halina Korn =

British painter

Halina Korn, actual name: Halina Julia Korngold (22 January 1902 in Warsaw – 2 October 1978 in London) was a Polish painter, sculptor and writer of Jewish origin. She was the wife of Marek Żuławski.

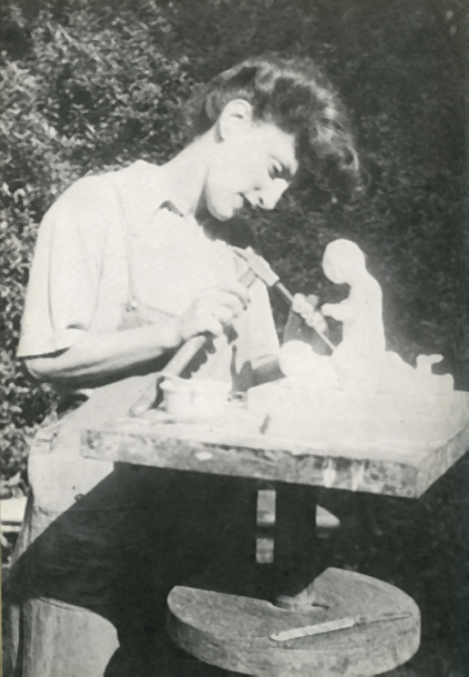
Halina Korn

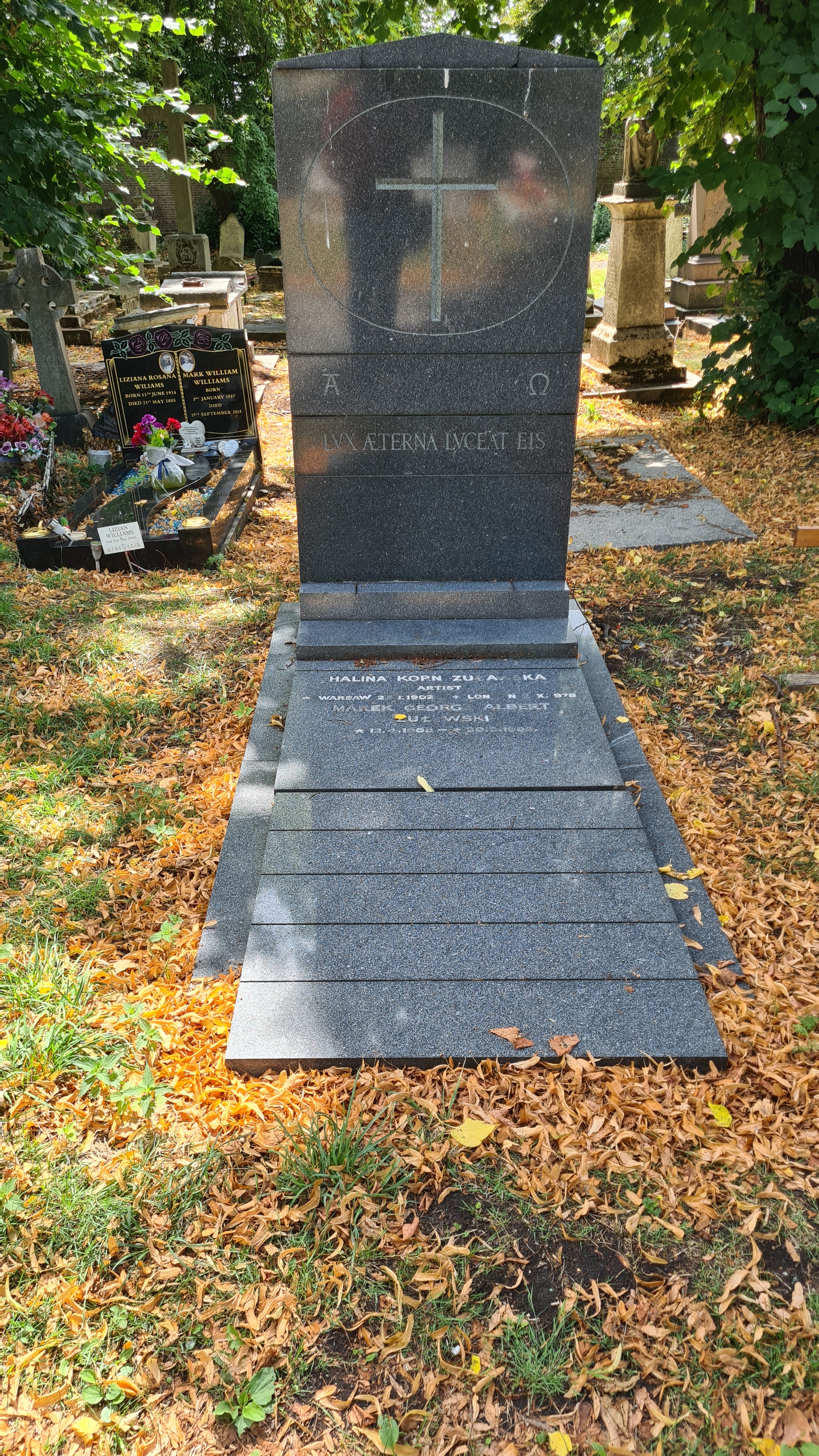
Tomb of Halina Korn and husband Marek Żuławski at Kensal Green Cemetery, London

== Biography ==
Her father, Julian, was a representative of foreign companies selling leather goods. Her mother, came from the Petite bourgeoisie and was brought up in a small provincial town near Lyon in France.

Before the war, Korngold studied journalism in the Warsaw School of Political Sciences. At the same time she took singing lessons from Adela Comte-Wilgocka and the distinguished Stanisława Korwin-Szymanowska, sister of Karol Szymanowski. In August 1939 she left for France, where she was overtaken by the outbreak of World War II. In Paris, she worked as a typist in the Ministry of Welfare, part of the Polish government-in-exile, with which she moved to Angers. After the Fall of France in May 1940, she came to Great Britain where she stayed until the end of her life. She started painting and sculpting in 1941 and signed her works as "Korn". In January 1948, she had her first solo exhibition entitled, "Paintings of London Life" in London's Mayor Gallery. In the fifties, she wrote exhibition reviews and texts about art for the BBC Polish Section. In 1965, due to increasing mental illness - bipolar disorder, she underwent neuro-surgery which brought her creativity to a stop. She is the author of Wakacje kończą się we wrześniu (Holidays end in September), published in 1983, with a preface by Stefan Themerson.

It was everyday life, watched and caught in London streets, and people (she neither understood or liked abstraction) that became the subject of her work from the beginning. She painted the world around her: women in a mechanical laundry, a boy with a chunk of meat, mannequins in a shop window, coalmen, men and women on an escalator and people in a coffee shop.

She depicted scenes of parks, psychology clinics, funerals, circuses as well as strip-joints. Maternity was a common motif in her works, particularly in sculpture. Halina Korn's creativity, difficult to classify, was considered to be part of the Naive Art movement. Among others, Ignacy Witz, Feliks Topolski and Aleksander Jackowski wrote about her in his encyclopaedic outline entitled Sztuka zwana naiwną (Art termed naive). Quite a few critics emphasized her infallible flair for composition and form as well as her extraordinary sensitivity to colour.

She had a few solo exhibitions in London, Edinburgh and New York, including a series of exhibitions in Poland (Warsaw, Cracow, Gdynia, Katowice). In England, she exhibited with the London Group, in Royal Academy, Women's International Art Club. She was the member of Artists' International Association (AIA) and a founding member of the Arts Society of Paddington. Halina Korn's works are in the National Museum, Warsaw and in Poznań, University Museum in Toruń, London's Ben Uri Gallery & Museum among others and in numerous private collections, including in The Anthony Petullo Collection of Self-Taught and Outsider Art.

She was buried in London's Kensal Green Cemetery on 6 October 1978.

== Selected exhibitions ==
- 1948: Mayor Gallery, London
- 1953: Beaux Arts Gallery, London
- 1960: Gallery One, London
- 1962: Galerie Norval, New York
- 1964: Traverse Theatre Gallery, Edinburgh
- 1965: New Artists’ Forum, London
- 1967: The Fine Arts Association, Warsaw
- 1981: Camden Arts Centre, London

== Bibliography ==
- Martyn Goff, Marek Zulawski and Halina Korn, "Studio" 1956 vol. 152, p. 108-111.
- Feliks Topolski, Halinka, "Wiadomości" 1979 nr 3, p. 5.
- Halina Korn-Żuławska, [in:] Aleksander Jackowski, Sztuka zwana naiwną. Zarys encyklopedyczny twórczości w Polsce, Warsaw 1995, p. 86.
- Philip Vann, Face to Face: British Self-portraits in the Twentieth Century, London 2004, p. 69.
- Marek Żuławski, Studium do autoportretu, Toruń 2009.
