= List of ambassadors of Poland to Norway =

Poland Ambassador to Norway
- Ambasador Rzeczypospolitej Polskiej w Norwegii
- Coat of arms of Poland
- Incumbent; Małgorzata Kosiura-Kaźmierska since 2024
- Style: Mrs. Ambassador (informal); Her Excellency (diplomatic)
- Reports to: Polish Ministry of Foreign Affairs
- Seat: Oslo, Norway
- Appointer: President of Poland
- Term length: No fixed term
- Website: Embassy of Poland, Norway

The Polish ambassador to Norway (formally the ambassador of the Republic of Poland to the Kingdom of Norway) is the official representative of the president and the government of Poland to the king and government of Norway. Until 2013, the Polish ambassador to Norway was accredited to Iceland.

Diplomatic relations between Poland and Norway were established in 1919. Embassy of Poland in Norway is located in Oslo's borough of Frogner.

== List of ambassadors of Poland to Norway ==
=== Second Polish Republic ===
- 1919–1921: Czesław Pruszyński (envoy)
- 1921–1924: Henryk Sokolnicki (chargé d'affaires)
- 1924–1927: Michał Kwapiszewski (chargé d'affaires)
- 1927–1931: Leszek Malczewski (envoy)
- 1931–1942: Władysław Neuman (envoy)
- 1942–1945: Władysław Günther-Schwarzburg (envoy)

=== People's Polish Republic ===
- 1946–1948: Mieczysław Rogalski (envoy)
- 1948–1954: Józef Giebułtowicz (envoy)
- 1957–1959: Albert Morski (envoy)
- 1959–1961: Halina Kowalska (chargé d'affaires)
- 1961–1963: Kaziemierz Dorosz (envoy)
- 1963–1967: Wiktor Jabczyński (chargé d'affaires)
- 1967–1969: Mieczysław Łobodycz
- 1969–1973: Przemysław Ogrodziński
- 1973–1974: Czesław Godek (chargé d'affaires)
- 1974–1975: Tadeusz Wianecki (chargé d'affaires)
- 1975–1978: Romuald Poleszczuk
- 1978–1979: Jerzy Roszak
- 1979: Henryk Wendrowski
- 1979–1982: Henryk Jęsiak
- 1981–1985: Karol Nowakowski
- 1985–1988: Franciszek Stachowiak

=== Third Polish Republic ===
- 1988–1992: Karol Nowakowski
- 1991–1996: Lech Sokół
- 1996–2001: Stanisław Czartoryski
- 2001–2005: Andrzej Jaroszyński
- 2005–2007: Ryszard Czarny
- 2007:Włodzimierz Anioł (chargé d’affaires)
- 2007–2012: Wojciech Kolańczyk
- 2012–2016: Stefan Czmur
- 2016–2018: Marian Siemakowicz (chargé d’affaires)
- 2018–2023: Iwona Woicka-Żuławska
- since 2024: Małgorzata Kosiura-Kaźmierska (chargé d’affaires until April 2025)

== See also ==
- Embassy of Poland, Oslo
