= Rarotonga Steam Railway =

Tourist railway on Rarotonga, Cook Islands

Coordinates: 21°12′25″S 159°46′15″W

The Rarotonga Steam Railway was a short tourist railway on Rarotonga in the Cook Islands.

== History ==
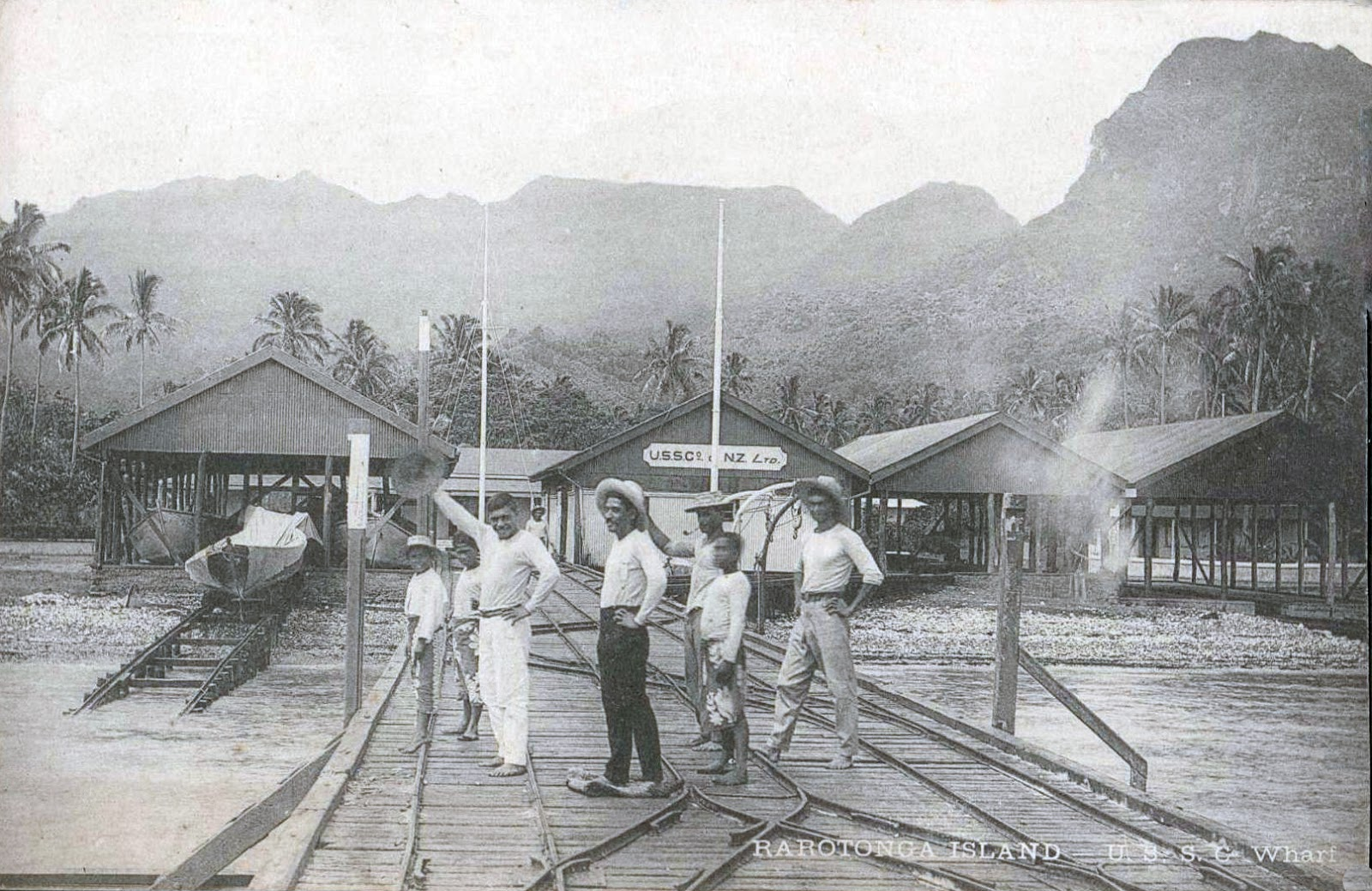
Avarua. Tracks on the wharf around 1914. Photo by George Crummer.

Around 1914 the Union Steam Ship Company of New Zealand had railway tracks in Avarua's wharf.

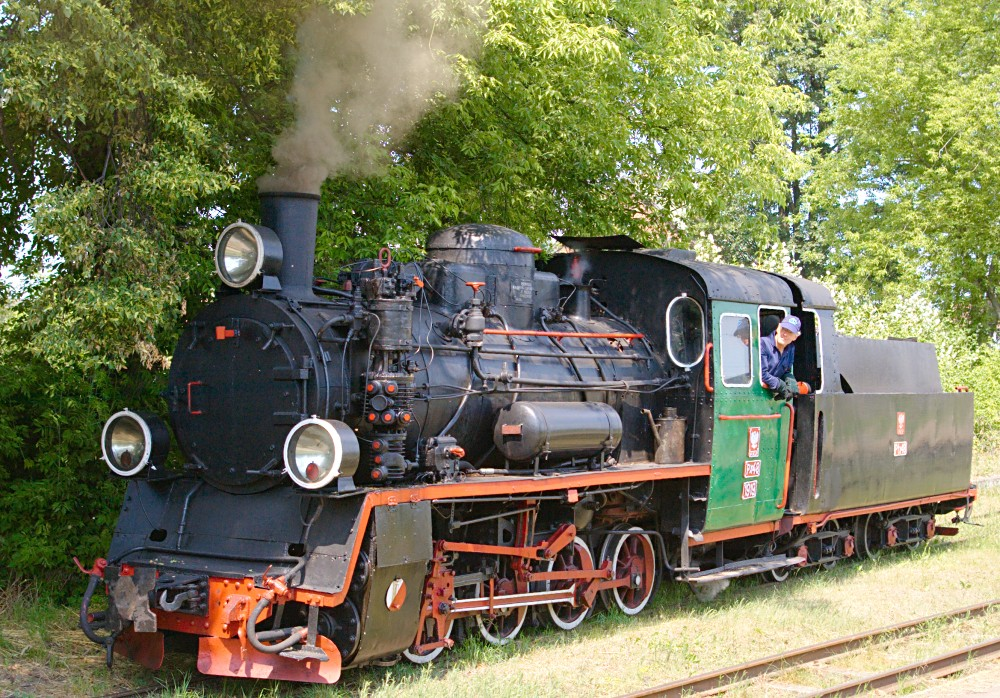
Locomotive Px48-1919 in Poland, Stare Bojanowo

There was no railway line in operation on the Cook Islands until the beginning of the 1990s. In 1991 or 1992 a resident of Rarotonga, Tim Arnold, a descendant of Field Marshal Gebhard Leberecht von Blücher, purchased a working steam locomotive in Poland and brought it to Avarua. It was a 750 mm (2 ft 5 1/2 in) gauge Polish 0-8-0. In Poland, it was Px48-1741. It had been built in 1951 by the Pierwsza Fabryka Lokomotyw w Polsce Fablok in Chrzanów, Poland, with the serial number 2126, and used on the local railways in Krośniewice, Kaliska and Żuławska. Arnold laid about 170 metres of track on his family property.

The railway is in need of repair, and no longer in working condition. The locomotive and other equipment are stored on the island awaiting possible further use. There is a proposal to transfer the locomotive to the new narrow-gauge railway near Lake Wakatipu in New Zealand.
