= Jerzy Żuławski =

Polish philosopher and writer (1874–1915)

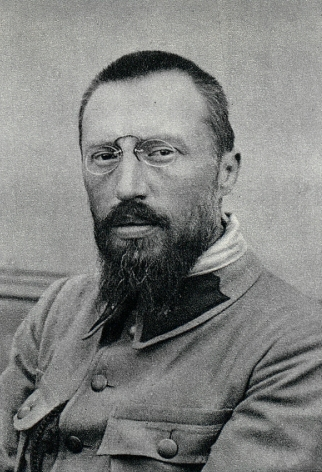
- Żuławski c. 1914–1915
- Born: Jerzy Żuławski; 14 July 1874; Lipowiec, Galicia, Austria-Hungary
- Died: 9 August 1915 (aged 41); Dębica, Galicia, Austria-Hungary
- Education: University of Bern
- Occupations: Philosopher; writer; poet; playwright; essayist; translator; alpinist; patriot
- Notable work: The Lunar Trilogy (1903-1911); Laus feminae (1914-1916)
- Spouse: Kazimiera Żuławska (m. 1907)
- Children: Marek; Juliusz; Wawrzyniec
- Relatives: Zygmunt (brother); Mirosław (nephew); Andrzej (great-nephew)
- Awards: Cross of Independence

Jerzy Żuławski (Polish: [ˈjɛʐɨ ʐuˈwafski]; 14 July 1874 – 9 August 1915) was a Polish philosopher and writer. He is best known for writing the pioneering science-fiction epic The Lunar Trilogy (1903–1911).

Born into a patriotic family in the village of Lipowiec in Austrian Galicia, he studied engineering briefly at the Zurich Polytechnic before pursuing philosophy at the University of Bern under the empirio-criticist Richard Avenarius. In 1898 he received his doctorate for the dissertation "Das Problem der Kausalität bei Spinoza" (published 1899), later expanded into the popular Polish philosophy study Benedict Spinoza. Man and His Work (1902). He also engaged deeply with Nietzsche, Schopenhauer, Eduard von Hartmann, the Bible, the Talmud, and Eastern thought. These influences shaped his own philosophy of "synthetic monism", which held that Being is simultaneously material and spiritual; the Absolute and an ongoing process. He was concerned with the future of culture, the role of the creative individual, and the dangers of a materially satisfied but spiritually stagnant society.

After a short period as a secondary-school teacher, he devoted himself fully to literature from around 1902. He belonged to the Kraków Young Poland circle, was close to Stanisław Przybyszewski, Jan Kasprowicz, Lucjan Rydel, and Kazimierz Przerwa-Tetmajer; he also had his portrait painted by Stanisław Wyspiański. From 1910 he lived mainly in Zakopane, where he co-founded the Tatra Volunteer Search and Rescue and kept an open literary house.

Żuławski wrote The Lunar Trilogy between 1901 and 1911. Combining scientific romance with philosophical and anthropological inquiry, the trilogy explores the genesis of religion and myth, the cyclical nature of civilization, and the persistence of human flaws. It is regarded as a foundational work of Eastern European and Polish science fiction and strongly influenced Stanisław Lem. The first volume contains one of the earliest literary depictions of an electrically powered lunar rover; this concept later inspired Polish engineer Mieczysław G. Bekker in his work on the Apollo Lunar Roving Vehicles. In the third volume Żuławski anticipated the idea of an nuclear weapon—a weapon that would split the atom and destroy cities or continents—several years before H. G. Wells' The World Set Free (1914). The trilogy was adapted into the 1988 cult film On the Silver Globe by Żuławski's grand-nephew, director Andrzej Żuławski.

At the outbreak of the First World War, Żuławski joined Piłsudski's Polish Legions, served as an officer and editor of the Legion newspaper Do Broni, and died of typhus in a field hospital in Dębica at the age of 41.

== Early life, education and studies in philosophy ==
Jerzy Żuławski was born into a strongly patriotic Polish household in the village of Lipowiec, near Rzeszów, a major city in the region of Galicia. In 1772, Galicia, with its capital Lwów, was separated from Poland in the First Partition and, for the next 146 years, became part of the Austrian Habsburg Empire. Eleven years before Jerzy's birth, his father Kazimerz Żuławski, a country squire, had participated in the 1863 January Uprising against Czarist rule in the Russian portion of partitioned Poland. Kazimierz had a great influence on young Jerzy's life and Jerzy shared many of the views his father expressed.

Educated at good schools in Limanowa, Bochnia and Kraków, Żuławski was in Switzerland from 1892 to 1899, where he studied first at the University of Zürich and then pursued his doctorate of philosophy at the University of Bern under the guidance of the eminent positivist Richard Avenarius (1843–1896), who died before the completion of Żuławski's dissertation on Spinoza, Das Problem der Kausalität bei Spinoza, which was published in Bern in 1899. Żuławski subsequently revised and expanded his German-language text into a 1902 Polish popular-philosophy book, Bededykt Spinoza, Człowiek i Dzieło (Benedict Spinoza. Man and His Work). He also wrote about, and provided the first Polish translations of some of the works of Nietzsche, Schopenhauer and Eduard von Hartmann as well as the original Hebrew Old Testament and Talmud and the writings of a number of Eastern philosophers.

== First writings ==
The earliest publication bearing Jerzy Żuławski's name was also written in Bern. Dispatched to a Kraków publishing concern, the slim collection entitled Na strunach duszy (On the Strings of the Soul) was offered to the public in 1895. While a volume of Polish-language poetry in German-speaking Bern did not make much of an impact, the young author did receive moderate praise from the few Polish press organs that reviewed it. A decade later, at the height of Żuławski's brief fame, it came to be viewed as an experimental work, not truly representative of his real ability. He returned to Poland in spring 1899 to co-edit the literary magazine Krytyka (Critique) and initially became a schoolteacher in Jasło and, following his marriage, in Kraków. A number of his essays were published in another literary publication, the Kraków-based Życie (Life).

== Philosophical outlook ==
Żuławski's studies shaped the construct of his philosophical world view, which he referred to as syntetyczny monizm ("synthetic monism"). He planned to use the method to conceptually solve the dilemmas facing the early-20th century generation of intellectuals known as Młoda Polska (Young Poland). An advocate of metaphysics and the idea of putting art in its service, he tried to give a tangible shape to the slogan "naga dusza" ("naked soul") and the theory of the symbol as an expression of the Absolute. Along with other contemporary theorists, he was concerned with the problems of the development and future of culture, the responsibility of intellectual leadership within the circumstances of creativity and the role of the individual in the life of society. The central thesis of synthetic monism revolved around the idea of Being as an entity simultaneously spiritual and material, the Absolute and the Process.

== The Lunar Trilogy ==
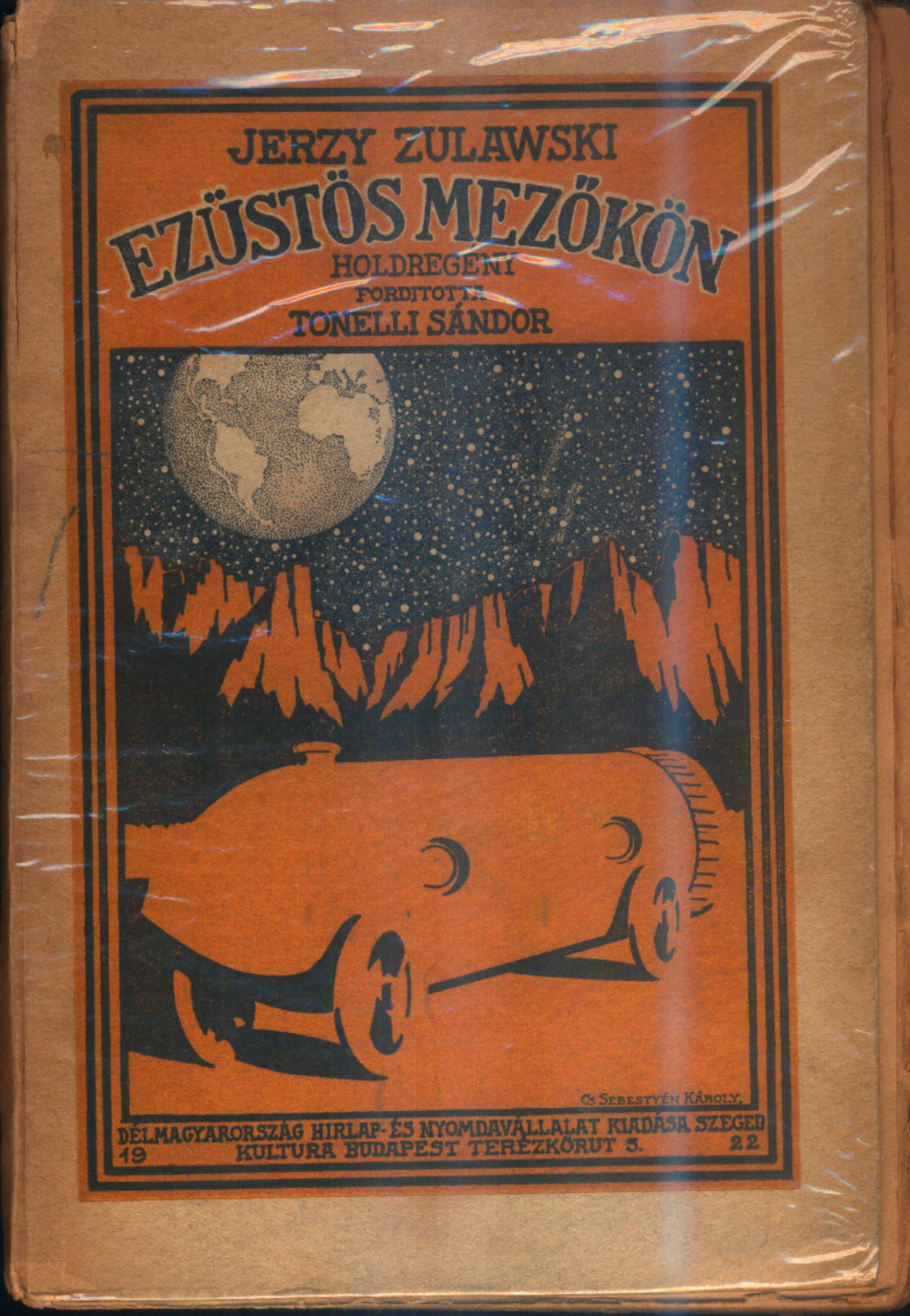
Cover of Ezüstös mezőkön (ca.1922), Hungarian version of Na srebrnym globie (On the Silver Globe)

By the end of 1901, Żuławski had largely abandoned teaching and devoted himself entirely to traveling and writing, including the completion of the first volume of his magnum opus about a tragically ill-fated Moon expedition, On the Silver Globe, which has as its final words, "Pisałem w Krakowie, w zimie 1901–2" ("I wrote in Kraków in the winter of 1901–2"). Following common practice of the period, the novel was written in installments, each of which was published, upon completion, in the literary journal Głos Narodu (The Voice of the Nation) between December 1901 and April 1902 and subsequently appeared in re-edited form as a 1903 book in Lwów.

For the next five years it was a stand-alone work, but between autumn 1908 and spring 1909, installments of a sequel entitled Zwycięzca (The Conqueror) appeared in the pages of Kurier Warszawski (Warsaw Courier). Continuing the story generations and centuries later on the Moon, it was a longer, more complex and more philosophical work than On the Silver Globe. Its publication in re-edited book form came in 1910. 1910 also saw the first installments of the final volume, Stara Ziemia (The Old Earth). It was an immediate continuation of The Conqueror, following two of the diminutive human denizens of the Moon who use the spaceship of the previous volume's protagonist, the already-martyred Marek the Conqueror, to return to the planet of their ancestors. Głos Narodu, the same journal which serialized On the Silver Globe, now completed the trilogy by continuing the installments to their conclusion in spring 1911, with a re-edited book version coming out later that year.

The first edition of the complete three-volume set was first published in Lwów in 1912. Beginning shortly thereafter and continuing over the following decades, The Lunar Trilogy was widely read in virtually every European language, with one notable exception—it had not been translated into English at the time of its initial publication (it would only be translated in 2020).

== Marriage, sons and later works ==
In 1907, Żuławski married for the second time and, in his few remaining years, became the father of three sons, Marek (1908–1985), Juliusz (1910–1999) and Wawrzyniec (1916–1957).

Starting in 1901, and as time permitted, Żuławski had lived on and off in his favorite location, Zakopane, Poland's best-known mountaineering town. By 1910, he had finally bought a large house there and settled with his growing family. He became the co-editor of the local literary journal, Zakopane, and welcomed many notable writers and friends, such as Kazimierz Przerwa-Tetmajer, Jan Kasprowicz and Leopold Staff, who paid regular visits. A dedicated traveler and sportsman, he climbed many of Europe's mountains and visited much of the continent in between his writing. His poems appeared frequently in Polish literary magazines, such as Życie(Life), Młodość(Youth), Krytyka (Critique), Strumień (Stream), Chimera (Chimera e.g. Idle Fancy) and Słowo Polskie (The Polish Word) and he continued to produce short stories, essays, translations and other works for the next four years.

== World War I and death ==
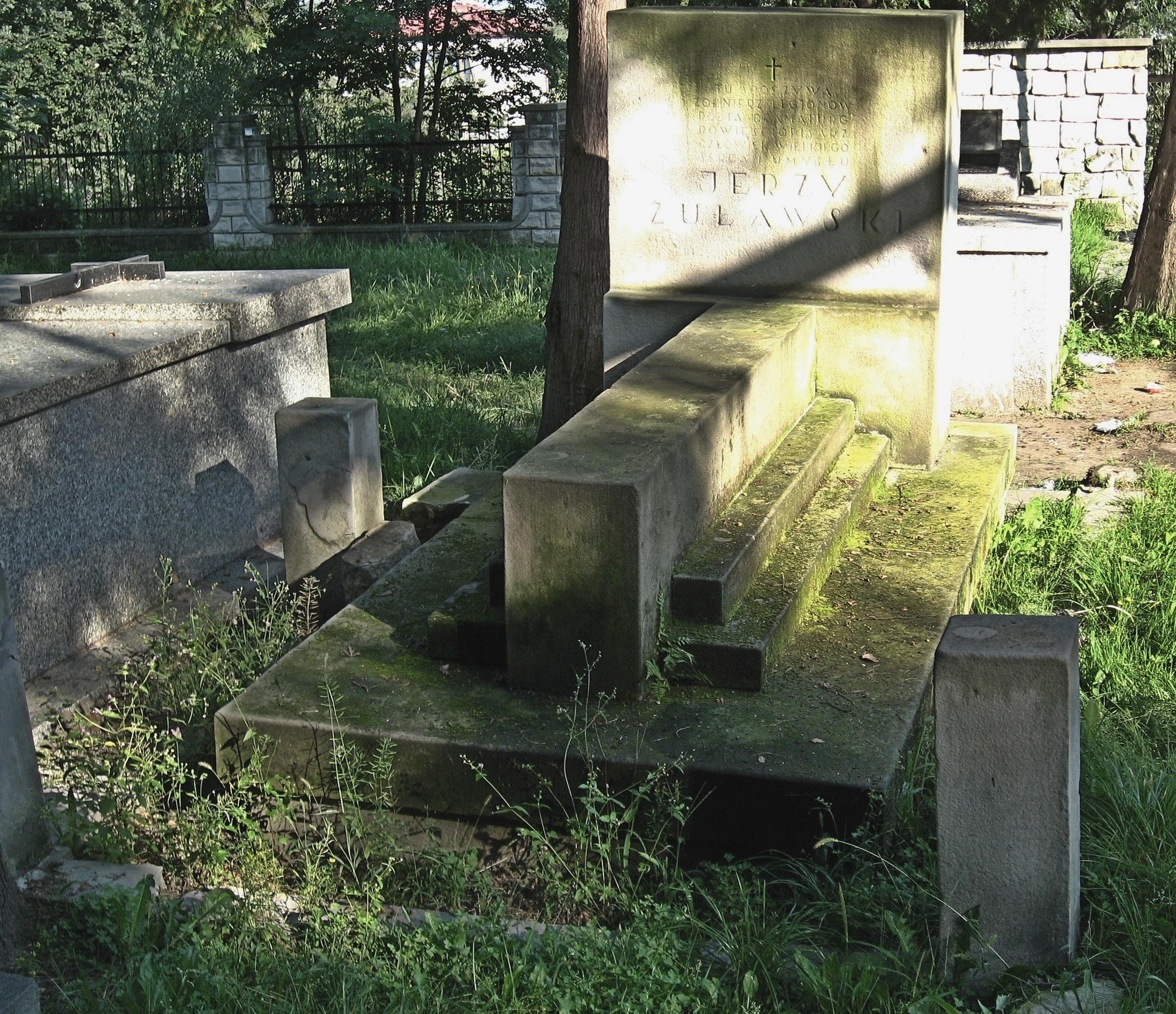
Grave, Dębica, Poland

In the first days of August 1914, as the three entities of partitioned Poland—Russia, Germany and Austro-Hungary were entering the First World War, Jerzy Żuławski made the only decision he felt reflected his principles and joined Piłsudski's Legions to fight for the cause of regaining Polish independence. He wrote home regularly from the front and, due to his high literary repute, was given a major position on the Legion's journalistic staff in Łódź, where he edited and wrote for their newspaper Do Broni (To Arms). At the end of 1914 he was assigned to Naczelny Komitet Narodowy (Supreme [Polish] National Committee) in Vienna and, in April 1915, was moved to Piotrków where he served at the Legion Headquarters as a liaison to the First Brigade command. During a visit to the front in early August, he contracted typhus and, after a few days' illness, died at a field hospital in Dębica. He was 41 years old. His third son, Wawrzyniec, was born six months later, on 14 February 1916.

== Family ==
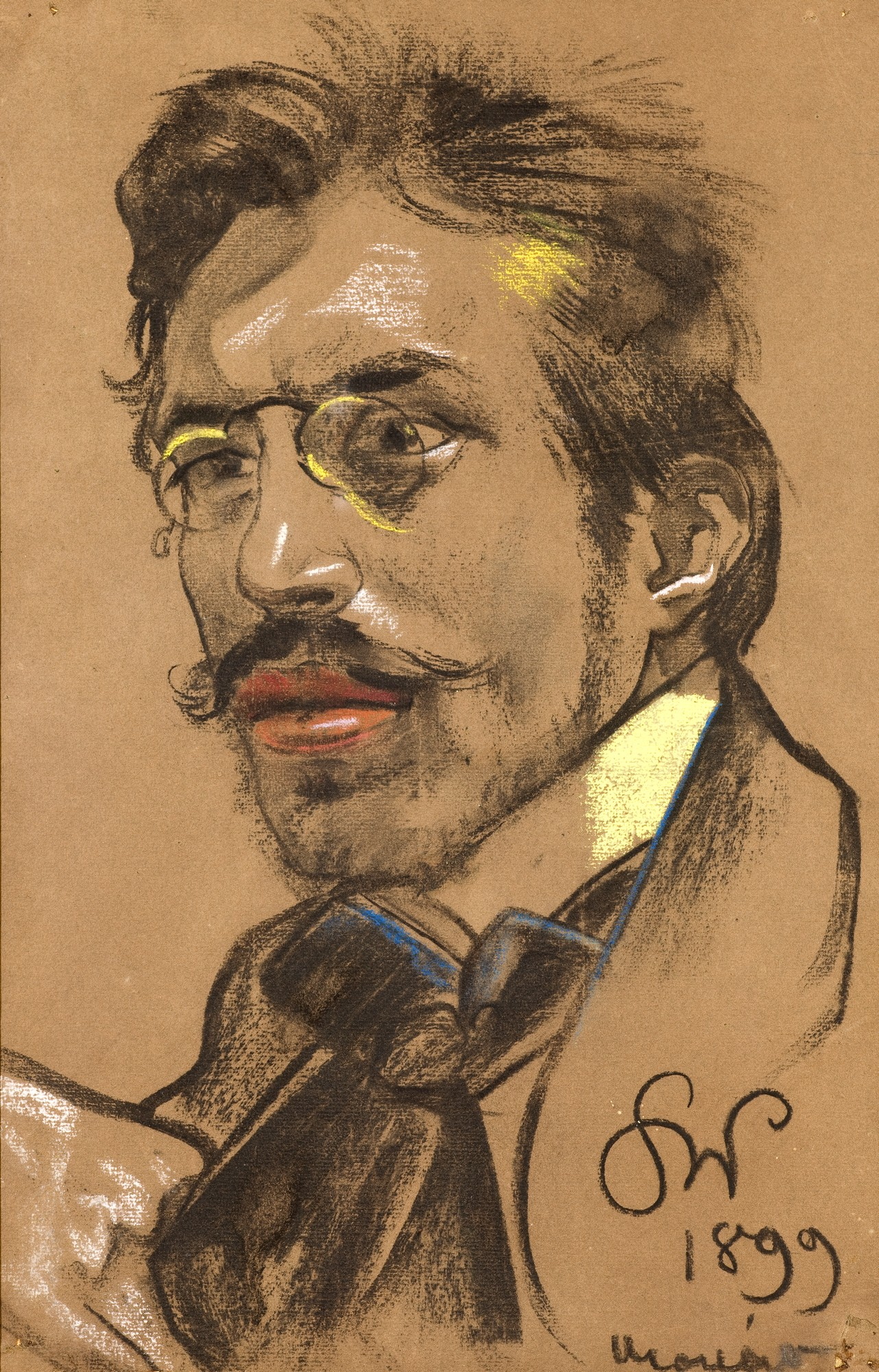
Portrait of Żuławski by Stanisław Wyspiański, collection of the National Museum in Wrocław

Marek, whose birth coincided with his father's starting work on The Conqueror, became the namesake of the epic tale's tragic hero.

Jerzy's widow, Kazimiera Żuławska, subsequently resettled with their sons in Warsaw, where they remained into the Second World War. Due to Jerzy's early death, the boys did not have the opportunity to gain their father's experience first-hand, but all three inherited his dedication to alpinism, spending much of their time participating in mountaineering expeditions. The three brothers also gained renown in the arts—Marek as a painter, Juliusz, emulating his father, as a poet, novelist and translator of poetry, and Wawrzyniec as a composer. Kazimiera and son Wawrzyniec were particularly helpful to the Polish Resistance and sheltered Jews in their apartment, an act which would have resulted in death at the hands of the German occupiers if they were caught. As a result, both were listed as Righteous Among the Nations after the war. Wawrzyniec who, in his widely praised musical career, was known by his full name, Wawrzyniec Jerzy Żuławski was also a dedicated mountain rescue specialist. He was 41, the same age as his father, when he died in the midst of a 1957 ice avalanche in the Alps, while participating in a rescue mission.

=== Grand-nephew Andrzej Żuławski ===
Filmmaker and author Andrzej Żuławski, the grandson of Jerzy Żuławski's brother, sought artistic freedom from the continuous censorship of Poland's Communist government by exiling himself to France in 1972, where he achieved success and critical acclaim for his 1975 film L'important c'est d'aimer (The Important Thing Is to Love). Such fame accruing to a Polish artist caused the powers in charge of Poland's cultural affairs to re-evaluate their assessment of Żuławski, and the director was invited to return as the creator of a project of his own choosing.

Andrzej Żuławski had always wanted to film his granduncle's masterwork and saw the offer as a unique opportunity to achieve that aim. An auteur, whom a number of critics have described as a self-destructive genius, he devoted over two years to the task of adapting the first two volumes to the screen (he judged The Old Earth which, except for the first chapter, takes place entirely on our own planet, to be outside the scope of this already-overlong undertaking). Between 1975 and 1977, he wrote the screenplay and lensed the film on various locations around Poland, as well as Crimea, the Caucasus Mountains and even the Gobi Desert.

In spring 1977, however, the project came to a sudden halt with the appointment of the hardline ideologue Janusz Wilhelmi as the Vice-Minister of Culture. Perceiving the Selenites' battle against the Szerns as a thinly veiled allegory of the Polish people's struggle with totalitarianism, Wilhelmi shut down the filming, which was 80% complete and ordered all materials destroyed. Andrzej Żuławski, who wrote that he was in despair over the loss and waste of so much artistic effort, went back to France, but the reels of unfinished film, instead of being destroyed, were preserved, along with costumes and props, by the Polish film studio and archives and by members of the film's cast and crew. Wilhelmi died a few months later, in a March 1978 plane crash, but a passage of another eight years was required, as glasnost and perestroika began to thaw the Cold War-dominated Eastern Europe, for Żuławski to be able to return again to Poland and edit the still-unfinished remnants into a 166-minute rough approximation of what the finished film might have been. Adopting the title of the trilogy's first volume, On the Silver Globe premiered at the Cannes Film Festival in May 1988, with some critics proclaiming it a ruined masterpiece.

== Published works ==
=== Poetry ===
Żuławski's poetry is primarily confined to the 1895–1904 period. In subsequent years his occasional poems found their way into the many literary journals that he edited, and were gathered, along with some essays and other pieces, in a posthumous collection of miscellanea published in the early 1920s. One of his most famous poems was transformed into a song, which was still sung during the Second World War by Polish fighters. Do moich synów (To My Sons) was written during his brief 1914 wartime service in Vienna and put to music by Stanisław Ekiert.

- 1895 - Na strunach duszy (On the Strings of the Soul)
- 1897 - Intermezzo
- 1897 - Stance o pieśni (Songs for Stanca)
- 1900 - Poezje II (Poetry II)
- 1902 - Z domu niewoli (From the House of Enslavement)
- 1904 - Pokłosie (Ears of Grain)

=== Plays ===
Between 1904 and 1907, the main focus of Żuławski's creative energies was directed towards writing plays. His initial dramas were patriotic reminders of Poland's struggle for independence, but subsequently he began to undertake themes of psychological insight and the emancipation of youth. The most successful of the plays, the dreamlike Eros and Psyche understood the spirit of the age in giving expression to the audience's innermost thoughts through the symbolic vehicles of myth, legend and fantasy. The occasional historical costume dramas also tended to emphasize poetic expression and blank verse over harsh reality. Żuławski's theatrical endeavors were viewed with suspicion by many critics who called them controversial and unconventional, but most were widely popular with audiences, especially when exhibited by such renowned masters of stagecraft as Tadeusz Pawlikowski and performed by top stars, such as Irena Solska.

- 1903 - Dyktator (The Dictator) [written to commemorate the fortieth anniversary of the 1863 January Uprising]
- 1903 - Wianek mirtowy (A Myrtle Wreath)
- 1904 - Eros i Psyche (Eros and Psyche), later adapted as libretto for Ludomir Rozycki's opera of the same title
- 1905 - Ijola (Iolanthe)
- 1906 - Donna Aluica
- 1906 - Koniec Mesjasza (The End of the Messiah) [which explores some of the philosophical and metaphysical themes later raised in The Conqueror—the inability to offer salvation and the limits of martyrdom]
- 1906 - Gra (The Game)
- 1909 - Za cenę łez (For the Price of Tears)
- 1911 - Gród Słońca (The Castle City of the Sun)

=== Fiction ===
One of Żuławski's most renowned works is The Lunar Trilogy, which was first published as a complete set in book form in Lwów in 1912. Part a work of science fiction, partly philosophical tract, the trilogy offers an essentially pessimistic dissection of human character, the creation of religious myths and the unattainable desire for utopian salvation. Anchored on the persistence of the Christian concept of the Savior, the work's various elements provide an ironic and regressive portrayal of human society and civilization.

Jerzy Żuławski wrote numerous short stories, but his only other novels are two volumes of another projected trilogy, Laus Feminae (the title is a Latin expression, Praise to Women). Again following established practice, as in the case of The Lunar Trilogy, each volume was published in journal installments between 1912 and 1913 and then in book form in 1913 and 1914, on the eve of World War I. Meant to be a dissection of contemporary society, this work had the potential of becoming another acclaimed epic, but fell victim to the times and circumstances in which it appeared, failing in its quest for the proper opportunity to find an audience. Never republished or translated into other languages, it has languished in obscurity for nearly a century and, as in the case of some of Żuławski's plays, may be due for a reappraisal.

=== Other writings ===
Due to the volume of his contributions to magazines and newspapers, Żuławski built up a large number of lesser-known texts which, in addition to short stories and poems, include critical essays and discussions of philosophy. Some of those were collected and published well after his death, in the 1920s and 30s and many others remain scattered and unknown. Additionally, Żuławski was held in high regard as a multi-lingual literary translator, especially of poetry, rendering into Polish the poems of Nietzsche, Richepin and many selections from the original Hebrew texts of the Old Testament.

== Legacy ==
In a twenty-year writing career, from his first book of poems in 1895, at the age of 21, to his final World War I dispatches in 1915, Jerzy Żuławski created an impressive body of work—seven volumes of poetry, three collections of literary criticism, numerous cultural and philosophical essays, ten plays and five novels. He was considered an important and influential intellectual figure in the early years of the 20th century, but a century later, the only creation which has remained in print and assured him literary immortality is The Lunar Trilogy. Stanisław Lem (1921–2006), renowned as the "most widely read science-fiction writer in the world", contributed an introduction to the 1956 and 1975 editions of the Trilogy's initial volume, Na Srebrnym Globie (On the Silver Globe), crediting Żuławski's words with inspiring him to become "a writer of the fantastic" and describing the time he spent reading The Lunar Trilogy as "one of the most fascinating and life-changing experiences" of his youth.

In 2008, the Jerzy Żuławski Award for best science fiction work in Poland, was established.

== See also ==
- List of Poles
