= John Antoine Nau =

French poet and writer

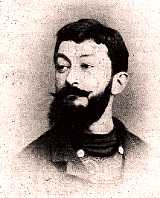
John Antoine Nau

John Antoine Nau (1860–1918), real name Eugène Léon Édouard Torquet, was a French poet and writer most famous for his novel Enemy Force, which won the first Prix Goncourt in 1903.

== Life ==
He was born on November 19, 1860, in San Francisco, California and was thus an American citizen. His father, an engineer and businessman, had emigrated from France to California about 1845 and become a naturalized citizen. Attacked by typhus, he died in 1864, leaving a widow and three children. In 1866 they returned to France, first to Le Havre and then to Paris. In 1881 at the age of 21 years Nau boarded a three-master doing business in Haiti and the West Indies as a pilot's assistant. Later he became Assistant Commissioner and traveled to Colombia, Venezuela and New York.

He returned to France during 1883 and married in 1885. For their honeymoon Nau and his bride went to Martinique, planning to stay, but family obligations forced them to return to France. Nau would never return to Martinique. In 1886, he lived in San Raphaél; 1887 in Piriac; then elsewhere. While living in Carteret in La Manche he wrote his first book of poetry, Au seuil de l'espoir (On the Threshold of Hope), which he published in 1897 at his own expense. He was 37 years old. Then to Majorca in 1898, to Tenerife in the Canaries. In Puerto de la Orotava he began his novel, finished in Andalusia. Between 1903 and 1906 he settled in Saint Tropez. In 1903, again at his own expense, he published Enemy Force. It was a commercial failure, and was not even reviewed because the author did not send it to the critics. But he never wrote to make a living; he wrote only for his own pleasure. He relocated to Algers, then to Corsica for seven years (his record). The war caused him to return to Paris from 1916 to 1917, then to Tréboul in Brittany, where he died on March 17, 1918, at the age of 57 years.

In 1903, age 43, he was awarded the first Prix Goncourt for Enemy Force, his first novel. It tells the story of Phillipe Veuly, a poet, who awakens in an insane asylum. He does not know how he got there or why, but learns this in time. He becomes enamored of a female inmate who eventually leaves, he becomes inhabited by a being from another planet, is tortured by the 'doctors' of the establishment, escapes and travels the world in search of the female ex-patient. Darkly humorous and satirical, it is considered by many to be a forgotten masterpiece of science fiction.

It is said that he was called Gino by family and friends and thus his name—pronounced the same as J. Nau in French; and that it is a mixture of his American birth (John) and French heritage (Antoine); and that Nau means 'vessel' in Catalan, showing his love for the sea; and that it is in homage to the Haitian poet Ignace Nau; or all or none of the above.

Many of his works remained unedited at his death and are unpublished as of 2011.

== Prix Goncourt ==
In 1903 a group writers gathered in Paris (J. K. Huysmans, Octave Mirbeau, Léon Daudet, the brothers Rosny, Paul Marguerite, Lucien Desclaves, Élémir Bourges, Léon Hennique, Gustave Geffroy) and awarded Enemy Force the first Prix Goncourt (by a vote of 6 to 4). Edmond de Goncourt had stipulated in his will that they would award a prose work of imagination to distinguish and support a young literary debut full of promise. He rested in peace that first year. Nau was 43 years old. The author was almost completely unknown, except for a very few exotic stories in La Revue Blanche. He was living in Saint Tropez at the time and didn't even return to Paris to claim his prize money. His "outsider" status irked many a critic, but it only increased his status among the jury and other, younger writers. In 1906 Paul Léautaud: "The Prix Goncourt has really only been given once—the first time to Nau". And years later Huysmans would say, "It was the best one that we ever crowned."

== English translations ==
- Enemy Force (Adaptation and Introduction by Michael Shreve), Black Coat Press, 2010, ISBN 978-1-935558-49-1
- "The Emerald Eyes" (translated by Michael Shreve), InTranslation (The Brooklyn Rail), August, 2009.
- Jethro Bithell, ed. (1912). "The Blue Lagoon". Contemporary French poetry. Walter Scott publishing co., ltd. p. 97. "John Antoine Nau."

== Publications ==
- Au seuil de l'espoir—poetry (On the Threshold of Hope). Leon Vanier. 1897.
- 1903: Force ennemie—novel (Enemy Force, Adaptation and Introduction by Michael Shreve, Black Coat Press, 2010. ISBN 978-1-935558-49-1)
- 1904: Journal d'un écrivain, translation of Fyodor Dostoyevsky (A Writer's Diary)
- Hiers Bleus — poetry (Blue Yesterdays). Librairie Léon Vanier, éditeur, A. Messein. 1904.
- 1905: Le Prêteur d'amour—novel (The Love Lender)
- 1906: La Gennia—novel
- Vers la fée Viviane — poetry (Toward the Fairy Vivian). La Phalange. 1908.
- 1912: Cristobal le Poète—novel (Christobal the Poet)
- 1914: En suivant les goélands—poetry (Following the Seagulls)

Posthumous Publications:

- 1921: Thérèse Donati, moeurs corses—novel (Therese Donati, Corsican customs)
- 1923: Les Galanteries d'Anthime Budin—novel (The Gallantry of Anthime Budin)
- 1923: Pilotins—novel (Apprentice Pilots)
- 1923: Les Trois Amours de Benigno Reyes—stories (The Three Loves of Benigno Reyes)
- 1924: Poèmes triviaux et mystiques—poetry (Mundane and Mystical Poems)
- 1929: Archipel caraïbe—stories (Caribbean Archipelago)
- 1933 Lettres exotiques (Exotic Letters)
- 1949: Lettres écrites de Corse et de Bretagne (Letters written from Corsica and Brittany)
- 1972: Poésies antillaises. Illustrées par Henri Matisse (Antillean Poems)
