= Glinik, Podkarpackie Voivodeship =

Glinik
- Village
- Location within Poland
- Coordinates: 49°58′0″N 21°34′0″E
- Country: Poland
- Voivodeship: Subcarpathian
- County: Ropczyce-Sędziszów
- Gmina: Wielopole Skrzyńskie
- Time zone: UTC+1 (CET)
  - Summer (DST): UTC+2 (CEST)
- Vehicle registration: RRS

Glinik [ˈɡlinik] is a village in the administrative district of Gmina Wielopole Skrzyńskie, within Ropczyce-Sędziszów County, Subcarpathian Voivodeship, in south-eastern Poland.

Four Polish citizens were murdered by Nazi Germany in the village during World War II.
