= Emma Southwick Brinton =

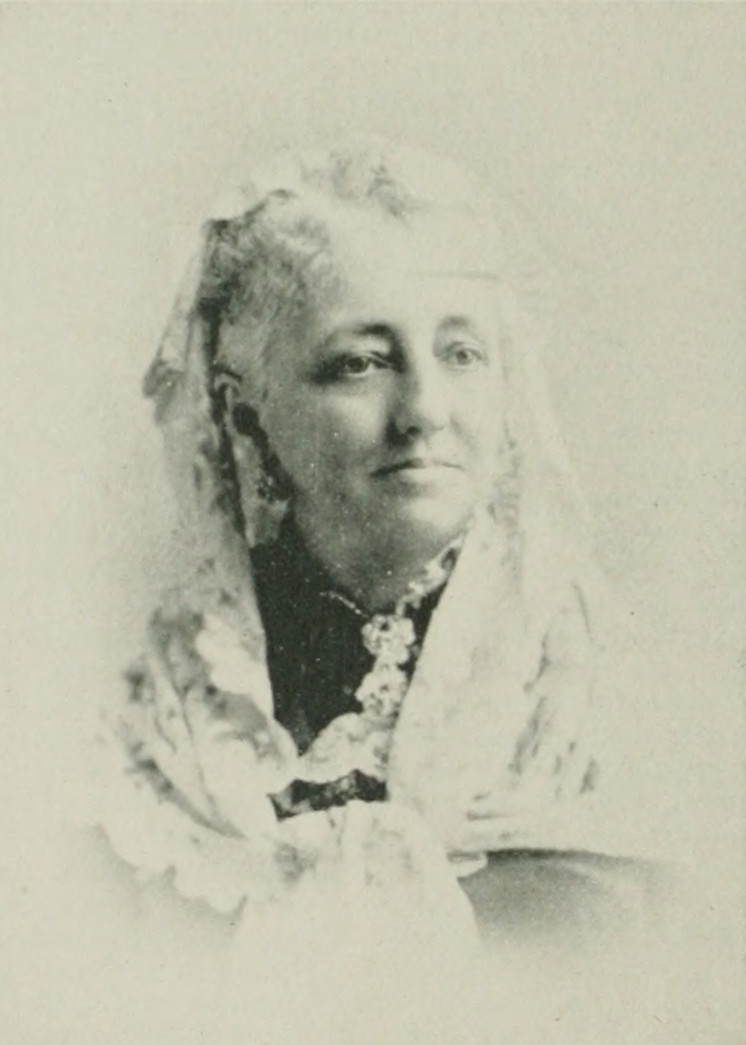
- Photo in A Woman of the Century
- Born: April 7, 1834; Peabody, Massachusetts, U.S.
- Died: February 25, 1922 (aged 87); Washington, D.C., U.S.
- Resting place: Arlington National Cemetery
- Occupations: army nurse, traveler, foreign correspondent
- Spouse: J. B. Brinton (m. 1880)

Emma Southwick Brinton (née, Southwick; April 7, 1834 – February 25, 1922) was an American Civil War army nurse, traveler, and foreign correspondent from Massachusetts. A descendant of early colonists, she began her public work by aiding soldiers after the Battle of Fort Sumter. She went on to serve as a nurse in various Civil War hospitals and in the field at places such as Fredericksburg and City Point. Brinton also worked as a foreign correspondent, visiting numerous countries in Europe and the Middle East, and as an active participant in philanthropic and social causes.

== Early years and education ==
Emma Dexter Southwick was born in Peabody, Massachusetts, April 7, 1834. (Note: FamilySearch records Brinton's date of birth as April 5, 1834.) She was a daughter of Philip R. and Amelia D. Southwick, and the oldest of seven children. Her ancestors, (Lawrence and Cassandra) were among the earliest colonists to the U.S. from England. Lawrence received a gift of land for the first tanning establishment in the settlement, near Salem, Massachusetts, on which he built the first house with glass windows. They were also the first in the Colonies to be persecuted for their belief, being Quakers, and for harboring a preacher. Brinton entered the activities of New England home life at an early age. She was educated in Bradford Academy (now, Bradford College).

== Career ==
When shots were fired during the Battle of Fort Sumter, Brinton was on the alert to aid those who were injured and by the collection of supplies for those who were marching to the relief of Washington D.C. Communicating with Dr. Samuel Gridley Howe, of the Sanitary Commission, who was then in Washington, he soon sent for her to join the corps of nurses in Mansion House Hospital, Alexandria, Virginia. A year was spent there. Then, after a rest at home, nearly another year was spent in Armory Square Hospital, Washington. Next came service in the field at Fredericksburg, White House Landing, and City Point, Virginia. At the last place, while fighting was going on around Richmond, with 35 tents full of wounded, with a constant call for food and care, scant water supply and great heat, with no shelter but a tent, where nearly all the food for her patients was provided, weeks passed into months, the overburdened nurse became a patient, and was sent to Washington and then home, broken down.

Quiet and rest prepared her for some years of active service in the Freedmen's work in Petersburg and the Sea Islands. Her next move in public work was as foreign correspondent for the Boston press, and in that capacity she visited nearly all the countries of Europe, spending a summer in Scandinavia and Russia, as well as a winter in Egypt and Palestine. In 1873, she spent several months in the Vienna Exhibition, where so much interest was shown by all other countries and so little by the United States, that she resolved to take some active part in the Centennial Exposition in 1876 in Philadelphia. Having been especially interested in the illustration of the home life of the peasantry of the various provinces of Austria, with their houses, gardens and costumes, she applied for permission to illustrate the ancient life of New England by a log cabin and its accessories. At the same time, she was invited by the State of Massachusetts to take partial charge of the office of the Centennial Commission in Boston, a position which she held a year. She then went to Philadelphia and spent six months in presenting to the multitude of visitors, inside her log house, a most interesting collection of furniture and domestic utensils, which ladies illustrated.

Bill H. R. 13074 was passed in the U.S. Congress in 1891 granting a pension of US$12 per month to Brinton for her service as a nurse during the Civil War.

== Personal life ==
In June, 1880, she married Dr. J. B. Brinton, of Philadelphia, and while there, was an active member of the New Century Club, the Woman's Christian Association and the Woman's Hospital Staff. She lived in a pleasant home with her mother in Washington, D. C., and was interested in the various activities of that city. She was a member of the Woman's National Press Association. An enthusiastic traveler, she spent her summers, with various parties of ladies under her chaperonage, in Europe.

Emma Southwick Brinton died February 25, 1922, in Washington, D.C., and is buried at Arlington National Cemetery in Arlington, Virginia.
