= Max O'Rell =

French journalist (1848–1903)

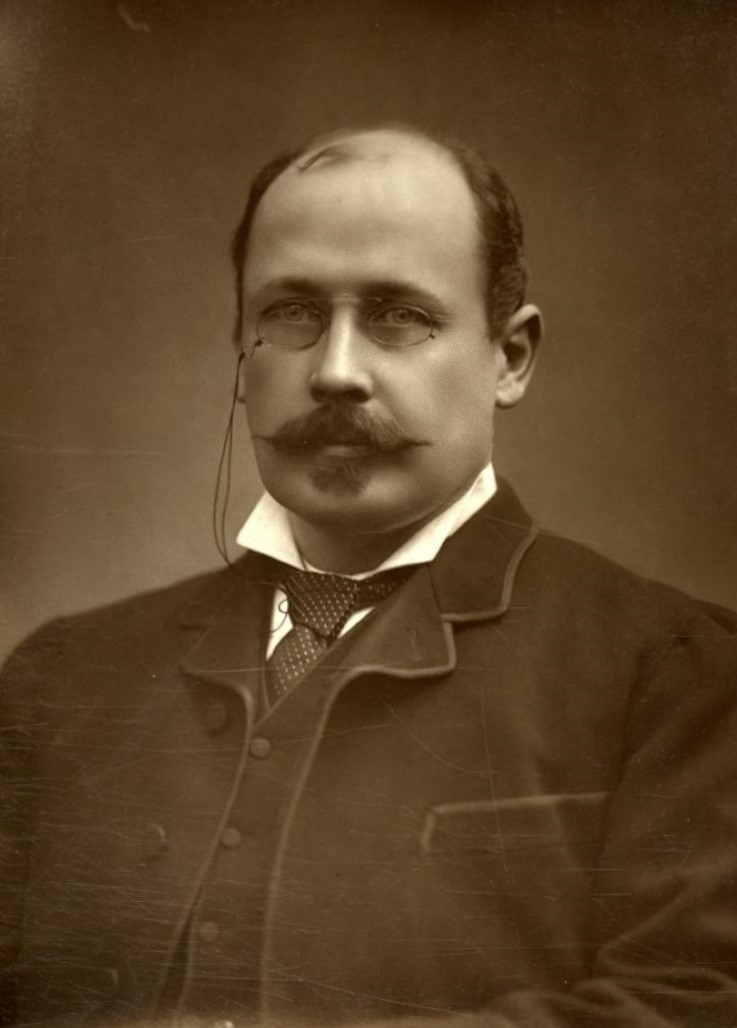
Léon Paul Blouet, pen name Max O'Rell, by Herbert Rose Barraud, c. 1890

Max O'Rell was the pen name of Léon Paul Blouet (3 March 1847 – 24 May 1903), French author and journalist.

== Early life ==
Max O'Rell was born Léon Pierre Blouet on 3 March 1847 in Avranches, a small town adjoining the Abbey of Mont St Michel in Normandy at the border with Brittany. He later preferred the name Léon Paul Blouet.

His paternal grandfather, Jean-François Blouet, was the warden of the prison of Mont St Michel from 1806 to 1818. He moved to Paris at the age of twelve where he attended the Conservatoire de Paris and the collège in Paris. He took a B.A. degree in 1865 and a BSc in 1866 at the Sorbonne. After 1866, he enrolled at the École Militaire, then based at Saint-Cyr-l'École. Passing out in 1869, he was commissioned as a lieutenant into the French artillery, spent five months in Algeria, and then after a short stay in the Versailles garrison was posted to fight in the Franco-Prussian War. He took part in the Battle of Wörth in August 1870 and was taken prisoner at Sedan. Once released, he was immediately employed against the Commune in Paris. On 14 April 1871, he was wounded, honourably discharged, and granted a small pension.

== Teacher and author in London ==
With little prospects in France, Blouet decided to become a journalist and left for London in 1872. In 1874 he obtained a post as senior master of French at the prestigious St Paul's London boys' school. Later that year, he married Mary Bartlett in Devonshire. Their daughter Léonie was born in 1875. At the beginning of the 1880s, Blouet started to prepare a book of sketches about England, probably inspired by Hippolyte Taine's Notes sur l'Angleterre. John Bull et son île was published in Paris by Calmann-Lévy in 1883 under the pseudonym Max O'Rell, which he had assumed to preserve the dignity of his teaching post. The book gives an overview of English customs, peculiarities and institutions, discussing very diverse aspects – from British colonial ambitions to the Anglo-Saxon concept of home. The French version became an instant success and went through at least fifty-seven editions within two years. It quickly found its way across the Channel. By December 1883, Max O'Rell, with the aid of his wife, had created an English version which eventually sold 275 000 copies in England, and 200 000 in the United States. The book was translated into seventeen languages. The success of John Bull and his Island encouraged Max O'Rell to continue producing collections of amusing anecdotes about morals and manners. John Bull's Womankind and Les Filles de John Bull were published in Paris, and over the next twenty years, O'Rell was to produce twelve more books, most of which were simultaneously published in Paris, London and New York.

== Lecturing ==
O'Rell resigned his teaching post at St Paul's and started a full-time career as an author and lecturer in 1885. Particularly in the United States, where he conducted seven lecturing tours, his success was phenomenal. He was considered the bestselling foreign lecturer of his time. His techniques on the lecture platform were inspired by Mark Twain, resulting in the nickname of the French Mark Twain. In 1894, O'Rell did a world lecture tour which brought him to the United States, Canada, Australia, New Zealand and South Africa over the period of almost two years. In March 1895 O'Rell engaged Mark Twain in a heated argument about French morals and the writer's inability to grasp the character of a nation in travelogues over several articles published in the North American Review. This feud was widely reported in the press worldwide and it was even hinted at a physical duel between Mark Twain and Max O'Rell.

== Theatre ==
O'Rell set to create an adaptation of Eugène Labiche's immensely successful comedy Le Voyage de M. Perrichon with the title On the Continong. Featuring him in the lead role, the play enjoyed reasonable success in industrial cities including Liverpool, Birmingham, Manchester and Glasgow from April to July 1897. Earlier attempts to stage his play The Price of Wealth in the United States were unsuccessful.

== Journalism ==
O'Rell had always considered himself a mediator between England, the United States and France and believed the press to be the most efficient tool to achieve a political rapprochement. Throughout his career, however, he was wary of journalists who thrived on nationalism and xenophobia, particularly in the context of Anglo-French relations. He acknowledged the great power of the daily press, compared to circulation of his books: "The Press alone […] has the power to destroy international prejudices. The writer, the lecturer, is read or heard by a few hundreds a day, the journalist is read by millions." (Advocate of Peace, March 1898, 58). At the height of the Zola-Dreyfus affair, O'Rell made a public statement in a letter to the London Chronicle, which was reprinted in several American newspapers, urging foreigners to abstain from showing sympathy for the Jewish officer. This was not because O'Rell considered Dreyfus to be guilty; as he wrote in the letter, he personally believed the French officer to be innocent. Rather, he argued that an overseas campaign in favour of Dreyfus would only result in anti-Semitism increasing in France. A notice in the Times shows that his advice was taken seriously. David Christie Murray, one of the leaders of the pro-Dreyfus movement in England, mentioned O'Rell's letter and announced a withdrawal of an appeal to French journalists, because it might offend the French amour-propre. At the height of the Fashoda crisis a short time later, the London Times published a letter by O'Rell to the editor in which he presented himself as a member of the Committee of the Entente Cordiale for the Better Relations between England and France and argued that despite the current tensions, the relations between Britain and France had a solid basis of respect and goodwill. He also commented on the Boer War, but his critical comments about Boers' brave resistance to the English Goliath led to a marked decline of his popularity in Britain.

When the Paris Figaro invited him to contribute a regular front page column, the news was widely circulated in the American media. However, O'Rell published only six front-page articles between 24 October 1901 and 4 February 1902, mostly containing amusing observations on American society.

== Final years ==
At the age of fifty, Max O'Rell had passed the zenith of his fame and professional success. He had succeeded in carving himself a niche in the Anglo-American media market as a connoisseur of the female world, playing on the widespread stereotype of the feminised Frenchman. He found that his humorous texts dealing with trans-cultural gender relations were particularly successful. His attempt at novel writing, an adaptation of his stage play The Price of Wealth proved to be a failure. Woman and Artist (1899), relating the conflict of a woman torn between her role as a wife and an aspiring artist was a very conventional story with one-dimensional characters. Although it was reviewed by leading American newspapers, their criticism of the banality of the work was unanimous.

His next three books Her Royal Highness Woman and his Majesty Cupid (1901), Between Ourselves: Some of the Little Problems of Life (1902) and Rambles in Womanland (1903) are mostly reworked versions of his lectures, containing many trivial anecdotes and aphorisms on the subject of women, love and marriage. Similar to his stereotyped depictions of national character, O'Rell presented ready-made clichés of gender relations. O'Rell continued to lecture in the United States, but he had to cut short his 1900 tour due to a severe stomach complaint. His next American trip one and a half years later even ended with an appendix operation in New York.

During this time, he started a relationship with a much younger Broadway actress, Beatrice Gresham, who started living with him. After returning from his final lecture tour in the United States in April 1902, O'Rell settled in Paris and continued acting as correspondent of the New York Journal.

He died on 24 May 1903 in his home in the 16th arrondissement at the age of 56. His death was widely reported in major American newspapers, whereas not all Parisian newspapers took note of it.

== Significance of Max O’Rell ==
Interest in Max O'Rell subsided quickly: apart from the French version of Between Ourselves, not many of his works were reprinted after his death. But the sales and audience figures during his lifetime as well as the sheer extent of his activities show that he was well known and that his opinions were taken into account in fin-de-siècle Western society. Having sold his books to hundreds of thousands of readers in many countries and given close to 2 600 lectures in his life, he was able to expose his views widely. To American and British audiences, O'Rell served as a reference for everything French and he made great efforts to affect the public discussion of political, social and cultural matters. He is of particular interest to cultural historians studying the presentation of gender roles.

== Bibliography ==
John Bull and his Island (John Bull et son île, 1883)

John Bull’s Womankind (Les Filles de John Bull, 1884)

The Dear Neighbours (Les Chers Voisins,1885)

Drat the Boys – John John Bull, junior, or, French as she is traduced. (Oh! Les Enfants, 1886)

Friend MacDonald (L’Ami MacDonald, 1887)

Jonathan and his Continent (Jonathan et son continent, 1889)

Jacques Bonhomme, John Bull on the Continent, From My Letter-box (1889)

Frenchman in America (Un Français en Amérique, 1891)

English Pharisees, French Crocodiles, and Other Anglo-French Typical Characters (1892)

John Bull & Co. – The Great Commercial Branches of the Firm: Canada, Australia, New Zealand and South Africa. (La Maison John Bull & Co, 1894)

Woman and Artist (Femme et Artiste, 1899)

Her Royal Highness Woman (Sa Majesté l’Amour. Petites études de psychologie humouristique, 1901)

Between Ourselves (Max O'Rell Confidentiel,1902)

Rambles in Womanland (1903)

== Sources ==
- Author and Book Info.com
