= The Lunar Trilogy =

Science fiction novel series by Jerzy Żuławski

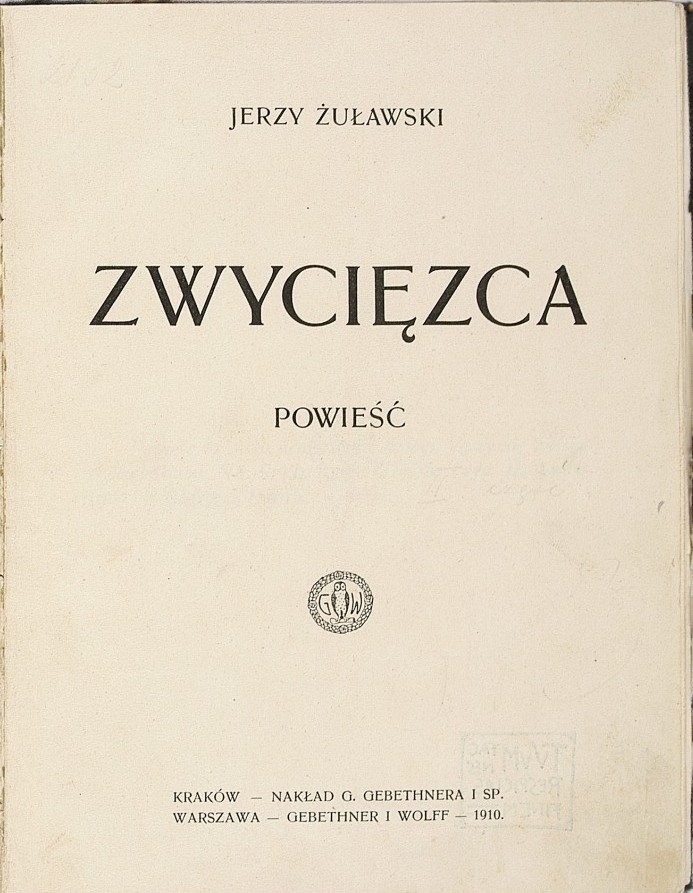
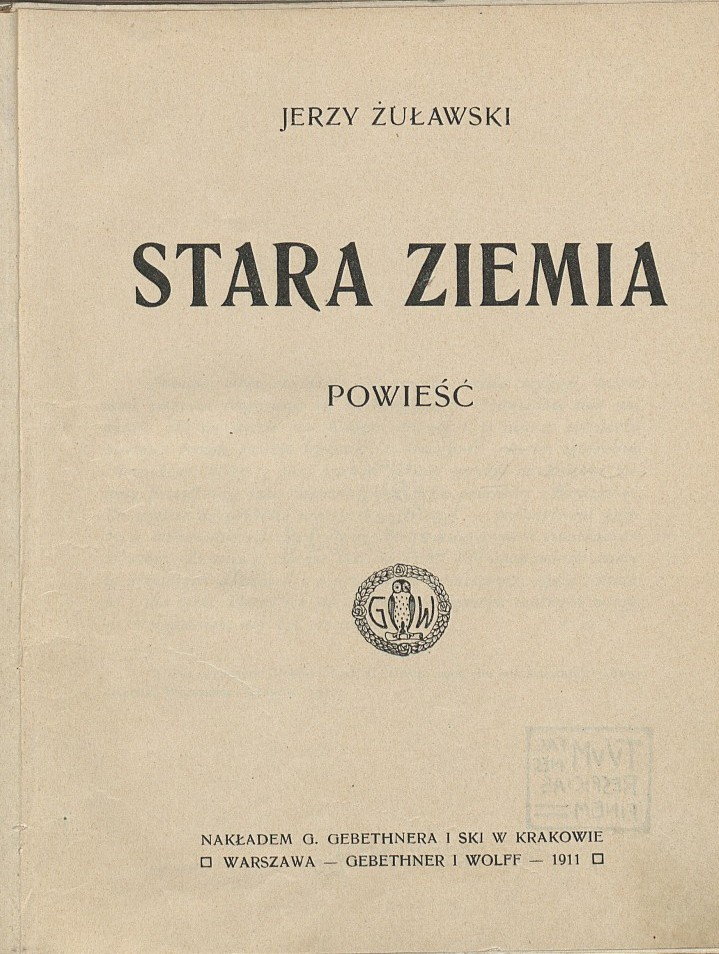
- Cover of the first volume, On the Silver Globe, 1903 Cover of the second volume, The Conqueror, 1910 Cover of the third volume, The Old Earth, 1911
- Author: Jerzy Żuławski
- Original title: Trylogia księżycowa
- Language: Polish
- Genre: Science fiction; philosophical fiction
- Publisher: S. Sadowski Publishing Company (On the Silver Globe); Gebethner i Wolff (The Conqueror and The Old Earth)
- Publication date: 1903 (On the Silver Globe); 1910 (The Conqueror); 1911 (The Old Earth)
- Publication place: Kingdom of Galicia and Lodomeria, Austria-Hungary
- OCLC: 1142222421

The Lunar Trilogy or The Moon Trilogy (Polish: Trylogia księżycowa) is a series of epic science fiction novels written by Polish philosopher Jerzy Żuławski between 1901 and 1911. It has been translated into Russian, Czech, German, English and Hungarian, and has been reprinted several times in Poland. The novels are Żuławski's best-known works.

The trilogy consists of On the Silver Globe: A Manuscript from the Moon (Polish: Na srebrnym globie. Rękopis z Księżyca), The Conqueror (Polish: Zwycięzca), and The Old Earth (Polish: Stara Ziemia). Written in Polish in the Kingdom of Galicia and Lodomeria (Austria-Hungary), the first volume was published in 1903 Lwów by S. Sadowski Publishing Company, while the later two were published in Kraków and Warsaw by Gebethner i Wolff in 1910 and 1911, respectively. In 1912, the novels were issued together as a three-volume set for the first time in Lwów. Żuławski's great-nephew, filmmaker Andrzej Żuławski, later adapted the first two books into a feature film, On the Silver Globe, which premiered in 1988.

Though now obscure outside Poland, The Lunar Trilogy is widely regarded as a foundational milestone in Polish science fiction and one of the earliest major works of the genre in Eastern Europe. Among its innovations, the first volume contains the earliest depiction of a lunar rover—an electrically powered, wheeled vehicle with an enclosed cabin. The Polish engineer Mieczysław G. Bekker, who later led the design of the Lunar Roving Vehicle for NASA's Apollo program, read the novel as a child and was inspired by its description of the lunar vehicle; this connection was later confirmed in correspondence between Bekker and Jerzy Żuławski's son, Juliusz Żuławski.

== Summary ==
The first volume, Na Srebrnym Globie (On the Silver Globe; first book edition: Lwów, 1903) describes, in the form of a diary, the story of a marooned expedition of Earth astronauts who find themselves stranded on the Moon and founded a colony there. After several generations, they lose most of their knowledge and are ruled by a religious cult. The second volume, Zwycięzca (The Conqueror or The Victor; first book edition: Warsaw, 1910), focuses upon the colonists' anticipated Messiah, another traveler from Earth. After initial success, he fails to meet their expectations and is killed in an allegory to the death of Jesus Christ. The third volume, Stara Ziemia (The Old Earth; first book edition: Warsaw, 1911). describes the visit of two Lunar colonists to 27th-century Earth.

=== Volume 1: Na Srebrnym Globie (On the Silver Globe) [first edition—Lwów, 1903] ===
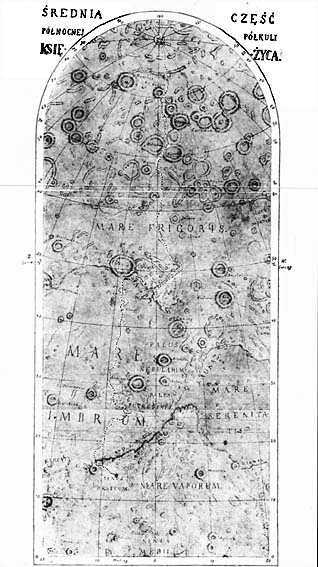
Map of the northern hemisphere of the Moon, from Na Srebrnym Globie

On the Silver Globe is the initial book of the trilogy, setting forth in first-person narrative the odyssey and subsequent tribulations of a disastrously miscalculated expedition to the Moon with four men and one woman. As part of the same mission, a second rocketship with two French voyagers, the brothers Remogner, is propelled towards the silver globe immediately afterwards. They, too, are lost, presumably after crashing upon the lunar surface.

The reader, however, is only privy to the circumstances surrounding the voyage of the first rocketship. At the very beginning of the narrative, the project's creator and leader, Irish astronomer O'Tamor, whom the readers of this chronicle never come to know, is dead as a result of the landing impact. Another member, English physician Tomasz (Thomas) Woodbell, succumbs to his injuries soon thereafter, leaving his fiancée Marta (Martha), a secret substitute for a German participant who backed out at the last minute, with the two remaining men, one of whom is Jan Korecki [yahn koh-RETZ-kee], the Polish narrator. The other voyager, and Korecki's rival for Marta, is the Brazilian-Portuguese engineer Piotr (Peter) Varadol.

There is no hope of return or rescue, but there is the possibility of survival on the other, Earth-like, though rugged and desolate, side of the Moon which has limited oxygen and water. After the first two chapters, Korecki's narrative focuses on the tormented relationship of Marta and Varadol as they produce the first generation of physically stunted children, with the narrator as the heartbroken, increasingly isolated observer and chronicler. The descendants of these space pioneers, whose initial generations are all the product of brother-sister incest, eventually populate the livable part of the planet, calling themselves Selenites. They create a religion based around the coming of a savior who will enable them to fulfill their destiny of someday returning to the planet of their ancestors, Earth.

Nearly half a century after his arrival, with Marta and Varadol gone, Korecki struggles towards the original landing site and, with his final effort, dispatches the chronicle we have read towards his home planet via the single message missile that was attached to the original rocketship for just such a purpose.

A brief "prologue" by an unnamed Earth observer, written as part of the plot, opens On the Silver Globe by reminiscing about the expedition fifty years after its departure, discussing the reaction of Earth's inhabitants to the presumed loss of the voyagers and then describing how Korecki's missile, aimed towards K... [likely meant to represent Kraków, where the story was written] observatory, is recovered by an assistant employed there. The charred pages contained within the missile are painstakingly transcribed by the assistant and subsequently presented for consideration by us, the readership of future Earth.

=== Volume 2: Zwycięzca (The Conqueror) [first edition—Warsaw, 1910] ===
The Conqueror, the longest and most complex of the three volumes, takes place centuries after the original voyage. It begins with the landing on the Moon of a rocketship, the first arrival from Earth since the two initial expeditions. The new space vehicle, built by scientist Jacek as a much-improved prototype for a projected but abandoned second series of lunar expeditions, bears a single, unauthorized passenger—Jacek's friend Marek (Mark), an adventurous young space technology planner, whom the physically and spiritually dwarfed Selenite humans hail as their long-awaited Savior. (Marek, knowing nothing of the Selenites' existence, had merely intended to investigate what happened to the original expedition, then return to Earth.)

The Selenites have developed a functioning but rudimentary and hierarchical agricultural society. They are losing a long struggle against domination by the Szerns (also spelled "Sherns"), the Moon's original inhabitants. The Szerns are telepathic, black-winged, devil-like beings who emerge from the Moon's deep caverns. They are highly intelligent and have organs that can produce electric discharges, similar to those of an electric eel. They rule the Selenites by force and demand tribute in produce, labour and offspring.

The Szerns also sexually assault Selenite women in order to breed human-Szern hybrids. A Szern grips a woman with the soft white tentacles concealed beneath its wings and delivers an electric shock, after which she conceives. The child, called a Deathling (mortes), is physically and intellectually diminished. Deathlings serve the Szerns with absolute loyalty. The Szerns treat them little better than animals and train them to persecute the Selenites. The Selenites despise the Deathlings even more than the Szerns, and a Selenite woman who becomes pregnant by a Szern is stoned to death.

Based on scraps of Christian teaching and stories passed down orally, the Selenites have developed their own belief system, the Religion of the Coming, centered around the hope that someone will come from Earth to rescue them from their fate. To this end, a religious order maintains a ceaseless vigil at the landing site of the original expedition. When Marek's ship touches down (Jacek had programmed the ship to arrive at the original landing site), he is clamorously received by an overjoyed crowd who are convinced that Marek is their Savior and will deliver them from the domination of the Szerns. Marek is brought to the Selenite capital to be received by the Head Priest, Malahuda. Rather than being overjoyed at Marek's arrival, the wise Malahuda is instead troubled, as he recognizes the potential for societal turmoil and realizes that the religion may not survive if its central founding prophecy is fulfilled. Faced with a choice of declaring Marek to be the messiah or declaring him to be a false messiah, Malahuda instead resigns his position, casts off his robes and enters into retirement.

Malahuda's granddaughter falls in love with Marek, while also being terrified by the sacrilegious nature of her feelings toward him. In turn, Marek - treated by the Selenites as a living god - merely considers her affections amusing and pays her little attention, treating her almost as a child. Fuelled by a wave of religious fervour, the Selenites storm the Szern stronghold that rules their territory (which Zulawski based on Warsaw Citadel, built in the 19th century to bolster imperial Russian control of occupied Poland). The Szern and Deathling forces are put to the sword, and only the mind-controlling, Lucifer-incarnate head Szern, Awij [AH-veey], escapes. The injured Awij hides in the Selenite temple but is captured by Malahuda's granddaughter. Marek resists the popular clamour for Awij's execution and instead imprisons him in the Temple's sacred crypt, hoping to return to Earth with him as proof of extraterrestrial life once his travails on the Moon are complete.

Spurred on by their success in conquering the Szern fortress, the Selenites mobilize a large armed force and, headed by Marek, stealthily cross a lunar sea by night to attack the Szern homeland. The Szerns are taken by surprise and are killed in their thousands, but strike back. As the war rumbles on and becomes more complex, religious unrest develops in the Selenite capital, with a leading member of the religious order publicly doubting Marek's status as the messiah and plotting to dethrone him in his absence. The new Head Priest, Sewin, becomes aware of this and decides to tolerate it so that if Marek fails or the public turns against him, there will be a reserve leader ready to take his place. Doubt and resentment grow further when Marek attempts to reorganize Selenite society along socialist lines, and when he proves unable to bring back to life those who have fallen in the conflict (Selenite religious teachings hold that their savior would be able to raise the dead). Still imprisoned the temple crypt, Awij uses his cunning and telepathy to convince Malahuda's granddaughter to release him. During his escape, he fatally electrocutes several Selenites, including Malahuda. But as the war is continuing to go well overall and the news from the front is good, the Selenites are largely indifferent to his escape.

Marek's forces are gradually thinning, and ammunition for the war with the Szerns is beginning to run short. As the Selenite forces advance into the depths of the Szern homeland, they encounter massive resistance and only take the capital with great difficulty. Awij (who has returned to the Szern capital) again evades capture, seemingly escaping through doors that are locked and barred, defying all reason. The city has unusual properties, and the Selenites are forced to abandon it again. Ultimately, after undergoing unspeakable psychological torment, Marek wins the battle of wills and temptation with Awij, thus ending the Szerns' evil reign. For Marek, however, it is a pyrrhic victory. As the only one who had the ability to conclusively defeat the Szerns, he is the hero of the lengthy war but, for the first time in the Selenites' memory, there is no new threat and he is now expected to fulfill his role as the Messiah. Having originally flown away to the Moon in the aftermath of an unhappy love affair, and having undergone another tragic romance with a Selenite woman, Marek is exhausted, both emotionally and psychologically.

Marek hears word of the discontent in the Selenite homeland and returns there alone, leaving his second-in-command in charge of the troops. When Marek reaches the Selenite homeland, he finds the population in open revolt at his attempted reforms, spurred on by the manipulative Sewin. Marek is also accused of having made a compact with the Szerns, and he is disavowed by a leading religious order who deny the Selenites' terrestrial origin and believe that they are native to the Moon. Facing overthrow, Marek decides to return to Earth in the ship, but finds it has gone. In the capital, he is forced to face the mounting wrath of the people. After all the sacrifices of the conflict, his hopes for a new society, based upon noble principles, are shattered by disunion in the ranks of the Selenites and their misplaced mystical faith in his status as the Savior. Unable to be the hoped-for Messiah in the crestfallen Selenites' ultimate desired destiny of Earth-quest, and failing to bring spiritual salvation, Marek achieves unintended messianic status when, in a fulfillment of Awij's dire predictions, he is sacrificed in a manner echoing the crucifixion of Jesus Christ.

=== Volume 3: Stara Ziemia (The Old Earth) [first edition—Warsaw, 1911] ===
The final installment, The Old Earth, opens in the period immediately following Marek's martyrdom, as the various Selenite factions, lacking the unifying locus of the struggle against the Szerns, turn upon each other, initiating a reign of chaos foreboding the end of society. Seeking refuge, two major subsidiary Selenite characters who provided philosophical commentary upon the events taking place in The Conqueror hide in Marek's still-usable spacecraft. They are subsequently able to auto-pilot it on its originally intended return voyage towards the now-27th century Earth, where they tour much of the world, finding themselves at the center of mysterious plots and machinations aimed at controlling the fate of humanity.

After a turbulent journey through space, the two Selenites land in the Sahara Desert in Egypt. They are both members of the Selenite religious order that believes their race is not descended from humans but originated on the Moon, and are referred to as the Master (the leader of the breakaway order) and the Disciple. Finding no evidence of human activity, they assume the Earth must be uninhabited (in line with their belief system), but after coming across a high-speed rail line (which links Egypt to Europe) then a sphinx, they become frightened and shelter overnight in a rock crevice. They are found the next day by a passing Arab trader, who cages them and brings them to Cairo, where he sells them to Mr. Benedictus, a wealthy elderly man who is following a singer, Aza, on her world tour. Benedictus dresses the two Selenites in children's clothing and puts them on a leash, and takes them to Aza's luxury hotel room to present them to her as a novelty gift. Fortunately for the Selenites, they are recognized by Aza's friend Jacek, the scientist who designed Marek's spaceship, who has also come to Cairo for the concert. Upon seeing them, Jacek guesses their lunar origin and is able to communicate with them in Polish. After the concert (where the audience is much more enamored by Aza's looks and sexual attributes than her musicality), he and the two Selenites fly back to Warsaw - a city in the communist United States of Europe (U.S.E.), where Jacek is now the chief scientist in charge of telecommunications. When Jacek asks the two Selenites how they came to be in possession of Marek's ship, the Master lies and tells Jacek that Marek sent them to Earth in his ship to get help. The Disciple disapproves of this but does not contradict him.

Far from achieving its stated goals of equality, communism in the U.S.E. has resulted in the establishment of a rigid class hierarchy in which a small managerial elite enjoys great privilege while the general working population is poorly paid and kept down by the repressive machinery of the state. A liberal revolution is fomenting, and Jacek has discovered a technology that causes individual atoms to explode, releasing vast amounts of destructive energy. Both the communist government and the liberal revolutionaries want to acquire the technology. Although Jacek is part of the wealthy elite, his sympathies are with the revolutionaries - but the authoritarian Master steals the technology and gives it to the communist government. The government issues a communiqué stating that if revolution breaks out, it will activate the weapon and destroy the entire continent rather than relinquish power. The putative revolution collapses, and the government bans all scientific research and abolishes the teaching of science.

Back on the Moon, the Szern leadership has similarly abolished all scientific research and tuition among the Szerns, and has even gone one step further by prohibiting the writing of books. The Grand Szern alone has the right to place his thoughts on record. Thus the trilogy ends with anti-intellectual authoritarian regimes consolidating their hold on power both on Earth (in the United States of Europe) and on the Moon (in the Szern homeland).

== Interpretations ==
Żuławski was likely influenced by H. G. Wells and Jules Verne. His work is seen as a major milestone in the development of science fiction and fantasy in Poland, gaining great popularity and having been well received by critics since. Atkinson has called the trilogy the second most famous work of Eastern European sci-fi after the works of Stanisław Lem. Jasińska-Wojtkowska and Dybciak note that it was the first well developed Polish work of science-fiction, and would not be surpassed till the works of Lem few decades later.

It has been described as Żuławski's take on the philosophy of history and interpreted as a critique of a socialist, egalitarian utopia. Żuławski's story shows the unpredictability of human nature as victorious over the concepts of utilitarianism and social regulation. He is critical of religion, arguing that they are a social construct that can have destructive influence on humanity. He is also concerned with the political uses of scientific knowledge, and is critical of the pursuit of "pure science", and is also critical of the notion of technological progress, which Żuławski sees as leading to greater conflict and inequality. Instead, Żuławski argues, the humanity should focus on the moral progress. The work has been described as "poetic and tragic", combining "scientific fantasy with skeptical reflection", and an anti-utopian vision of humanity's future. It has been classified as a social utopia-type science fiction or simply a dystopia.

== Adaptation ==
Director Andrzej Żuławski, who is Jerzy Żuławski's great-nephew, attempted to adapt the trilogy into a film in the late 1970s. After about three-quarters of the movie had been completed, Poland's Ministry of Culture shut down the production, ordering that the unedited film and all related materials be destroyed. They were preserved in spite of this directive, and when the Communist government's power began to decline in the late 1980s, Żuławski was persuaded to edit the existing footage into movie form. He did shoot some new footage, but solely in order to provide a bridge between the scenes that had been filmed previously. He did not intend that the film be shown commercially. On the Silver Globe premiered at the 1988 Cannes Film Festival. Despite its title, the film adapts the whole trilogy.
