= Force ennemie =

1903 novel by John Antoine Nau

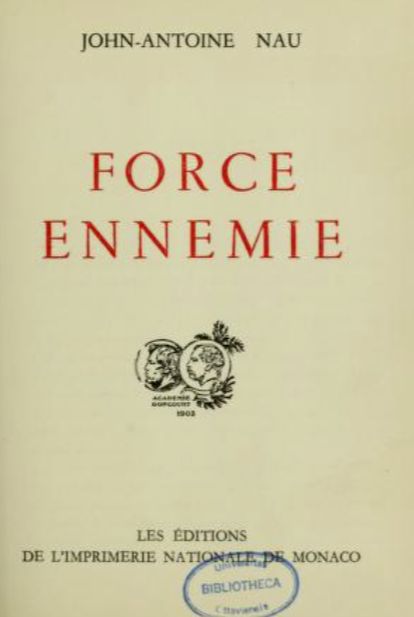
- Title page for Force ennemie (1903)
- Author: John Antoine Nau
- Language: French
- Genre: Science fiction
- Publication date: 1903
- Publication place: France
- Media type: Print
- Awards: Prix Goncourt

Force ennemie (1903; English: Enemy Force) is a novel by French author John Antoine Nau. It won the inaugural Prix Goncourt in 1903. The novel describes life inside an asylum and gives insight into the insane mind.

== Plot summary ==
The main character is a poet who mysteriously wakes up in a rubber room, locked away in a lunatic asylum, apparently at the request of a relative, due to alcoholism or perhaps jealousy. He becomes possessed by an "alien force" from another planet, Kmôhoûn, whose crazy voice is constantly screaming in his head. He then falls in love with a female inmate, Irene, but she leaves, and so he follows her to the ends of the earth, while the alien force cohabits his body.

== Critical reception ==
Force ennemie was reviewed in The Journal of Mental Science by British physician Havelock Ellis, who stated that the novel is a "vivid description of life inside an asylum", and that the novel provides "extraordinary insight" into an insane mind. He added that the book is not a criticism of asylums.

The novel won the inaugural Prix Goncourt in 1903. Paul Léautaud's Le Petit Ami was a close second. Académie Goncourt members later privately regretted their choice. Nevertheless, the president of the academy, Joris-Karl Huysmans, defended the decision, saying, "Force ennemie is still the best we have crowned". The situation rankled Léautaud, who refused to write another novel for consideration by the academy, dismissing the award: "The Prix Goncourt has really only been given once—the first time to Nau".

== Translations ==
In 2010, Michael Shreve translated the book into English as Enemy Force.

== See also ==
- One Flew Over the Cuckoo's Nest
