= János Kemény (writer) =

Hungarian writer, theater director and dramatist

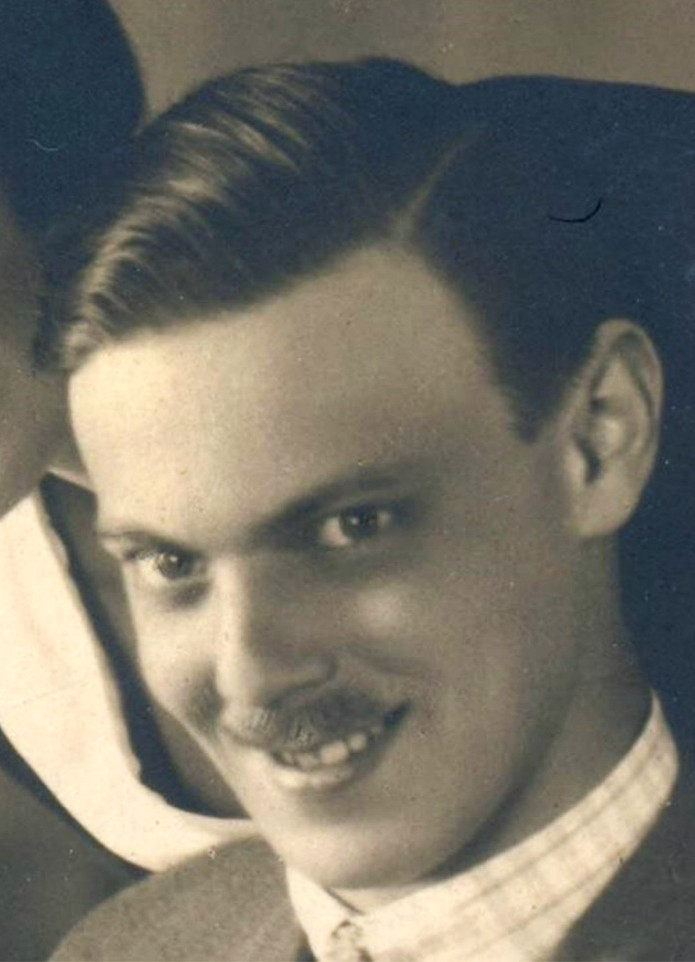
János Kemény

Baron János Kemény (5 September 1903 – 13 October 1971) was a Hungarian writer, theater director, dramatist, and founder of the Marosvécs/Brâncoveneşti Helikon community.

== Lifetime ==
János Kemény was born in Pittsburgh, Pennsylvania. His mother, the actress Ida Berenice Mitchell (1871-1956), lost her husband, István Kemény, shortly after János was born and could not afford to support her four children. She therefore moved from the United States to her grandfather's house in Transylvania, Hungary in 1904. János attended the Reformed College (denominational high school) in Kolozsvár (today Cluj-Napoca, Romania), and then enrolled in the fall of 1921 at the College of Land Cultivation in Vienna. He was married in 1923 to a woman of Scottish-Greek origin, Augusta Paton, daughter of William Roger Paton, and they had six children.

In 1926, János Kemény and Aladár Kuncz organized a literary conference of Transylvanian Hungarians at Kemény's estate in Brâncoveneşti, Mureş (Marosvécs) County. This led to the formation of the Helikon community, which from 1928 published the influential Hungarian literary periodical Erdélyi Helikon. In 1930, Kemény was awarded the Corvin Wreath by the Hungarian Government.

For ten years from 1931, he headed the Hungarian Thália Theater in Kolozsvár/Cluj and also published literary work. Then from 1945 to 1952 he was among the founding organizers of the Székely theatre in Târgu Mureş (Marosvásárhely). However, he was obliged to do manual work in the communist period, before later finding a job in the library of Târgu Mureş (Marosvásárhely) art college and working on the Hungarian-language magazine Új Élet in the same city. A succession of his works appeared between 1957 and his death, in Târgu Mureş, in 1971, but he managed to complete only one volume of a planned autobiography.

== Death ==
He died of lung cancer in 1971 at the age of 68. He is buried in the park of the castle in Marosvec, under the heliconian oaks. His wife, Augusta, died on 27 July 1989. She is buried next to him in Marosvec.

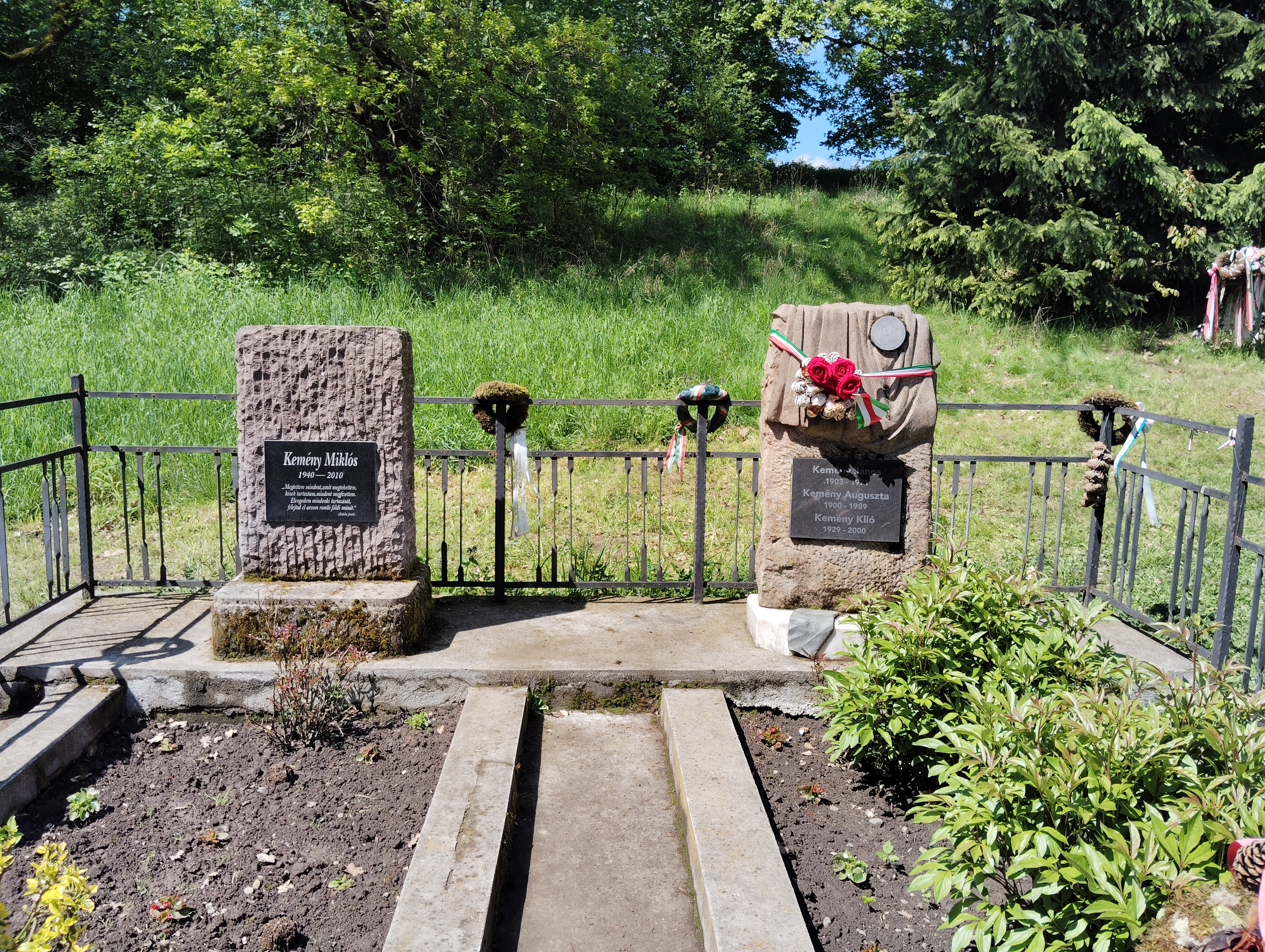
His grave in the park of the Marosvécs Castle

== Selected works ==
- His first writing "Emlékezetem" (Cluj, 1921) (My memories)
- Kutyakomédia (Poor Comedy, Cluj, 1934)
