= Juliusz Żuławski =

Juliusz Żuławski (7 October 1910 in Zakopane – 10 January 1999 in Warsaw) was a Polish poet, prose writer, literary critic and translator. He was an editor of Nowa Kultura (1950–1951), chairman of Polish PEN Club (during the years of 1978–1983 and 1988–1991), member of Stowarzyszenie Pisarzy Polskich. He fought during Polish September Campaign (1939).

== Early life ==
He is the son of Kazimiera Żuławska and Jerzy Żuławski.

== Work ==
Juliusz Żuławski made his own debut as writer in 1933 by Marcin poem published on Droga, a monthly magazine.

He was an author of reflective and memoirs lyric poetry (Pole widzenia, 1948), psychological prose (Wyprawa o zmierzchu, 1936; Czas przeszły niedokonany, 1962), biographical stories (Byron nieupozowany, 1964). He has translated English poetry. For example he translated and published a book containing many Robert Browning's poems. He was one of three editors of the largest anthology of British and American poetry in Poland, Poeci języka angielskiego that was published in three volumes from 1969 to 1974. He also published several related to Tatra Mountains.

== Notable works ==
- Wyprawa o zmierzchu (1936)
- Cień Alcybiadesa (Neubrandenburg, 1943)
- Skrzydło Dedala (1949)
- Czas przeszły niedokonany (1962)
- Pole widzenia (1948)
- Wiersze z notatnika (1957)
- Kartki z drogi (1975)
- Byron nieupozowany (1964)
- Wielka podróż Walta Whitmana (1971)
- Czas odzyskany (1982)
- Przydługa teraźniejszość (1992)
