= Lavilla Esther Allen =

North American author and poet (1834–1903)

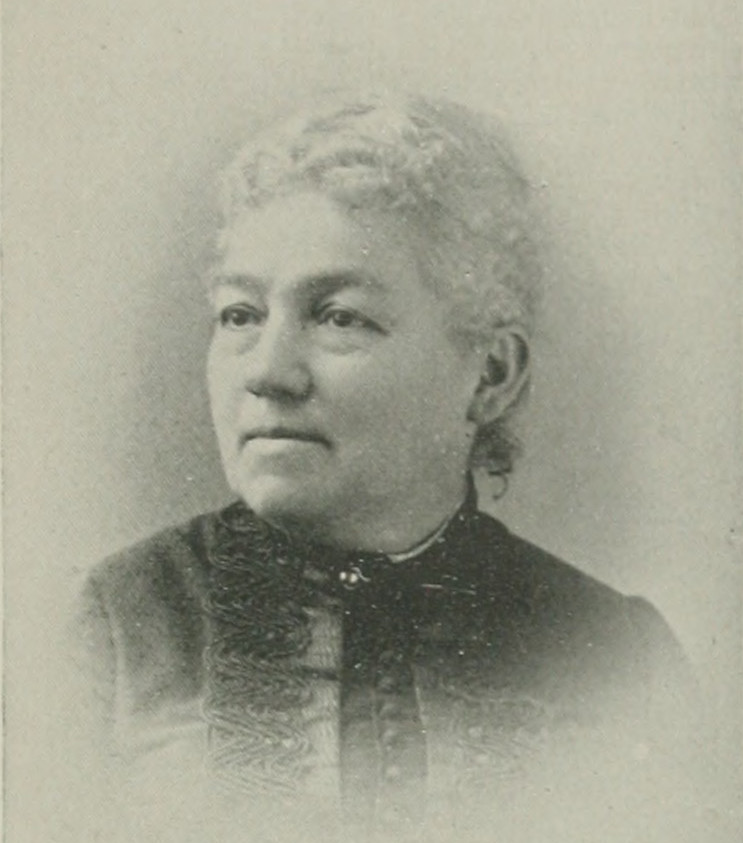
- Photo in A Woman of the Century
- Born: Lavilla Esther Ostrander; May 28, 1834; Ithaca, New York, U.S.
- Died: November 11, 1903 (aged 69); Chicago, Illinois, U.S.
- Resting place: Oak Grove Cemetery, Hillsdale, Michigan
- Occupations: author, poet, reader
- Spouse: William Schuyler Allen (m. 1851)
- Writing career
- Language: English

Signature
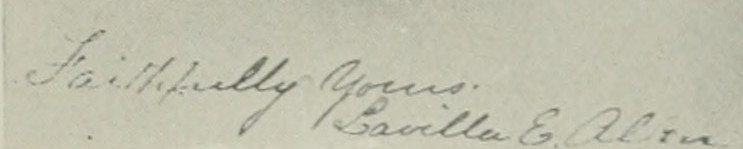

Lavilla Esther Allen (née Ostrander; also known as Esther Lavilla Allen; May 28, 1834 – November 11, 1903) was an American author, poet, and reader from New York. She moved to Michigan as a child, where she was educated and began writing verses in her youth. After beginning her literary career in earnest in 1870, she contributed stories, sketches, and poems to numerous periodicals. Allen also worked as a public reader, and her published works often focused on temperance and missionary themes.

== Early life and education ==
Lavilla Esther Ostrander was born in Ithaca, New York, on May 28, 1834. As a child, she moved with her parents to Ypsilanti, Michigan, where she spent most of her childhood. She was educated in the seminary of that town. She wrote verses in her youth.

== Career ==
She began her literary career in earnest in 1870, writing stories, sketches and poems for publication, which were widely copied. She contributed to the Ladies' Repository, the Masonic Magazine, the Chicago Interior, the Advance, the Northwestern Christian Advocate, and other prominent periodicals. Much of her work was devoted to temperance and missionary lines, but she also wrote numerous poems for various occasions. Besides her work as a writer, she was a respected reader, often reading her poetical productions in public, mainly before college societies.

Allen experienced a high degree of success with her first book of poems before writing volumes of missionary and temperance literature, and hundreds of verses upon various subjects at the request of friends. Her works were characterized by high ideals of life, by sincere and noble pursuits, and a pervading purity. She was also interested in missionary, Sunday school, and educational work, as well as charitable and reformatory enterprises.

== Personal life ==
In 1851, she married William Schuyler Allen and lived in Hillsdale, Michigan.

Lavilla Allen died in Chicago, Illinois, on November 11, 1903, and was buried in Hillsdale, Michigan.

== Selected works ==
- Aunt Betsy's Pumpkin Pie and other poems, 1878.
