= Iwona Woicka-Żuławska =

Polish diplomat

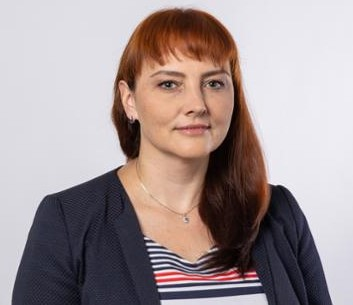

Poland Ambassador to Norway
- In office 15 March 2018 – 31 October 2023
- Appointed by: Andrzej Duda
- King: Harald V
- Preceded by: Stefan Czmur
- Succeeded by: Małgorzata Kosiura-Kaźmierska

Personal details
- Born: 1972 (age 53–54) Kraków
- Education: University of Warsaw
- Profession: Diplomat

Iwona Liliana Woicka-Żuławska (born 1972 in Kraków) is a Polish civil servant and diplomat, between 2018 and 2023 serving as an ambassador to Norway.

== Life ==
Woicka-Żuławska has graduated from economics at the University of Warsaw. In 2008, she defended her doctorate at the SGH Warsaw School of Economics.

In 1997, she began her career at the Office of the Committee for European Integration of Poland, being responsible for negotiations of Polish accession to the European Union in the sphere of provision of services and information society. Since 2010, she was working at Foreign Policy Planning Department, Ministry of Foreign Affairs as a councillor for internal market and global socio-economic processes. Between September 2010 and mid 2014 she was head of the economic unit at the embassy in London. Afterwards, she was deputy director at the MFA Department of Economic Cooperation, in charge of energy issues, cooperation with international economic organizations, and expansion on African and Latin American markets. In 2016, she became director of the Department.

In January 2018 Woicka-Żuławska was nominated Poland ambassador to Norway. She presented her letter of credence to the King Harald V of Norway on 15 March 2018. She ended her term on 31 October 2023.

Woicka-Żuławska is married. Besides Polish, she speaks English, Spanish, Italian, and French.
