= Wawrzyniec Żuławski =

Polish alpinist, music critic, composer, educator

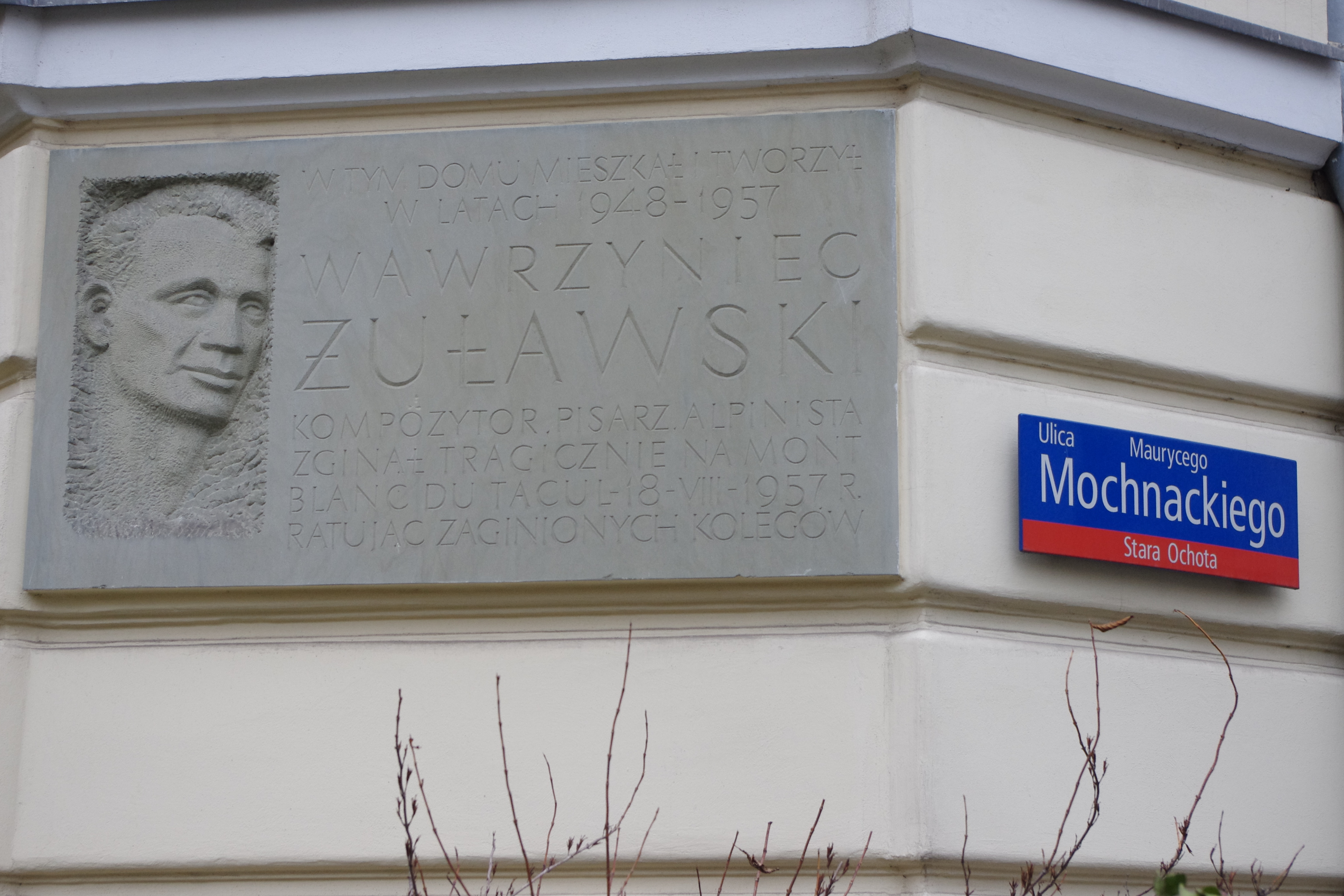

Wawrzyniec Jerzy Żuławski (14 February 1916, in Zakopane – 18 August 1957, in the Alps), also known as Wawa, was a Polish alpinist, educator, composer, music critic, and musicologist. He was a professor of Państwowa Wyższa Szkoła Muzyczna in Warsaw. Żuławski was an initiator and organiser of Polish alpinism. During World War II he was a member of Armia Krajowa and was a soldier during the Warsaw Uprising.

Żuławski published music reviews in Ruch Muzyczny, Express Wieczorny, Nowa Kultura. He also composed orchestral, chamber, piano and vocal pieces.

He was one of the leading Polish alpinists. He died on Mont Blanc during a rescue action in 1957.

== Notable works ==
=== Compositions ===
- Cztery kolędy polskie, orchestral compositions, 1947
- Wierchowe nuty, vocal compositions for choir and violin solo, 1955

=== Books ===
Żuławski was an author of several mountain-related books:

- Niebieski krzyż, 1946
- Sygnały ze skalnych ścian, 1954
- Tragedie tatrzańskie, 1956
- Skalne lato, 1957
