= Kazimiera Żuławska =

Polish romanist

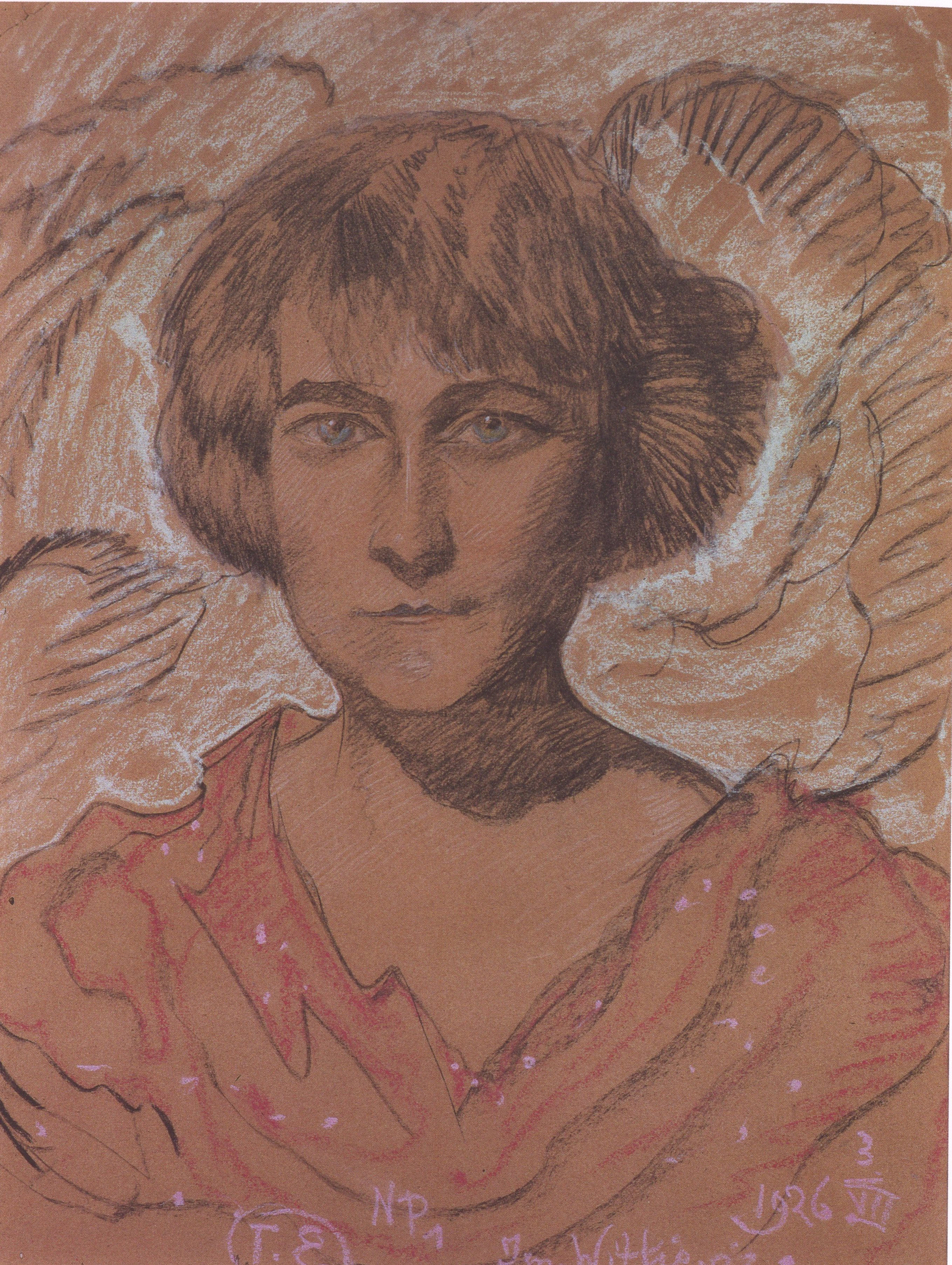
Kazimiera Żuławska

Kazimiera Żuławska née Hanicki (22 February 1883 – 18 April 1971) was a Romanist, translator, mountaineer, and women's rights activist.

== Biography ==
She was born Kazimiera Hanicki in Czemerysy to a landed gentry family, daughter of Ignacy Dionizy Hanicki and Zofia née Ostolska. She graduated from the 2nd Warsaw Girls' Gymnasium, receiving a silver medal in 1900 and qualification as a home teacher. She studied Romance studies at the universities in Lviv and Bern. In the latter, in 1910, she obtained a doctorate for her thesis "Women in the Woltera Theater".

She married the writer Jerzy Żuławski on 22 June 1907. With her husband and his brother Janusz, she climbed the Alps and the Tatra Mountains. In the years 1910–1921 she lived in Zakopane. After the outbreak of World War I, Jerzy Żuławski joined the Legions, and Kazimiera was the chairman of the Zakopane section of the Women's League of Galicia and Silesia (1915–1918). After her husband's death in 1915, she became the secretary of Kazimierz Tetmajer. The Żuławski House - "Łada" at ul. Chałubińskiego [3] - it was a meeting center for the Zakopane bohemians Witkacy, Kazimierz Przerwa-Tetmajer, Jan Kasprowicz, Tymon Niesiołowski, Bronisław Malinowski. In order to obtain funds for herself and her children, she also ran a guest house and a bakery in "Lada".

In independent Poland, she left for Toruń with her sons, running the "Zofiówka" guesthouse at ul. Bydgoska 26. where her friends from Zakopane also visited. Including frequented here Stanislaw Przybyszewski, Tymon Niesiołowski, Charles Zawodziński, Stanislaw Ignacy Witkiewicz, Juliusz Osterwa. In those years she was in a relationship with the composer and violinist Marceli Feliks Popławski. After moving to Warsaw, she worked as a clerk of the Social Insurance Institution. She was also a translator of French and Spanish literature and mountaineering books. At the end of the 1920s, she returned to the Polish Women's League.

During World War II, she hid Jews in her apartment, whom she helped to obtain false documents and find employment. For her heroism, together with her son Wawrzyniec, she was posthumously honored by Yad Vashem in 1981 with the title "Righteous Among the Nations".

In Warsaw, she lived until her death, changing addresses. She still ran an open house, and was an artist. She continued to translate into Polish, including the drama "Judyta" by Charles de Peyret-Chappuis, staged by Kazimierz Dejmek at the New Theatre, Łódź (10 September 1960), and then at the Television Theater directed by Stanisław Wohl (1960) and Irena Babel (1974). After her retirement, she was supported by her sons - Marek, an artist-painter living in exile in London, Juliusz, a writer and long-time president of the Pen Club, and the youngest Wawrzyniec, (musicologist and composer). All Żuławskis inherited from her passion for climbing and mountaineering. She was buried in the Powązki cemetery (section R, row 4, place 21: Tadeusz Ostolski, inv. 14884).
