= Faculty of Archaeology, University of Warsaw =

Coordinates: 52°14′23″N 21°1′12″E

- Wydział Archeologii Uniwersytetu Warszawskiego (WAUW)
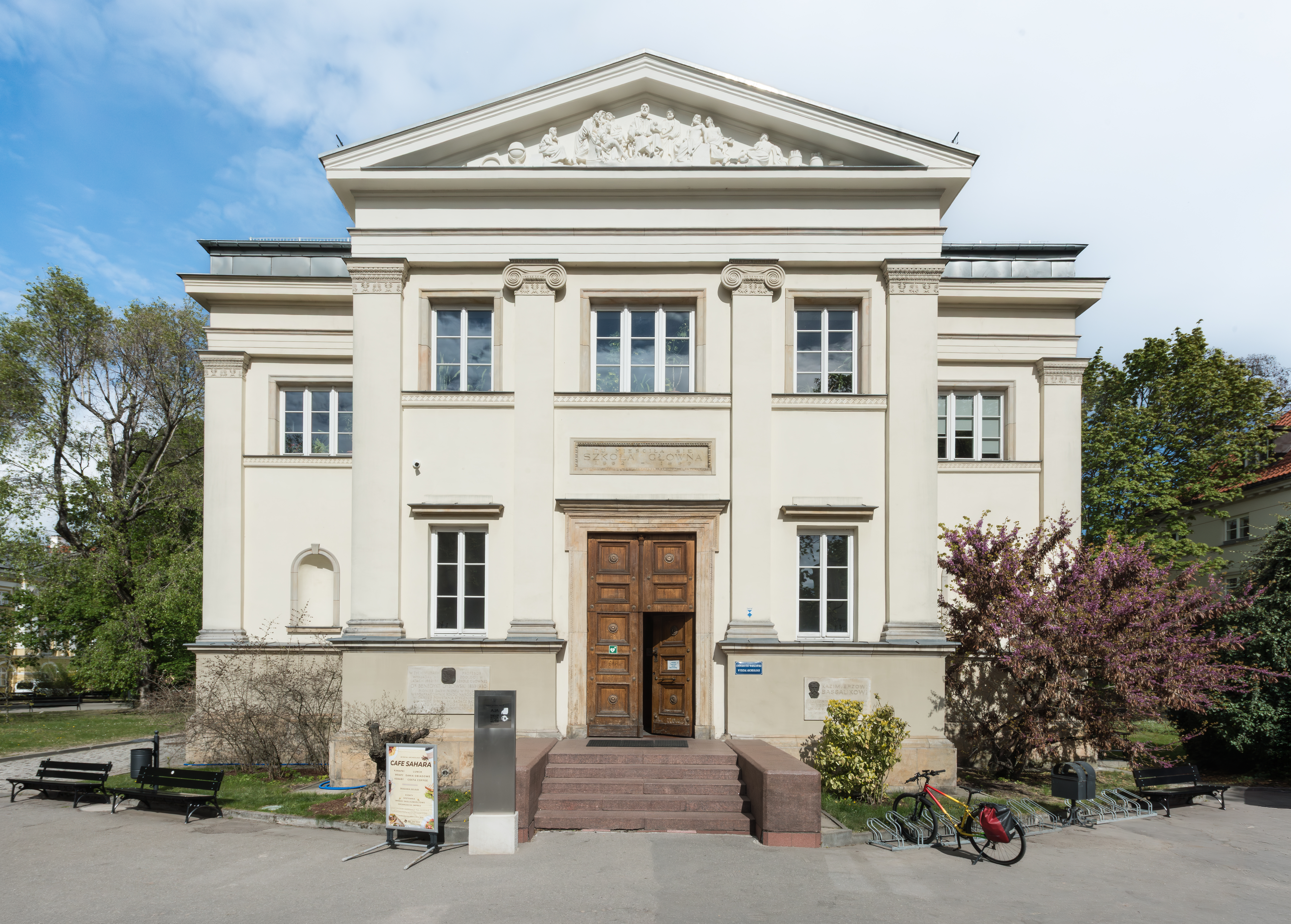
- Established: 1975 (Institute of Archaeology); 2020 (Faculty of Archaeology)
- Parent institution: University of Warsaw
- Dean: prof. Bartosz Kontny
- Academic staff: 100
- Students: 1500
- Location: Krakowskie Przedmieście 26/28, 00–927 Warsaw, PL
- Website: https://www.archeologia.uw.edu.pl

University rankings

Global – Overall
- QS World: 51–100 (2023)

Faculty of Archaeology, University of Warsaw (WAUW) is a faculty of the University of Warsaw, established on 1 September 2020, through the transformation of the Institute of Archaeology, which operated as part of the now-defunct Faculty of History. The Faculty is based in the Szkoła Główna Warszawska building. It is the largest archaeological institution in Poland, comprises 17 departments and 7 laboratories with a staff of about 100. The Faculty provides education in various branches of modern archaeology and related sciences to over 1500 students from various fields of study: Ancient Egypt, Ancient America, Classical Archaeology, and Ancient Near East. The Archaeology program at the University of Warsaw is placed between 51st and 100th worldwide in Quacquarelli Symonds World University Ranking (QS)

== Archaeological works and main discoveries ==
Archaeologists from Faculty of Archaeology University of Warsaw have conducted archaeological works at numerous sites in Poland, Egypt, Sudan, Syria, Bulgaria, Ukraine, Denmark, Sicily, Greece, Libya, Sultanate of Oman, Kuwait, Turkmenistan, Uzbekistan, Armenia, Georgia, Peru, and El Salvador

The most outstanding discoveries:

- Europe
  - Novae (fortress)
- Egyptology
  - Mortuary temple of Hatshepsut (together with Polish Centre of Mediterranean Archaeology University of Warsaw)
  - Christian cathedral in Faras, Sudan
  - West Saqqara - necropolis adjacent to Djoser Pyramid.
  - Tell Atrib
- Near Eastern Archaeology
  - Palmyra
  - Tell Arbid
  - Ptolemais, Cyrenaica
  - Tell Qaramel
- South America
  - El Castillo de Huarmey
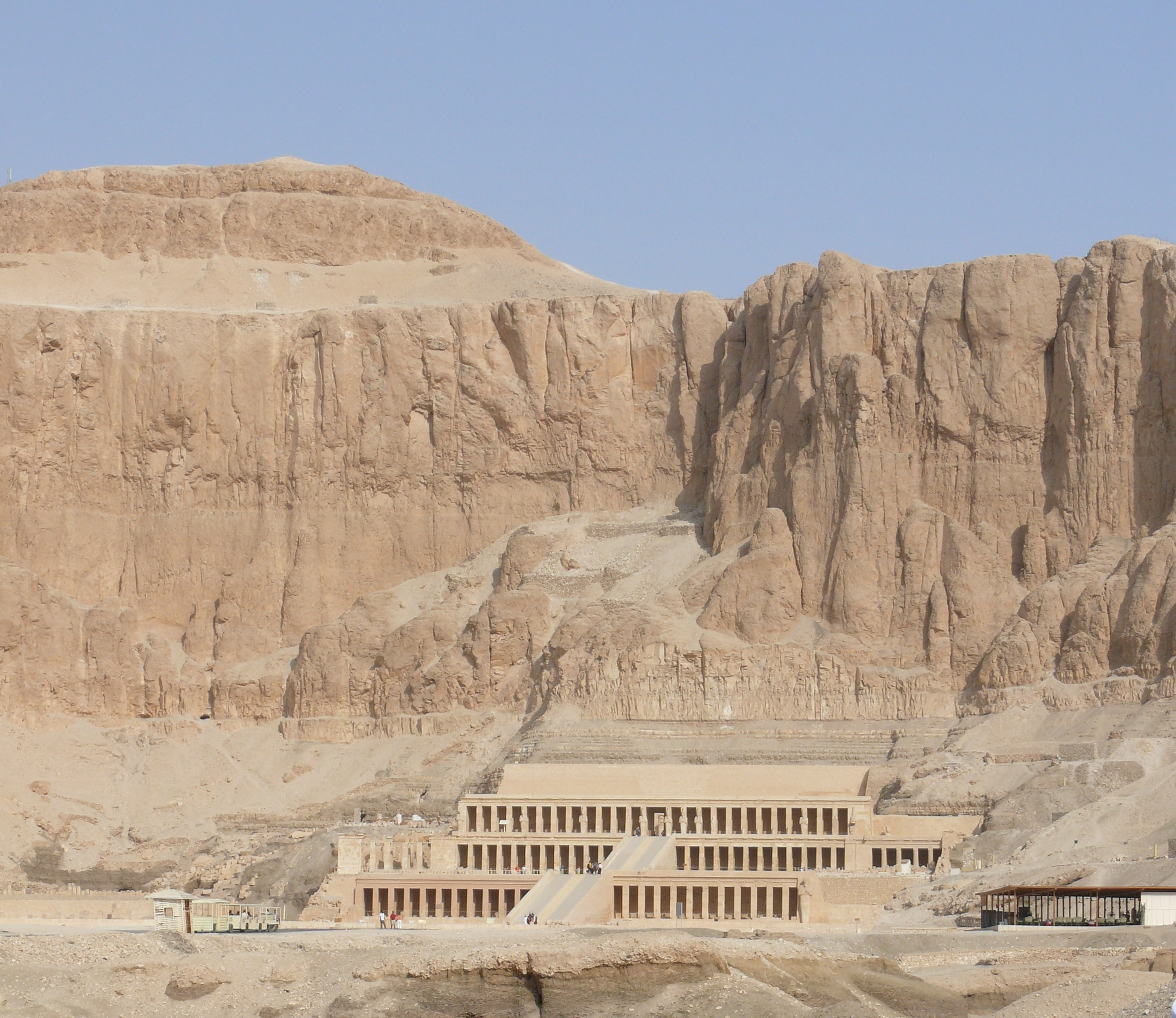
Mortuary temple of Hatshepsut

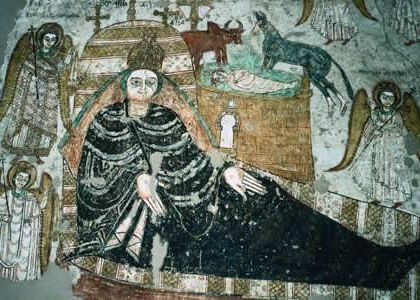
The Birth of Jesus - fresco in the Cathedral of Faras(Sudan National Museum in Khartoum

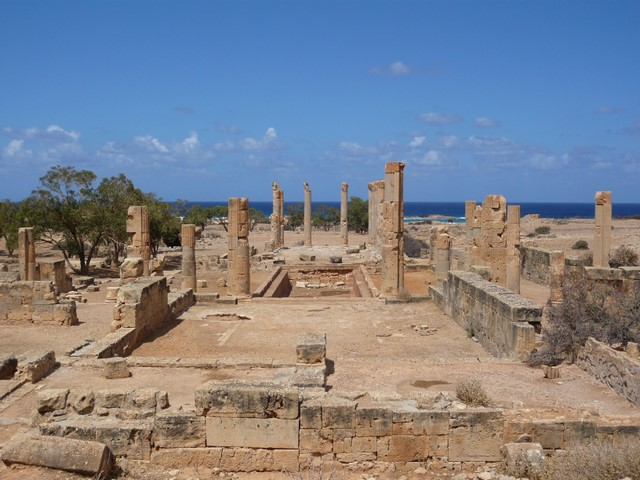
Villa of Columns, Ptolemais, Cyrenaica

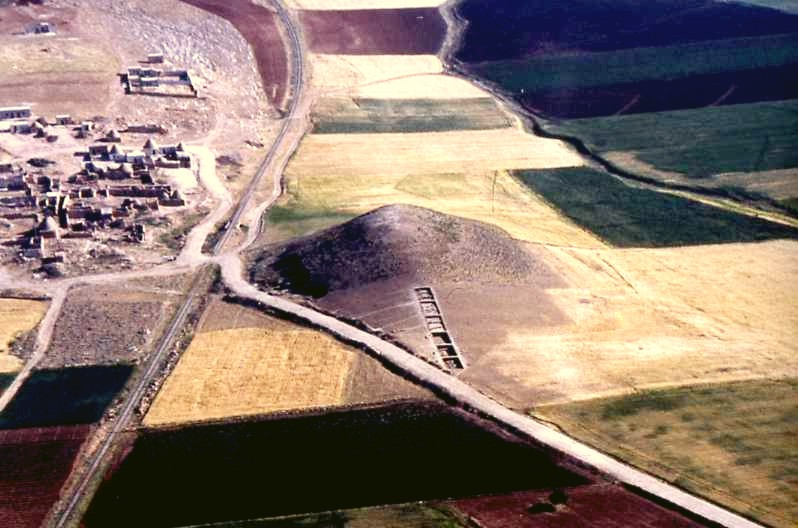
Aerial view of Tell Qaramel

== Notable archaeologists ==
- Egyptology: Kazimierz Michałowski, Tadeusz Andrzejewski, Andrzej Niwiński, Ewa Wipszycka, Karol Myśliwiec, Adam Łukaszewicz
- Near Eastern archaeology: Kazimierz Michałowski, Piotr Bieliński, Barbara Kaim
- European archaeology: Erazm Majewski, Włodzimierz Antoniewicz, Zofia Podkowińska, Stefan Karol Kozłowski, Ryszard Mazurowski
- South America: Mariusz Ziółkowski
- Anthropology: Andrzej Wierciński

== History ==
=== 1816–1918 (Beginning of the archaeology at University of Warsaw) ===
The beginning of the archaeological investigations at University of Warsaw is related to establishing the Numismatic Cabinet (Gabinet Numizmatyczny) at 1816 and Cabinet of Ancient Curiosities (Gabinet Starożytnych Osobliwości)(1926) at former Royal University of Warsaw (1816–1831). The collections have been merged in 1877.

Although there was no formal archaeological institute, a number of archaeologists and antiquarians who were important in the formation of Polish archaeology, were active in Warsaw or worked at the university: Erazm Majewski, Kazimierz Stołyhwo, Stefan Krukowski, Leon Kozłowski, Ludwik Sawicki or Marian Hinner.

=== 1918-1975 ===
The first section, the Department of Prehistoric Archaeology, was created in 1919 in Staszic Palace, and was headed by Erazm Majewski. After E. Majewski's death in 1920, his successor was Włodzimierz Antoniewicz – the dean of the Faculty of History in 1934/35 and Rector of the University of Warsaw in 1936/37. In 1931, the Section of Classical Archaeology was created, led by the Polish egyptologist Kazimierz Michałowski. Over the years, new chairs and departments were established, such as the Department of Slavic Archaeology, the Department of Archaeology of Antiquity, the Department of Ancient Archaeology (later transformed into the Department of Prehistoric and Early Medieval Archaeology), and a Department of Anthropology. One of the largest ones was the Department of Prehistoric and Early Medieval Archaeology as it had 70 students in 1967/1968.

After Włodzimierz Antoniewicz, the department was headed by Zofia Wartołowska and Witold Hensel. At the beginning of the 1960s, Kazimierz Michałowski, Zofia Podkowińska, Zbigniew Sochacki, Bronisława Chomentowska, Maria Miśkiewicz, Andrzej Kempisty, Jerzy Gąssowski, Andrzej Wierciński, Stefan Karol Kozłowski and Janina Rosen-Przeworska were among the most prominent members of the staff.

Archaeology at University of Warsaw has been famous of existence of "warsaw school" in Slavic archaeology (Witold Hensel, Włodziemirz Antoniewicz), and Mediterranean Archaeology (Kazimierz Michałowski)

=== 1975–2020 (Institute of Archaeology) ===
In 1975 the Departments of Prehistoric and Early Medieval Archaeology, Papyrology and Mediterranean Archaeology were merged to form the Institute of Archaeology, as a part of Faculty of History at the University of Warsaw, with Waldemar Chmielewski as its first director. The institute was appointed from three departments: Prehistoric and Early Medieval Archaeology, Papyrology, and Mediterranean Archaeology, and then divided into seven sections. Afterwards, former Anthropological Laboratory at the Chair of the Prehistorical Archaeology (1960–1976) was changed to Department of Historical Anthropology The institute contained the following structure: Department of Prehistoric Archaeology (headed by Stefan Karol Kozłowski), Department of Archaeology of Ancient Europe (Jerzy Okulicz), Department of Early Medieval Archaeology (Zofia Wartołowska), Department of Archaeology of Ancient Greece and Rome (Anna Sadurska), Department of Near Eastern Archaeology (Michał Gawlikowski), Department of Papyrology (Anna Świderkówna) and Department of Historical Anthropology (Andrzej Wierciński). Alongside to the institute a Department of Archaeological Research on Polish Medieval times of Warsaw University of Technology and University of Warsaw, which was headed by Zofia Wartołowska. Later this entity was changed into Department of Archaeological Excavations of Institute of Archaeology headed by Ryszard Mazurowski.

By the end of the 1980s the University of Warsaw had trained more than 500 students in archaeology, which was the largest in Poland at that time, most of them studied in Institute of Archaeology. The huge majority of students were specialized in Stone Age, Neolithic, La Tene, and Roman Period, Medieval archaeology, Mediterranean Archaeology: Archaeology of Greece, Roman Archaeology, Egyptology In the early 1990s, Aleksander Bursche and Tomasz Mikocki contributed to further energetic development of the Institute by expanding the didactic programme and improving the management of the institute.

At the beginning of the 2000s, the Institute enrolled about 150 students for the first year of the Bachelor's programme and 240 for the first year of the Master's programme in archaeology. Despite the observed decrease in the next decade, the Institute remains the leading institution teaching archaeology in Poland. In 2019, every year 101 students applied for the Bachelor's degree in archaeology at the institute, 43 for the Master's degree

In the early 2010s, the didactics included Underwater Archaeology, and since 2012 a full introductory course Geographic Information System for Archaeologists, which was then further expanded to advanced level

In 2020, the Institute of Archaeology was reshaped into Faculty of Archaeology, and headed by Bartosz Kontny.

== Organizational structure ==
=== Departments ===
- Chair of Classical Archaeology
- Chair of Epigraphy and Papyrology
- Department of Aegean and Textile Archaeology
- Department of Archaeology of Egypt and Nubia
- Department of Archaeology of the Americas
- Department of Barbaricum and the Roman Provincial Archaeology
- Department of Bioarchaeology
- Department of Medieval and Early Modern Archeology
- Department of Numismatics and Museology
- EuroWeb. Europe through Textiles
- Stone Age Department

=== Laboratories ===
- Department for Archaeological Conservation
- Department for Modelling and Digital Documentation
- Department for Non-Invasive Methods
- Department for Underwater Archaeology
- Department of Archaeology of Images and Symbolism of Light
- Department of Circum-Pacific and Far Eastern Archaeology

== Published scientific journals ==
- Światowit – since 1899
- "Światowit", suplementy
- Bioarchaeology of the Near East – since 2007
- "Studia Archaeologica Sudauica" – since 2017
- "Studia i Materiały Archeologiczne" – since 1980
- "Studia i Materiały do Badań nad Neolitem i Wczesną Epoką Brązu na Mazowszu i Podlasiu" – since 2011
- "Archeo UW" – since 2013

== Online publishing ==
- Archeowieści.pl – since April 2021
