= Andrzej Wierciński (anthropologist) =

Polish anthropologist

- Born: Andrzej Kazimierz Wierciński; 22 April 1930; Chorzów, Silesian Voivodeship, Second Polish Republic
- Died: 8 December 2003 (aged 73); Warsaw, Masovian Voivodeship, Third Polish Republic
- Known for: Anthropologist, ethnologist, religious studies scholar, kabbalist
- Honours: rder of Polonia Restituta Fifth Class, Krzyż Kawalerski, the Knight's Cross. Gold Cross of Merit

Academic background
- Education: University of Warsaw

Academic work
- Notable students: Mariusz Ziółkowski
- Influenced: Manuela Gretkowska

Andrzej Wierciński (22 April 1930 – 8 December 2003) was a Polish anthropologist, ethnologist, religious studies scholar and Kabbalist.

== Biography ==
Wierciński was born on 22 April 1930, in Chorzów. He studied from 1948 to 1951 at the University of Warsaw, initially studying physics and later transferring to physical anthropology at the end of his first year. As a student, he became an assistant at the Institute of Anthropological and Ethnological Sciences. His master's thesis focused on the prehistoric population of southern Siberia. In 1957, he defended his doctoral thesis on the inheritance of individual racial traits. His habilitation thesis dealt with the origin of the Egyptian population during the predynastic period.

Wierciński was a professor at the University of Warsaw and the author of hundreds of papers published in specialist journals on general anthropology, anthropology of religion, Slavic ethnogenesis, ancient Egypt, pre-Hispanic Mexico, microevolutionary changes in Poland, symbolism theory, and culture theory. In 1959, he co-organized a scientific expedition to Egypt, where he was employed as a liaison between the Polish Academy of Sciences (PAN) and the National Research Centre in Egypt. From 1978, he led the Department of Historical Anthropology at the Institute of Archaeology at the University of Warsaw, and from 1993, he chaired the Department of General Anthropology at the Higher Pedagogical School in Kielce. He also lectured at the Institute of Religious Studies at the Jagiellonian University in Kraków and at many foreign universities as a visiting professor, including in Cairo, Paris, Washington, and Los Angeles. He received awards such as the Gold Cross of Merit and the Knight's Cross of the Order of Polonia Restituta.

In his later years, he focused on gematria. Since his school days, he was a close friend of Jerzy Prokopiuk, associated with the circle centered in Komorów around the anthroposophist, scholar, and mystic Robert M. Walter.

Wierciński died on 8 December 2003, in Warsaw.

== Selected works ==
- Magia i religia. Szkice z antropologii religii (Magic and Religion: Sketches from the Anthropology of Religion), Nomos, Kraków 2000, ISBN 83-85527-19-2
- Przez wodę i ogień. Biblia i Kabała (Through Water and Fire: Bible and Kabbalah), Nomos, Kraków 1996, ISBN 83-85527-36-2

== Commemoration ==
- Ziółkowski, M. S.; Sołtysiak, A. (2003). Między drzewem życia a drzewem poznania: Księga ku czci profesora Andrzeja Wiercińskiego. Wydział Zarządzania i Administracji AŚ, Zakład Antropologii Historycznej Instytutu Archeologii UW. ISBN 978-83-907360-9-9.
- Stefański, ed. (2014), "Vertiniana", The Peculiarity of Man, vol. 20, Toruń-Kielce: Wydawnictwo Adam Marszałek, Wydawnictwo Naukowe GRADO, p. 456, ISSN 2083-9235

== Bibliography ==
- Wykaz profesorów i docentów Uniwersytetu Warszawskiego. Dane biograficzne (List of Professors and Lecturers of the University of Warsaw: Biographical Data), "Annals of the University of Warsaw", volume 10 (edited by Ludwik Bazylow), 1971, p. 138
