= Zofia Podkowińska =

Polish archaeologist

- Born: 19 June 1894; Warsaw, Poland
- Died: 10 February 1975 (aged 80); Warsaw, Poland
- Education: University of Warsaw
- Known for: Neolithic studies
- Scientific career
- Fields: Archaeology

Zofia Podkowińska (17 May 1894 – 10 February 1975) was a Polish historian-archaeologist, specializing in the field of Neolithic studies.

== Biography ==
=== Education ===
Podkowińska was the daughter of the physician Zygmunt (1867–1932) and Józefa née Tarnowicz (1867–1941). During World War I, she spent time in Russia. In 1918, she graduated from the Polish Gymnasium named after Zofia Różycka in Moscow and received her matriculation certificate. Upon returning to Warsaw, she initially worked as a library assistant and later as the head of the Universal Library of the City of Warsaw at 24 Rozbrat Street. Her choice of study direction was influenced by her father, who was passionate about anthropology. In the fall of 1918, she enrolled at the Faculty of Philosophy at the University of Warsaw, attending archaeology classes taught by assistant professor Włodzimierz Antoniewicz. She studied under Stefan Krukowski and Ludwik Sawicki. They collaborated on studying the suburban sand dunes and conducted the first excavations. Simultaneously, from 1920 to 1922, she worked as a referent at the Central Statistical Office. In 1922, she became a demonstrator at the Department of Prehistoric Archaeology and, two years later, a junior assistant. In 1927, she presented the paper "Older and Younger Band Pottery in Poland," earning her a Ph.D. in philosophy. She conducted independent research in 1929 in Opatów and applied a method she had learned from Ludwik Sawicki during excavations in Jurkowice. During her research on Polish Neolithic in 1932, she received a scholarship from the National Culture Fund, which allowed her to travel abroad. She worked in museums in Czechoslovakia, Austria, and Germany, and the observations and conclusions were included in her work "Corded Ware Culture," which was submitted for printing in 1938 and was to be the basis for her habilitation thesis. Unfortunately, the printing house was burned in 1939, and her apartment was destroyed in 1944, resulting in the loss of her work.

=== World War II ===
During the Nazi occupation, she was not involved in any independence organization but helped activists of the People's Guard and later the People's Army from Ignacy Robb-Narbutt's unit. She was also engaged in assisting Jewish families threatened with arrest, organized by Adolf Berman. After the transfer of the collections from the Archaeological Museum in the Łazienki Park to the National Museum, she was assigned by Professor Konrad Jażdżewski to organize these collections. In the spring of 1941, the Nazi director Ernst Petersen and commissioner Werner Tzschaschel decided to merge all prehistoric collections. Zofia Podkowińska was then employed as an assistant at the museum and worked there until the outbreak of the Warsaw Uprising. Arrested after its fall in October 1944, she was transported to the Ravensbrück concentration camp and later to its branch in Konigsberg in Neumark (now Chojna), where she stayed until liberation on 18 February 1945.

On 28 November 1994, Yad Vashem recognised Zofia Podkowińska as Righteous Among the Nations. File 6365

=== Later career ===
After the end of World War II, she was appointed a curator at the State Archaeological Museum, and from 1947, she was the head of the department of the younger Stone Age. In the spring of 1946, she joined the Polish Workers' Party. At the same time, she worked at the Institute of Material Culture of the Polish Academy of Sciences, where she studied the history of the Sandomierz Upland and Małopolska in the younger Stone Age and early Bronze Age. She served on the history department board at the Ministry of Education, where she participated in the development of the history curriculum for schools. During this period, she published a textbook on prehistory for teachers. Additionally, she was active in the field, with significant achievements in the excavations at a Corded Ware Culture settlement in Ćmielów from 1947 to 1961. She dedicated many publications and scientific papers to the research in Ćmielów and Złota. From 1951, she conducted lectures on the archaeology of Europe and Poland at the Study of the History of Material Culture at the University of Warsaw. Throughout this time, she taught in the Neolithic Workshop, later the Neolithic Department. In 1954, she became its head, achieving the title of associate professor, and served on the Scientific Council of the Institute of Material Culture of the Polish Academy of Sciences. In 1964, she retired but remained active professionally, participating in the scientific life of Polish archaeology.

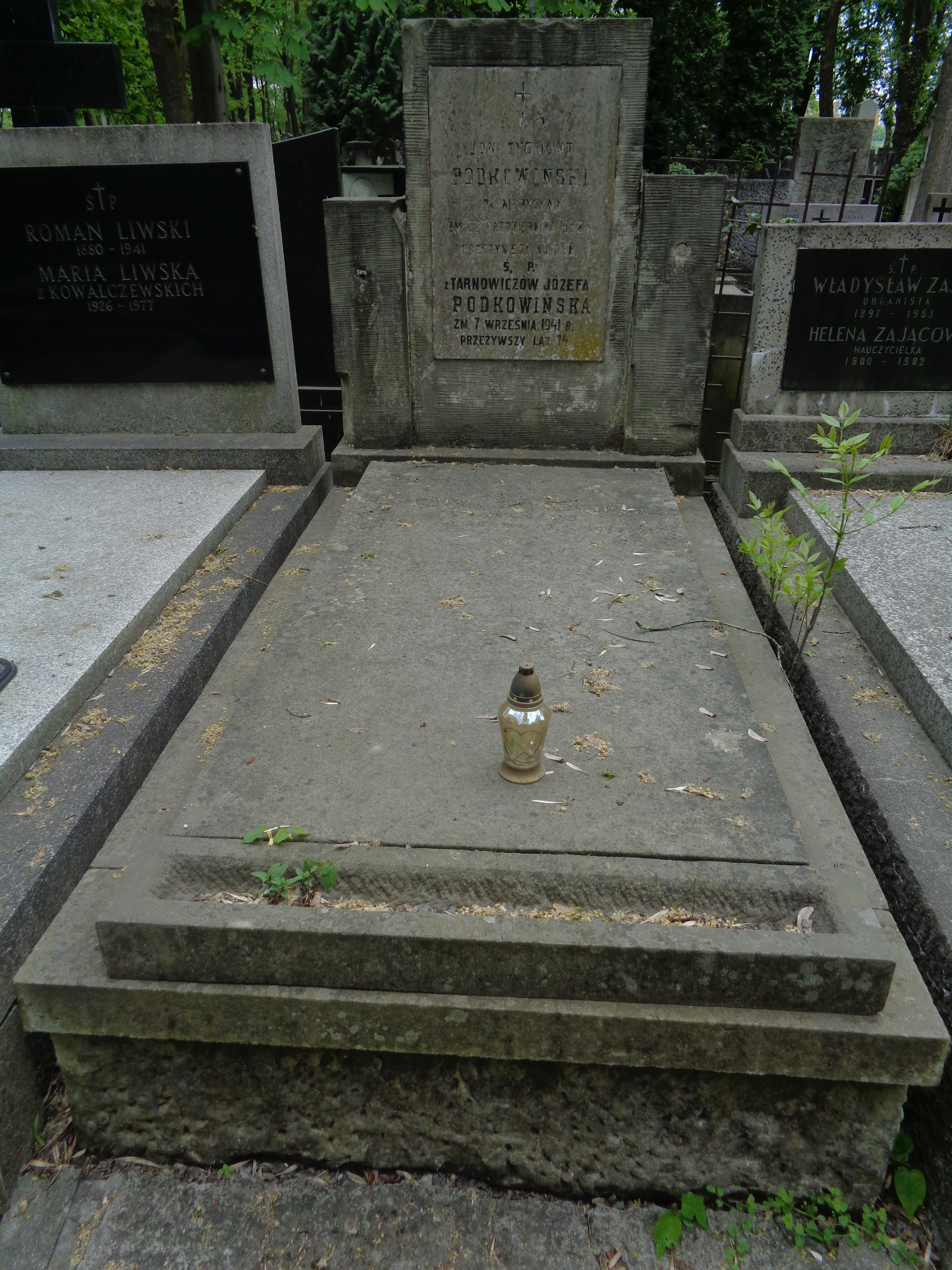
Zofia Podkowińska's grave at Powązki Cemetery in Warsaw

Podkowińska did not start a family. She died on 10 February 1975, and was buried at the Powązki Cemetery in Warsaw (Section 51–3–21).

== Orders and decorations ==
- Gold Cross of Merit (29 October 1947)
- Badge of the 1000th anniversary of the Polish State
