= Zofia Wartołowska =

Polish archeologist (1911–1976)

- Born: 22 May 1911; Warsaw, Poland
- Died: 3 September 1976 (aged 65); Warsaw, Poland
- Education: University of Warsaw
- Known for: Medieval archaeology of Poland
- Honours: Golden "Cross of Merit" (Poland) Silver "Cross of Merit" (Poland)
- Scientific career
- Thesis: Gród Sutiejsk a zagadnienie grodów wczesnodziejowych na pograniczu polsko-ruskim [Sutiejsk gord and the problem of early settlements in the Polish-Ruthenian borderland] (1948)
- Doctoral advisor: Włodzimierz Antoniewicz

Wartołowska Zofia (22 May 1911 – 3 September 1976) was a Polish archaeologist who was head of the Early Middle Ages Department of the Chair of Ancient and Early Modern Archaeology and alter the head of the Early Middle Ages Department of the Department of Prehistoric and Early Medieval Archaeology at the University of Warsaw (now the Faculty of Archaeology of the University of Warsaw)

== Early life ==
She was born on 22 of May 1911 in Warsaw, a daughter of Stefan Wartołowski and Bronisława a née Przedrzymska.

== Education and career ==
She studied at Faculty of Humanities at University of Warsaw under Stanisław Arnold and Jan K. Kochanowski. Since 1934, she participated in archaeology seminar of Włodzimierz Antoniewicz. In 1935, she started working as an assistant professor at Department of Prehistoric Archaeology.

After World War II, she started working as an assistant professor at National Museum of Archaeology, Poland and Chair of Prehistoric and Early Medieval Archaeology, where she started to give lectures since 1950.

She was later the head of the Early Middle Ages Department of the Chair of Ancient and Early Modern Archaeology. Head of the Early Middle Ages Department of the Department of Prehistoric and Early Medieval Archaeology at the University of Warsaw (now the Faculty of Archaeology of the University of Warsaw), and the head of Inventory of Fortified Settlements of The Management of Research on the Beginnings of the Polish State.

She specialized in early medieval settlements in Poland. Conducted excavations at Sutiejsk Grod, Sąsiadka and Wiślica (from 1949).

== Commemoration ==
She was awarded with Silver and Golden Cross of Merit. She is buried at the Powązki Cemetery.

== Selected publications ==
- Nauk, P. A.; Archeologicznego, Z. P. A.; Antoniewicz, W.; Wartołowska, Z. (1964). Mapa grodzisk w polsce. Państwowe Przedsiębiorstwo Wydawnictw Kartogrficznych.
- Wartołowska, Z. (1966). "ŻYCIE NAUKOWE I DYDAKTYCZNE W KATEDRZE ARCHEOLOGII PIERWOTNEJ I WCZESNOŚREDNIOWIECZNEJ UNIWERSYTETU WARSZAWSKIEGO W LATACH 1945—1964" (PDF). Światowit: Rocznik poświęcony archeologii przeddziejowej i badaniom pierwotnej kultury polskiej i słowiańskiej. 27: 94–108.
