= Robert Walter =

Robert Walter may refer to:

- Robert Walter (physician) (1841–1921), Canadian American physician and natural hygiene proponent
- Robert Walter (politician) (born 1948), British Conservative Member of Parliament
- Robert Walter (musician) (born 1970), keyboard player
- Robert Walter (editor), editor and executive with not-for-profit organizations
- Robert D. Walter (born 1944), American businessman
- Robert M. Walter (1908–1981), Polish astrologer and homeopath

== See also ==
- Robert fitz Walter of Horsham, English nobleman
- Robert Walters (disambiguation)
- Robert Walthour (1878–1949), American professional cyclist
