= Analecta Hermeneutica =

Annual hermeneutics journal

- Editor: Andrzej Wierciński
- Categories: Philosophy
- Frequency: Annual
- Publisher: Brill Publishers
- Founded: 2009
- Country: Canada
- Based in: Memorial University of Newfoundland
- Language: English
- Website: www.iih-hermeneutics.org/analecta-hermeneutica
- ISSN: 1918-7351

Analecta Hermeneutica is the annual refereed journal of the International Institute for Hermeneutics (IIH) which publishes contributions in all hermeneutically related fields in English, German, French, Italian, and Spanish with a particular focus on philosophy, theology, and comparative literature. Its editor-in-chief is Andrzej Wierciński and its editor is Ramsey Eric Ramsey. Analecta Hermeneutica is hosted by the Department of Philosophy at Memorial University of Newfoundland.
