= Manuela Gretkowska =

Polish author, screenwriter

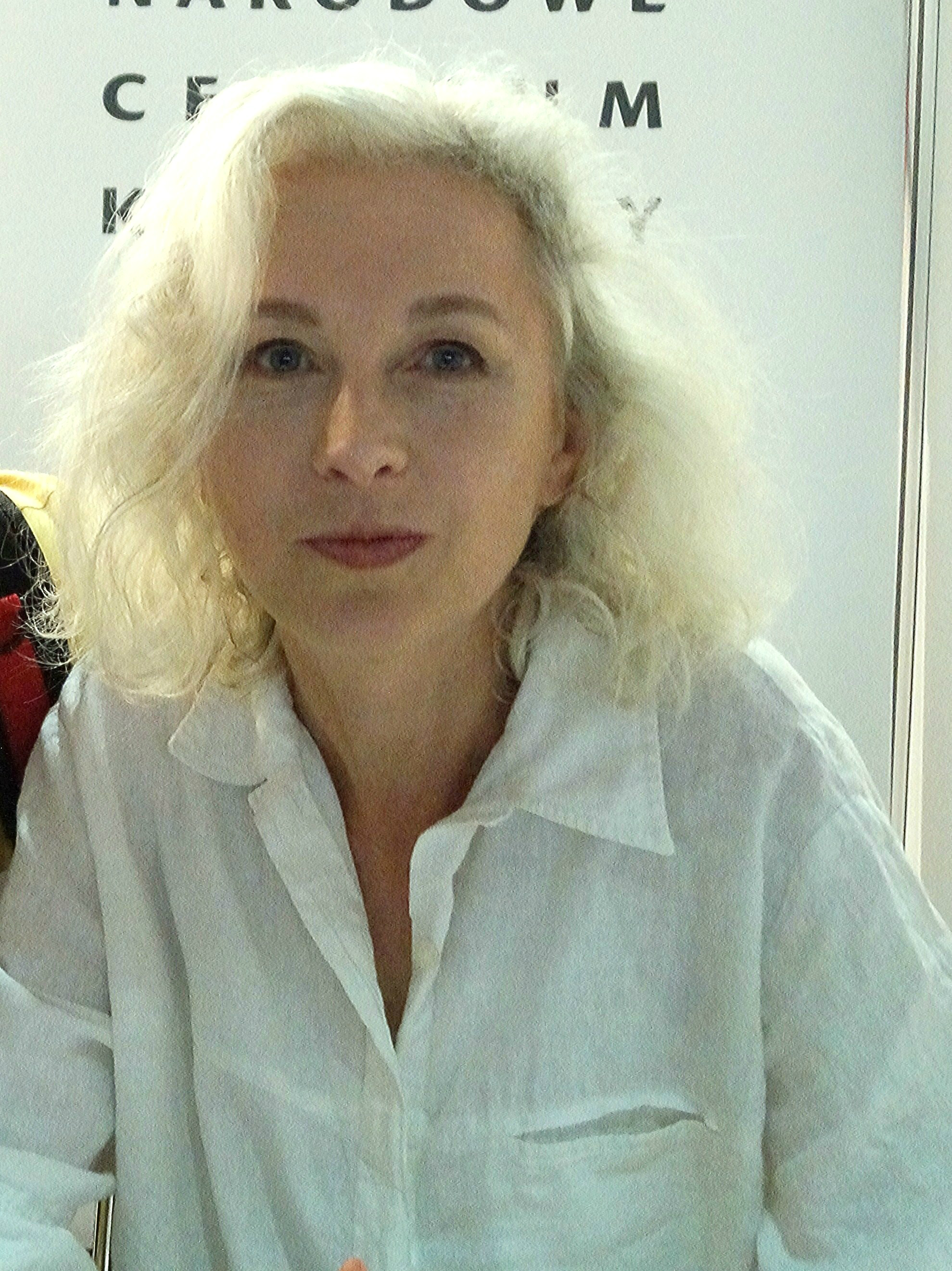
- Gretkowska in 2016
- Born: 1964 (age 61–62); Łódź, Poland
- Occupation: Screenwriter
- Political party: IF
- Spouse: Cezary Michalski
- Partner: Piotr Pietucha
- Children: 1

Academic background
- Education: UJ, EHESS
- Influences: Andrzej Wierciński
- Writing career
- Language: Polish
- Notable work: My zdies' emigranty
- Website: Manuela Gretkowska on Instagram

Manuela Gretkowska (born 1964) is a Polish writer, screenwriter, feminist and politician. She was the founder of the Feminist Initiative party.

== Biography ==
Gretkowska was born in Łódź and studied philosophy at the Jagiellonian University in Kraków. During this period, she began writing for the magazine Brulion. In 1988, she left Poland to live in Paris, where she studied anthropology at the School for Advanced Studies in the Social Sciences. In the early 1990s, she returned to her country of birth, where she was deputy editor-in-chief and then literary director at Elle. She wrote columns for Elle, Cosmopolitan, Wprost, Polityka, Machina, and Cogito.

Gretkowska's literary debut was the novel We Are Immigrants Here (My zdies' emigranty) (1991), in which she described the experiences of the young generation leaving Poland. The work of the young artist was favorably reviewed by Czesław Miłosz, whose preface appeared in the first edition. Gretkowska's next three books described the life of a modern artistic-intellectual bohemian living in France: Paris Tarot (1993), Metaphysical Cabaret (1994), and Textbook for people. Skull: The First and Last Volume (1996) connects gnosis, kabbala, the character of Mary Magdalene and the skull motif in global culture. During this period, Gretkowska gained the title of scandalist and postmodernist. In 1996, Gretkowska wrote a screenplay for Andrzej Żuławski's film Szamanka.

In 1997, Gretkowska moved to Sweden, where she published several collected stories in the book Namiętnik (The Passionate One) (1998), notes from her world travels in Światowidz (World-View) (1998), and her columns, under the collective title Silikon (Silicon) (2000). She also co-wrote the screenplay for the first season of the TV series Miasteczko (transl. Small Town) (2000).

Polka (Polish woman) (2001) was the writer's pregnancy journal, while Europejka (European Woman) (2004) presents a view of a changing Poland. In 2003 the author, together with her partner Piotr Pietucha, wrote Scenes from Extramarital Life. Three years later, Gretkowska wrote a column for the monthly magazine Success that was critical of the Jarosław Kaczyński and Lech Kaczyński, twins who at the time held the positions of Poland's president and prime minister). The issue was published with this text cut out of every copy.

=== Women's Party ===
In 2007, Gretkowska transformed the social movement "Poland is a Woman" into a new Political party named the Women's Party (later renamed Feminist Initiative), from which she ran a failed campaign in the Polish and European parliaments. In October 2007, after the party's defeat in the parliamentary elections, she resigned the party's leadership but remained an honorary chairwoman.

== Personal life ==
Gretkowska lives in Ustanów with her daughter and the writer and psychotherapist Pietucha.

== Works ==
=== Books ===
- My zdies' emigranty (1991)
- Tarot Paryski (1993)
- Kabaret Metafizyczny (1994)
- Podręcznik do ludzi (1996)
- Namiętnik (1998)
- Światowidz (1998)
- Silikon (2000)
- Polka (2001)
- Światowidz (2001)
- Sceny z życia pozamałżeńskiego (2003)
- Europejka (2004)
- Kobieta i mężczyźni (2007)
- Na dnie nieba (2007)
- Obywatelka (2008)
- Miłość po polsku (2010)
- Trans (2011)
- Agent (2012)
- Marysiu, jak myślisz? (2013)
- Miłość klasy średniej (2015)
- Filozofia na wynos (2016)
- Kosmitka (2016)
- Na linii świata (2017)
- Poetka i książe (2018)
- Trudno z miłości się podnieść / Manuela Gretkowska w rozmowie z Patrycją Pustkowiak (2019)
- Faworyty (2020)
- Mistrzyni (2021)
- Przeprawa (2023)
- Wenecja : miasto, któremu się powodzi (2024)
- Posag dla Polki (2024)
- Milionerka (2026)

=== Screenplays ===
- Szamanka (She-Shaman)(1996)
- Egoists (1999)
- Small Town (TV series)
