= Niwiński =

Niwiński (feminine: Niwińska; plural: Niwińscy) is a Polish surname. Notable people with the surname include:

- Andrzej Niwiński (born 1948), Polish archaeologist
- Helena Dunicz-Niwińska (1915–2018), Polish violinist
- Stanisław Niwiński (1932–2002), Polish actor
