= Maria Dembińska =

Polish historian (1916-1996)

- Born: Maria Anna Zofia Gołuchowska; 21 February 1916; Vienna, Austro-Hungarian Empire
- Died: 1 November 1996 (aged 80); Warsaw, Poland
- Burial place: Powązki Cemetery
- Spouse: Henryk Antoni Dembiński

Academic background
- Education: University of Warsaw

Maria Anna Zofia Dembińska (née Gołuchowska; 21 February 1916 – 1 November 1996) was a Polish medievalist, historian, and professor of history. She specialized in the history of medieval material culture.

== Early life ==
Maria Anna Zofia Gołuchowska was born on 21 February 1916 in the Austro-Hungarian capital Vienna. Her father was Wojciech Maria Agenor Gołuchowski, the Lviv voivode who was senator of the 4th term of the Second Polish Republic. Her mother was Countess Zofia Maria Czesława Gołuchowska (née Baworowska). Maria Gołuchowska spent her childhood in her family estate in Janów, in the Eastern Borderlands. She took history at the Sorbonne Nouvelle University, Paris in 1934 and then returned to Kresy to continue her studies at the University of Lviv.

== Marriage and family ==
She married Henryk Antoni Dembiński (1911–1986), owner of the Przysucha estate. After the wedding, she moved to her husband's estate to run the property with him. She gave birth to six children: Anna Maria (born 1938), Raphael (born and died 1939), Piotr Antoni (1940–2020), Elizabeth (born 1944), Joan (1946–1964), and Marta (born 1950).

== Career ==
Dembińska returned to her discontinued studies after World War I at the University of Warsaw.

After completing her historical studies at the University of Warsaw, she worked for many years at the Institute of History of Material Culture of the Polish Academy of Sciences. There, in the early 1960s, she defended, prepared under the direction of Aleksander Gieysztor, a doctoral dissertation on Polish culinary culture in the Middle Ages. In 1963, the work was published under the title "Food and Drink in Medieval Poland". Despite a small edition of publication (750 copies), this work became a popular field publication and was quickly recognized as a classic in the field of culinary history and the social history of everyday life.

She obtained the title of professor in 1980 – according to some sources – and 1993 according to others.

Due to the language of the publication, her scientific works appeared initially only in Eastern Europe. The exception was a 1960 article published in French. However, in 1973, she published an English summary of her research on the history of nutrition in Poland, making the results of her research available to Western historians for the first time. The publication was made more difficult by the fact that Dembińska had come to different results in her research and wanted to look at the doctrine determined by the Marxists.

Later, her scientific articles and book publications were published in Polish, English, French and German. The summary of her scientific work was published in English in book form only in 1999, three years after her death.

== Death ==
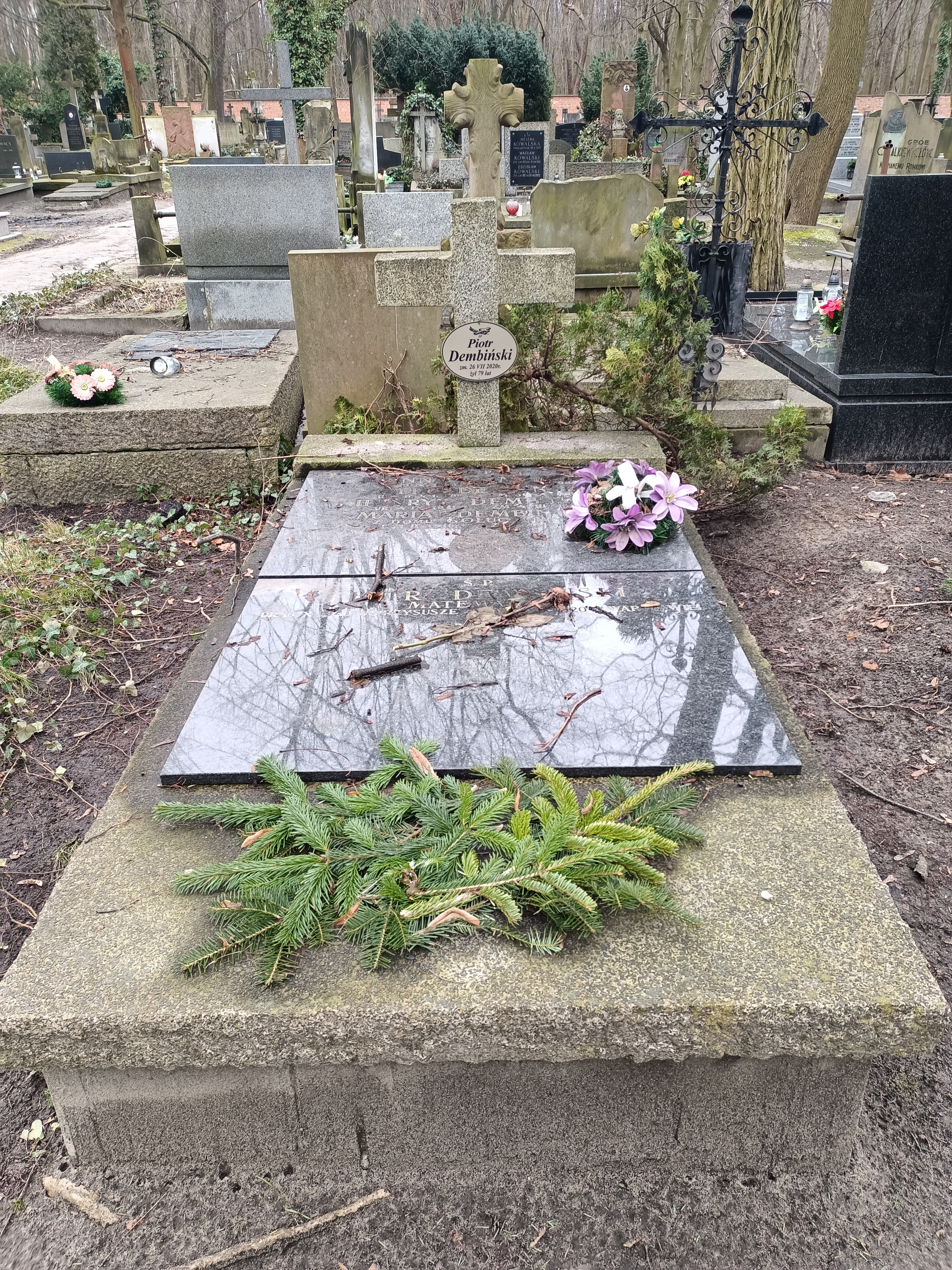
Tombstone of Maria Dembińska at the Powązki Cemetery

Maria Dembińska died on 1 November 1996 in Warsaw and was buried (along with her husband 10 years earlier) in the Powązki Cemetery.

== Bibliography ==
- Dembińska, Maria (1957) On the use of the statistical method in archaeological research;
- Dembińska, Maria (1957) From research on the development of the city of Loło in the early Middle Ages;
- Dembińska, Maria (1958) Some remarks on the role of fraternity in the rural economy of the Polish Middle Ages;
- Dembińska, Maria (1960) Les m?thodes de recherches sur l'alimentation en Pologne m?di?vale;
- Dembińska, Maria; ed. Francastel, Pierre (1960) Les origines des villes polonaises, Les : m?moires et expos?s de Dęminska [...] / recueil de travaux publi's par Pierre Francastel;
- Dembińska, Maria; Hensel, Witold (1960) Poland a thousand years ago;
- Dembonnia, Maria (1961) Attempt to calculate the amount of crop yields in royal allodaling in the 14th century;
- Dembińska, Maria (1962) Early mediaeval town as a centre of foodstuff consumption;
- Dembińska, Maria (1962) Karol Potkański as a historian of the original settlement against the background of research of the Kurpiska Forest;
- Dembine, Maria (1963) La consommation alimentaire en Pologne m?di?vale;
- Dembińska, Maria (1963) Food consumption in medieval Poland;
- Debonese, Maria (1963) Review of Studies on the History of the Forests of Medieval France;
- Dembińska, Maria (1964) From the past of Szczecin;
- Dembian, Maria (1965) Le Prime Minister of Congr... Congres International d'Archologie Slave tenu a Varsovie di 14 au 18 septembre 1965;
- Dembińska, Maria (1965) From the issue of research on the cultivation structure of certain cereals in the first millennium AD;
- Dembine, Maria (1966) 1st International Congress of Slavic Archaeology.
- Dembińska, Maria; Nieęwęłowski, Andrzej; Kotulowa, Anna (1966) From research on settlements in late-Year and Roman periods in Mazovia;
- Dembińska, Maria (1967) The medieval forest – robbery or economy;
- Dembińska, Maria (1967) The share of gathering in medieval grain consumption;
- Dembińska, Maria (1970) Publishing work of the Society (1945–1970);
- Dembonnia, Maria (1970) La palaobotanique, science auxiliare de l'histoire;
- Dembińska, Maria (1970) Rations or food standards: (weights on the margins of A. the Duke;
- Dembonnia, Maria (1970) From the history of the horse region;
- Dembińska, Maria (1971) Historical research on food consumption in Poland;
- Dembińska, Maria (1973) Cereal Processing in Medieval Poland (X–XIV century);
- Dembińska, Maria (1975) Food distances in the second half of the 19th century: (remarks on the margins of D.J. Oddy');
- Dembińska, Maria (1978) History of Polish material culture in outline;
- Dembińska, Maria; Hensel, Witold; Podwińska, Zofia (1978) [History of Polish material culture: in line: volume. 1]: From the 7th to the 12th century;
- Dembińska, Maria (1979, 1984) Agriculture, colonisation, foret: controverse ou unit?;
- Dembińska, Maria; Molenda, Danuta; Balcerzak, Elizabeth (1979) Daily food portions in Europe in the 9th to the 17th centuries. [Furnivocacy rations in Europe in the 9th to 19th century];
- Dembińska, Maria (1986) Women in daily life of medieval Poland;
- Dembińska, Maria (1987) Catching officers in eighteenth-century Poznań – arithmetic and reality: (attentions on the margins of article B. Więcławski);
- Dembińska, Maria (1988) Method of meat and fish conservation in the light of archaeological and sources historical;
- Dembińska, Maria (1989) Sketches from the history of the material existence of Polish society;

=== Posthumous ===
- Dembińska, Maria (1999) Food and drink in medieval Poland : Rediscovering a cuisine of the past;
- Dembińska, Maria (1999) Food and drink in medieval Poland: rediscovering the cuisine of the past, translated by Magdalena Thomas, corrected by William Woys Weaver;
- Red. red. Dembińska, Maria; Arkuszewski, Antoni; Ciepłowska, Stanisława; Epsztein, Tadeusz; Górzyński, Sławomir; Kiersnowski, Ryszard; Konarska, Barbara; Leskiewiczowa, Janina (t. 6: 2002) Polish Landings of the 20th Century : Biographical Dictionary;
