= Waldemar Chmielewski =

Polish archeologist (1929 - 2004)

- Born: 17 July 1929; Łódź
- Died: 21 July 2004 (aged 75)
- Education: University of Łódź
- Scientific career
- Fields: Archaeology, Prehistory, Pleistocene Archaeology
- Thesis: "Civilisation de Jerzmanowice" (1960)

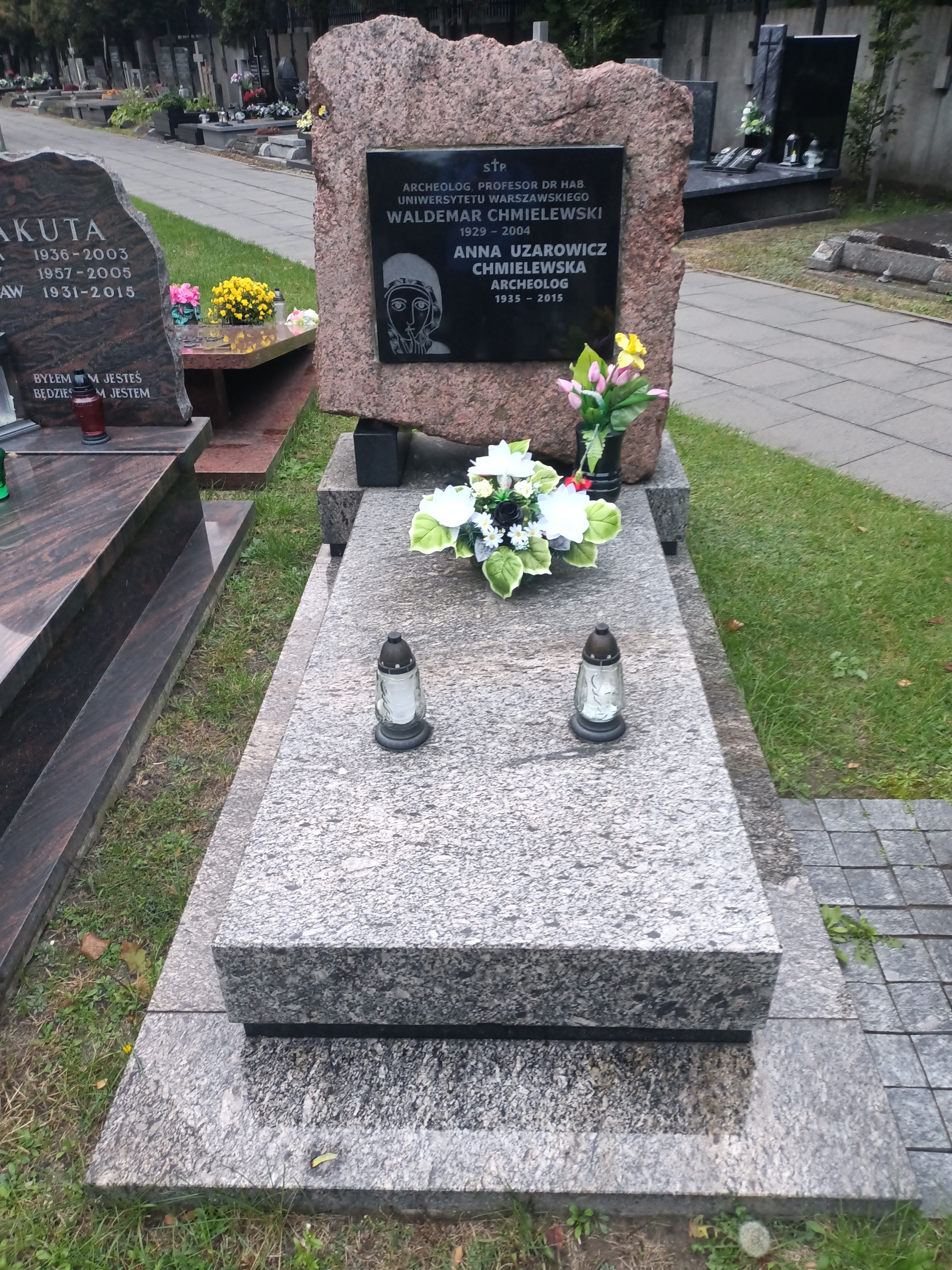
Waldemar Chmielewski's grave at the Powązki Military Cemetery

Waldemar Chmielewski (June 17, 1929 – July 21, 2004) was a Polish archaeologist, professor and founding director of the Institute of Archeology at the University of Warsaw. He specialized in the prehistory of Africa and Asia and was an expert in the study of the Paleolithic era in Polish territories.

== Biography ==
In 1951, he completed his studies at the University of Łódź. He was part of the group of students under the supervision of Konrad Jażdżewski. He defended his master's thesis at the age of 22, based on the results of excavations conducted under Jażdżewski's direction in Sarnowo and Gaj. In 1960, he obtained a doctoral degree based on the results of his own archaeological research in the caves of Jerzmanowice and Sąspów. In 1963, he obtained the habilitation degree.

From 1948 to 1963, he worked at the Archaeological and Ethnographic Museum in Łódź. From 1956 to 1970, he was also employed at the Institute of Material Culture of the Polish Academy of Sciences (Institute of Archeology and Ethnology of the Polish Academy of Sciences). Since 1970, he was also academically associated with the University of Warsaw. He served as the director of the Institute of Archaeology (1976–1987) and as the dean of the Faculty of History, University of Warsaw. For a brief period, he was also employed as a lecturer at the Department of Archaeology at the University of Łódź. In 1971, he became an associate professor, and around 1980, he attained the rank of full professor.

He specialized in the study of the Paleolithic era in Polish territories. He frequently participated in scientific expeditions with archaeologists to Egypt, Sudan, Iraq, and India. He initiated a long-term expedition of Polish archaeologists to Nubia, where international rescue excavations were conducted during the construction of the Aswan Dam. Since 1966, he was a member of the International Union for Prehistoric and Protohistoric Sciences. Together with Teresa Madeyska, he conducted archaeological research at the Wylotne Shelter in Ojców. He also conducted research at the site of Kraków-Zwierzyniec (site 1).

He was buried at the Powązki Military Cemetery.

== Selected works ==
- Chmielewski, W. (1952). Zagadnienie grobowców kujawskich w świetle ostatnich badań (No. 2). Wydawn. Muzeum Archeologicznego.
- Chmielewski, W. (1961). Civilisation de Jerzmanowice. Zakład Narodowy im. Ossolińskich.
- Chmielewski, W. (1968). Early and Middle Paleolithic sites near Arkin, Sudan. In The prehistory of Nubia; [final report] papers assembled and (pp. 110–147). Fort Burgwin Research Center; [distributed by] Southern Methodist University Press [Dallas].
- Chmielewski, W., Schild, R., & Wieckowska, H. (1975). Prahistoria ziem polskich, Tom I, Paleolit i mezolit. Ossolieum.
- Chmielewski, W., & Bałdyga, J. (1987). The Pleistocene and early Holocene archaeological sites on the Atbara and Blue Nile in Eastern Sudan. Polska Akademia Nauk. Instytut Historii Kultury Materialnej.
