= Stefan Karol Kozłowski =

Polish archaeologist (1938–2022)

- Born: 4 November 1938; Lviv, Second Polish Republic (now Ukraine)
- Died: 2 September 2022 (aged 83)
- Education: University of Warsaw
- Known for: Archaeological research on the Mesolithic and Neolithic periods
- Honours: Order of Polonia Restituta Fifth Class
- Scientific career
- Fields: Archaeology
- Workplaces: University of Warsaw, Cardinal Stefan Wyszyński University, Warsaw
- Thesis: Mezolit w Małopolsce (1967)
- Doctoral advisor: Waldemar Chmielewski

Stefan Karol Kozłowski (4 November 1938 – 2 September 2022) was a Polish archaeologist known for his contributions to the study of the Mesolithic and Neolithic periods in Poland and the Near East. He was a member of the Polish Academy of Arts and Sciences. He was awarded with the Order of Polonia Restituta Knight's Cross.

== Biography ==
Kozłowski studied archaeology at the University of Warsaw from 1956 to 1961, where he later earned his doctorate in 1967. His doctoral dissertation, supervised by Prof. Waldemar Chmielewski, focused on the Mesolithic period in Małopolska. In 1971, he obtained his habilitation degree based on his research on the prehistory of Polish territory from 9,000 to 4,000 BCE. He became a professor at the University of Warsaw in 1981.

Kozłowski led archaeological expeditions in Poland and Iraq, focusing on the Stone Age, particularly the European Mesolithic and early Neolithic. He chaired the Mesolithic Commission of the International Union for Prehistoric and Protohistoric Sciences (UISPP) from 1976.

== Selected works ==
- Cultural differentiation of Europe from 10th to 5th Millennium B.C. Warszawa, 1975
- Pradzieje ziem polskich od IX do V tysiąclecia p.n.e. Warszawa: PWN, 1972
- Pradzieje Europy od XL do IV tysiąclecia p.n.e. Warszawa: PWN, 1975, (wraz z J. K. Kozłowskim)
- Epoka kamienia na ziemiach polskich, Warszawa: PWN, 1977, (wraz z J. K. Kozłowskim)
- Atlas of the Mesolithic in Europe, Warszawa, 1980
