= Adam Łukaszewicz =

Polish archaeologist

- Born: 1950 (age 75–76)
- Citizenship: POL
- Education: University of Warsaw
- Known for: Greek epigraphy, ancient history, papyrology
- Scientific career
- Fields: Archaeology
- Workplaces: Faculty of Archaeology

Adam Tadeusz Łukaszewicz (born 1950) is a Polish papyrologist and Mediterranean archaeologist, professor at the University of Warsaw, affiliated with the Papyrology Department at the Faculty of Archaeology, University of Warsaw.

== Biography ==
Łukaszewicz studied Mediterranean archaeology at the University of Warsaw, completing his master's thesis on the iconography of the anchorites Aaron based on a mural from the Faras Cathedral in 1974. He has been associated with the University of Warsaw since 1974. He obtained his Ph.D. in humanities in 1978, defending a dissertation on "Public Buildings in Roman Egypt based on Papyrus Sources," and habilitation in 1992 based on the work "Aegyptiaca Antoniniana. The Activity of Caracalla in Egypt 215–216." Since 1995, he has held the position of a university lecturer (professor) in the Papyrology Department. On March 5, 2004, the President conferred on him the scientific title of Professor.

Łukaszewicz is also a permanent collaborator of the Center for Mediterranean Archaeology at the University of Warsaw in Cairo, a member of the Scientific Council of the center, and has worked in Alexandria and in other Polish archaeological missions. He conducts epigraphic research in the Valley of the Kings, led an excavation mission in Dendera in Upper Egypt. In 1991, he became a member of the Institute for Advanced Study in Princeton. Author of books and numerous scientific articles, as well as translations of scientific literature. A popularizer of knowledge about antiquity.

== Selected publications ==
- Les édifices publics dans les villes de l'Égypte romaine. Problèmes administratifs et financiers, Warsaw 1986
- Aegyptiaca Antoniniana. Działalność Karakalli w Egipcie (215–216), Warsaw 1993
- Aegyptiacae quaestiones tres, Warsaw 1995
- Antoninus Philosarapis, Warsaw 1998
- Kleopatra, czyli koniec dynastii, Warsaw 2000
- Świat papirusów, Warsaw 2001
- Kleopatra – ostatnia królowa starożytnego Egiptu, Warsaw 2005
- Egipt Greków i Rzymian, Warsaw 2006
- W słońcu Egiptu : z dziejów podróży nad Nil, Warsaw, 2020

== Translations ==
- Upadek Rzymu (Joseph Vogt), Warsaw 1993
- Bogowie i symbole starożytnych Egipcjan (Manfred Lurker), Warsaw 1995
- Marek Aureliusz (Pierre Grimal), Warsaw 1997
- Dzieje starożytnego Egiptu (Nicolas Grimal), Warsaw 2004
