= Robert Walters =

Robert Walters may refer to:

- Robert Walters plc, a global recruitment services group
- Robert Walters (footballer) (born 1955), Australian footballer
- Robert Walters (mayor) (died 1733), mayor of New York City
- Robert L. Walters, List of Scripps National Spelling Bee champions
- Rob Walters, director of Spend an Evening with Saddle Creek

== See also ==
- Robert Walter (disambiguation)
