= Anna Sadurska =

Polish Classical scholar and archaeologist

Anna Sadurska

Anna Sadurska (1 September 1921–3 March 2004) was a Polish Classical philologist, epigrapher, and archaeologist who taught at the University of Warsaw.

== Education ==
Sadurska studied classical philology and archaeology at the University of Warsaw from 1945–49; her archaeology professor was Kazimierz Michałowski, with whom she would later collaborate as a colleague. She then studied for a PhD at the same university, researching the National Museum in Warsaw's collection of Roman funerary inscriptions, which she completed in 1951.

== Academic career ==
Sadurska began her career working in the Ancient Art Department in the National Museum in Warsaw, where she worked from 1949-1951 during her PhD. She then moved to the University of Warsaw, where she became Chair of Mediterranean Archaeology in 1971 (the position previously held by Kazimierz Michałowski) and a full professor in 1980.

Sadurska's scholarly work included writing the first Polish university textbook on Roman archaeology and publishing on Greek and Latin inscriptions and iconography. She also excavated in the Crimea, Egypt, and Syria, where she was deputy director of the Polish excavations at Palmyra: she published the Tomb of the Family of ʻAlainê from ancient Palmyra, which was excavated by the Polish archaeological mission in 1969, as well as other studies of Palmyrene funerary and religious art and iconography. Her work on Palmyrene sculpture won the “Premio europeo di archeologia" (European Archaeology Prize) in 1994. Prompted by her rediscovery of a missing example of the Tabulae Iliacae, miniature stone carvings from the Roman world that depict scenes from the Trojan War, Sadurska also wrote a monograph on these carvings, which according to one obituary is "still cited as a Bible by all students of Homeric iconography".

== Publications ==
- 1964. Les tables iliaques. Warsaw: Państwowe Wydawn.
- 1977. Le tombeau de famille de ʻAlainê. Varsovie: PWN-Éditions scientifiques de Pologne.
- Sadurska, A., ʻAdnān Bunnī, and Matḥaf Tadmur. 1994. Les sculptures funéraires de Palmyre. Rome: G. Bretschneider.
