= Jerzy Prokopiuk =

Polish anthroposophist (1931–2021)

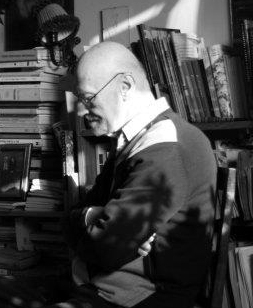
Jerzy Prokopiuk (2015)

Jerzy Prokopiuk (June 5, 1931 – March 18, 2021) was a Polish anthroposophist, gnostic, philosopher, and translator of literature, born in Warsaw. He translated into Polish works written by Aldous Huxley, Rudolf Steiner, Carl Gustav Jung, Max Weber and many other authors.

Prokopiuk died from COVID-19, at the age of 89.

== Works ==
- Labirynty herezji, Warszawa 1999, Muza, ISBN 83-7200-132-4
- Ścieżki wtajemniczenia. Gnosis aeterna, Warszawa 2000, doM wYdawniczy tCHu, ISBN 83-901178-4-3
- Nieba i piekła, 2001, Uraeus, ISBN 83-85732-95-0
- Szkice antropozoficzne, 2003, Studio Astropsychologii, ISBN 83-7377-045-3
- Światłość i radość, 2003, Dom na wsi, ISBN 83-916377-6-X
- Rozdroża, czyli zwierzenia gnostyka, 2004, Wydawnictwo KOS, ISBN 83-89375-46-X
- Jestem heretykiem, 2004, Studio Astropsychologii, ISBN 83-7377-121-2
- Proces Templariuszy, 2005, Wydawnictwo tCHu, ISBN 83-89782-13-8
- Dzieje magii, 2006, wydawnictwo Akasha, ISBN 83-920116-3-5
