= Andrzej Niwiński =

Polish archaeologist

- Born: 1948 (age 77–78)
- Education: Institute of Archaeology, University of Warsaw
- Honours: Commander's Cross of the Order of Merit of the Republic of Poland
- Scientific career
- Fields: Archaeology, Egyptology
- Workplaces: Institute of Archaeology, University of Warsaw
- Thesis: (1979)
- Doctoral advisor: Kazimierz Michałowski

Andrzej Stefan Niwiński (born 1948 in Warsaw) is a Polish archaeologist, specializing in the field of religious iconography and mythological studies of the XXI–XXII Dynasty. Especially known as a specialist in the studies of coffins from XXI dynasty, and his search for tomb of Herihor.

== Biography ==
In 1971, he graduated with a degree in Mediterranean archaeology from the University of Warsaw, under the supervision of Professor Kazimierz Michałowski. Since 1973 his research focused on the religious iconography of 21 dynasty. He obtained his doctorate in 1979 and habilitation in 1989. He worked at the Department of Egyptian Archaeology at the Institute of Archaeology, University of Warsaw. He participated in the Polish Archaeological Mission at the Mortuary temple of Hatshepsut from 1972 to 1974. In 1981 he received as scholarship at Ägyptologisches Institut of Ruprecht-Karls-Universität Heidelberg in Heidelberg as part of Humboldt Research Fellowship Programme (1981-1984). In 2000 he became a full professor.

He is the founder and president of the Association of Egypt Enthusiasts HERHOR.

In 2022, he was awarded the Commander's Cross of the Order of Merit of the Republic of Poland.

== The search for Herihor tomb ==
Andrzej Niwiński began searching for the tomb of Herihor in 1980. As no mummy of this phaoraoh has been found yet, Niwiński believes that if the tomb is excavated, it could be an intact grave.

The Cliff Mission at Deir el-Bahari started operating in 1999, although, the area above Mortuary temple of Hatshepsut as potential place of Herihor tomb was already assigned by him in 1986. The main purpose of Cliff Mission was to carry out an Egyptological examination of the cliff ledge situated above the temples of Hatshepsut and Thutmose III to detect all the traces of human activity and to find the grave of Herihor.

In 2020 during the works of the Cliff Mission at Deir el-Bahari, Niwinski's team have discovered a stone chest containing a royal deposit inscribed with Thutmose II name, which might be located near the grave of that pharaoh, which have not been found yet

== Popularisation of archaeology ==
He hosted a television series on Ancient Egyptian topics in the program Kwant in Telewizja Polska. He was a main character of documentary movie "The secrets of Herihor" (Tajemnice Herhora)(2010) and "What if nothing" (A co jeśli nic?) (2020) directed by Monika Krupa.

Andrzej Niwiński has presented his research on Herihor on multiple occasions in Television or newspapers. He is well known from his interviews popularising knowledge of ancient Egypt, and criticising non-scientific theories about ancient Egypt

== Selected publications ==
- Niwinski, A. (1989). "Studies on the illustrated Theban Funerary Papyri of the 11th and 10th Centuries B.C." Orbis Biblicus et Orientalis. 86. Universitätsverlag / Vandenhoeck & Ruprecht. doi:10.5167/uzh-156842.
- Niwiński, A. (1992). Mity i symbole starożytnego Egiptu. Wydaw. "PRO-EGIPT". ISBN 978-83-900692-0-3.
- Tyszkiewicz, M.; Niwiński, A. (1994). Egipt zapomniany czyli Michała hr. Tyszkiewicza dziennik podróży do Egiptu i Nubii (1861-1862): oraz 180 rycin z XIX wieku. Wydawnictwo "PRO-EGIPT" Warszawa. ISBN 83-900692-2-9.
- Niwiński, A. (2008). Abecadło znad Nilu. Seria z Okiem Horusa. Wydawnictwo "Pro-Egipt" Warszawa. ISBN 978-83-915941-1-7.
- Niwiński, A. (2005). Czekając na Herhora...: odkrywanie tajemnic Teb Stubramnych czyli szkice z dziejów archeologii Egiptu. Bertelsmann Media Warszawa. ISBN 83-7391-831-0.
- Niwiński, A. (2008). Bajki staroegipskie. Seria z Okiem Horusa. Wydawnictwo "Pro-Egipt" Warszawa. ISBN 978-83-915941-2-4.
- Niwinski, A.; Brzeziński, W. (2011). Papirusy, mumie, złoto-- : Michał Tyszkiewicz i 150-lecie pierwszych polskich i litewskich wykopalisk w Egipcie = Papyri, mummies and gold--: Michał Tyszkiewicz and the 150th anniversary of the first Polish and Lithuanian excavations in Egypt. Dla Stowarzyszenia Miłośników Egiptu "Herhor" : Państwowe Muzeum Archeologiczne w Warszawie Warszawa. ISBN 978-83-915941-4-8.
- Niwiński, A. (2012). Hieny i lotosy. "Pro-Egipt" Wydawnictwo Książkowe Andrzej Niwiński Warszawa. ISBN 978-83-915941-5-5.
- Niwinski, A. (2020). Hyenas and lotuses. Royal Hawaiian Press. ISBN 978-1-73486-061-0.
