= Włodzimierz Antoniewicz =

Polish archaeologist

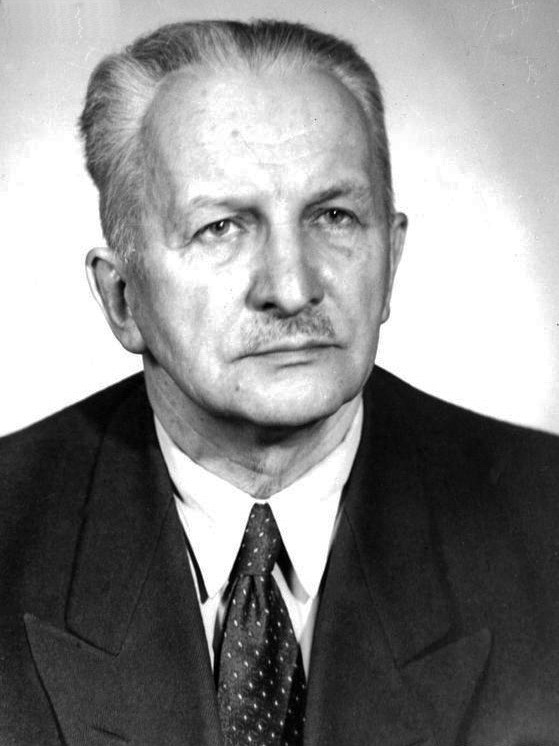
- Born: July 15, 1893; Sambir, Austrian Empire (now Ukraine)
- Died: May 20, 1973 (aged 79); Warsaw, Poland
- Honours: ,,,,
- Scientific career
- Fields: Archaeology
- Workplaces: Vilnius University, University of Warsaw
- Thesis: (1918)
- Doctoral advisor: Jagiellonian University

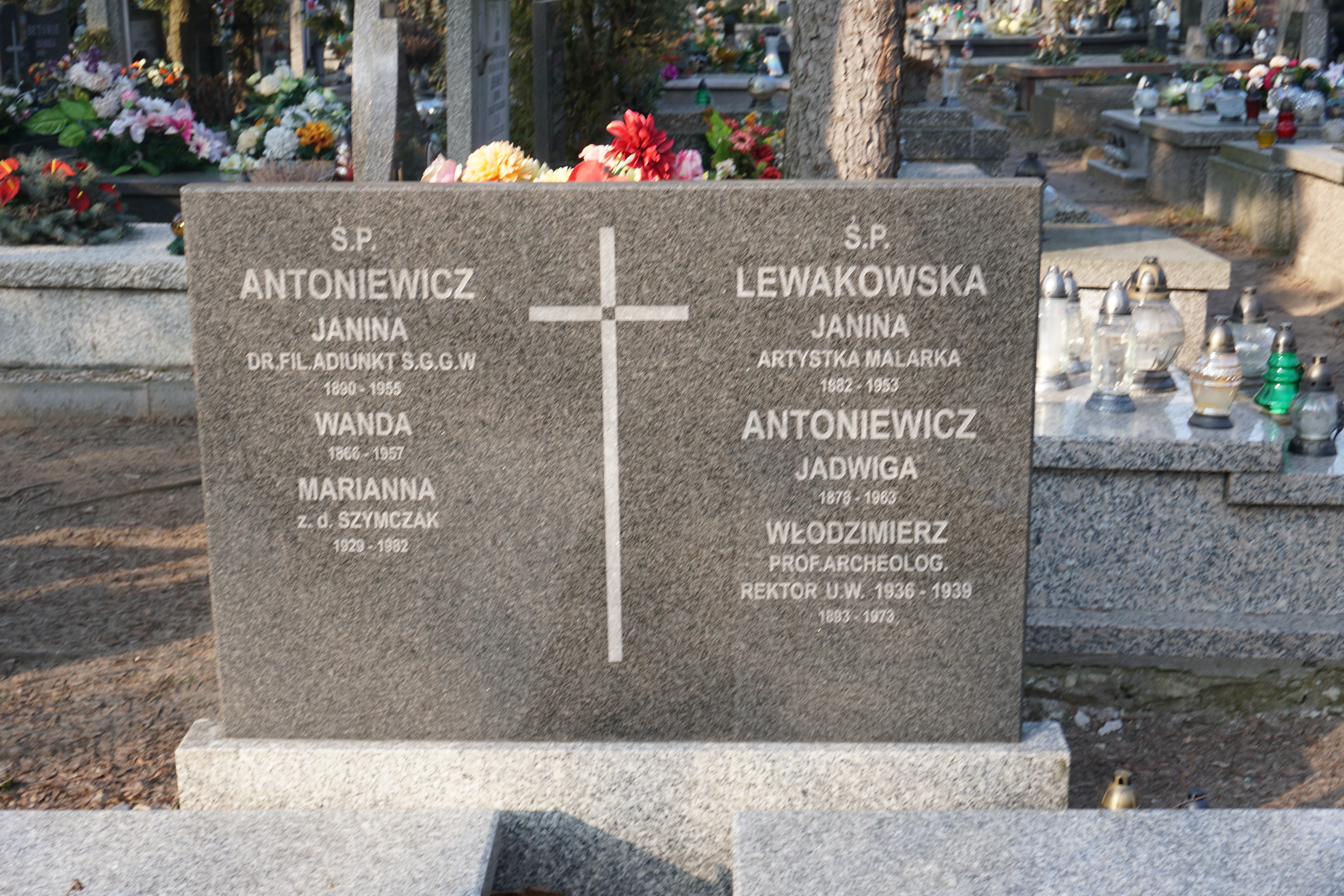
Włodzimierz Antoniewicz's grave at the cemetery in Milanówek

Włodzimierz Antoniewicz (July 15, 1893 – May 20, 1973) was a Polish archaeologist of Armenian descent, rector of the University of Warsaw, and a member of the PAN.

In his scientific work, Włodzimierz Antoniewicz focused on prehistoric archaeology of Polish lands. He presented a picture of the earliest history of Polish territories based on archaeological research. Antoniewicz discovered remains of Romanesque buildings in the archaeological station he founded in Wiślica. Additionally, he was the first to present a synthesis of the religions of ancient Slavs.

== Biography ==
Włodzimierz Antoniewicz born on July 15, 1893, in Sambir, the son of the Polish Armenian Karol (postal controller, participant in the January Uprising) and Wanda Kurowska (painter and social activist).

He completed his secondary education at the gymnasium in Lvov. He studied archaeology and geography at the University of Lviv, the Jagiellonian University, as well as at universities in Vienna, Paris, and Prague. Among his teachers were, among others, Eugeniusz Romer and Ludomir Sawicki.

In 1914, he was severely wounded on the wartime front. After being discharged from the military, he worked as a curator at the Wawel Castle Museum (1916–1918). He defended his doctoral thesis at the Jagiellonian University in 1918 under the supervision of Piotr Ignacy Bieńkowski (The Significance of Amber in the Prehistory of Europe). From 1918 to 1920, he served as the deputy head of the Department of Culture and Art of the Temporary Governing Commission in Krakow. Antoniewicz briefly worked as an associate professor of prehistoric archaeology at the University of Poznań, where he also obtained his habilitation in 1920.

From 1920 onwards, he was associated with the University of Warsaw. He served as the head of the Department of Prehistoric and Early Medieval Archaeology (after World War II, renamed the Department of Polish Archaeology), an associate professor (since 1924), a full professor (since 1928), the dean of the Faculty of Humanities (1934–1936), and finally, the rector (1936–1939). In October 1937, he issued an order introducing the ghetto bench segregation at the university.

During the occupation period, he was a member of the Secret Senate of the University of Warsaw. At that time, he worked as a stoker in Warsaw schools and later found employment as a clerk in the Municipal Administration. He continued to give lectures at the University of Warsaw after the war until his retirement in 1963.

From 1924 to 1939, he served as the director of the Warsaw Archaeological Museum named after Erazm Majewski. In the years 1945–1946, he was the vice-director of the National Museum of Archaeology, Poland.

Additionally, he collaborated with the Institute of the History of Material Culture of the Polish Academy of Sciences and the Ministry of Religious Denominations and Public Education. From 1921 to 1934, he lectured at the Free Polish University in Warsaw. Between 1925 and 1934, he also delivered lectures at the Vilnius University.

Włodzimierz Antoniewicz died on May 20, 1973, in Warsaw. He is buried in the cemetery in Milanówek.

== Membership in scientific organizations ==
Antoniewicz was a member of numerous scientific societies and academies, both Polish and international:

- From 1930, he was a corresponding member of the Warsaw Scientific Society, and from 1938, a full member.
- Starting in 1932, he was a corresponding member of the Polish Academy of Learning.
- From 1952, he was a titular member of the Polish Academy of Sciences (PAN), and from 1957, a full member of PAN.
- From 1946 to 1949, he served as the vice-chairman of the Warsaw Scientific Society.
- He led the Commission for the History of Culture and Art of the Warsaw Scientific Society and simultaneously served as the editor-in-chief of its publications.
- He collaborated with the Leopoldina Academy in Halle.
- He was appointed to the Academy of Ancient History in Stockholm, the London Archaeological Society.
- He was a member of the Prehistoric Society and the Anthropological Society in Vienna.
- He was an Honorary Fellow of the Society of Antiquaries in London.
- He served as the vice-president of the Polish Ethnological Society and the Polish Archaeological Society.

== Selected publications ==
Antoniewicz was also an encyclopedist. He was listed among the 180 editors of the five-volume Ilustrowana encyklopedia Trzaski, Everta i Michalskiego, where he wrote entries on archaeological topics.

Włodzimierz Antoniewicz published over 300 scientific papers, including:

- Baba kamienna w Dźwinogrodzie (1916)
- Archeologia przedhistoryczna jako przedmiot nauczania (1921)
- Pochodzenie i gatunki bursztynu w Europie (1923)
- Pradzieje ziem polskich (1927)
- Archeologia Polski. Zarys czasów przedhistorycznych i wczesnodziejowych ziem Polski (1928)
- O religii dawnych Słowian (1948-1949)
- Historia sztuki najdawniejszych społeczeństw pierwotnych (1957)
- Religia dawnych Słowian (1957)

In the years 1959–1970, Antoniewicz published 10 volumes of the series Pasterstwo Tatr Polskich i Podhala (Shepherding in the Polish Tatra Mountains and Podhale). He also served as the editor of Wiadomości Archeologiczne, Światowid, and Postępy Archeologii during his career.

== Awards, decorations, and honors ==
Antoniewicz received several awards, decorations, and honors, including:

- Commander's Cross of the Order of Polonia Restituta (1938)
- Knight, Officer, and Commander of the Legion of Honour.
- Various Bulgarian and Italian decorations, including the Grand Officer of the Order of the Crown of Italy in 1937
- Yugoslavian honors.
- He was an honorary corresponding member of the Archaeological Society in London and in 1937, a member of the Prehistoric Society in Cambridge
