= Feminist Initiative (Poland) =

Feminist Initiative Inicjatywa Feministyczna
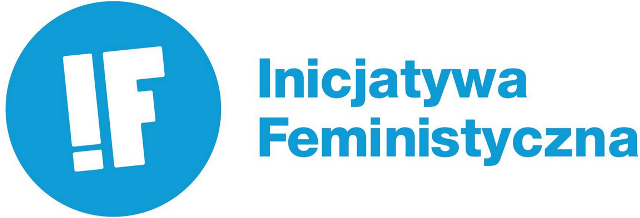
- Leader: Iwona Piątek, Elżbieta Jachlewska, Katarzyna Kądziela
- Founded: 11 January 2007
- Dissolved: 19 January 2020
- Headquarters: al. „Solidarności” 115/2, 00-140 Warszawa Warsaw
- Ideology: Feminism; Women's rights
- National affiliation: European Coalition
- Colours: Blue
- Sejm: 0 / 460
- Senate: 0 / 100
- European Parliament: 0 / 51

Website
- inicjatywafeministyczna.pl

The Feminist Initiative (Polish: Inicjatywa Feministyczna, IF) was a minor centre-left Polish political party advocating for women's rights. It was registered on 11 January 2007 and was known as Women's Party (Polish: Partia Kobiet) until the 27th of August 2016. It was dissolved on 19 January 2020.

This party worked to strengthen and defend women's rights, abortion rights, LGBT rights, asylum rights and refugee rights.

In the 21 October 2007 National Assembly election, the party won 0.28% of the popular vote and no seats in the Sejm or the Senate of Poland. In 2011 general election, the party unsuccessfully stood candidates for election to the Sejm from the Democratic Left Alliance lists. In 2016, "Women's Party" was renamed "Feminist Initiative".

After 13 years of existence, the party was dissolved in early 2020.
