= Mariusz Ziółkowski =

Polish archaeologist and academic

- Born: Mariusz Szczęsny Ziółkowski; October 20, 1953 (age 72); Warsaw, Warsaw Voivodeship, Polish People's Republic
- Known for: Archaeology of the Americas
- Honours: ,

Academic background
- Education: University of Warsaw (1977)
- Thesis: Pachap unanchan: el calendario metropolitano del Imperio Inka

Academic work
- Institutions: Faculty of Archaeology, University of Warsaw
- Website: Mariusz Ziolkowski publications on Academia.edu

Mariusz Ziółkowski (born October 20, 1953, in Warsaw) – Polish archaeologist, professor of humanities, professor at the University of Warsaw, head of the Pre-Columbian Research Center, and associate professor at the Catholic University of Santa María in Arequipa, Peru.

From 1972 to 1977, Ziółkowski studied archaeology and art history at the University of Warsaw. In 1974, he obtained the Diplôme des Hautes Etudes de Langue et Civilisation Françaises in Paris, and in 1986, he defended his doctoral thesis entitled Pachap unanchan: el calendario metropolitano del Imperio Inka at his alma mater. In 1997, he obtained habilitation for his work on Studium La guerra de los wawquis: Los mecanismos y los objetivos de la rivalidad dentro de la élite inca, s. XV – XVI.

Ziółkowski's main research topics include archaeoastronomy, the archaeology and ethnohistory of the Incas, and the methodology and application of absolute dating. He is the author or co-author of 70 scientific papers.

In 1998, Ziółkowski received the Peruvian Order of Merit for Distinguished Service in the rank of officer. In 2023, he was awarded the Golden Medal "Meritorious for Polish Science Sapientia et Veritas".

== Memberships ==
- German Archaeological Institute, Berlin, Germany
- Institute of Andean Studies, Berkeley, California, USA
- Société des Américanistes, Paris, France
- Société Européenne d’Astronomie dans la Culture (SEAC)
- The Explorers Club, New York, USA
- Vice President of the Polish Society for Latin American Studies

== Publications ==
=== Books ===
- M. Ziółkowski and Robert M. Sadowski (eds.), Time and Astronomy in the Inca Empire, BAR International Series 459, Oxford 1989
- M. Ziółkowski and Robert M. Sadowski, La Arqueostaronomia en la investigación de las culturas andinas, Instituto Otavaleño de Antropologia – Banco Central del Ecuador, Quito 1992
- M. Ziółkowski and others Andes. Radiocarbon Database for Bolivia, Ecuador and Peru, Andean Archaeological Mission – Gliwice Radiocarbon Laboratory, Warsaw-Gliwice 1994
- M. Ziółkowski, La guerra de los wawqui. Los mecanismos y los objetivos de la rivalidad dentro de la elite inca, s. XV – XVI., Coleción Abya Yala, vol. 41, Quito 1997
- Oriana Wichrowska and Mariusz Ziółkowski, Iconografía de los Keros de la colección del Museum fur Völkerkunde de Berlin, Boletín de la Misión Arqueológica Andina, vol. 4, Warsaw 2000
- Mariusz Ziółkowski and Luis Augusto Belan Franco (eds.), El Proyecto Arqueológico Condesuyos. Temporadas 1996–1999, Misión Arqueológica Andina de la Universidad de Varsovia, Warsaw 2000
