= Ryszard Mazurowski =

Polish archaeologist

Ryszard Feliks Mazurowski
- Born: 1949
- Citizenship: Poland
- Education: University of Warsaw
- Known for: Archaeological research on the Neolithic periods
- Scientific career
- Fields: Archaeology

Ryszard Feliks Mazurowski (born 1949) is a Polish archaeologist, from Nidzica, known for his contributions to the study of the Neolithic periods in Poland and the Near East.

== Biography ==
Ryszard Feliks Mazurowski has finished habilitation in 1997 based on work "Ground and Pecked Stone Industry in the Pre-pottery Neolithic of Northern Iraq". In 2003 he obtained a title of professor.

He conducted excavations at numerous sites in Vistula Fens regions. He is known from his excavations at Nemrik 9 and Tell Qaramel.

== Selected works ==
- Mazurowski, R. F.; Michczyńska, D. J.; Pazdur, A.; Piotrowska, N. (2009). "Chronology of the early Pre-Pottery Neolithic settlement Tell Qaramel, northern Syria, in the light of radiocarbon dating". Radiocarbon. 51 (2). Cambridge University Press: 771–781. Bibcode:2009Radcb..51..771M. doi:10.1017/S0033822200056083.
- Mazurowski, R. F.; et al. (2007). "Tell qaramel. Excavations 2005". Polish Archaeology in the Mediterranean (XVII). Wydawnictwa Uniwersytetu Warszawskiego: 483–499.
- Mazurowski, R. F. (1985). "Amber treatment workshops of the rzucewo culture in żuławy". Przegląd Archeologiczny. 32. Polska Akademia Nauk. Instytut Historii Kultury Materialnej: 5–60.
