= Andrzej Wierciński =

Polish philosopher

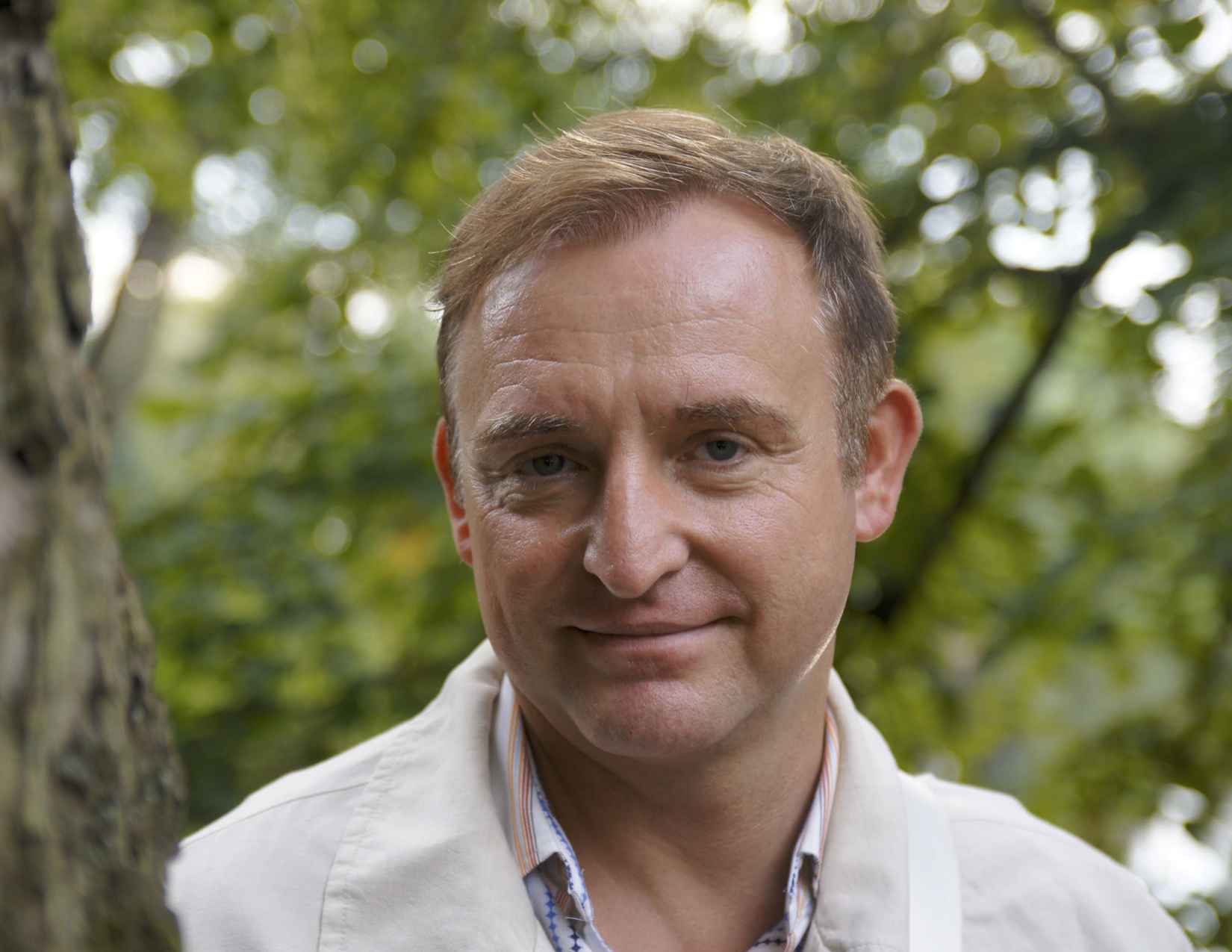
Wierciński in 2014

Andrzej Wierciński is Professor of Liberal Arts at the University of Warsaw, President-Founder (2001) of the International Institute for Hermeneutics (IIH), and President of Agora Hermeneutica (IIH).

== Career ==
Since 2022 he is Professor of Liberal Arts, Faculty of Artes Liberales, at the University of Warsaw.

=== Work ===
Wierciński has edited a row of anthologies, organized conferences, and taken part in public talks. In teaching and research, Wierciński is primarily concerned with lingually oriented phenomenological hermeneutics, with the approaches of Hans-Georg Gadamer, Paul Ricoeur, and the hermeneutic reappropriation of the metaphysics of the Middle Ages.

==== Existentia Hermeneutica ====
Wierciński’s scholarly work examines human existence in relation to others, exploring connections between philosophy, theology, and poetry. His writings address themes related to the human condition and emphasize the role of hermeneutics in understanding human experience. He has also engaged with concepts such as Differenzdenken (“thinking difference”) and existentia hermeneutica, discussing their relevance to philosophical hermeneutics and its role within the humanities. Addressing a vast range of themes, the belonging-together of language and understanding, forgetfulness of Being, self-understanding, metaphysics, Trinity, a-theology.

Following Heidegger, he asserts that language and human understanding belong together: "Human Dasein resides within language: 'Language is the house of Being.'" Wierciński's explication of the relationship between language and understanding comes to its climax in a gloss on Gadamer's revalidation of Augustine's verbum interius. Arguing that Gadamer commences an original engagement with the nature of language as situated in the onto-theological perspective, Wierciński makes a new foray into our apprehension of language, providing a great stimulus for contemporary hermeneutics to rediscover and rearticulate the deep-seated connections between philosophical and theological discourses.

Locating understanding in the practical dimension of life, in our situatedness, Wierciński attempts to revive the significance of phronesis for hermeneutics, highlighting the intimate connections between the unique unrepeatability of the self, his/her existential situation, and radical responsibility (re-spondeo). Pondering the endeavor of hermeneutic to position us in the horizon of thinking about what happens to us and in us when we understand, Wierciński makes a recourse to poetry which he deems "a zealous search for a 'magic formula' in which the whole truth about our existence could be accommodated and shine out brightly." His interpretations of poetry by Hölderlin, Celan, Rilke, and Miłosz that both intersperse and are an integral part of his philosophical-theological discourse claim that the poetic word is the portentous locus of the disclosures of Being.

==== Hermeneutics of Education ====
Instead of offering one more examination of some voguish teaching methodologies or treating us to a purely theoretical stance, Wierciński places hermeneutic hospitality and the prodigy of our being a gift to one another in the very center of educational endeavor, sensitizing us thus to its dialogical, reciprocal, and phronetic dimension. Advocating for the relevance of the hermeneutic triad of understanding, explaining, and applying (subtilitas intelligendi, explicandi et applicandi) for the educational enterprise, Wierciński focuses on application (An-wendung, turning toward something) that results from a dialogic encounter in the teaching environment, in its fundamental and compelling openness to the inexorable μετάνοια. In the fusion of the horizons of the teacher and the student (Horizontverschmelzung), education happens as a hermeneutic conversation and opens a unique possibility to discover the otherwise unfeasible. Education in its conversational character allows us to unravel those areas of meaning and unknot those problems that we would not be able to solve on our own. Therefore, hermeneutic education is the time of a momentous unveiling (revelatio), in which a given phenomenon speaks to us differently each time we undertake the invaluable task of understanding in the true spirit of Gadamer's oft-quoted dictum of immer-anders-verstehen. In its nourishing and strengthening of our need to understand and interpret, education cannot be narrowed down to an instrumental multiplication of the possible and versatile answers to a given question or a facile accumulation of data.

Fostering Heidegger's distinction between calculative and contemplative modes of thinking (berechnendes and besinnliches Denken), Wierciński invites readers to follow the path of vita contemplativa.

==== Hermeneutic Philosophy of Religion ====
He claims philosophy has theology to thank for its unmistakable radiance. Modern philosophers like Kant, Hegel, and Schelling are unthinkable without a theological background, not to mention postmoderns, like Heidegger or Levinas. The necessity to pose philosophical questions and contemplate natural theology became a dominating concern for Christianity and Western philosophy. For Wierciński, hermeneutics thoughtfully pursues a degree of mediation between the two poles of opposed misunderstandings of religion and the secular world. Hermeneutics comes to the aid of a strained relationship like a middleman and becomes ever more conscious of the finitude and historicity of understanding. The divide between theology and philosophy in the Western tradition is simply not a problem that must be overcome. In fact, this divide gave rise to a fruitful legacy that provoked both philosophy and theology to pose hermeneutic questions. On the basis of hermeneutics, Wierciński invites a rejection of Heidegger's call for a radical separation between philosophy and theology. Such a separation is hermeneutically untenable. Independently of how strictly the disciplines attempt to maintain their distance from one another, the opposing influence cannot be avoided. It is already a historical reality. Hermeneutics calls for new and renewed consideration of the problematic connections of theology and philosophy that needs to happen at different levels. Philosophy and theology are not simply static disciplines that must somehow become methodologically associated, but historical disciplines with their own distinctive intellectual histories. The hermeneutic-critical apparatus, narrative identity in particular, is necessary to reclaim, in a constructive articulation, the tradition of respect and connection between philosophy and theology. The space that is to be established anew between philosophy and theology thanks to the contemplation of the incommensurable is an invitation to hermeneutics. That which happens in the no-man's land between the two disciplines is hermeneutics and can only be hermeneutics. It is a hermeneutics between the courage to inquire and the humility to listen. Wierciński claims no final judgment regarding the single proper connection of philosophy and theology but attempts rather to show another way, a way that is to negotiate between the two disciplines. The sole possibility of disclosing this way lies in actually practicing hermeneutics. The incommensurability of philosophy and theology yearns for a myriad of interpretations. Philosophy and theology cannot eliminate such an open space for the manifold of interpretations, not even with reference to the distance between the two. Neither can one forbid the other from understanding and interpreting their connection differently.

== Selected bibliography ==
=== Monographs ===
- Hermeneutics of Education: Exploring and Experiencing the Unpredictability of Education (Zürich: LIT Verlag, 2019).
- Existentia Hermeneutica: Understanding as the Mode of Being in the World (Zürich: LIT Verlag, 2019).
- Hermeneutics between Philosophy and Theology: The Imperative to Think the Incommensurable (Münster: LIT Verlag, 2010).
- Philosophizing with Gustav Siewerth: A New German Edition with Facing Translation of "Das Sein als Gleichnis Gottes"/"Being as Likeness of God," And A Study, "From Metaphor and Indication to Icon: The Centrality of the Notion of Verbum in Hans-Georg Gadamer, Bernard Lonergan, and Gustav Siewerth" (Konstanz: Verlag Gustav Siewerth Gesellschaft, 2005).
- Inspired Metaphysics? Gustav Siewerth's Hermeneutic Reading of the Onto-Theological Tradition (Toronto: The Hermeneutic Press, 2003).
- Das Miteinander: Grundzüge einer Sorge um den Menschen in seinem Unterwegssein (Guernsey: Elan & Son, 1997).
- Der Dichter in seinem Dichtersein: Versuch einer philosophisch-theologischen Deutung des Dichterseins am Beispiel von Czesław Miłosz (Frankfurt a.M.: Peter Lang, 1997).
- Die scholastischen Vorbedingungen der Metaphysik Gustav Siewerths: Eine historisch-kritische Studie mit Bezug auf die Seinsvergessenheitstheorie von Martin Heidegger (Frankfurt a.M.: Peter Lang, 1991).
- Scholastyczne uwarunkowania metafizyki Gustawa Siewertha: Studium historyczno-krytyczne w aspekcie teorii "niepamięci bytu" Martina Heideggera (Wadhurst: Elan & Son, 1990).
- Über die Differenz im Sein: Metaphysische Überlegungen zu Gustav Siewerths Werk (Frankfurt a.M.: Peter Lang, 1989).
