= Stefan Krukowski =

Polish archaeologist (1890–1982)

Stefan Wincenty Krukowski (born January 22, 1890, in Mszczonów, died on May 1, 1982, in Warsaw) was a Polish archaeologist specialist in the Palaeolithic, Mesolithic and Neolithic periods.

== Biography ==
He obtained the title of professor in 1956 and conducted research in the field of Paleolithic and Mesolithic archaeology. He led archaeological work in Russia and, starting from 1925, conducted research in the Neolithic flint mine of Krzemionki Opatowskie, focusing on banded flint. Krukowski was a self-taught archaeologist. During the German occupation of Lviv, he worked as a feeder of healthy lice at the Institute for Research on Spotted Typhus and Viruses under Professor Rudolf Weigl.

== Selected publications ==
- Prehistoria ziem polskich (Prehistory of Polish Lands), 1939
- Krzemionki Opatowskie, 1939
- Skam 71. Zbiór rozpraw prahistorycznych (Skam 71. Collection of Prehistoric Essays), 1976
