= State Museum of Archaeology in Warsaw =

Archæological museum in Poland

Coordinates: 52°14′44″N 21°0′5″E

- Państwowe Muzeum Archeologiczne w Warszawie

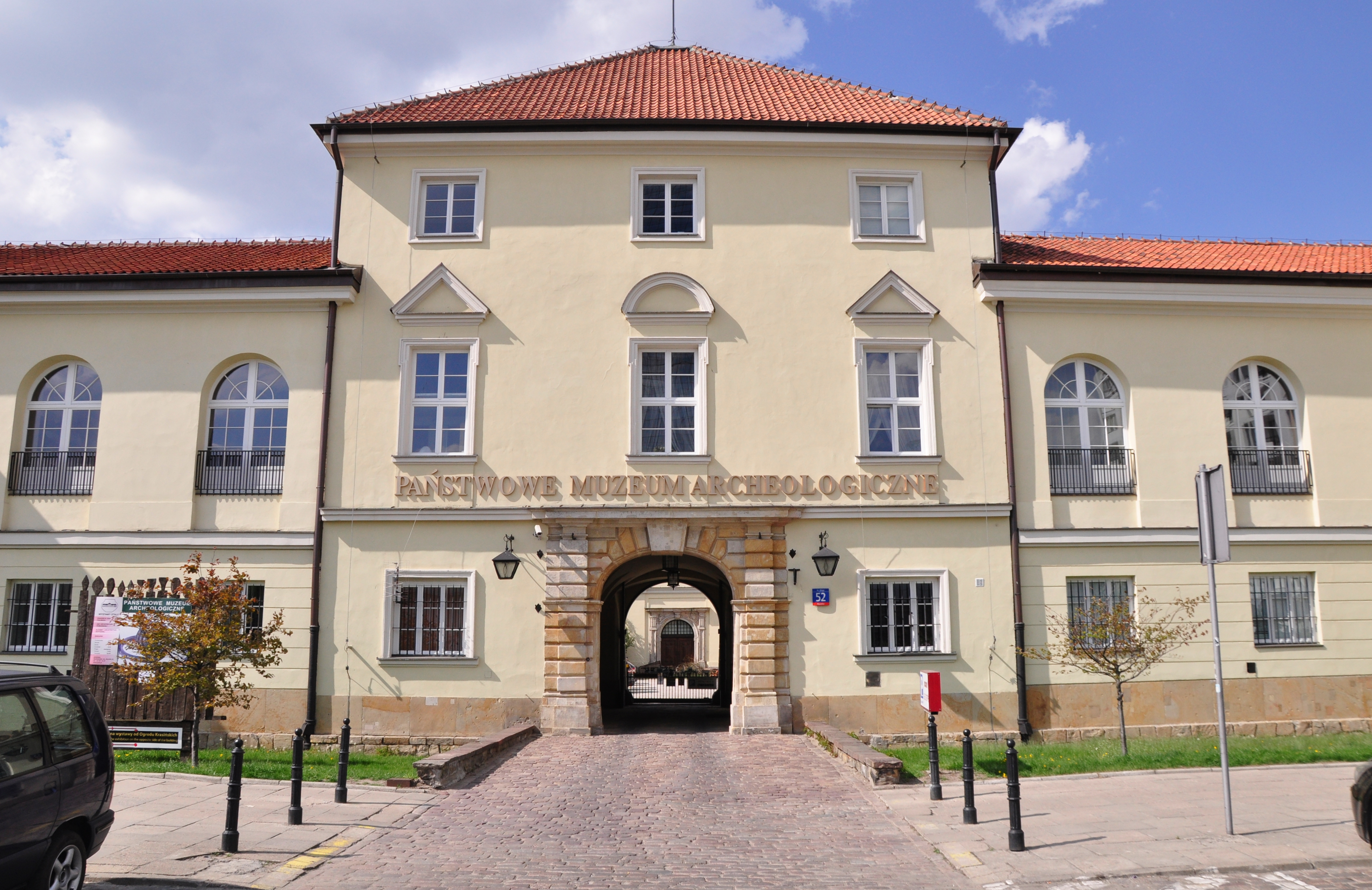
- Former name: Staatliches Archäologisches Museum (1939-1945)
- Established: 1928
- Location: Długa 52; Warsaw, Poland
- Type: Archæology museum
- Director: Wojciech Brzeziński (2001-present)
- Public transit access: Ratusz Arsenał
- Website: pma.pl

The State Museum of Archaeology in Warsaw (Polish: Państwowe Muzeum Archeologiczne w Warszawie) is a museum located in the former Royal Arsenal in Warsaw, Poland. The museum was established in 1923 and has been in its current location since 1958. The research library of the museum holds more than 75,000 volumes.

== Activities of the museum ==
The State Museum of Archaeology organises excavations in different parts of Poland, develops and publishes the results of research, including those from other museums and institutions related to archæology.

It promotes archæology and prehistory, both on its own premises and at other museums, including foreign ones. The museum provides lessons, film screenings, and demonstrations. Since 1995, the museum, along with the University of Warsaw, has organised an archaeological festival.

In 2014, the museum was modernised and includes detailed displays in both Polish and English. In 2023, the museum completed additional renovations.

In 2025, the museum's exhibition of "What was before the palace? The archaeology of the Sanniki park" received an award of distinction at the Masovian Museum Events - Wierzba competition.
