= Robert M. Walter =

Polish anthroposophist and astrologer

Robert Maria Walter (born 7 November 1908 in Lvov, died 19 November 1981 in Komorow near Warsaw) was a Polish anthroposophist, astrologer, homeopath and initiate.

== Parents ==
His paternal grandfather was a judge, and at the same time musician and composer, author of regular musical reviews. His father also a judge, but in his spare time a passionate musician who regularly corresponded with a number of leading contemporary musicians and was an adherent of Arthur Schopenhauer's philosophy. In contrast to his father who represented clear, rational thinking, Walter's mother was interested in esotericism and frequented esoteric groups and lectures.

== Childhood and youth ==
As a child Walter was described as quiet and obedient: very much in contrast to his older brother who had an explosive temperament and a tendency to get involved in fights. At the age of two Robert contracted polio, became paralysed for a time, and his legs remained weak for the rest of his life. Yet, significantly, he did not despair over this disability, but, on the contrary, was later eager to take part in mountain trekking. At the age of 9 he started to play the violin, later he also learnt to play the piano.

At school he initially did not excel and was rather a challenge to his teachers. Yet already as a child he was perceived by his surrounding as an unusual personality: unusually serious, capable of deep reflection, somebody who showed great promise. His peers tended to regard him as a great authority. His mother wrote in a letter to her then eleven-year-old son: "I miss your quiet, wise presence". Already at an early age he showed lively interest for all kinds of esoteric knowledge (often inspired by the books he obtained from his mother) and astrology. He founded his own astrological study group at the age of 16. He remained faithful to this interest until the end of his life. Robert Walter's lukewarm attitude to his studies changed when he was sent to the first Waldorf School in Stuttgart in 1927. He stayed there for only one year, but during that time caught fire for learning, especially mathematics, yet he also retained his love for music, composed a sonata for piano and violin and reflected on the Christian dimension of music.

Walter achieved certain renown among his peers through his ability to repair watches and alarm clocks. He also exhibited a deep passion for books and learning. He described himself as "philobiblion" (lover of books) and always had a feeling that his knowledge on any given subject was not sufficient. Yet perhaps his most astonishing quality at the time was his deep and serious interest in the path of spiritual development. He studied avidly the central book of Rudolf Steiner on the subject ("Knowledge of the Higher Worlds and Its Attainment") as well as the relevant chapters of Steiner's "Occult Science" and described in a letter to his father with what intensity he worked on these indications. He claimed that he did not have any particular talent for clairvoyance and maintained that achieving initiation is in principle not more demanding than obtaining a PhD in any given subject. His school report at the end of the school year 1928 was generally very good and in mathematics and physics he came at the top of his class. His mathematics and physics teacher was Dr Walter Johannes Stein, one of the most prominent pupils of Rudolf Steiner. After his return to Poland young Robert Walter corresponded with Stein, who was 17 years his senior, for a number of years.

== Business ventures ==
Robert Walter was hoping to enrol at a university in Germany and to study natural sciences, mathematics, astronomy, or possibly medicine, yet the precarious financial situation of his parents crossed these plans and he had to return to Poland. He wanted to help his parents financially and so he turned to experiments in and production of cosmetics. His perfume creations were so successful that they were traded with a fictitious cover story that the recipes were obtained from famous French firms. Finally, a cosmetics firm under the name "Orient" was founded in his name in Poznan, and later transferred to Warsaw. All that time Robert Walter was hoping that his business ventures would enable him to study abroad, the hopes that proved to be futile. It is important in this context to stress that despite his esoteric interests Robert Walter was unusually "down to earth": extremely precise, punctual and reliable, with a very keen practical and business sense, qualities which represented the opposite of the qualities of his parents. Despite deep character differences he maintained very good relationships with his parents, particularly with his mother, to whom he always had a warm, heartfelt devotion. In 1932 Walter finally abandoned his university ambitions even in Poland. Instead, he was dragged into joint activities with his mother and became co-owner and director (and above all the product designer) of the cosmetics factory "Deva" in Warsaw, which could be regarded as a continuation of "Orient". However, this venture was not limited to reproductions of Eastern cosmetics and sold also its own creations. Over the next two years, "Deva" managed by Walter's able hand began to thrive, thanks to which he became very wealthy, yet used his wealth not to lead a luxurious lifestyle, but to expand his library (he would even purchase 16th century manuscripts) which, though housed in his private flat, was entirely open to the public.

Walter's increased wealth also led to the expansion of the circle of his acquaintances, yet despite the pressure of time required to run the company and to fulfil sporadic social duties, he continued to study the fields of knowledge he was interested in, that is not only anthroposophy and astrology, but also the broadly understood history of culture. Significantly, though he described himself as a "loner" he consciously strove to maintain good, conflict-free relationships with people of very divergent outlooks and persuasions. Moreover, he would also support financially – initially quoting the source, later also anonymously – many poor people, restricting his private expenditure to the necessary minimum. His wealth and personal charm attracted many beautiful women, yet he never entered into any romantic relationship for as he revealed much later already as a child he felt "married to God". Parallel to his business and social duties Robert Walter got involved on the one hand in some esoteric work within the circles of Polish masonry, and on the other, and despite the utter failure of his academic ambitions, in scientific astronomical work in collaboration with leading Polish astronomers. In particular he worked out formulas for calculating the positions of Uranus and Pluto in the period between 3000 BC until 4000 AD. These formulas are used even today.

== WWII ==
During the German occupation, when all cultural life in Poland came to a standstill, Robert Walter managed to continue his scientific work and at the same time to deepen his esoteric life. He would carry out his meditation exercises even under most adverse circumstances. During the Warsaw Uprising of 1944 a bomb hit the building in which he lived. As it happened, Walter was immersed in meditation at that moment and almost miraculously survived unscathed: the sofa, on which he lay ended up on top of a pile of rubble. It was also around the time of the Uprising that Walter committed his, as he described it, biggest esoteric mistake. He recounted later that one day in a state of clairvoyant consciousness he met a person who had earlier died in a concentration camp, but for various reasons was not aware of that fact and regarded himself as still alive. That person complained to Robert Walter (whom he "saw") that his (dead person's) friends did not seem to notice him and did not react to his approaches. To that Walter responded by saying: "But you are dead!", which produced a state of shock in that person.

On an exoteric level Walter as well as his whole family were active in attempts at saving the Polish Jews from the occupiers. Walter's older brother, Ryszard, was also involved in the activities of the Polish underground. He was caught by the Germans and tortured, but survived the war.

== Post war: activity as an expert, university course, cultural centre ==
What also survived the war, and moreover practically unscathed, was Walter's library and the supplies of his firm's raw materials. Walter moved with his belongings to a villa of his friends in Komorow in the vicinity of Warsaw, sold the astronomical part of his library for, as he said, he had studied astronomy and higher mathematics only to find out how difficult modern science was, set up a laboratory in the villa and embarked on a new existence producing expertises for perfume, foodstuffs and soap industries. He withdrew from his former firm for, as he said, the industrial activities were too time-consuming and he wanted to devote all his energies to scientific work. However, he had to earn enough to support not only himself but also his parents who became jobless after the war.

In 1946, at the age of almost 40, Walter enrolled at the University of Warsaw yet was not very impressed by the quality of teaching and the academic abilities of his fellow students. Nonetheless, the villa in Komorow became a centre of flourishing intellectual life. Every Sunday dozens of people – older or younger – came to it to make use of Walter's library or to seek his advice in the matters of spiritual or simply intellectual life. One of these visitors was Nina Andrycz, one of the leading Polish actresses of the time and the wife of Jozef Cyrankiewicz, then Prime Minister of Poland. Andrycz wrote in her diary that she had become Walter's pupil (she was born in 1912, about 39 at the time). Interestingly he encouraged her to read Lao Tse, not Rudolf Steiner. Incidentally, Walter learned Chinese to be able to study Lao Tse in the original, for he did not trust the translations. Cyrankiewicz himself would also seek Walter's advice e.g. concerning his marriage. While Andrycz or Cyrankiewicz or both were at Walter's, dark cars of the state security attachment would be stationed outside the villa. Cyrankiewicz's visits also brought out an interesting aspect of Walter's personality to the fore. Walter never drank alcohol for he did not like it, yet during these meetings he was forced to drink vodka because a meeting with Cyrankiewicz and without alcohol was not at all conceivable. Hence, with his "weak head" and lacking experience he had to practice drinking. He treated this as a form of mortification: an exercise in overcoming his own reluctance.

Walter's handwriting was significantly changed after the war: it became smaller, finer, in a way humbler. This fact seems to indicate that during the war Walter was intensively working on will exercises as described by Rudolf Steiner e.g. in his "Occult Science", exercises necessary to achieve the highest stage of supersensible cognition referred to in Steiner's system as "Intuition".

== Decision and its aftermath ==
In 1952 he was working on his master's thesis in the field of psychology of sensations of smell (he was hoping to get an appointment at the Polish Academy of Sciences and so combine his private life with scientific research) when a momentous turn of his destiny occurred. Walter inherited an unusually sturdy physical constitution from his parents – his father was a member of an athletes' club and yet could not win a hand-wrestling match against his wife – which proved to be an obstacle for Walter in carrying out certain esoteric exercises. In order to achieve the desired results in this sphere a weakening of Walter's physical constitution was necessary. In December 1951, around Christmas, there took place a "conference" in the spiritual worlds to which Walter got "invited". He complained that he could not achieve what he should and so it was agreed that because he could not and yet he should, special treatments had to be implemented. Walter understood what destiny procedures were being prepared for him and he agreed to them. In the night from 9th to 10 May 1952 he was arrested and taken to prison accused of spying. It should be added that Walter was not the only person arrested at that time. Security forces secretly occupied the villa in which Walter lived until 12 May and arrested every person who came there not suspecting the trap. One can assume that the aim of the communist authorities in taking that step was not only to detain Walter, but more generally to liquidate an independent centre of intellectual life in Poland.

Walter was sent to a death cell and interrogated and tortured for one and a half years. In 1954 he was transferred to an ordinary cell which he shared with the former Polish consul in France, Juliusz Wilczur-Garztecki. Garztecki reported later two interesting details concerning the impressions he gained of Walter. Firstly, he said that Walter had been able to quote passages from Rudolf Steiner's central book on the path of esoteric training ("Knowledge of the Higher Worlds and Its Attainment" cf. above) verbatim; and secondly, he stated that Walter had had little esteem for clairvoyance as such. He regarded clairvoyance as a kind of bonus, the main aim of the esoteric path being the ordering of one's psyche. One important aspect of such an "ordering" was according to Walter the necessity of attainment of an ordered, internally consistent and logical world view ("Weltanschauung"). When this necessity was put in question he once replied "It's not my fault that spiritual beings demand this". He also insisted that before one wants to start on the anthroposophical path of inner development one should first become "a contemporary intellectual".

Walter was released from prison on 30 October 1954. A physician who examined him after his release from prison reported symptoms of cardiovascular failure with swelling of the legs, dull tones in the heart, symptoms of angina pectoris, paroxysmal stomach pains, purulent discharge from the ears, skin blemishes (...) with purulent discharge, inflammation of the left sciatic nerve, and significant weakness of the lower limbs, expressed as difficulty walking and severe pains. Walter himself looked at that period of his life in the following way:

"I remained [in prison] for two and a half years, my body weakened, it deteriorated in terms of health to such an extent that my development in the following decades became somewhat easier. Anyway, there, in the cell, I could meditate and do my exercises."

In a letter to his mother, written in January 1955, he stated:

"As for my struggles, Mother shouldn't worry too much. I am going through

seven unpleasant years. [Five are behind me and] I will manage to struggle through two more somehow. My inner difficulties come from the fact that I seek spiritual states and insights, and these are bought with suffering. Each country has its own currency."

Despite this accepting attitude towards his suffering something had to be done to improve his health at least to the extent which would enable Walter a more or less normal existence. As his weakened immune system did not tolerate chemical medicines, the only possibility was a homeopathic treatment. Walter sought to be treated in the main anthroposophical clinic in Arlesheim, Switzerland and in a court-case brought against the state he attempted to obtain from the state reimbursement for its costs. A compensation was granted to him but in a way typical for that time it covered no more than a small amount of all his losses which included not only the costs of treatment in Switzerland, but also the need to renovate the laboratory, repurchase of his chemical raw materials, and three years of lost earnings, not to mention moral losses resulting from the forfeited master's degree at the university and the subsequent inability to work scientifically.

== Arlesheim: the meeting with the Guardian of the Threshold, an Initiate ==
In 1956 Walter's financial situation was so bad that he was forced to start selling parts of his library and he seemed to be genuinely downcast. Fortunately in August 1958 he finally obtained state financial support and was able to travel to Switzerland. His time in Arlesheim was free from financial concerns and devoted exclusively to physical healing and spiritual growth. He also attempted to establish business contacts, which, however, proved not particularly successful. Far more significant was his inner development. According to an entry in his diary of 28 September 1958 he then experienced what is described in anthroposophical literature as the meeting with the Guardian of the Threshold: a spiritual being who prohibits conscious entry into the spiritual world to people who have not mastered their desires and emotions.

It is to be surmised that it is at that juncture of his life that Walter became an initiate, i.e. a person who not only has some insight into the reality of the spiritual world and into the destinies of people more or less directly after their deaths, but retains his or her full consciousness during the periods of his or her sojourn in the spiritual worlds, is aware of their superhuman inhabitants: spiritual beings of various hierarchies, and ultimately can follow the past and future incarnations of human beings as well as of the planet Earth itself.

== Later years ==
Walter health improved substantially in Arlesheim and when he returned to Poland and Komorow in 1959 he was able to lead a more or less normal life again. The following years, although sometimes difficult on the financial side, proceeded in a more regular fashion without great, unpleasant, external blows of fate. Unfortunately, Walter's health quickly returned to "normal", i.e. it deteriorated under the pressure of the burden of work: Walter would spend ten hours a day in the laboratory although gradually, with age, he was only able to work less and less efficiently as he progressively lost strength. A few years after the Arlesheim period Komorow became populated once again by knowledge seekers, for whom Walter straightened their life's paths and to whom he gave his advice.

Walter was untiring in his readiness to help. Asked once until when one could visit him on a given day he replied: "Until midnight, because later it is already the next day". Yet he was not only involved in personal destinies of people surrounding him. He was equally active on the social level: from its founding meeting in 1965 until his death he was the chairman of the Homeopathic Society in Poland, a councillor of the Komorow Regional Council, a member of the steering committee of the local branch of the Warsaw Committee for Prevention of Alcoholism, member of the Circle of Friends of the Library of Maria Dabrowska and many other organizations. He was responsive to all forms of needs of the people in his surroundings, including their physical needs. In order to come to terms with all his duties he would sleep little. He would go to bed at midnight or even later and get up at five.

== Astrology, homeopathy ==
Walter also became also an astrologer and was regarded as one of the leading authorities in this area in Poland. One of his aspirations was to formulate the cognitive conditions under which astrology could again become a field of university research. He wanted to enable the dethroned former "queen" of sciences to enter again into the circle of investigations of the highest scientific quality, and protect it against amateurism which breeds its popularity from ignorance and prejudices of the masses. Another of his strivings in this field was to reconcile astrological and psychological diagnosis of personality. He was of the opinion that both disciplines produce similar diagnoses though use different concepts. He also authored a synthetic astrological typology which he presented in a lecture to the Polish Psychological Society and which was published posthumously in 1994.

In 2000 one of the leading Polish newspapers published an article by Polish psychologist, psychotherapist and author Wojciech Eichelberger, in which Eichelberger described the meeting with Robert Walter as the moment when he came to believe in astrology. Both men agreed to carry out a simple experiment: Eichelberger supplied Walter with hours, dates, places of birth and sex of three people who were his patients without revealing their names. Three weeks later the men met again and each of them read his analysis of those people. Eichelberger admitted with astonishment that two of Walter's analyses were as accurate as his own. "I could not believe my ears, hearing that a man who had never seen the people he talked about presented complex, intimate details of their lives and dates of the most important events of their lives and in elegant language described the essence of their psychological problems".

Of lesser importance but nevertheless also significant was Walter's involvement in homeopathy. It is known that he studied this discipline already after his imprisonment, and later became quite proficient in that field, able to successfully prescribe homeopathic medicaments himself. As mentioned before, he also became the chairman of the Homeopathic Society in Poland. His activities in that field are extensively described by a well-known Polish homeopath, Stanislaw Jedrzejczyk.

== Change of perspective ==
Walter's approach to spirituality took a significant shift towards the end of his life. As noted before, Walter was not only profoundly familiar with Rudolf Steiner's anthroposophy, indeed, in Poland he was recognized as the supreme authority in this area, but he also achieved his insight into the spiritual world pursuing the methods described by Rudolf Steiner. Indeed, he maintained that he had achieved this insight in order to verify Steiner's claims. "Someone had to do it" he once said. Yet towards the end of his life, beginning perhaps in the 1970s, he seems to have begun to question Steiner's characterization of the relationship between Christ and human beings. Christ and His role in the evolution of humanity is undoubtedly central for Steiner, indeed, he describes the "Mystery of Golgotha" as the pivotal point of that evolution, as the event which gives meaning to the whole earthly existence of humanity, yet the being of Christ is conspicuously absent on the path of anthroposophical initiation and appears to the initiate only at the very end of his or her efforts. Walter put his finger on this fact in a questioning way. In a private conversation he once said:

If you look at Steiner' exercise technique [you see clearly], there is a man working on himself, developing his abilities, developing higher and higher [stages of] clairvoyance. At a certain high point, indeed Steiner leads to that point, the man encounters Christ. And Steiner says "This is it" [the pinnacle of achievement]. But what does this meeting look like? It's pretty different than in Catholicism where Christ is veritably seeking the man. How is it for the Catholics? There you hear that if a man would only turn to Christ in the last minute before death, Christ rushes to save him because he loves [him]. And how do you have the same scene at Steiner's? Steiner brings you to see Christ. But how does the meeting look like? Christ says: "Well, if you offer all your strength to human development, so perhaps you will be able to unite with me". Ma'am, this is a completely different story!

At that stage of his life Walter began to stress the significance and virtues of the so-called naïve religiosity. He supported his view e.g. by referring to the destiny of a simple gardener (whom he had known since his childhood) in that person's life after death. That gardener went through the posthumous stages of his existence with greatest ease. He was a man of very simple religiosity, hardly judgmental, focused on his work, not looking at the flaws of the local priest, whom the people of his parish loudly criticised. Referring to such an easy path for a man without learning yet devoted to the Church and God in pure affection Walter said that he had had to spend twenty years to achieve as much as that gardener was given "for free" immediately after he died for pure trust. Walter would contrast this attitude with the attitude of even ardent anthroposophists. In one of the seminars given towards the end of his life Walter said:

I knew […] an anthroposophist who would read one lecture of Dr. Steiner every evening, simply as a [kind of] gourmet: it tasted so good. [… A]fter death it didn't look very inspiring. And he was such an anthroposophist that he would even give lectures. And this yearning for this tasty, say, reading, […] starts hitting him ... and the book is not there, and the soul squeaks.

For this reason, towards the end of his life Walter began to propagate religiousness in the spirit of Sister Faustyna Kowalska (officially today: Saint Maria Faustyna Kowalska of the Blessed Sacrament) and her attitude "Jesus, I trust in You". Walter did not claim that this approach could be turned into a general law, but he depicted it as an attitude towards God which should be at the root of everything else, regardless of other matters. Altruism cannot be given to a man in the form of knowledge. Such attitude must develop out of the impulse of the inmost free will of a person. Yet Walter saw altruism as one of the most important features of a Christian attitude towards God.

At that stage Walter also sharply differentiated between occultism and Christianity. He maintained that occultists do not have access to Christ even if they are "Christian" occultists, for then though they have access to Him, He "does not want to have access to them". Walter considered the occultists' pursuit of spiritual sensations, of achieving the vision of supersensible worlds as confusing means with goals. As he would often say: To achieve transcendental experience is extremely easy and there are many techniques to do this, but one does not get better from the amount of perception, and therefore according to Walter Steiner in his writings did not emphasize enough the basic task of man, which could be expressed in simple words: fulfilling the ideal of the Good.

People who knew him well at that time report that having read the diary of Sister Faustyna (who died in 1938) Walter began to cooperate with her closely. He said that Sister Faustyna had taught him humility by "putting her foot on his head". The notes he made in the last three years of his life seem to indicate that during that period he was receiving direct instructions from Christ. He would often prostrate himself on the floor as if in atonement for the sins of his own or perhaps more likely of other people. He would recite Sister Faustyna's Chaplet to the Divine Mercy (in Polish: "Koronka do Miłosierdzia Bożego"), he also often took on himself the sufferings of other people. In one conversation Walter described this "procedure" in the typical for him entirely unpretentious fashion in the following way:

So [a person] comes [to me], he is directed here by his guardian angel, or someone else. Catholics say by simplification "by God" – I distinguish here certain details. A day or two before his visit in the morning or at night, I get a portion of his depression.

- And so you know that he is to come?

- I know on the basis of this depression that someone is coming, and more or less who it will be. I'm experiencing [his state], licking out his unpleasant mess, which this person made of himself because he is helpless against himself and against the world and against his environment. Therefore, because I took on a piece of his soul, I sucked in his dirty blood, at this moment I have access to him in a way different than through verbal, whether through scientific, or through mental or psychological action. I have a different access. Because insofar as I suffered for him, I have the right to him. If I have suffered five ounces, I am five ounces his saviour, because I crucify myself for him. And so I have the right to save him for five ounces or maybe ten. You know, this is a power which one is given over other people. But one is not allowed to misuse it.

Maciej Puczynski, the author of the most comprehensive extant biography of Robert Walter from which it was quoted extensively here, asserts on that basis that at the end of his life Walter ceased to be a pupil of Rudolf Steiner and became a pupil of Christ.

== Sources ==
- Jablonski, Grzegorz: A collection of 7 CDs recorded from tapes being recordings of meetings of Robert Walter with Janina Borzdyńska, a religious sister from Laski, in the apartment of Jablonski. Transcribed by Jablonski: 33 pages.
- Jędrzejczyk, Stanisław (2001): „O pasji upowszechniania homeopatii", [in:] „Homeopatia polska", Rok X, nr specjalny. O działalności Roberta Waltera w Polskim Towarzystwie homeopatycznym. (downloaded on 2019/11/17).
- Miniewicz, Sonia (2012): Robert Walter – Mistrz z Komorowa (Robert Walter – The Master from Komorow). Onet Kultura. Published online 29 October 2012, (downloaded on 2019/11/02).
- Puczynski, Maciej (2000): A collection of 22 CDs recorded from tapes recorded during anthroposophical seminars and conversations held by Robert M. Walter with various audiences. Recorded by Andrzej Bernaciak in the years 1980–81, transcribed and cataloged by Maciej Puczyński: 160 pages.
- Puczynski, Maciej (2004): O zyciu Roberta Waltera. Praca magisterska, Warszawa 2004. About the Life of Robert Walter. Master Thesis, Warsaw 2004. Unpublished manuscript.
- Steiner, Rudolf (1947): Knowledge of the Higher Worlds and Its Attainment, Anthroposophic Press.
- Steiner, Rudolf (1997): Occult Science, Anthroposophic Press.
- Steiner, Rudolf (1990): Vorstufen zum Mysterium von Golgatha. Rudolf Steiner Verlag, Dornach/Schweiz.
