= Witold Hensel =

Polish archaeologist

Witold Maria Hensel (March 29, 1917 in Gniezno – November 22, 2008 in Warsaw) was a Polish archaeologist. He was a member of the Polish Academy of Sciences and a member of the Sejm in PRL (SD, 1985–1989).

== Publications ==
- Archaeological research in Poland; by Witold Hensel and Aleksander Gieysztor, Warsaw : Polonia Pub. House, 1958. (Available at Warburg Institute)
- The Origins of Western and Eastern Slav Towns, Witold Hensel, World Archaeology, Vol. 1, No. 1, Recent Work and New Approaches (Jun., 1969), pp. 51–60
- Polska Starożytna (En:ancient Poland); by Witold Hensel; January 1988, Book, 3rd edition ISBN 83-04-02172-2; ISBN 978-83-04-02172-3
- Excavations of Neolithic and Early Bronze Age Sites in South-Eastern Poland;by Sarunas Milisauskas, Witold Hensel, Instytut Historii Kultury Materialnej (Polska Akademia Nauk); January 1985; Paperback ISBN 83-04-01995-7; ISBN 978-83-04-01995-9
- Przemiany Ludnościowe I Kulturowe I Tysiaclecia P.N.E. Na Ziemiach Miedzy Odra a Dnieprem: Materiay Z Polsko-Radzieckiego Sympozjum Paleodemograficznego, Warszawa, 6-9 Grudnia 1977 by Polska Akademia Nauk, Witold Hensel; January 1983, Book;ISBN 83-04-01179-4;ISBN 978-83-04-01179-3
- Archeologia Medioevale Polacca in Italia; by Witold Hensel, Stanisaw Tabaczynski; January 1981, Book ISBN 83-04-01105-0; ISBN 978-83-04-01105-2
