= Konrad Jażdżewski =

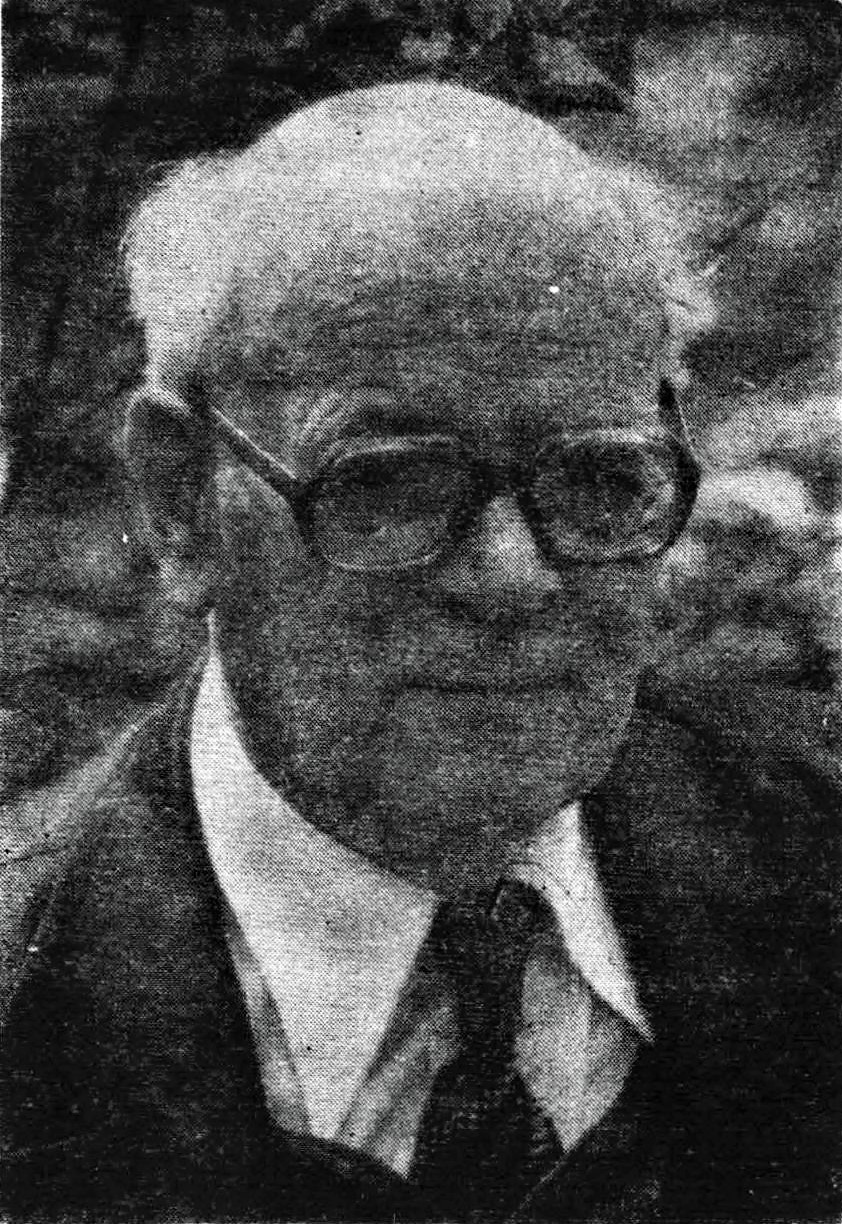
Konrad Jażdżewski

Konrad Jażdżewski (23 November 1908 in Kluczbork - 21 April 1985 in Łódź) was a Polish professor of archeology, doctor honoris causa at the University of Łódź. He was the first to conduct excavations at Brześć Kujawski.

== Publications ==
- JAZDZEWSKI, KONRAD. Poland. 240 pp. with 77 photos, 27 line drawings, 3 maps, & 3 tables, 8vo, cloth. New York, Praeger, 1965. Ancient People and Places Series.
- Konrad Jażdżewski, Urgeschichte Mitteleuropas (Wrocław 1984).
- Archaeological Research on course of the new investments - Interstate Highways A-1 and A-2, by foundation of Konrad Jażdżewski Institute of archeology and Anthropology
