= Erazm Majewski =

Polish archaeologist, biologist (1858–1922)

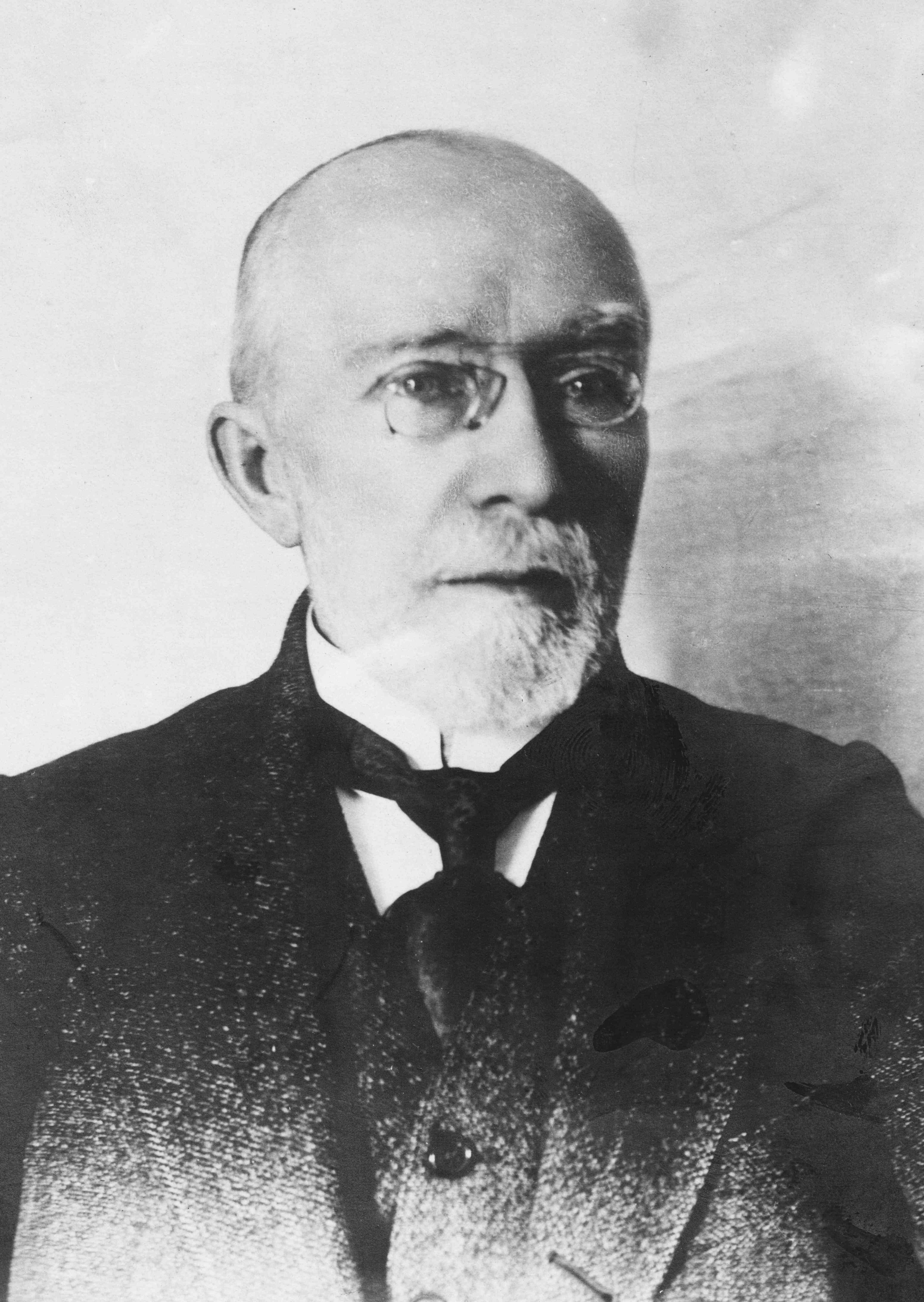
- Born: 2 June 1858; Lublin
- Died: 14 November 1922 (aged 64)
- Spouse: Lucyna Majewska

Erazm Majewski (2 June 1858 — 14 November 1922) was a Polish archaeologist, biologist, sociologist, philosopher, economist, ethnographer, and novelist. He laid the foundations of archaeology in Poland; he was a pioneer in the protection of archaeological artefacts in the Polish lands.

== Biography ==
Erazm Majewski was born on 2 June 1858, in Lublin, to Hipolit Majewski and Maria Zembrowskich. He started school in Lublin and then continued in Warsaw after his family moved there.

Majewski's first scientific interests were in the field of natural science. He wrote a work entitled Neuroptera Polonica, which was the first systematic description of vein-winged insects, and Słownik nazwisk zoologicznych polskich, in which he systematised and enriched the natural science terminology. It was not until around 1891 that he became interested in ethnography and archaeology. Around 1906, influenced by the Russian Revolution of 1905, he turned his attention to the problems of sociology.

Although he studied at the Faculty of Natural Sciences at the University of Warsaw, he was self-taught in archaeology and based his knowledge on books. He also educated himself while travelling, when he tried to acquire artefacts by purchase or exchange. In archaeology, his interests manifested themselves in exploring the theoretical foundations and methodology of archaeology, as well as the study of the Stone Age and the Slavs. He conducted research in the philosophy of culture, linking prehistory with anthropogenesis and the theory of culture, which he defined as civilisation. He produced numerous works, which he published in the Universe, Gazeta Polska and Wędrowiec. In this way he wanted to promote archaeology. In 1899 he founded the yearbook Światowit devoted to prehistoric and Slavic archaeology (it was a journal of European standard).

Majewski was a member of the Warsaw Scientific Society, the International Institute of Sociology and a foreign correspondent of the Anthropological Society; during the Second Republic he was president of the State Conservators of Prehistoric Monuments, and in 1919 was appointed head of the Department of Prehistoric Archaeology at the University of Warsaw.

Majewski wrote the four-volume work Science of Civilisation, the ideas and views that he presented there influenced many future scholars:

- Prolegomena i podstawy do filozofii dziejów i socjologii (The science of civilisation, outlines and foundations for a philosophy of history and sociology), 1908;
- Teoria człowieka i cywilizacji (Theory of Man and Civilisation), 1910;
- Nauka o cywilizacji-kapitał (Theory of Civilisation and Capital), 1914;
- Narodziny i rozwój ducha na Ziemi, 1923 (was released post-mortem under the editorship of M. Massoniusa).

Majewski also wrote two popular adventure/science-fiction novels. His 1890 Doktor Muchołapski. Fantastyczne przygody w świecie owadów (Doctor Flycatcher. The Fantastic Adventures in the World of Insects) was an early example of size change in fiction. The sequel, 1896's Profesor Przedpotopowicz. W otchłaniach czasu (Professor Predeluge. In the Depths of Time) was an early depiction of time travel in fiction.

=== Collection ===
On 27 September 1908 Majewski created the first Prehistoric Museum from his collections in the building of the Society for the Encouragement of Fine Arts.

On 3 June 1921, Majewski's private archaeological collection was presented to the Warsaw Scientific Society. Later it was turned into the E. Majewski Museum of Prehistory in Palace Staszic at Nowy Świat 72 in Warsaw. After the World War II it was merged into the State Archaeological Museum.

== Sources ==
- Krajewska, Maria (2008). "The Legacy of Erazm Majewski (1858-1922) in the Documentations Department of the State Archaeological Museum in Warsaw. On His 150th Birthday Anniversary". Wiadomości Archeologiczne. LX (60): 9–95.
- Krajewska, Maria (2010). "Erazm Majewski (1858-1922)" (PDF). MAZOWSZE Studia Regionalne (III): 220–227.
- Adamek, Ludwik; Radwan-Pragłowski, Janusz (2006). "Ludwik Gumplowicz: A Forgotten Classic of European Sociology". Journal of Classical Sociology. 6 (3): 390. doi:10.1177/1468795X06069685.
- Rostafinski, Joseph (2013). "Erazm Majewski i jego Słownik nazwisk zoologicznych i botanicznych polskich". Prace Filologizne. LXIV: 373 – via Academia.edu.
- Bukowska, S. (2017). "Civilization issues of deliberations on a man in the conception of Erazm Majewski". Folia Philosophica. 38.
- Szumera, G. (1993). "Historiozofia Oswalda Spenglera a koncepcja filozoficzna Erazma Majewskiego" (PDF). Folia Philosophica: 89–101.
