= List of Polish-language authors =

Chronological list of authors who wrote in the Polish language

This is a list of Polish-language authors, including novelists, poets, playwrights, philosophers, historians, essayists, and other writers associated with Polish literature. The list includes authors from the Renaissance to the present day whose works were written primarily in Polish, including writers active both within and outside Poland.

Polish-language literature has produced internationally influential authors across multiple literary periods and movements, including Polish Romanticism, Young Poland, interwar literature, postwar literature, and contemporary fiction and poetry. Several Polish-language authors, including Henryk Sienkiewicz, Czesław Miłosz, Wisława Szymborska, and Olga Tokarczuk, received the Nobel Prize in Literature.

Authors are listed chronologically by year of birth:

- (ca. 1370–1435) Paweł Włodkowic
- (1437–1496) Filip Callimachus
- (1457–1523) Maciej Miechowita
- (ca. 1465 – after 1529) Biernat of Lublin
- (ca. 1480 – after 1533) Mikołaj Hussowski
- (1482–1537) Andrzej Krzycki
- (1503–1572) Andrzej Frycz Modrzewski
- (1505–1569) Mikołaj Rej
- (ca. 1525–1573) Piotr of Goniądz
- (1530–1584) Jan Kochanowski
- (1536–1612) Piotr Skarga
- (1539–1603) Jan Dymitr Solikowski
- (1547 – ca. 1593) Maciej Stryjkowski
- (1566–1636) Fabian Birkowski
- (1573–1640) Daniel Naborowski
- (1580–1653) Szymon Okolski
- (ca. 1585 – ca. 1647) Wojciech Dębołęcki
- (1588–1656) Szymon Starowolski
- (1595–1640) Maciej Kazimierz Sarbiewski
- (ca. 1600–1661) Samuel Twardowski
- (1609–1655) Krzysztof Opaliński
- (1621–1693) Jan Andrzej Morsztyn
- (1621–1696) Wacław Potocki
- (1623–1675) Stanisław Lubieniecki
- (1633–1700) Wespazjan Kochowski
- (ca. 1636–1701) Jan Chryzostom Pasek
- (1651–1701) Anna Stanisławska
- (1690–1756) Stefan Garczyński
- (1694–1774) Przybysław Dyjamentowski
- (1702–1774) Józef Andrzej Załuski
- (1720–1784) Franciszek Bohomolec
- (1722–1805) Jacek Jezierski
- (1725–1811) Ignacy Nagurczewski
- (1733–1798) Adam Naruszewicz
- (1734–1823) Adam Kazimierz Czartoryski
- (1735–1801) Ignacy Krasicki
- (1738–1794) Józef Kossakowski (bishop)
- (1739–1812) Stanisław Trembecki
- (1746–1817) Michał Dymitr Krajewski
- (1746–1835) Izabela Czartoryska
- (1748–1826) Józef Maksymilian Ossoliński
- (1750–1807) Franciszek Kniaźnin
- (1750–1809) Roman Ignacy Potocki
- (1750–1812) Hugo Kołłątaj
- (1755–1821) Stanisław Kostka Potocki
- (1755–1826) Stanisław Staszic
- (1757–1829) Wojciech Bogusławski
- (1757–1841) Julian Ursyn Niemcewicz
- (1761–1815) Jan Potocki
- (1762–1808) Franciszek Ksawery Dmochowski
- (1764–1855) Christoph Mrongovius
- (1765–1809) Cyprian Godebski
- (1768–1838) Jędrzej Śniadecki
- (1768–1854) Maria Wirtemberska
- (1770–1861) Adam Jerzy Czartoryski
- (1771–1820) Alojzy Feliński
- (1784–1864) Teodor Narbutt
- (1786–1861) Joachim Lelewel
- (1787–1861) Antoni Gorecki
- (1791–1835) Kazimierz Brodziński
- (1791–1851) Isaac Erter
- (1793–1876) Aleksander Fredro
- (1798–1845) Klementyna Hoffmanowa
- (1798–1855) Adam Mickiewicz
- (1800–1858) Osip Senkovsky
- (1801–1869) Franciszek Ksawery Godebski
- (1801–1876) Seweryn Goszczyński
- (1803–1834) Maurycy Mochnacki
- (1804–1886) Michał Czajkowski
- (1807–1875) Karol Libelt
- (1807–1877) Lucjan Siemieński
- (1809–1849) Juliusz Słowacki
- (1812–1859) Zygmunt Krasiński
- (1812–1887) Józef Ignacy Kraszewski
- (1814–1878) Ludwik Mierosławski
- (1814–1894) August Cieszkowski
- (1817–1879) Ryszard Wincenty Berwiński
- (1818–1876) Narcyza Żmichowska
- (1819–1890) Agnieszka Baranowska
- (1821–1883) Cyprian Norwid
- (1822–1899) Edmund Chojecki
- (1823–1862) Władysław Syrokomla
- (1823–1897) Kornel Ujejski
- (1826–1891) Ignacy Żagiell
- (1827–1896) Kajetan Kraszewski
- (1829–1901) Lucyna Ćwierczakiewiczowa
- (1833–1863) Mieczysław Romanowski
- (1837–1901) Michał Bałucki
- (1837–1917) Stanisław Tarnowski
- (1838–1886) Jan Lam
- (1838–1897) Adam Asnyk
- (1839–1902) Adolf Dygasiński
- (1839–1909) Adam Bełcikowski
- (1841–1910) Eliza Orzeszkowa
- (1842–1932) Jan Słomka
- (1843–1913) Władysław Łoziński
- (1846–1916) Henryk Sienkiewicz
- (1847–1912) Bolesław Prus
- (1849–1935) Michał Bobrzyński
- (1850–1917) Julian Ochorowicz
- (1851–1915) Stanisław Witkiewicz
- (1852–1915) Isaac Leib Peretz
- (1852–1927) Kazimierz Bartoszewicz
- (1858–1924) Ludwik Stasiak
- (1858–1945) Wacław Sieroszewski
- (1859–1936) Nahum Sokolow
- (1860–1921) Gabriela Zapolska
- (1860–1926) Jan Kasprowicz
- (1861–1929) Antoni Lange
- (1861–1929) Józef Kallenbach
- (1862–1917) Téodor de Wyzewa
- (1862–1949) Feliks Koneczny
- (1864–1925) Stefan Żeromski
- (1864–1935) Franciszek Nowicki
- (1865–1940) Kazimierz Przerwa-Tetmajer
- (1867–1925) Władysław Reymont
- (1868–1927) Stanisław Przybyszewski
- (1868–1940) Ludwik Marian Kurnatowski
- (1869–1907) Stanisław Wyspiański
- (1870–1918) Lucjan Rydel
- (1870–1932) Malwina Garfeinowa-Garska
- (1871–1937) Andrzej Strug
- (1873–1921) Tadeusz Rittner
- (1873–1940) Wacław Berent
- (1873–1944) Karol Irzykowski
- (1874–1915) Jerzy Żuławski
- (1874–1941) Tadeusz Boy-Żeleński
- (1875–1930) Władysław Orkan
- (1876–1918) Jan August Kisielewski
- (1876–1945) Ferdynand Antoni Ossendowski
- (1877 or 1879 – 1937) Bolesław Leśmian
- (1877–1930) Włodzimierz Perzyński
- (1878–1911) Stanisław Brzozowski
- (1878–1957) Leopold Staff
- (1878 or 1879 – 1942) Janusz Korczak
- (1880–1945) Michał Józef Römer
- (1880–1970) Anzia Yezierska
- (1881–1944) Anna Zahorska
- (1881–1946) Paweł Hulka-Laskowski
- (1882–1927) Włodzimierz Zagórski (writer)
- (1882–1942) Zygmunt Kisielewski
- (1884–1944) Leon Chwistek
- (1884–1953) Kornel Makuszyński
- (1885–1939) Stanisław Ignacy Witkiewicz (Witkacy)
- (1885–1954) Zofia Nałkowska
- (1886–1980) Władysław Tatarkiewicz
- (1886–1981) Tadeusz Kotarbiński
- (1887–1936) Stefan Grabiński
- (1887–1951) Henryk Leon Strasburger
- (1888–1964) Alfred Niezychowski
- (1889–1931) Tadeusz Hołówko
- (1889–1961) Stefania Zahorska
- (1889–1965) Maria Dąbrowska
- (1889–1968) Zofia Kossak-Szczucka
- (1890–1963) Kazimierz Ajdukiewicz
- (1891–1945) Maria Pawlikowska-Jasnorzewska
- (1891–1963) Gustaw Morcinek
- (1892–1942) Bruno Schulz
- (1893–1970) Roman Ingarden
- (1894–1942) Józef Stefan Godlewski
- (1894–1953) Julian Tuwim
- (1894–1958) Władysław Kowalski
- (1894–1969) Kazimierz Wierzyński
- (1894–1972) Magdalena Samozwaniec
- (1894–1973) Wacław Stachiewicz
- (1894–1978) Zygmunt Szweykowski
- (1894–1980) Jarosław Iwaszkiewicz
- (1894–1985) Arkady Fiedler
- (1895–1959) Stanisław Młodożeniec
- (1895–1976) Antoni Słonimski
- (1895–1978) Jan Parandowski
- (1897–1937) Kazimierz Nowak
- (1897–1962) Władysław Broniewski
- (1898–1939) Tadeusz Dołęga-Mostowicz
- (1898–1966) Jan Brzechwa
- (1899–1956) Jan Lechoń
- (1900–1961) Andrzej Stawar
- (1900–1967) Aleksander Wat
- (1901–1938) Bruno Jasieński
- (1901–1964) Sergiusz Piasecki
- (1902–1969) Jerzy Zawieyski
- (1902–1970) Tadeusz Manteuffel
- (1902–1985) Józef Mackiewicz
- (1902–1995) Józef Maria Bocheński
- (1903–1978) Aleksander Kamiński
- (1903–1980) Jan Fethke
- (1904–1969) Witold Gombrowicz
- (1904–1981) Janina Broniewska
- (1905–1953) Konstanty Ildefons Gałczyński
- (1905–1964) Wanda Wasilewska
- (1905–1982) Adam Ważyk
- (1905–1984) Isacque Graeber
- (1905–1986) Karol Olgierd Borchardt
- (1905–1996) Julian Stryjkowski
- (1906–1965) Stanisław Jaśkowski
- (1906–1986) Wiesław Wernic
- (1906–2000) Jerzy Giedroyc
- (1907–1991) Stanisław Wygodzki
- (1908–1979) Sydor Rey
- (1908–1980) Aleksander Baumgardten
- (1908–1988) Teodor Parnicki
- (1909–1942) Henryka Łazowertówna
- (1909–1966) Stanisław Jerzy Lec
- (1909–1970) Paweł Jasienica
- (1909–1983) Jerzy Andrzejewski
- (1909–1988) Józef Łobodowski
- (1910–1978) Maria Boniecka
- (1910–1988) Janusz Pasierb
- (1910–1991) Jan Dobraczyński
- (1910–1994) Edmund Niziurski
- (1910–2007) Stanisław Dobosiewicz
- (1911–1975) Eugeniusz Żytomirski
- (1911–1991) Stefan Kisielewski
- (1911–2000) Władysław Szpilman
- (1911–2004) Czesław Miłosz
- (1912–1990) Adolf Rudnicki
- (1912–1998) Marian Brandys
- (1913–1979) Zygmunt Witymir Bieńkowski
- (1913–1995) Mirosław Żuławski
- (1913–2005) Józef Garliński
- (1914–1973) Bohdan Arct
- (1914–1983) Stefan Lichański
- (1914–2001) Jan Kott
- (1915–2004) Jeremi Przybora
- (1915–2006) Jan Twardowski
- (1916–1957) Wawrzyniec Żuławski
- (1916–1991) Wilhelm Szewczyk
- (1916–2000) Wojciech Żukrowski
- (1917–1944) Zuzanna Ginczanka
- (1918–1963) Stanisław Grzesiuk
- (1919–1976) Henryk Jasiczek
- (1919–2000) Gustaw Herling-Grudziński
- (1919–2011) Marian Pankowski
- (1920–1985) Leopold Tyrmand
- (1920–2003) Sat Okh
- (1920–2005) Karol Wojtyła (Pope John Paul II)
- (1920–2006) Lesław Bartelski
- (1920–2006) Lucjan Wolanowski
- (1921–1944) Krzysztof Kamil Baczyński
- (1921–2006) Stanisław Lem
- (1921–2014) Tadeusz Różewicz
- (1922–1951) Tadeusz Borowski
- (1922–1994) Tadeusz Żychiewicz
- (1922–1998) Maciej Słomczyński
- (1923–2001) Maksymilian Berezowski
- (1923–2003) Władysław Kozaczuk
- (1923–2011) Chava Rosenfarb
- (1923–2012) Wisława Szymborska
- (1924–1998) Zbigniew Herbert
- (1924–2010) Helena Pasierbska
- (1924–2022) Gerda Weissmann Klein
- (1925–2024) Bat-Sheva Dagan
- (1926–2015) Tadeusz Konwicki
- (1926–2024) Ruth Minsky Sender
- (1927–2009) Leszek Kołakowski
- (1928–2007) Jerzy Janicki
- (1928–2015) Roman Frister
- (1928–2016) Robert Stiller
- (1929–1994) Zbigniew Nienacki
- (1929–2004) Zygmunt Kubiak
- (1930–1994) Bogdan-Dawid Wojdowski
- (1930–2013) Sławomir Mrożek
- (1930–2020) Wojciech Zabłocki
- (1930–2021) Zdzisław Najder
- (1931–2015) Ryszard Kornacki
- (1932–1957) Andrzej Bursa
- (1932–2007) Ryszard Kapuściński
- (1932–2013) Joanna Chmielewska
- (1932–2015) Michael Alfred Peszke
- (1932–2026) Wiesław Myśliwski
- (1933–1991) Jerzy Kosiński
- (born 1933) Joanna Olczak-Ronikier
- (born 1933) Miriam Winter
- (1934–1969) Marek Hłasko
- (1934–1976) Stanisław Grochowiak
- (1934–2000) Leszek Podhorodecki
- (1935–1967) Halina Poświatowska
- (1935–1984) Janusz Gaudyn
- (1935–2019) Stanisław Moskal
- (born 1936) Henryk Grynberg
- (1936–1997) Agnieszka Osiecka
- (1936–2006) Wilhelm Przeczek
- (1936–2007) Piotr Kuncewicz
- (born 1937) Hanna Krall
- (1937–1979) Edward Stachura
- (1937–2019) Karol Modzelewski
- (1937–2024) Stanisław Tym
- (1938–1985) Janusz A. Zajdel
- (1938–2017) Janusz Głowacki
- (1940–2024) Edward Redliński
- (1941–1989) Mirosław Dzielski
- (born 1941) Leszek Długosz
- (1942–2022) Lech Wyszczelski
- (1943–1986) Wacław Kisielewski
- (1943–2020) Wojciech Karpiński
- (1943–2023) Bohdan Urbankowski
- (born 1944) Michał Heller
- (born 1944) Waldemar Łysiak
- (1944–2015) Edmund Wnuk-Lipiński
- (born 1945) Krzysztof Piesiewicz
- (born 1945) Małgorzata Musierowicz
- (1946–2015) Piotr Domaradzki
- (born 1946) Ewa Kuryluk
- (born 1948) Andrzej Sapkowski
- (born 1949) Aleksandra Ziółkowska-Boehm
- (born 1949) Antoni Libera
- (born 1949) Joanna Siedlecka
- (born 1949) Stefan Chwin
- (born 1950) Stanisław Bereś
- (1950–2026) Anastazja Pustelnik
- (1951–2015) Jerzy Samp
- (born 1952) Eva Stachniak
- (1952–2020) Jerzy Pilch
- (born 1954) Marek Huberath
- (born 1955) Magdalena Tulli
- (1955–2022) Leszek Engelking
- (1957–2009) Grażyna Miller
- (born 1957) Agata Tuszyńska
- (born 1957) Grażyna Wojcieszko
- (born 1957) Paweł Huelle
- (1958–2005) Tomasz Pacyński
- (born 1960) Andrzej Stasiuk
- (born 1960) Andrzej Ziemiański
- (born 1961) Marcin Świetlicki
- (born 1961) Agnieszka Taborska
- (born 1962) Marek Jan Chodakiewicz
- (born 1962) Olga Tokarczuk
- (born 1964) Jacek Podsiadło
- (born 1964) Rafał A. Ziemkiewicz
- (born 1965) Jarosław Grzędowicz
- (born 1966) Andrzej Majewski
- (born 1966) Marek Krajewski
- (born 1966) Mariusz Szczygieł
- (born 1967) Ewa Białołęcka
- (born 1967) Andrzej Zaucha
- (born 1968) Joanna Bator
- (born 1971) Anna Brzezińska
- (born 1971) Aleksandra Gajewska
- (born 1972) Wojciech Kuczok
- (born 1974) Andrzej Pilipiuk
- (born 1974) Jacek Dukaj
- (born 1974) Sabina Jakubowska
- (born 1975) Michał Witkowski
- (born 1976) Anna Kańtoch
- (born 1976) Zygmunt Miłoszewski
- (born 1977) Łukasz Orbitowski
- (born 1978) Żanna Słoniowska
- (born 1978) Agnieszka Stelmaszyk
- (born 1979) Sylwia Chutnik
- (born 1980) Jacek Dehnel
- (born 1980) Abelard Giza
- (born 1982) Jakub Ćwiek
- (born 1983) Dorota Masłowska
- (born 1984) Joanna Lech
- (born 1985) Xawery Stańczyk
- (born 1989) Weronika Murek
- (born 2005) Nela The Little Reporter

== See also ==
- List of Polish women writers
- List of Polish novelists
- Polish literature
- List of authors
- Polish language
- List of Poles
- History of philosophy in Poland
