= List of Polish women writers =

This is a list of women writers who were born in Poland or whose writings are closely associated with that country.

== A ==
- Miriam Akavia (1927–2015), Polish-born Israeli novelist, translator
- Lisa Appignanesi (born 1946), Polish-born English-language novelist, non-fiction writer, editor, columnist
- Franciszka Arnsztajnowa (1865–1942), poet, playwright, journalist

== B ==
- Rosa Bailly (1890–1976), teacher, activist, translator, journalist history and travel writer and poet
- Lidia Bajkowska, writer of children’s educational music books
- Jadwiga Barańska (1935–2024), actress, screenwriter
- Ewa Białołęcka (born 1967), novelist, short story writer
- Agnieszka Biedrzycka, contemporary historian, researcher and editor of the Polish Biographical Dictionary
- Irena Bobowska (1920–1942), journalist, editor, poet, resistance worker
- Krystyna Boglar (1931–2019), writer and screenwriter known mostly for her work for children and young adults
- Helena Boguszewska (1883–1978), writer, columnist and social activist
- Barbara Bojarska, contemporary historian, works on the history of Pomerania
- Maria Boniecka (1910–1978), editor, writer, teacher, resistance fighter
- Anna Brzezińska, (born 1971), historian, fantasy author

== C ==
- Zofia Chądzyńska (1912–2003), novelist, translator
- Joanna Chmielewska (1932–2013), widely translated bestselling crime fiction novelist, short story writer, non-fiction writer, screenwriter
- Sylwia Chutnik (born 1979), novelist
- Izabela Czartoryska (1746–1835), salonist, diarist, memoirist

== D ==
- Maria Dąbrowska (1889–1965), novelist, essayist, journalist, playwright
- Janina Domanska (1913–1995), Polish-American children's writer, writing in English
- Gusta Dawidson Draenger (1917–1943), diarist
- Kinga Dunin (born 1954), novelist, non-fiction writer, feminist
- Elżbieta Drużbacka (c.1695–1765), poet
- Wanda Dynowska (1888–1971), theosophist, non-fiction writer, publisher in India, translator of Polish poetry into English

== F ==
- Ida Fink (1921–2011), Polish-Israeli writer, Polish-language works on the Holocaust
- Wirydianna Fiszerowa (1761–1826), noblewoman, French-language memoirist

== G ==
- Aleksandra Gajewska, children's writer, poet
- Zuzanna Ginczanka (1917–1945), poet, translator
- Agnieszka Graff (born 1970), non-fiction writer, essayist, columnist, feminist
- Manuela Gretkowska (born 1964), novelist, short story writer, screenwriter, politician
- Katarzyna Grochola (born 1957), best selling novelist, short story writer, playwright
- Wioletta Grzegorzewska (born 1974), poet, some works translated into English

== H ==
- Klementyna Hoffmanowa (1798–1845), children's author, translator

== I ==
- Maria Ilnicka (c.1825–1897), poet, novelist, translator, journalist
- Bozenna Intrator (born 1964), Polish-American novelist, poet, playwright, translator, writing in German, Polish and English

== J ==
- Irena Jurgielewiczowa (1903–2003), children's writer, memoirist

== K ==
- Anna Kamieńska (1920–1986), children's writer, poet, translator
- Anna Kańtoch (born 1976), fantasy writer
- Gerda Weissmann Klein (1924–2022), Polish-American writer, works on the Holocaust
- Irena Klepfisz (born 1941), poet, essayist, feminist writer, translator, writing in Yiddish and English
- Maria Konopnicka (1842–1910), acclaimed poet, novelist, children's writer
- Rachel Korn (1898–1982), poet, writing in Polish and (mainly) Yiddish
- Natalia Korwin-Szymanowska (1857–1952), writer, journalist, and translator
- Zofia Kossak-Szczucka (1889–1968), historical novelist, memoirist, columnist
- Chana Kowalska (1899–1942), Jewish painter and journalist
- Faustina Kowalska (1905–1938), nun, author of a diary relating her mystic experiences
- Hanna Krall (born 1935), journalist, historian, works on the war period in Poland
- Katarzyna Krenz (born 1953), poet, novelist, translator
- Maria Kuncewiczowa (1895–1989), novelist, columnist

== L ==
- Anna Langfus (1920–1966), Polish-born French-language novelist
- Marija Lastauskienė (1872–1957), novelist, short story writer, often in collaboration with her sister Sofija Pšibiliauskienė, wrote in Polish and Lithuanian
- Henryka Łazowertówna (1909–1942), poet, remembered for her poem written in the Warsaw Ghetto
- Joanna Lech (born 1984), poet, some works translated into English
- Ewa Lipska (born 1945), widely translated poet
- Tekla Teresa Łubieńska (1767–1810), poet, playwright and translator from the French and English
- Jadwiga Łuszczewska (1834–1908), poet, novelist

== M ==
- Wanda Malecka (1800–1860), editor, translator, poet, novelist, newspaper publisher, journalist
- Dorota Masłowska (born 1983), best selling novelist, playwright
- Grażyna Miller (1957–2009), poet, critic, translator
- Weronika Murek (born 1989) short story writer, playwright
- Małgorzata Musierowicz (born 1945), popular children's writer

== N ==
- Anna Nakwaska (1781–1851), memoirist, novelist, children's author and women's educationalist
- Zofia Nałkowska (1884–1954), acclaimed novelist, playwright

== O ==
- Eliza Orzeszkowa (1841–1910), acclaimed novelist, playwright, short story writer
- Hanna Ożogowska (1904–1995), novelist, poet, translator

== P ==
- Helena Janina Pajzderska (1862–1927), novelist, poet, translator
- Magdalena Parys (born 1971), novelist
- Maria Pawlikowska-Jasnorzewska (1891–1945), acclaimed poet, playwright
- Tillie S. Pine (1896–1999), Polish-American children's writer
- Zofia Posmysz (1923–2022), journalist, novelist, and author
- Halina Poświatowska (1935–1967), significant poet, essayist, autobiographer
- Stanisława Przybyszewska (1901–1935), playwright, writer of acclaimed works on the French revolution
- Sofija Pšibiliauskienė (1867–1926), sister of Marija Lastauskienė, co-authored some of her works
- Anastazja Pustelnik (1950–2026), cookbook writer (Polish and other recipes)

== R ==
- Małgorzata Rejmer (born 1985) novelist, short story writer
- Maria Rodziewiczówna (1863–1944), important novelist and short story writer of the interwar period
- Helena Romer-Ochenkowska (1875–1947), writer, playwright, opinion journalist, columnist and theatre critic
- Chava Rosenfarb (1923–2011), Polish born Yiddish poet, short story writer

== S ==
- Barbara Sanguszko (1718–1791), poet, translator, moralist and philanthropist
- Magdalena Samozwaniec (1894–1972), satirist
- Wanda Sieradzka de Ruig (1923–2008), poet, journalist, television screenwriter
- Kate Simon (1912–1990), Polish-born American travel writer, autobiographer
- Żanna Słoniowska (born 1978), novelist
- Dominika Słowik (born 1988) writer
- Eva Stachniak (born 1952), Polish-born Canadian novelist, short story writer
- Agnieszka Stelmaszyk (born 1978), writer, novelist
- Anna Świrszczyńska (1909–1984), poet, some works translated into English
- Anna Szatkowska (1928–2015), memoirist, wartime experiences written in French
- Lola Szereszewska (1895–1943), Polish-Jewish poet journalist
- Małgorzata Szumowska (born 1973), screenwriter, film director
- Wisława Szymborska (1923–2012), poet, essayist, translation, Nobel Prize in Literature

== T ==
- Olga Tokarczuk (born 1962), poet, popular novelist, short story writer, essayist, Nobel Prize in Literature
- Dorota Terakowska (1938–2004) novelist and journalist best known for literature for children and young adults
- Magdalena Tulli (born 1955), novelist, translator

== W ==
- Bronisława Wajs (1908–1987), Polish-Romani poet, singer
- Joanna Wajs (born 1979), poet, critic, translator
- Maria Wirtemberska (1768–1854), salonist, novelist
- Maia Wojciechowska (1927–2002), Polish-American children's writer

== Z ==
- Julia Zabłocka (1931–1993), historian, archaeologist
- Anna Zahorska (1882–1942), poet, novelist, playwright
- Stefania Zahorska (1890–1961), novelist, historian, non-fiction writer, memoirist
- Maria Julia Zaleska (1831–1889), novelist, short story writer, essayist
- Gabriela Zapolska (1857–1921), prolific novelist, playwright, short story writer, critic, actress
- Katarzyna Ewa Zdanowicz-Cyganiak (born 1979), acclaimed contemporary poet, regional journalist and social scientist
- Narcyza Żmichowska (1819–1876), pen name Gabryella, novelist, poet, letter writer, feminist
- Rajzel Żychlińsky (1910–2001), Yiddish-language poet

== See also ==
- List of Polish-language authors
- List of women writers
