= List of Polish novelists =

This is a list of novelists from Poland.

== A ==
- Sholem Asch (1880–1957), author of Kiddush ha-Shem (1919)

== B ==
- Jurek Becker (1937–1997), author of Jacob the Liar (1969)

== C ==
- Joseph Conrad (1857–1924), author of several novels including Heart of Darkness and Lord Jim (1900)

== D ==
- Franciszek Ksawery Dmochowski (1762–1818)
- Tadeusz Dołęga-Mostowicz (1898–1939), author of a dozen popular novels including Ostatnia brygada (The Last Brigade) and Kariera Nikodema Dyzmy (The Career of Nicodemus Dyzma)
- Stanisław Dygat (1914–1978), author of Pożegnania (1948), Podróż (1958), Disneyland (1965), and Dworzec w Monachium (1973)

== G ==
- Cyprian Godebski (1765–1809)
- Witold Gombrowicz (1904–1969), author of Ferdydurke (1937), Trans-Atlantyk (1953), Pornografia (1960), and Cosmos (1967)
- Henryk Grynberg (born 1936)

== I ==
- Maria Ilnicka (1825–1897)

== K ==
- Juliusz Kaden-Bandrowski (1885–1944)
- Maria Konopnicka (1842–1910)
- Jerzy Kosiński (1933–1991)
- Daniel Koziarski (born 1979)
- Ignacy Krasicki (1735–1810)
- Józef Ignacy Kraszewski (1812–1887)
- Maria Kuncewiczowa (1895–1989)

== Ł ==
- Jadwiga Łuszczewska (1834–1908)

== M ==
- Józef Mackiewicz (1902–1985)
- Małgorzata Musierowicz (born 1945)
- Wiesław Myśliwski (1932–2026)

== O ==
- Eliza Orzeszkowa (1842–1910)
- Ferdynand Antoni Ossendowski (1876–1945)
- Hanna Ożogowska (1904–1995)

== P ==
- Bolesław Prus (1847–1912), author of The Outpost (Placówka, 1886), The Doll (Lalka, 1889), The New Woman (Emancypantki, 1893), and Pharaoh (Faraon, 1895)
- Stanisław Przybyszewski (1868–1927)

== R ==
- Władysław Reymont (1868–1925)
- Maria Rodziewiczówna (1863–1944)
- Adolf Rudnicki (1912–1990)

== S ==
- Henryk Sienkiewicz (1846–1916)
- Wacław Sieroszewski (1858–1945)
- Żanna Słoniowska (born 1978)
- Udo Steinke (1942–1999)
- Agnieszka Stelmaszyk (born 1978)

== T ==
- Olga Tokarczuk (born 1962)
- Szczepan Twardoch (born 1979)

== Z ==
- Jan Chryzostom Zachariasiewicz (1823–1906), author of Skromne nadzieje (1854), Na kresach (1860), Święty Jur, vol. 1–3 (1862), Człowiek bez jutra (1871) Zły interes (1876), Wybór pism, a collection of works, vol. 1–11 (1886–1888)
- Adam Zagajewski (1945–2021)
- Włodzimierz Zagórski (writer) (1834–1902) author of Pamiętnik starego parasola (1884) and Wilcze plemię (1885)
- Anna Zahorska (1878 or 1882–1942) author of Utopia, Trucizny (1928)
- Stefania Zahorska (1890–1961), author of Stacja Abbesses (1952)
- Maria Julia Zaleska (1831–1889), author of Niezgodni królewicze (1889)
- Kazimierz Zalewski (1849–1919), author of Syn przemytnika (1884)
- Witold Zalewski (1921–2009), author of Ostatni postój (novel about January Uprising, 1979) and Zakładnicy (2001)
- Gabriela Zapolska (1857–1921), author of 23 novels
- Kazimierz Zdziechowski (1878–1942), author of Fuimus (1900)
- Emil Zegadłowicz (1888–1941)

== Ż ==
- Stefan Żeromski (1864–1925), author of Ashes (Popioły, 1902–03) and The Faithful River (Wierna rzeka, 1912)
- Jerzy Żuławski (1874–1915)
- Mirosław Żuławski (1913–1995)
- Eugeniusz Żytomirski (1911–1975)

== See also ==
- List of Poles
