= Udo (given name) =

Male given name

Udo is a masculine given name. It may refer to:

== Medieval era ==
- Udo of Neustria, 9th-century nobleman
- Udo (Obotrite prince) (died 1028)
- Udo (archbishop of Trier) (c. 1030 – 1078)
- Lothair Udo II, Margrave of the Nordmark (c. 1025 – 1082)

== Modern era ==
- Udo Anneken (1917–1997), German Wehrmacht officer in World War II, recipient of the Knight's Cross of the Iron Cross
- Udo Bullmann (born 1956), German politician
- Udo Cordes (1921–2007), German Luftwaffe officer in World War II, recipient of the Knight's Cross of the Iron Cross
- Udo Di Fabio (born 1954), German jurist
- Udo Dziersk (born 1961), German painter
- Udo Gurgel (born 1938), German engineer and designer
- Max Udo Hollrung (1858–1937), German botanist
- Udo Z. Karzi (born 1970), Indonesian writer
- Udo Kasemets (1919–2014), Estonian-Canadian composer
- Udo Keppler (1872–1956), American cartoonist
- Udo Kier (1944–2025), German actor
- Udo Margedant (1942–2026), German political scientist
- Udo Pastörs (born 1952), German far-right politician
- Udo Proksch (1934–2001), Austrian businessman, industrialist and murderer
- Udo Samel (born 1953), German actor
- Udo Schaefer (1926–2019), German lawyer and Bahá'í author
- Udo Schnelle (born 1952), German theologian and professor
- Udo Sellbach (1927–2006), German-Australian visual artist and educator
- Udo Spreitzenbarth, German photographer
- Udo Stein (born 1983), German politician
- Udo Steinke (1942–1999), German writer
- Udo Uibo (born 1956), Estonian literary critic, editor, translator and lexicographer
- Udo Voigt (1952–2025), German politician
- Udo Walendy (1927–2022), German author, historian, former soldier and Holocaust denier
- Udo Weilacher (born 1963), German landscape architect, author and professor
- Udo von Woyrsch (1895–1983), high-ranking Nazi SS officer responsible for numerous murders during the Holocaust
- Udo Zander (born 1959), Swedish organizational theorist and former professor of business administration

=== Music ===
- Udo Dahmen (born 1951), German drummer and author
- Udo Dirkschneider (born 1952), German heavy metal vocalist who formed the band U.D.O.
- Udo Jürgens (1934–2014), Austrian composer and singer
- Udo Lindenberg (born 1946), German rock musician and composer
- Udo Mechels (born 1976), Belgian musician often known simply as "Udo"
- Udo Suzuki (born 1970), Japanese musician and comedian
- Udo Zimmermann (1943–2021), German composer, music director and conductor

=== Sports ===
- Udo Beyer (born 1955), East German shot putter
- Udo Bölts (born 1966), German racing cyclist
- Udo Fortune (born 1988), Nigerian soccer player
- Udo Gelhausen (born 1956), West German shot putter
- Udo Hempel (born 1946), German road and track cyclist
- Udo Horsmann (born 1952), German footballer
- Udo Kiessling (born 1955), first ice hockey player to compete in five Olympic Games (1976–1992)
- Udo Lattek (1935–2015), German football player and coach and TV pundit
- Udo Lehmann (born 1973), German bobsledder
- Udo Müller, East German slalom canoeist who competed in the 1970s
- Udochukwu "Udo" Nwoko (born 1984), Maltese-Nigerian footballer
- Udo Onwere (born 1971), English footballer
- Udo Poser (born 1947), East German swimmer
- Udo Quellmalz (born 1967), German judoka
- Udo Raumann (born 1969), German slalom canoer
- Udo Riglewski (born 1966), German tennis player
- Udo Schütz (born 1937), German racing driver
- Udo Schwarz (born 1986), German international rugby union player
- Udo Segreff (born 1973), German ice sledge hockey player
- Udo Wagner (born 1963), German fencer
- Udo Werner (1955–2012), West German slalom canoeist

== Other ==
- Udo of Aachen, fictional 13th-century monk created as a 1999 April Fool's hoax
- Udo the Red Panda, mascot of the University of Mannheim athletics teams
