= Animator (festival) =

Polish film festival

Animator International Animated Film Festival
- Location: Poznań, Poland
- Founded: 2008 by Estrada Poznańska
- Awards: Golden Pegasus (Złoty Pegaz)
- Hosted by: Kino Muza
- Festival date: June (5 days)
- Website: http://www.animator-festival.com

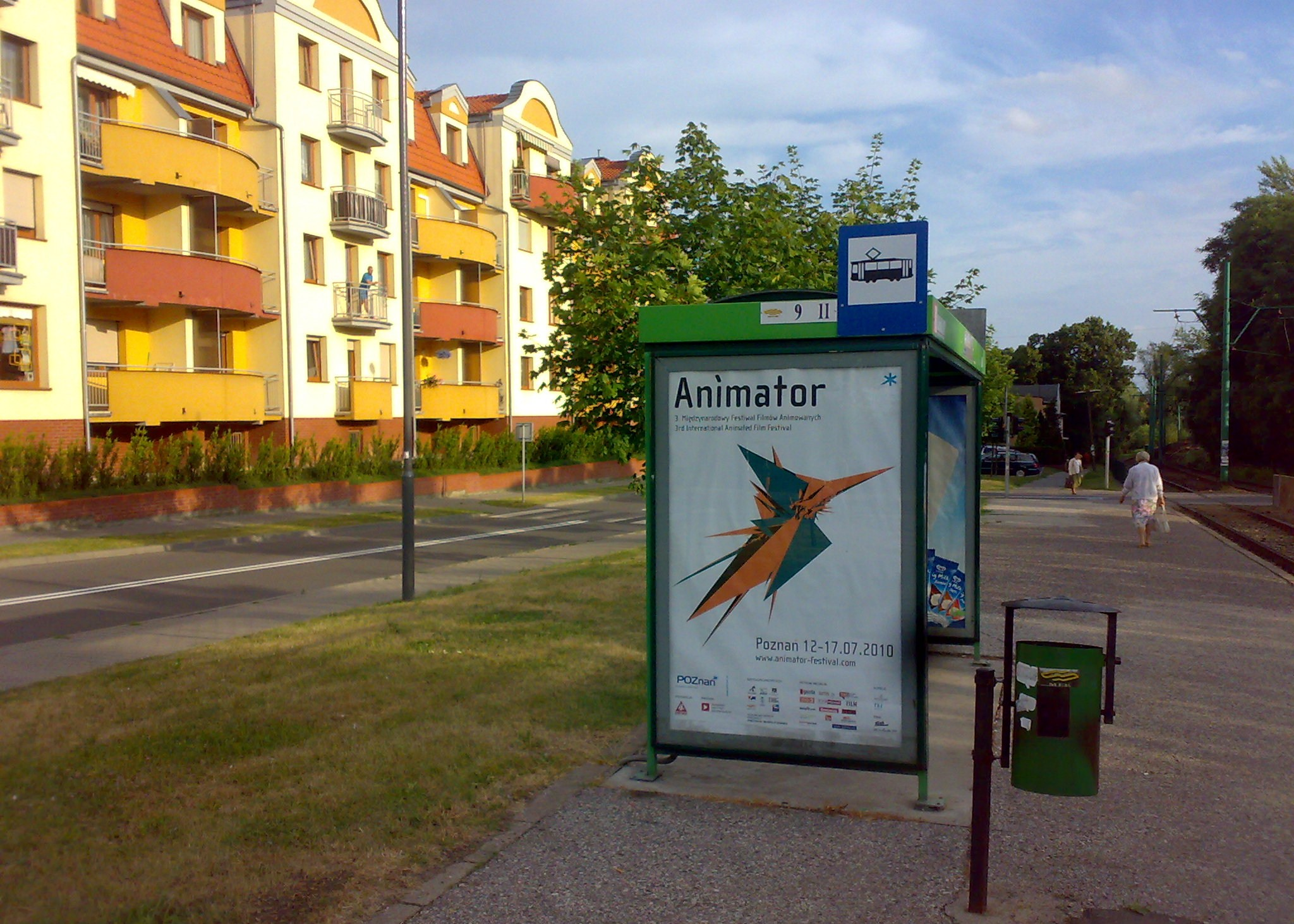
Animator 2010 advertisement in Ponznań

The ANIMATOR International Animated Film Festival (Polish: Międzynarodowy Festiwal Filmów Animowanych ANIMATOR), organized in Poznań under the patronage of the city of Poznań since 2008, is the most important international animated film festival in Poland. During every edition of this event more than 300 films from all over the world, including retrospectives, thematic reviews, premieres and screenings with live music and rarely shown works of animation pioneers are presented.

In 2017 Animator received the status of an Oscar® qualifying festival.

At the very heart of Animator lie the competitions, accompanying the Festival: the International Short Film Competitions, the International Feature Film Competition, the International Animated Series Competition, and the Polish Animated Film Competition.

Selected films are judged by an international jury. The grand prize awarded at this competition is the Golden Pegasus (Polish: "Złoty Pegaz").

The activities of the Animator Festival include meetings with artists, exhibitions, performances, concerts, workshops and lectures. A distinguishing feature of the Animator Festival is its focusing on the interrelations between animation and music. Many screenings are accompanied by live music, performed by a jazz trio, rock band, DJ collective or symphonic orchestra.

The programme of every edition of the festival is characterized by a broad thematic, cultural and historical diversity. Along with the most recent works representing various techniques and modern trends in animation cinema, the rich history and prehistory of the world cinema is presented at the festival.

Marcin Giżycki was the festival’s artistic director between 2008 and 2022. After his death, Adriana Prodeus was hired in his place, starting with the 2023 edition.

== Competition categories and prizes ==
Year	Prize	Film	Director	Country	Year of production
2008	Grand Prize (Golden Pegasus)	Madame Tutli-Putli	Chris Lavis and Maciek Szczerbowski	Canada	2007
2008	2nd Prize (Silver Pegasus)	Muto	Blu	Italy	2008
2008	3rd Prize (Bronze Pegasus)	Laska	Michał Socha	Poland	2008
2008	Special prizes				
2008	Special Jury Prize	Eletvonal (“The line of life”)	Tomek Ducki	Hungary	2007
2008	Ecological Film Prize	Veterinararsts (“The Veterinarian”)	Signe Baumane	Latvia	2007
2008	Festival Directors Prize	Exit	Grzegorz Koncewicz	Poland	2006
2008	ANIMATOR Festival Office Prize	Try Yangaly (“Three angels”)	Yulia Rudiskaya	Belarus	2007
2008	Honourable mentions				
2008	For screenplay	Štyri (“Four”)	Ivana Šebestová	Slovakia	2008
2008	For music and sound	Seemannstreue (“Sea Dog’s Devotion”)	Anna Kalus, music: Florian Kappler	Germany	2008
2008	For debut film	Dokumanimo	Małgorzata Bosek	Poland	2007
2008	For children film	Tôt ou tard	Jadwiga Kowalska	Switzerland	2007
2009	Grand Prize (Golden Pegasus)	Eintritt zum Paradies um 3 € 20 („Entrance to the Paradise 3 € 20”)	Edith Stauber	Austria	2008
2009	2nd Prize of the National Audiovisual Institute (Silver Pegasus)	Chainsaw	Dennis Tupicoff	Australia	2007
2009	3rd Prize (Bronze Pegasus)	Kaasasundinud kohustused (“Inalienable duty”)	Rao Heidmets	Estonia	2008
2009	Special prizes				
2009	Special prize for music film	Virus	Robert Proch	Poland	2009
2009	Special prize for children film	Gerald's Last Day	Justin & Shel Rasch	United States	2009
2009	Audience award	La maison en petits cubes	Kunio Kato	Japan	2008
2010	Grand Prize (Golden Pegasus)	Ukryte (“The Hidden”)	Piotr Szczepanowicz	Poland	2009
2010	2nd Prize of the National Audivisual Institute (Silver Pegasus)	Simon vagyok (“I am Simon”)	Tunde Molnar	Hungary	2009
2010	3rd Prize (Bronze Pegasus)	Big Bang Big Boom	Blu	Italy	2010
2010	Special prizes				
2010	Special prize for music film/ music	Love & Theft	Andreas Hykade	Germany	2010
2010	Special prize for children film	A trip to the seaside	Nina Bisyarina	Russia	2008
2010	Audience award	Big Bang Big Boom	Blu	Italy	2010
2010	Honourable mentions				
2010	Jury’s Special Honourable Mention	Millhaven	Bartek Kulas	Poland	2010
2010	Jury’s Special Honourable Mention for Children Film	Zhila-bila mucha (“Once upon a time there was a fly")	Alena Oyatieva	Russia	2009
2011	Grand Prize (Golden Pegasus)	Sinna mann (“An angry man“)	Anita Killi	Norway	2009
2011	2nd Prize of the National Audivisual Institute (Silver Pegasus)	Baka!!	Immanuel Wagner	Switzerland	2010
2011	3rd Prize (Bronze Pegasus)	Crossed Sild	Lea Vidaković, Ivana Bošnjak	Norway	2010
2011	Special prizes				
2011	Special prize for children film	Chroniques de la poisse	Osman Cerfon	France	2010
2011	Audience award	Sinna mann (“An angry man“)	Anita Killi	Norway	2009
2012	Grand Prize (Golden Pegasus)	Ya videl kak mishy kota horonili (“I saw the mice burying the cat“)	Dmitry Geller	Russia/China	2011
2012	2nd Prize of the National Audivisual Institute (Silver Pegasus)	Tussilago	Jonas Odell	Sweden	2010
2012	3rd Prize (Bronze Pegasus)	Le grand ailleurs et le petit ici	Michèle Lemieux	Canada	2011
2012	Special prizes				
2012	Special prize for music film/ music	Sunny Afternoon	Thomas Renoldner	Austria	2012
2012	Prize of the Polish Filmmakers Association for Best Polish Short Film	Papierowe pudełko (“Paper box”)	Zbigniew Czapla	Poland	2011
2012	Special prize for Full-length film	Droga na drugą stronę (“Way to the Other Side”)	Anca Damian	Romania/Poland	2011
2012	Audience award	Rew Day	Svilen Dimitrov	Bulgaria	2012

== Editions of the festival ==
- 1st International Animated Film Festival: 07–12 July 2008
- 2nd International Animated Film Festival: 06–11 July 2009
- 3rd International Animated Film Festival: 12–17 July 2010
- 4th International Animated Film Festival: 15–21 July 2011
- 5th International Animated Film Festival: 13–19 July 2012
- 6th International Animated Film Festival: 13–19 July 2013
- 7th International Animated Film Festival: 11-17 July 2014
- 8th International Animated Film Festival: 10-16 July 2015
- 9th International Animated Film Festival: 8-14 July 2016
- 10th International Animated Film Festival: 7-13 July 2017
- 11th International Animated Film Festival: 6-12 July 2018
- 12th International Animated Film Festival: 5-11 July 2019
- 13th International Animated Film Festival: 3-9 October 2020 (Poznań | online
- 14th International Animated Film Festival: 9-15 July 2021 (Poznań | online)
- 15th International Animated Film Festival: 8-15 July 2022 (Poznań), 16-21 July 2022 (online)
- 16th International Animated Film Festival: 21-25 June 2023 (Poznań), 26-30 June 2023 (online)
- 17th International Animated Film Festival: 25-30 June 2024
