= Wajs =

Wajs is a surname of Polish origin. Notable people with the surname include:

- Bronisława Wajs (1908–1987), Polish-Romani classic poet and singer
- Jadwiga Wajs (1912–1990), Polish athlete
- Joanna Wajs (born 1979), Polish writer, literary critic and translator

== See also ==
- Ollech & Wajs, Swiss watch company
