= Pod prąd (disambiguation) =

Pod prąd ('Against the current') was a Polish weekly Marxist newspaper published between 1934 and 1936

Pod prąd may also refer to:

- Pod prąd, 1988 album by KSU (band)
- Pod prąd, 2007 album by Onar (rapper)
