= Marcin Giżycki =

Polish filmmaker and critic (1951–2022)

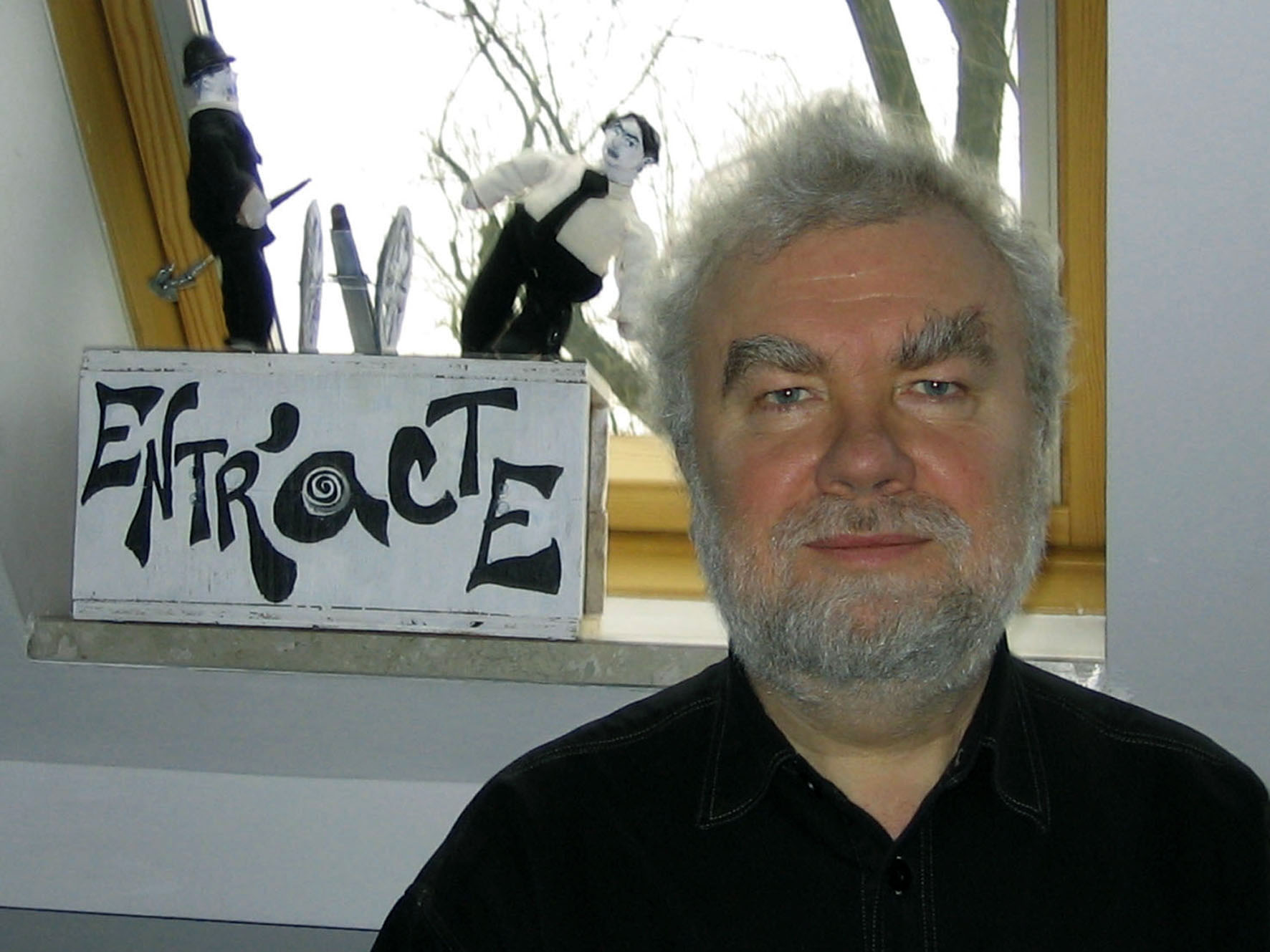
- Giżycki in 2007
- Born: 26 September 1951; Warsaw, Poland
- Died: 21 October 2022 (aged 71); Warsaw, Poland
- Occupations: Film historian; art historian; critic; film maker

Marcin Giżycki (26 September 1951 – 21 October 2022) was a Polish film and art historian, critic, and filmmaker. He was a professor at the Polish-Japanese Academy of Information Technology in Warsaw (since 2015), a Senior Lecturer at the Rhode Island School of Design (since 1988), and an Artistic Director of the ANIMATOR (festival) International Animated Film Festival Animator in Poznań, Poland (since 2007). He has authored eight books, co-edited two others, contributed photographs to four books by Agnieszka Taborska, and published around 400 articles on film and art in Polish and foreign publications. In 2016, he received the Award for the Outstanding Contribution to Animation Studies at Animafest, the World Festival of Animated Film in Zagreb, Croatia.

He died on 21 October 2022.

== Education and professional experience ==
Giżycki received his MA and Ph.D. in art history from the University of Warsaw in 1976 and 1995 respectively. He received his postdoctoral degree in film studies from the Jagiellonian University in Kraków, Poland, in 2006. He worked at the National Museum, Warsaw, in 1974–1975, was an editor-in-chief of the ASIFA quarterly Animafilm (1979–1981), was part of the editorial staff at Projekt in Warsaw (1979–1983) and an art critic for Literatura (1978–1981). In 1983 he taught at the Surrey Institute of Art & Design, University College in Farnham, England (formerly known as West Surrey College of Art and Design in Farnham). He was vice-president of the College of the Visual Arts and New Media in Warsaw, Poland (2002–2003). In 2012–2015 he was a professor at the Wyższa Szkoła Techniczna w Katowicach (Katowice School of Technology), Katowice, Poland.

== Associations ==
Polish Art Historians' Association, Polish Filmmakers' Association, International Association of Art Critics(AICA), International Film Critics Association (FIPRESCI), International Animated Film Association (ASIFA)

== Filmography (experimental / animations) ==
- 106 Olney Street (2007)
- Sicilian Flea (2008)
- Panta Rhei (2008)
- Aquatura (2010)
- Panta Rhei Bis (2011)
- Kinefaktura (2012)
- AE (2012)
- The Red Double Bass (2013)
- FFF1 (2013)
- F.I.T. (2013)
- Haiku (2015)
- Mono Canne (2015)
- Watch Your Thoughts (2015)
- FH (2015)
- Stone Story (2016)
- Monument (2016)
- White Curtain (2016)
- Theatrum Magicum (2017)
- Sculptor with a Camera (2018)
- Jellyfish (2018)
- Sunset (2019)
- Arrow Board Game (2021)
- Der Blaue Reiter (2021)
- Tide (2021)

== Filmography (documentaries) ==
- A James Barnhill Portrait, with Peter O'Neill (1994)
- Jerzy Sołtan. Człowiek, który Polski nie zbudował [Jerzy Sołtan, The Man Who Never Built Poland], with Sławomir Grünberg (1995)
- Ubu Roi: A Hundred Years After The Premiere (1996)
- I Am Providence: A Story of H.P. Lovecraft and His City, with Agnieszka Taborska (1997)
- The Making a “Hand-e-over", with Peter O'Neill (1997)
- Unorthodox Geometry, with Peter O'Neill (1998)
- The Island of Jan Lenica (1998)
- Daniel Szczechura’s Travels (2005)
- Alfred Schreyer from Drohobycz (2010)
- A Magic-Lantern Life: The Story of The American Magic Lantern Theater (2014, with Peter O’Neill)
- RISD Cabaret Story (2021)

== Awards at film festivals (selection) ==
- FFF1, "IFS" Independent Filmmakers Showcase, Los Angeles/Beverly Hills/Santa Monica, 2014: The Best Experimental Short
- Monument, Black Maria Film Festival, New Jersey, 2017: Jury's Choice Award; The Fresh Stream Experimental Film Festival, LA, 2016: Best Experimental Animated Film; Veracruz Short Film Festival, Mexico, 2018: Best Experimental Short Film
- Theatrum Magicum, Festival Internacional de Cine Santa Cruz, 2017: Best Experimental Short; Polish Short Film Festival, Las Vegas, NV: 2 Silver Sava Awards (Best Film and Best Cinematography); International Independent Film Awards, Encino, CA, USA, 2017: Diamond Award for Costume Design; Black Maria Film Festival, New Jersey, 2018: Jury's Choice; Best Fiction Film Festival on MovieScreenPro, Los Angeles, CA, 2018: Audience Award; Inca Imperial International Film Festival, Lima, Peru, 2018: Best Experimental Short Film
- Sunset, ArteNonStopFestival, Argentina, 2019: Mención Especial; Short Stop International Film Festival, Romania, 2020: Best Experimental; The Unprecedented Cinema, Tallinn, 2020: Best Animation; Stop Motion Film Festival, Barcelona, 2020: Special Mention

== Books published (selection) ==
- Limeryki [Limericks], Krakow, Budapest, Syracuse: Austeria, 2023
- Blues, Krakow, Budapest, Syracuse: Austeria, 2022
- Kino—Media—Sztuka—Twórcy. Szkice [Cinema—Media—Art.—Artists: Essays, Warsaw: Polish-Japanese Academy of Information Technology], 2017
- Wenders do domu! Europejskie filmy o Ameryce i ich recepcja w Stanach Zjednoczonych [Wenders Go Home! European Films on America and Their Reception in the US], Gdansk: slowo/obraz terytoria, 2006
- Słownik kierunków, ruchów i kluczowych pojec sztuki II połowy XX wieku [Dictionary of Movements and Key Notions of Art of the 2nd Half of the 20th Century], Gdansk: slowo/obraz terytoria, 2002
- Koniec i co dalej? Szkice o postmodernizmie, sztuce współczesnej i końcu wieku [The End and What Next? Essays on Postmodernism, Contemporary Art, and the End of the Century], Gdansk: slowo/obraz terytoria, 2001
- Nie tylko Disney [Disney Was Not the Only One], Warsaw: WAiF & PWN, 2000
- Awangarda wobec kina. Film w kregu polskiej awangardy artystycznej w dwudziestoleciu międzywojennym [Avant-Garde and Cinema: Film in Polish Avant-Garde Circles Between the Wars], Warsaw: Wydawnictwo małe, 1996
- Walka o film artystyczny w międzywojennej Polsce [A Battle for Artistic Film in Poland Between the Wars], Warsaw: PWN, 1989

== Photography in publications ==
- Polubić muzykę coutry. Dziennik amerykańskiej podróży [Getting to Like Country Music: A Journal of an American Cross-Country Trip], by Agnieszka Taborska, Warsaw: NOWA, 1995
- Okruchy amerykańskie [American Crumbs], by Agnieszka Taborska, Warsaw: Twój Styl, 2006
- Providence, by Agnieszka Taborska, Krakow, Budapest, Syracuse: Austeria, 2017
- Paryż surrealistyczny [Surrealist Paris], by Agnieszka Taborska, Krakow, Budapest, Syracuse: Austeria, 2017
- Bretania [Brittany], by Agnieszka Taborska, Krakow, Budapest, Syracuse: Austeria, 2018
- Blues, Krakow, Budapest, Syracuse: Austeria, 2018
