= Pod prąd =

Polish weekly Marxist newspaper (1934 - 1936)

Pod prąd ('Against the current') was a Polish weekly Marxist newspaper published between 1934 and 1936, issued by dissidents from the Communist Party of Poland that turned against the Soviet Union. The newspaper was founded by Andrzej Stawar. The other main figure in the Pod prąd venture was Roman Jabłonowski. The newspaper was sold openly in the 1930s and wasn't confiscated.

The newspaper was sold openly in the 1930s under the Sanation regime and wasn't confiscated what was one of the reasons of Polish Communists believing the Anti-Stalinists to be traitors who aided the Polish government with anti-Soviet propaganda; they even suspected that the government "intentionally smuggled" the newspaper in "communist-filled prisons." Aleksander Wat despite agreeing with Stawar and helping it by reading over articles and making suggestions never contributed to it by writing any materials, as he regarded it as "aiding the enemies" of "homeland of the proletariat". Isaac Deutscher was never involved with the newspaper as it was critical not only of Stalin, but also of Trotsky, but in 1937 he joined the subsequent publication Current (Polish: Nurt).

Even though Pod prad operated on the margins of the Communist Party, the publication had a profound influence over the intellectuals of the party.
