= Dzików, Tarnobrzeg =

District of Tarnobrzeg

Coordinates: 50°34′45″N 21°40′32″E

Dzików דזשיקעוו
- Osiedle
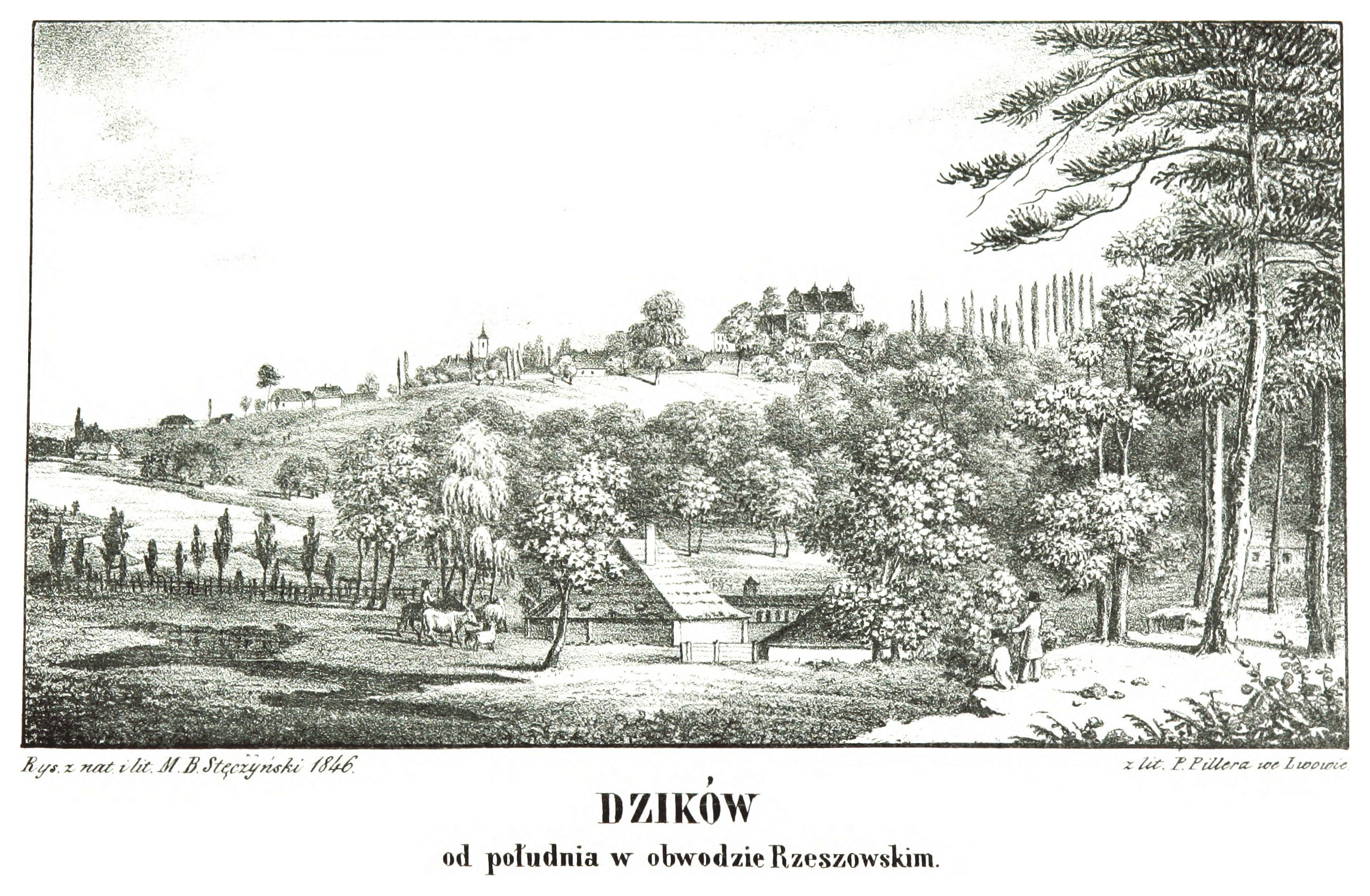
- A 19th century lithograph of Dzików by Maciej Bogusz Stęczyński. From the collections of the British Library
- Interactive map of Dzików
- Country: Poland
- Voivodeship: Podkarpackie
- Region: Sandomierz Basin
- City: Tarnobrzeg
- Incorporated: 1 October 1976

Government
  - Type: Zarząd
  - Body: Osiedla Dzików
  - Chairman: Krzysztof Kapuściak
- SIMC: 0980122
- Vehicle registration: RT

Dzików (Latin: Dzikovia; Yiddish: דזשיקעוו: Dzhikev; Hebrew: דזיקוב: Dzhikov (Note: also the traditional Jewish name of Tarnobrzeg)) is an osiedle, and one of the oldest parts of Tarnobrzeg, Poland. It is a cultural and historical center of the town. Dzików is famous as the private property of the Tarnowski family, who built the Dzików Castle here.

Several important events took place here, such as the 1734 Dzików Confederation, and the 1927 Stronnictwo Prawicy Narodowej party's congress. Currently, Dzików is popular among residents of Tarnobrzeg because of the picturesque 19th century park, which surrounds the castle. In the early 1990s, in Wymysłów, north of the palace and park, a new district of blocks of flats was built.

Dzików Castle itself was built in the mid-14th century, during the reign of Casimir the Great. It had a stone tower, and its purpose was to guard the Vistula. In the 15th century, it fell into ruin, and its renovation did not begin until the early 17th century. Dzików Castle was home to Our Lady of Dzików, and local people believed that during the Deluge, their prayers were heard by the Lady. This came to Church officials, and on 11 November 1675 in Kielce, the Bishop of Kraków Andrzej Trzebicki recognized the painting as miraculous. This decision led to the invitation of Dominican friars, whose task was to protect the painting. The owners of Dzików, Jan Tarnowski and his wife Zofia Barbara née Firley, founded a monastery, to which the painting was moved on May 20, 1678. The construction of the monastery itself was not completed until 1782.

== See also ==
- Jan Słomka (1842–1932), mayor
