= Agnieszka Taborska =

Polish writer, specialist in Surrealism, translator, and educator

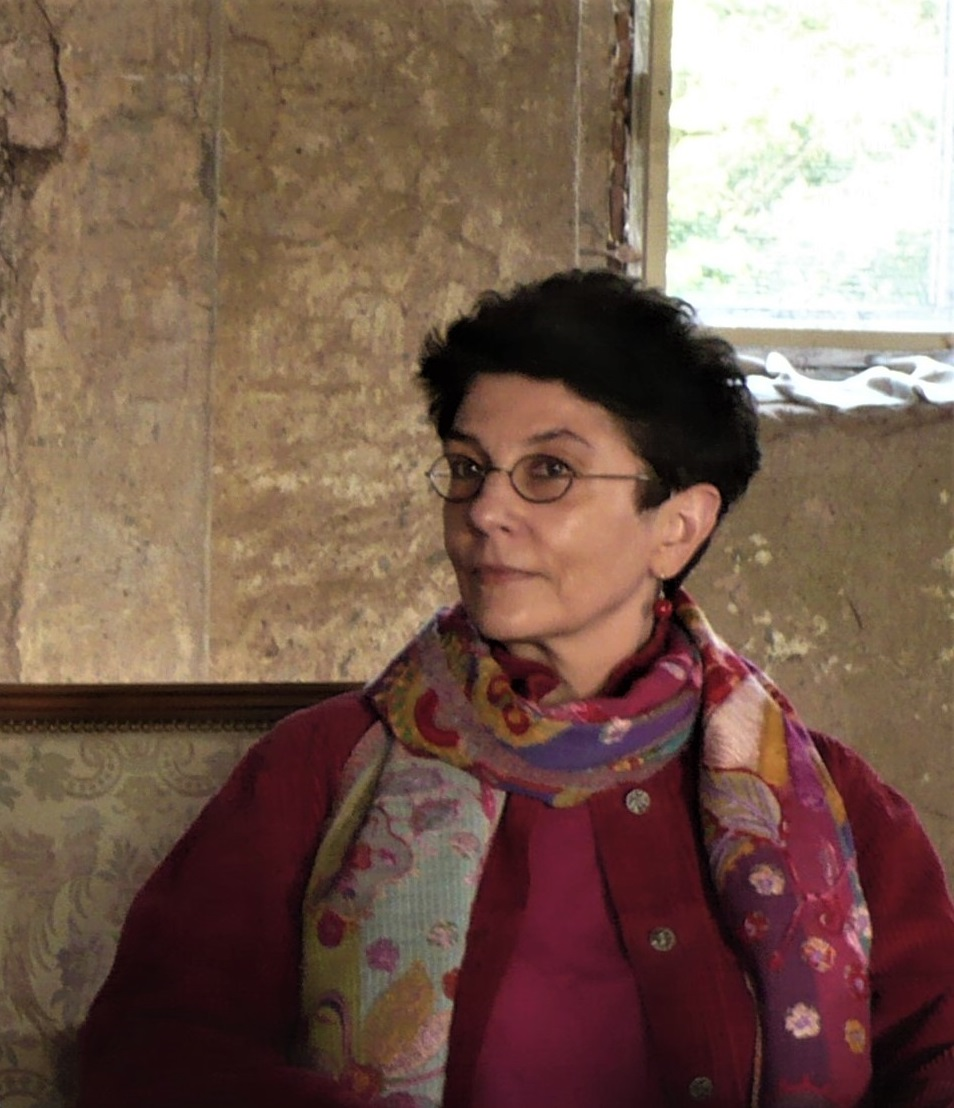
- Born: 13 January 1961 (age 65); Warsaw, Poland
- Occupations: Writer; art historian; specialist in surrealism; translator; educator

Agnieszka Taborska (born 1961 in Warsaw) is a Polish writer, art historian, specialist in Surrealism, translator, and educator.

== Life and work ==
She received MAs from the University of Warsaw (art history, 1986 and French philology, 1987). She lives in Warsaw and Providence, Rhode Island.

Taborska has been a lecturer on European art, film and literature at the Rhode Island School of Design since 1988. Her main areas of interest are French surrealism and how women are portrayed in Western art and literature of the late 19th and early 20th century.

She has curated exhibitions of Surrealist art in France and Poland.

From 1996 to 2004, she taught at the Pont Aven School of Contemporary Art.

She is the author of essays, short stories, books for children, and novels in which her humor, care for language, and knowledge of Surrealism play important role. Her books have been translated into English, French, German, Spanish, Japanese, and Korean. They have been illustrated by eminent artists such as Józef Wilkoń, Lech Majewski, Antoni Boratyński, Franciszek Maśluszczak, Andrzej Klimowski, Mieczysław Wasilewski, Selena Kimball, Krystyna Lipka-Sztarbałło, and Aleksandra Gołębiewska.

Films (Crazy Clock and A Fisherman at the Bottom of the Sea, made in 2009 and 2011 by Leszek Gałysz; theatre plays (The Office of Lost Dreams, based on The Dreaming Life of Leonora de la Cruz, by the Compagnie Miettes de Spectacle, Paris, 2010 and The Black Imp never sleeps, Teatr Uszyty, Krakow, 2016); an opera (The Unfinished Life of Phoebe Hicks, Społeczny Chór Czarnego Karła, Bydgoszcz, 2019), and a radio play (Someone is Knocking at the Wall, Teatr Miniatura, Gdańsk, 2015) have been adapted from her works.

She has written adapted screenplays for animated films based on her children's books as well as scripts for documentary films on art.

Agnieszka Taborska has also collaborated with numerous Polish art, literature, and film magazines: Literatura na Świecie, Tygodnik Powszechny, Gazeta Wyborcza, Czas Kultury, Obieg, Machina, Film na Świecie, Kwartalnik Filmowy, and dwutygodnik.com.

She has translated authors such as Philippe Soupault, Roland Topor, Gisèle Prassinos, and Spalding Gray into Polish.

== Novels ==
- Człowiek, który czeka. Pandemia na mansardzie [A Woman Awaiting. The Pandemic from the Garret], Lokator, Kraków, 2020. (excerpts published in Asymptote Journal)
- Niedokończone życie Phoebe Hicks [The Unfinished Life of Phoebe Hicks], Słowo/obraz terytoria, Gdańsk, 2013 (excerpts published in The Guardian and Body Literature).
- Senny żywot Leonory de La Cruz [The Dreaming Life of Leonora de la Cruz], Słowo/obraz terytoria, Gdańsk, 2004; extended edition 2011 (La vida soñolienta de Leonora de la Cruz, translated by Xavier Farré, AUIEO, Ciudad Mexico, 2014; La Vie songeuse de Leonora de La Cruz, translated by Véronique Patte, Interférences Paris, 2007; The Dreaming Life of Leonora de la Cruz, translated by Danusia Stok and Agnieszka Taborska, MidMarch Arts Press, New York 2007; theatre adaptation by Compagnie Miettes de Spectacles.)

== Short stories ==
- Nie tak jak w raju [Not as in Paradise], Austeria, Kraków, Budapest, Syracuse, 2013 (excerpts published in Best European Fiction 2017, Dalkey Archive Press).
- Wieloryb, czyli przypadek obiektywny [A Whale, or Objective Chance], Czarne, Wołowiec, 2010 (excerpts in In Translation).

== Essays ==
- Crazy, Real, Supernatural! The World of the Surrealists
- Miejsce wybrane [A Chosen Place], Austeria, Kraków, Budapest, Syracuse, 2019.
- Salomé une fois encore, Introduction to Oscar Wilde's Salomé, Editions Interférences, Paris, 2019.
- The Sea, or the Poet at Work
- Paryż surrealistyczny [Surrealist Paris], Austeria, Kraków, Budapest, Syracuse, 2017 (translated into French by Véronique Patte).
- Providence, Austeria, Kraków, Budapest, Syracuse, 2017.
- Bretania [Brittany], Austeria, Kraków, Budapest, Syracuse, 2018 (translated into French by Nathalie Le Marchand).
- Spiskowcy wyobraźni. Surrealizm [Conspirators of Imagination. Surrealism], słowo/obraz terytoria, Gdańsk, 2007, 2013.
- Okruchy amerykańskie [American Crumbs], Twój Styl, Warsaw, 2006.
- Polubić muzykę country. Dziennik amerykańskiej podróży [Getting to Like the Country Music. A Journal of an American Cross-country Trip], NOWA, Warsaw, 1995.

== Other publications ==
- Archipelagi Rolanda Topora [Archipelagoes of Roland Topor], Lokator, Krakow 2021.
- Świat zwariował. Poradnik surrealistyczny. Jak przeżyć [The World Had Gone Mad. A Surrealist Handbook How to Survive], Bosz, Olszanica 2021. (excerpts published in Asymptote Journal) Translated into the Slovak by Julia Sherwood, 2023
- ja, czyli Ja [i, or: I], Austeria, Kraków, Budapest, Syracuse, 2020.
- AbecadłoTopora [Topor's Alphabet], WAB, Warsaw, 2005.

== Children's books ==
- Nie ma to jak sąsiedzi [There is Nothing Like Neighbors], Debit, Katowice, 2019.
- Licho wie [God Knows], Bosz, Olszanica, 2018.
- Włóczykij [The Wondering Dog], Prószyński, Warsaw, 2018.
- Rybak na dnie morza [The Fisherman at the Bottom of the Sea], Czuły Barbarzyńca, Warsaw, 2015 (translated into German by Maiken Nielsen and Korean; adapted into an animated film).
- Licho i inni [The Black Imp and Other Sprites], Bosz, Olszanica, 2014.
- Szalony zegar [Crazy Clock], Twój Styl, Warsaw, 2008 (translated into German by Klaus Staemmler, adapted into an animated film).
- Księżycowe duchy [Moon Spirits], Twój Styl, Warsaw, 2008 (translated into German by Klaus Staemmler).
- Czarna Góra [Black Mountain], Twój Styl, Warsaw, 2008 (translated into Japanese).
- Blues Nosorożca [Rhinoceros’ Blues], Twój Styl, Warsaw, 2008.
- W malinowym dżemie [In a Raspberry Jam], Wydawnictwo małe, Warsaw, 1995.

== Film scripts and adaptations ==
- Phoebe Hicks, opera by Czarny Karzeł, 2018.
- Licho nie śpi, puppet theatre by Teatr Uszyty, 2016.
- Ktoś stuka za ścianą, radio opera directed by Romuald Wicza-Pokojski, 2015.
- A Fisherman at the Bottom of the Sea, directed by Leszek Gałysz, 2011.
- Crazy Clock, directed by Leszek Gałysz, 2009.
- Boltanski in Warsaw, directed by Marcin Giżycki, 2001.
- I am Providence. The story of H.P. Lovecraft and his city, directed by Marcin Giżycki, 1997.
- ‘Ubu Roi’ premiere one hundred years later, directed by Marcin Giżycki, 1996.

== Selected essays in collective books ==
- I’m sick of the Earth and the Universe, “Pavilionesque III”, Wydawnictwo Latające Oko, Walker Art Center, and Akademie výtvarných umění in Prague, pp. 74–77, 2020.
- Franciszka Themerson and the Gaberbocchus Press: Bestlookers versus Bestsellers, [in:] Mikołaj Deckert, Monika Kocot, Aleksandra Majdzińska-Koczorowicz (red.), Moving between Modes. Papers in Intersemiotic Translation, Wydawnictwo Uniwersytetu Łódzkiego, Łódź, pp. 151–159, 2020.
- Eugène Atget, Brassaï, [in:] International Encyclopedia of Surrealism, Bloomsbury Visual Arts, Oxford, 2019.
- Inséparables, [in:] Planète Topor. Abram, Roland, Nicolas, Ars Cameralis Silesiae Superioris, Katowice, 2016.
- Hans Bellmer, Unica Zürn et les femmes sans têtes, [in:] Bellmer / Visat, Muzeum Historii Katowic, Katowice, 2015.
- Surrealism in the » fortress of constructivism,” [in:] Muzeum Sztuki w Łodzi. Monografia, Muzeum Sztuki, Łódź, 2015.
- Suppressed Extravagances: Surrealist Echoes in Polish Film, Literature and Art Between the Wars (with Marcin Giżycki), [in:] Conscious Hallucinations. The Filmic Surrealism, Belleville publ. and Deutsches Filmmuseum, Frankfurt, 2014.
- Day Dreams of Wojciech J. Has, [in:] A Story of Sin. Surrealism in Polish Cinema, Korporacja Ha!Art, Krakow-Warsaw, 2010.
- And if Witkacy lived on the Seine..., Introduction [in:] Jakub Banasiak, Zmęczeni rzeczywistością, 40000 Malarzy, Warsaw, 2009.
- Topor in Ubuland [in:] Topor, l’homme élégant, „Les Cahiers de l’Humoir,” 2004.
- Carrington Leonora, [in:] Contemporary Artists, St. James Press, Detroit, New York, San Diego, San Francisco, Boston, New Haven, Waterville, London, Munich, 2002.
- Desnos Lucie “Youki,” Éluard Nusch, Kisling Renée, [in:] Dictionary of Artists’ Models, Fitzroy Dearborn Publishers, London, Chicago, 2001.

== Awards ==
- 2018: Nomination for the Book of the Year award given by the Polish section of IBBY for Włóczykij [The Wondering Dog].
- 2017: Not as in Paradise selected for Best European Fiction from Dalkey Archive.
- 2014: Best Children’s Book of the Year award given by the Festival of Children’s Literature for Licho i inni [The Black Imp and Other Sprites].
- 2010: Best Polish animated film for children award given by the Festival Ale Kino! for Szalony zegar [Crazy Clock], directed by Leszek Gałysz.
- 1996: Award for the Best Book of the Month for Księżycowe duchy [Moon Spirits] from the German Academy of Children's Literature.
- 1995: Award for the Best Book of the Month for Szalony zegar [Crazy Clock] from the German Academy of Children's Literature.

== Reviews ==
- A Resurgence of Surrealism? Taborska and Bartelik in New York [archive]

== Interviews with Agnieszka Taborska (in Polish) ==
- Świat zwariował. Poradnik surrealistyczny. Jak przeżyć [archive]
- A co, jeśli umrzemy, nie mając pojęcia o własnym geniuszu [archive]
- Godzina bez fikcji - odc. 33 - Wojciech Szot, Agnieszka Taborska [archive]
- Jak żyć surrealistycznie [archive]
- Świat zwariował. Jak szukać pomocy w surrealizmie [archive]
- Śniadanie mistrzów [archive]
- Zawsze jestem za wieloznacznością [archive]
- Autograf:Agnieszka Taborska, "Senny żywot Leonory de la Cruz" [archive]
- Instytut Imaginacji działa pełną parą | Tygodnik Powszechny [archive]
- Wyborcza.pl [archive]
- Dyskretny urok mistyfikacji [archive]
- Wywiad z Agnieszką Taborską na temat książki "Licho i inni" i surrealizmu [archive]
- „Nigdy nic nie wiadomo” – rozmowa z Agnieszką Taborską [archive]
- Agnieszka Taborska – Czego może nauczyć się "poważny" pisarz, pisząc książkę dla dzieci? [archive]
