= Julia Zabłocka =

Polish historian

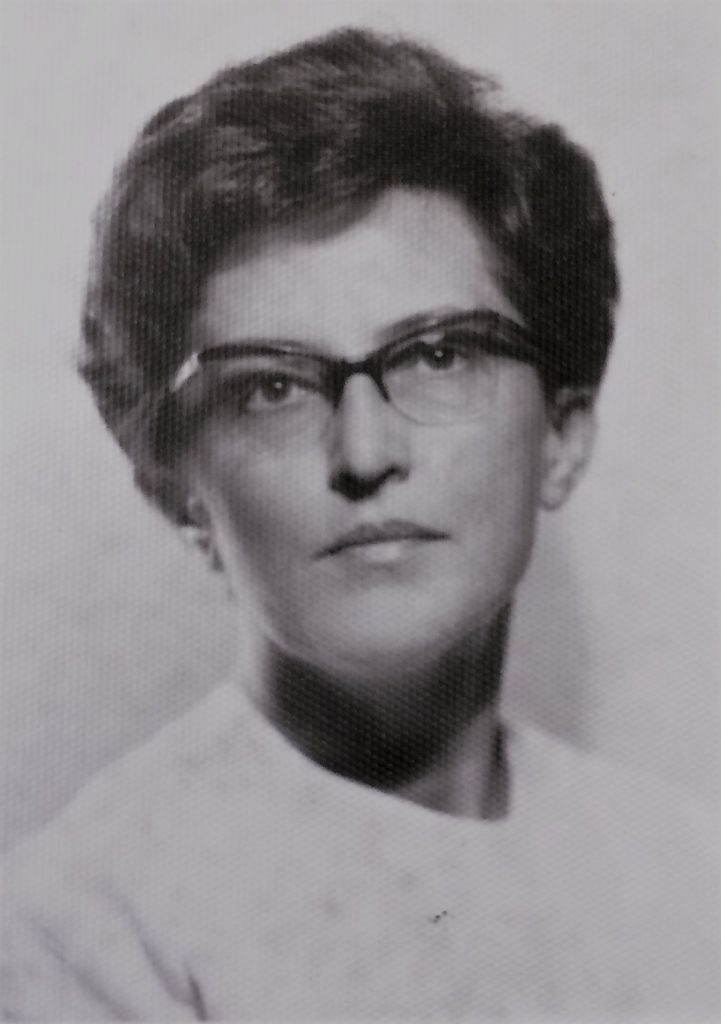
Julia Zabłock (1971)

Rosalia Julianna (Julia) Zabłocka (1931–1993) was a Polish classical scholar, historian and archaeologist who pioneered research on the ancient history of the Middle East at the Adam Mickiewicz University in Poznań. In the late 1970s, she participated in archaeology developments in Iraq and was particularly active in the excavations of the Novae Fortress in today's Bulgaria. In 1982 she published an authoritative history of the Near East in Antiquity. In 1984, she was appointed professor of ancient history at the Adam Mickiewicz University.

== Early life and education ==
Born on 14 February 1931 in Zabrze, Upper Silesia, Julianna Rozalia Zabłocka was the daughter of Pawel Zabłocki and Gertrude née Anderski. After losing her father and siblings at an early age, she was brought up by her mother with whom she cultivated a very close relationship. Living in the German-Polish border area, she attended a German-speaking elementary school (1937–1941) then a school in Mikulczyce near Zabrze (1941–1944), followed by a Polish-speaking high school where she matriculated in 1950. Thanks to a scholarship, she then studied history at the Lenin University in Kazan, USSR. She earned a master's degree in 1955 with a dissertation on ancient history.

== Career ==
In 1956, Zabłocka returned to Poland to become a lecturer at the Department of Ancient History at the Adam Mickiewicz University under Tadeusz Zawadzki (1919–2008). In 1962, she was appointed assistant professor in the newly named Department of Universal Ancient History. The same year she earned a PhD with a thesis on the Economic Foundations of the Anatolian Aristocracy. This led to a two-year scholarship with the Institute of Oriental Studies at the Academy of Sciences in Leningrad where she specialized in assyriology and ancient languages of the Near East under Igor M. Diakonoff. Thereafter she returned to the Adam Mickiewicz University where she was appointed head of the Department of Ancient History in 1983, a post she held until 1991.

Following a visit to Iraq in 1977, Zabłocka devoted keen interest to archaeological investigations, especially the development of cities in the Near East. In today's' Bulgaria, she participated in the excavations of the Roman town of Novae. One of her main concerns was Assyrian property, not only in connection with the palace and temples but also matters of private property. These considerations led to her most highly regarded work, Historia Bliskiego Wschodu w starożytności (History of the Near East in Antiquity), first published in 1982 and revised in 1987.

Zabłocka participated in many international conferences, presenting the results of her research. In Munich at the 18th Rencontre Assyriologique (1970) she addressed Assyrian dependent farmers while at the Šulmu conference on the ancient Near East in Budapest (1974), she presented a paper on the development of the commune in the neo-Assyrian period. In 1978, at the Catholic University of Louvain, she examined relationships between temple and palace in the Middle Assyrian state and in Leipzig the following year, she spoke on the demography of Nineveh in the 8th-7th century BC. In 1989, together with Stefan Zawadzki, she organized her own Šulmu conference in Poznań in September 1989, where the two presented a paper on "Everyday life in ancient Near East".

Julia Zabłocka died unexpectedly in Poznań on 29 March 1993, aged only 62.
