= Daniel Koziarski =

Polish novelist and lawyer

Daniel Koziarski (11 January 1979 Gdynia) is a Polish novelist and lawyer. He graduated from the university of Gdańsk. He publishes articles in Polish newspapers (Gazeta Polska published his series of satirical stories Opowiadania poprawne) and on the Internet.

== Works ==
He published his debut novel Kłopoty to moja specjalność, czyli kroniki socjopaty (Troubles are my specialization; or, the Chronicles of a sociopath) in February 2007 to a critical acclaim in the Polish press and in Newsweek. Its main character, Tomasz Płachta, is a master in complicating not only his life, but also the lives of people around him. The sequel to this novel, Socjopata w Londynie (Sociopath in London), published in August 2007, follows the life of Tomasz in London. In July 2008 his third novel, Klub samobójców (The Suicide Club) was published. In a review of the book, Piotr Kofta wrote: 'Koziarski's new book shows that the Polish popular literature now chooses topics so far covered by the "high literature"'. Koziarski also wrote a story Dziewięć żyć kota Alberta (The Nine Lives of Albert the Tomcat) for an anthology that appeared in October 2008; he is now working on the third and final book of his 'Sociopath' series.

== Bibliography ==
Novels:

- Kłopoty to moja specjalność, czyli kroniki socjopaty (Troubles are my specialty: Chronicles of a Sociopath) (2007)
- Socjopata w Londynie (A Sociopath in London) (2007)
- Klub samobójców (Suicide Club) (2008)

Participation in anthologies:

- Opowiadania pod psem i kotem (2008)
