= Isacque Graeber =

American historian (1905–1984)

Isacque Graeber

Isacque (Isaac) Graeber (August 29, 1905 – 1984) was a sociologist, Jewish historian, and writer. He wrote several books and numerous papers ranging in subject matters from Jewish-Gentile relations to Jewish Education. He studied at Columbia University and University of Pennsylvania. During his long career he served as director of the College of Jewish Studies in Kansas City, and Director of Education to the Jewish community of Akron, Ohio.

== Biography ==
=== Early years ===
Isacque Graeber was born August 29, 1905, in Warsaw, Congress Poland, Russian Empire of ethnic Jewish parents. He earned a PhD, however the title or topic of his dissertation is unknown. He emigrated in 1921 and by the late 1920s he began contributing articles to various journals, and by 1935 was working on his book titled, "Jews in a Gentile World."

As a staunch opponent of fascism, Graeber was active in the Communist Party USA-sponsored League of American Writers and attended the organization's second congress in 1937.

In 1941, Graeber was temporarily employed by Max Horkheimer's Institute of Social Research (through Franz L. Neumann) as an agent to solicit funding on commission from wealthy Jews for the institute's project on anti-Semitism, which eventually became the "Studies in Prejudice" series sponsored by the American Jewish Committee.

Graeber was a Fellow of the Rockefeller Foundation served as professor of Jewish studies at Columbia University and was a professor of sociology at Yeshiva University. He was also on the staff of the Jewish Education Committee of New York.

=== Writings ===
Graeber contributed to journals like Judaism, Jewish Life, The Jewish Forum and Jewish Education. As well as to non-Jewish journals like Social Research and Panorama.

In 1942 he edited and published the seminalJews in a Gentile World, a collection of essays by eighteen widely published experts in sociology, anthropology, psychology, political science, economics, history, and philosophy who contributed objective examinations of the problems of anti-Semitism. The authors utilized social science findings to analyze practical issues that face both Jew and non-Jew. The book also included his own essay.

Contributors included Carleton S. Coon Professor of Anthropology at the University of Pennsylvania, Talcott Parsons Harvard University Carl Joachim Friedrich Harvard University and Everett V. Stonequist, Skidmore College.

He wrote on many topics, however most of his focus was on Jewish topics. Titles of his articles include "The Financial Role of Jews in America," "An Examination of Theories of Race Prejudice," and "The Alliance Israelite Universelle: A Historical Evaluation."

In 1946 he published a pamphlet titled "The Truth About Anti-Semitism" which was a call for the establishment of a Jewish homeland in Palestine.

He also authored a textbook titled "The History of Zionism" which was prepared for the use by "Zionist study circles". It was published by the Zionist Organization of America.

=== Death and legacy ===
Isacque Graeber died in 1984.
