= Malwina Garfeinowa-Garska =

Malwina Garfeinowa-Garska (15 October 1870 in Warsaw – 19 September 1932 in Kraków), pseudonym Maria Zabojecka, was a Polish literary critic, translator from Scandinavian literature, prosaist and writer. She was the sister of Stanisław Posner.

Garfeinowa-Garska was an activist in independent, socialist and emancipation movements, and, from 1896, a member of Związek Zagraniczny Socjalistów Polskich. She was an editor of Krytyka (1899). From 1921 she used the pseudonym Maria Zabojecka. In her critical works Garfeinowa-Garska supported art which was relevant to social and political life.

== Notable works ==
- Gromnice (1907), a sociopsychological novel
- Powieść o duszy polskiej (1912), an essay
