= Jan Słomka =

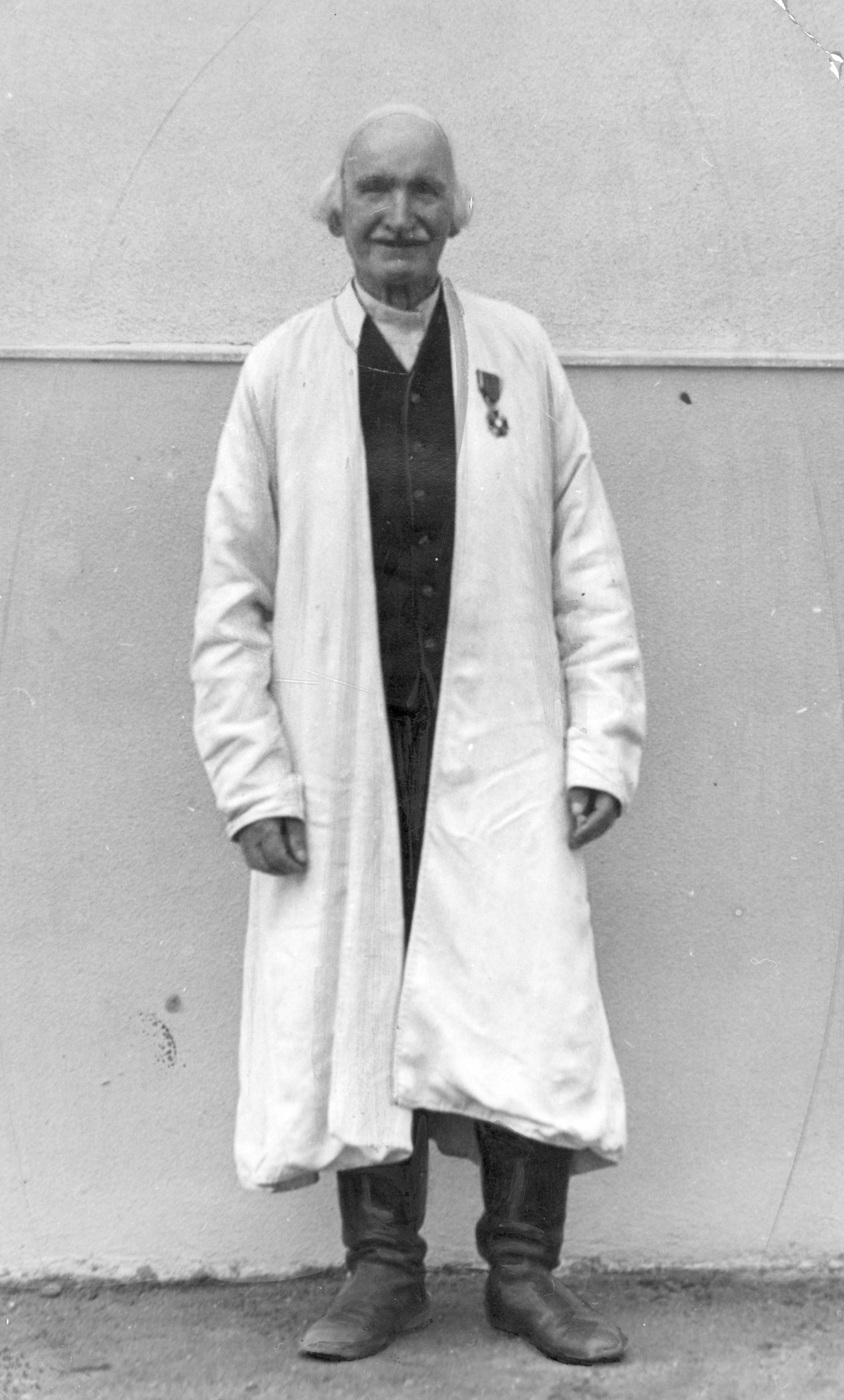
- A portrait of Słomka taken during Ignacy Mościcki's visit to the Tarnowski family, 1929. From the collections of the National Digital Archives
- Born: Jan Bartłomiej Słomka; 22 June 1842; Dzików, Kingdom of Galicia and Lodomeria, Austrian Empire
- Died: 26 March 1932 (aged 89); Dzików, Lwów Voivodeship, Second Polish Republic
- Resting place: Cmentarz Parafii pw. Wniebowzięcia NMP
- Education: second grade (primary school)
- Occupation: Wójt
- Spouse: Marianna (Maria) Słomka née Tworek
- Writing career
- Language: Polish
- Notable work: Pamiętniki włościanina od pańszczyzny do dni dzisiejszych

Wójt of Dzików
- In office July 1887 – 14 November 1918
- Monarch: Franz Joseph I
- Succeeded by: Office dissolved during Republic

Jan Słomka (1842–1932) was the Habsburg Polish wójt of Dzików in the late 19th and early 20th century.

Słomka is perhaps best known for his memoir, From Serfdom to Self-Government: Memoirs of a Polish Village Mayor, with its descriptions of Polish peasant life from the time of Polish serfdom until after World War I.

== Published works ==
Serfdom to Self-Government. Memoirs of a Polish village mayor, 1842-1927 by Jan, Wojt w Dzikowie Slomka (Author) and translated by William John Rose (Minerva Publishing Co., 1941)
