= Lidia Bajkowska =

Polish writer

- Born: Warsaw, Poland
- Occupations: Novelist, Pianist
- Writing career
- Genres: Drama, Children psychology and education, music education

Lidia Bajkowska is a Polish author of children's educational music books, novelist, and educator.

== Early life and education ==
In 1981, she completed doctoral studies at the Faculty of Composition, Conducting and Music Theory at the Frederic Chopin Music Academy in Warsaw.

From an early age, she is strongly related to the piano playing.

== Career ==
She hands her love for the music down to generations of children and youth, acting with disinterested passion for the culture and art. She is a precursor of promulgating the idea of "musical zero-level class" in first degree art schools (instead of preliminary exams).

For the Tale about song and notes published in 1992 by Polish Scientific Publishers PWN, Lidia Bajkowska was awarded by Minister of Culture and Art. The book was recommended by Ministry of National Education as a textbook; was covered by the fund to promote Polish literature and inscribed on the prestigious list of the Institute of Books.

In 1995, Tale of song and notes for the essential, methodological, literary and graphic values was awarded and signed by UNICEF by the graphic symbol entry for a book. Subsequent releases, The magic piano, The kidnapping of Beauty Note, and The theater of dreams were published by Proszynski i S-ka Publishing. This book is the first one in series that open the door to the world of music and musical notation, created owing to a sensational method, children can read notes and play them on the keyboard. The method was created because of the idea of special "zero-level class" (nursery, infant school - level, integrated with them or separated units) "zero-level class" uncovers the natural musical abilities in children, and open the way to the musical world for every child.

The music books of Lidia Bajkowska enjoy the recognition as an innovative and effective. The kidnapping of Beauty Note served as a script for the play The kidnapping of tiny Note, which premiered in 1998 in the Theater of Young Viewer of TVP2, directed by Lena Szurmiej, music by Piotr Rubik and stage design by Julita Sander. The spectacle starring, inter alia, Joanna Trzepiecińska, Artur Żmijewski, Karolina Dryzner, Paweł Deląg, Agnieszka Sitek, and E. Porębska as the beauty Note.

The dream about music is another publication from the educational series of children's music books.

== Works ==
- "Tale about song and notes", Polish Scientific Publishers PWN, Warsaw. First edition - 1992, second edition -1995, third edition - 1996,
- "The magic piano", Proszynski i S-ka Publishing, Warsaw, published in 1997,
- "The kidnapping of Beauty Note" Proszynski i S-ka Publishing, Warsaw, issued in 1998,
- "The theatre of dreams", Proszynski i S-ka Publishing, Warsaw, published in 1998,
- "Methodological guidance for Tale about song and notes", Polish Scientific Publishers PWN, Warsaw, First edition -1995, second edition - 1996,
- "The kidnapping of tiny Note" - a play (mini-opera) with music by Piotr Rubik, premiered in 1998 in the Theater of Young Viewer of TVP2, starring: J. Trzepiecińska, A. Zmijewski, P. Deląg, A. Sitek, and others.
- The dream about music, 2009

== Awards ==
- Award of the Ministry of Culture and Arts in 1992 for lifetime achievements in pedagogical and artistic work as well as the music textbook "Tale about song and notes".
- Numerous awards, diplomas, distinctions and thanks for teaching and educational work.
- Diplomas for first place in competitions, concerts, children's and youth performances, as well as numerous awards and acknowledgments.
