= Natalia Korwin-Szymanowska =

Polish writer, journalist, and translator (1857–1952)

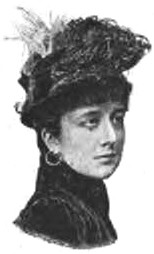
- 1893 portrait
- Born: Natalia Krzyżanowska; 1857; Warsaw Governorate, Kingdom of Poland
- Died: October 1922 (aged 64–65); Pruszków, Poland
- Occupations: Writer, journalist, translator
- Writing career
- Pen name: Anatol Krzyżanowski

Natalia Korwin-Szymanowska (1858–1922), née Krzyżanowska, also known by the pen name Anatol Krzyżanowski, was a Polish writer and translator active in the late 19th and early 20th centuries. She was born in 1858 in the Kalisz region and died in October 1922 in Pruszków near Warsaw.

Korwin-Szymanowska wrote journalistic articles published in Warsaw-based press outlets and wrote about Polish literary events for French and English magazines. Her literary works, which included contemporary-themed short stories and novels, gained significant popularity during her time. Notable works include the novels Dwa prądy (1890), Pasierby (Volumes 1–2, 1896–97), and Ogniwa (1904). Her novel Dwa prądy was awarded in a literary competition organized by the Kurier Warszawski.
