= Nela The Little Reporter =

Polish travel writer (born 2005)

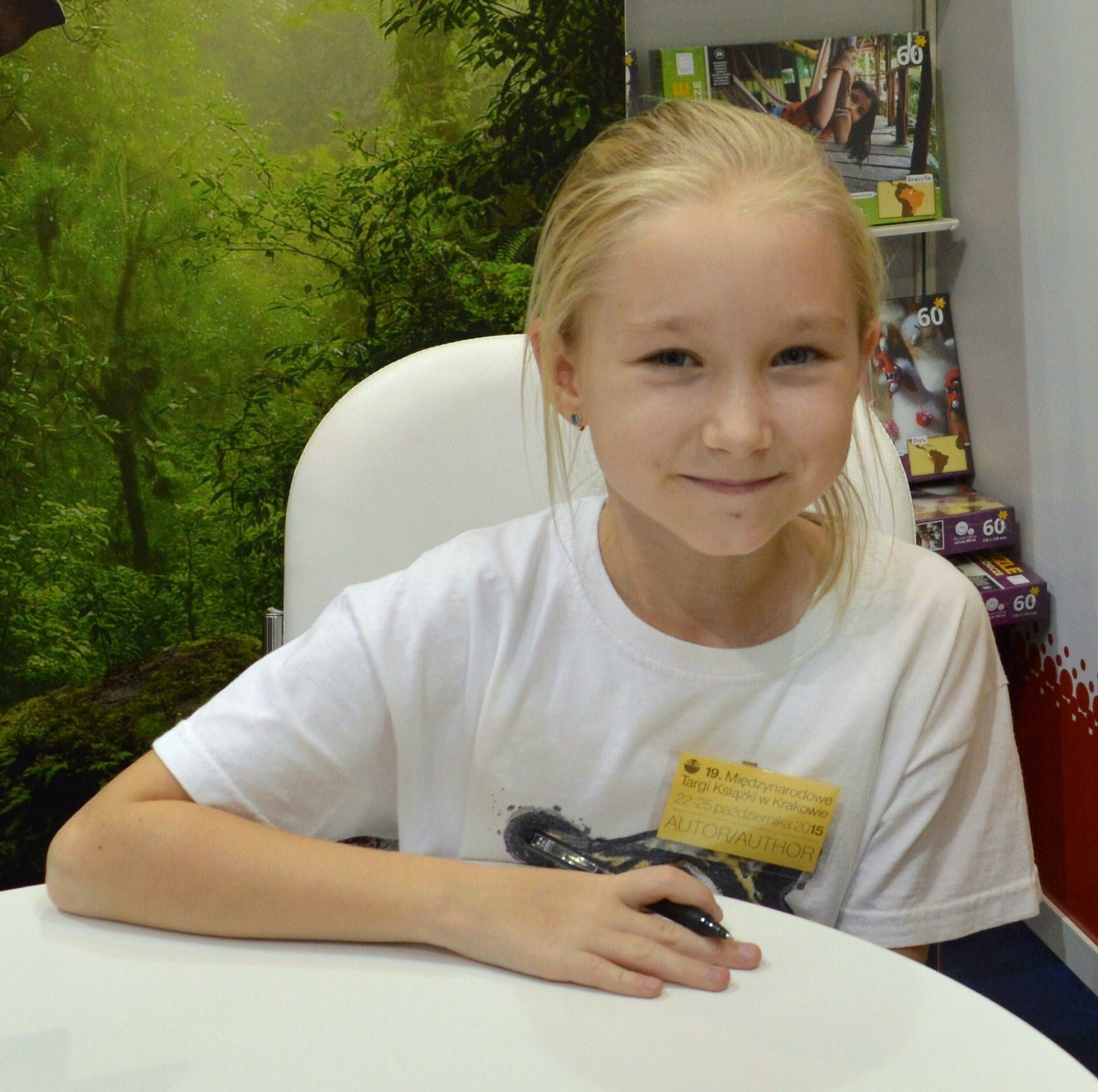
Nela The Little Reporter at an author's meeting in 2015

Nela The Little Reporter (Polish: "Nela Mała Reporterka", born in 2005) is a Polish traveler, as well as the writer of travel books for children and TV programs aired on National Polish TV TVP ABC.

== Biography ==
Her nickname ("Nela The Little Reporter") is associated with the series of children's books she has created, in which she takes on the main role. Nela has been traveling around the world since the age of five. According to the publisher, Nela travels with her parents who document the trips and then produce programs in which she stars. Her travel series was presented at the International Festival of Educational Production for Children in Japan - Japan Prize.

Nela is also the author of books that were created with editorial help from her parents. The first book "Nela's 10 amazing adventures" (pol. "10 niesamowitych przygód Neli") was published in 2014 when Nela was 8 years old. From that year on, Nela has appeared in a television program broadcast by the public Polish Television TVP 1, and then on TVP ABC. From 2019, her reportages can also be seen on TVP POLONIA around the world. From 2020, Nela's books have been published by Willson Media, which is also responsible for the preparation and post-production of her film reports.

In the years 2016-2017, she hosted her own weekly broadcast program on a radio called "Radio For You" (pol. "Polskie Radio RDC").

As a teenager, Nela actively participates in social and humanitarian activities. In 2019, she was the informal ambassador of the interactive stand of the Ministry of Foreign Affairs (Poland) and the European Commission, created for children and youth in the Humanitarian Town at the International Humanitarian Fair. Participating in the event, among others, was Deputy Secretary-General of the United Nations for Humanitarian Aid Mark Lowcock. During the fair, Nela was visited by Polish President Andrzej Duda.

Currently (since 2020) Nela is developing an educational and research project as part of "The Adventure Starts Here Foundation" she is creating. The foundation will build research bases around the world, where scientists and children wanting to become nature scientists will be invited. The first research base is to be built in a jungle in Costa Rica.

== Awards ==
Nela won four Empik Bestseller Awards in a row in: 2015, 2016, 2017, 2018.

In 2015: for the book "Nela and Mysteries of the World" (pol. "Nela i tajemnice świata"). She was also the first person to receive this award at such a young age.

In 2016: in the category "Literature for children" for the book "Nela's Footsteps through the Jungles, Seas and Oceans" (pol. "Śladami Neli przez dżungle, morza i oceany").

Along with her Bestseller books, her other books were also nominated in various years.

- "Nela and Polar Animals" - (nominated for Empik Bestseller 2017) (pol. "Nela i polarne zwierzęta")
- "Nela and the Treasures of the Caribbean" (pol. "Nela i skarby Karaibów") (won Empik Bestseller for 2017)
- "Nela and The Secrets of the Oceans" - nominated for Empik Bestseller 2017 (pol. "Nela i tajemnice oceanów").
- "Nela on the Island of Paradise Birds" (pol. "Nela na wyspie Rajskich Ptaków"). (Won Empik Bestseller 2018)

Along with the Empik Bestseller Awards, she was also nominated for other awards for her books during these years. In 2017 she received the TRAVELER by National Geographic (Poland) award for her whole series of children’s travel books.

In 2016, The Ministry of National Education (Poland) has included her book "Nela on the Arctic Circle" (pol. "Nela na kole podbiegunowym") in the reading curriculum for Polish schools as supplementary reading in eighth grade of primary school.

== Books ==
Full list of Nela's books:

- "Nela's 10 amazing adventures" (pol. "10 niesamowitych przygód Neli") 2014, ISBN 978-83-7596-529-2
- "Nela on 3 continents" (pol. "Nela na 3 kontynentach") 2014, ISBN 978-83-7596-603-9
- "Nela and the Mysteries of the World" (pol. "Nela i tajemnice świata") 2015, ISBN 978-83-7596-607-7
- "Nela on the Trail of Adventure" (pol. "Nela na tropie przygód") 2015, ISBN 978-83-7596-620-6
- "Nela's Footsteps through the Jungles, Seas and Oceans" (pol. "Śladami Neli przez dżunglę, morza i oceany") 2016, ISBN 978-83-7596-626-8
- "Nela on the Arctic Circle" (pol. "Nela na kole podbiegunowym") 2016, ISBN 978-83-7596-642-8
- "Nela and The Treasures of the Caribbean" (pol. "Nela i skarby Karaibów") 2017, ISBN 978-83-7596-647-3
- "Nela and the Secrets of the Oceans" (pol. "Nela i tajemnice oceanów") 2017, ISBN 978-83-7596-644-2
- "Nela and Polar Animals" (pol. "Nela i polarne zwierzęta") 2017, ISBN 978-83-8053-309-7
- "Nela on the Island of Paradise Birds" (pol. "Nela na wyspie rajskich ptaków") 2018, ISBN 978-83-8053-366-0
- "Nela and the Secrets of Distant Łands" (pol."Nela i sekrety dalekich lądów") 2018, ISBN 978-83-8053-454-4
- "Nela and a Trip to the Heart of the Jungle" (pol. “Nela i wyprawa do serca dżungli") 2018, ISBN 978-83-805-3482-7
- "Nela and Direction Antarctica" (pol. "Nela i kierunek Antarktyda") 2019, ISBN 978-83-805-3559-6
- "Nela in the Land of Whales" (pol. "Nela w krainie orek") 2019, ISBN 978-83-805-3644-9
- "Nela on Kangaroo Island" (pol. "Nela na wyspie kangura") 2020, ISBN 978-83-954789-0-1
- "Nela's Adventure to the Depths of the Ocean" (pol. Nela i wyprawa w morskie głębiny) 2021, ISBN 978-83-954789-3-2
- "Nela in the Land of Wombats" (pol. Nela w krainie wombatów) 2021, ISBN 978-83-954789-5-6
- "Nela on Kangaroo Island" (pol. Nela na Wyspie Kangura) 2022, ISBN 978-83-954789-6-3
