= Udo of Aachen =

Fictional monk from a 1999 hoax

Udo of Aachen (c.1200–1270) is a fictional monk, a creation of British technical writer Ray Girvan, who introduced him in an April Fool's hoax article in 1999. According to the article, Udo was an illustrator and theologian who discovered the Mandelbrot set some 700 years before Benoit Mandelbrot.

Udo's works were allegedly discovered by the also-fictional Bob Schipke, a Harvard mathematician, who supposedly saw a picture of the Mandelbrot set in an illumination for a 13th-century carol. Girvan also attributed Udo as a mystic and poet whose poetry was set to music by Carl Orff with the haunting O Fortuna in Carmina Burana. Later Schipke uncovered Udo's work which described how Udo had come to this kind of design while working on a method of determining whether one's soul would reach heaven.

== Aspects of the hoax ==
The poetry of O Fortuna was actually the work of itinerant goliards, found in the German Benedictine monastery of Benediktbeuern Abbey.

The hoax was lent an air of credibility because often medieval monks did discover scientific and mathematical theories, only to have them hidden or shelved due to persecution or simply ignored because publication prior to the invention of the printing press was difficult at best. Mr. Girvan adds to this suggestion by associating Udo with several other more legitimate discoveries where an author was considered ahead of his time in terms of a scientific theory of some sort that is now established as a mainstream theory but was considered fringe science at the time.

Another aspect of the deception was that it was very common for pre-20th century mathematicians to spend incredible amounts of time on hand calculations such as a logarithm table or trigonometric functions. Calculating all of the points for a Mandelbrot set is a comparable activity that would seem tedious today but would be routine for people of the time.
