= Andrzej Stawar =

Polish writer, journalist, editor, publisher, literary critic and translator

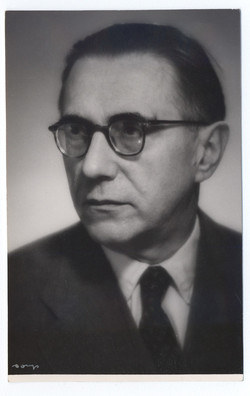
- Andrzej Stawar, 1959
- Born: Edward Janus; May 1, 1900; Warsaw, Congress Poland, Russian Empire
- Died: 5 August 1961 (aged 61); Saint-Germain-en-Laye, France
- Resting place: Powązki cemetery
- Occupations: Writer; journalist; literary critic; chief editor; publisher; translator; political activist

Andrzej Stawar (born Edward Janus, 1 May 1900 – 5 August 1961) was a Polish Marxist writer and critic and translator. He was mainly active as an anti-Stalinist political activist, journalist and avant-garde proponent in arts during the interwar period. Towards the end of his life, he became an acclaimed Marxist literary critic in the Polish People's Republic despite never demonstrating loyalty to the PZPR. The publication critical of the Soviet-based political system abroad following his death became a major event.

== Life ==
Edward Janus was born on 1 May 1900 in a family of landless peasants.

=== Communist and art critic ===
In the early 1920s, he joined the Communist Workers' Party of Poland and published his early articles in the periodicals of the left-wing peasant press. In 1924, he assumed the post of secretary to the Communist faction in the Polish parliament (Sejm), despite the party being officially banned in Poland, edited its bulletins and proclamations and wrote for the illegal press. His first conflict with the Communist Party occurred in 1926, during the May Coup by Marshal Józef Piłsudski and his Sanation movement: the party supported the coup, and Stawar became a principled critic of its "opportunism".

Stawar published his articles and essays on art and politics in the short-lived left-wing jornals Miesięcznik Literacki (Literary Monthly) ran by his close friend Aleksander Wat and in Dźwignia (Crane) published by the artist Mieczysław Szczuka. Stawar promoted Constructivism as a revolutionary artistic movement, the consciense of which "that the new art had to be revolutionary not only in form but also in all aspects regarding society" led it to decision "to produce objects of utilitarian value", and so, Szczuka was an example of a revolutionary artist for him, what was expressed by Stawar in his obituary for Szczuka. Stawar appeared to be the most prominent and sophisticated author of Dźwignia, having the most education in Marxism. As a literary critic, Stawar believed that ultimately literary criticism should serve to facilitate a change in the "mass reader's" "relationship to the whole shape of literary matters — a relationship after all created under the influence of a hostile class ideology." In 1931, the editorial board of Miesięcznik Literacki, including Wat and Stawar, were arrested. They were eventually released the same year.

=== Anti-Stalinist activist ===
Between 1934 and 1936, he issued a weekly Marxist newspaper Pod prąd (Upstream / Against the Current / Against the Stream), and in 1937, he launched another newspaper Current (Polish: Nurt). Like the Trotskyists, Stawar criticized Stalin as the representative of the ruling bureaucracy which betrayed the revolution values and reflected the values of the pre-revolutionary petit bourgeoisie. However, unlike the majority of the Communist opposition to Stalin, he was also critical of Lenin, accusing him of promoting bureaucratic centralism and turning Marxism into a dogmatic system, landing the foundations for Stalinism; significantly, his main concern with Stalin was not the abandonment of world revolution in favour of Socialism in one country, but rather the abandonment of the idea of withering away of the state in favour of statist modernization. In his newspapers, Stawar published his essays on such themes as Trotsky, the nature of Soviet bureaucracy and the difference between Bonapartism and Fascism. He also published his studies in the liberal newspaper Wiadomości Literackie. The other main figure in the Pod prąd venture was Roman Jabłonowski. Isaac Deutscher was not involved with Pod prąd, but he joined Nurt in 1937.

The newspaper was sold openly in the 1930s under the Pilsudski regime and wasn't confiscated what was one of the reasons of Polish Communists believing the Anti-Stalinists to be traitors who aided the Polish government with anti-Soviet propaganda; they even suspected that the government "intentionally smuggled" the newspapers in "communist-filled prisons." Stawar's "defection" had a painful effect on his Communist friends who had regarded him as their teacher in Marxism before and cut ties with him. Janina Broniewska, to whom Stawar had confessed his love, wrote: "Our most principled sectarian, our mentor... undergoes an evolution. He converts — like a woman of loose morals falling into religiosity in her old age — to Trotskyism." Wat despite agreeing with Stawar on Stalin and helping the newspaper by reading over articles and making suggestions never contributed to it by writing any materials, as he regarded it as "aiding the enemies" of "homeland of the proletariat."

Even though Pod prad was run only by a little group of anti-Stalinists and operated on the margins of the Communist Party, the publication had a profound influence over the party's intellectuals. In 1938, the party was dissolved by the Comintern after being accused of ideological "deviations" and "Trotskyism" among its members.

=== After World War II ===
Stawar spent World War II as a refugee in the Axis-allied Kingdom of Hungary, being involved in publishing the Polish weekly newspaper Tygodnik Polski; following the defeat of the Nazis in Hungary, Stawar helped to organize the Tymczasowy Komitet Polski (The Polish Temporary Committee). In 1945, he returned to Soviet-dominated Poland. For some time, he was able to publish his writing in Odrodzenie and Kuźnica. After Jan Kott and some other representatives of Kuźnica took the case of the former "Trotskyite" connected to Isaac Deutscher and Wiktor Alter to Jakub Berman, the latter demanded Stawar to get "down on his knees and take back all the lies he ha[d] spread about us." Stawar refused, making himself unable to be published, although Berman allowed him to submit translations under a pen name. When he was without an apartment, he lived at times with the Wats and with Irena Krzywicka.

Between the end of 1954 and 1955, Stawar was "rehabilitated" despite refusing to submit "self-criticism" for the second time and resumed writing, mostly on literary topics and studies of Polish, and some Russian, writers (Boy, Sienkiewicz, Gałczyński, Brzozowski). These essays immediately assured his position as the most eminent literary critic in Poland; however, still being an ideologically compromised figure, he did not return to journalism and politics even during the Polish October in 1956. In his writings he remained faithful to Marxism as a critical methodology.

=== Death and Last Writings ===
After falling to illness, in late 1960 he was given permission to go to the West to gather material for a book on aesthetics. In the end of July 1961, he went to Paris to publish the collection of his essays Last Writings (Pisma ostanie) in the emigre magazine Kultura, still believing to be a Trotskyist in some way. He died in August; after his body was cremated, his ashes were transported to Warsaw. Jerzy Putrament organized a state funeral with a military band, delegates of the PZPR, and a prestigious burial site at Powązki cemetery; Putrament spoke of "Comrade Stawar, the model Marxist writer and activist, faithful to the Party to the very end."

After his death but the same year, Kultura published Last Writings. Many of the articles and essays had been published by Stawar years earlier, some of them in Pod prąd in the 1930s; there were also articles critical of Nikita Khrushchev: "It is a myth that Khrushchev has put an end to Stalinism." There were some words critical of Bolshevism in general: "There is no doubt that Bolshevism contains the seeds of insanity." The book being published and smuggled into Poland became a major event. Time called it "the most devastating indictment of the Communist system since Milovan Djilas' The New Class". "But with the clandestine appearance of his Last Writings, Stawar's name and memory all but disappeared. Even the flowers that were to have decorated his grave until the first frost were hastily removed", wrote Time.

== Publications ==
=== Political writings ===
- O bonapartyzmie i faszyzmie
- Jeszcze o Antysemityzmie
- O biurokracji sowieckiej
- Historia’ Trockiego
- Pisma ostanie

=== Literary criticism ===
- Szkice literackie: wybór (1957)
- Tadeusz Żeleński (Boy) (1958)
- O Gałczyńskim (1959)
- Pisarstwo Henryka Sienkiewicza (1960)
- O Brzozowskim i inne szkice (1961)

=== Translations ===
- Leo Tolstoy. War and Peace (as Wojna i Pokoj)
- Fyodor Dostoyevsky. Poor Folk (as Biedni ludzie)
- Mikhail Sholokhov. And Quiet Flows the Don (as Cichy Don)
