= Edith Stauber =

Austrian film director and illustrator

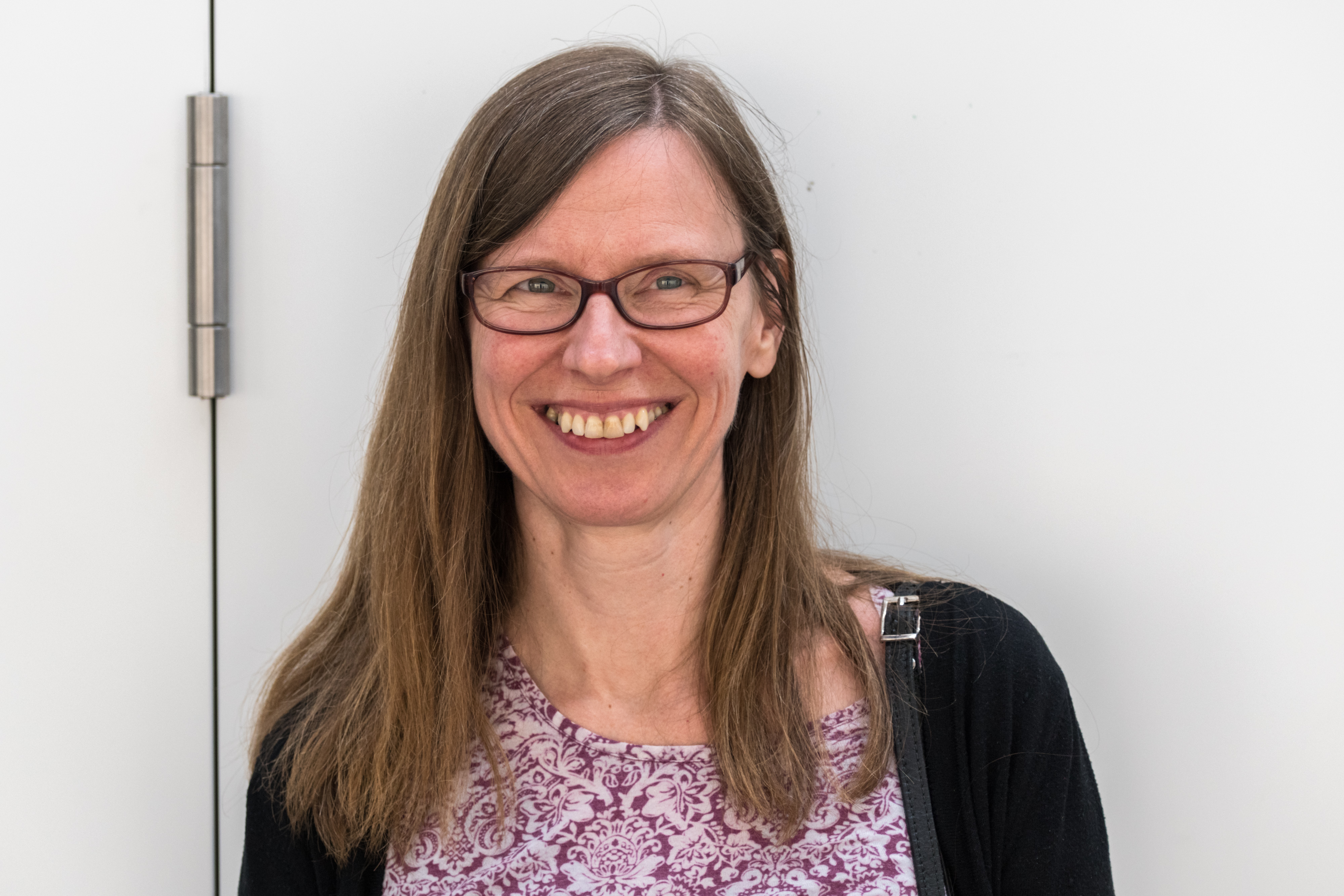
Edith Stauber (2019)

Edith Stauber (born in 1968 in Linz, Austria) is an Austrian film director and illustrator.

== Biography ==
After training as a carpenter, Stauber studied at the University of Arts Linz in 1993 in the master class for visual media design and film and video. Since 1994 she works in the field of documentary and short film, especially in drawing and animation.

Stauber lives in Linz, and has taken part in international film festivals since 2005. She created the trailer for the Crossing Europe Film Festival in 2011.

== Filmography ==
=== Animation ===
- 2008: Eintritt zum Paradies um 3€20
- 2011: Nachbehandlung
- 2014: Linz / Martinskirche
- 2015: 3 Miniaturen aus dem Leben mit 47
- 2017: Stunden Minuten Tage
- 2019: Linz / Stadtpfarrkirche

=== Documentaries ===
- 1995: Oma´s Stimme
- 2001: Der Maler schaut nicht hin
- 2001: Die Zeit ist da
- 2003: Nennen Sie drei Künstlerinnen
- 2004: Über eine Strasse
