= Xawery Stańczyk =

Polish writer, poet, sociologist

- Born: 7 June 1985 (age 41); Polish People's Republic
- Occupations: writer, poet, sociologist, researcher
- Awards: Nike Award (2014) Nomination

Academic background
- Education: University of Warsaw
- Thesis: Macie swoją kulturę: Kultura alternatywna w Polsce 1978–1996 (2016)
- Doctoral advisor: Andrzej Mencwel

Academic work
- Notable works: Skarb piratów; Handluj z tym; Macie swoją kulturę
- Website: Publications by Xawery Stańczyk at ResearchGate

Xawery Tadeusz Stańczyk is a Polish poet, sociologist and essayist.

== Life ==
Stańczyk was born in 1985 in Poland. His debut poetry book Skarb piratów (transl. Pirate Treasure) was nominated for a Nike Award. Reviews of his work have been published in Newsweek, Dwutygodnik and Art Papier amongst others. His main fields of interest are popular music, social movements, youth culture, and public spaces in socialist and post-socialist Eastern Europe.

== Education ==
Stańczyk graduated with an M.A in cultural studies (2009) as well as a Ph.D. (2015) from the Institute of Polish Culture, University of Warsaw, and an M.A. in sociology (2012) from the Institute of Applied Social Sciences, University of Warsaw. Currently Stańczyk works as researcher at Institute of Philosophy and Sociology of the Polish Academy of Sciences. In 2018 his doctoral thesis Macie swoją kulturę: Kultura alternatywna w Polsce 1978–1996 (transl. You Have Your Own Culture: Alternative Culture in Poland 1978–1996) was recognized by The National Centre for Culture Poland as the best Ph.D. in cultural studies in Poland.

== Bibliography ==
- Macie swoją kulturę: Kultura alternatywna w Polsce 1978–1996, Narodowe Centrum Kultury, Warsaw, 2016
- Handluj tym, Lampa i Iskra Boża, Warsaw, 2015
- Skarb piratów, Lampa i Iskra Boża, Warsaw, 2014
