= Stefan Lichański =

Stefan Lichański (Polish pronunciation: [ˈstɛfan liˈxaɲskʲi]; 2 September 1914 in Warsaw - 30 October 1983 in Warsaw) was a Polish literature critic and writer.

During the Second World War he was arrested and imprisoned in the German concentration camp Auschwitz, but survived.

== Works ==
- Literatura i krytyka (1956)
- Kuszenie Hamleta (1965)
- Cienie i profile (1967)
- Wśród mówiących prozą (1971)
- Pisarstwo wsi i ziemi (1983)
- Wladyslaw Stanislaw Reymont (Biblioteka "Polonistyki") (1984)
