= Ludwik Marian Kurnatowski =

Polish crime writer

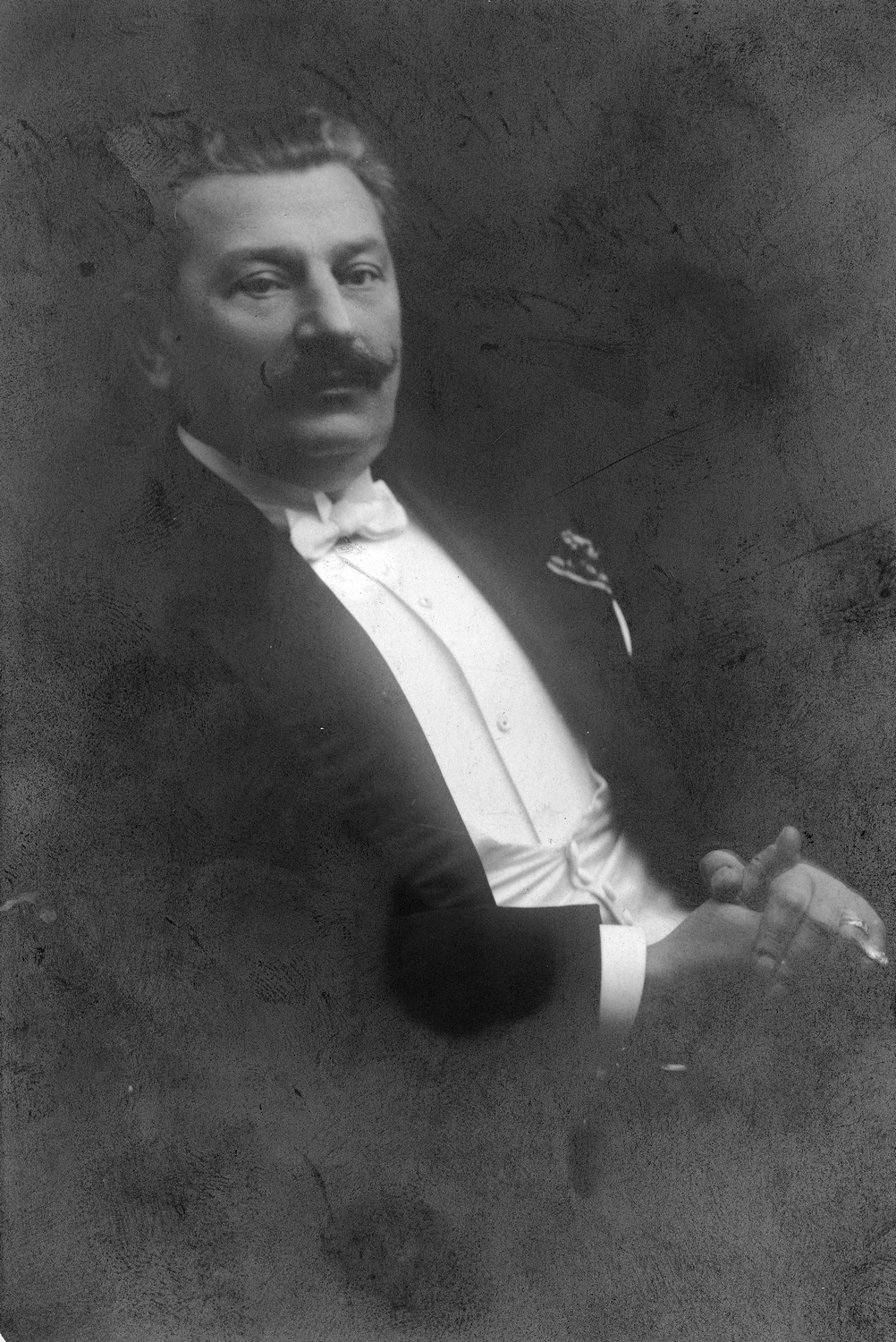

Ludwik Marian Kurnatowski (1868-1940) was a Polish public official and author.

== Publications ==
- Branka cyganów (1931)
- Szpilka z trupią główką (1931; republished 2014)
- Tajemnica Belwederu (1931; republished 2014)
- Obłęd złota (1932)
- Od 1908 do dzisiaj (1932)

== Bibliography ==
- Ludwik M. Kurnatowski [w:] Ludwik M. Kurnatowski, Tajemnica Belwederu (Kryminały przedwojennej Warszawy), Warszawa 2014.
- Jan Zbrożek, Ucieczka komisarza policji, [w:] Stolica, nr 39, 1967
- Głos Polski, 17 I 1928
