= Joanna Wajs =

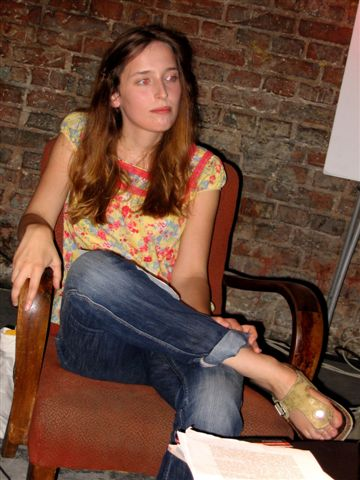
- Joanna Wajs in 2006
- Born: 20 May 1979 (age 47); Warsaw, Poland
- Occupations: writer, literary critic and literary translator

Joanna Wajs (born 20 May 1979) is a Polish writer, literary critic and literary translator.

== Biography ==
Wajs was born on 20 May 1979 in Warsaw, Poland. She studied Polish and Italian philology at the University of Warsaw. Her prose works and poetry have been published in numerous respected literary periodicals in Poland. Her poetry has been translated into several languages, including Italian, Slovenian and Hebrew. Her first collection of poems, entitled Sprzedawcy kieszonkowych lusterek (pocket mirror salesman), was published in 2004 by the publishing house Zielona Sowa in Kraków. This collection won a number of prestigious awards, including the Kazimiera Iłłakowiczówna Prize, which is awarded annually to debut poetry collections by Polish authors. She translates from Italian into Polish, including works by Oriana Fallaci, Dino Buzzati, Gian Antonio Stella and Valerio Evangelisti. She is also the editor of a column on poetry for the daily newspaper Gazeta Wyborcza.
