= Udo Steinke =

German writer (1942–1999)

Udo Steinke (2 May 1942, Łódź – 12 October 1999) was a German writer.

== Professional career ==
The chaos of war led the Steinke family to move to Eilenburg, Saxony, East Germany in 1947 where Mr. Steinke attended the “Bergschule” from 1948 to 1956. He later took up the craft of candy making at the Henze confectionery in Eilenburg. From 1960 to 1965 he studied literature in Leipzig and worked as an editor at the “Leipziger VEB Druck und Verlag” publishing company. In 1968, after a business trip to West Germany, he defected and established his residence in Munich. In addition to various part-time work, Mr. Steinke worked as a journalist and advertising manager at the Goethe-Institut in Munich.

His literary breakthrough came with the short novel “Ich kannte Talmann” (published in 1980). This work gained Mr. Steinke critical acclaim and the Bavarian Prize of Literature. He published six more novels. A frequently recurring theme of his work is the annexation of Germany following World War II, exemplified in his book “Doppeldeutsch”. Udo Steinke was influenced by and enjoyed the company of German luminaries Heinrich Böll, Willy Brandt and Hans-Dietrich Genscher.

Udo Steinke had two children: graphic artist Falk-Ingo Renner (born in 1963) and anatomy professor, Dr. Hanno Steinke (born also in 1963).

The Steinke Institute in Bonn, co-founded by Steinke's widow, is dedicated to his memory and work. The Institute houses the Udo Steinke archive with manuscripts and letters from the author. It also hosts readings and is a school dedicated to teaching languages. The institute offers not only a wide range of German courses for foreign students but also the study of a number of other languages including French, Spanish, English, Russian, Polish, Turkish, Japanese and Chinese.

== Bibliography ==
- Ich kannte Talmann. DTV 1980. ISBN 3-423-06305-X
- Horsky, Leo oder Die Dankbarkeit der Mörder. Ullstein 1982, ISBN 3-550-06474-8
- Die Buggenraths. DTV 1985, ISBN 3-423-06357-2
- Manns Räuschlein. Ullstein 1985, ISBN 3-550-06392-X
- Doppeldeutsch. Schneekluth 1984, ISBN 3-7951-0879-9
