= Maria Julia Zaleska =

Polish writer, prosaist and publicist (1831–1889)

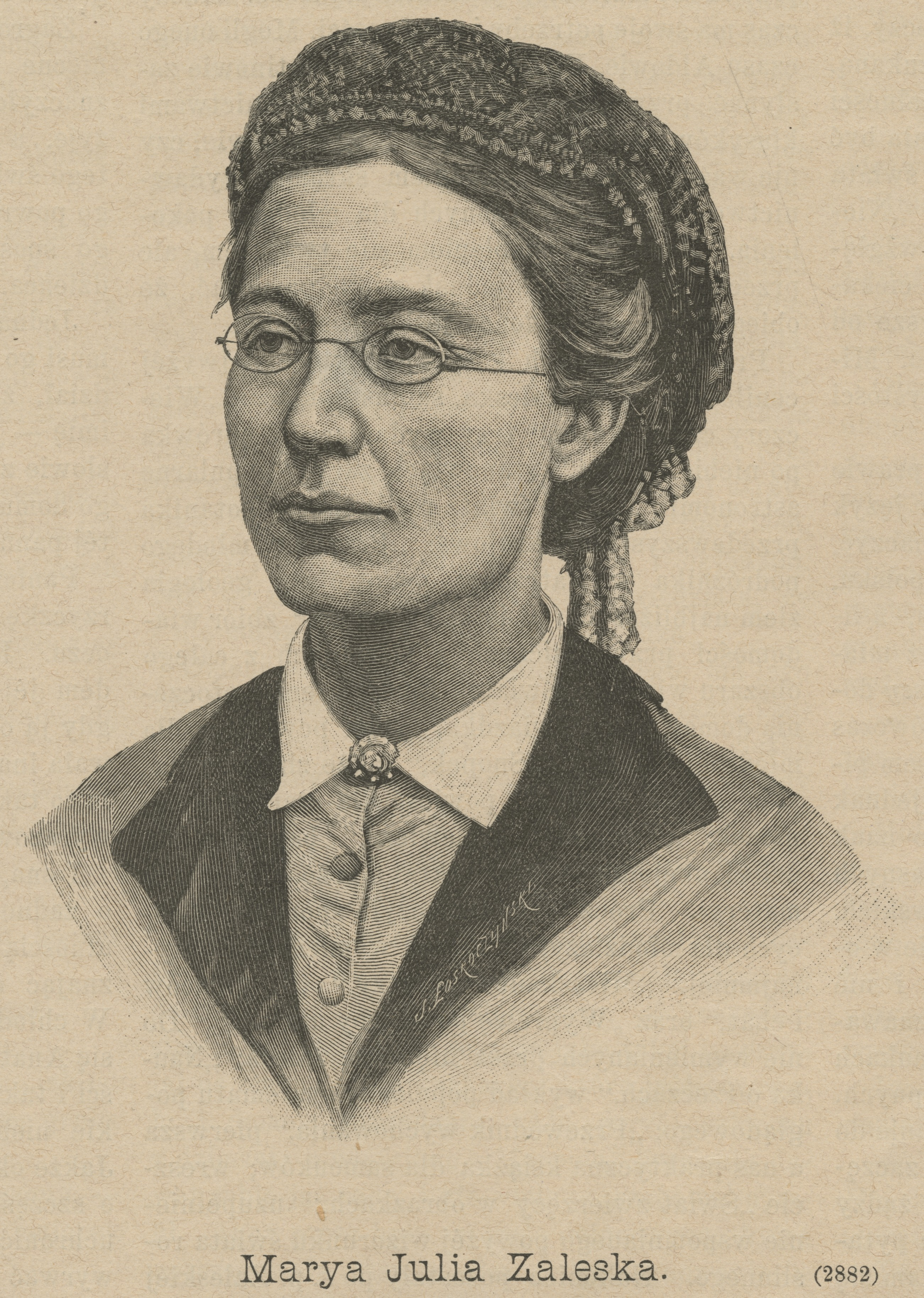
- Born: Maria Julia Perłowska; 1831; Medwedówka, Russian Empire
- Died: April 10, 1889 (aged 57–58); Warsaw, Congress Poland
- Occupations: Writer, prosaist and publicist

Maria Julia Zaleska de domo Perłowska (1831 in Medwedówka near the Chyhyryn – 10 April 1889 in Warsaw) was a Polish writer, prosaist and publicist. She served as the editor of weekly magazine Wieczory Rodzinne [Family evenings] (since 1880).

== Career ==
Zaleska was an author of pioneer and widely read popular science belletristic talks Wieczory czwartkowe [Thursday evenings] (1871), Wędrówki po niebie i ziemi [Wander through the sky and the ground] (1873), Obraz świata roślinnego [Scene of a plant world] (1875), Przygody młodego podróżnika w Tatrach [Adventures of the young traveller in Tatra Mountains] (1882). She was also an author of science-fiction novel Niezgodni królewicze [Dissident princes] (1889), adaptations Młody wygnaniec [Young exile] (based on themes of James Fenimore Cooper works; 1889) and Mieszkaniec puszczy [Wildernessian] (based on themes of Richard Roth works; 1894).
