= Aleksander Wat =

Polish poet, writer, art theoretician, memoirist

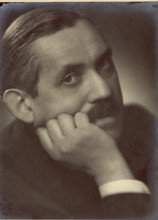
- Portrait of Aleksander Wat before 1967
- Born: Aleksander Chwat; 1 May 1900; Warsaw, Congress Poland, Russian Empire
- Died: 29 July 1967 (aged 67); Antony, France

Aleksander Wat was the pen name of Aleksander Chwat (1 May 1900 – 29 July 1967), a Polish poet, writer, art theoretician, and memoirist. He was one of the precursors of the Polish futurism movement in the early 1920s and is considered one of the most important Polish writers of the mid-20th century. In 1959, he emigrated to France and in 1963 relocated to the United States, where he worked at the Center for Slavic and East European Studies of the University of California, Berkeley.

== Life ==
Aleksander Chwat was born on 1 May 1900 in Warsaw, at that time under Russian rule, into a well-established and prosperous Jewish family. His father, Bronisław, was an observant Jew whose first language was Yiddish. He allowed his children a liberal education. His family had interests in Polish literature and drama and one of his sisters, Seweryna Broniszówna (13 July 1891 – 28 June 1982), was an actress.

After a brief service with the Polish Army he graduated from the Faculty of Philology of the Warsaw University, where he studied philosophy, psychology and logic. In 1919, he was among the young poets to proclaim the advent of new, futuristic poetry. The following year he published his first collection of poems titled JA z jednej strony i Ja z drugiej strony mopsożelaznego piecyka (Pug Iron Stove; literally: I at Either Side of the Pug Iron Stove), which gained much popularity among the supporters of the new trends in literature of the epoch. In 1927, he followed up with a volume of short stories, Lucifer Unemployed (Bezrobotny Lucyfer in Polish). Until 1922, he was one of the creators of the influential monthly magazine Nowa Sztuka (New Art; appeared 1921-22), followed by Almanachy Nowej Sztuki (New Art Almanach) and "the increasingly rabid Communist periodical" Miesięcznik literacki (The Literary Monthly). He contributed to the dissemination of the work of Vladimir Mayakovsky and of Futurism in general across Poland, before becoming a supporter of communism.

Until 1931 he was a main contributor to the Marxist Tygodnik literacki (Literary Weekly). Between 1933 and the outbreak of World War II in 1939 he was also the literary director of Gebethner & Wolff, the biggest and the most renowned Polish printing house of the time.

=== War years ===
After the Nazi invasion of Poland in 1939 he moved to Lwów, then under Soviet occupation. Although he was sympathetic for Communism, the Communist Party regarded him only a "progressive" "fellow-traveller". One of his discussed faults, however, was his friendship with Andrzej Stawar, one of the authors for Miesięcznik literacki and the former member of the Communist Party of Poland who ran anti-Stalinist newspapers in the 1930s. Wat was arrested by the NKVD in 1940. He was held in detention successively at the former Zamarstinov military prison in Lwów, then in Kyiv, at the NKVD's Lubyanka prison in Moscow, and finally at Saratov.

Freed from prison in November 1941 under the terms of the general amnesty for Poles prompted by the Nazi invasion of the Soviet Union, he was exiled to Kazakhstan, with his wife Paulina, also known as Ola Watowa (26 April 1903 – 9 February 1991), and their 9-year-old son, Andrzej. During the war, his oldest brother, Aron, perished with his wife and two children, probably at Treblinka.

=== In communist Poland ===
In 1946, Wat was allowed to return to Poland during Polish population transfers (1944–46), along with most Polish nationals expelled from the Territories of Poland annexed by the Soviet Union. He was appointed chief-editor of the State Publishing Institute (PIW). However, he "turned away from Communism after his imprisonment by the Soviet secret police and became a vociferous spokesman for democracy." Considered unreliable by the Soviet-sponsored Communist authorities in Poland, he was removed from his position and not allowed to publish his own works. He devoted much of his time to translating of several classical pieces of English, French, German and Russian literature to Polish.

In 1953, Wat suffered a stroke, marking the beginning of an incurable psychosomatic condition, which from then on caused him acute physical pain and a state of oppressive anxiety.

In the wake of the political thaw induced by Nikita Khrushchev's process of de-Stalinisation, Wat returned to public life in 1957.

=== Emigration ===
In 1959, he emigrated to France and settled in Paris. In 1963, he received an invitation to teach Slavic Literatures at the Center for Slavic and East European Studies of the University of California, Berkeley. From the beginning of 1964 until June 1965, Wat worked at Berkeley. There he recorded a series of discussions with Czesław Miłosz about his life, which he considered a kind of "spoken diary", published posthumously under the title "My Century".

Wat committed suicide on 29 July 1967 at his home in Antony, France. The disease of which he had suffered for fourteen years is usually quoted as the cause of his final act, but biographer Tomas Venclova sees the wave of East European anti-Semitism that followed the Six-Day War as the triggering cause. During his youth, Wat had long considered ending his life before reaching the age of twenty-five, which he saw as the last moment before the onset of inevitable mental ossification.

== World views ==
Wat had a deeply conflicted religious identity: the son of a Jewish scholar, he developed an atheistic worldview as a young boy due to his extensive reading, but converted to Catholicism during his time in Soviet prisons. His last wish was to be buried in a Christian cemetery in Israel.

Portions of Wat's literary archive, including the audio recordings of interviews with Czesław Miłosz that were edited into Moj Wiek (translated into English by Richard Lourie as My Century), are held at the Beinecke Rare Book and Manuscript Library, Yale University.

== Work ==
- 1927. Bezrobotny Lucyfer. Hoesick, Warsaw, Poland.
- 1957. Wiersze. Wydawnictwo Literackie, Kraków, Poland.
- 1977. Moj Wiek: Pamiętnik Mówiony, Polonia Publishing. London, UK.
- 1977. Mediterranean Poems (edited and translated by Czesław Miłosz. Ardis Publishing. Ann Arbor, Michigan.
- 1988. My Century: The odyssey of a Polish intellectual (edited and translated by Richard Lourie). University of California Press, Berkeley, California.
- 1989. With the skin: Poems of Aleksander Wat. Translated and edited by Czesław Miłosz and Leonard Nathan. Ecco Press, New York, NY.
- 1990. Lucifer Unemployed (translated by Lillian Vallee), Northwestern University Press, Evanston, Illinois.

== See also ==
- Bruno Jasieński
