= Anna Zahorska =

Polish poet (1882–1942)

Anna Zahorska de domo Elzenberg (1882 in Byszlaki – 1942 in Auschwitz concentration camp), pseudonym Savitri, was a Polish poet, prosaist, and dramatist. A graduate of Polish philology at the Jagiellonian University and Russian philology at the University of Warsaw, Zahorska went on to become an activist of Polish Socialist Party.

Zahorska was an author of lyric poetry and patriotic and social-revolutionary poems. Works included: Pieśni walki (1908), Poezje (1908), Dniom zmartwychwstania (1914), novels Utopia, Trucizny (1928), dramas Pani słoneczna (1912), Bezrobocie (1927), collection of stories Księga milczenia (1927), hagiographic works.
