= Indiana (disambiguation) =

Indiana is a state in the United States of America.

Indiana may also refer to:

== Places ==
=== United States ===
- Indiana Territory, a frontier territory in the early 19th century
- Indiana County, Pennsylvania
  - Indiana, Pennsylvania, a borough in the county
- Indiana Township, Allegheny County, Pennsylvania, a township

=== Elsewhere ===
- Indiana, São Paulo, municipality in Brazil
- Indiana, Ontario, Canada
- Indiana District, Maynas, Peru
- 1602 Indiana, an asteroid

== Schools ==
- Indiana University, a multi-campus public university system in Indiana, comprising the following:
  - Six campuses operated solely by this system:
    - Indiana University Bloomington
    - Indiana University East
    - Indiana University Kokomo
    - Indiana University Northwest
    - Indiana University South Bend
    - Indiana University Southeast
  - Three campuses operated in cooperation with another major public university, Purdue University:
    - Indiana University – Purdue University Columbus (administered by IU)
    - Indiana University – Purdue University Fort Wayne (administered by Purdue)
    - Indiana University – Purdue University Indianapolis (administered by IU)
- Indiana Hoosiers, the athletic program of Indiana University Bloomington
- Indiana University Press, the publishing house of Indiana University
- Indiana State University
- Indiana State Sycamores, the athletic program of Indiana State University
- Indiana University of Pennsylvania
- Indiana Area School District

== People and characters ==
=== People ===
- Indiana Evans (born 1990), an Australian Home and Away actress
- Indiana (singer) (born 1987), English electronic singer-songwriter
- Indiana Massara (born 2002), Australian actress, singer, and Internet personality
- Indiana "Indy" Neidell (born 1967), American-Swedish actor and YouTube personality
- Indiana Woodward (born 1993 or 1994), French ballet dancer
- Robert Indiana (1928–2018), an American artist

=== Fictional characters ===
- Indiana Jones (character), a fictional archaeologist

== Animals ==
- Indiana (genus), a genus of Bradoriida
- Indiana (horse)

=== Fictional animals ===
- Indiana Jones (fictional dog), the Jones family dog; see Indiana Jones (character)

== Naval ships ==
- Indiana-class battleship, a class of three late 19th-century United States battleships
- USS Indiana, individual battleships which have borne the name

== Transport ==
- List of ships named after Indiana
- SS Indiana, merchant and passenger ships which have borne the name
- Indiana station (CTA), a station on the Chicago Transit Authority's 'L' system
- Indiana station (Los Angeles Metro), an at-grade light rail station in the Los Angeles County Metro Rail system
- Grumett Indiana, an automobile based on the Vauxhall Viva

== Music ==
- Indiana (Jon McLaughlin album),
- Indiana (David Mead album), 2004
- "Indiana" (song), a 2015 song by Sarsa
- "Back Home Again in Indiana" or "(Back Home Again in) Indiana", written by James F. Hanley
- "Indiana", a 2013 song by Tom Aspaul
- "Indiana", a song by Spanish rock band Hombres G

== Other ==
- Indiana (statue), a public artwork by Retta T. Matthews
- Indiana (novel), an 1831 novel by George Sand
- Indiana Pacers, an NBA team
- Project Indiana, OpenSolaris project
- Index Indiana, a publication of the Central Reference Library of India

== See also ==
- Indian (disambiguation)
- India (disambiguation)
- Indiana Jones (disambiguation)
