= ISNS =

ISNS may refer to:

== Schools ==
- International School of Nanshan Shenzhen (ISNS; Chinese: 深圳市南山外籍人员子女学校, lit. 'Shenzhen Nanshan Foreign Personnel Children’s School'), Nanshan, Shenzhen, China; accredited by the New Brunswick Department of Education in Canada
- Indiana State Normal School (ISNS), former name of the Indiana State University (ISU), in, Terre-Haute, Indiana, USA

== Groups, organizations ==
- International Society for Neoplatonic Studies (ISNS), a learned society established in 1973
- Israel Nuclear Society (IsNS), a member of the International Nuclear Societies Council

== Other uses ==
- Internet Storage Name Service (iSNS), a protocol allows automated management of iSCSI and iFCP over TCP/IP, emulating a SAN

== See also ==
- Indiana State Normal School (disambiguation) (ISNS)
- ISN (disambiguation) for the singular of ISNs
