= ISN =

The initials ISN can stand for:

- Bureau of International Security and Nonproliferation, in the U.S. Department of State
- Intel Software Network
- International Relations and Security Network
- International Socialist Network
- International Society for Neurochemistry
- International Society of Nephrology
- Irish Socialist Network
- Israel Start-Up Nation
- ITAD Subscriber Numbers for VoIP PBX
- Nicaraguan Sign Language (Spanish: Idioma de Señas de Nicaragua)
- Sloulin Field International Airport, a defunct airport in North Dakota with the IATA code "ISN"

== See also ==
- International Standard Number (disambiguation)
