= Jean-Pol Dubois =

French actor (1950 or 1951 – 2025)

Dubois

Jean-Pol Dubois (29 May 1940 – 24 July 2025) was a French actor.

== Life and career ==
Dubois began acting in the 1970s, being credited in a number of television and film roles, including A Captain's Honor, Vidocq and Fanfan la Tulipe.

Dubois died on 24 July 2025, at the age of 74.

== Selected filmography ==
- A Captain's Honor (1982) as Mr. Dubois
- Target (1985) as Glasses
- Life and Nothing But (1989) as André
- Louis, the Child King (1993)
- The Cost of Living (2003) as Brett
- Before I Forget (2007) as L'homme
- The Princess of Montpensier (2010) as Charles, Cardinal of Lorraine
- If You Saw His Heart (2017)
