= Zapomnij mi (song) =

Single by Sarsa

from the album Zapomnij mi
- Released: 7 December 2015; 5 February 2016 (remix)
- Genre: Indie pop
- Length: 3:37
- Label: Universal Music Polska
- Songwriter: Marta Markiewicz
- Producers: Markiewicz; Tomasz Konfederak

Sarsa singles chronology
"Indiana" (2015)	"Zapomnij mi" (2015)	"Feel No Fear" (2016)

"Zapomnij mi" (English: Forgive me) is a single by Polish singer Sarsa. The song was released as the third single from her debut studio album Zapomnij mi on 7 December 2015, and was written by Sarsa with production by Sarsa along with Tomasz Konfederak.

The single reached number 1 on the Polish Airplay – New Chart and was a top ten hit on the Polish Airplay chart. An official remix of the song featuring Polish DJ Tom Swoon was released on 5 February 2016.

== Music video ==
A music video to accompany the release of "Zapomnij mi" was released on 26 November 2015 through Sarsa's Vevo channel. It was directed by Alan Kępski.

== Track listing ==
Digital download
No.	Title	Length
1.	"Zapomnij mi"	3:37

== Charts and certifications ==
=== Weekly charts ===
Chart (2015)	Peak position
Poland (Polish Airplay Top 20)	6
Poland (Polish Airplay – New)	1

=== Certifications ===
Region	Certification	Certified units/sales
Poland (ZPAV)	Platinum	20,000^{‡}
^{‡} Sales+streaming figures based on certification alone.

== Release history ==
Region	Date	Format	Label
Poland	7 December 2015	Digital download	Universal Music Polska
