= Indiana State Normal School =

Indiana State Normal School may refer to former names of:

- Indiana State University, Terre Haute, Indiana, US; using the name from 1865 to 1929
- Indiana University of Pennsylvania, Indiana, Pennsylvania, US; using the name from 1920 to 1927

== See also ==
- Indiana (disambiguation)
- Northern Indiana Normal School, Valparaiso, Indiana, US
