= Justyna Janik =

Justine
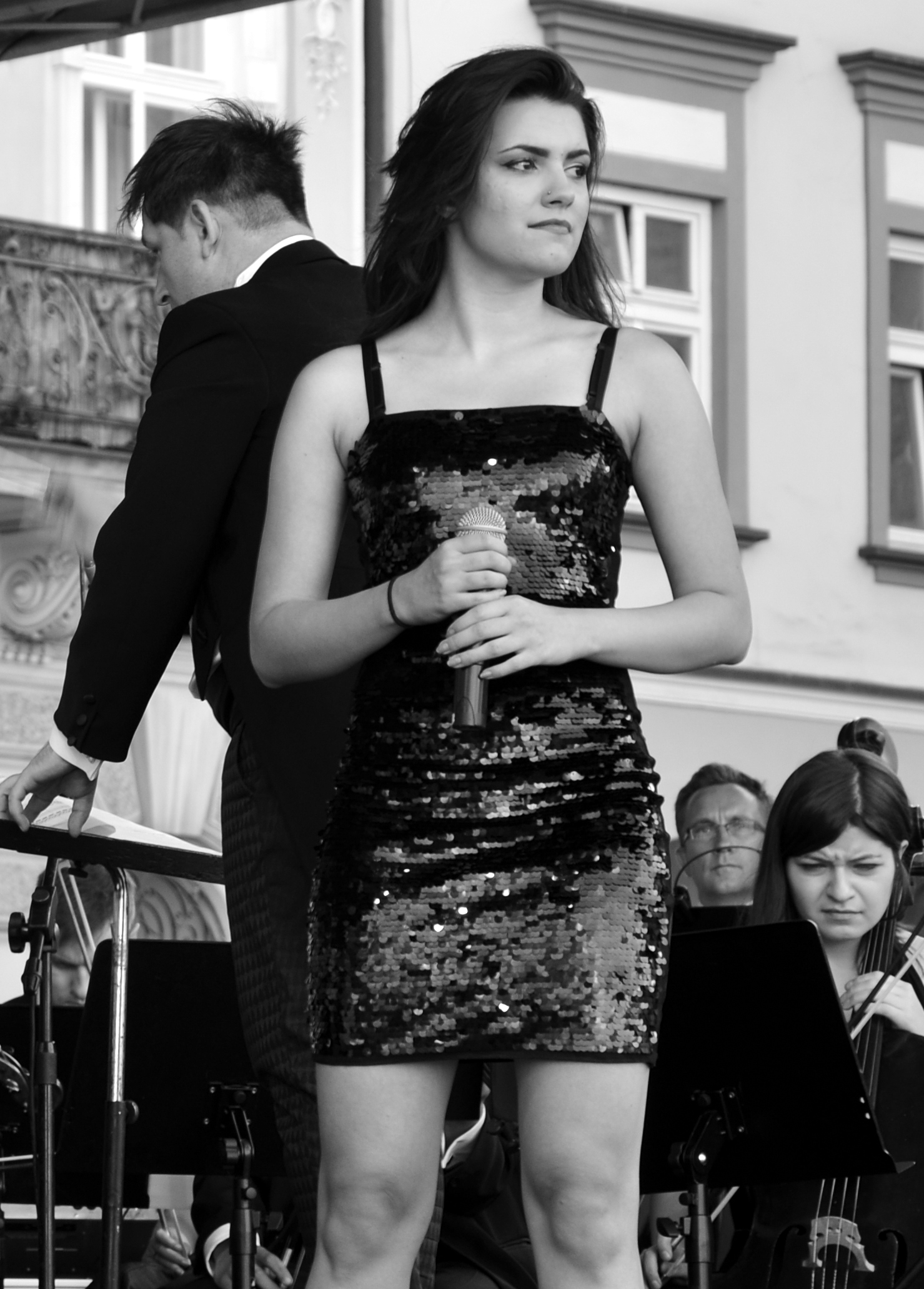

Background information
- Born: Justyna Joanna Janik; 3 November 1992 (age 33); Żywiec, Poland
- Occupations: singer; songwriter
- Instruments: violin; piano
- Website: justynajanik.com/en

Justyna Joanna Janik known professionally as Justine, (born November 3, 1992, in Poland), is a singer and songwriter. She was a semifinalist of The Voice of Poland (season 5) as a member of Team Tomson & Baron. In the show, she sang such songs as “Mamma Knows Best” by Jessie J, “Why Don’t You Love Me” by Beyonce, and “Hurt” by Christina Aguilera. In 2015 she released her first single "Run After Me". With this song she reached the final of the International Songwriting Competition. There had been over 18,000 entries from 120 countries. Justine's song “Run After Me” was judged by Tom Waits, Ke$ha, Lorde, Avicii, Pat Metheny, Bill Whiters, Boyz II Men and more. Finally, the song occurred among the top 16 songs in a Pop category with an Honorable Mention. Soon after this, she won the 2nd place in the Unsigned Only Music Competition 2016, Pop/Top40 category. There had been about 6000 entries from over 100 countries.
