= Bronię się =

Single by Sarsa

from the album Pióropusze
- Released: 10 March 2017
- Genre: Electropop
- Length: 3:06:00
- Label: Universal Music Polska
- Songwriter: Marta Markiewicz
- Producers: Markiewicz; Steve Manovski

Sarsa singles chronology
"Dzielę" (2016)	"Bronię się" (2017)	"Volta" (2017)

"Bronię się" (English: I'm defending myself) is a song by Polish singer Sarsa, and the lead single off of her second studio album Pióropusze. The song was released in Poland as a digital download on 10 March 2017, through Universal Music Polska. It was written by Sarsa Markiewicz, and produced by Markiewicz along with Steve Manovski.

After its release, the song reached number-three on the Polish Airplay – New Chart, and number-26 on the Polish Airplay chart.

== Music video ==
A music video to accompany the release of "Bronię się" was released on 9 March 2017 through Sarsa's Vevo channel. It was directed by Marcin Starzecki.

== Track listing ==
Digital download
No.	Title	Length
1.	"Bronię się"	3:06

== Charts and certifications ==
=== Weekly charts ===
Chart (2017)	Peak position
Poland (Polish Airplay Top 100)	26
Poland (Polish Airplay – New)	3

=== Certifications ===
Region	Certification	Certified units/sales
Poland (ZPAV)	Gold	10,000^{‡}
^{‡} Sales+streaming figures based on certification alone.

== Release history ==
Region	Date	Format	Label
Poland	10 March 2017	Digital download	Universal Music Polska
