= The Voice of Poland season 1 =

The Voice of Poland
- Season 1
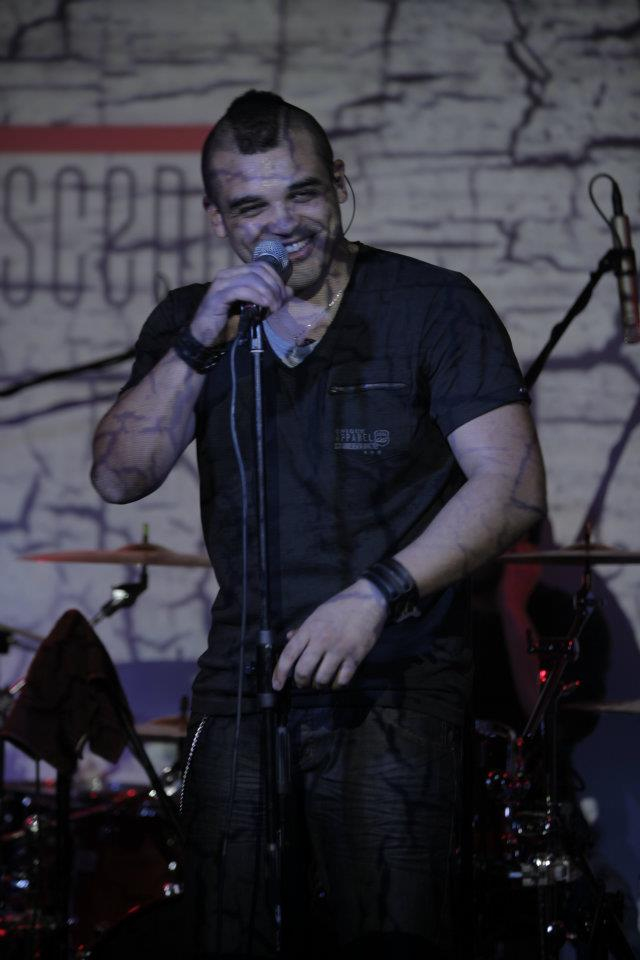
- Hosted by: Hubert Urbański; Magdalena Mielcarz; Mateusz Szymkowiak (V Reporter)
- Judges: Andrzej Piaseczny; Kayah; Nergal; Ania Dąbrowska
- Winner: Damian Ukeje
- Runner-up: Antoni Smykiewicz

Release
- Original network: TVP2
- Original release: September 3 – December 10, 2011

Season chronology
- Next → Season 2

The first season of The Voice of Poland began airing 3 September 2011 on TVP 2. Based on the reality singing competition The Voice of Holland, the series was created by Dutch television producer John de Mol. It is part of an international series. The series was won by Damian Ukeje, he was coached by judge Nergal.

This is the only season to feature Kayah, Nergal and Ania Dąbrowska as coaches; they were replaced by Tomson & Baron, Marek Piekarczyk, Justyna Steczkowska and Patrycja Markowska. While Andrzej Piaseczny returned between season six and eight.

== Coaches and Hosts ==
The Voice of Poland began airing 3 September 2011 on TVP 2. The judges were Andrzej Piaseczny, Kayah, Nergal and Ania Dąbrowska. Hubert Urbański and Magdalena Mielcarz hosted the show with Mateusz Szymkowiak as V-Reporter.

Coaches and Hosts gallery

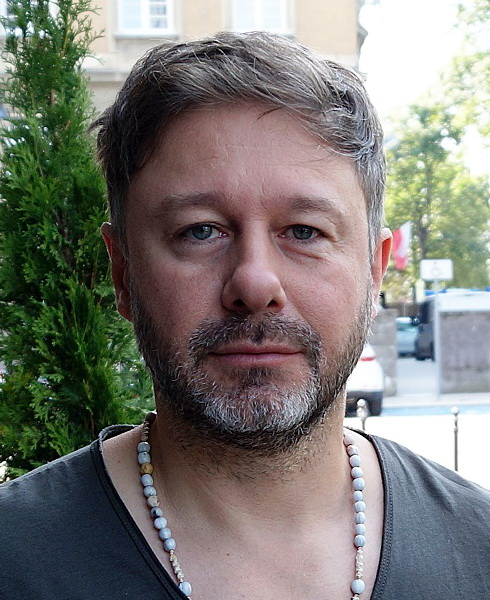
Andrzej Piaseczny

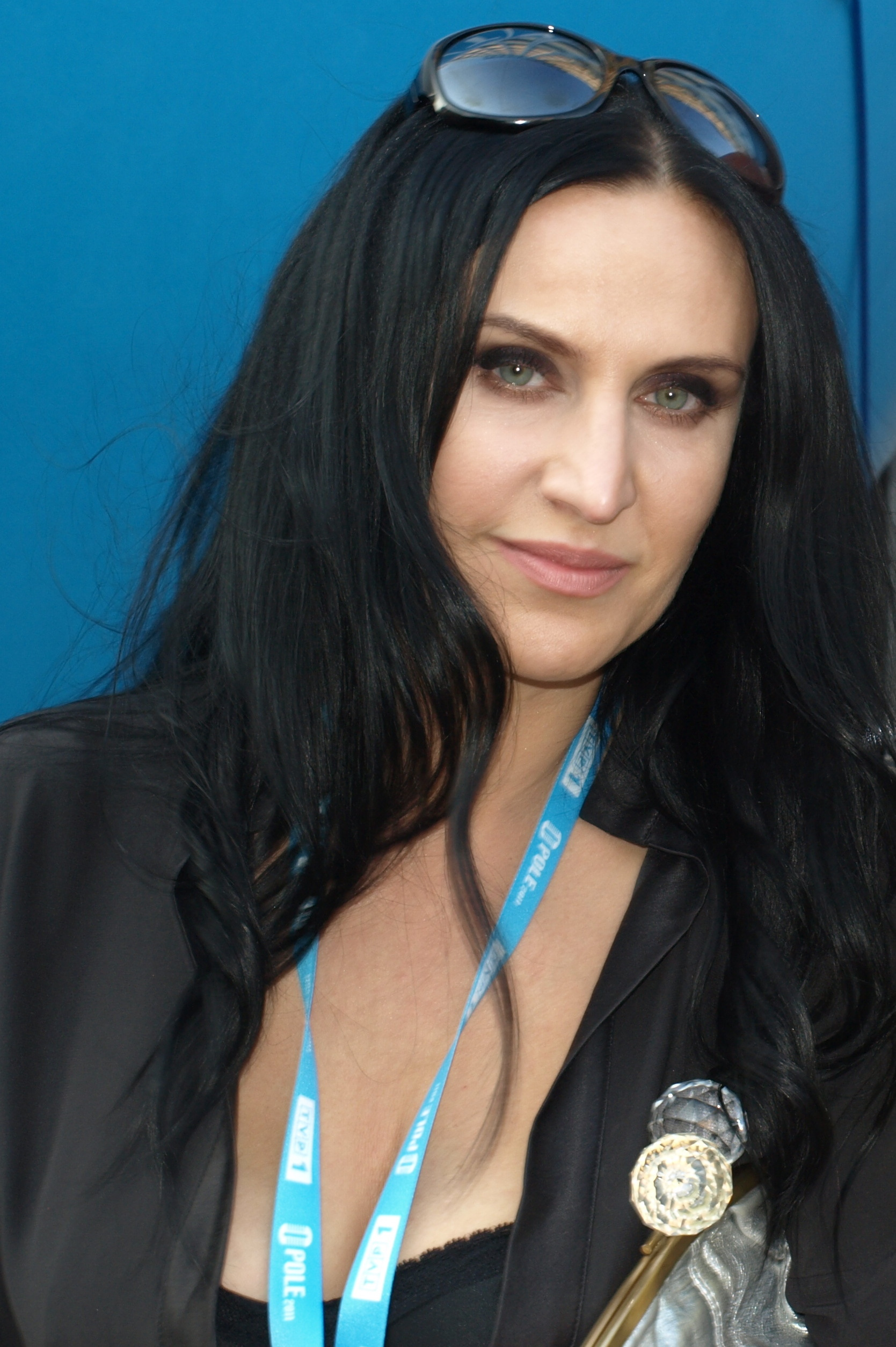
Kayah

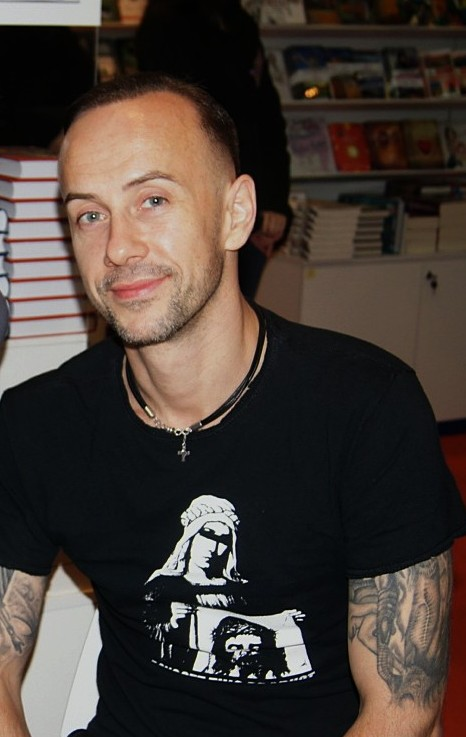
Nergal

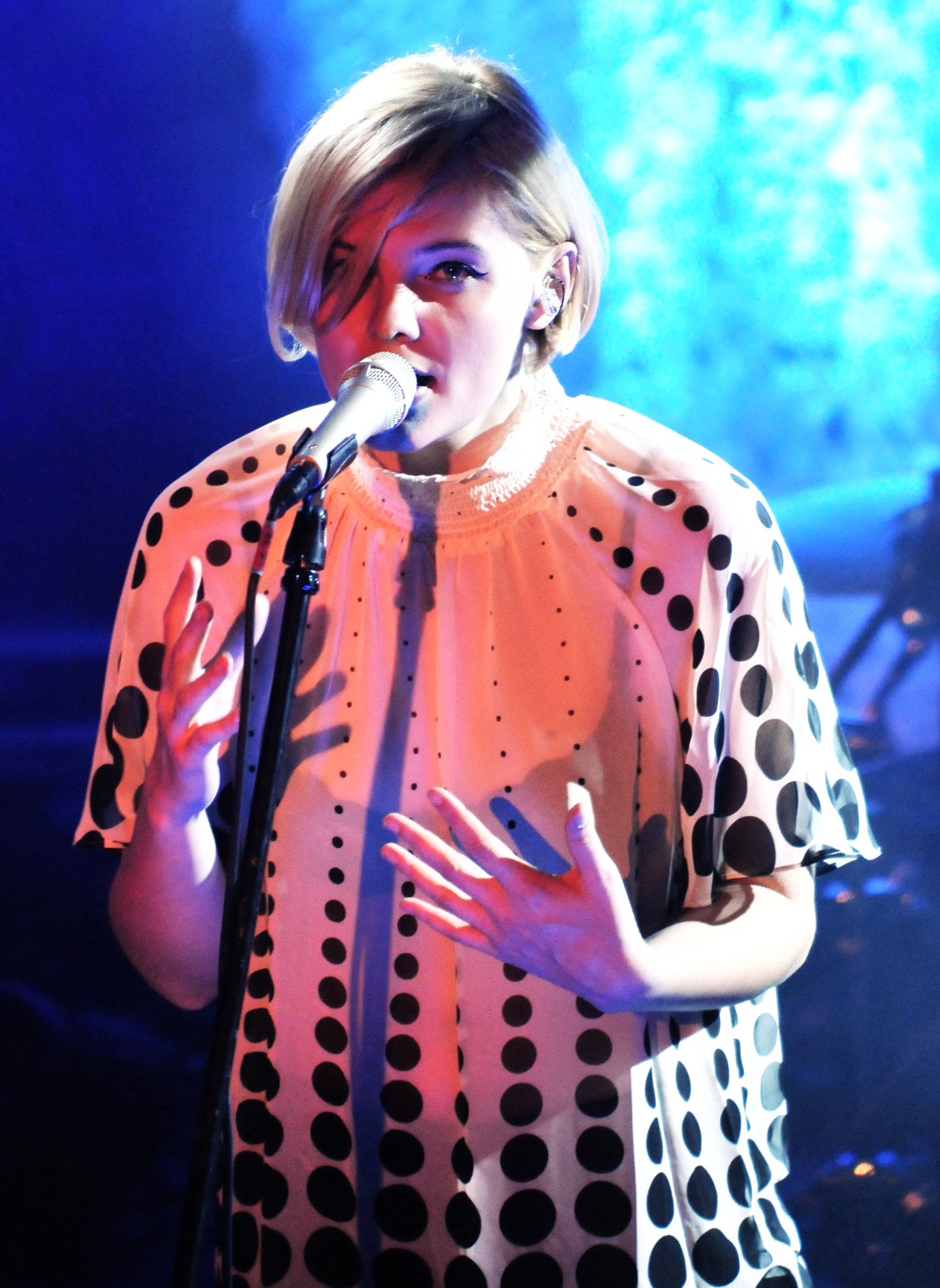
Ania Dąbrowska

Hubert Urbański

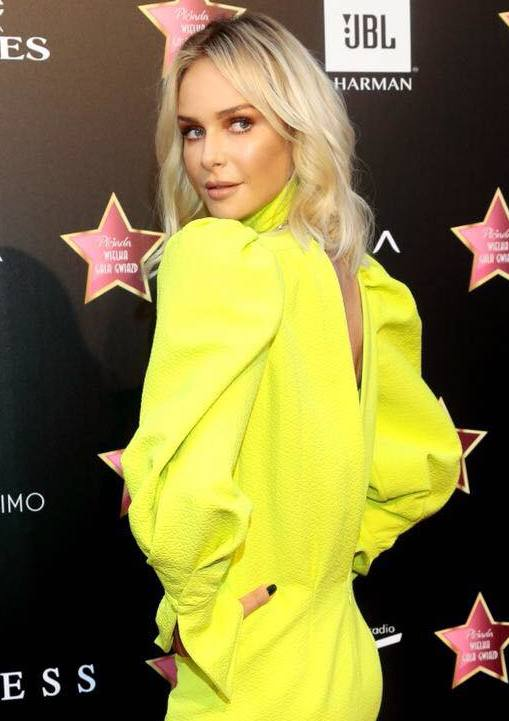
Magdalena Mielcarz

== Teams ==
Color key

- Winner
- Runner-up
- Third place
- Fourth place
- Eliminated in the Semifinals
- Eliminated in the Quarterfinals
- Eliminated in the Live rounds
- Eliminated in the Sing-off round
- Eliminated in the Battle rounds

Coaches	Top 48 artists					
Andrzej Piaseczny						
Andrzej Piaseczny	Antoni Smykiewicz	Rafał Brzozowski	Katarzyna Lisowska	Ian Rooth	Ewa Kłosowicz	Krzysztof Kubiś
Andrzej Piaseczny	Michalina Malinowska	Rafał Szatan	Martyna Ciok	Anna Sokołek	Natalia Skalska	Bartłomiej Grzanek
Kayah						
Kayah	Mateusz Krautwurst	Filip Moniuszko	Edyta Strzycka	Kaja Domińska	Maciej Moszyński	Mirosław Witkowski
Kayah	Milena Masłowska	Karolina Leszko	Marcin Koczot	Marta Florek	Mariusz Kozak	Małgorzata Kuś
Nergal						
Nergal	Damian Ukeje	Monika Urlik	Ewelina Kordy	Ares Chadzinikolau	Filip Sałapa	Gabriel Fleszar
Nergal	Katarzyna Grabowska	Joanna Makaruk	Aleksandra Kasprzyk	Adam Miroszczuk	Marta Michalska-Uras	Anna Galstyan
Ania Dąbrowska						
Ania Dąbrowska	Piotr Niesłuchowski	Aleksandra Galewska	Karolina Charko	Ewa Szlachcic	Katarzyna Klimczyk	Aleksandra Pieczara
Ania Dąbrowska	Dominika Skowron	Katarzyna Kubik	Katarzyna Jaźnicka	Patrycja Kawęcka	Jakub Foltak	Marta Maliszewska

== Blind Auditions ==
Color keys

✔	Coach hit his/her "I WANT YOU" button
	Artist defaulted to this coach's team
	Artist elected to join this coach's team
	Artist eliminated with no coach pressing his or her "I WANT YOU" button

=== Episode 1 (September 3, 2011) ===
Order	Artist	Age	Hometown	Song	Coach's and contestant's choices			
Order	Artist	Age	Hometown	Song	Andrzej	Kayah	Nergal	Ania
1	Piotr Niesłuchowski	23	Ciechanów	"Sex on Fire"	—	✔	✔	✔
2	Małgorzata Kuś	28	Kamieniec Ząbkowicki	"Tell Me 'bout It"	✔	✔	—	—
3	Kaja Mianowana	21	Lublin	"A Night Like This"	—	—	—	—
4	Antoni Smykiewicz	24	Warsaw	"Use Somebody"	✔	—	✔	—
5	Sonia Wąsowska	18	N/A	"Love Is a Losing Game"	—	—	—	—
6	Monika Urlik	28	Warsaw	"I Say a Little Prayer"	✔	✔	✔	✔

=== Episode 2 (September 3, 2011) ===
Order	Artist	Age	Hometown	Song	Coach's and contestant's choices			
Order	Artist	Age	Hometown	Song	Andrzej	Kayah	Nergal	Ania
1	Marta Florek	24	Limanowa	"Testosteron"	✔	✔	—	✔
2	Ian Rooth	20	Owczary	"American Boy"	✔	—	—	—
3	Ewa Kłosowicz	20	Częstochowa	"California King Bed"	✔	—	—	✔
4	Gabriel Fleszar	31	Złotoryja	"The Lazy Song"	—	—	✔	—
5	Sylwia Gawłowska	23	N/A	"Skłamałam"	—	—	—	—
6	Karolina Charko	20	Lublin	"Make You Feel My Love"	✔	✔	—	✔
7	Mirosław Witkowski	32	Nowy Sącz	"This Ain't Gonna Work"	—	✔	✔	✔

=== Episode 3 (September 10, 2011) ===
Order	Artist	Age	Hometown	Song	Coach's and contestant's choices			
Order	Artist	Age	Hometown	Song	Andrzej	Kayah	Nergal	Ania
1	Katarzyna Lisowska	27	Opoczno	"Only Girl (In the World)"	✔	✔	✔	✔
2	Aleksandra Pieczara	26	Kraków	"Left Outside Alone"	—	✔	—	✔
3	Katarzyna Osowska	24	N/A	"When Love Takes Over"	—	—	—	—
4	Mateusz Krautwurst	25	Zielona Góra	"You Give Me Something"	✔	✔	✔ ^{1}	✔
5	Sebastian Plewiński	23	Legnica	"Wonderful Life"	—	—	—	—
6	Aleksandra Galewska	25	N/A	"Sweet About Me"	—	—	✔	✔
7	Filip Sałapa	27	Bielsko-Biała	"Alive"	✔	✔	✔	✔

^1 Kayah pressed Nergal's button.

=== Episode 4 (September 10, 2011) ===
Order	Artist	Age	Hometown	Song	Coach's and contestant's choices			
Order	Artist	Age	Hometown	Song	Andrzej	Kayah	Nergal	Ania
1	Katarzyna Grabowska	29	Jelenia Góra	"American Boy"	—	—	✔	✔
2	Milena Masłowska	26	N/A	"Mercy"	✔	✔	✔	✔
3	Katarzyna Kubik	29	Białystok	"Sober"	—	—	✔	✔
4	Filip Moniuszko	23	Konin	"You Give Me Something"	✔	✔	—	—
5	Mateusz Rychlewski	24	Konin	"How You Remind Me"	—	—	—	—
6	Jakub Foltak	17	Bestwina	"Bad Day"	—	—	—	✔
7	Rafał Brzozowski	30	Nowy Dwór Mazowiecki	"Everything"	✔	—	✔	—

=== Episode 5 (September 17, 2011) ===
Order	Artist	Age	Hometown	Song	Coach's and contestant's choices			
Order	Artist	Age	Hometown	Song	Andrzej	Kayah	Nergal	Ania
1	Rafał Szatan	24	Lublin	"For Once in My Life"	✔	—	✔	—
2	Aleksandra Kasprzyk	28	Siemianowice Śląskie	"Sweet Child o' Mine"	—	—	—	—
3	Dominika Skowron	24	Częstochowa	"Price Tag"	—	—	—	✔
4	Anna Rossa	28	Katowice	"Tell Me 'bout It"	—	—	—	—
5	Ewelina Kordy	35	Barlinek	"Empire State of Mind"	—	✔	✔	—
6	Przemysław Smolarski	34	N/A	"Śniadanie do łóżka"	—	—	—	—
7	Kaja Domińska	19	N/A	"Love Is a Losing Game"	✔	✔	—	✔

=== Episode 6 (September 17, 2011) ===
Order	Artist	Age	Hometown	Song	Coach's and contestant's choices			
Order	Artist	Age	Hometown	Song	Andrzej	Kayah	Nergal	Ania
1	Natalia Skalska	25	Warsaw	"Only Girl (In the World)"	✔	—	—	—
2	Marta Maliszewska	28	Lublin	"Rolling in the Deep"	—	—	—	✔
3	Adam Miroszczuk	34	N/A	"Ain't No Sunshine"	—	—	✔	—
4	Piotr Lato	31	Warsaw	"Alive"	—	—	—	—
5	Karolina Leszko	25	Kraków	"Bleeding Love"	✔	✔	—	✔
6	Marcin Koczot	32	Pyskowice	"Whataya Want from Me"	—	✔	—	✔
7	Ares Chadzinikolau	38	Poznań	"You Are the Sunshine of My Life"	—	—	✔	—

=== Episode 7 (September 24, 2011) ===
Order	Artist	Age	Hometown	Song	Coach's and contestant's choices			
Order	Artist	Age	Hometown	Song	Andrzej	Kayah	Nergal	Ania
1	Damian Ukeje	25	Szczecin	"Use Somebody"	✔	✔	✔	—
2	Magdalena Borowiecka	19	Szczecin	"Price Tag"	—	—	—	—
3	Anna Sokołek	25	Lublin	"Trudno kochać"	✔	—	—	—
4	Cezary Makiewicz & Zbigniew Hofman	N/A	N/A	"Love You More"	—	—	—	—
5	Mariusz Kozak	40	N/A	"I'm Yours"	—	✔	—	—
6	Małgorzata Żurańska-Wilkowska	30	N/A	"Whataya Want from Me"	—	—	—	—
7	Ewa Szlachcic	28	Białystok	"Need You Now"	—	—	✔	✔

=== Episode 8 (September 24, 2011) ===
Order	Artist	Age	Hometown	Song	Coach's and contestant's choices			
Order	Artist	Age	Hometown	Song	Andrzej	Kayah	Nergal	Ania
1	Marta Michalska-Uras	21	Jelenia Góra	"Lucky"	✔	—	✔	—
2	Ewa Cybulska	57	Warsaw	"Rolling in the Deep"	—	—	—	—
3	Katarzyna Klimczyk	25	Radomsko	"Lost"	—	✔	—	✔
4	Martyna Ciok	21	Ostrołęka	"Za późno"	✔	—	—	—
5	Kamil Krupicz	22	Warsaw	"Beggin'"	—	—	—	—
6	Joanna Makaruk	29	Toruń	"Mercy"	—	—	✔	—
7	Patrycja Kawęcka	27	Radom	"Paparazzi"	—	—	—	—
8	Bartłomiej Grzanek	35	Aleksandrów Łódzki	"Daughters"	✔	—	—	—

=== Episode 9 (October 1, 2011) ===
Order	Artist	Age	Hometown	Song	Coach's and contestant's choices			
Order	Artist	Age	Hometown	Song	Andrzej	Kayah	Nergal	Ania
1	Edyta Strzycka	27	Kielce	"Tell Me 'bout It"	—	✔	—	✔
2	Urszula Kunicka	23	N/A	"Rolling in the Deep"	—	—	—	—
3	Anna Galstyan	24	Łomża	"Empire State of Mind"	—	—	✔	—
4	Michalina Malinowska	21	Wojnów	"Hey, Soul Sister"	✔	—	—	—
5	Robert Narwojsz	N/A	N/A	"Easy"	—	—	—	—
6	Michał Haratym	22	N/A	"Because of You"	—	—	—	—
7	Katarzyna Jaźnicka	29	N/A	"Lost"	—	—	—	✔

=== Episode 10: The Wildcards (October 1, 2011) ===
Order	Artist	Age	Hometown	Song	Coach's and contestant's choices			
Order	Artist	Age	Hometown	Song	Andrzej	Kayah	Nergal	Ania
1	Maciej Moszyński	N/A	Zielona Góra	"You Are the Sunshine of My Life"	✔	✔	—	✔
2	Patrycja Kawęcka	27	Radom	"Paparazzi"	—	—	—	✔
3	Cezary Makiewicz & Zbigniew Hofman	N/A	N/A	"Love You More"	—	—	—	—
4	Krzysztof Kubiś	N/A	Warsaw	"Daughters"	✔	—	✔	—
5	Aleksandra Kasprzyk	28	Siemianowice Śląskie	"Sweet Child o' Mine"	—	—	✔	—

== The Battle Rounds ==
Color keys

Artist won the Battle and advances to the Live shows
Artist lost the Battle and was eliminated

Episode & Date	Coach	Order	Winner	Song	Loser
Episode 11 (October 8)	Andrzej Piaseczny	1	Rafał Brzozowski	"Let Me Entertain You"	Bartłomiej Grzanek
Episode 11 (October 8)	Ania Dąbrowska	2	Ewa Szlachcic	"Thriller"	Marta Maliszewska
Episode 11 (October 8)	Nergal	3	Damian Ukeje	"Another Way to Die"	Anna Galstyan
Episode 11 (October 8)	Kayah	4	Edyta Strzycka	"I'm Every Woman"	Małgorzata Kuś
Episode 11 (October 8)	Andrzej Piaseczny	5	Ian Rooth	"Amazing"	Natalia Skalska
Episode 11 (October 8)	Nergal	6	Monika Urlik	"Nine Million Bicycles"	Marta Michalska-Uras
Episode 11 (October 8)	Kayah	7	Mirosław Witkowski	"I Got You (I Feel Good)"	Mariusz Kozak
Episode 11 (October 8)	Ania Dąbrowska	8	Karolina Charko	"In The Ghetto"	Jakub Foltak
Episode 12 (October 15)	Nergal	1	Gabriel Fleszar	"Party"	Adam Miroszczuk
Episode 12 (October 15)	Ania Dąbrowska	2	Aleksandra Galewska	"Son of a Preacher Man"	Patrycja Kawęcka
Episode 12 (October 15)	Andrzej Piaseczny	3	Katarzyna Lisowska	"Hot n Cold"	Anna Sokołek
Episode 12 (October 15)	Kayah	4	Kaja Domińska	"Opowieść"	Marta Florek
Episode 12 (October 15)	Nergal	5	Filip Sałapa	"I Love Rock 'n' Roll"	Aleksandra Kasprzyk
Episode 12 (October 15)	Ania Dąbrowska	6	Katarzyna Klimczyk	"Never Tear Us Apart"	Katarzyna Jaźnicka
Episode 12 (October 15)	Kayah	7	Filip Moniuszko	"I Want to Know What Love Is"	Marcin Koczot
Episode 12 (October 15)	Andrzej Piaseczny	8	Antoni Smykiewicz	"Stop and Stare"	Martyna Ciok
Episode 13 (October 22)	Ania Dąbrowska	1	Piotr Niesłuchowski	"You Get What You Give"	Katarzyna Kubik
Episode 13 (October 22)	Andrzej Piaseczny	2	Krzysztof Kubiś	"Over My Shoulder"	Rafał Szatan
Episode 13 (October 22)	Nergal	3	Ares Chadzinikolau	"Waiting on the World to Change"	Joanna Makaruk
Episode 13 (October 22)	Kayah	4	Mateusz Krautwurst	"If I Ain't Got You"	Karolina Leszko
Episode 13 (October 22)	Ania Dąbrowska	5	Aleksandra Pieczara	"I Kissed a Girl"	Dominika Skowron
Episode 13 (October 22)	Andrzej Piaseczny	6	Ewa Kłosowicz	"One of Us"	Michalina Malinowska
Episode 13 (October 22)	Kayah	7	Maciej Moszyński	"Sutra"	Milena Masłowska
Episode 13 (October 22)	Nergal	8	Ewelina Kordy	"One Day In Your Life"	Katarzyna Grabowska

== Sing-off ==
Each coach nominates 4 singers from their group to advance to the live shows. The 2 remaining singers per group will do a sing-off for the remaining live show spot.

=== Episode 14 (October 22, 2011) ===
Color keys

Artist won the sing-off and advances to the Live shows
Artist lost the sing-off and was eliminated

Order	Coach	Song	Artists		Song
1	Andrzej Piaseczny	"Daughters"	Krzysztof Kubiś	Rafał Brzozowski	"Everything"
2	Kayah	"You Are the Sunshine of My Life"	Maciej Moszyński	Mirosław Witkowski	"This Ain't Gonna Work"
3	Nergal	"Alive"	Filip Sałapa	Gabriel Fleszar	"The Lazy Song"
4	Ania Dąbrowska	"Need You Now"	Ewa Szlachcic	Aleksandra Pieczara	"Left Outside Alone"

== The Live Shows ==
Color keys

Artist was saved by the public's vote
Artist was part of the bottom two in his/her team
Artist was saved by his/her coach
Artist was eliminated

=== Episode 15 (October 29, 2011) ===
Order	Coach	Artist	Song	Result
1	Kayah	Maciej Moszyński	"Virtual Insanity"	Bottom two
2	Andrzej Piaseczny	Rafał Brzozowski	"Always"	Public's vote
3	Kayah	Edyta Strzycka	"GoldenEye"	Kayah's choice
4	Andrzej Piaseczny	Ian Rooth	"Friday I'm in Love"	Bottom two
5	Kayah	Filip Moniuszko	"Don't Stop the Music"	Public's vote
6	Andrzej Piaseczny	Ewa Kłosowicz	"Piosenka księżycowa"	Bottom two
7	Kayah	Mateusz Krautwurst	"Closer"	Bottom two
8	Andrzej Piaseczny	Katarzyna Lisowska	"Let's Dance"	Andrzej's choice
9	Kayah	Kaja Domińska	"Nothing Compares 2 U"	Public's vote
10	Andrzej Piaseczny	Antoni Smykiewicz	"The One I Love"	Public's vote
Sing-off
1	Kayah	Maciej Moszyński	"Virtual Insanity"	Eliminated
2	Kayah	Mateusz Krautwurst	"Closer"	Kayah's choice
3	Andrzej Piaseczny	Ian Rooth	"Friday I'm in Love"	Andrzej's choice
4	Andrzej Piaseczny	Ewa Kłosowicz	"Piosenka księżycowa"	Eliminated

Non-competition performances
Order	Performers	Song
1	Ben Saunders	"Dry Your Eyes"
2	Team Andrzej Piaseczny	"Kiss"
3	Team Kayah	"Fever"
4	Ben Saunders	"If you don't know me by now"

=== Episode 16 (November 5, 2011) ===
Order	Coach	Artist	Song	Result
1	Nergal	Damian Ukeje	"Polski"	Public's vote
2	Ania Dąbrowska	Karolina Charko	"Fade into You"	Ania's choice
3	Nergal	Filip Sałapa	"Enjoy the Silence"	Bottom two
4	Ania Dąbrowska	Katarzyna Klimczyk	"Supergirl"	Bottom two
5	Nergal	Monika Urlik	"Run to the Hills"	Public's vote
6	Ania Dąbrowska	Ewa Szlachcic	"Black Velvet"	Bottom two
7	Nergal	Ares Chadzinikolau	"Knockin' on Heaven's Door"	Bottom two
8	Ania Dąbrowska	Piotr Niesłuchowski	"Losing My Religion"	Public's vote
9	Nergal	Ewelina Kordy	"You Know I'm No Good"	Nergal's choice
10	Ania Dąbrowska	Aleksandra Galewska	"Warwick Avenue"	Public's vote
Sing-off
1	Nergal	Filip Sałapa	"Enjoy the Silence"	Eliminated
2	Nergal	Ares Chadzinikolau	"Knockin' on Heaven's Door"	Nergal's choice
3	Ania Dąbrowska	Katarzyna Klimczyk	"Supergirl"	Eliminated
4	Ania Dąbrowska	Ewa Szlachcic	"Black Velvet"	Ania's choice

=== Episode 17 (November 12, 2011) ===
Order	Coach	Artist	Song	Result
1	Andrzej Piaseczny	Ian Rooth	"Moves Like Jagger"	Bottom two
2	Kayah	Kaja Domińska	"Against All Odds"	Bottom two
3	Andrzej Piaseczny	Antoni Smykiewicz	"Siłacz"	Public's vote
4	Kayah	Filip Moniuszko	"Bring Me to Life"	Bottom two
5	Kayah	Mateusz Krautwurst	"Ostatni"	Public's vote
6	Andrzej Piaseczny	Rafał Brzozowski	"I Belong to You"	Bottom two
7	Kayah	Edyta Strzycka	"Beautiful"	Kayah's choice
8	Andrzej Piaseczny	Katarzyna Lisowska	"End of the Road"	Andrzej's choice
Sing-off
1	Andrzej Piaseczny	Ian Rooth	"Moves Like Jagger"	Eliminated
2	Andrzej Piaseczny	Rafał Brzozowski	"I Belong to You"	Andrzej's choice
3	Kayah	Kaja Domińska	"Against All Odds"	Eliminated
4	Kayah	Filip Moniuszko	"Bring Me to Life"	Kayah's choice

Non-competition performances
Order	Performers	Song
1	Team Kayah	"Lśnię"
2	Ewa Farna	"Bez łez"
3	Team Andrzej Piaseczny	"One"
4	Ewa Farna	"Nie przegap"
5	Kim Wilde	"Sleeping satelite"

=== Episode 18 (November 19, 2011) ===
Order	Coach	Artist	Song	Result
1	Nergal	Ares Chadzinikolau	"Billionaire"	Bottom two
2	Ania Dąbrowska	Aleksandra Galewska	"Georgia on My Mind"	Public's vote
3	Ania Dąbrowska	Karolina Charko	"Little Wing"	Bottom two
4	Nergal	Ewelina Kordy	"Born This Way"	Bottom two
5	Nergal	Damian Ukeje	"Smells Like Teen Spirit"	Nergal's choice
6	Ania Dąbrowska	Ewa Szlachcic	"No One"	Bottom two
7	Nergal	Monika Urlik	"Halo"	Public's vote
8	Ania Dąbrowska	Piotr Niesłuchowski	"Zombie"	Ania's choice
Sing-off
1	Nergal	Ares Chadzinikolau	"Billionaire"	Eliminated
2	Nergal	Ewelina Kordy	"Born This Way"	Nergal's choice
3	Ania Dąbrowska	Karolina Charko	"Little Wing"	Ania's choice
4	Ania Dąbrowska	Ewa Szlachcic	"No One"	Eliminated

Non-competition performances
Order	Performers	Song
1	Team Nergal	"Come together"
2	Afromental	"Rock & rollin' love"
3	Team Ania Dąbrowska	"Bang bang"
4	Bracia	"Za szkłem"
5	Afromental	"The bomb"

=== Episode 19 (November 26, 2011) ===
Order	Coach	Artist	Song	Result
1	Kayah	Edyta Strzycka	"Forget You"	Bottom two
2	Ania Dąbrowska	Karolina Charko	"Hallelujah"	Bottom two
3	Andrzej Piaseczny	Rafał Brzozowski	"Szczęśliwego Nowego Jorku"	Public's vote
4	Nergal	Monika Urlik	"Beat It"	Bottom two
5	Andrzej Piaseczny	Katarzyna Lisowska	"Kiedyś Cię znajdę"	Bottom two
6	Kayah	Mateusz Krautwurst	"It's My Life"	Bottom two
7	Ania Dąbrowska	Piotr Niesłuchowski	"Are You Gonna Be My Girl"	Bottom two
8	Nergal	Ewelina Kordy	"Szał"	Bottom two
9	Kayah	Filip Moniuszko	"Nie proszę o więcej"	Public's vote
10	Andrzej Piaseczny	Antoni Smykiewicz	"Iris"	Bottom two
11	Ania Dąbrowska	Aleksandra Galewska	"Hey Ya!"	Public's vote
12	Nergal	Damian Ukeje	"Nothing Else Matters"	Public's vote
Sing-off
1	Andrzej Piaseczny	Katarzyna Lisowska	"Broken Strings"	Eliminated
2	Andrzej Piaseczny	Antoni Smykiewicz	"Scenariusz dla moich sąsiadów"	Andrzej's choice
3	Ania Dąbrowska	Karolina Charko	"Hero"	Eliminated
4	Ania Dąbrowska	Piotr Niesłuchowski	"Urke"	Ania's choice
5	Nergal	Monika Urlik	"Tak... Tak... to ja"	Nergal's choice
6	Nergal	Ewelina Kordy	"Only Girl (In the World)"	Eliminated
7	Kayah	Mateusz Krautwurst	"Prócz Ciebie nic"	Kayah's choice
8	Kayah	Edyta Strzycka	"Empire State of Mind"	Eliminated

=== Episode 20: December 3, 2011 ===
Competition Performances

Performance Order	Coach	Contestant	Song	Coach points (%)	Public points (%)	Total (%)	Result
1	Kayah	Filip Moniuszko	"Rock DJ"	50%	45%	95%	Eliminated
2	Andrzej Piaseczny	Rafał Brzozowski	"You Can Leave Your Hat On"	35%	49%	84%	Eliminated
3	Kayah	Mateusz Krautwurst	"I Believe I Can Fly"	50%	55%	105%	Safe
4	Nergal	Monika Urlik	"Think"	40%	45%	85%	Eliminated
5	Ania Dąbrowska	Aleksandra Galewska	"Nie ma, nie ma Ciebie"	40%	52%	92%	Eliminated
6	Andrzej Piaseczny	Antoni Smykiewicz	"Can't Get You Out of My Head"	65%	51%	116%	Safe
7	Ania Dąbrowska	Piotr Niesłuchowski	"Crazy In Love"	60%	48%	108%	Safe
8	Nergal	Damian Ukeje	"Purple Rain"	60%	55%	115%	Safe

Duets

Performance Order	Coach	Contestant 1	Contestant 2	Song
3	Nergal	Damian Ukeje	Monika Urlik	"Light My Fire"
6	Andrzej Piaseczny	Rafał Brzozowski	Antoni Smykiewicz	"Dude (Looks Like a Lady)"
9	Kayah	Filip Moniuszko	Mateusz Krautwurst	"This Love"
12	Ania Dąbrowska	Piotr Niesłuchowski	Aleksandra Galewska	"I Got You Babe"

Finalists' songs

Performance Order	Coach	Contestant	Song
13	Ania Dąbrowska	Piotr Niesłuchowski	"There’s Nothing Wrong"
14	Andrzej Piaseczny	Antoni Smykiewicz	"Jaki jestem"
15	Kayah	Mateusz Krautwurst	"Tego nam życzę"
16	Nergal	Damian Ukeje	"Nie mamy nic"

Non-competition performances
Order	Performers	Song
1	Lipali & Damian Ukeje	"Jeżozwierz"
2	Ive Mendes	"I don't want to talk about it"
3	Neo Retros	"The high-rise in the sunshine"
4	Ive Mendes	"If you leave me now"

=== Final: December 10, 2011 ===
Performance Order	Coach	Contestant	Song	Result
1	Nergal	Damian Ukeje	"Enter Sandman"	
2	Kayah	Mateusz Krautwurst	"Kiss From a Rose"	
3	Ania Dąbrowska	Piotr Niesłuchowski	"Nie stało się nic"	
4	Andrzej Piaseczny	Antoni Smykiewicz	"You're Beautiful"	
7	Kayah	Mateusz Krautwurst	"Closer"	4th Place
8	Andrzej Piaseczny	Antoni Smykiewicz	"The One I Love"	Safe
9	Nergal	Damian Ukeje	"Another Way to Die"	Safe
10	Ania Dąbrowska	Piotr Niesłuchowski	"Sex on Fire"	Safe

Duets

Performance Order	Contestant 1	Contestant 2	Song
5	Damian Ukeje	Mateusz Krautwurst	"Tears in Heaven"
6	Piotr Niesłuchowski	Antoni Smykiewicz	"Hey Jude"

Duets with coaches

Performance Order	Coach	Contestant	Song	Result
11	Andrzej Piaseczny	Antoni Smykiewicz	"Chodź, przytul, przebacz"	Safe
12	Ania Dąbrowska	Piotr Niesłuchowski	"Somebody to Love"	3rd Place
13	Nergal	Damian Ukeje	"Highway to Hell"	Safe
14	Kayah	Mateusz Krautwurst	Ain't No Mountain High Enough	4th Place

Finalists' songs

Performance Order	Coach	Contestant	Song	Result
15	Nergal	Damian Ukeje	"Nie mamy nic"	Winner
16	Andrzej Piaseczny	Antoni Smykiewicz	"Jaki jestem"	Runner-up
17	Ania Dąbrowska	Piotr Niesłuchowski	"There’s Nothing Wrong"	3rd Place

Non-competition performances
Order	Performers	Song
1	Top 4 Finalists	"Crazy"
2	Garou	"For you"
3	Garou & Top 4 Finalists	"New year's day"
4	Coaches & All Teams	"Another brick in the wall pt. 2"

== Results table ==
–	Contestant was the winner
–	Contestant was the runner-up
–	Contestant was the second runner-up
–	Contestant was the fourth place
–	Contestant was saved by public
–	Contestant was saved by coach
–	Contestant was saved by coach after a sing-off
–	Contestant was not chosen by public or coach and was eliminated

Team Ania
Candidate	Battle 1	Battle 2	Battle 3	Sing-Off	Show 2	Show 4	Show 5	Semi-Final	Final
Piotr Niesłuchowski	—	—	Safe	—	Safe	Safe	Safe	Safe (108%)	3rd
Aleksandra Galewska	—	Safe	—	—	Safe	Safe	Safe	Eliminated (92%)	
Karolina Charko	Safe	—	—	—	Safe	Safe	Eliminated (Show 5)		
Ewa Szlachcic	Safe	—	—	Safe	Safe	Eliminated (Show 4)			
Katarzyna Klimczyk	—	Safe	—	—	Eliminated (Show 2)				
Aleksandra Pieczara	—	—	Safe	Eliminated (Sing-off)					
Dominika Skowron	—	—	Eliminated (Battle 3)						
Katarzyna Kubik	—	—	Eliminated (Battle 3)						
Katarzyna Jaźnicka	—	Eliminated (Battle 2)							
Patrycja Kawęcka	—	Eliminated (Battle 2)							
Jakub Foltak	Eliminated (Battle 1)								
Marta Maliszewska	Eliminated (Battle 1)								
Team Nergal
Candidate	Battle 1	Battle 2	Battle 3	Sing-Off	Show 2	Show 4	Show 5	Semi-Final	Final
Damian Ukeje	Safe	—	—	—	Safe	Safe	Safe	Safe (115%)	1st
Monika Urlik	Safe	—	—	—	Safe	Safe	Safe	Eliminated (85%)	
Ewelina Kordy	—	—	Safe	—	Safe	Safe	Eliminated (Show 5)		
Ares Chadzinikolau	—	—	Safe	—	Safe	Eliminated (Show 4)			
Filip Sałapa	—	Safe	—	Safe	Eliminated (Show 2)				
Gabriel Fleszar	—	Safe	—	Eliminated (Sing-off)					
Katarzyna Grabowska	—	—	Eliminated (Battle 3)						
Joanna Makaruk	—	—	Eliminated (Battle 3)						
Aleksandra Kasprzyk	—	Eliminated (Battle 2)							
Adam Miroszczuk	—	Eliminated (Battle 2)							
Marta Michalska-Uras	Eliminated (Battle 1)								
Anna Galstyan	Eliminated (Battle 1)								
Team Kayah
Candidate	Battle 1	Battle 2	Battle 3	Sing-Off	Show 1	Show 3	Show 5	Semi-Final	Final
Mateusz Krautwurst	—	—	Safe	—	Safe	Safe	Safe	Safe (105%)	4th
Filip Moniuszko	—	Safe	—	—	Safe	Safe	Safe	Eliminated (95%)	
Edyta Strzycka	Safe	—	—	—	Safe	Safe	Eliminated (Show 5)		
Kaja Domińska	—	Safe	—	—	Safe	Eliminated (Show 3)			
Maciej Moszyński	—	—	Safe	Safe	Eliminated (Show 1)				
Mirosław Witkowski	Safe	—	—	Eliminated (Sing-off)					
Milena Masłowska	—	—	Eliminated (Battle 3)						
Karolina Leszko	—	—	Eliminated (Battle 3)						
Marcin Koczot	—	Eliminated (Battle 2)							
Marta Florek	—	Eliminated (Battle 2)							
Mariusz Kozak	Eliminated (Battle 1)								
Małgorzata Kuś	Eliminated (Battle 1)								
Team Andrzej
Candidate	Battle 1	Battle 2	Battle 3	Sing-Off	Show 1	Show 3	Show 5	Semi-Final	Final
Antoni Smykiewicz	—	Safe	—	—	Safe	Safe	Safe	Safe (116%)	2nd
Rafał Brzozowski	Safe	—	—	Safe	Safe	Safe	Safe	Eliminated (84%)	
Katarzyna Lisowska	—	Safe	—	—	Safe	Safe	Eliminated (Show 5)		
Ian Rooth	Safe	—	—	—	Safe	Eliminated (Show 3)			
Ewa Kłosowicz	—	—	Safe	—	Eliminated (Show 1)				
Kris Kubiś	—	—	Safe	Eliminated (Sing-off)					
Michalina Malinowska	—	—	Eliminated (Battle 3)						
Rafał Szatan	—	—	Eliminated (Battle 3)						
Martyna Ciok	—	Eliminated (Battle 2)							
Anna Sokołek	—	Eliminated (Battle 2)							
Natalia Skalska	Eliminated (Battle 1)								
Bartek Grzanek	Eliminated (Battle 1)								

== Ratings ==
Episode	Date	Viewers	Market Share
Blind Auditions 1	3 September	1 836 752	14,90%
Blind Auditions 2	3 September	2 070 512	15,58%
Blind Auditions 3	10 September	2 229 883	16,58%
Blind Auditions 4	10 September	2 138 165	15,45%
Blind Auditions 5	17 September	2 178 894	16,35%
Blind Auditions 6	17 September	2 508 579	18,47%
Blind Auditions 7	24 September	2 386 555	16,70%
Blind Auditions 8	24 September	2 587 801	18,14%
Blind Auditions 9	1 October	2 554 624	18,28%
The Wildcards	1 October	2 380 008	17,21%
Battles 1	8 October	2 502 268	16,55%
Battles 2	15 October	2 451 655	16,29%
Battles 3	22 October	2 031 849	13,54%
Sing-off	22 October	2 622 650	18,36%
Live Show 1	29 October	2 265 356	14,80%
Live Show 1: Results	29 October	2 688 627	18,52%
Live Show 2	5 November	2 021 085	12,93%
Live Show 2: Results	5 November	2 252 899	15,31%
Live Show 3	12 November	2 004 059	13,40%
Live Show 3: Results	12 November	2 387 569	17,25%
Live Show 4	19 November	1 874 423	12,62%
Live Show 4: Results	19 November	1 924 930	13,74%
Quarterfinal	26 November	1 721 938	11,75%
Quarterfinal: Results	26 November	2 069 632	14,98%
Semifinal	3 December	2 296 159	15,69%
Semifinal: Results	3 December	2 510 649	18,68%
Final	10 December	2 736 452	17,63%
Final: Results	10 December	2 818 940	19,61%
