= Fanfan la Tulipe (2003 film) =

- Directed by: Gérard Krawczyk
- Written by: Luc Besson; Jean Cosmos
- Based on: Fanfan la Tulipe; 1952 film by Christian-Jaque
- Produced by: Luc Besson; Bernard Grenet
- Starring: Vincent Perez
- Cinematography: Gérard Simon
- Edited by: Nicolas Trembasiewicz
- Music by: Alexandre Azaria
- Release date: 14 May 2003
- Running time: 97 minutes
- Country: France
- Language: French
- Budget: $22 million
- Box office: $9.4 million

Fanfan la Tulipe (Fanfan the Tulip) is a 2003 French swashbuckler comedy directed by Gérard Krawczyk and starring Vincent Perez and Penélope Cruz. It was screened out of competition at the 2003 Cannes Film Festival. It is a remake of the 1952 film Fanfan la Tulipe.

== Synopsis ==
A charming swashbuckler is tricked into enlisting into the army of Louis XV in the mistaken belief that he will therefore be allowed to marry one of the King's daughters.

== Cast ==
- Vincent Perez as Fanfan la Tulipe
- Penélope Cruz as Adeline la Franchise
- Didier Bourdon as Louis XV
- Hélène de Fougerolles as Madame de Pompadour
- Michel Muller as Tranche Montagne
- Philippe Dormoy as Pierre Bras
- Jacques Frantz as Franchise
- Gérald Laroche as Corsini
- Magdalena Mielcarz as Henriette de France
- Anna Majcher as Wanda
- Guillaume Gallienne as Houlette
- Gilles Arbona as Marechal
- Jean-Pol Dubois as L'aumônier
- Yves Pignot as Guillaume
- Jean-François Lapalus as L'oncle de Lison
- François Chattot as Le cure
- Jacques Dynam as Chaville

== Reception ==
On review aggregator Rotten Tomatoes, Fanfan la Tulipe holds an approval rating of 14%, based on 7 reviews, and an average rating of 5/10.
