= Quo Vadis (2001 film) =

2001 Polish film by Jerzy Kawalerowicz

- Poster
- Directed by: Jerzy Kawalerowicz
- Screenplay by: Jerzy Kawalerowicz
- Based on: Quo Vadis; 1896 novel by Henryk Sienkiewicz
- Produced by: Mirosław Słowiński; Jerzy Kajetan Frykowski
- Starring: Paweł Deląg; Magdalena Mielcarz; Bogusław Linda
- Cinematography: Andrzej J. Jaroszewicz
- Edited by: Cezary Grzesiuk; Chuck Bush
- Music by: Jan Kaczmarek
- Production company: Studio Filmowe Kadr
- Distributed by: Studio Filmowe Kadr
- Release date: 14 September 2001
- Running time: 160 minutes
- Country: Poland
- Language: Polish
- Budget: $ 18 million (ca.76 140 000 PLN)
- Box office: 4.2 million admissions (Poland)

Quo Vadis is a 2001 Polish film directed by Jerzy Kawalerowicz based on the 1896 book of the same title by Henryk Sienkiewicz. It was Poland's submission to the 74th Academy Awards for the Academy Award for Best Foreign Language Film, but was not nominated.

== Plot ==
The central plot in the movie revolves around the love of a Roman patrician, Marcus Vinicius, towards a Christian girl (coming from the territory of modern-day Poland) set against the backdrop of the persecutions against Christians during the reign of Nero.

In the beginning, Lygia, a Christian and hostage of Rome, becomes the object of Vinicius' love but she refuses his advances. Vinicius' friend Petronius tries to manipulate Nero, who has authority over all Roman hostages, to give Lygia to Vinicius, but Lygia is taken into hiding by Christians. Marcus Vinicius decides to find her and force her to be his wife. He goes to a Christian meeting along with Croton, a gladiator, to find her. After following her from the meeting, Marcus tries to take her, but Ursus, a strong man and friend of Lygia, kills Croton. Marcus himself is wounded in the fight, but is taken care of by Lygia and the Christians. Seeing their kindness he begins to convert to Christianity, and Lygia accepts him.

Rome catches fire while the emperor, Nero, is away. Nero returns and sings to the crowd, but they become angry. At the suggestion of Nero's wife, the Christians are blamed for the fire, providing a long series of cruel spectacles to appease the crowd. In one of the spectacles, Ursus faces a bull carrying Lygia on its back. Ursus wins and, with the crowd and guards in approval, Nero lets them live.

Nero kills himself, and Vinicius and Lygia leave Rome.

== Cast ==
- Paweł Deląg as Marcus Vinicius
- Magdalena Mielcarz as Lygie Callina
- Bogusław Linda as Petronius
- Michał Bajor as Nero
- Agnieszka Wagner as Poppaea Sabina
- Jerzy Trela as Chilon Chilonides
- Danuta Stenka as Pomponia Graecina
- Franciszek Pieczka as Saint Peter
- Krzysztof Majchrzak as Tigellinus
- Rafał Kubacki as Ursus
- Wojciech Olszański as Faon
- Andrzej Zieliński as Epaphroditus

== Reception ==
It was the most popular Polish film of the year with 4.2 million admissions.

== See also ==
- Cinema of Poland
- List of submissions to the 74th Academy Awards for Best Foreign Language Film
