= Magdalena Mielcarz =

Polish actress, model and singer (born 1978)

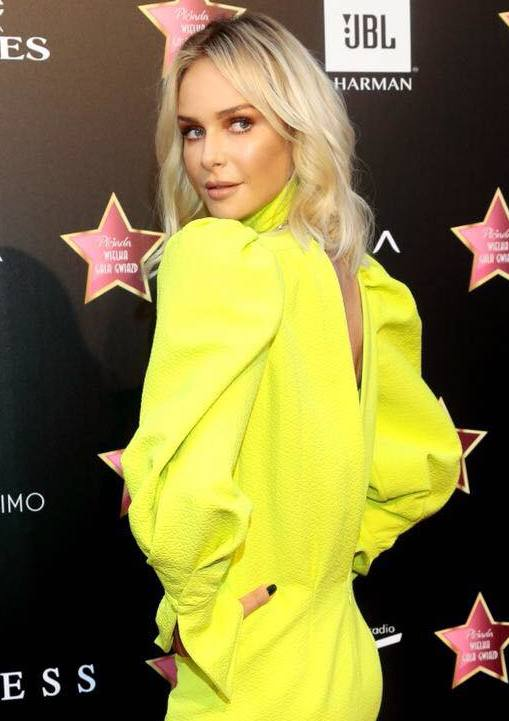
- Mielcarz at an event in Poland in 2018
- Born: 3 March 1978 (age 48); Warsaw, Poland
- Other name: Lvma Black
- Modeling information
- Height: 177 cm (5 ft 10 in)
- Hair color: Blond
- Eye color: Blue
- Agency: Avant Models: Warsaw

Magdalena Mielcarz (born 3 March 1978) is a Polish actress, model and singer also known as Lvma Black.

== Career ==
As a model, she appeared on numerous covers of magazines like Elle, Cosmopolitan, InStyle, Glamour and worked with designers like Valentino and Missoni. She was the first Polish woman to sign a contract with the cosmetic brand L'Oréal. Her acting career started in 2001 when she played a leading role in the Polish blockbuster movie Quo Vadis directed by an Oscar nominee Jerzy Kawalerowicz. She later acted in numerous films in Europe like Fanfan la Tulipe (2003), Strange Crime (2004), and Taras Bulba (2009). Mielcarz hosted Polish version of The Voice franchise in 2011 and 2014. She was named Glamour Poland's Woman of the Year in 2011.

In 2011, she launched her music career by releasing the single "Drown in Me". Since 2019, she is releasing her music as Lvma Black. Her 2019 single "I C U" charted in Poland at number 61.

Mielcarz holds a master's degree in Journalism and Political Science from the University of Warsaw, and is also a graduate of the Maggie Flanigan Drama Studio in New York. She currently lives in Los Angeles, with her husband and their two daughters.

== Filmography ==
Year	Title	Role	Notes
1989	Paziowie	Królewna Jadwisia	
2001	Quo Vadis	Ligia Kallina	Movie film
2002	Quo Vadis	Ligia Kallina	TV series
2003	Fanfan la Tulipe	Henriette of France	
2003	Ostatni człowiek		Short
2004	Strange Crime	Ewa	
2005	Solidarity.	Dorota	Short
2007	Fałszerze. Powrót sfory	Ola	Miniseries; 9 episodes
2008	Limousine	Katarzyna	
2009	BrzydUla	Julia Sławińska	TV series
2009	Taras Bulba	Panna Elzhbeta	
2009	Today and Tomorrow	Kasia	Short
2010	Poland's Next Top Model	Herself; Host	TV show; Season 1
2011	Och, Karol 2	Beata	
2011	Treatment		
2011, 2014	The Voice of Poland	Herself; host	TV show; Seasons: 1, 5
2014	Paranoia	Magda	Short

== Discography ==
=== Single ===
Title	Year	Peak chart positions		Album
Title	Year	POL	POL New	Album
"Drown in Me"	2011	—	—	Non-album singles
"Silver Dream"	2014	—	—	Non-album singles
"Stormy Wave"	2015	—	—	Non-album singles
"Sister Army"	2017	—	—	Non-album singles
"I C U" (as Lvma Black)	2019	61	4	TBA
"—" denotes items which failed to chart.

=== Music video ===
- 2011: "Drown in Me"
- 2014: "Silver Dream"
- 2015: "Stormy Wave"
- 2019: "I C U" (as Lvma Black)

== Agencies ==
Country	Agency	City
Poland	Avant Models	Warsaw
