= Naucz mnie =

Single by Sarsa

from the album Zapomnij mi
- Released: 30 April 2015
- Genre: Electropop; indie pop
- Length: 3:17
- Label: Universal Music Polska
- Songwriter: Marta Markiewicz
- Producers: Markiewicz; Tomasz Konfederak

Sarsa singles chronology
"Naucz mnie" (2015)	"Indiana" (2015)

"Naucz mnie" (English: Teach me) is the debut single by Polish singer Sarsa. The song was released as the first single from her debut studio album Zapomnij mi on 30 April 2015, and was written by Sarsa with production by Sarsa along with Tomasz Konfederak.

The single reached number 1 on the Polish Airplay Chart and was certified diamond.

== Music video ==
A music video to accompany the release of "Naucz mnie" was released on 5 May 2015 through Sarsa's Vevo channel. It was directed by Olga Czyżykiewicz.

== Track listing ==
Digital download
No.	Title	Length
1.	"Naucz mnie"	3:17

== Charts and certifications ==
=== Weekly charts ===
Chart (2015)	Peak position
Poland (Polish Airplay Top 20)	1
Poland (Polish Airplay – New)	1
Poland (Polish TV Airplay Chart)	1

=== Year-end charts ===
Chart (2015)	Position
Poland (ZPAV)	11

=== Certifications ===
Region	Certification	Certified units/sales
Poland (ZPAV)	Diamond	100,000^{*}
^{*} Sales figures based on certification alone.

== Awards and nominations ==
Year	Award Show	Category	Result
2015	Lato Zet i Dwójki 2015 (Kołobrzeg)	Hit of the Concert	Won
2015	Lato Zet i Dwójki 2015 (Łodź)	Hit of the Concert	Won
2015	Eska Music Awards 2015	Biggest Hit	Won

== Release history ==
Region	Date	Format	Label
Poland	30 April 2015	Digital download	Universal Music Polska
