= The Voice of Poland season 5 =

The Voice of Poland
- Season 5
- Hosted by: Tomasz Kammel; Magdalena Mielcarz; Maciej Musiał (V Reporter); Marta Siurnik (V Reporter); Małgorzata Bodecka (V Reporter)
- Judges: Tomson & Baron; Edyta Górniak; Justyna Steczkowska; Marek Piekarczyk
- Winner: Aleksandra Nizio
- Runner-up: Przemysław Radziszewski

Release
- Original network: TVP2
- Original release: September 6 – December 6, 2014

Season chronology
- ← Previous; Season 4 Next → Season 6

The fifth season of The Voice of Poland began airing 6 September 2014 on TVP 2.

For this season, teams increased to 13 artists, up from 12 last season. "The Cross-Battles" were introduced in the semifinal.

== Hosts and coaches ==
There had been rumours that Justyna Steczkowska and Marek Piekarczyk will not be returning for the fifth season. Halina Mlynkova, Grzegorz Skawiński and Janusz Panasewicz were said to join the judging panel. On 14 July 2014, it was announced that Marek Piekarczyk would be leaving the show. Maria Sadowska would be leaving the show too - she announced it on her fanpage on 15 July 2014. On 24 July 2014, Marika announced that she will not be returning for her fourth season as a host. On 26 July 2014 it was revealed that the judges will be Justyna Steczkowska, Tomson & Baron, Marek Piekarczyk and Edyta Górniak, who was a judge on season three. Despite information about Marek Piekarczyk's departure, he will return for his fourth season. On 7 August 2014 it was revealed, that Magdalena Mielcarz, who served as a host in season one, will return to the show replacing Marika.

Coaches and Hosts gallery

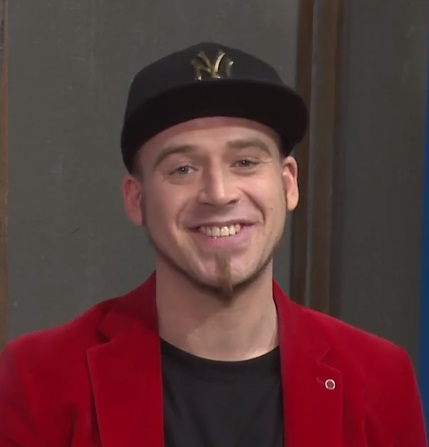
Tomasz Lach (duo)

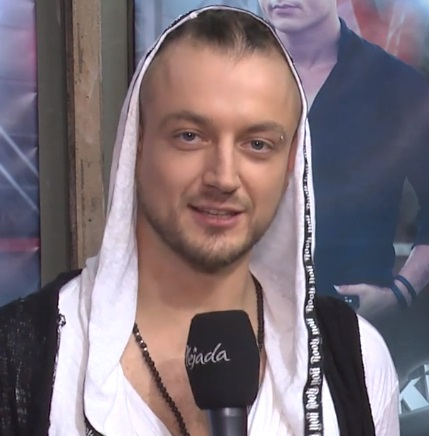
Aleksandr Milwiw-Baron (duo)

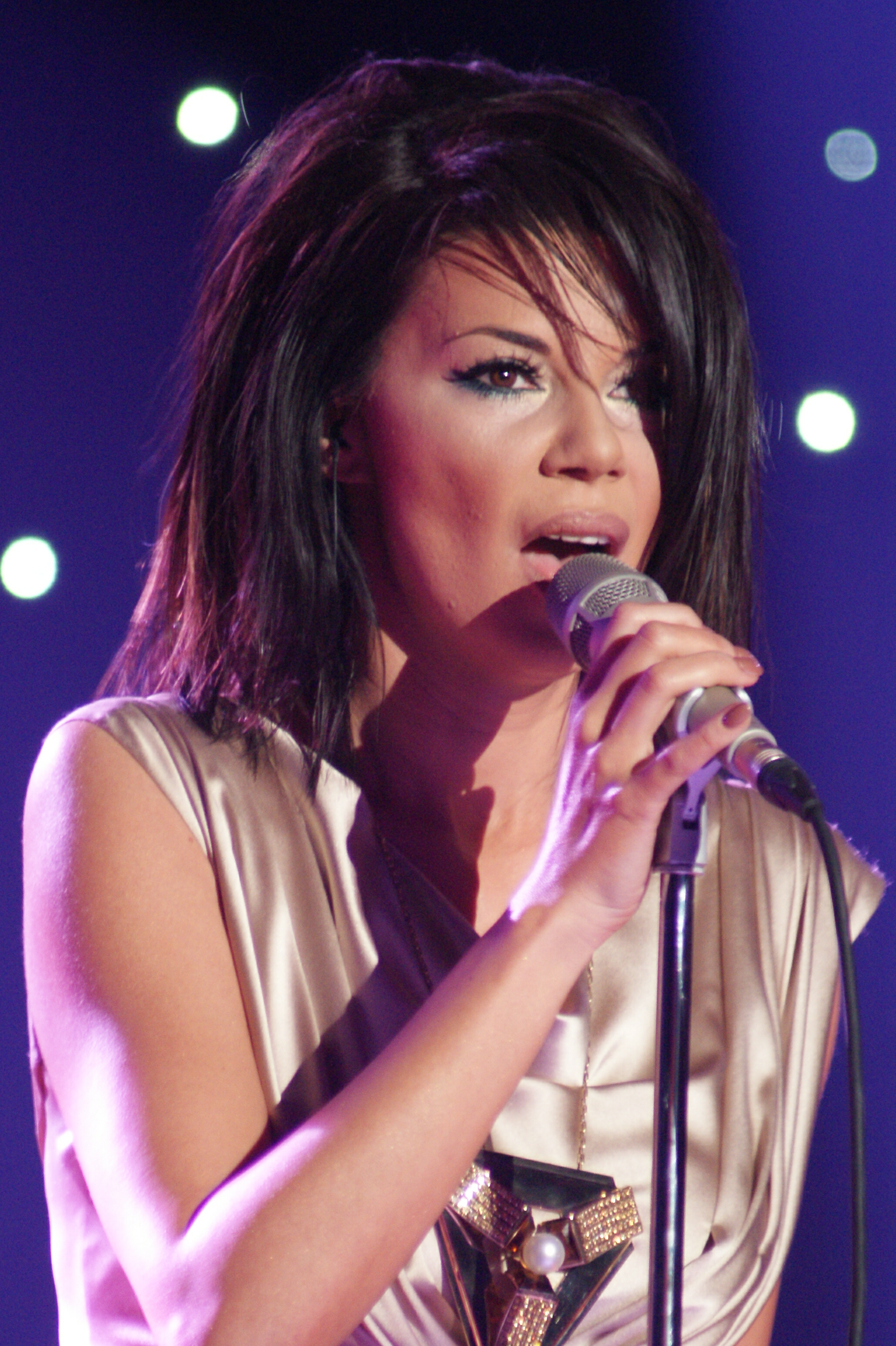
Edyta Górniak

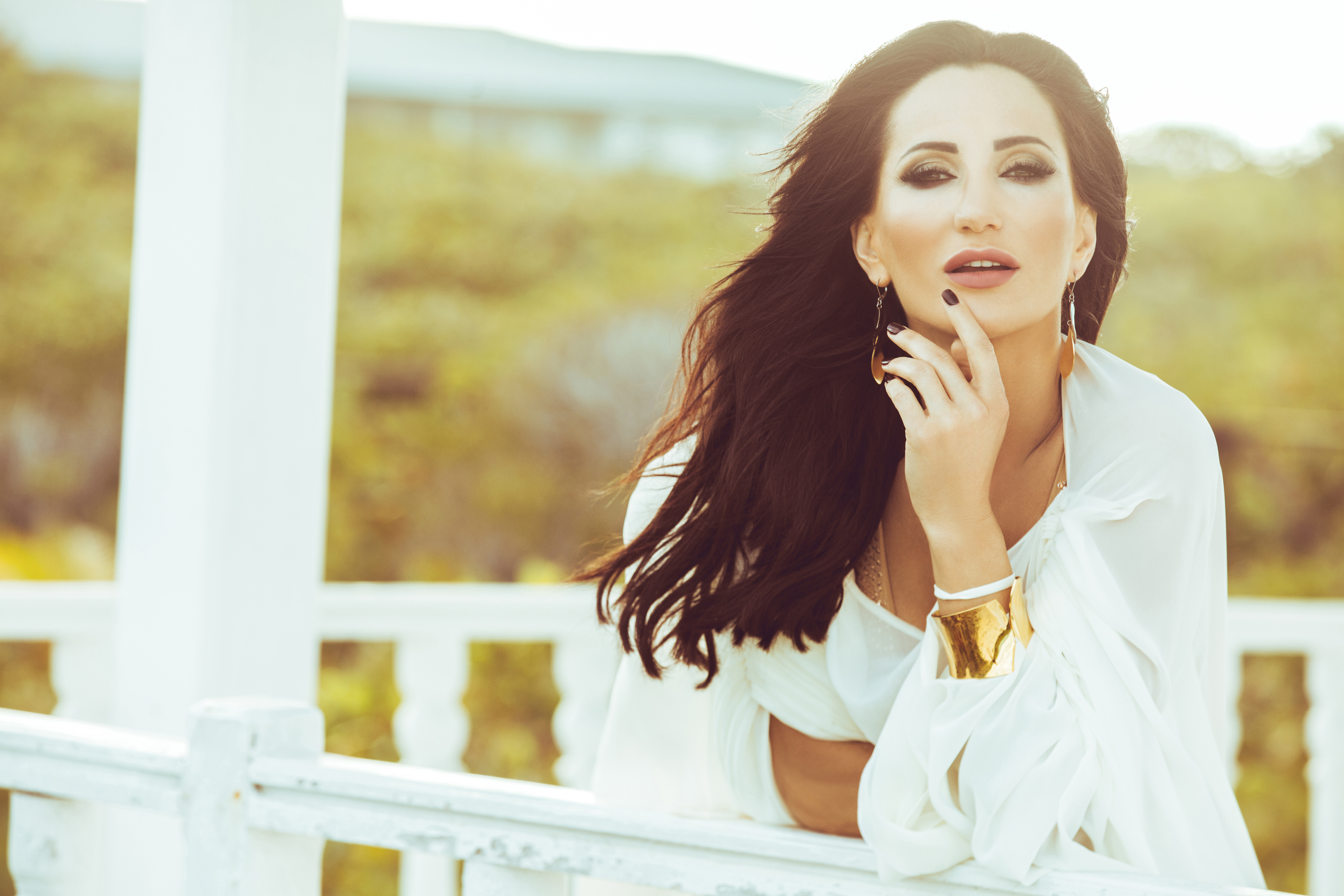
Justyna Steczkowska

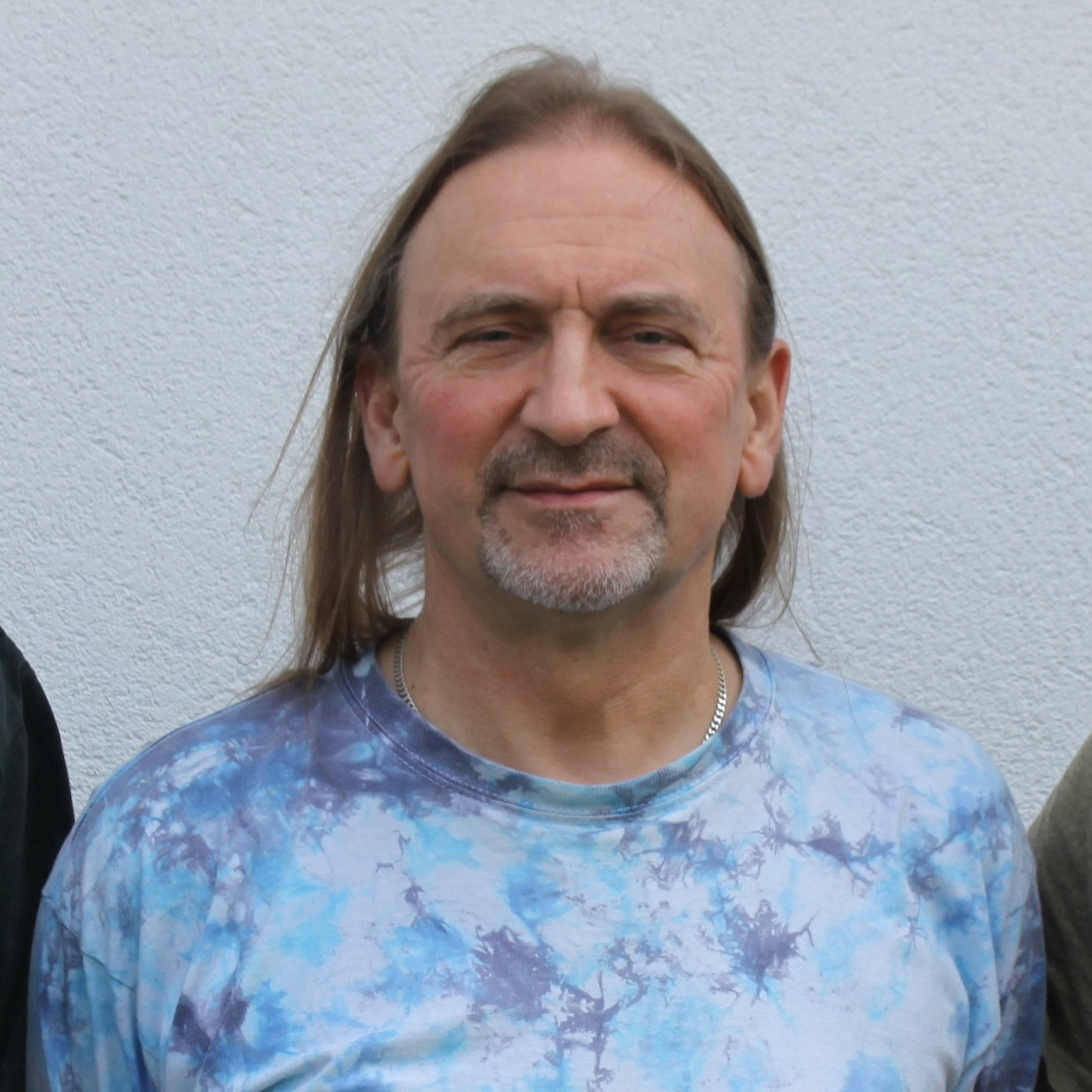
Marek Piekarczyk

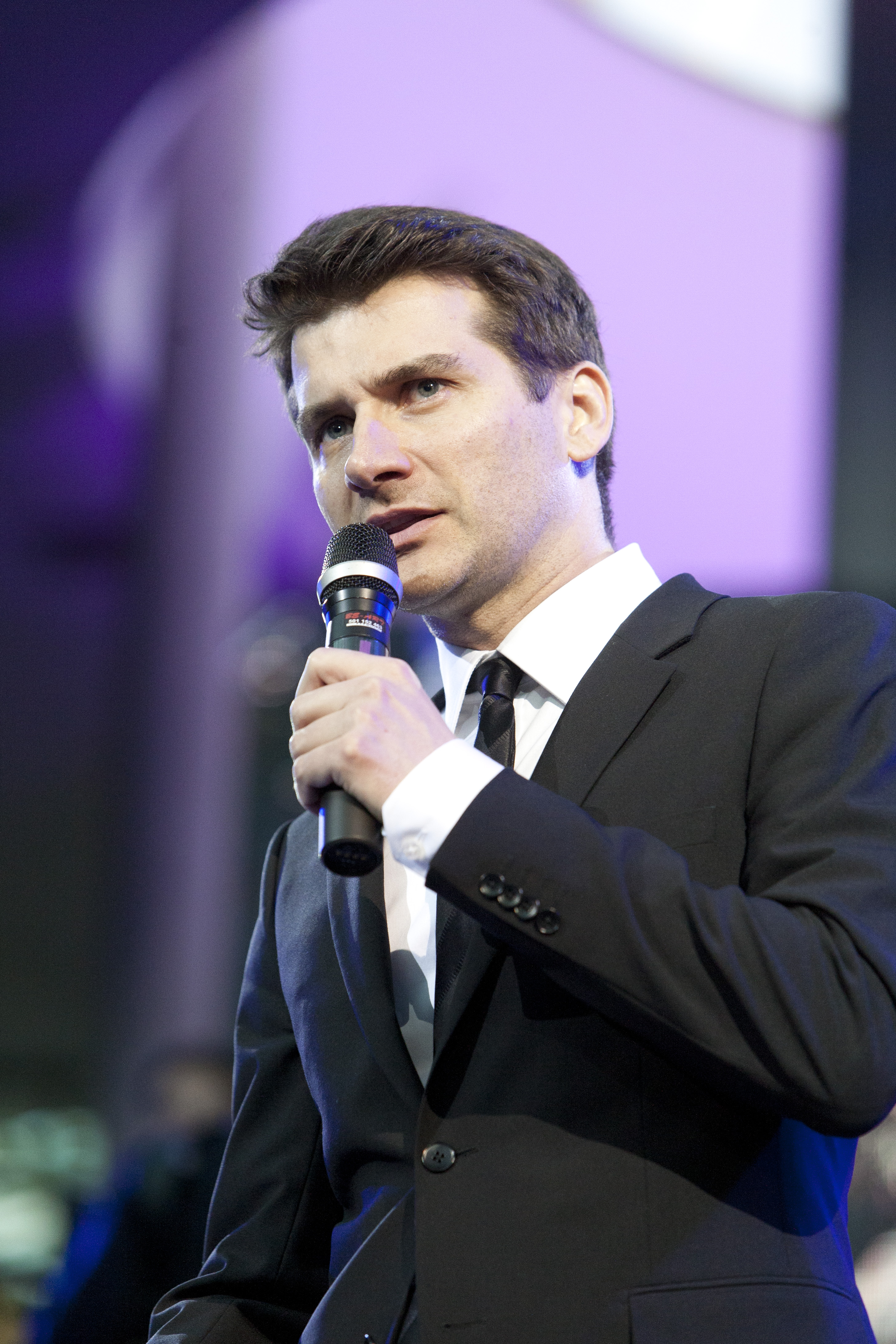
Tomasz Kammel

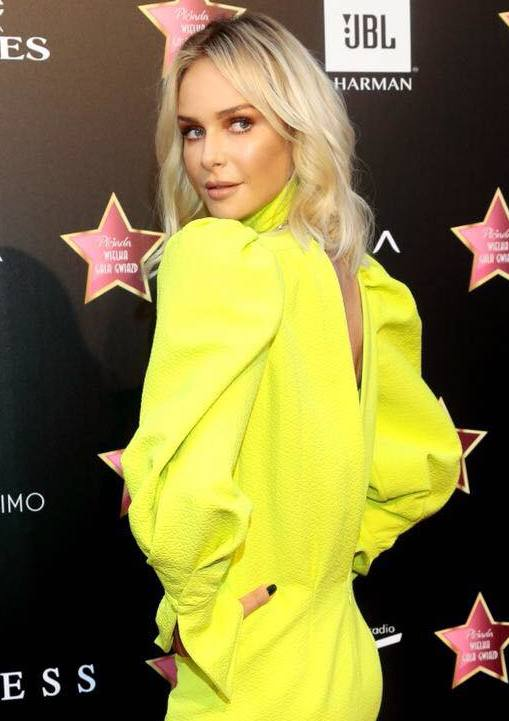
Magdalena Mielcarz

== Auditions ==
Auditions took place on 13, 14, 27 and 28 June and 5 July 2014 in Warsaw.

== Teams ==
Color key

- Winner
- Runner-up
- Third place
- Fourth place
- Eliminated in the Semifinals
- Eliminated in the Quarterfinals
- Eliminated in the Live round
- Eliminated in the Knockout round
- Artist was stolen by another coach (Name is strikethroughed)
- Eliminated in the Battle rounds
- Withdrew

Coaches	Top 52 artists				
Tomson & Baron					
Tomson & Baron	Natalia Lubrano	Justyna Janik	Marta 'Sarsa' Markiewicz	Natalia Podwin	Maciej Zieliński
Tomson & Baron	Hanna Hołek	Lena Osińska	Damian Michalski	Paulina Grochowska	Julia Węgrowicz
Tomson & Baron	~~Angelika Kłaczyńska~~	~~Natalia Bajak~~	Justyna Zuba	Agnieszka Szewczyk	~~Łukasz Szczepanik~~
Edyta Górniak					
Edyta Górniak	Przemysław Radziszewski	Iga Kozacka	Jerzy Grzechnik	Sandra Rusin	Marcin Molendowski
Edyta Górniak	Isabelle Mienandi	Wojciech Schmach	Ewelina Pobłocka	Joanna Kwaśnik	Anita Korzeniecka
Edyta Górniak	Krzysztof Rymszewicz	~~Marta 'Sarsa' Markiewicz~~	Paweł Barów	Marta Fedyniszyn	~~Alan Cyprysiak~~
Justyna Steczkowska					
Justyna Steczkowska	Aleksandra Nizio	Gracjan Kalandyk	Agnieszka Twardowska	Karol Dziedzic	Angelika Kłaczyńska
Justyna Steczkowska	Michał Dudkiewicz	Ewa Michrowska	Łukasz Szczepanik	~~Przemysław Radziszewski~~	Agni Caldarar
Justyna Steczkowska	~~Lena Osińska~~	Marta Wronka	~~Isabelle Mienandi~~	Sylwia Łyko	Dominik Dudzik
Marek Piekarczyk					
Marek Piekarczyk	Magdalena Paradziej	Żaneta Łabudzka	Tomasz Fridrych	Łukasz Szemraj	Natalia Bajak
Marek Piekarczyk	Monika Polak	Karolina Wojdat	Alan Cyprysiak	Monika Lewczuk	Katarzyna Kalinowska
Marek Piekarczyk	Adrianna Górka	Mariusz Dyba	Daniel Lipiec	Beata Just	Weronika Bochat
Stolen artists are italicized.

== Blind auditions ==
The blind auditions were taped from 14 to 17 August 2014.

Color keys

✔	Coach hit his/her "I WANT YOU" button
	Artist defaulted to this coach's team
	Artist elected to join this coach's team
	Artist eliminated with no coach pressing his or her "I WANT YOU" button

=== Episode 1 (September 6, 2014) ===
The coaches performed "Tysiące głosów", polish version of "One Thousand Voices", at the start of the show.

Order	Artist	Age	Hometown	Song	Coach's and contestant's choices			
Order	Artist	Age	Hometown	Song	Tomson & Baron	Edyta	Justyna	Marek
1	Maciej Zieliński	21	Brodnica	"Nic do stracenia"	✔	✔	✔	✔
2	Kamila Pieńkos	26	Wrocław	"Stop!"	—	—	—	—
3	Agnieszka Szewczyk	33	Rosochów	"I Try"	✔	—	—	✔
4	Łukasz Szemraj	32	N/A	"Bed of Roses"	—	—	—	✔
5	Jarosław Gołoś	20	N/A	"Ostatnia nocka"	—	—	—	—
6	Jerzy Grzechnik	34	Warsaw	"Stay with Me"	✔	✔	✔	—

=== Episode 2 (September 6, 2014) ===
Order	Artist	Age	Hometown	Song	Coach's and contestant's choices			
Order	Artist	Age	Hometown	Song	Tomson & Baron	Edyta	Justyna	Marek
1	Miłosz Semrau	21	N/A	"Cisza"	—	—	—	—
2	Marcin Molendowski	18	Gdynia	"I Need a Dollar"	✔	✔	✔	✔
3	Paulina Grochowska	23	N/A	"Turn Off the Light"	✔	✔	—	—
4	Ewelina Pobłocka	27	Luzino	"Don't Dream It's Over"	—	✔	—	—
5	Natalia Lubrano	34	Wrocław	"We Are the People"	✔	✔	✔	—
6	Justyna Bojczuk	19	Warsaw	"I Want You Back"	—	—	—	—
7	Karol Dziedzic	23	Małomice	"I Don't Want to Talk About It"	✔	✔	✔	✔

=== Episode 3 (September 13, 2014) ===
Order	Artist	Age	Hometown	Song	Coach's and contestant's choices			
Order	Artist	Age	Hometown	Song	Tomson & Baron	Edyta	Justyna	Marek
1	Sara Szumilas	17		"True Colors"	—	—	—	—
2	Michał Dudkiewicz	21		"Trójkąty i kwadraty"	✔	✔	✔	—
3	Lena Osińska	19		"You've Got the Love"	✔	—	✔	—
4	Paweł Barów	24		"Sing"	—	✔	✔	—
5	Joanna Kwaśnik	32	Rawicz	"Something's Got a Hold on Me"	—	✔	—	✔
6	Sandra Rusin	23	Kramsk	"Księżniczka"	—	✔	—	✔

=== Episode 4 (September 13, 2014) ===
Order	Artist	Age	Hometown	Song	Coach's and contestant's choices			
Order	Artist	Age	Hometown	Song	Tomson & Baron	Edyta	Justyna	Marek
1	Żaneta Łabudzka	24		"Wariatka tańczy"	—	—	—	✔
2	Monika Polak	26		"Footloose"	—	—	✔	✔
3	Wojciech Schmach	22	Lipiany	"Story of My Life"	—	✔	✔	—
4	Beata Kępa	19		"Walking on Broken Glass"	—	—	—	—
5	Justyna Janik	21	Żywiec	"Deeper"	✔	✔	✔	✔
6	Jacek Uchański	16		"Dla Ciebie"	—	—	—	—
7	Damian Michalski	26		"Every Breath You Take"	✔	✔	✔	✔

=== Episode 5 (September 20, 2014) ===
Order	Artist	Age	Hometown	Song	Coach's and contestant's choices			
Order	Artist	Age	Hometown	Song	Tomson & Baron	Edyta	Justyna	Marek
1	Magdalena Paradziej	23		"I'd Rather Go Blind"	✔	✔	✔	✔
2	Justyna Woźniak	34		"Addicted to You"	—	—	—	—
3	Łukasz Szczepanik	27	Kraków	"Mamma Knows Best"	✔	—	✔	✔
4	Agni Caldarar	19		"Stop!"	✔	—	✔	✔
5	Sebastian Machalski	23		"I'm Still Standing"	—	—	—	—
6	Beata Just	37	Białystok	"Winna"	—	✔	—	✔
7	Aleksandra Nizio	19	Aleksandrów	"Dzień za dniem"	—	—	✔	✔

=== Episode 6 (September 20, 2014) ===
Order	Artist	Age	Hometown	Song	Coach's and contestant's choices			
Order	Artist	Age	Hometown	Song	Tomson & Baron	Edyta	Justyna	Marek
1	Ewa Michrowska	29		"I Don't Want to Talk About It"	—	—	✔	✔
2	Jakub Niewałda	21		"Just the Two of Us"	—	—	—	—
3	Marta 'Sarsa' Markiewicz	26		"We Are the People"	—	✔	✔	✔
4	Tomasz Fridrych	23		"Californication"	—	—	—	✔
5	Isabelle Mienandi	30	Brazzaville, Republic of the Congo/Nysa	"Deeper"	—	—	✔	✔
6	Natalia Kapsa	23		"To co nam było"	—	—	—	—
7	Adrianna Górka	19	Racibórz	"Wariatka tańczy"	—	—	—	✔
8	Natalia Podwin	28		"Bust Your Windows"	✔	✔	✔	✔

=== Episode 7 (September 27, 2014) ===
Order	Artist	Age	Hometown	Song	Coach's and contestant's choices			
Order	Artist	Age	Hometown	Song	Tomson & Baron	Edyta	Justyna	Marek
1	Dominik Dudzik	31	Rudnik nad Sanem	"Wonderwall"	✔	—	✔	✔
2	Hanna Hołek	24		"Piechotą do lata"	✔	—	—	✔
3	Sylwia Łyko	22	Sarzyna	"Young and Beautiful"	—	—	✔	✔
4	Joanna Oleś	24		"[Sic!]"	—	—	—	—
5	Katarzyna Kalinowska	17		"Piece of My Heart"	—	✔	—	✔
6	Mariusz Dyba	25		"Wrecking Ball"	✔	✔	—	✔
7	Angelika Kłaczyńska	27	Łódź	"Superstition"	✔	✔	✔	✔

=== Episode 8 (September 27, 2014) ===
Order	Artist	Age	Hometown	Song	Coach's and contestant's choices			
Order	Artist	Age	Hometown	Song	Tomson & Baron	Edyta	Justyna	Marek
1	Daniel Lipiec	21		"My Girl"	—	—	—	✔
2	Aleksandra Usiądek-Szajkowska	25		"Ulubiona rzecz"	—	—	—	—
3	Anita Korzeniecka	27	Barczewo	"Footloose"	—	✔	—	✔
4	Michalina Manios	25	Szadek	"Is This Love"	—	—	—	—
5	Krzysztof Rymszewicz	27	Człopa	"Don't Dream It's Over"	—	✔	—	—
6	Joliet Jake Blues	64	Nottingham, United Kingdom	"She's a Lady"	—	—	—	—
7	Julia Węgrowicz	21		"Domino"	✔	—	✔	✔
8	Gracjan Kalandyk	21	Elbląg	"Give Me Love"	✔	✔	✔	✔

=== Episode 9 (October 4, 2014) ===
Order	Artist	Age	Hometown	Song	Coach's and contestant's choices			
Order	Artist	Age	Hometown	Song	Tomson & Baron	Edyta	Justyna	Marek
1	Iga Kozacka	24	Kłobuck	"River Deep – Mountain High"	✔	✔	—	✔
2	Dawid Grzybek	21	N/A	"Pod papugami"	—	—	—	—
3	Justyna Zuba	20	Horyniec	"One and Only"	✔	—	✔	✔
4	Marta Fedyniszyn	24	Piekary Śląskie	"I'd Rather Go Blind"	—	✔	—	✔
5	Mikołaj Król	21	Łodygowice	"Wkręceni"	—	—	—	—
6	Marta Wronka	25	N/A	"Right to Be Wrong"	✔	—	✔	✔
7	Monika Lewczuk	26	Płock	"Rysa na szkle"	—	—	—	✔
8	Agnieszka Twardowska	21	Strzelno	"Stay with Me"	✔	✔	✔	✔

=== Episode 10 (October 4, 2014) ===
Order	Artist	Age	Hometown	Song	Coach's and contestant's choices			
Order	Artist	Age	Hometown	Song	Tomson & Baron	Edyta	Justyna	Marek
1	Weronika Bochat	23	N/A	"Flashdance... What a Feeling"	—	—	✔	✔
2	Inez Bodio	19	Wrocław	"Psalm stojących w kolejce"	—	—	—	—
3	Przemysław Radziszewski	33	Turze	"Tell Him"	—	—	✔	—
4	Maciej Olechnowicz	32	N/A	"Jump"	—	—	—	—
5	Karolina Wojdat	16	Radom	"Rome Wasn't Built in a Day"	—	—	—	✔
6	Sylwia Dynek	28	Warsaw	"Where Is the Love?"	—	—	—	—
7	Natalia Bajak	22	N/A	"You Got the Love"	✔	✔	✔	✔
8	Alan Cyprysiak	21	Płońsk	"Just the Two of Us"	—	✔	—	✔

== The Battle rounds ==
The Battle rounds will be taped from 16 to 18 September 2014.

Color keys

Artist won the Battle and advances to the Knockouts
Artist lost the Battle but was stolen by another coach and advances to the Knockouts
Artist lost the Battle and was eliminated

=== Episode 11 (October 11, 2014) ===
Coach	Order	Winner	Song	Loser	'Steal' result			
Coach	Order	Winner	Song	Loser	Tomson & Baron	Edyta	Justyna	Marek
Justyna Steczkowska	1	Michał Dudkiewicz	"Counting Stars"	Dominik Dudzik	—	—	—	—
Marek Piekarczyk	2	Żaneta Łabudzka	"O mnie się nie martw"	Weronika Bochat	—	—	—	—
Tomson & Baron	3	Maciej Zieliński	"It's Probably Me"	Łukasz Szczepanik	—	—	✔	—
Edyta Górniak	4	Marcin Molendowski	"The Way You Make Me Feel"	Alan Cyprysiak	✔	—	✔	✔
Tomson & Baron	5	Damian Michalski	"Help!"	Agnieszka Szewczyk	—	—	—	—
Tomson & Baron	5	Damian Michalski	"Help!"	Justyna Zuba	—	—	—	—
Marek Piekarczyk	6	Magdalena Paradziej	"(I Can't Get No) Satisfaction"	Beata Just	—	—	—	—
Edyta Górniak	7	Sandra Rusin	"Dziesięć przykazań"	Marta Fedyniszyn	—	—	—	—
Justyna Steczkowska	8	Aleksandra Nizio	"We Found Love"	Sylwia Łyko	—	—	—	—
Justyna Steczkowska	8	Aleksandra Nizio	"We Found Love"	Isabelle Mienandi	✔	✔	—	—

=== Episode 12 (October 18, 2014) ===
Coach	Order	Winner	Song	Loser	'Steal' result			
Coach	Order	Winner	Song	Loser	Tomson & Baron	Edyta	Justyna	Marek
Edyta Górniak	1	Wojciech Schmach	"Wierzę w lepszy świat"	Paweł Barów	—	—	—	—
Tomson & Baron	2	Justyna Janik	"Lady Marmalade"	Natalia Bajak	—	✔	—	✔
Marek Piekarczyk	3	Monika Polak	"Jesień idzie przez park"	Daniel Lipiec	—	—	—	—
Edyta Górniak	4	Jerzy Grzechnik	"Beneath Your Beautiful"	Marta 'Sarsa' Markiewicz	✔	—	—	—
Justyna Steczkowska	5	Agnieszka Twardowska	"Nie żałuję"	Marta Wronka	—	—	—	—
Marek Piekarczyk	6	Tomasz Fridrych	"Wszystko ma swój czas"	Mariusz Dyba	—	—	—	—
Justyna Steczkowska	7	Gracjan Kalandyk	"Say Something"	Lena Osińska	✔	✔	—	✔
Tomson & Baron	8	Natalia Lubrano	"Chandelier"	Angelika Kłaczyńska	—	—	✔	✔

=== Episode 13 (October 25, 2014) ===
Coach	Order	Winner	Song	Loser	'Steal' result			
Coach	Order	Winner	Song	Loser	Tomson & Baron	Edyta	Justyna	Marek
Marek Piekarczyk	1	Karolina Wojdat	"Dni, których nie znamy"	Adrianna Górka	—	—	—	—
Edyta Górniak	2	Ewelina Pobłocka	"Zaopiekuj się mną"	Krzysztof Rymszewicz	—	—	—	—
Justyna Steczkowska	3	Ewa Michrowska	"Cicho"	Agni Caldarar	—	—	—	—
Marek Piekarczyk	4	Łukasz Szemraj	"La La La"	Katarzyna Kalinowska	—	—	—	—
Marek Piekarczyk	4	Łukasz Szemraj	"La La La"	Monika Lewczuk	—	—	—	—
Tomson & Baron	5	Hanna Hołek	"We Are Family"	Julia Węgrowicz	—	—	—	—
Edyta Górniak	6	Iga Kozacka	"E.T."	Anita Korzeniecka	—	—	—	—
Edyta Górniak	6	Iga Kozacka	"E.T."	Joanna Kwaśnik	—	—	—	—
Justyna Steczkowska	7	Karol Dziedzic	"(Everything I Do) I Do It for You"	Przemysław Radziszewski	—	✔	—	—
Tomson & Baron	8	Natalia Podwin	"Rather Be"	Paulina Grochowska	—	—	—	—

== The Knockouts ==
Before each knockout round the coach chooses two artists from their team to get a "fast pass" to the live shows, the remaining six artists from that team are then split up into two groups of three. At the end of each knockout round the coach then decides out of the three artists who wins, and therefore makes up their four artists to take to the live shows.

=== Episode 14 (November 8, 2014) ===
Color keys

Artist won the Knockouts and advances to the Live shows
Artist lost the Knockouts and was eliminated

Order	Coach	Song	Winner	Loser	Song
1	Edyta Górniak	"I Want You Back"	Iga Kozacka	Ewelina Pobłocka	"Ironic"
1	Edyta Górniak	"I Want You Back"	Iga Kozacka	Wojciech Schmach	"Trójkąty i kwadraty"
2	Edyta Górniak	"Young and Beautiful"	Sandra Rusin	Isabelle Mienandi	"Roar"
2	Edyta Górniak	"Young and Beautiful"	Sandra Rusin	Marcin Molendowski	"Treasure"
3	Marek Piekarczyk	"Have You Ever Seen the Rain?"	Tomasz Fridrych	Alan Cyprysiak	"Here Comes the Sun"
3	Marek Piekarczyk	"Have You Ever Seen the Rain?"	Tomasz Fridrych	Karolina Wojdat	"Pocałuj noc"
4	Marek Piekarczyk	"Something's Got a Hold on Me"	Magdalena Paradziej	Monika Polak	"Torn"
4	Marek Piekarczyk	"Something's Got a Hold on Me"	Magdalena Paradziej	Natalia Bajak	"Just Like a Pill"
5	Tomson & Baron	"Mamma Knows Best"	Justyna Janik	Damian Michalski	"Ale wkoło jest wesoło"
5	Tomson & Baron	"Mamma Knows Best"	Justyna Janik	Lena Osińska	"Don't Dream It's Over"
6	Tomson & Baron	"Rome Wasn't Built in a Day"	Marta Sarsa Markiewicz	Hanna Hołek	"Wieża radości, wieża samotności"
6	Tomson & Baron	"Rome Wasn't Built in a Day"	Marta Sarsa Markiewicz	Maciej Zieliński	"To co dobre, to co lepsze"
7	Justyna Steczkowska	"One and Only"	Aleksandra Nizio	Łukasz Szczepanik	"Superstition"
7	Justyna Steczkowska	"One and Only"	Aleksandra Nizio	Ewa Michrowska	"Rysa na szkle"
8	Justyna Steczkowska	"Songbird"	Agnieszka Twardowska	Michał Dudkiewicz	"Right to Be Wrong"
8	Justyna Steczkowska	"Songbird"	Agnieszka Twardowska	Angelika Kłaczyńska	"Ta sama chwila"

== Live Shows ==
Color keys

Artist was saved by Public's vote
Artist was saved by his/her coach
Artist was eliminated

=== Episode 15 (November 15, 2014) ===
Order	Coach	Artist	Song	Result
1	Justyna Steczkowska	Gracjan Kalandyk	"Have You Ever Really Loved a Woman?"	Justyna's choice
2	Justyna Steczkowska	Agnieszka Twardowska	"Run to You"	Public's vote
3	Justyna Steczkowska	Aleksandra Nizio	"Gdzie ten, który powie mi"	Public's vote
4	Justyna Steczkowska	Karol Dziedzic	"Eli lama sabachtani"	Eliminated
5	Marek Piekarczyk	Łukasz Szemraj	"Słońce moje"	Eliminated
6	Marek Piekarczyk	Magdalena Paradziej	"Powiedz stary, gdzieś ty był"	Public's vote
7	Marek Piekarczyk	Tomasz Fridrych	"Jezu jak się cieszę"	Public's vote
8	Marek Piekarczyk	Żaneta Łabudzka	"Szklanka wody"	Marek's choice
9	Edyta Górniak	Jerzy Grzechnik	"Forever Young"	Public's vote
10	Edyta Górniak	Iga Kozacka	"Ain't Nobody"	Edyta's choice
11	Edyta Górniak	Sandra Rusin	"Because of You"	Eliminated
12	Edyta Górniak	Przemysław Radziszewski	"Umbrella"	Public's vote
13	Tomson & Baron	Natalia Podwin	"Changing"	Eliminated
14	Tomson & Baron	Marta 'Sarsa' Markiewicz	"Royals"	Public's vote
15	Tomson & Baron	Justyna Janik	"I Kissed a Girl"	Tomson & Baron's choice
16	Tomson & Baron	Natalia Lubrano	"Brzydcy"	Public's vote

=== Episode 16 (November 22, 2014) ===
Order	Coach	Artist	Song	Result
1	Marek Piekarczyk	Magdalena Paradziej	"Aleja gwiazd"	Public's vote
2	Marek Piekarczyk	Tomasz Fridrych	"Summer of '69"	Eliminated
3	Marek Piekarczyk	Żaneta Łabudzka	"Man! I Feel Like a Woman!"	Marek's choice
4	Edyta Górniak	Jerzy Grzechnik	"Nie pytaj o Polskę"	Eliminated
5	Edyta Górniak	Iga Kozacka	"Part-Time Lover"	Edyta's choice
6	Edyta Górniak	Przemysław Radziszewski	"Ostatni raz zatańczysz ze mną"	Public's vote
7	Tomson & Baron	Natalia Lubrano	"Love Runs Out"	Tomson & Baron's choice
8	Tomson & Baron	Marta 'Sarsa' Markiewicz	"Glory Box"	Public's vote
9	Tomson & Baron	Justyna Janik	"Why Don't You Love Me"	Eliminated
10	Justyna Steczkowska	Agnieszka Twardowska	"Strong Enough"	Eliminated
11	Justyna Steczkowska	Gracjan Kalandyk	"Kołysanka dla nieznajomej"	Justyna's choice
12	Justyna Steczkowska	Aleksandra Nizio	"Set Fire to the Rain"	Public's vote

=== Episode 17 (November 29, 2014) ===
With the eliminations of Natalia Lubrano and Justyna Janik, Tomson & Baron had no more artists on their team, which marks the only season (so far) where a coach did not have an artist in the finale. With the advancement of Aleksandra Nizio and Gracjan Kalandyk, Steczkowska became the only coach that got more than one artist in the finale.

Cross-Battle	Order	Coach	Artist	Song	Order	Duet Song	Result	
1	1	Justyna Steczkowska	Gracjan Kalandyk	"Beautiful Day"	3	"Bohema"	69,22 %	Advanced to the Final
1	2	Marek Piekarczyk	Żaneta Łabudzka	"Kiedy Powiem Sobie Dość"	3	"Bohema"	30,78 %	Eliminated
2	4	Tomson & Baron	Justyna Janik	"Hurt"	6	"Let's Dance"	46,00 %	Eliminated
2	5	Edyta Górniak	Przemysław Radziszewski	"Tell Him"	6	"Let's Dance"	54,00 %	Advanced to the Final
3	7	Justyna Steczkowska	Aleksandra Nizio	"Stronger"	9	"Biała Armia"	82,10 %	Advanced to the Final
3	8	Edyta Górniak	Iga Kozacka	"Na Dwa"	9	"Biała Armia"	17,90 %	Eliminated
4	10	Tomson i Baron	Natalia Lubrano	"Milord"	12	"Kiss"	48,07 %	Eliminated
4	11	Marek Piekarczyk	Magdalena Paradziej	"I Will Survive"	12	"Kiss"	51,93 %	Advanced to the Final

=== Final (December 6, 2014) ===
Coach	Artist	Order	Solo song	Order	Duet 1	Duet with	Order	Duet 2	Duet with	Order	Finalist's song	Result
Marek Piekarczyk	Magdalena Paradziej	3	"Unchain my heart"	7	"Czerwone Korale"	Halina Mlynkova	9	"Nic nie może przecież wiecznie trwać"	Monika Urlik	Already eliminated		Fourth place
Edyta Górniak	Przemysław Radziszewski	6	"One of a Kind"	2	"O niebo lepiej"	Mietek Szcześniak	12	„The Winner Takes I All”	Mateusz Ziółko	14	"It's a beautiful day"	Runner-up
Justyna Steczkowska	Aleksandra Nizio	1	"Czas zapomnieć"	5	"Wielka woda"	Maryla Rodowicz	11	"Opowieść"	Natalia Sikora	13	"Boso"	Winner
Justyna Steczkowska	Gracjan Kalandyk	8	"The A team"	4	"Thank you very much"	Margaret	10	„It's My Life”	Juan Carlos Cano	Already eliminated		Third place

Non-competition performances
Order	Performers	Song
1	Participants 5th edition	"Shake it off"

== Results summary of live shows ==
Color keys
Artist's info

- Artist from Team Tomson & Baron
- Artist from Team Edyta
- Artist from Team Justyna
- Artist from Team Marek

Result details

- Artist was proclaimed as winner
- Artist was proclaimed as runner-up
- Artist was proclaimed as third place
- Artist was proclaimed as fourth place
- Artist advanced to the finals
- Artist was saved by his/her coach
- Artist was saved by the public
- Artist received the fewest of the public's vote and was eliminated

Live show results per week
Artist	Week 1	Week 2	Week 3	Final
Aleksandra Nizio	Safe	Safe	Advanced	Winner
Przemysław Radziszewski	Safe	Safe	Advanced	Runner-up
Gracjan Kalandyk	Safe	Safe	Advanced	3rd place
Magdalena Paradziej	Safe	Safe	Advanced	4th place
Iga Kozacka	Safe	Safe	Eliminated	Eliminated (Week 3)
Justyna Janik	Safe	Eliminated^{1}	Eliminated	Eliminated (Week 3)
Natalia Lubrano	Safe	Safe	Eliminated	Eliminated (Week 3)
Żaneta Łabudzka	Safe	Safe	Eliminated	Eliminated (Week 3)
Marta 'Sarsa' Markiewicz	Safe	Safe	Withdrew	
Agnieszka Twardowska	Safe	Eliminated	Eliminated (Week 2)	
Jerzy Grzechnik	Safe	Eliminated	Eliminated (Week 2)	
Tomasz Fridrych	Safe	Eliminated	Eliminated (Week 2)	
Karol Dziedzic	Eliminated	Eliminated (Week 1)		
Łukasz Szemraj	Eliminated	Eliminated (Week 1)		
Natalia Podwin	Eliminated	Eliminated (Week 1)		
Sandra Rusin	Eliminated	Eliminated (Week 1)		

^1 Marta 'Sarsa' Markiewicz had to withdraw due to health problems. Justyna Janik took her place in the semifinal.

^2 Marek tried to steal the participants despite the lack of vacancies on his team.

== Ratings ==
Summary of episode ratings
Episode	Date	Duration (minutes)^1	Official rating (millions)	Share (%)	Share 16-49 (%)
Blind Auditions 1&2	6 September	120	1 345 625	15,30%	13,81%
Blind Auditions 3&4	13 September	120	1 655 288		
Blind Auditions 5&6	20 September	120	1 767 017		
Blind Auditions 7&8	27 September	120	2 045 192		
Blind Auditions 9&10	4 October	120	1 965 230		
Battle round 1	11 October	130	1 658 714		
Battle round 2	18 October	130	2 191 092		
Battle round 3	25 October	130	2 071 289		
Knockout 1	8 November				
Live 1	15 November				
Live 2	22 November				
Live 3	29 November				
Final	6 December				
