= Zapomnij mi =

Studio album by Sarsa
- Released: 28 August 2015
- Genre: Electropop; indie pop
- Length: 41:33
- Language: Polish; English
- Label: Universal Music Polska
- Producer: Marta Markiewicz; Tomasz Konfederak

Sarsa chronology
Zapomnij mi (2015)	Piorópusze (2017)

Singles from Zapomnij mi
- 1. "Naucz mnie" Released: 30 April 2015; 2. "Indiana" Released: 14 August 2015; 3. "Zapomnij mi" Released: 7 December 2015; 4. "Feel No Fear" Released: 16 April 2016

Zapomnij mi (English: Forgive me) is the debut studio album by Polish singer Sarsa. The album was released on 28 August 2015 through Universal Music Polska. It has peaked at number-two on the Polish albums chart and has been certified platinum.

== Singles ==
"Naucz mnie" was released as the album's lead single on 30 April 2015. The song became a commercial success in Poland, reaching number-one on the airplay and new airplay charts in addition to being certified diamond. It also won Biggest Hit at the 2015 Eska Music Awards.

"Indiana" was released as the second single on 14 August. The song peaked at number-one on the Polish new airplay chart, while it became a top 20 single on the airplay chart. It has since been certified gold. "Zapomnij mi" was released as the third single from the album on 7 December. It reached number-one on the new airplay chart and has become a top ten hit on the airplay chart. The album's fourth and final single, "Feel No Fear", was released on 14 April 2016.

== Track listing ==
All tracks are written by Marta Markiewicz.

No.	Title	Producer(s)	Length
1.	"Indiana"	Markiewicz; Yk Koi	3:16
2.	"Dogonię nas"	Joakim Buddee; Linnéa Gustafsson; Markiewicz	3:28
3.	"Zapomnij mi"	Buddee; Gustafsson; Markiewicz	3:37
4.	"Pozwól odejść"	Markiewicz; Yk Koi	3:32
5.	"Naucz mnie"	Bruce Fielder; Markiewicz	3:17
6.	"Ona nie jest mną"	Markiewicz	3:55
7.	"Feel No Fear"	Szymon Kozłowski; Markiewicz; Bartosz Wielgosz	3:51
8.	"Chill"	Markiewicz	4:01
9.	"Dumb Love"	Markiewicz; Melchior	4:00
10.	"23 takie lata"	Tomasz Konfederak; Markiewicz; Wielgosz	3:15
11.	"Brown Eyes"	Konfederak; Markiewicz	5:16
Total length:			41:33

== Charts and certifications ==
=== Weekly charts ===
Chart (2015)	Peak position
Polish Albums (ZPAV)	2

=== Certifications ===
Region	Certification	Certified units/sales
Poland (ZPAV)	Platinum	30,000^{‡}
^{‡} Sales+streaming figures based on certification alone.

== Release history ==
Region	Date	Label
Australia	28 August 2015	Universal Music Polska
Europe	28 August 2015	Universal Music Polska
New Zealand	28 August 2015	Universal Music Polska
