= SS Indiana =

SS Indiana may refer to:

- SS Indiana (1848), a steamship built in 1848 by F.M. Keating
- SS Indiana (1873), a passenger steamship launched in 1873 by William Cramp & Sons for the American Line
- SS Indiana (1905), a passenger ship launched by Societa Esercizio Bacini in 1905 for Lloyd Italiano

== See also ==
- USS Indiana
