= International Standard Number =

International Standard Number may refer to:

- International Standard Book Number, a unique numeric commercial book identifier based upon the 9-digit Standard Book Numbering code
- International Standard Recording Code, a unique twelve-character alphanumeric identifier for audio and video recordings
- International Standard Serial Number, a unique eight-digit number used to identify a print or electronic periodical publication
- International Standard Name Identifier, a unique sixteen-digit number used to identify the public identities of contributors to media content
- International Standard Music Number, a thirteen-character alphanumeric identifier for printed music
- International Standard Audiovisual Number, a unique identifier for audiovisual works and related versions
