= ITAD Subscriber Numbers =

ITAD Subscriber Numbers, or ISNs, provide a way of interconnecting VOIP PBXs by adding a number to the internal phone number of the target phone. The ITAD number is added to the target phone number preceded by an asterisk. Therefore, only numbers and symbols which appear on a telephone keypad will be used.
