= Retta T. Matthews =

American artist

Retta Therese Matthews
- Born: April 7, 1856; Arlington, Indiana
- Died: 1899 (aged 42–43); Indiana
- Known for: Painting, Sculpture, Educator

Retta Therese Matthews (1856 – 1899) was an American painter and sculptor.

== Biography ==
Matthews was born on April 7, 1856, in Arlington, Indiana. She attended the Cincinnati Museum Association Art School from 1881 to 1884. She then taught art classes in the San Antonio, Texas public schools for several years, before moving to Paris to continue her art studies with M. Ingelbert. After becoming ill she returned to Indiana in the early 1890s.

She exhibited her work in the Indiana State Building and the Woman's Building at the 1893 World's Columbian Exposition in Chicago, Illinois. Matthews also exhibited her work at the Ohio State Fair, winning first prize in 1894 for one of her pieces.

Matthews died in February 1899 in Indiana.

== Legacy ==
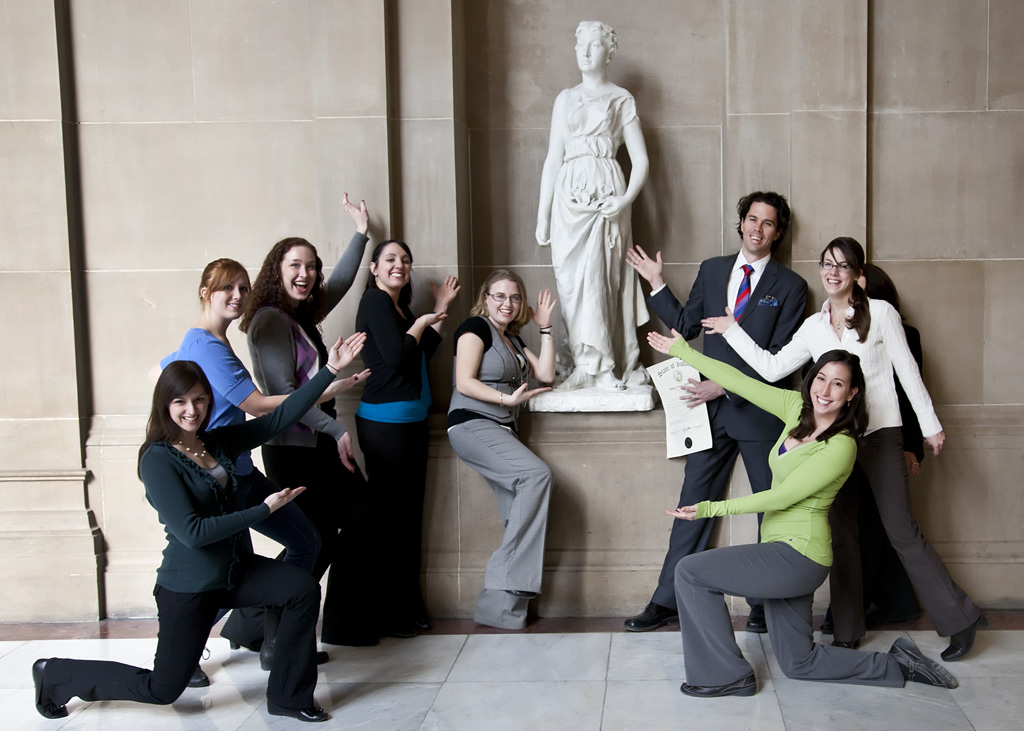
Indiana (c.1893), Indiana Statehouse Public Art Collection

Matthews' statue of "Indiana" created for the 1893 World's Exposition is now located in the Indiana Statehouse in Indianapolis, Indiana.
