= Sarsa (singer) =

Pop musician from Poland

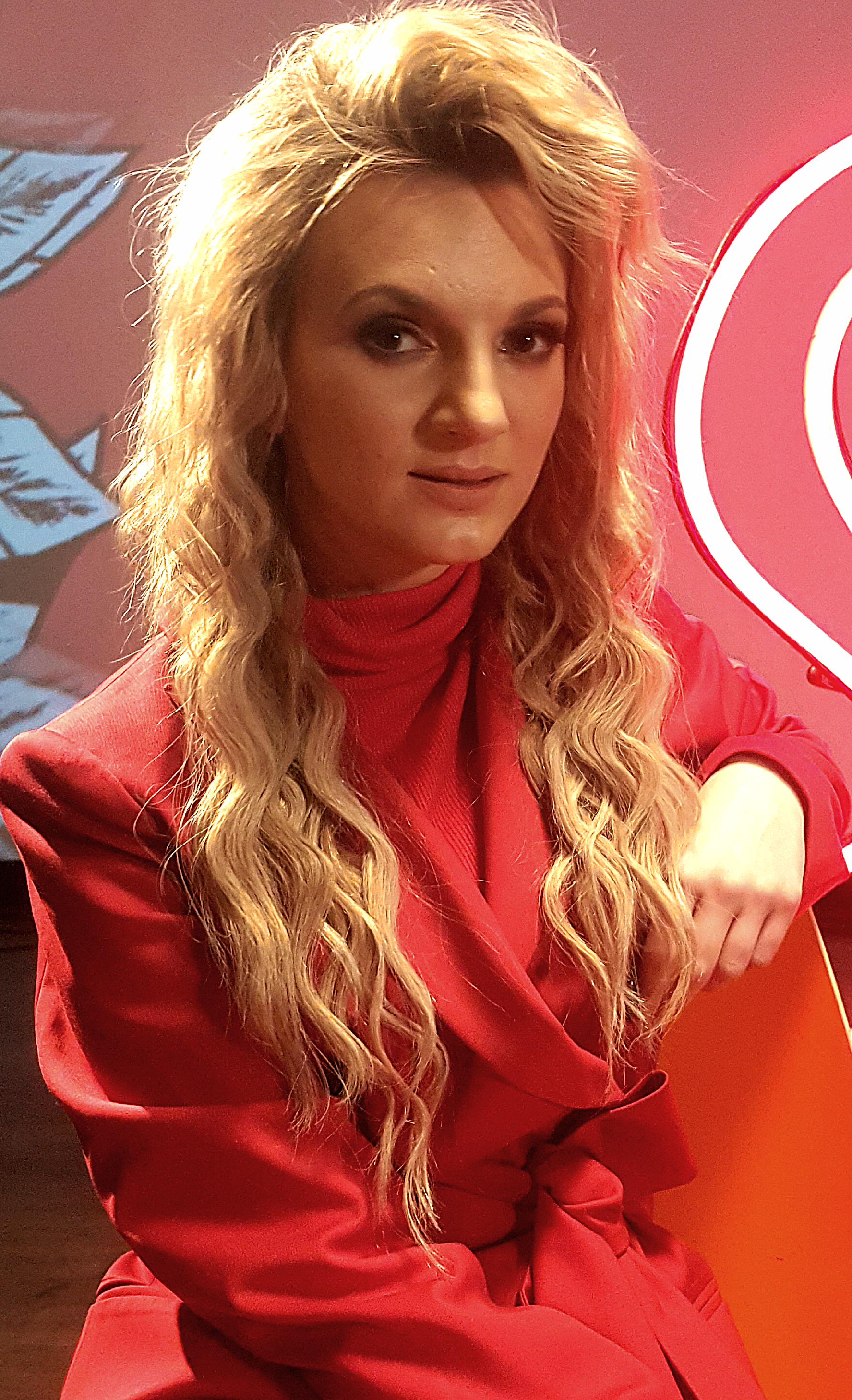
- Sarsa in 2019

Background information
- Also known as: Sarsa Markiewicz
- Born: Marta Markiewicz; 13 June 1989 (age 37); Słupsk, Poland
- Genres: Electropop; indie pop
- Occupations: Singer; songwriter; record producer; composer
- Instruments: Vocals; guitar; ukulele; piano
- Years active: 2010–present
- Label: Universal Music Polska
- Website: SARSA on Instagram

Logo
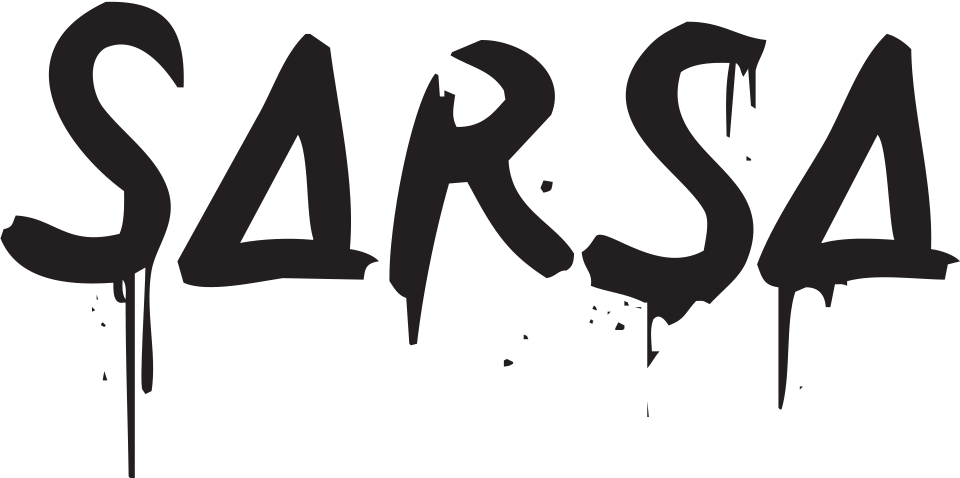

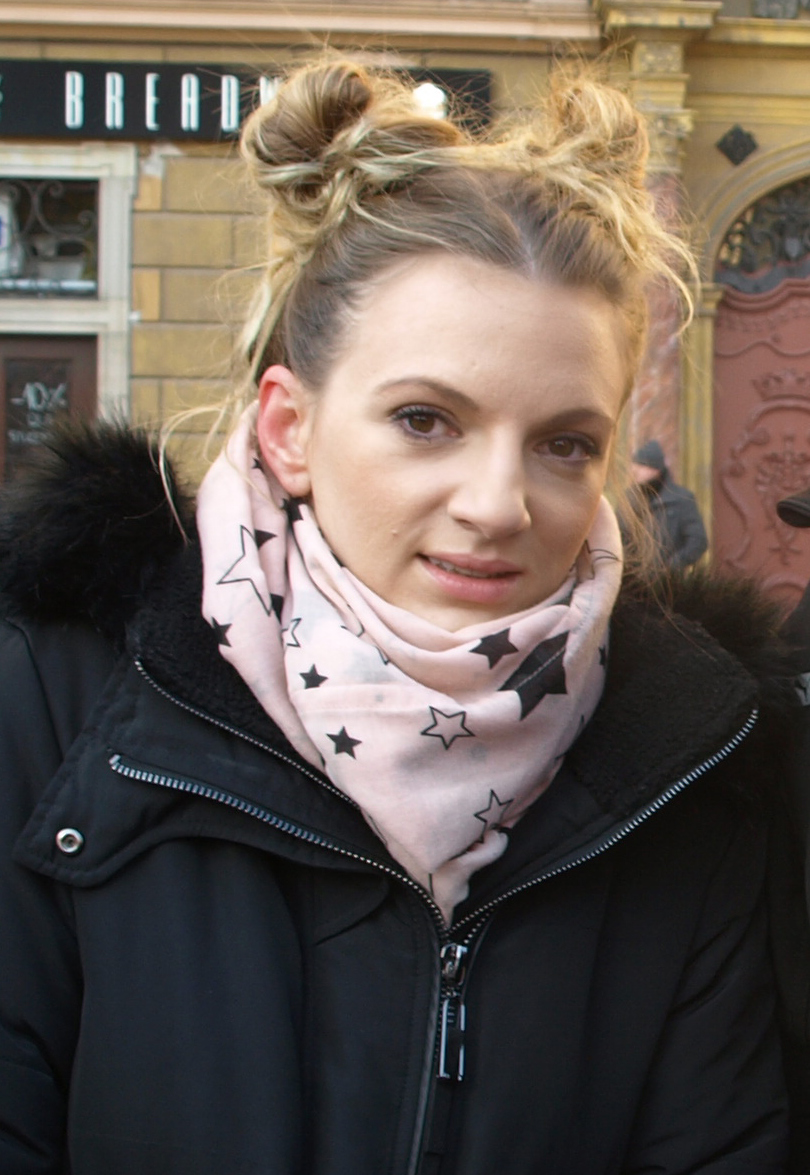
Sarsa (2015)

Marta Markiewicz (born 13 June 1989), better known as Sarsa or Sarsa Markiewicz, is a Polish singer, songwriter, and record producer. She first achieved mainstream attention due to her 2015 single "Naucz mnie" (Teach me), which occupied the number-one position on the Polish singles chart for six consecutive weeks, and was certified diamond by the Polish Society of the Phonographic Industry (ZPAV). Her debut studio album Zapomnij mi was released on 28 August 2015.

== Life and career ==
=== Early career ===
Sarsa was born on 13 June 1988 as Marta Markiewicz in Słupsk. She attended the Pomeranian Academy in Słupsk, majoring in art education. Sarsa first broke into the music industry in 2011, while participating in the second season of Must Be the Music. Three years later, she took part in the Polish version of The X Factor.

In 2014, she participated in the fifth season of The Voice of Poland. She was originally a member of Team Edyta Górniak, but was later stolen by Team Tomson & Baron. In the quarterfinals, she withdrew from the competition due to health issues.

=== 2015–2016: Breakthrough and Zapomnij mi ===
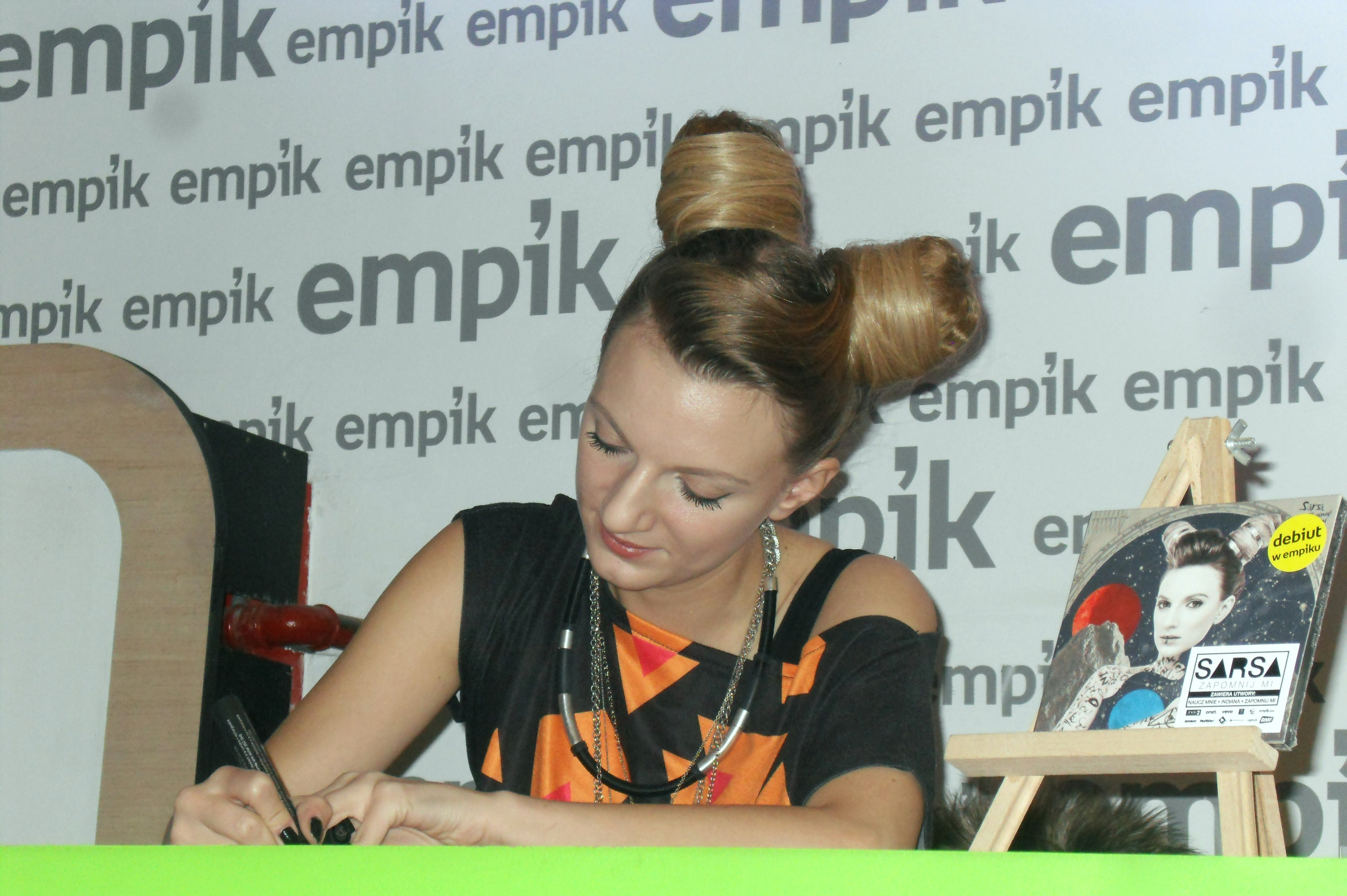
Sarsa signing autographs in Gdańsk in 2015.

After being signed to Universal Music Polska, Sarsa released her debut single "Naucz mnie" (Teach me) on 30 April 2015. The official music video was released two weeks later. The song peaked at number-one on the Polish singles chart and stayed there for six weeks. From 17–18 July, she represented Poland at the Baltic Song Contest, performing "Naucz mnie" and "Indiana". She won the audience award.

On 14 August, she released her second single "Indiana". The song peaked at number-one on the Polish new hits chart and in the top twenty of the Polish singles chart. Two weeks later, her debut studio album Zapomnij mi (Forget me) was released. The album peaked at number-two on the Polish albums chart. She was nominated for Best Polish Act at the 2015 MTV Europe Music Awards, but lost to Margaret. "Zapomnij mi" was released as the album's third single on 7 December.

=== 2016–present: Pióropusze ===
In 2016, Sarsa revealed that her second album would be released in 2017. She's working with producer Steve Manowski, rapper VNM and other producers on the album. The first single from the new album, "Bronię się", was released on 10 March 2017. Sarsa will set new music video for her second official single "Volta" on 20 May.

== Discography ==
=== Studio albums ===
Album title	Album details	Peak chart positions	Sales	Certifications
Album title	Album details	POL	Sales	Certifications
Zapomnij mi	Released: 28 August 2015; Label: Universal Music Polska; Formats: CD, digital download	2	POL: 30,000	POL: Platinum
Pióropusze	Released: 26 May 2017; Label: Universal Music Polska; Formats: CD, digital download	19	POL: 15,000	POL: Gold
Zakryj	Released: 24 May 2019; Label: Universal Music Polska; Formats: CD, digital download	4	POL: 15,000	POL: Gold

=== Singles ===
Title	Year	Peak chart positions		Certifications	Album
Title	Year	POL	POL New	Certifications	Album
"Naucz mnie"	2015	1	1	POL: Diamond	Zapomnij mi
"Indiana"	2015	12	1	POL: Platinum	Zapomnij mi
"Zapomnij mi"	2015	6	1	POL: Platinum	Zapomnij mi
"Feel No Fear"	2016	—	—		Zapomnij mi
"Bronię się"	2017	26	3	POL: Platinum	Pióropusze
"Volta"	2017	17	2	POL: Gold	Pióropusze
"Motyle i ćmy"	2017	18	2	POL: 2× Platinum	Pióropusze
"Pióropusze"	2018	—	—		Pióropusze
"Zakryj"	2018	1	1	POL: 3× Platinum	Zakryj
"Carmen"	2019	13	1	POL: Platinum	Zakryj
"Sentymenty"	2019	—	—		Non-album single
"Tęskno mi"	2019	9	2	POL: 2× Platinum	Zakryj
"Nienaiwne"	2019	—	—		Zakryj
"—" single did not chart or was not released in this territory

== Awards and nominations ==
Year	Event	Category	Nominated work	Result
2015	Lato Zet i Dwójki 2015 (Kołobrzeg)	Hit of the Concert	"Naucz mnie"	Won
2015	Baltic Song Contest 2015	Grand Prix	—	Nominated
2015	Baltic Song Contest 2015	Audience Award	—	Won
2015	Lato Zet i Dwójki 2015 (Łodź)	Hit of the Concert	"Naucz mnie"	Won
2015	Eska Music Awards 2015	Biggest Hit	"Naucz mnie"	Won
2015	Eska Music Awards 2015	Best Artist	—	Nominated
2015	Eska Music Awards 2015	Best Radio Debut	—	Nominated
2015	2015 MTV Europe Music Awards	Best Polish Act	—	Nominated
2016	2016 Kids' Choice Awards	Favorite Polish Star	—	Nominated
2017	Barcelona Planet Film Festival	The Best Soundtrack	—	Won
2017	European Cinematography Awards	Best Singer/Voice	"PM 2.5"	Won
2017	American Tracks Music Awards	Best original song for a film	"PM 2.5"	Won
2019	2019 MTV Europe Music Awards	Best Polish Act	—	Nominated
