= USS Indiana =

Four ships of the United States Navy have been named USS Indiana in honor of the 19th state.

- USS Indiana (BB-1), was a battleship commissioned in 1895 that saw action in the Spanish–American War
- USS Indiana (BB-50), was a battleship under construction but canceled by the Washington Naval Treaty in 1924
- USS Indiana (BB-58), was a battleship commissioned in 1942 that saw action during World War II
- USS Indiana (SSN-789), is a Virginia-class submarine launched on 9 June 2017

== See also ==
- SS Indiana
