= Indiana (song) =

Single by Sarsa

from the album Zapomnij mi
- Released: 14 August 2015
- Genre: Electropop; indie pop; pop
- Length: 3:16:00
- Label: Universal Music Polska
- Songwriter: Marta Markiewicz
- Producers: Markiewicz; Tomasz Konfederak

Sarsa singles chronology
"Naucz mnie" (2015)	"Indiana" (2015)	"Zapomnij mi" (2015)

Music video
- "Indiana" on YouTube

"Indiana" is a single by Polish singer Sarsa. The song was released as the second single from her debut studio album Zapomnij mi on 14 August 2015, and was written by Sarsa with production by Sarsa along with Tomasz Konfederak.

The single reached number 1 on the Polish Airplay – New Chart and was certified gold.

== Music video ==
A music video to accompany the release of "Indiana" was released on 13 August 2015 through Sarsa's Vevo channel. It was directed by Alan Kępski.

== Track listing ==
Digital download
No.	Title	Length
1.	"Indiana"	3:16

== Charts and certifications ==
=== Weekly charts ===
Chart (2015)	Peak position
Poland (Polish Airplay Top 20)	12
Poland (Polish Airplay – New)	1

=== Certifications ===
Region	Certification	Certified units/sales
Poland (ZPAV)	Platinum	50,000^{‡}
^{‡} Sales+streaming figures based on certification alone.

== Release history ==
Region	Date	Format	Label
Poland	14 August 2015	Digital download	Universal Music Polska
