= Indiana (statue) =

Public artwork by Retta T. Matthews

- Artist: Retta T. Matthews
- Year: 1893
- Type: Sculpture
- Dimensions: 170.18 cm × 57.15 cm × 57.15 cm (67 in × 22.5 in × 22.5 in)
- Location: Indiana Statehouse; Indianapolis
- Owner: Indiana Statehouse

Indiana is a public artwork by Retta T. Matthews of Arlington, Indiana that was originally displayed in the Indiana State Building at the 1893 Chicago World's Fair. The sculpture is currently located on the fourth floor of the Indiana Statehouse in downtown Indianapolis, Indiana, USA.

== Description ==
Standing approximately five feet ten inches, Indiana stands alone in an alcove on the fourth floor of the Statehouse. The surface of the sculpture is painted in a white, most likely lead-based, paint. However, other alternatives are possible, such as a lime water and vinegar mixture. Another possibility is that, like the buildings of the Columbian Exposition, the statue is covered with a thin layer of plaster, cement, and jute fibers, which create a light but relatively durable surface.

The sculpture stands upright looking toward her right. The hair is wrapped loosely into a bun at the nape of the neck. The figure is dressed in a toga that is banded at the waist and drapes behind the back. The skirt is gathered into her left hand where the figure holds a cluster morning glory flowers. The sandal-clad feet touch at the heels with her toes pointed out. Behind her right foot lies an ear of corn.

== Historical information ==
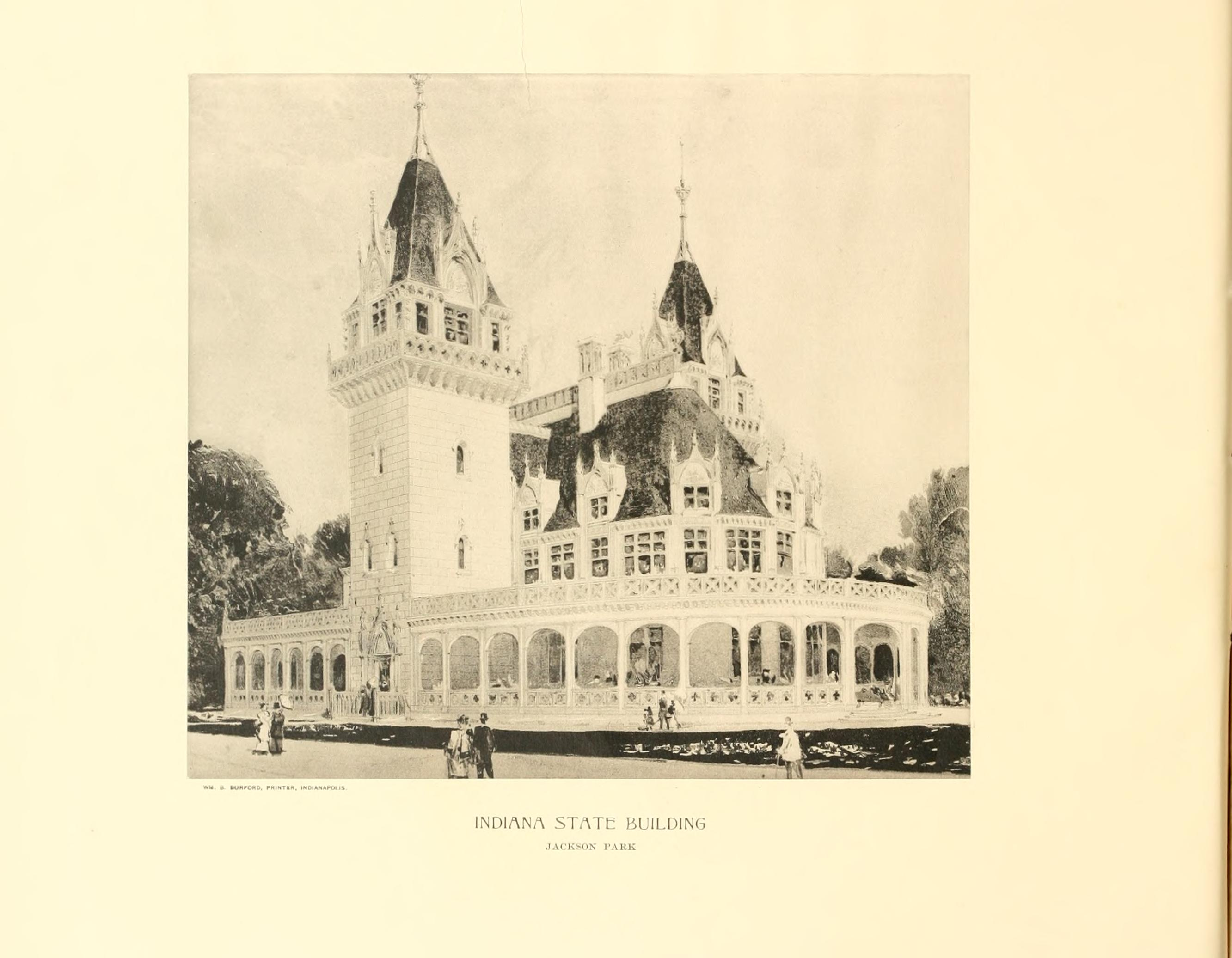
1893 Drawing of the Indiana State Building at the Chicago World's Fair by WM. B. Burford

As part of the development for the Indiana State Building at the Chicago World's Fair it was decided by the Indiana Board of Managers that a special department of Women's Work be created and managed entirely by female members of the Board. The Committee on Women's Work designated five key goals they wished to achieve. One of which was "To secure a representation of the work of Indiana women in the lines of artistic embroideries, wood-carving, china decorating, drawing, painting, etc."

This interest in Women's Work in the arts and literature led the committee to hold public meetings asking the women of Indiana for their support. The committee raised $2,651.41 to put towards their pursuits. Upon the discovery of three women, Retta Matthews, Frances M. Goodwin and Janet Scudder, natives of Indiana who wished to become professional sculptors, the Women's committee chose a piece of work from each of the women to be exhibited in the Indiana State Building. The three statues chosen were Nymph by Janet Scudder, Education by Frances M. Goodwin, and Indiana by Retta Matthews. Matthews received $800 for her sculpture of Indiana from the Women's Committee. The three statues were featured prominently in the assembly, or main reception room, of the Indiana State Building. Indiana was considered an "ideal figure of Indiana".

=== Location history ===
After their use in the Indiana State Building, the Board of Managers directed that the statues be given back to the people of Indiana. Janet Scudder was from Terre Haute, Indiana; because of this connection Nymph was placed in the Emeline Fairbanks Memorial Library, where it has since gone missing. Education was given to the Propylaeum in Indianapolis. It, too, is missing. Indiana was placed in the Indiana Statehouse. In 1926 it was located on the third floor of the Statehouse and has since been moved to the fourth floor where it is now situated in a south-facing alcove.

=== Title ===
The statue was originally titled Indiana when it was purchased for the Indiana State Building at the World's Columbian Exposition. However, at some point in time the significance and notoriety of the statue diminished, leaving the information desk at the Indiana Statehouse with only a photocopy of two pages from an unknown book published in July 1926 by the Historical Bureau of the Indiana Library and Historical Department, referring to the statue as "Indiana as an agricultural state". This lack of knowledge about the statue has led people to refer to her as Ceres, the Roman goddess of agriculture, because of her Roman-style garb and the symbolism of agriculture and bounty, as projected by the presence of the ear of corn at the statue's feet and the flowers in her hand.
