= Weronika Rosati =

Polish actress

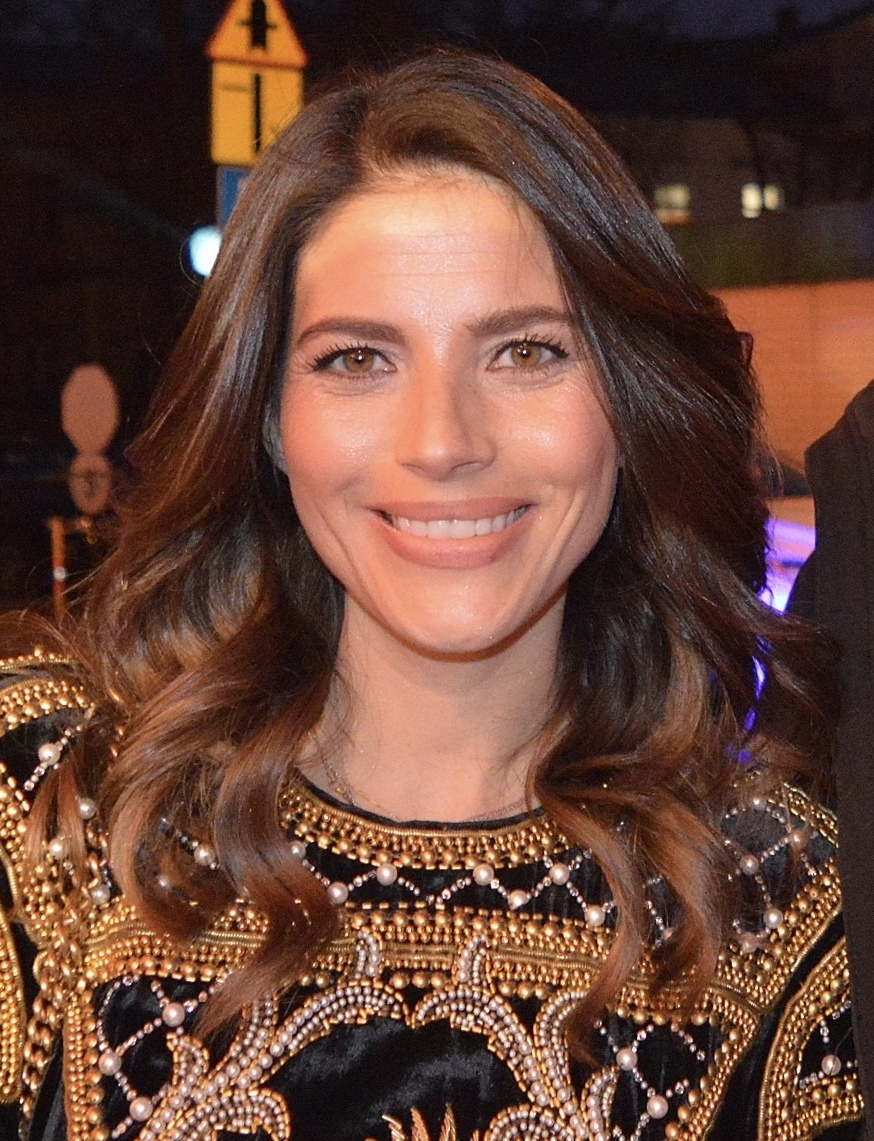
- Rosati in 2018
- Born: Weronika Anna Rosati; 9 January 1984 (age 42); Warsaw, Poland
- Education: Lee Strasberg Theatre and Film Institute
- Occupation: Actress
- Years active: 2000–present
- Children: 1
- Parent(s): Dariusz Rosati; Teresa Rosati

Weronika Anna Rosati (Polish pronunciation: [vɛrɔˈɲika rɔˈsati]; born 9 January 1984) is a Polish actress. She made her acting debut in 2000, and first gained recognition playing Ania in the Polish soap opera L for Love (2002–2005, 2018–2020). She appeared in several other Polish television series, before acquiring her first feature film role in Patryk Vega's 2005 action drama Pitbull, which went on to become a cult film in Poland. Her most critically acclaimed films include Manhunt (2012), which earned her a Polish Film Award nomination for Best Actress, and Never Gonna Snow Again (2020).

Rosati launched her international career with an uncredited cameo in David Lynch's 2006 film Inland Empire. She has since played numerous minor roles in English-language films including The Iceman (2012), Bullet to the Head (2012), USS Indianapolis: Men of Courage (2016), and I'll Find You (2019), and made guest appearances on television. She had a recurring role on the HBO original television series Luck in 2012. In her native country, she has starred in the films Obce ciało (2014) and Porady na zdrady (2017), and in television in Majka (2009–2010), Days of Honor (2010), Hotel 52 (2013), Strażacy (2015–2016) and Zawsze warto (2019–2020). Aside from acting, Rosati has been an advocate for domestic abuse victims.

== Life and career ==
=== Early life and education ===
Weronika Anna Rosati was born on 9 January 1984 in Warsaw, to Polish-Italian father Dariusz Rosati, a professor of economics and former member of the European Parliament, and his wife Teresa, a Polish fashion designer. She has an older brother named Marcin, who is 12 years her senior. When she was two, she moved with her family to Princeton, New Jersey, where her father worked as a lecturer, and when she was six, they relocated to Switzerland for five years, before returning to Poland. Having spent much of her childhood abroad, she is fluent in English and French. Upon being confirmed, she took Dolores as her confirmation name.

As a teenager, Rosati attended a theatre club at the Warsaw Ochota Theatre and trained in dancing and acrobatics at the Warsaw Studio Buffo Theatre. She also studied at the Halina and Jan Machulski Private Acting School in Warsaw. In 2003, she started an acting degree at the National Film School in Łódź, but after one and a half years, she suspended her studies due to L for Love filming commitments, and never returned. At 21, she moved to New York City, where she studied at various acting schools, including the Stella Adler Academy of Acting and Theatre, the Larry Moss Studio, and the Ivana Chubbuck Studio, and graduated from the Lee Strasberg Theatre and Film Institute.

=== Acting career ===
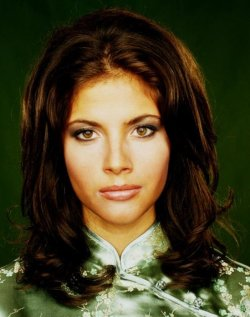
Rosati in 2008

Rosati made her acting debut in 2000 as "Niki" in the Polish television series Klasa na obcasach, which she followed with numerous guest appearances in other Polish television productions. She first gained recognition in 2002, playing Ania in the Polish soap opera L for Love. She left the series in 2005, before returning in 2018 and leaving again in 2020. Her cinematic debut came in Patryk Vega's 2005 Polish action drama Pitbull, which was a critical success and has become a cult film. For her portrayal of Gemma, the main character's (Marcin Dorociński) love interest, Rosati received two Golden Duck award nominations. She reprised the role in the film's television adaptation between 2005 and 2008.

Rosati launched her international career with an uncredited cameo in David Lynch's 2006 film Inland Empire, followed by an appearance as Mrs. Lawdale in the 2008 horror film House, which was panned by critics, receiving an approval rating of 0% on the review aggregator Rotten Tomatoes. In 2009, she joined the main cast of the Polish adaptation of the Venezuelan soap opera Jane the Virgin titled Majka, in which she played Dagmara between 2009 and 2010. In 2010, she portrayed Rojza, a girl working at a fur workshop in Warsaw Ghetto, in season three of the Polish World War II television drama series Days of Honor. She starred as a serial-killer Magdalena in the 2011 French television thriller film Dame de pique (Dame of Spades), an adaptation of Alexis Lecaye's novel of the same name, which was reviewed well by the French newspaper Le Monde. She also played a journalist named Anna in the 2011 action thriller Largo Winch II, and made a cameo appearance in Agnieszka Holland's Academy Award-nominated 2011 period drama In Darkness. In 2012, Rosati was cast in the recurring role of a poker dealer Naomi in the HBO original television series Luck, and starred as "Pestka", a girl trying to save her younger sister from death, in Manhunt, a Polish war thriller directed by Marcin Krzyształowicz. The latter earned Rosati critical praise, and a nomination for the Polish Academy Award for Best Actress. Rosati also began making more appearances in Hollywood productions that year. She played Livi in the biographical film The Iceman, Irena in the crime comedy Stand Up Guys, and Lola in the action film Bullet to the Head.

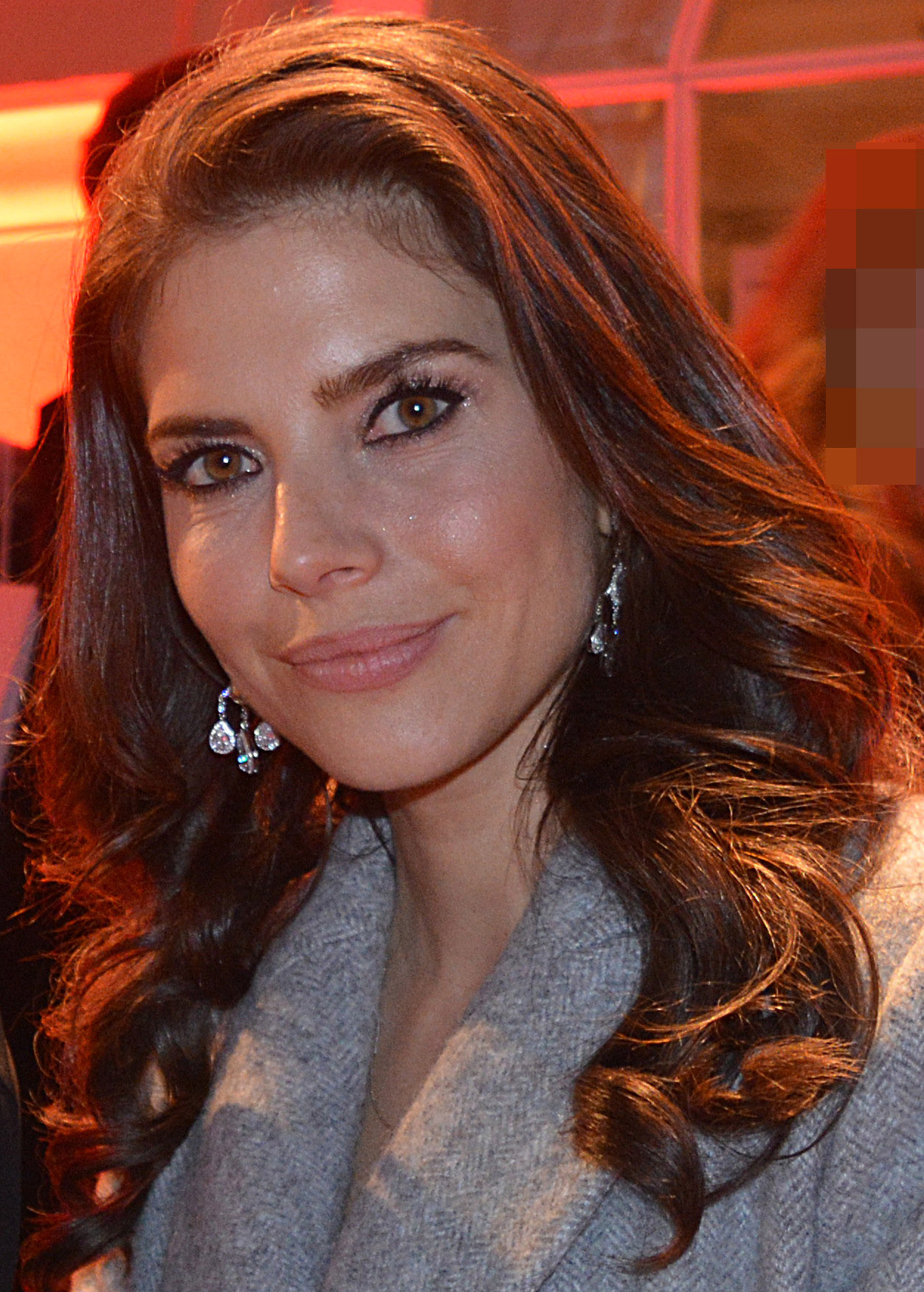
Rosati at the 2017 Polish Film Awards

In 2013, she appeared as Jolene in the dance film Battle of the Year, and as a waitress at a nightclub named Veronica in the blockbuster Last Vegas. She also made a guest appearance as Rivka David, Ziva David's (Cote de Pablo) mother, in the episode of the American action police procedural television series NCIS titled "Berlin". In her native country, she voiced Dottie in the Polish-language version of the animated film Planes, a role she reprised in its 2014 sequel, and joined the main cast of season seven of the television series Hotel 52 portraying Maria Jordan. That May, she was honoured with the Pola Negri award "Politka", which recognises Polish actors who achieved international success. In 2014, she made a cameo appearance as a girl at a nightclub named Ginger in the HBO miniseries Rosemary's Baby, and took on another voice role as Ilona in the Polish-language version of the animated film The Nut Job. She also starred as Mira, Kris' (Agnieszka Grochowska) assistant, in Krzysztof Zanussi's psychological drama Obce ciało (Foreign Body). The film premiered at the 2014 Toronto International Film Festival to mixed reviews. Rosati and Grochowska were nominated for the Polish Snake Award for Worst On-Screen Duet.

In 2015, Rosati was cast in the role of Kamila in the TVP1 original television series Strażacy (Firefighters), and made an appearance as prostitute Agnes in season two of the HBO anthology crime drama television series True Detective. The following year, she guest-starred as French agent Delphine Seydoux in an episode of season 11 of the American dark fantasy television series Supernatural, and played Russian man-eater Oksana in a "two-show arc" of season one of the TBS comedy series The Detour. Collider described her performance in the former as "positively dazzling". She also appeared opposite Nicolas Cage as his character's wife Louise McVay in Mario Van Peebles' 2016 war disaster film USS Indianapolis: Men of Courage, and voiced Princess Shallia in the Polish-language version of the comedy film The New Adventures of Aladdin. In 2017, Rosati starred in the Polish romantic comedy film Porady na zdrady for which she received a Snake Award nomination for Worst Actress. She then joined the cast of the Polish television medical drama Diagnosis in the recurring role of Beata. In the period drama I'll Find You, set in the 1930s and 1940s Poland, directed by Martha Coolidge, she played Ms. Huber, the wife of General Huber (Stephen Dorff). The film premiered at the 2019 Taormina Film Fest. In 2019, Rosati began portraying Marta, one of three lead roles, in the Polish television series Zawsze warto, which spanned two seasons between 2019 and 2020.

Rosati starred in the 2020 drama Never Gonna Snow Again directed by Małgorzata Szumowska and Michał Englert, which premiered in the Main competition of the 77th Venice International Film Festival to critical acclaim. She lent her likeness to Marianne in the 2021 psychological horror video game The Medium, for which she was fully motion-captured, and appeared as Vanya in season 12 of NCIS: Los Angeles that year. Rosati will executive produce the upcoming film adaptation of William Shakespeare's play King Lear titled Lear Rex.

=== Personal life and non-acting work ===
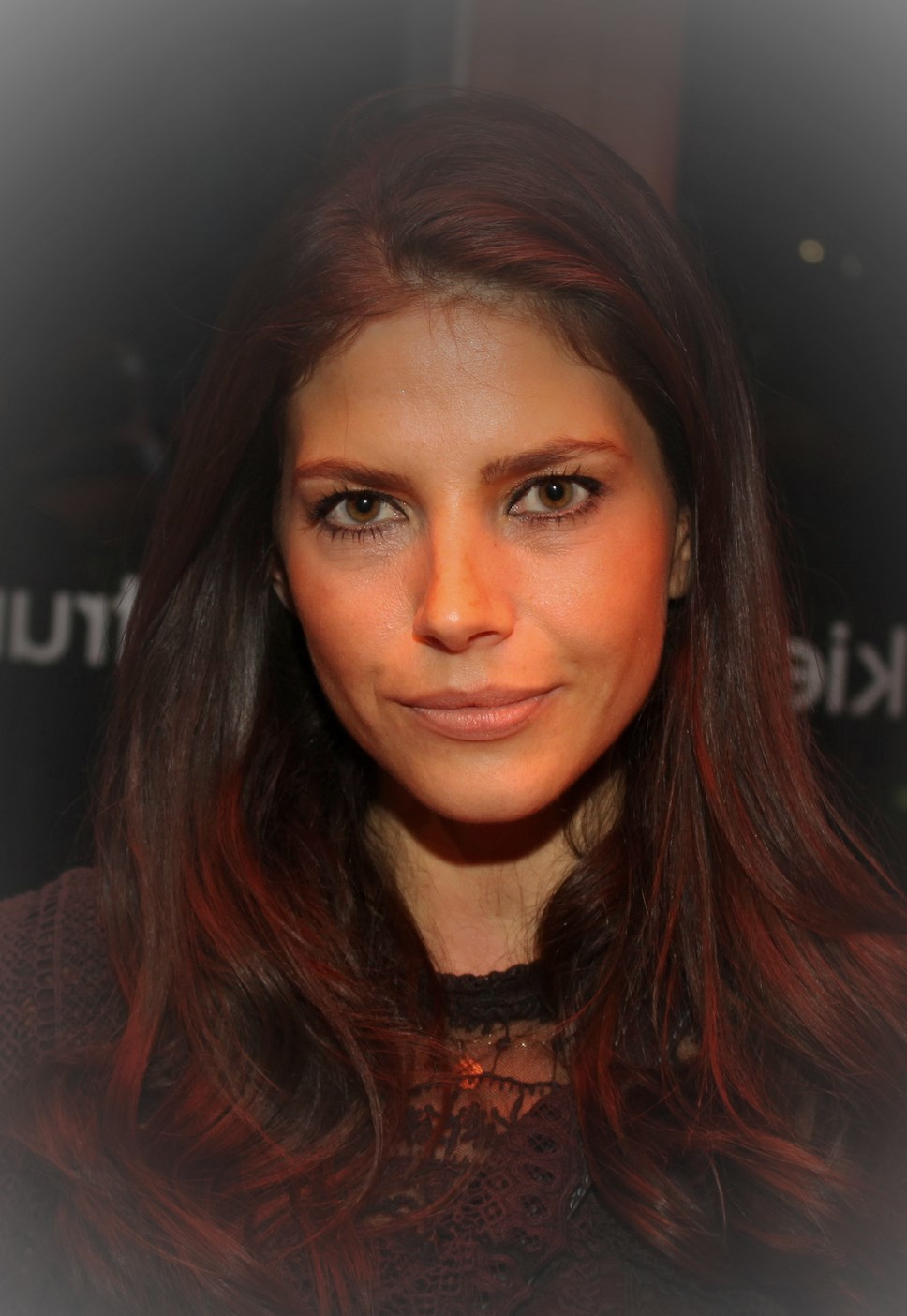
Rosati in 2016

In 2005, Rosati was in a relationship with Polish-American journalist Max Kolonko. In 2010, Polish director Andrzej Żuławski, whom she dated between 2007 and 2008, released a book titled Nocnik, which included a character allegedly based on Rosati named Esther. She sued Żuławski and the book's publisher for violation of her right to privacy and dignity as a woman as the book included intimate details about her. They were ordered to issue an apology and pay her 100,000 zł damages in 2015. In September 2013, Rosati was a passenger in a car driven by her then-partner, Polish actor Piotr Adamczyk, which was involved in a road accident. Due to a leg injury sustained in the accident, she was unable to walk and required several surgeries and continual long-term physiotherapy, which prevented her from working for several months. Rosati and Adamczyk broke up in 2015. She was engaged to Polish orthopedic surgeon Robert Śmigielski with whom she was in a relationship between 2016 and 2018. She gave birth to their daughter, Elizabeth Valentina, on 11 December 2017. As of 2020, Rosati splits her time between homes in Warsaw and Los Angeles.

While in a relationship with Śmigielski, Rosati experienced domestic abuse. She later became an advocate for domestic abuse victims. In 2019, she founded the Siła Kobiety Foundation (Woman's Strength Foundation), which offers help and support to women affected by domestic abuse. She has been credited with influencing the Me Too movement in Poland, and was honoured with the Polish Glamour Woman of the Year award for Activism.

Rosati was included on the annual list of the 100 most valuable stars of the Polish show business compiled by the Polish edition of Forbes magazine between 2012 and 2014. She ranked 84th, 85th, and 83rd, respectively. She was the Polish ambassador of Procter and Gamble hair products Pantene (2004), Dr Irena Eris skin care line and fragrance Sin Skin (2007–2008), and Avon Products fragrance Femme (2014). She participated in season 10 of Taniec z gwiazdami (Polish version of Dancing with the Stars) in 2009, was a guest judge alongside her mother on the second season of Project Runway Poland in 2015, and hosted an episode of SNL Poland in 2018. Rosati has also written articles about Hollywood stars and cinema for the website Stopklatka.pl and the magazine Film, among others. In 2021, she launched a vegan skin care brand Lajuu.

== Filmography ==
†	Denotes films that have not yet been released

=== Film ===
Year	Title	Role(s)	Director(s)	Notes
2005	Pitbull	Gemma	Patryk Vega	Nominated—2011 Golden Duck for Best On-Screen Lover; Nominated—2012 Golden Duck for Best Actress in Polish Action Films
2006	Inland Empire	Courtesan	David Lynch	Uncredited cameo
2006	Bezmiar sprawiedliwości (Immensity of Justice)	Protocole girl	Wiesław Saniewski	
2007	Lynch	Woman in factory	—N/a	Documentary
2008	Senność (Drowsiness)	Practicant	Magdalena Piekorz	
2008	House	Mrs. Lawdale	Robby Henson	
2009	Smutna (The Sad One)	Anna	Piotr Matwiejczyk	
2010	Piotrek the 13th	Angelina	Piotr Matwiejczyk	Also producer
2011	Largo Winch II	Anna	Jérôme Salle	
2011	Wojna żeńsko-męska (Battle of the Sexes)	"Suka"	Łukasz Palkowski	Voice role
2011	In Darkness	Young woman with a child	Agnieszka Holland	
2012	Manhunt	"Pestka"	Marcin Krzyształowicz	Nominated—Polish Academy Award for Best Actress
2012	The Iceman	Livi	Ariel Vromen	
2012	Stand Up Guys	Irena	Fisher Stevens	
2012	Bullet to the Head	Lola	Walter Hill	
2013	Salomé	—N/a	Al Pacino	Associate producer
2013	Planes	Dottie	Wojciech Paszkowski	Voice role; Polish-language version
2013	Battle of the Year	Jolene	Benson Lee	
2013	Last Vegas	Veronica	Jon Turteltaub	
2014	The Nut Job	Ilona (Note: In the original version of the film the character's name is Lana.)	Dariusz Dunowski	Voice role; Polish-language version
2014	Planes: Fire & Rescue	Dottie	Wojciech Paszkowski	Voice role; Polish-language version
2014	Obce ciało (Foreign Body)	Mira Tkacz	Krzysztof Zanussi	Nominated—2015 Snake Award for Worst On-Screen Duet (with Agnieszka Grochowska)
2016	The New Adventures of Aladdin	Shallia	Agnieszka Matysiak	Voice role; Polish-language version
2016	USS Indianapolis: Men of Courage	Louise McVay	Mario Van Peebles	
2017	Porady na zdrady (Tips for Cheating)	Beata Woltyńska	Ryszard Zatorski	Nominated—2018 Snake Award for Worst Actress
2017	Frost		Šarūnas Bartas	Uncredited
2018	Podatek od miłości (Taxing Love)	Ryszard's wife	Bartłomiej Ignaciuk	
2019	I'll Find You	Mrs. Huber	Martha Coolidge	
2020	Never Gonna Snow Again	Wika / Zhenia's mother	Małgorzata Szumowska; Michał Englert	Nominated–2022 Chlotrudis Award for Best Performance by an Ensemble Cast
2021	Send It	Eve	Andrew Stevens	Direct-to-digital
2021	Brigitte Bardot cudowna (Brigitte Bardot Forever)	Liz Taylor	Lech Majewski	
2022	It's Not Over	Sarah	Alessandro Riccardi	
2023	Max & Me	Mrs. Karpinski	Donovan Cook	Voice role
2026	Black Box	Isabelle	Steven Quale	
TBA	Lear Rex †	—N/a	Bernard Rose	Executive producer
TBA	Object Permanence †	TBA	Filip Jan Rymsza	

=== Television ===
Year	Title	Role	Notes
2000	Klasa na obcasach	"Niki"	
2001	Marzenia do spełnienia	Weronika	Recurring role
2002–2005, 2018–2020	L for Love	Anna "Ania" Waszkiewicz	Series regular
2002–2003	Samo Życie	Beata "Ujma"	10 episodes
2002	As	Matylda Roszak	Episode: "Piotr i Ania" ("Peter and Anne")
2003	Czego się boją faceci, czyli seks w mniejszym mieście	Dominika	4 episodes
2003–2004	Tak czy nie? (Yes or No?)	Basia Barniłowska	
2005–2008	Pitbull	Gemma	Series regular
2007	Crime Detectives	Ania Lis	Episode: "Dziewczyna z okładki" ("Covergirl")
2008	Ranking gwiazd (Ranking the Stars)	Herself	Panellist
2008	Off the Stretcher	Genowefa Basen after plastic surgery	Episode: "Niespodzianka na urodziny" ("Birthday Surprise")
2008	The Londoners	Weronika Fox	3 episodes
2009	39 and a Half	Ola	2 episodes
2009	Taniec z gwiazdami (Dancing with the Stars)	Herself	Season 10 contestant
2009–2010	Majka	Dagmara Godzwon	Series regular
2010	Days of Honor	Rojza	Season 3, 7 episodes
2011	Dame de pique (Dame of Spades)	Magdalena	Television film
2011	Bezmiar sprawiedliwości (Immensity of Justice)	Protocole girl	
2012	Luck	Naomi	Recurring role; 4 episodes
2012–2014	Piąty Stadion (The Fifth Stadium)	Julie / Gabriela Kądzik	Series regular; 26 episodes
2012	Father Matthew	Marzena Kryger	Episode: "Czarna wdowa" ("Black Widow")
2013	Spokojnie, to tylko ekonomia!	Herself	Contestant; 2 episodes
2013	NCIS	Rivka David	Episode: "Berlin"
2013	Hotel 52	Maria Jordan	Season 7 regular
2014	Rosemary's Baby	Ginger	Episode: "Night One"
2015–2016	Strażacy (Firefighters)	Kamila Miłek	Series regular
2015	Project Runway Poland	Herself	Guest judge; 1 episode
2015	True Law	Kamila Braun	1 episode
2015	True Detective	Agnes	Season 2, 2 episodes
2016	Supernatural	Delphine Seydoux	Episode: "The Vessel"
2016	Powiedz tak! (Say Yes!)	Sandra	3 episodes
2016	The Detour	Oksana	Season 1, 2 episodes
2017	Belle Epoque	Misia Antczak	4 episodes
2017	Komisarz Alex (Inspector Alex)	Maja von Hertzenbach-Przybysz	1 episode
2017	Ultraviolet	"Limbo"	1 episode
2017–2019	Diagnosis	Beata Leśniewska	Recurring role
2018	SNL Poland	Herself	Guest host; 1 episode
2019	Echo serca	Renata	1 episode
2019–2020	Zawsze warto	Marta Kulesza	Main role
2021	NCIS: Los Angeles	Vanya Leonova	Season 12, 2 episodes
2023	Lulu	Laura	1 episode
2024	Gąska	Herself	1 episode

=== Video games ===
Year	Title	Role	Notes
2021	The Medium	Marianne	Likeness
