= Golden Duck (award) =

Polish award presented by Film magazine

Złota Kaczka (translation: Golden Duck) is a Polish award presented by the monthly Film since 1956.

== Złota Kaczka for best movie ==
Note: this list contains only the prizes awarded in the "best movie" category.

- 1956: Sprawa pilota Maresza
- 1957: Kanał
- 1958: Popiół i diament
- 1959: Pociąg
- 1960: Krzyżacy
- 1961: Matka Joanna od Aniołów
- 1962: Nóż w wodzie
- 1963: Jak być kochaną
- 1964: Pierwszy dzień wolności
- 1965: Popioły
- 1966: Faraon
- 1967: Westerplatte
- 1968: Żywot Mateusza
- 1969: Pan Wołodyjowski
- 1970: Krajobraz po bitwie
- 1971: Życie rodzinne
- 1972: not admitted
- 1973: not admitted
- 1974: Potop
- 1975: Bilans kwartalny
- 1976: Przepraszam, czy tu biją?
- 1977: Kochaj albo rzuć
- 1978: Spirala
- 1979: Klincz
- 1980: Kung-fu
- 1981: not admitted
- 1982: not admitted
- 1983: Wielki Szu
- 1984: Seksmisja
- 1985: Yesterday
- 1986: C.K. Dezerterzy
- 1987: Matka Królów
- 1988: Krótki film o zabijaniu
- 1989: Przesłuchanie
- 1990: Ucieczka z kina "Wolność"
- 1991: Podwójne życie Weroniki
- 1992: Psy
- 1993: Kolejność uczuć
- 1994: Trzy kolory: Biały
- 1995: Tato
- 1996: Pułkownik Kwiatkowski
- 1997: Kiler
- 1998: Historia kina w Popielawach
- 1999: Ogniem i mieczem
- 2000: Life as a Fatal Sexually Transmitted Disease
- 2001: Cześć Tereska
- 2002: Edi
- 2003: Ciało
- 2004: Pręgi
- 2005: Komornik
- 2006: Plac Zbawiciela
- 2007: Ziemia obiecana (the best movie of 50th anniversary of Złote Kaczki)
- 2008: Lejdis
- 2009: 33 sceny z życia
- 2010: Dom zły
- 2011: Sala samobójców
- 2012: Jesteś Bogiem
