= List of Polish submissions for the Academy Award for Best International Feature Film =

Best International Feature Film submissions from Poland

Highlights
- Debut: 1963
- Submissions: 58
- Nominations: 13
- Oscar winners: 1

Poland has submitted films for the Academy Award for Best International Feature Film (Note: The category was previously named the Academy Award for Best Foreign Language Film, but this was changed to the Academy Award for Best International Feature Film in April 2020, after the Academy deemed the word "Foreign" to be outdated.) since 1963. The award is handed out annually by the United States Academy of Motion Picture Arts and Sciences to a feature-length motion picture produced outside the United States that contains primarily non-English dialogue. It was not created until the 1956 Academy Awards, in which a competitive Academy Award of Merit, known as the Best Foreign Language Film Award, was created for non-English speaking films, and has been given annually since.

As of 2026, Poland has been nominated thirteen times, winning once for Ida (2015).

== Submissions ==
The Academy of Motion Picture Arts and Sciences has invited the film industries of various countries to submit their best film for the Academy Award for Best International Feature Film since 1956. The International Feature Film Committee oversees the process and reviews all the submitted films. Following this, they vote via secret ballot to determine the five nominees for the award.

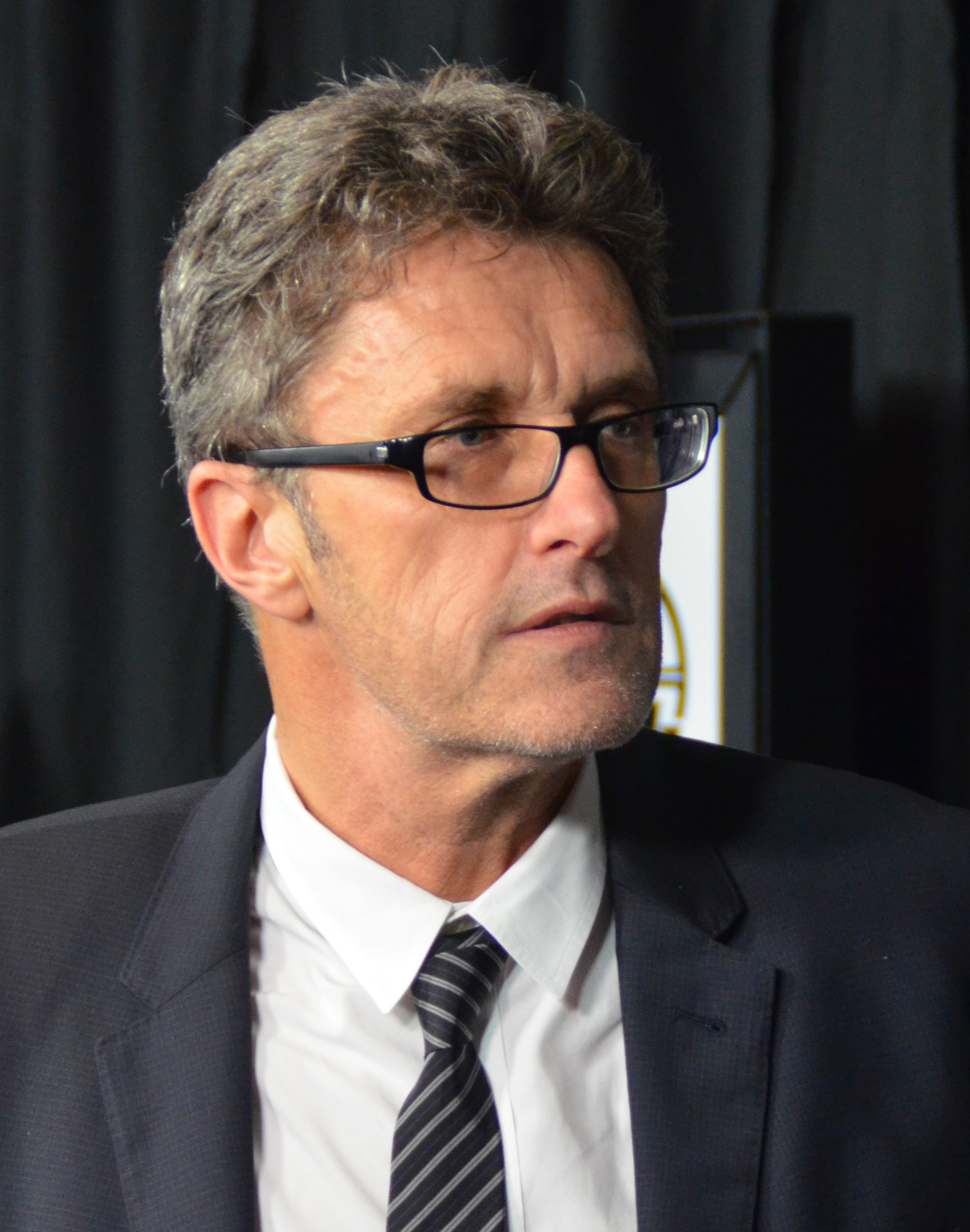
Paweł Pawlikowski directed Ida (2013), the first film to win the award for Poland.

Poland first nomination was Knife in the Water (1963), directed by Roman Polanski, which is also the director's only Polish-language film, he went to win an Academy Award for Best Director four decades later for The Pianist (2002).

Andrzej Wajda represented Poland for a record nine times, and four of his films received nominations (The Promised Land, The Maids of Wilko, Man of Iron and Katyń), also a record. While Polish filmmaker legend Jerzy Skolimowski received his first nomination in 2022, for the comedy-drama EO.

Agnieszka Holland was the first woman to be nominated representing Poland, for In Darkness (2011).

Paweł Pawlikowski was nominated twice, winning in 2013, alongside a nomination for the Academy Award for Best Director for Cold War (2019).

Below is a list of the films that have been submitted by Poland for review by the Academy for the award by year and the respective Academy Awards ceremony.

Year (Ceremony)	Film title used in nomination	Original title	Director(s)	Result
1963 (36th)	Knife in the Water	Nóż w wodzie	Roman Polanski	Nominated
1964 (37th)	Passenger	Pasażerka	Andrzej Munk and Witold Lesiewicz	Not nominated
1966 (39th)	Pharaoh	Faraon	Jerzy Kawalerowicz	Nominated
1968 (41st)	Matthew's Days	Żywot Mateusza	Witold Leszczyński	Not nominated
1969 (42nd)	Everything for Sale	Wszystko na sprzedaż	Andrzej Wajda	Not nominated
1970 (43rd)	The Taste of Black Earth	Sól ziemi czarnej	Kazimierz Kutz	Not nominated
1971 (44th)	Family Life	Życie rodzinne	Krzysztof Zanussi	Not nominated
1972 (45th)	Pearl in the Crown	Perła w koronie	Kazimierz Kutz	Not nominated
1973 (46th)	Copernicus	Kopernik	Ewa Petelska and Czesław Petelski	Not nominated
1974 (47th)	The Deluge	Potop	Jerzy Hoffman	Nominated
1975 (48th)	The Promised Land	Ziemia Obiecana	Andrzej Wajda	Nominated
1976 (49th)	Nights and Days	Noce i dnie	Jerzy Antczak	Nominated
1977 (50th)	Camouflage	Barwy ochronne	Krzysztof Zanussi	Not nominated
1978 (51st)	Death of a President	Śmierć prezydenta	Jerzy Kawalerowicz	Not nominated
1979 (52nd)	The Maids of Wilko	Panny z Wilka	Andrzej Wajda	Nominated
1980 (53rd)	Olympics 40	Olimpiada 40	Andrzej Kotkowski	Not nominated
1981 (54th)	Man of Iron	Człowiek z żelaza	Andrzej Wajda	Nominated
1985 (58th)	Yesterday		Radosław Piwowarski	Not nominated
1986 (59th)	Axiliad	Siekierezada	Witold Leszczyński	Not nominated
1987 (60th)	Hero of the Year	Bohater roku	Feliks Falk	Not nominated
1988 (61st)	A Short Film About Love	Krótki film o miłości	Krzysztof Kieślowski	Not nominated
1989 (62nd)	Kornblumenblau	Kornblumenblau	Leszek Wosiewicz	Not nominated
1990 (63rd)	Korczak	Korczak	Andrzej Wajda	Not nominated
1991 (64th)	The Double Life of Véronique	Podwójne życie Weroniki	Krzysztof Kieślowski	Not nominated
1992 (65th)	All That Really Matters	Wszystko, co najważniejsze	Robert Gliński	Not nominated
1993 (66th)	Squadron	Szwadron	Juliusz Machulski	Not nominated
1994 (67th)	Three Colours: White	Trzy kolory. Biały	Krzysztof Kieślowski	Not nominated
1995 (68th)	Crows	Wrony	Dorota Kędzierzawska	Not nominated
1996 (69th)	At Full Gallop	Cwał	Krzysztof Zanussi	Not nominated
1997 (70th)	Love Stories	Historie miłosne	Jerzy Stuhr	Not nominated
1999 (72nd)	Pan Tadeusz	Pan Tadeusz	Andrzej Wajda	Not nominated
2000 (73rd)	Life as a Fatal Sexually Transmitted Disease	Życie jako śmiertelna choroba przenoszona drogą płciową	Krzysztof Zanussi	Not nominated
2001 (74th)	Quo Vadis		Jerzy Kawalerowicz	Not nominated
2002 (75th)	Edi		Piotr Trzaskalski	Not nominated
2003 (76th)	Pornografia		Jan Jakub Kolski	Not nominated
2004 (77th)	The Welts	Pręgi	Magdalena Piekorz	Not nominated
2005 (78th)	The Collector	Komornik	Feliks Falk	Not nominated
2006 (79th)	Retrieval	Z odzysku	Sławomir Fabicki	Not nominated
2007 (80th)	Katyń		Andrzej Wajda	Nominated
2008 (81st)	Tricks	Sztuczki	Andrzej Jakimowski	Not nominated
2009 (82nd)	Reverse	Rewers	Borys Lankosz	Not nominated
2010 (83rd)	All That I Love	Wszystko, co kocham	Jacek Borcuch	Not nominated
2011 (84th)	In Darkness	W ciemności	Agnieszka Holland	Nominated
2012 (85th)	80 Million	80 milionów	Waldemar Krzystek	Not nominated
2013 (86th)	Walesa: Man of Hope	Wałęsa. Człowiek z nadziei	Andrzej Wajda	Not nominated
2014 (87th)	Ida		Paweł Pawlikowski	Won Academy Award
2015 (88th)	11 Minutes	11 minut	Jerzy Skolimowski	Not nominated
2016 (89th)	Afterimage	Powidoki	Andrzej Wajda	Not nominated
2017 (90th)	Spoor	Pokot	Agnieszka Holland	Not nominated
2018 (91st)	Cold War	Zimna wojna	Paweł Pawlikowski	Nominated
2019 (92nd)	Corpus Christi	Boże Ciało	Jan Komasa	Nominated
2020 (93rd)	Never Gonna Snow Again	Śniegu już nigdy nie będzie	Małgorzata Szumowska and Michał Englert	Not nominated
2021 (94th)	Leave No Traces	Żeby nie było śladów	Jan P. Matuszyński	Not nominated
2022 (95th)	EO	Io	Jerzy Skolimowski	Nominated
2023 (96th)	The Peasants	Chłopi	DK Welchman and Hugh Welchman	Not nominated
2024 (97th)	Under the Volcano	Pod wulkanem	Damian Kocur	Not nominated
2025 (98th)	Franz		Agnieszka Holland	Not nominated
2026 (99th)	Fatherland	Ojczyzna	Paweł Pawlikowski	Pending

== Shortlisted Films ==
Since 2020, Poland has announced a list of finalists or eligible films that varied in number over the years (from 5 to 10 films) before announcing their official Oscar nominee. The following films have been submitted to the Polish Film Institute for consideration:

Year	Films
2020	25 Years of Innocence · Clergyman ·The Hater · Kill It and Leave This Town · Supernova · Sweat
2021	The Getaway King · Operation Hyacinth · Prime Time
2022	The Balcony Movie · Broad Peak · Filip · Fucking Bornholm · Illusion · Silent Land · Woman on the Roof
2023	Green Border · In the Rearview · Pianoforte · Woman Of...
2024	Go Against the Flow · Life And Deaths Of Max Linder · Minghun · Next to Nothing · One Soul · People · Scarborn · Silent Trees · Woman Of...
2025	Child of Dust · Chopin, A Sonata in Paris · Home Sweet Home · Letters from Wolf Street · Trains · Two Sisters · Vinci 2
2026	Closure · Gorky Resort · No Ghosts on Good Street · Our Revolution · Through the Wall · Wild Wild East

== See also ==
- Cinema of Poland
- List of Polish films
- List of Academy Award winners and nominees for Best International Feature Film
- List of Academy Award-winning foreign language films
