= Andrzej Chyra =

Polish actor (born 1964)

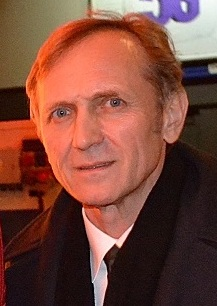
- Chyra in 2020
- Born: 27 August 1964 (age 62); Gryfów Śląski, Poland
- Education: National Academy of Dramatic Art in Warsaw
- Occupations: actor; director
- Years active: 1993–present

Andrzej Chyra (Polish: [ˈandʐɛj ˈxɨra], born 27 August 1964) is a Polish actor and theatre director. He is a member of the Polish Film Academy and the European Film Academy. In 2006, he received the Polish Academy Award for Best Actor for his performance in Feliks Falk's drama film The Collector.

== Life and career ==
He graduated from high school and in 1987 he graduated from the Acting Theater School in Warsaw. In 1994, he majored at the same university in directing.

He made his film debut in 1993, with the role of Benvollo in the film Order of Affection, directed by Radosław Piwowarski. The largest role so far that brought him recognition was as Gerard Nowak in the 1999 film The Debt (Dług) by Krzysztof Krauze, for which he was awarded the Best Actor award at the Polish Film Festival in Gdynia. The success of this was continued in 2005 when he received the Polish Academy Award for Best Actor for his role in Komornik. In 2007, he starred in Andrzej Wajda's Academy Award-nominated historical drama film Katyń.

He was also nominated for Polish Film Awards his roles in the films We're All Christs (2006), Never Gonna Snow Again (2021) and All Our Fears (2021).

In 2015, he was awarded the Konrad Swinarski Prize for directing Paweł Mykietyn's opera Czarodziejska góra based on Thomas Mann's novel The Magic Mountain. In 2019, he received the Zbigniew Cybulski Award for Lifetime Achievement.

== Filmography ==
=== Film ===
- 1988 – Decalogue IV (TV Mini-Series) - Theatre Student (uncredited)
- 1993 – Kolejność uczuć - Actor playing Benvoll
- 1994 – Zawrócony (TV Movie) - Priest
- 1999 – Dług - Gerard Nowak
- 1999 – Kallafiorr
- 2000 – Gra
- 2000 – Wyrok na Franciszka Kłosa
- 2001 – Pieniądze to nie wszystko
- 2001 – Przedwiośnie
- 2001 – Where Eskimos Live
- 2001 – Wiedźmin
- 2003 – Pogoda na jutro
- 2003 – Powiedz to, Gabi
- 2003 – Siedem przystanków na drodze do raju
- 2003 – Symmetry
- 2003 – Zmruż oczy
- 2004 – Ono
- 2004 – Tulipany
- 2005 – Komornik
- 2005 – Persona Non Grata
- 2006 – Palimpsest
- 2006 – S@motność w sieci
- 2006 – Strike
- 2006 – We're All Christs
- 2007 – Katyń
- 2008 – Magiczne drzewo
- 2008 – Nieruchomy poruszyciel
- 2009 – Wszystko co kocham
- 2009 – Zdjęcie
- 2010 – Mistyfikacja
- 2012 - Land of Oblivion
- 2013 - In the Name Of
- 2013 - Lasting
- 2016 - United States of Love
- 2017 - Frost
- 2017 - Beyond Words
- 2018 - One Nation, One King
- 2019 - Listen to the Universe
- 2020 - Doctor Lisa
- 2020 - Never Gonna Snow Again
- 2020 — Magnesium
- 2020 - Kill It and Leave This Town (voice only)
- 2021 - All Our Fears
- 2021 - The Wedding
- 2026 — Colors of Evil: Black
- 2026 — The Doll
- TBA - Santo Subito!

=== Television ===
- 1996 – Bar "Atlantic"
- 1996 – Honor dla niezaawansowanych
- 1997 – Boża podszewka
- 1997 – Zaklęta
- 1998 – Miodowe lata
- 2000–2001 – Miasteczko
- 2000 – Twarze i maski
- 2002 – Przedwiośnie
- 2002 – Wiedźmin
- 2003–2005 – Defekt
- 2003 – Zaginiona
- 2004–2005 – Oficer
- 2006 – Oficerowie
- 2006 – S@motność w sieci
- 2007 – Cztery poziomo
- 2022 – Cracow Monsters
- 2023 – A Girl and an Astronaut

== Theatre direction ==
- Z dziejów alkoholizmu w Polsce, Stara Prochownia Theatre, Warsaw (1994)
- Przegryźć dżdżownicę, Piętro Theatre, Poznań (1997)
- Kochanek, Centrum Kultury Theatre (1998)
- Gracze, Baltic State Opera, Gdańsk (2013)
- Carmen, Grand Theatre, Warsaw (2018)
