= Agnieszka Krukówna =

Polish actress (born 1971)

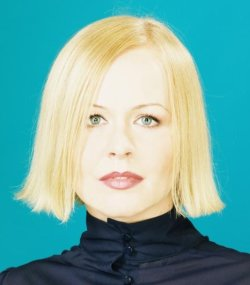
- Agnieszka Krukówna, 2008
- Born: 20 March 1971 (age 55); Chorzów, Poland
- Education: National Academy of Dramatic Art in Warsaw
- Occupation: Actress
- Years active: 1984–2021

Agnieszka Krukówna (born 20 March 1971, Chorzów) is a retired Polish film, television and theatre actress. She is a laureate of the Polish Film Award for Best Actress for her role a 1998 film Farba.

== Life and career ==
She was born on 20 March 1971 in Chorzów. In 1983, at the age of 12, she made her film debut by appearing in Wojciech Sawa's film Panny. In 1995, she graduated from the National Academy of Dramatic Art in Warsaw. During her studies she starred in such films as Steven Spielberg's 1993 historical drama Schindler's List, Jerzy Antczak's 1994 film Dama kameliowa and Radosław Piwowarski's film Kolejność uczuć. She worked at the Powszechny Theatre in Warsaw. In 1999, she was awarded the Polish Film Award for best actress for her role in Michał Rosa's film Farba. She also gained great popularity by playing the main protagonist of a teen drama TV series Janka.

== Filmography ==
- 1984: Panny as Iwonka
- 1985: Urwisy z Doliny Młynów as jako Asia
- 1986: Klementynka i Klemens as jako Asia
- 1987: Ucieczka z miejsc ukochanych as Hela (episodes 2 and 3)
- 1989: Janka as Janka Nowak
- 1990: Kramarz as daughter
- 1990: Korczak as Ewa
- 1990: W piątą stronę świata as Dorota
- 1990: Life for Life: Maximilian Kolbe as Konior's daughter
- 1990: Janka as Janka Nowak
- 1992: Szwadron as Weronka
- 1993: Schindler's List as Czurda's girlfriend
- 1993: Kolejność uczuć as the director's wife
- 1994: Dama kameliowa as Nanine
- 1995: Pestka as Sabina
- 1997: Farba as Farba
- 1997: Łóżko Wierszynina as Irina
- 1997: Boża podszewka as Maryśka Jurewicz
- 1997: Czas zdrady as Rosana
- 1999: With Fire and Sword as a young Ukrainian girl
- 1999: Fuks as Sonia
- 2003: Na dobre i na złe as Grażyna Małecka (episodes 132-134)
- 2003: Męskie-żeńskie as Hania (episode 2)
- 2003-2004: Na Wspólnej as Iwona Gładczyńska
- 2003: Defekt as Ewa Bauman
- 2004: Kosmici as Lucy Majewska
- 2005: Rozdroże Cafe as Katarzyna
- 2005: Klinika samotnych serc as Joanna Kawecka (episodes 1, 2 and 9)
- 2006: Niania as Aśka Nowaczyńska (episode 45)
- 2011: Rezydencja as Oracja Modzelewska
- 2013: Psubrat as mother
- 2014: Na dobre i na złe as Marzena Konopka (episode 559)
- 2015 Letnie przesilenie as Romek's Mother
- 2020: 25 Years of Innocence as Supreme Court Judge

== See also ==
- Polish cinema
- Polish Film Awards
