= Never Gonna Snow Again =

2020 film

- Film poster
- Polish: Śniegu już nigdy nie będzie
- Directed by: Małgorzata Szumowska; Michał Englert
- Screenplay by: Michał Englert; Małgorzata Szumowska
- Produced by: Agnieszka Wasiak; Mariusz Włodarski; Viola Fügen; Michael Weber; Małgorzata Szumowska; Michał Englert
- Starring: Alec Utgoff; Maja Ostaszewska; Agata Kulesza; Weronika Rosati; Katarzyna Figura; Łukasz Simlat; Andrzej Chyra; Krzysztof Czeczot
- Cinematography: Michał Englert
- Edited by: Jarosław Kamiński
- Production companies: Lava Films; Match Factory Productions; Mazovia Film Fund; Kino Świat; DI-Factory; Bayerischer Rundfunk
- Distributed by: Kino Świat (Poland); Real Fiction (Germany)
- Release dates: 7 September 2020 (Venice); 4 June 2021 (Poland)
- Running time: 113 minutes
- Countries: Poland; Germany
- Languages: Polish; Russian
- Box office: $96,423

Never Gonna Snow Again (Polish: Śniegu już nigdy nie będzie) is a 2020 Polish-German comedy-drama film directed by Małgorzata Szumowska and Michał Englert. It stars Alec Utgoff, Maja Ostaszewska, Agata Kulesza, Weronika Rosati, Katarzyna Figura, Andrzej Chyra, Łukasz Simlat, and Krzysztof Czeczot.

The film premiered at the 77th Venice International Film Festival, where it competed in the main competition. It was selected as the Polish entry for the Best International Feature Film at the 93rd Academy Awards, but failed to receive a nomination. It garnered seven Polish Film Award nominations, winning Best Cinematography.

== Plot ==
A young man named Zhenia crosses the border from Ukraine to Poland with a collapsible massage table under his arm and heads to the immigration office in Warsaw. There, he tells the officer he wants to live in Poland, takes the officer's head in his hands, and puts him in a trance, allowing him to stamp and sign his own residence permit.

Zhenia moves into a Warsaw housing estate. He begins regularly visiting his upper-class clients in a gated community on the outskirts of the city, including the housewife Maria and the widow Ewa. A father with cancer, Marek Roznowski, also clings to Zhenia's healing hands in a last hope. Right after the father's death, Zhenia has sex with his widow. During a public magic show with her, he disappears without a trace.

Despite their wealth, the residents of this gated community radiate an inner sadness. Zhenia often uses hypnosis and appears to have telekinetic abilities. In a flashback, the viewer learns that his mother, from Prypiat, died from the Chernobyl nuclear disaster, and he couldn't help her. It also becomes clear that the original film title refers to this disaster. At the end of the film, it snows.

== Cast ==
- Alec Utgoff as Zhenia
  - Konstantin Solowiow as Young Zenia
- Maja Ostaszewska as Maria
- Agata Kulesza as Ewa
- Weronika Rosati as Wika / Zhenia's mother
- Katarzyna Figura as Gucci, owner of Bulldogs
- Andrzej Chyra as Captain
- Łukasz Simlat as Wika's husband, Marek Roznowski
- Krzysztof Czeczot as Maria's husband
- Maciej Drosio as Jan
- Astrid Nanowska as Blonde
- Wojciech Starostecki as Blonde's Husband
- Blanka Burzynska as Maria's daughter
- Adrian Podlaski as Maria's son
- Lena Wochal as Maria's daughter
- Maria Seweryn as Director
- Ewa Dałkowska as Zenia's Mother
- Agata Trzebuchowska as Woman at a Concert

== Production ==
In December 2019, it was reported that Małgorzata Szumowska had started shooting a film under the working title Wonder Zenia on location in and around Warsaw. Ukrainian-born actor Alec Utgoff was cast in the title role, while Polish actresses Agata Kulesza, Maja Ostaszewska, Weronika Rosati and Katarzyna Figura were also cast.

== Critical reception ==
On review aggregator Rotten Tomatoes, Never Gonna Snow Again holds an approval rating of 94% based on 53 reviews, with an average rating of 7.6/10. The website's critical consensus reads, "Led by Alec Utgoff's impressive starring performance, Never Gonna Snow Again blends elements of sci-fi, satire, and surreal drama with an assured hand." On Metacritic, the film has a weighted average score of 73 out of 100, based on 7 critics, indicating "generally favourable reviews".

Regarding the character of Zhenia, Giuseppe Sedia wrote on Kino Mania: "Ukrainians are the biggest foreign community in Poland and are looked at by many as a mere workforce. Zhenia instead is welcomed as a wonderful alien, almost a messiah figure capable of manipulating and healing the bodies and maybe unintentionally, the souls of his clients".

The Guardian placed the film at number 35 on its list of the 50 best films of 2021 in the UK.

== Accolades ==
At the 77th Venice International Film Festival, Never Gonna Snow Again competed for the Golden Lion and received a special mention for its treatment of issues related to environment by the Premio Fondazione Fai Persona Lavoro Ambiente committee. At the 2021 Polish Film Awards, the film received seven nominations: Best Actress (Kulesza and Ostaszewska), Best Supporting Actor (Chyra and Simlat), Best Costume Design (Katarzyna Lewińska), Best Makeup and Hairstyling (Waldemar Pokromski), and Best Cinematography (Michał Englert), winning the latter. At the 2022 Chlotrudis Awards, it received five nominations: Best Performance by an Ensemble Cast, Best Actor (Utgoff), Best Original Screenplay, Best Sound Design and Best Cinematography.

== See also ==
- List of submissions to the 93rd Academy Awards for Best International Feature Film
- List of Polish submissions for the Academy Award for Best International Feature Film
