= List of 2013 box office number-one films in Poland =

This is a list of films which placed number one at the weekend box office for the year 2012 in Poland.

== Number-one films ==
†	This implies the highest-grossing movie of the year.

Date	Film	Gross
January 6, 2013	The Hobbit: An Unexpected Journey	$3,500,915
January 13, 2013	The Hobbit: An Unexpected Journey	$3,183,807
January 20, 2013	Sep	$2,988,287
January 27, 2013	The Impossible	$2,959,500
February 3, 2013	Drogówka	$3,634,625
February 10, 2013	Drogówka	$3,119,353
February 17, 2013	Drogówka	$3,281,888
February 24, 2013	Drogówka	$2,191,724
March 3, 2013	Syberiada Polska	$1,767,182
March 10, 2013	Oz the Great and Powerful	$1,987,195
March 17, 2013	Oz the Great and Powerful	$1,201,190
March 24, 2013	Oz the Great and Powerful	$941,753
March 31, 2013	Oz the Great and Powerful	$257,653
April 7, 2013	The Croods	$2,424,782
April 14, 2013	Uklad Zamkniety	$1,854,966
April 21, 2013	Uklad Zamkniety	$1,621,093
April 28, 2013	Uklad Zamkniety	$1,288,500
May 5, 2013	The Croods	$1,229,828
May 12, 2013	Iron Man 3	$2,873,170
May 19, 2013	Iron Man 3	$1,283,675
May 26, 2013	Fast & Furious 6	$2,303,894
June 9, 2013	The Hangover Part III	$1,895,460
June 16, 2013	The Hangover Part III	$1,337,679
June 23, 2013	Man of Steel	$1,185,329
June 30, 2013	Now You See Me	$1,603,095
July 7, 2013	Monsters University	$613,322
July 14, 2013	Despicable Me 2	$671,415
July 21, 2013	Despicable Me 2	$326,869
July 28, 2013	The Wolverine	$223,256
August 4, 2013	The Smurfs 2	$771,168
August 11, 2013	The Smurfs 2	$779,991
August 18, 2013	Planes	$522,419
August 25, 2013	Blue Jasmine	$484,760
September 1, 2013	Planes	$429,679
September 8, 2013	Riddick	$303,636
September 15, 2013	Riddick	$216,457
September 22, 2013	In the Name Of	$275,645
September 29, 2013	Turbo	$563,583
October 6, 2013	Walesa: Man of Hope †	$893,383
October 13, 2013	Gravity	$730,971
October 20, 2013	Gravity	$543,576
October 27, 2013	Gravity	$382,613
November 3, 2013	Gravity	$292,723
November 10, 2013	Thor: The Dark World	$1,043,909
November 17, 2013	Thor: The Dark World	$519,113
November 24, 2013	The Hunger Games: Catching Fire	$1,237,405
December 1, 2013	Frozen	$993,164
December 8, 2013	Frozen	$1,374,306
December 15, 2013	Frozen	$934,931
December 22, 2013	Frozen	TBD
December 29, 2013	The Hobbit: The Desolation of Smaug	$4,399,736
