= Alec Utgoff =

English actor

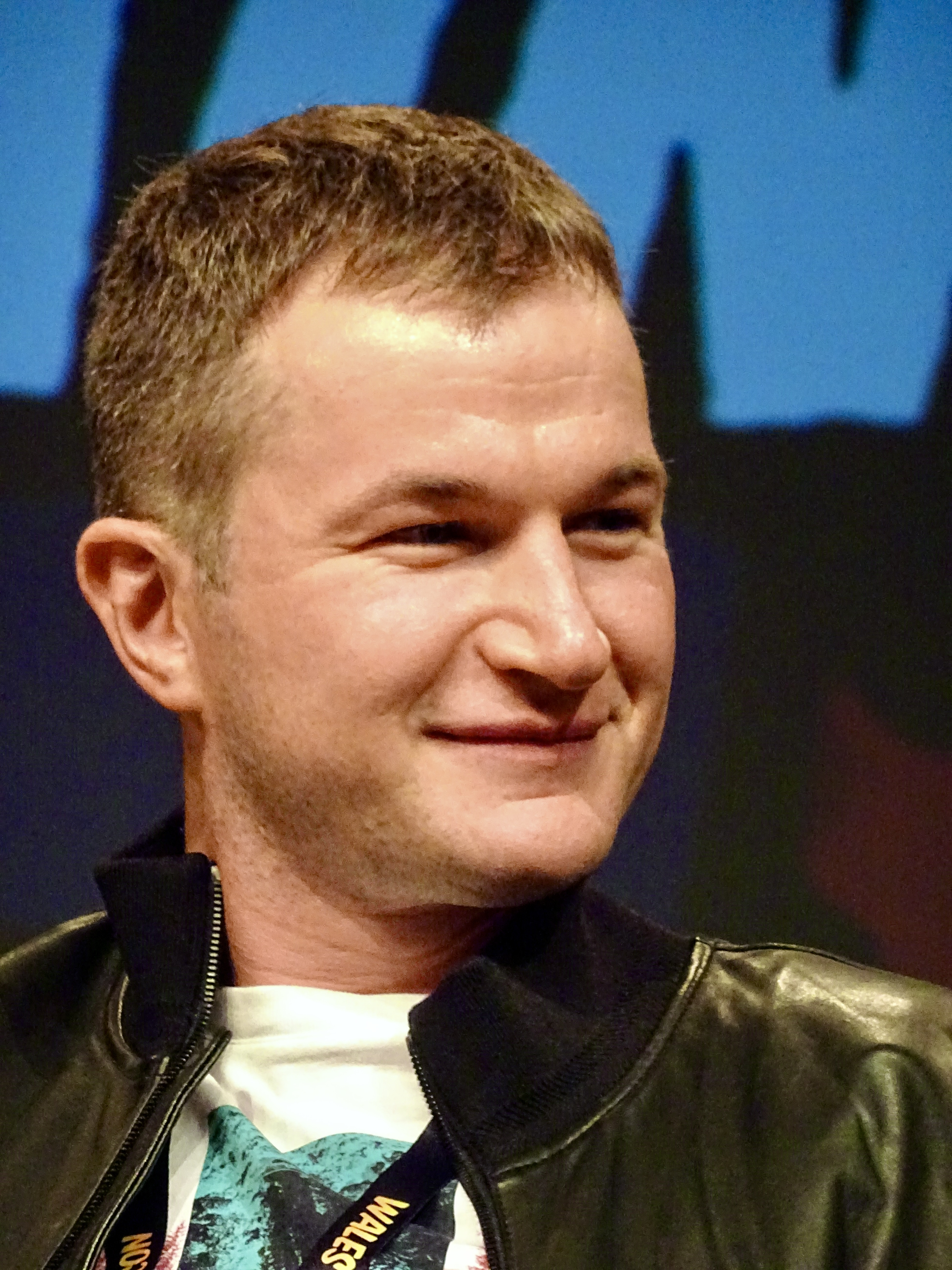
- Alec Utgoff At Wales Comic-Con Homecoming Wrexham 2022
- Born: Oleg Vladimirovich Utgoff; 1 March 1986 (age 40); Kyiv, Ukrainian SSR, Soviet Union
- Education: Drama Centre London
- Occupation: Actor
- Years active: 2010–present

Alec Utgoff (Ukrainian: Олег Володимирович Утгоф; born 1 March 1986) is a British actor known for his roles in various films and television series. Born in Kyiv, Ukrainian SSR, he moved to the UK at a young age.

Utgoff's acting career began with a role in the film The Tourist, which he secured while still completing his final year of studies. He initially focused on theater, performing a wide range of roles, and is considered a classically trained actor. Utgoff is best known for his portrayal of Aleksandr Borovsky in Jack Ryan: Shadow Recruit and Dr. Alexei in the third season of Stranger Things.

His other notable roles include Alexi in San Andreas (2015) and Darius in the Ridley Scott epic Gladiator 2.

One of Utgoff's most significant achievements is his lead role in the film Never Gonna Snow Again, which premiered at the 77th Venice International Film Festival as part of the main competition. The film earned critical acclaim and was selected as the Polish entry for the Academy Award for Best International Feature Film at the 93rd Academy Awards.

== Early life ==
Utgoff was born in Kyiv, Ukrainian SSR, Soviet Union (now Kyiv, Ukraine)

His father, Volodymyr Utgoff, is a cardiac surgeon of Russian-German descent, originally from Crimea. His mother, Roza Utgoff, is a musical conductor and is Ossetian by nationality.

== Filmography ==
=== Films ===
| Year | Title | Role | Notes | Ref. |
|---|---|---|---|---|
| 2010 | The Tourist | Fedka | | |
| 2010 | Over the Hills | Aaron | Short film | |
| 2011 | The Why Men | Torpedo | Short film | |
| 2012 | The Seasoning House | Josif | | |
| 2013 | Common People | Veiko | | |
| 2013 | Outpost: Rise of the Spetsnaz | Kostya | | |
| 2014 | Jack Ryan: Shadow Recruit | Aleksandr Borovsky | | |
| 2015 | Mortdecai | Dmitri | | |
| 2015 | San Andreas | Alexi | | |
| 2015 | Mission: Impossible – Rogue Nation | A400 Crewman | | |
| 2016 | Our Kind of Traitor | Niki | | |
| 2020 | Never Gonna Snow Again | Zhenia | | |
| 2024 | Gladiator II | Darius | | |

=== TV series ===
| Year | Title | Role | Notes | Ref. |
|---|---|---|---|---|
| 2010 | Spooks | Chief Hacker | 1 episode | |
| 2013–2014 | The Wrong Mans | Yuri & Dimitri | 6 episodes | |
| 2013 | Legacy | Rhykov | Television film | |
| 2015 | River | Sasha Mischenko | 1 episode | |
| 2016 | Power Monkeys | Alexi | Main role | |
| 2019 | Stranger Things | Alexei | Recurring role (season 3) | |
| 2020 | Dracula | Abramoff | 1 episode | |
| 2022 | The Lazarus Project | Rudy | 3 episodes | |
| 2022 | Slow Horses | Arkady Pashkin | 4 episodes | |
