= Chasing Ghosts =

Chasing Ghosts may refer to:

== Music ==
- Chasing Ghosts (album), a 2012 album by Australian post-hardcore band The Amity Affliction
- Chasing Ghosts, a 2022 album by American industrial rock band Stabbing Westward
- "Chasing Ghosts" (Alesha Dixon song), 2008
- "Chasing Ghosts" (song), a 2014 song by Kylie and Garibay

== Film and television ==
- Chasing Ghosts: Beyond the Arcade, a 2007 documentary film directed by Lincoln Ruchti about the golden age of video arcade games
- Chasing Ghosts (2005 film), a mystery film starring Michael Madsen
- "Chasing Ghosts" (The Shield), a 2007 television episode
- "Chasing Ghosts" (NCIS), a 2013 television episode
- "Chasing Ghosts" (NCIS: New Orleans), a 2014 television episode
- "Chasing Ghosts" (Powers), a 2016 television episode

== Other uses ==
- Chasing Ghosts, a book about the Iraq War by Lieutenant Paul Rieckhoff
