= In the Name Of (film) =

2013 Polish film

- Film poster
- Directed by: Małgorzata Szumowska
- Written by: Michal Englert; Małgorzata Szumowska
- Produced by: Agnieszka Kurzydło
- Starring: Andrzej Chyra; Mateusz Kosciukiewicz; Maja Ostaszewska; Łukasz Simlat; Tomasz Schuchardt; Maria Maj; Olgierd Łukaszewicz
- Cinematography: Michal Englert
- Edited by: Jacek Drosio
- Music by: Ben Bridwell
- Production company: Mental Disorder 4
- Release dates: 8 February 2013 (Berlin); 12 September 2013 (Poland)
- Running time: 96 minutes
- Country: Poland
- Language: Polish
- Box office: $ 1 127 938

In the Name Of (Polish: W imię...) is a 2013 Polish drama film directed by Małgorzata Szumowska. The film won the Teddy Award for Best Feature Film on LGBT topics at the 63rd Berlin International Film Festival and was screened at the Frameline Film Festival at the Castro Theater in San Francisco on 25 June 2013. The film focuses on a closeted gay Catholic priest living in rural Poland.

== Plot ==
Father Adam (Andrzej Chyra) takes over a new parish and organizes a center for socially maladjusted youth. He quickly convinces people with energy, charisma and openness. Friendship with a local outsider (played by Mateusz Kościukiewicz) will force the priest to face his own problems, from which he once escaped into the clergy.

== Cast ==
- Andrzej Chyra as Priest Adam
- Mateusz Kosciukiewicz as "Dynia" Lukasz
- Maria Maj as Dynia's mother
- Maja Ostaszewska as Ewa
- Tomasz Schuchardt as "Blondi"
- Łukasz Simlat as Ewa's husband
