= Berlin (NCIS) =

- NCIS episode
- Episode no.: Season 10; Episode 21
- Directed by: Terrence O'Hara
- Written by: Scott Williams and Gina Lucita Monreal
- Original air date: April 23, 2013

Guest appearances
- Oded Fehr as Ilan Bodnar; Alan Dale as Homeland Senior Division Chief Tom Morrow; Marina Sirtis as Orli Elbaz; Iddo Goldberg as Yaniv Bodnar; Damon Dayoub as Adam Eshel; Weronika Rosati as Rivka David; Dove Meir as Amir Mantel; Ben Morrison as Young Eli David; Gabi Coccio as Young Ziva David; Willem Van Der Vegt as Edward Kraus

Episode chronology
← Previous "Chasing Ghosts"	Next → "Revenge"
- NCIS season 10

"Berlin" is the 21st episode of the tenth season of the American police procedural drama NCIS, and the 231st episode overall. It originally aired on CBS in the United States on April 23, 2013. The episode is written by Scott Williams and Gina Lucita Monreal and directed by Terrence O'Hara, and was seen live by 17.33 million viewers.

The episode advances a storyline focusing on the murder of significant secondary characters in the series and the romance between main characters Tony and Ziva. It carries the storyline surrounding the deaths of Ziva's father, Mossad Director Eli David, and Vance's wife, Jackie, who were both killed off in the January episode "Shabbat Shalom". Ziva continues to pursue revenge against Eli's killer, Ilan Bodnar, and Vance continues to endorse her actions despite orders from Homeland Security to rein them in.

"Berlin" introduced the new Mossad director, Orli Elbaz, portrayed by Marina Sirtis. Several actors reprised their roles from previous episodes, including Gabi Coccio as young Ziva, Ben Morrison as young Eli, and Oded Fehr as Ilan Bodnar.

The installment was generally well-received, with the ratings being up from the previous week and critics giving it favorable reviews. The network and producers advertised the reported development of Ziva's relationship with Tony within the episode. Particularly, a scene in which the characters dance together while in Berlin was heavily promoted and received favorable commentary from reviewers.

== Background ==
NCIS follows a team of government agents who work for the Naval Criminal Investigative Service. The main cast includes Mark Harmon as team leader Leroy Jethro Gibbs, Michael Weatherly as Senior Agent Anthony "Tony" DiNozzo, Cote de Pablo as Mossad Liaison Officer turned NCIS Agent Ziva David, Pauley Perrette as Forensic Specialist Abby Sciuto, Sean Murray as Special Agent Timothy McGee, David McCallum as Autopsy Technician Donald "Ducky" Mallard, Rocky Carroll as NCIS Director Leon Vance, and Brian Dietzen as Medical Assistant Jimmy Palmer.

Executive producer Gary Glasberg began discussing the possibility of killing off Ziva's father and Vance's wife in the spring of 2012. He approached Rocky Carroll and Cote de Pablo about the potential storyline, as well as Paula Newsome and Michael Nouri, who portray Jackie Vance and Eli David respectively. De Pablo was interested in the idea, seeing the ramifications of it as something that had not been explored with her character before, and Carroll agreed that the death of Vance's wife would dynamically change his role in the series. Glasberg reported that Newsome and Nouri were understandably unhappy about their characters' deaths, but agreed to "give it everything they could". The plot twist, initially advertised as a "huge Ziva story" that would "rock Vance's world", culminated in Eli and Jackie being shot to death in a house attack in the 11th episode of the season, "Shabbat Shalom".

The killings set the course for the rest of the season, and, in the following episode, "Shiva", it is revealed that Eli's protégé, Ilan Bodnar, had orchestrated the attack. Ziva begins to seek revenge with Vance's support, covertly attempting to track Bodnar's location after he escapes arrest and goes into hiding. In the episode directly prior to "Berlin", Tony confronts her about her behavior, prompting her to approach Gibbs about going to Rome to apprehend Bodnar, where he is believed to be located. Gibbs agrees and instructs her to take Tony with her.

== Plot ==
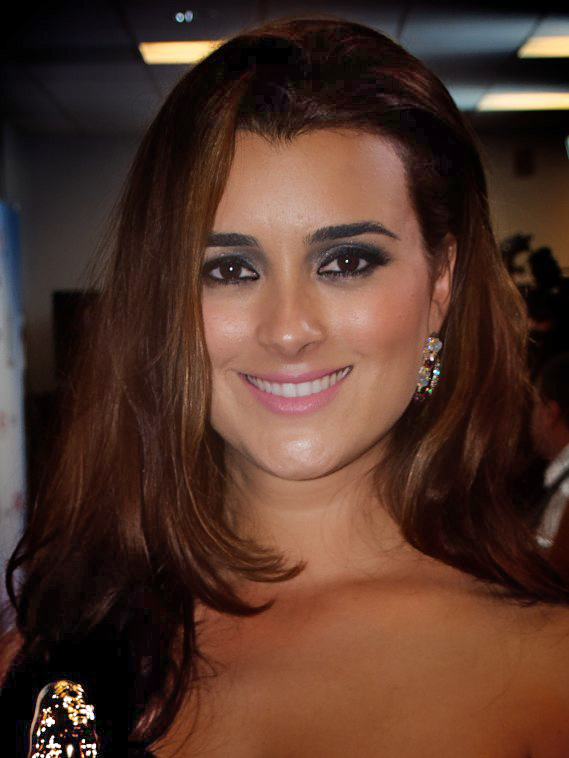
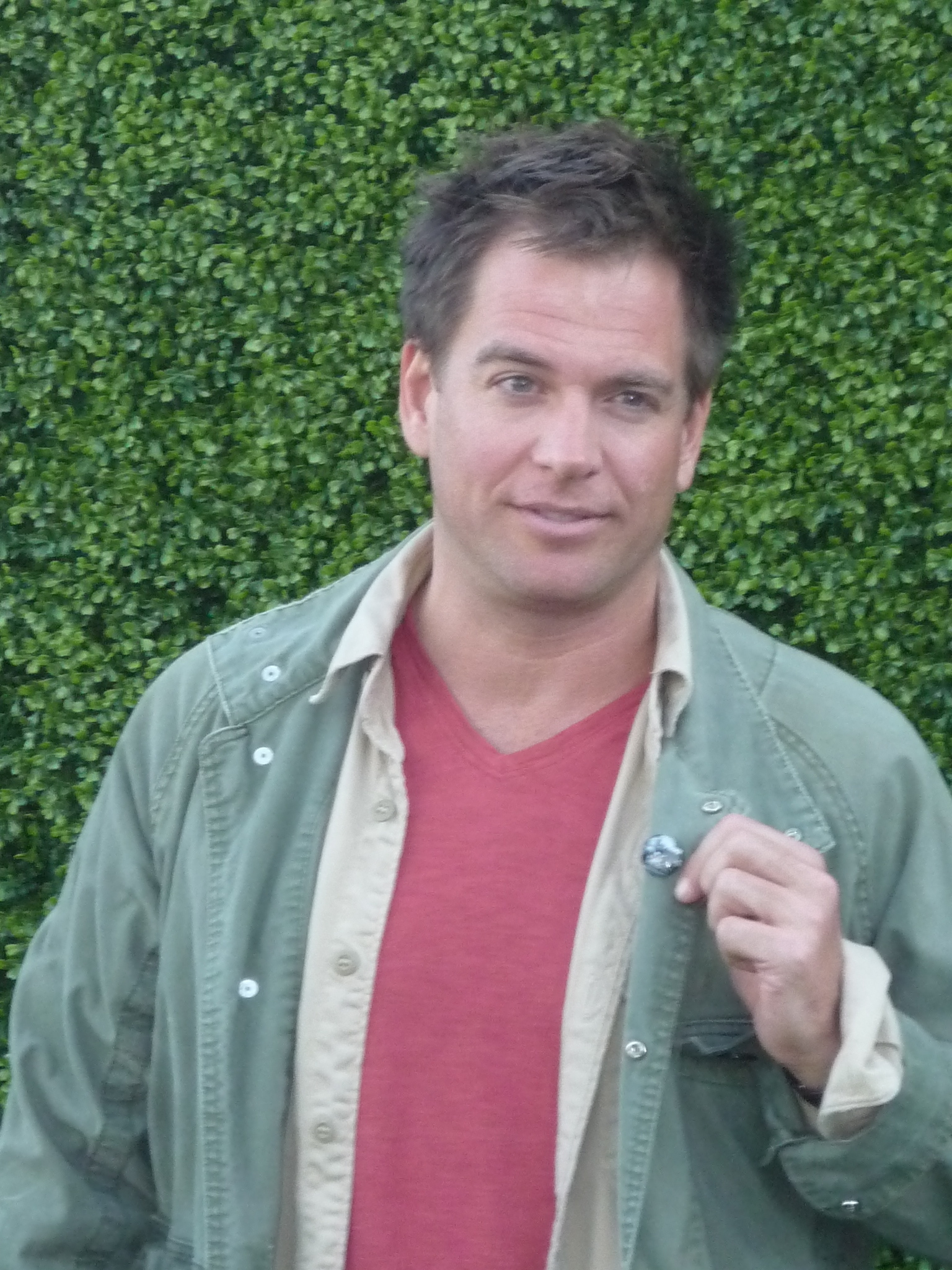
Cote de Pablo (left) and Michael Weatherly (right) portray main characters Ziva and Tony, whose relationship is a prominent subject in the episode.

As the episode opens, Mossad Officer Amir Mantel (Dove Meir) is shot dead at point blank range in an American parking garage. At NCIS headquarters, Ziva cancels plans to pursue Eli David's killer, Ilan Bodnar (Oded Fehr), in Rome, having come to the conclusion that he will relocate to Berlin shortly. Before she and Tony depart, the new Mossad director, Orli Elbaz (Marina Sirtis), arrives in hopes of collaborating with the agency in the search for Bodnar. Ziva frostily congratulates her for her promotion and declines an offer to put her in contact with Mossad operatives in Rome.

Elbaz informs Gibbs and Director Vance that five Mossad officers went rogue following Eli's assassination in support of Bodnar's attempted coup d'état. She explains that Mantel had been investigating the situation when he was killed, and Vance hesitantly grants her request for cooperation among the agencies.

Beginning on the airplane to Berlin, flashbacks are interlaced throughout the episode, illustrating the tensions caused by Eli's frequent absence during Ziva's adolescence and the disintegration of Rivka (Weronika Rosati) and Eli David's marriage. Also while on the plane, Ziva explains her rationale for changing their destination: her father had told her to convert all funds to diamonds with a dealer in Berlin should she ever need to go into hiding. She assumes that he would have given Bodnar, who he viewed as a son, the same advice.

She and Tony meet up with her Israeli friend, Adam Eshel (Damon Dayoub), who gives them information on Bodnar's whereabouts and intentions. Bodnar contacts Ziva on the computer, urging her to walk away. They are able to track his location but are unable to apprehend him as he disappears into a crowd. Later, they learn that he is planning to pick up the diamonds from an ally (Willem Van Der Vegt) at a night club. While waiting to intercept him, Tony dances with Ziva both to help her get a better view of the area and to calm her agitated state of mind. Bodnar seems to appear, but when Ziva approaches him, she is stunned to see that it is Ilan's brother, Yaniv (Iddo Goldberg).

Meanwhile, Gibbs and Vance order McGee to hack into the Mossad database, discovering that all five operatives Elbaz had claimed were rogue are still listed as active members and that Mantel was the only traitor. When confronted, Elbaz at first deflects, but when informed that "Bodnar" has been arrested in Berlin, admits that she had believed that he never left the United States. Realizing shortly after that it is Yaniv who is in custody, she explains that she had hoped that the other agencies' search in Rome would cause Ilan to let his guard down. Vance and Homeland Senior Division Chief Tom Morrow (Alan Dale), while angry about her deception, decide to look the other way.

As Ziva and Tony drive home from the airport, she divulges the reason for her resentment of the new director: Orli Elbaz was the reason for her parents' divorce. She discloses that she had always believed that it was a political strategy on Elbaz's part in attempt to advance her rank in Mossad, though she now thinks that it is possible that Elbaz had loved Eli. When she adds that she believes that she would be a different person were it not for Elbaz, Tony expresses thankfulness that things occurred the way they did.

The episode ends with a cliffhanger when an unknown vehicle crashes into their car, leaving their fates unclear.

== Production ==
=== Writing ===
"Berlin" was written by Scott Williams and Gina Lucita Monreal. The episode marked the return of Ilan Bodnar, the "disgraced Mossad Deputy Director" last seen when he fled from both NCIS and Mossad after the deaths of Eli David and Jackie Vance. Following the two-part episode arc in January surrounding the killings and the immediate aftermath, show runner Gary Glasberg decided to pull away from the storyline for a few months to focus on the typical police procedural work that the NCIS team is normally shown doing. The writers returned to the plot in "Chasing Ghosts", the episode before "Berlin" by revealing that Ziva had been searching for Bodnar on her despite being told not to, intending to kill him as revenge.

Glasberg previewed Ziva's state of mind and divulged, "People are going to see a Ziva David that they haven't seen in a long time. There is a strength and a resolute determination." A few days after the episode aired, Williams and Monreal stated:

Since we last saw Ilan Bodnar..., we've striven to whet your appetite with a few choice ingredients. 1. Ziva's determination for revenge. 2. Tony's watchful eye over his favorite Israeli, and... 3. The sparks that fly when 1 and 2 combine. Yep, the path of vengeance brings Tony and Ziva together in ways we can only hint at in other episodes. So when our fearless leader, Gary Glasberg, teamed us up with orders to add another chapter to this Tiva [Tony and Ziva] saga, we jumped at the challenge. And that was BEFORE we realized we'd get to write flashbacks, and a dance, and a hotel room, and diamonds, and the new Mossad director, and Berlin, and a car crash. Truth is, start to finish, this episode was a blast. And it all started with Tiva…

=== Casting ===
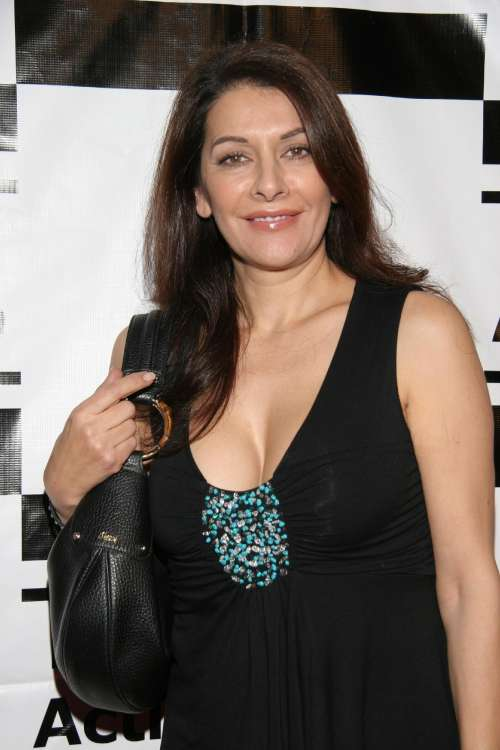
Marina Sirtis guest starred as Orli Elbaz, the new director of Mossad, first shown in this episode.

"Berlin" marked the first appearance of Eli David's killer, Ilan Bodnar, played by Oded Fehr, since the January episode "Shiva". Gabi Coccio reprised her role as young Ziva for flashbacks threaded throughout the episode, and Ben Morrison acted alongside her as young Eli.

"The search to replace Eli David as Mossad Director was tricky for us, but we ended up with a true find in Marina Sirtis. I've always been a Star Trek fan, but Marina really owns this part. And the cast loves her. She's everything I wanted for the role and then some. We are lucky to have her."

— Executive producer Gary Glasberg on the casting of Marina Sirtis as Orli Elbaz.

On March 25, 2013, the casting of Marina Sirtis as Orli Elbaz, the new director of Mossad, was announced. Sirtis, who formerly portrayed the main character Deanna Troi in the Star Trek enterprise, indicated that she enjoyed working with Mark Harmon and said that he welcomed her to the set by bringing her breakfast on the first day of filming.

"There is a lot of history between Ziva and Orli," Glasberg hinted before the episode aired. He added that the characters' relationship would be tense and complex; their background and the reasoning behind Ziva's animosity towards the new Mossad director would be explained in the final scenes. Sirtis described her character's relationship with Ziva as electric, explaining that she saw Orli as a counterfoil to Ziva's intensity and drive for vengeance. Their history, she believed, is "kind of mind-blowing"; it provides an explanation for subplots introduced earlier in the episode. She clarified that Director Elbaz would not be a "shrinking flower": "She's kickass. She's strong. She's manipulative. She uses every weapon in her female arsenal. These parts for middle-aged women in Hollywood do not come along very often. I'm thrilled that the producers of the show were brave enough to cast a woman in this role. They're prepared to take risks. It's a big gamble."

=== Filming ===
Before the episode aired, a photograph depicting Tony and Ziva dancing while in Germany was released and promoted, and Glasberg commented, "This is a very personal moment of vulnerability where her guard goes down and she lets herself melt into his arms. I think it's a moment that our Tiva fans will truly enjoy."

Cote de Pablo relayed that there had been a dispute between the director, Terrence O'Hara, and the actors during filming about how the scene should be choreographed. Both sides thought that it needed to be very intimate, but the director thought that the moment should be drawn out more while de Pablo and Michael Weatherly wanted to keep it brief. Furthermore, the latter two believed that simply looking at each other would be sufficient to convey the message to the audience. Eventually, de Pablo approached O'Hara and said, "Listen, if there was any more time of staring into each other's eyes, it would be like, cut to a hotel room." In an interview, she explained that she and Weatherly played the characters as being at a more vulnerable level than is typical for the show. She likened Tony to a "man Teddy Bear" in the episode; in the Tony-Ziva dynamic, he is normally portrayed as being the more juvenile of the two while Ziva is more mature and worldly. In "Berlin", their roles are largely reversed as more of "the little girl in Ziva" is shown and as Tony takes charge of the situation while they are dancing. De Pablo said that she found this reversal in their interactions to be an interesting change.

Producers Avery Drewe and Richie Owens coordinated the visual effects during the final scene of the episode and were only able to do one take during filming. Stunt driver Steve Kelso drove the SUV when it crashed into Tony's car, reportedly driving at 50 miles per hour, though bloggers indicated that they thought that the car looked more like it was going 80 miles per hour.

== Reception ==
=== Ratings ===
"Berlin" was seen by 17.33 million live viewers at its April 23, 2013 broadcast, with a 2.8/8 share among adults aged 18 to 49. A rating point represents one percent of the total number of television sets in American households, and a share means the percentage of television sets in use tuned to the program. In total viewers, "Berlin" was the highest rated show on the night it aired. The spin-off NCIS: Los Angeles drew second and was seen by 14.22 million viewers. Berlin had higher ratings and attracted more adults aged 18–49 than the previous episode, "Chasing Ghosts".

=== Critical reviews ===
BuddyTV marked "Berlin" as number 9 on its list of "The 10 Best 'Tiva' Episodes", and Entertainment Weekly contributor Sandra Gonzalez remarked that the episode had "some of the best 'Tiva' moments of all time". TVLine reviewers Matt Webb Mitovich and Michael Ausiello commented that the episode gave Tiva fans "the best of times...[and] the worst of times", and that there were both light and dark moments for the couple, "including 'diamond shopping,' dancing (punctuated by a meaningful Eli flashback) and, yes, hand-holding."

Douglas Wolfe from TV Fanatic gave the episode 4.8/5 and said that he did not think the episode could have been executed better. Wolfe emphasized Ziva's back story with her father and speculated that many of her choices were based upon events that her family experienced, including her father's repeated absences and the breakup of her parents' marriage due to Eli's indiscretions with a young Orli Elbaz, which also explained Ziva's resentment of Elbaz. Wolfe was touched by Ziva's dance with Tony, and her flashback to dancing with her father as a child while he tells her, "My Ziva. One day you will dance with a man who deserves your love". In a TV Fanatic round table, Steve Marsi added, "What an emotionally loaded quote from the Eli flashback, followed by the much-anticipated present-day dance." He went on to say that Sirtis did well as the new Mossad director and that "Counselor Deanna Troi was nothing but a faint memory". Michelle Calbert from TV Equals praised the storyline and agreed that Marina Sirtis performed well in the role, saying that she found Orli to be a more likeable character than Eli David.

"Berlin" ended with Tony and Ziva being in what appeared to be a severe car crash, so viewers speculated about the extent of the damage done and focused on the fact that Ziva's portrayer had not yet renewed her contract for the show at the time. TV Guide called the car crash in the closing moments of the episode as its "best cliffhanger" of the week.
