= Jerzy Block =

Polish actor and director

Jerzy Block (March 20, 1904 in Grabica, Poland – June 29, 1996 in Konstancin-Jeziorna, Poland) was a Polish actor and director. He is best known for his role of Józef in the film Konopielka.
