= The Maids of Wilko =

- Directed by: Andrzej Wajda
- Written by: Jarosław Iwaszkiewicz; Zbigniew Kamiński
- Starring: Daniel Olbrychski
- Cinematography: Edward Kłosiński
- Edited by: Halina Prugar-Ketling
- Release date: 4 September 1979
- Running time: 118 minutes
- Country: Poland
- Language: Polish

The Maids of Wilko (Polish: Panny z Wilka) is a 1979 Polish drama film directed by Andrzej Wajda. It was nominated for the Academy Award for Best Foreign Language Film at the 52nd Academy Awards. "Maids" is used in the sense of "maidens", hence another translation could be The Maidens of Wilko.

== Plot ==
At the age of 40, Wiktor Ruben (Daniel Olbrychski) returns to the family property (Wilko) where he'd spent his late teens/early twenties as a tutor of young sisters. Now they are all adult women - mostly wives and mothers. Wiktor discovers that Fela, once the closest to him, has been dead for some time; the other sisters aren't keen to talk about her, and her grave is mostly forgotten. He is also disappointed by how all the women have changed. Julia (Anna Seniuk), now a mother of two, doesn't resemble his first object of desire and doesn't show him the affection he might have expected. Jola (Maja Komorowska), seemingly unhappy in her marriage, chases him and makes fun of him until he doesn't bring the painful memories of the past. Kazia (Krystyna Zachwatowicz), a divorcee - and thus treated as less worthy than the others - is the most demanding partner of his intellectual reflections, while Zosia (Stanisława Celińska) is - as always - distant and outspoken. That leaves him with Tunia (Christine Pascal), who was only a child when he previously knew her, and who now resembles Fela. Wiktor spends time in Wilko, but isn't able to see that his return restored once forgotten dreams and hopes to the sisters.

== Cast ==
- Daniel Olbrychski as Wiktor Ruben
- Anna Seniuk as Julcia
- Maja Komorowska as Jola
- Stanisława Celińska as Zosia
- Krystyna Zachwatowicz as Kazia
- Christine Pascal as Tunia
- Zbigniew Zapasiewicz as Julcia's Husband
- Zofia Jaroszewska as Wiktor's Aunt
- Tadeusz Białoszczyński as Wiktor's Uncle
- Paul Guers as Jola's Husband (as Paul Dutron)

== See also ==
- List of submissions to the 52nd Academy Awards for Best Foreign Language Film
- List of Polish submissions for the Academy Award for Best Foreign Language Film
