= Mug (film) =

2018 Polish film

- Film poster
- Directed by: Małgorzata Szumowska
- Written by: Małgorzata Szumowska
- Starring: Mateusz Kościukiewicz
- Release dates: 23 February 2018 (Berlin); 6 April 2018 (Poland)
- Running time: 91 minutes
- Country: Poland
- Language: Polish
- Box office: $1 million

Mug (Polish: Twarz, lit. 'Face') is a 2018 Polish drama film directed by Małgorzata Szumowska. It was selected to compete for the Golden Bear in the main competition section at the 68th Berlin International Film Festival. The film was awarded Jury Grand Prix at the festival.

== Synopsis ==
Since 6 November 2010 in Świebodzin, western Poland, stands the tallest statue of Christ in the world, 36 meters excluding the base. In 2013, a 33-year-old man, victim of a workplace accident, underwent the first face transplant ever performed in Poland. The film merges these two national records of the director's compatriots.

== Cast ==
- Mateusz Kościukiewicz
- Agnieszka Podsiadlik
- Malgorzata Gorol
- Roman Gancarczyk

== Reception ==
=== Box office ===
Mug grossed $0 in the United States and Canada and $1 million in other countries.

=== Critical response ===
On review aggregator website Rotten Tomatoes, the film has an approval rating of 75%, based on 16 reviews, with an average rating of 6.7/10. Metacritic reports a score of 70 out of 100, based on 4 critics, indicating "generally favorable reviews".
