= Axiliad =

1986 Polish film

- Directed by: Witold Leszczyński
- Written by: Witold Leszczyński
- Starring: Edward Zentara
- Release date: 13 October 1986
- Running time: 82 minutes
- Country: Poland
- Language: Polish

Axiliad (Polish: Siekierezada) is a 1986 Polish drama film directed by Witold Leszczyński. The film was selected as the Polish entry for the Best Foreign Language Film at the 59th Academy Awards, but was not accepted as a nominee.

== Cast ==
- Edward Zentara as Janek Pradera
- Ludwik Pak as Peresada
- Daniel Olbrychski as Michal Katny
- Ludwik Benoit as Wasyluk
- Wiktor Zborowski as Young Batiuk
- Krzysztof Majchrzak as Kaziuk
- Franciszek Pieczka as Forester

== See also ==
- List of submissions to the 59th Academy Awards for Best Foreign Language Film
- List of Polish submissions for the Academy Award for Best Foreign Language Film
