= Anna Seniuk =

Polish actress (born 1942)

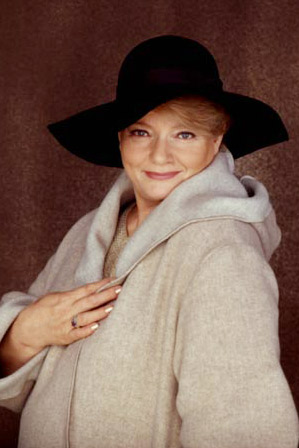
- Anna Seniuk
- Born: Anna Seniuk; 17 November 1942 (age 83); Stanislawow, Poland, now Ivano-Frankivsk, Ukraine
- Years active: 1964–present

Anna Seniuk (born 17 November 1942, in Stanisławów) is a Polish actress.

After World War II, together with other Poles from Stanisławów, she was forced by the Soviet government to leave her hometown, settling in the town of Zator, near Oświęcim. In 1964 Seniuk graduated from Państwowa Wyższa Szkoła Teatralna (Academy for the Dramatic Arts) in Kraków and debuted in the renowned Helena Modrzejewska (Old Theatre). In the early 1970s, she moved to Warsaw, where she played in several theatres. Since 2003, she has been working there at the National Theatre.

Seniuk is known to Polish viewers mainly for her role of Magda Karwowska in the immensely popular 1970s Polish TV series Czterdziestolatek (The Forty-Year-Old). She has cooperated with Polish Radio and has been featured in more than 40 radio shows. Among her most famous film roles, there are appearances in such productions as Europa Europa, Potop and The Maids of Wilko.

== Selected filmography ==
Film
| Year | Title | Role | Notes |
|---|---|---|---|
| 2006 | The Boy on the Galloping Horse | | |
| 1990 | Europa Europa | | |
| 1982 | Konopielka | | |
| 1980 | The Moth | | |
| 1979 | The Maids of Wilko | | |
| 1974 | The Deluge | | |
| 1968 | The Doll | | |

TV
| Year | Title | Role | Notes |
|---|---|---|---|
| 2011-2012 | Wszyscy kochają Romana | | |
| 1974-1977 | Czterdziestolatek | | |
| 1973 | Czarne Chmury | | |
| 1967 | Stawka większa niż życie | | |
