= Manhunt (2012 film) =

2012 Polish film

- Polish: Obława
- Directed by: Marcin Krzyształowicz
- Written by: Marcin Krzyształowicz
- Produced by: Małgorzata Jurczak; Krzysztof Grędziński
- Starring: Marcin Dorociński; Maciej Stuhr; Sonia Bohosiewicz; Weronika Rosati; Andrzej Zieliński; Bartosz Żukowski
- Cinematography: Arkadiusz Tomiak
- Edited by: Wojciech Mrówczyński; Adam Kwiatek
- Music by: Michał Woźniak
- Production company: Skorpion Arte
- Release date: 19 October 2012 (Theatres in Poland)
- Running time: 88 minutes
- Country: Poland
- Box office: $1.2 million

Manhunt (Polish: Obława) is a 2012 Polish film, which was named Best Film at the 2013 Polish Film Awards.

The World War II drama, set in Poland, was directed by Marcin Krzyształowicz, and its primary actors include Marcin Dorociński, Maciej Stuhr, Weronika Rosati (nominated for Polish Academy Award for Best Actress), and Sonia Bohosiewicz. In addition to its Polish Film Awards win for Best Picture, it also won for Best Cinematography, Best Sound Design, and Best Sound Editing.

It also won the Silver Lion prize at the Gdynia Film Festival in May 2012, where it debuted, and was released to Polish theatres generally on 19 October 2012. It was first screened outside Poland at the 2012 Montreal World Film Festival.

== Cast ==
- Marcin Dorociński - Wydra
- Maciej Stuhr - Henryk Kondolewicz
- Sonia Bohosiewicz - Hanna Kondolewiczowa
- Weronika Rosati - Pestka
- Andrzej Zieliński - Mak
- Bartosz Zukowski - Waniek
- Alan Andersz - Rudzielec
- Andrzej Mastalerz - Cook
- Grzegorz Wojdon - Szumlas
- Jacek Strama - Ludwina
