= Krzysztof Majchrzak =

Polish actor

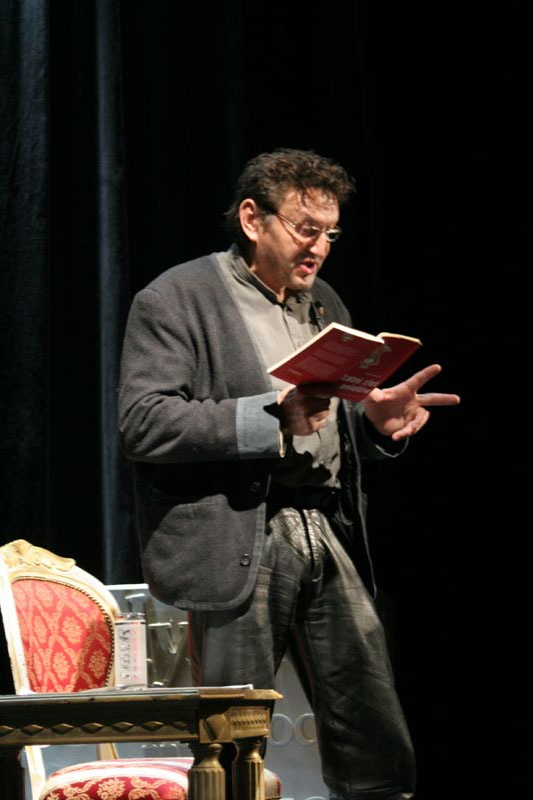
- Majchrzak in 2008
- Born: 2 March 1948 (age 78); Gdańsk, Poland
- Years active: 1975–present

Krzysztof Majchrzak (born 2 March 1948) is a Polish film actor. His first part in a major production was in Andrzej Wajda's The Promised Land (1975). He has appeared in 30 films since 1975. He was nominated for an award as Best Actor for his role in Pornografia at the 2004 Polish Film Awards. Most recently, he appeared in David Lynch's Inland Empire (2006).

== Selected filmography ==
Film
Year	Title	Role	Notes
1982	Konopielka		
1985	O-Bi, O-Ba: The End of Civilization		
1985	Yesterday		
1986	Axiliad		
2001	Quo Vadis		
2002	Where Eskimos Live		
2003	Pornografia		
2006	Inland Empire		
