= Konopielka =

- Directed by: Witold Leszczyński
- Written by: Edward Redliński (novel); Tadeusz Chmielewski; Witold Leszczyński
- Produced by: Tadeusz Drewno
- Starring: Krzysztof Majchrzak; Anna Seniuk
- Cinematography: Zbigniew Napiórkowski
- Music by: Wojciech Karolak
- Production company: Studio Filmowe „Perspektywa”
- Release date: 13 September 1982
- Running time: 92 min
- Country: Poland
- Language: Polish

Konopielka is a 1982 Polish drama film directed by Witold Leszczyński.

== Cast ==
- Krzysztof Majchrzak − Kaziuk Bartoszewicz
- Anna Seniuk − Handzia
- Joanna Sienkiewicz − Nauczycielka Jola
- Tomasz Jarosiński − Ziutek
- Jerzy Block − Józef
- Franciszek Pieczka − Dziad / Bóg
- Jan Paweł Kruk − Dunaj
- Tadeusz Wojtych − Domin
- Sylwester Maciejewski − Żołnierz w motorówce
