= Matthew's Days =

1968 film

- Film poster
- Directed by: Witold Leszczyński
- Written by: Witold Leszczyński; Wojciech Solarz; Tarjei Vesaas
- Starring: Franciszek Pieczka
- Cinematography: Andrzej Kostenko
- Edited by: Zenon Piórecki
- Release date: 16 February 1968
- Running time: 80 minutes
- Country: Poland
- Language: Polish

Matthew's Days (Polish: Żywot Mateusza) is a 1968 Polish drama film directed by Witold Leszczyński. It was listed to compete at the 1968 Cannes Film Festival, but the festival was cancelled due to the events of May 1968 in France. The film was also selected as the Polish entry for the Best Foreign Language Film at the 41st Academy Awards, but was not accepted as a nominee.

The film is based on Tarjei Vesaas' novel The Birds.

== Cast ==
- Franciszek Pieczka - Mateusz
- Anna Milewska - Olga, sister of Mateusz
- Wirgiliusz Gryń - Jan
- Aleksander Fogiel - Host
- Hanna Skarżanka - Hostess
- Małgorzata Braunek - Anna
- Maria Janiec - Ewa
- Elzbieta Nowacka - Girl
- Kazimierz Borowiec - Boy
- Aleksander Iwaniec - Hunter
- Joanna Szczerbic

== See also ==
- List of submissions to the 41st Academy Awards for Best Foreign Language Film
- List of Polish submissions for the Academy Award for Best Foreign Language Film
