= Andrzej Zieliński (actor) =

Polish actor

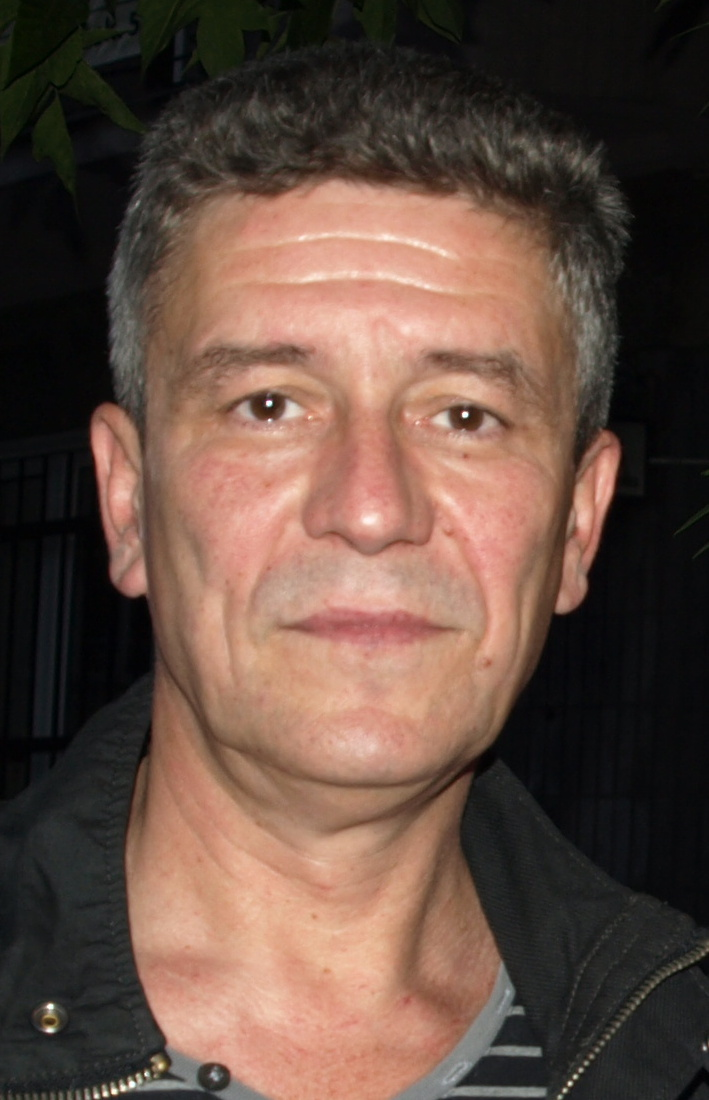
- Born: 14 October 1961 (age 64); Tarnów, Poland
- Occupation: Actor
- Years active: 1985-present

Andrzej Zieliński (born 14 October 1961) is a Polish actor. He appeared in more than forty films since 1985.

== Selected filmography ==
Year	Title	Role	Notes
1985	Yesterday	John	
1994	Blood of the Innocent	Bjelski	
2000	Boys Don't Cry	Silnoręki	
2001	Quo Vadis (2001 film)	Epafrodito	
2002	Chopin: Desire for Love		
2006	We're All Christs		
2012	Obława	Mak	
