= Frost (2017 film) =

2017 film

- Film poster
- Directed by: Šarūnas Bartas
- Written by: Šarūnas Bartas; Anna Cohen-Yanay
- Starring: Mantas Jančiauskas; Lyja Maknavičiūtė; Vanessa Paradis; Weronika Rosati; Andrzej Chyra
- Cinematography: Eitvydas Doškus
- Edited by: Dounia Sichov
- Release dates: 25 May 2017 (Cannes); 18 August 2017 (Lithuania)
- Running time: 90 minutes
- Countries: Lithuania; France; Poland; Ukraine
- Language: Lithuanian
- Box office: $37,081

Frost (Lithuanian: Šerkšnas, Ukrainian: «Іній», romanized: Iniy) is a 2017 internationally co-produced drama film directed by Šarūnas Bartas. It was screened in the Directors' Fortnight section at the 2017 Cannes Film Festival. It was selected as the Lithuanian entry for the Best Foreign Language Film at the 90th Academy Awards, but it was not nominated.

== Plot ==
The young Lithuanian Rokas (played by Jančiauskas) drives with his girlfriend Inga (played by Maknavičiūtė) a humanitarian aid truck to Donbas region of Ukraine where, amid the violence and death of the war in Donbas, they meet different war reporters, one of whom is played by Vanessa Paradis.

== Cast ==
- Mantas Jančiauskas as Rokas
- Lyja Maknavičiūtė as Inga
- Vanessa Paradis
- Weronika Rosati
- Andrzej Chyra

== Production ==
The movie was filmed in frontline towns of Kurakhove, Marinka and Krasnohorivka. Some scenes were filmed as close as 200–300 meters to the frontline. Filming also took place in settings in Kyiv and Dnipro in Ukraine and in Poland and Lithuania.

== Reception ==
On review aggregator Rotten Tomatoes, the film holds an approval rating of 14% based on 7 reviews, with an average rating of 6/10.

== See also ==
- List of submissions to the 90th Academy Awards for Best Foreign Language Film
- List of Lithuanian submissions for the Academy Award for Best Foreign Language Film
