= Revenge (NCIS) =

- NCIS episode
- Episode no.: Season 10; Episode 22
- Directed by: James Whitmore, Jr.
- Written by: George Schenck and Frank Cardea
- Original air date: April 30, 2013

Guest appearances
- Oded Fehr as Ilan Bodnar; Maxwell Caulfield as Dr. Madison Fielding; Stephanie Childers as Mrs. Gillis; Lyn Alicia Henderson as Nurse; Cliff Mark Simon as Ship Captain; Alan Dale as Homeland Senior Division Chief Tom Morrow; Branden Cook as Clive Goddard; Gabi Coccio as young Ziva David

Episode chronology
← Previous "Berlin"	Next → "Double Blind"
- NCIS season 10

"Revenge" is the 22nd episode of the tenth season of the American police procedural drama NCIS and the 232nd episode overall. It originally aired on CBS in the United States on April 30, 2013. The episode is written by George Schenck and Frank Cardea and directed by James Whitmore, Jr., and was seen by 18.29 million viewers.

The story arc was initiated in January when secondary characters Eli David (Michael Nouri) and Jackie Vance (Paula Newsome) were killed off in a shooting at the end of "Shabbat Shalom". Subsequent episodes featured Ziva David and Leon Vance's efforts to find the killer, eventually revealed to be Eli's protégé Ilan Bodnar, and exact vengeance.

In the closing scenes of the previous episode, "Berlin", Tony and Ziva are in a car crash instigated by Bodnar. "Revenge" focuses on the team's hunt for Bodnar against the wishes of Homeland Security, culminating in Vance and Ziva finally getting closure when the latter kills him in a physical fight to the death.

== Plot ==
As the episode opens, Tony and Ziva are semi-conscious in the aftermath of the crash. Bodnar (Oded Fehr) approaches the vehicle and retrieves a parcel of illicit diamonds, despite efforts from a dazed Ziva to stop him.

Later, in the ER, Ziva is anxious to resume the search for Bodnar, despite having sustained injuries and being instructed to halt all fieldwork for the time being. She and DiNozzo sneak out of the hospital and return to NCIS headquarters, questioning Abby about the case's details. Despite Abby’s unwillingness to talk, they are able to deduce the location of the rest of the team.

McGee and Gibbs are shown investigating Bodnar's former hideout and processing the body of a man (Billy House) who had apparently assisted Bodnar in exchange for diamonds in payment. They are unable to identify him through facial recognition and eventually learn that this is due to extensive plastic surgery the man underwent. Tony and McGee locate the surgeon and learn that the man was a South African mercenary named Clive Goddard (Branden Cook).

Ziva begins to undergo intensive training, evidently in hopes of a confrontation with Bodnar, including forcing herself to practice boxing with an injured shoulder. Homeland Senior Division Chief Tom Morrow (Alan Dale) demands that Vance rein in Ziva's efforts and leave the case to Homeland Security. Vance is reluctant to accept this but mildly suggests to Ziva that she back down.

Bodnar contacts Ziva at NCIS and insists that, while he was responsible for the deaths of Eli David and Jackie Vance, he did not kill the Iranian ambassador. McGee is able to pinpoint the area in the background of Bodnar's video as a park in New York and alerts Homeland. However, they quickly realize that the video was a ploy to throw them off and that the background was staged.

Ziva, meanwhile, manages to figure out Bodnar's true location from a note attached to Goddard and confronts him on a ship about to depart. Bodnar insists that he will not be apprehended, and when Ziva refuses to shoot him unarmed, a fight ensues. The team, having become aware of Ziva's absence, rushes to the scene in time to see Bodnar fall to his death. In the closing scene, Ziva is taken to Vance's office, where she tells him that "it's over."

== Production ==
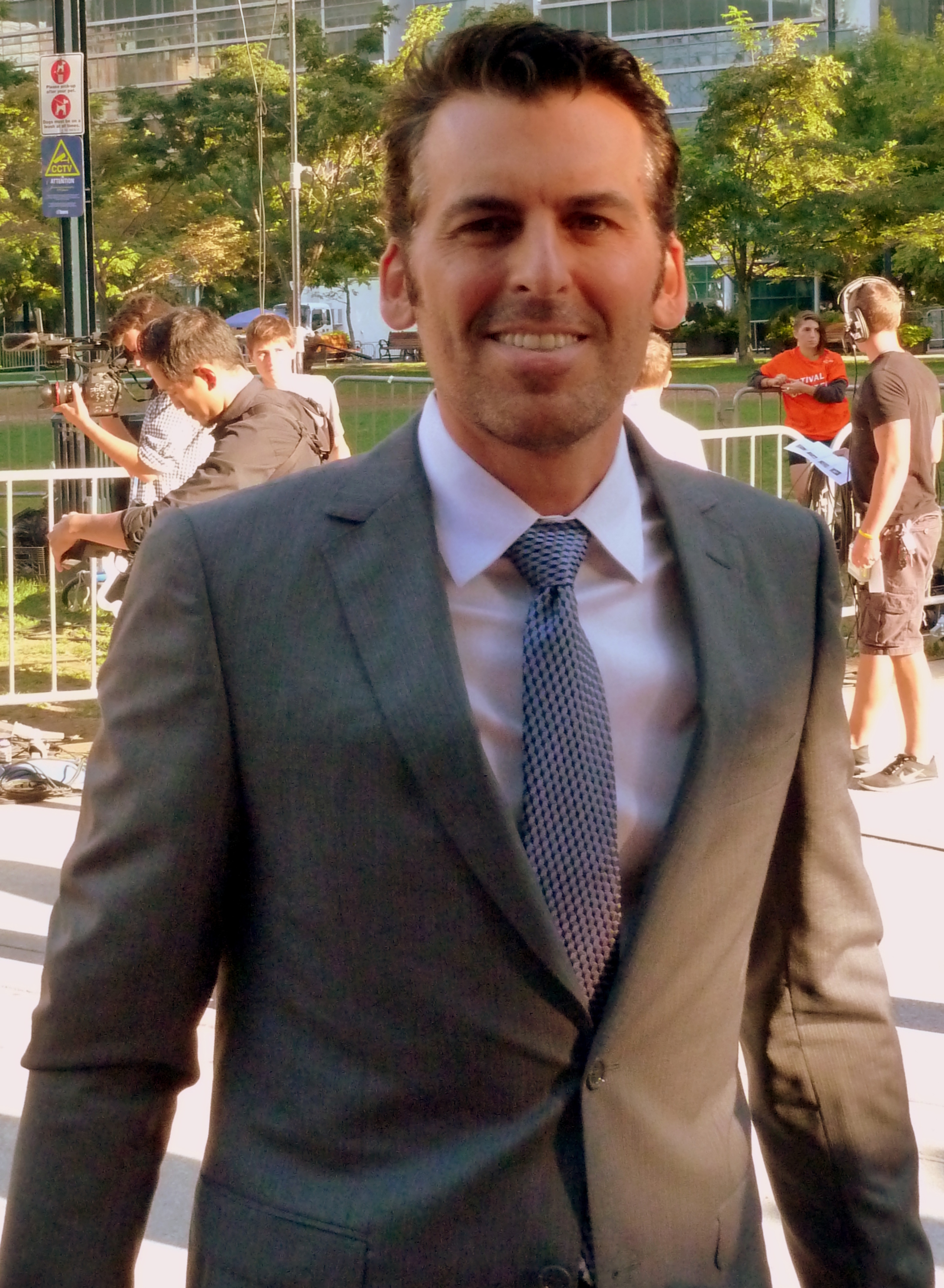
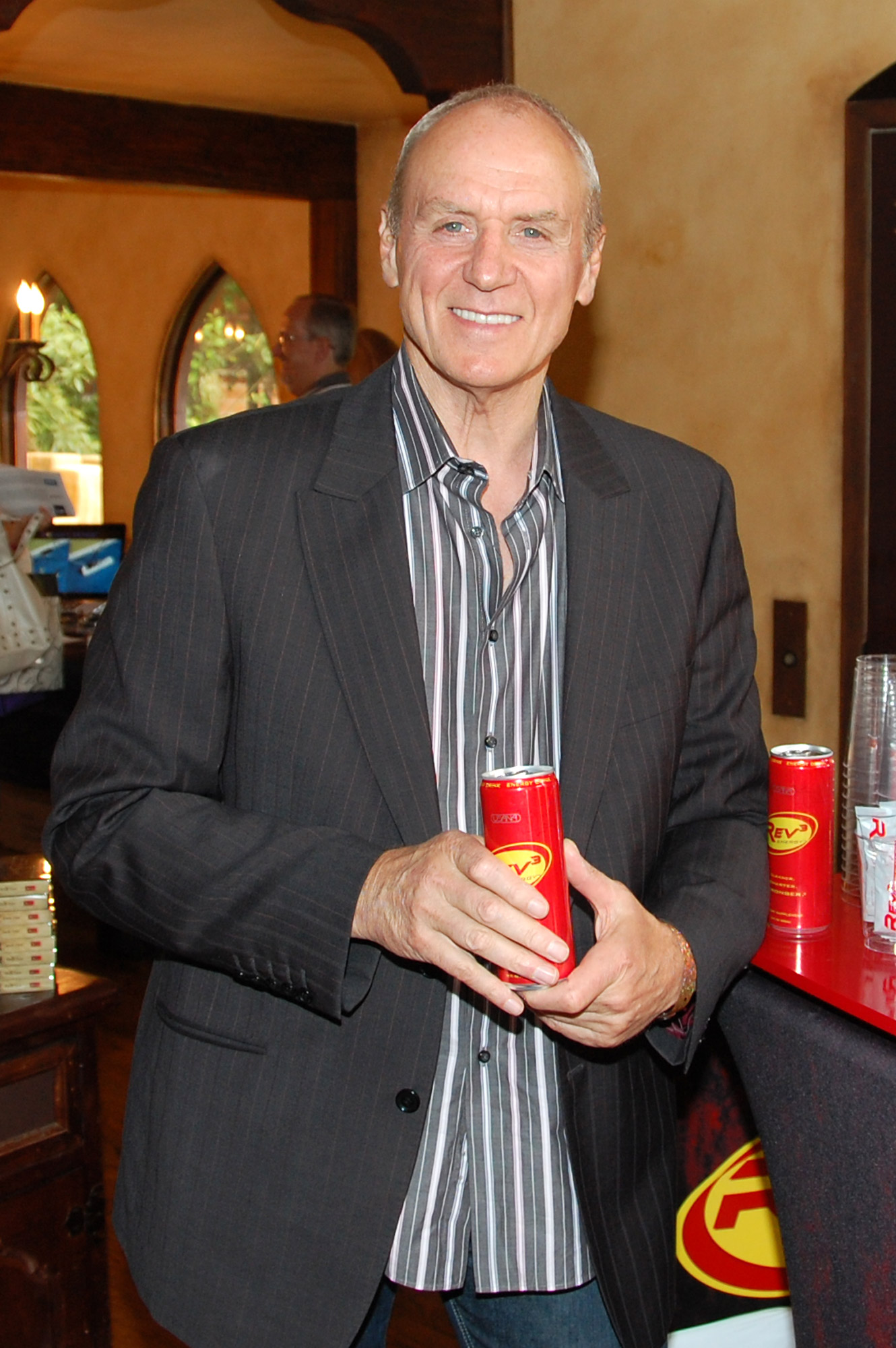
Oded Fehr (left) and Alan Dale (right) returned in the episode.

"Revenge" is written by George Schenck and Frank Cardea and directed by James Whitmore, Jr. The episode is the second part of a 4-episode act ending the 10th season. Originally the writers intended the first part "to end after the crash, with Ilan Bodnar taking the diamonds and driving away, [and] Ziva shooting after him", but during post production parts of the ending of "Berlin" was moved to the cold opening of "Revenge". The reason for this move was because the writers now felt the ending in "Berlin" would be a "much stronger cliffhanger on "Tiva", the mystery of Tony and Ziva’s fate".

Another change was done with early drafts of the scrip when the fight between Ziva and Bodnar aboard the ship changed from day to night. Mark Harmon asked the writers "if [they] didn't think it would play better at night", and they agreed.

In August 2012, Cote de Pablo, who portrays Ziva, admitted to missing aspects of her character that were more prevalent in earlier seasons. She elaborated, "I'm going into my eighth season so I do believe that much like me, Cote, who has gone through a whirlwind of changes in these past eight years...I think the character has also changed. She came with a little bit more of an edge, she trusted people less, she had a little bit more violence in her. Those are the things that I actually miss about the character. The character to me has gotten a little bit softer, perhaps more inclined to listen before acting out - and that's one of the things that I noticed. However, I don't know if it's an actual positive for me because I really like the old, old Ziva." Before the episode aired, showrunner Gary Glasberg hinted that "Revenge" would delve into this somewhat, remarking, "it really gives Ziva fans an opportunity to see a strong, determined, relentless Ziva David that they haven't seen in a while."

"For Ziva, it's not just about her father, or the ghost of her father. It's about her brother, and her sister, and her country, and who she is. And even though she's a naturalized American citizen, what beats inside the Ziva character is a fundamentally conflicted and inconsolable creature."

— Michael Weatherly

Oded Fehr returned as ex-mossad deputy director Ilan Bodnar, making it his third appearance this season. Alan Dale also returned as Homeland Senior Division Chief Tom Morrow.

== Reception ==
"Revenge" was seen by 18.29 million live viewers following its broadcast on April 30, 2013, with a 3.1/10 share among adults aged 18 to 49. A rating point represents one percent of the total number of television sets in American households, and a share means the percentage of television sets in use tuned to the program. In total viewers, "Revenge" easily won NCIS and CBS the night. The spin-off NCIS: Los Angeles drew second and was seen by 13.07 million viewers. Compared to the last episode "Berlin", "Revenge" was up in viewers and adults 18–49.

Douglas Wolfe from TV Fanatic gave the episode 4.8/5 and stated that "Once again, the writers for NCIS have done a tremendous job. They kept us guessing all the way through. [...] All in all, this was a great episode. The final scene was just about as perfect as it gets. Ziva, battered and bruised, walking into Vance's office. Vance struggling with his warring emotions over his concern for her, and his need to know if Bodnar was dead."

Laurel Brown from Zap2it criticized the relatively mild nature of Tony and Ziva's injuries following the crash, believing that the damage should have been more severe.

A reviewer from TV Overmind wrote, "I was a little saddened by Ziva’s actions throughout the episode. No matter how many steps she takes toward a happier life she always seems to be flung backwards whenever her family or past connections to Mossad resurface. Watching her punch her way through the pain of a dislocated shoulder in order to prove to herself that she was in control of her own body was such a desperate but pointless exercise...In general 'Revenge' was a good episode. The storyline was solid as usual and Cote De Pablo always delivers the goods when she is portraying her characters dramatic side. She manages to slide smoothly between vengeful agent and emotionally shattered daughter which leaves me in awe of her acting skills."

Michelle Calbert from BuddyTV included "Shiva" in her list of "The 10 Best Ziva Episodes" and said, "In this episode, Ziva and the rest of the team have had a fairly long while to deal with the deaths of both her father and Vance's wife. All of them want justice for the man behind the murders, but it's Ziva who wants revenge. Even after being injured in a car accident, Ziva doesn't let that [stop her] from going after Bodnar and ultimately ending his life by her own hand (though she may deny it in later episodes)."
