= Body (2015 Polish film) =

2015 Polish film

- Film poster
- Directed by: Małgorzata Szumowska
- Written by: Michal Englert; Małgorzata Szumowska
- Starring: Janusz Gajos; Maja Ostaszewska
- Release dates: 9 February 2015 (Berlin); 6 March 2015 (Poland)
- Running time: 75 minutes
- Country: Poland
- Language: Polish
- Box office: $10,227

Body (Polish: Ciało) is a 2015 Polish drama film directed by Małgorzata Szumowska. It was screened in the main competition section of the 65th Berlin International Film Festival where Szumowska won the Silver Bear for Best Director. The film also received the Golden Lions Award at the 2015 Gdynia Film Festival and the People's Choice Award at the 2016 European Film Awards.

== Plot ==
Olga who struggles with anorexia is sent to psychiatric hospital by the Attorney, where she is treated by Anna - a therapist who believes herself to be able to communicate with ghosts. Anna insists that she has been in contact with Olga's dead mother and she asks the Attorney to participate in a séance.

== Cast ==
- Janusz Gajos as Attorney
- Maja Ostaszewska as Anna
- Justyna Suwala as Olga, attorney's daughter
- Wladyslaw Kowalski as Władysław
- Adam Woronowicz as director Zieliński
- Tomasz Ziętek as attorney's assistant
- Malgorzata Hajewska as Karol's mother
- Ewa Kolasinska as a nurse
- Ada Piekarska, as Ada
- Ewa Dalkowska as the prosecutor's friend

== Reception ==
On review aggregator website Rotten Tomatoes, the film has an 89% approval rating based on 9 reviews with an average rating of 6.9/10.
