= Yesterday (1985 film) =

1985 Polish film

- Directed by: Radosław Piwowarski
- Written by: Radosław Piwowarski
- Produced by: Jerzy Szebesta, Zespół Filmowy Rondo
- Starring: Piotr Siwkiewicz
- Cinematography: Witold Adamek
- Edited by: Irena Choryńska
- Release date: 10 June 1985
- Running time: 87 minutes
- Country: Poland
- Language: Polish

Yesterday is a 1985 Polish drama film directed by Radosław Piwowarski. The film was selected as the Polish entry for the Best Foreign Language Film at the 58th Academy Awards, but was not accepted as a nominee.

== Cast ==
- Piotr Siwkiewicz as Pawel Mitura 'Ringo'
- Anna Kaźmierczak as Ania
- Andrzej Zieliński as John
- Krzysztof Majchrzak as Biegacz
- Krystyna Feldman as Ciotka
- Henryk Bista as Dyrector
- Waldemar Ignaczak as George
- Robert Piechota as Paul
- Stanislaw Brudny as Ksiacz

== See also ==
- List of submissions to the 58th Academy Awards for Best Foreign Language Film
- List of Polish submissions for the Academy Award for Best Foreign Language Film
