= Anna Milewska =

Polish actress

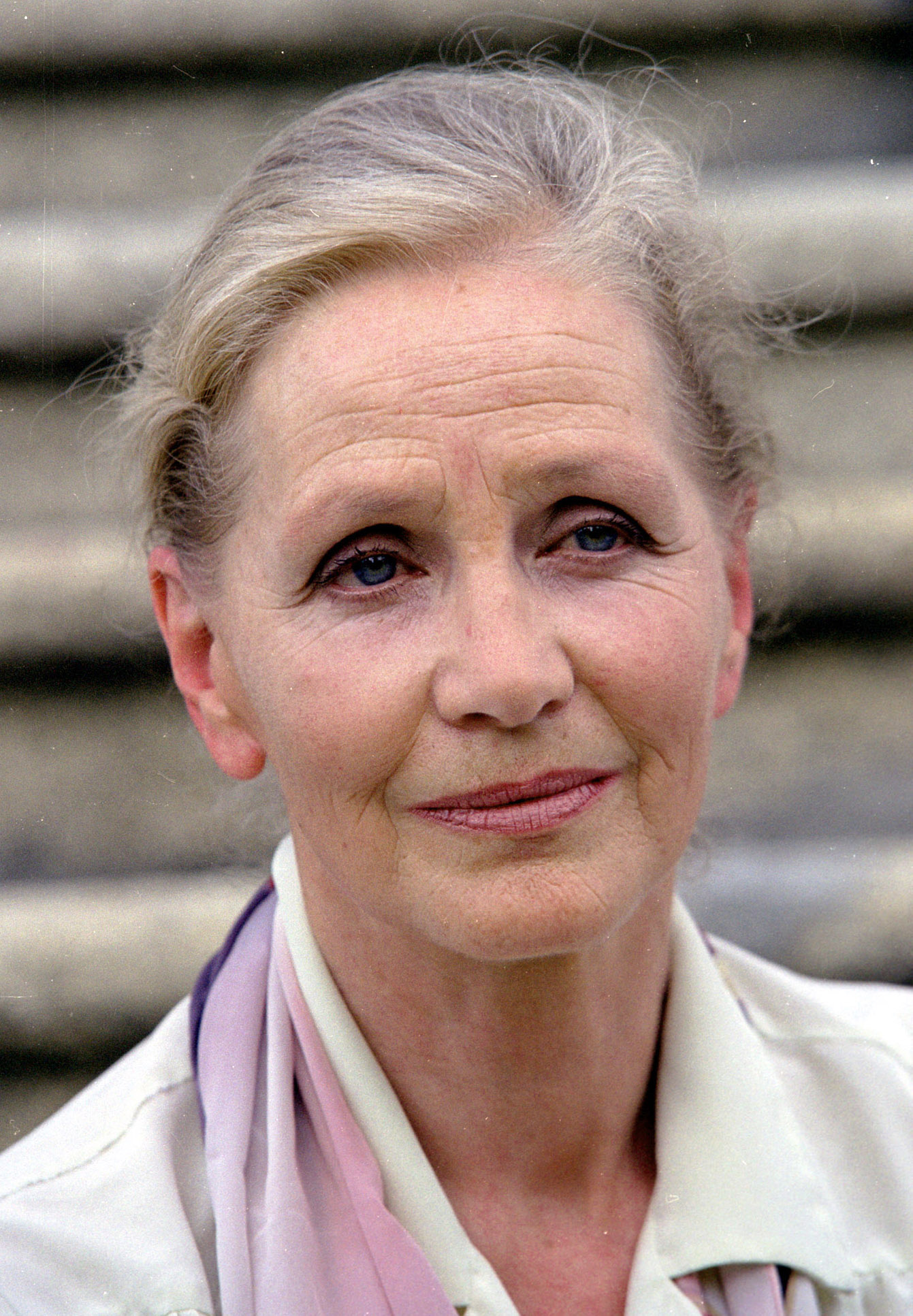
Anna Milewska

Anna Julia Milewska-Zawada (born 21 February 1931 in Warsaw) is a Polish film and theatre actress, best known for her roles in the films Lalka (1978), and Kogel-mogel (1988). She has been the recipient of the Cross of Merit in 1978, the Order of Polonia Restituta in 1986, and the Medal of the 40th Anniversary of People's Poland in 1985.
