= Chasing Ghosts (NCIS) =

- NCIS episode
- Episode no.: Season 10; Episode 20
- Directed by: Arvin Brown
- Written by: Nicole Mirante-Matthews
- Original air date: April 9, 2013

Guest appearances
- Sophina Brown as Callie Daniels; Brian Leckner as Ben; Lourdes Benedicto as Rebecca Chidis; Arron Shiver as Landers Orton; Rupert Reid as Noah Daniels; Alan Dale as Homeland Senior Division Chief Tom Morrow

Episode chronology
← Previous "Squall"	Next → "Berlin"
- NCIS season 10

"Chasing Ghosts" is the 20th episode of the tenth season of the American police procedural drama NCIS, and the 230th episode overall. It originally aired on CBS in the United States on April 9, 2013. The episode is written by Nicole Mirante-Matthews and directed by Arvin Brown, and was seen by 17.22 million viewers.

While the team takes a missing persons case, Tony is disturbed by Ziva's way of coping with her father's death.

== Plot ==
The civilian husband of Navy Lieutenant Callie Daniels, Noah Daniels has disappeared, forcing her to call NCIS for help. The team search for Noah but find the kidnapping case becoming increasingly complicated while Tony soon discovers that Ziva has been searching for Ilan Bodnar, the man responsible for her father's death with McGee secretly aiding her.

== Production ==
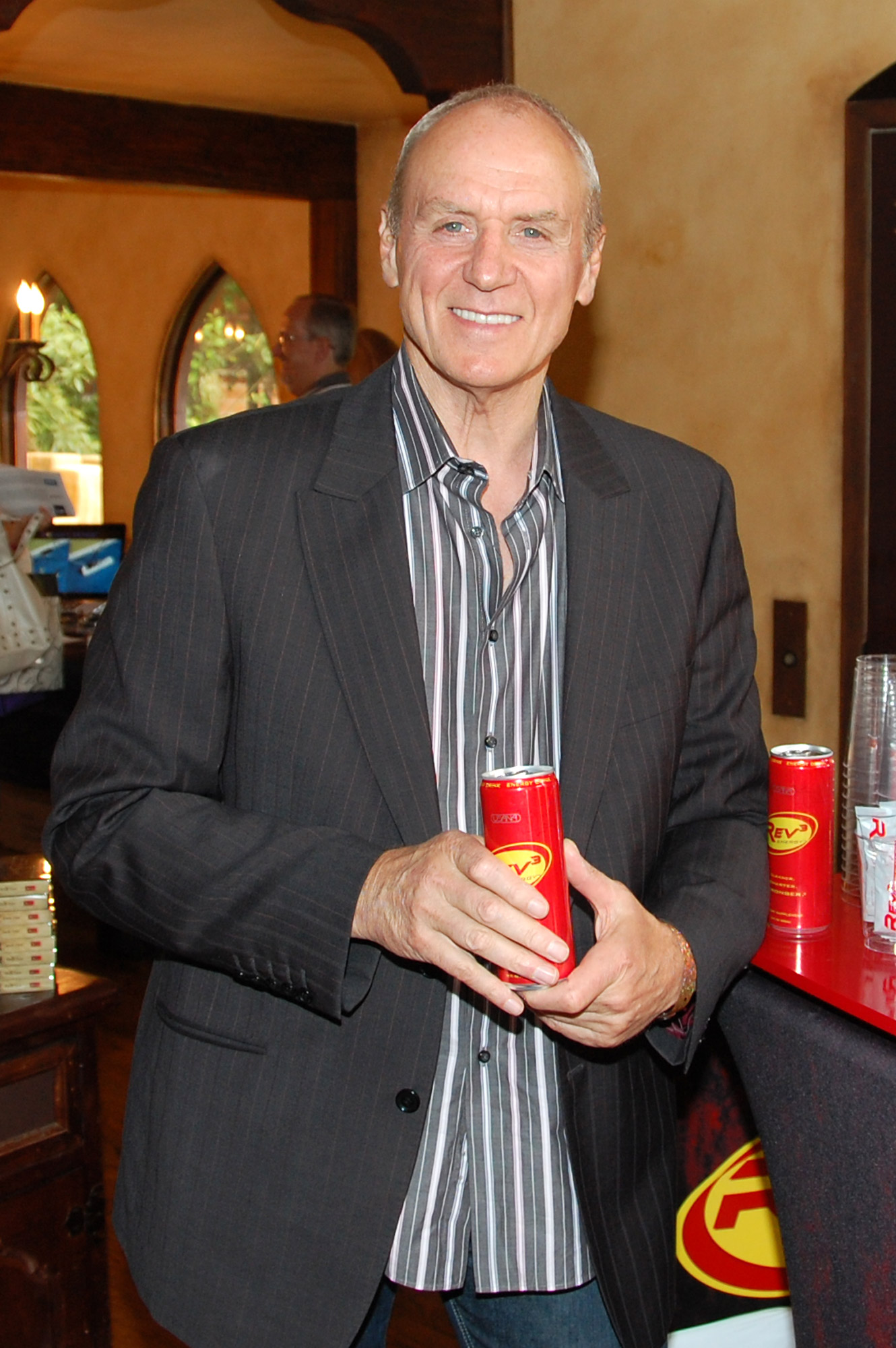
Alan Dale reprised his role as Tom Morrow, last seen in the season 3 premiere "Kill Ari (Part I)".

"Chasing Ghosts" was written by Nicole Mirante-Matthews and directed by Arvin Brown. "Ziva's need for closure takes over", Mirante-Matthews said about the episode. The only way for Ziva to find closure is by finding Ilan Bodnar, the one responsible for the death of her father. "Her hunt starts now", Mirante-Matthews continued.

The episode also included a woman's search for her missing husband, which, according to Mirante-Matthews, "[balanced] Ziva's search for Bodnar [against the woman's]".

Alan Dale reprised his role as Tom Morrow, now a chief in the Homeland Senior Division. His last appearance on NCIS was in the season 3 episode "Kill Ari (Part I)", where he resigned as NCIS director.

== Reception ==
"Chasing Ghosts" was seen by 17.22 million live viewers following its broadcast on April 9, 2013, with a 2.7/8 share among adults aged 18 to 49. A rating point represents one percent of the total number of television sets in American households, and a share means the percentage of television sets in use tuned to the program. In total viewers, "Chasing Ghosts" easily won NCIS and CBS the night. The spin-off NCIS: Los Angeles drew second and was seen by 14.10 million viewers. Compared to the last episode "Squall", "Chasing Ghosts" was down in viewers and adults 18–49.

Douglas Wolfe from TV Fanatic gave the episode 4.5/5 and stated that "this was one of those installments where the last 10 minutes were the most compelling. [...] Finally we saw most of the NCIS gang find a way to support Ziva's hunt for Bodnar."
