= Małgorzata Szumowska =

Polish film director (born 1973)

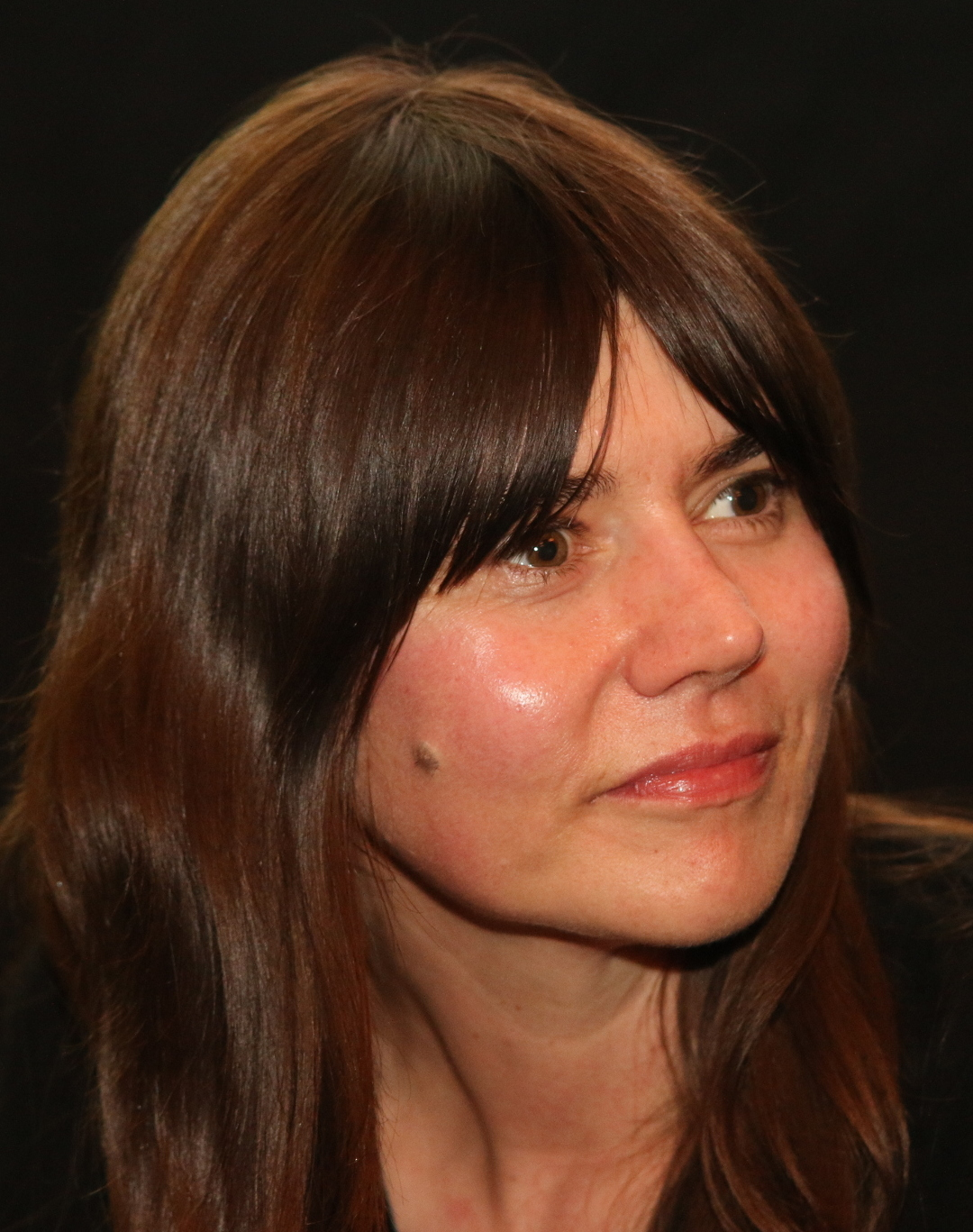
- Małgorzata Szumowska at the GoEast Film Festival in Wiesbaden, 2014
- Born: 26 February 1973 (age 53); Kraków, Poland
- Occupations: film director, screenwriter, producer
- Spouse: Mateusz Kościukiewicz
- Awards: Jury Grand Prix (2018); Silver Bear for Best Director (2015); Teddy Award (2013)

Małgorzata Szumowska (Polish: [mawɡɔˈʐata ʂuˈmɔfska]; born 26 February 1973) is a Polish film director, screenwriter and producer, born in Kraków.

Her 2013 film In the Name Of received the Teddy Award for Best Feature at the 63rd Berlin International Film Festival, and received the Grand Prix at the 32nd annual Istanbul Film Festival. Her film Body was selected to be screened in the main competition section of the 65th Berlin International Film Festival. Szumowska won the Silver Bear for Best Director for Body. In 2018, she received Jury Grand Prix at the 68th Berlin International Film Festival for her film Mug.

== Career ==
Szumowska spent two years studying history of art at the Jagiellonian University before she started film studies. Szumowska graduated from the National Film School in Łódź. As a student, Szumowska made a short which was ranked 14th in the history of Łódź Film School. Cisza (Silence) is a short documentary film in which Szumowska tried to capture a simple life of a Polish rural family.

In 2001, she became a member of the European Film Academy. In 2016, she was a member of the jury headed by Meryl Streep at the 66th Berlin International Film Festival. In 2018, she was also selected as a member of the jury headed by Guillermo del Toro at the 75th Venice International Film Festival.

In 2020, her film co-directed with Michał Englert Never Gonna Snow Again was selected as the Polish entry for the Best International Feature Film at the 93rd Academy Awards.

=== Szczęśliwy człowiek (Happy man) ===
Szumowska graduated from the film college in 1998 and made her debut feature film Szczęśliwy człowiek (Happy Man) in 2001. The film was nominated for the European Film Award and Szumowska became a member of the European Film Academy in the same year. The plot explores complicated relationships among three people facing enormous difficulties who nonetheless strive to achieve happiness, or, at least, steer clear of tragedy.

=== Ono (Stranger) ===
Her next film, Ono (Stranger), focused on the relationship between a pregnant woman and the baby she is expecting. Having decided not to have an abortion, the mother tries to prepare her child for the experience of the outside world. Things get complicated when the woman faces health problems.

=== Ojciec (Father) ===
In 2005 Szumowska made a short film Ojciec (Father), one of thirteen contemporary stories written by Polish film directors to celebrate Solidarity which made up the film Solidarność, Solidarność (Solidarity, Solidarity). Based on her father's experiences, Szumowska's film uses archival footage from his documentaries.

=== 33 sceny z życia (33 Scenes from Life) ===
A significant breakthrough in Szumowska's career came in 2008, with 33 sceny z życia (33 Scenes from Life), starring Julia Jentsch, which won a Special Prize at the Locarno International Film Festival. Inspired by her own life, but, as she is careful to emphasize, "not autobiographical", the film tells the story of Julia. A talented photographer married to Piotr, a successful composer, Julia has a perfect and financially comfortable life until one day the idyll is interrupted.

=== Elles ===
Szumowska worked also as a co-producer of Antichrist, Lars von Trier's horror film released in 2009. In 2011, she completed her international project, Elles, starring Juliette Binoche. The worldwide première of Elles took place at Toronto International Film Festival. It tells the story of Anne, a Parisian journalist investigating prostitution among the students. Her research takes her to two girls, Charlotte and Alice, whose lives differ greatly from her own. They let her discover a world which she finds both repulsive and seductive.

=== In the Name Of ===
Szumowska directed the 2013 film In the Name Of. In the film, Adam is a Catholic priest who discovered his calling as a servant of God at the relatively late age of 21. He now lives in a village in rural Poland where he works with teenagers with behavioral problems who fight and yell abuse. He declines the advances of a young brunette named Ewa; saying he is already spoken for. However; celibacy is not the only reason for his rejection. Adam knows that he desires men and that his embrace of the priesthood has been a flight from his own sexuality. When he meets Dynia; the strange and taciturn son of a simple rural family; Adam's self-imposed abstinence becomes a heavy burden.

== Personal life ==
Szumowska is the daughter of journalists Maciej Szumowski and Dorota Terakowska and the sister of Wojciech Szumowski, a documentary film director. She has been married to actor Mateusz Kościukiewicz since 2011. They have one daughter Alina born on 3 December 2012. She has a son Maciej from a previous relationship with the editor Jacek Drosio.

== Filmography ==
- Happy Man (2000)
- Stranger (2004)
- 33 Scenes from Life (2008)
- Elles (2011)
- In the Name Of (2013)
- Body (2015)
- Mug (2018)
- The Other Lamb (2019)
- Never Gonna Snow Again (2020) (co-directed with Michał Englert)
- Infinite Storm (2022) (co-directed with Michał Englert)
- Woman Of... (2023) (co-directed with Michał Englert)
- The Idiot(s) (2026) (co-directed with Michał Englert)
