= Witold Leszczyński =

Polish film director

- Born: 16 August 1933; Łódź, Poland
- Died: 1 September 2007 (aged 74); Łódź, Poland
- Occupations: Film director Screenwriter
- Years active: 1959-2007

Witold Leszczyński (16 August 1933 – 1 September 2007) was a Polish film director and screenwriter. In 1967 he graduated from the National Film School in Łódź.

== Career ==
He directed over thirty films between 1959 and 2007. Most known for Żywot Mateusza (Matthew's Days) based on a novel by Norwegian writer Tarjei Vesaas, Konopielka, adapted from the novel of Edward Redliński, Siekierezada based on a novel by Edward Stachura and many others films.

He received numerous awards, including Grand Prix at the Polish Film Festival in 1986.

== Death ==
The director died during the shoot of his film Stary człowiek i pies (The Old Man and the Dog) in 2007.

== Filmography ==
- Requiem (2001)
- Koloss (1993)
- Siekierezada (1986)
- Konopielka (1982)
- Przemysłowy Instytut Elektroniki '78 (1978)
- Rekolekcje (1978)
- Rewizja osobista (1973)
- Qu'est-ce qui fait courir Jacky? (1969)
- Żywot Mateusza (1968)
- Zabawa (1961)
- Skowronek (1960)
- Portret mężczyzny z medalionem (1959)
