= 33 Scenes from Life =

- Film poster
- Polish: 33 sceny z życia
- Directed by: Małgorzata Szumowska
- Starring: Julia Jentsch; Peter Gantzler; Maciej Stuhr
- Release date: November 7, 2008
- Running time: 100 minutes
- Country: Poland
- Language: Polish
- Box office: $ 870 504

33 Scenes from Life (Polish: 33 sceny z życia) is a 2008 Polish film directed by Małgorzata Szumowska.

== Plot ==
The Polish artist Julia and her husband Piotr, a talented and successful composer, live in Kraków. When Julias's mother, Barbara falls ill with stomach cancer, the life of the family is falling apart. Julia accompanies her mother to death, but her husband Piotr is at rehearsals in Cologne and leaves her to cope with this difficult situation. Only her friend Adrian is at her side. Her father Jurek is also overwhelmed by the impending loss of his beloved wife. After the death of the mother her father takes comfort from alcohol. Shortly after the father dies. Julia found only in the arms of Adrian to rest, but this in turn destroyed her marriage to Piotr. After the loss of the parents and breakup of the marriage she is now alone in the world with an uncertain future where Adrian is of little help.

== Cast ==
Actor	Role
Julia Jentsch	Julia
Maciej Stuhr	Piotr
Peter Gantzler	Adrian
Izabela Kuna	Kaśka
Małgorzata Hajewska	Barbara
Andrzej Hudziak	Jurek
