= Radosław Piwowarski =

Polish film director, screenwriter and actor

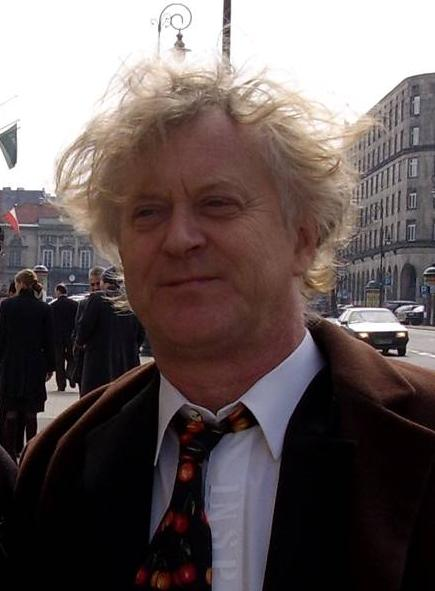
- Piwowarski in 2007
- Born: 20 February 1948 (age 78); Bielsko-Biała, Poland
- Education: National Film School in Łódź
- Occupations: Film director, screenwriter, actor
- Years active: 1969–
- Children: Cyprian, Kordian

Radosław Piwowarski (born 20 February 1948, Bielsko-Biała) is a Polish film director, screenwriter and actor.

== Life and career ==
He was born on 20 February 1948 in Olszówka Dolna, a district of Bielsko-Biała in southern Poland. In 1971, he graduated from the National Film School in Łódź. Between 1972 and 1981, he was a member of the Zespół Filmowy „X” film studio headed by renowned filmmaker Andrzej Wajda. Since 1998 until 2003, he served as director of the TVP1 Channel. He is a member of the Polish Film Academy.

His 1985 film Yesterday was awarded the Golden Shell at the San Sebastián International Film Festival, Golden Tulip at the International Istanbul Film Festival and was selected as the Polish entry for the Best Foreign Language Film at the 58th Academy Awards, but was not accepted as a nominee. In 1993, his film Kolejność uczuć won Golden Lions at the 18th Gdynia Film Festival.

== Personal life ==
He is the son of painter Monika Piwowarska and sculptor Edward Piwowarski. He has two sons Kordian and Cyprian.

== Filmography ==
- CDN (1975)
- Ciuciubabka (1977)
- Córka albo syn (1979)
- Jan Serce (1981)
- Yesterday (1984)
- Kochankowie mojej mamy (1985)
- Pociąg do Hollywood (1987)
- Marcowe migdały (1989)
- Aby do świtu... (1992)
- Kolejność uczuć (1993)
- Autoportret z kochanką (1996)
- Ciemna strona Wenus (1997)
- Złotopolscy, TV series (1997-2010)
- Palce lizać (1999)
- Lokatorzy, TV series (2002-2005)
- Królowa chmur w Święta polskie (2003)
- Stacyjka (2004)
- Na dobre i na złe, TV series (2005-2008)
- Kopciuszek, TV series (2006-2007)
- Szpilki na Giewoncie, TV series, season 4 (2012)
- Hotel 52, TV series, season 6 and 7 (2012-2013)
