= The Order of Feelings =

1993 film written and directed by Radosław Piwowarski

- Polish: Kolejność uczuć
- Directed by: Radosław Piwowarski
- Written by: Radosław Piwowarski
- Starring: Daniel Olbrychski, Maria Seweryn
- Cinematography: Witold Adamek
- Edited by: Wanda Zeman
- Music by: Jerzy Satanowski
- Release date: 1993

The Order of Feelings (Polish: Kolejność uczuć) is a 1993 film written and directed by Radosław Piwowarski. The film received Golden Lions at the Polish Film Festival in 1993, ex-aequo with The Pekosiński's Case.

== Cast ==
Source.

- Daniel Olbrychski as Rafał Nawrot
- Maria Seweryn as Julia Kasprusiak
- Eugeniusz Priwieziencew as Karol, father of Julia
- Wojciech Siemion as theatre's director
