= Michał Englert =

Polish cinematographer and screenwriter (born 1975)

- Born: 4 May 1975 (age 51); Warsaw, Poland
- Education: National Film School in Łódź
- Occupations: Cinematographer; screenwriter
- Notable work: Body
- Mother: Marta Lipińska
- Relatives: Jan Englert (uncle); Helena Englert (cousin)

Michał Englert (Polish: [ˈmixaw ˈɛŋɡlɛrt]; born 4 May 1975) is a Polish cinematographer and screenwriter from Warsaw.

He graduated from the cinematography department of the National Film School in Łódź.

He is the son of Polish actress Marta Lipińska and actor and stage director Maciej Englert. Actor Jan Englert is his uncle.

== Awards ==
- 2008: Gdynia Film Festival award for best cinematography for 33 Scenes from Life.
- 2016: Polish Academy Award for Best Cinematography, for Body
- 2016: Polish Academy Award for Best Screenplay, for Body
