= Koterski =

Koterski (feminine Koterska) is a Polish surname. Notable people include:

- Joseph Koterski (1953–2021), American Jesuit priest
- Marek Koterski (born 1942), Polish film director
- Michał Koterski (born 1979), Polish actor
