= Adaś Miauczyński =

Fictional character created by Marek Koterski

- First appearance: Dom wariatów; 1984
- Last appearance: 7 uczuć; 2018
- Created by: Marek Koterski
- Portrayed by: Marek Kondrat; Wojciech Wysocki; Krzysztof Kowalewski; Bartosz Opania; Zbigniew Rola; Cezary Pazura; Franciszek Barciś; Andrzej Chyra; Bogdan Smagacki; Adam Woronowicz; Michał Koterski

In-universe information
- Alias: Michał Miauczyński
- Occupation: Teacher; Film director; Literary critic; Researcher
- Spouse: Beata Miauczynska
- Children: Ania, Sylwester
- Nationality: Polish

Adaś Miauczyński is a fictional character created by Marek Koterski. He has featured in a series of films and stage works as well as a musical. Adaś (in two films, he is presented as Michał Miauczyński) is a Polish man whose first name, Adaś, is a diminutive form of Adam, while Miauczyński is a wordplay derived from "meow", a sound produced by cats. He is a vulgar, neurotic, and frustrated intellectual who either lives alone or with his ex-wife, and sometimes with his children.

The character has appeared in nine feature films: Dom wariatów (1984), Życie wewnętrzne (1987), Porno (1989), Nothing Funny (1995), Ajlawju (1999), Day of the Wacko (2002), We're All Christs (2006), Baby są jakieś inne (2011), and 7 uczuć (2018). Each story showcases a different aspect or era of his life, often with little continuity between them. He has been portrayed by different actors, both on stage and onscreen.

In 2017, a musical about Miauczyński, based on Day of the Wacko, was released.

== Film series ==
- Dom wariatów – portrayed by Marek Kondrat (1984)
- Życie wewnętrzne – portrayed by Wojciech Wysocki (1987)
- Porno – portrayed by Zbigniew Rola (1989)
- Nothing Funny – portrayed by Cezary Pazura/Franciszek Barciś (1995)
- Ajlawju – portrayed by Cezary Pazura (1999)
- Day of the Wacko – portrayed by Marek Kondrat (2002)
- We're All Christs – portrayed by Andrzej Chyra / Marek Kondrat (2006)
- Baby są jakieś inne – portrayed by Adam Woronowicz (2011)
- 7 uczuć – portrayed by Michał Koterski (2018)

== Gallery ==
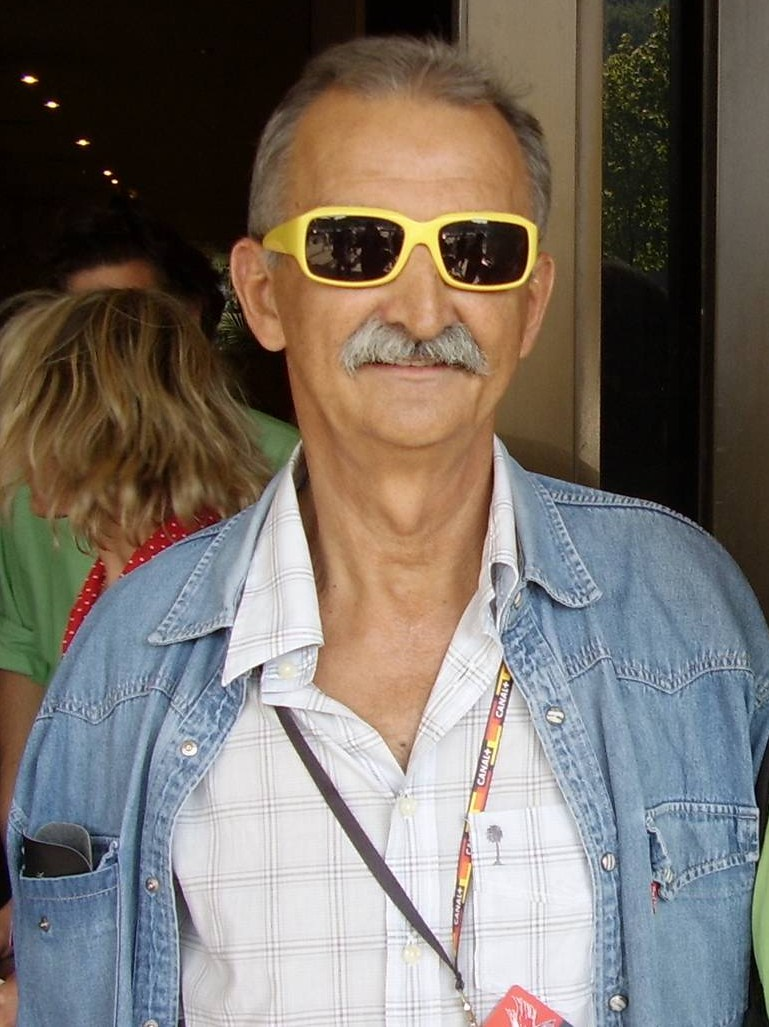
Marek Koterski is the creator of Adaś Miauczyński

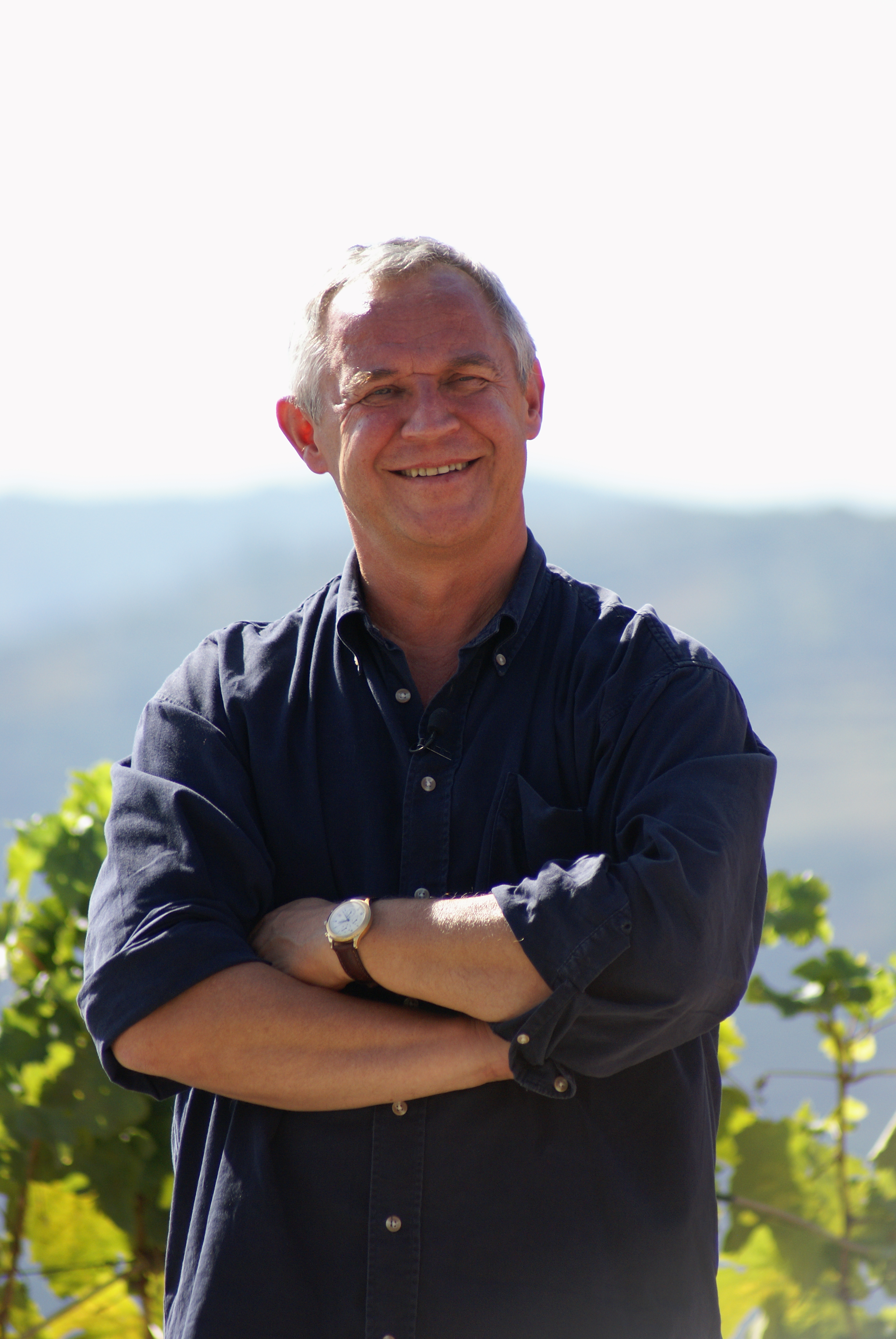
Marek Kondrat portrayed Adaś in three films

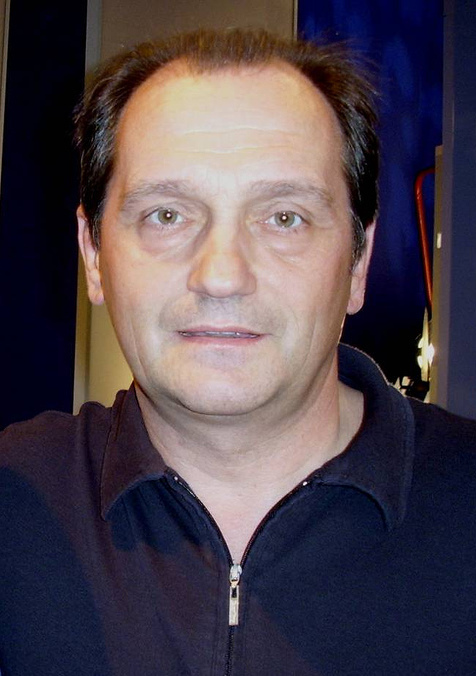
Wojciech Wysocki portrayed Adaś in Życie wewnętrzne

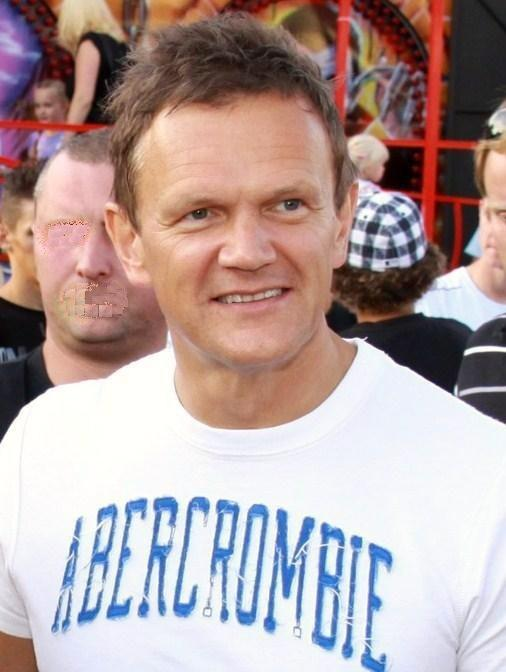
Cezary Pazura portrayed Adaś in two films

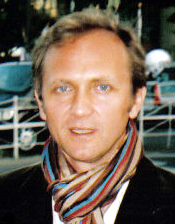
Andrzej Chyra portrayed Adaś in We're All Christs

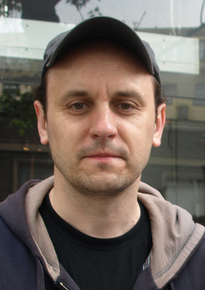
Adam Woronowicz portrayed Adaś in Baby są jakieś inne

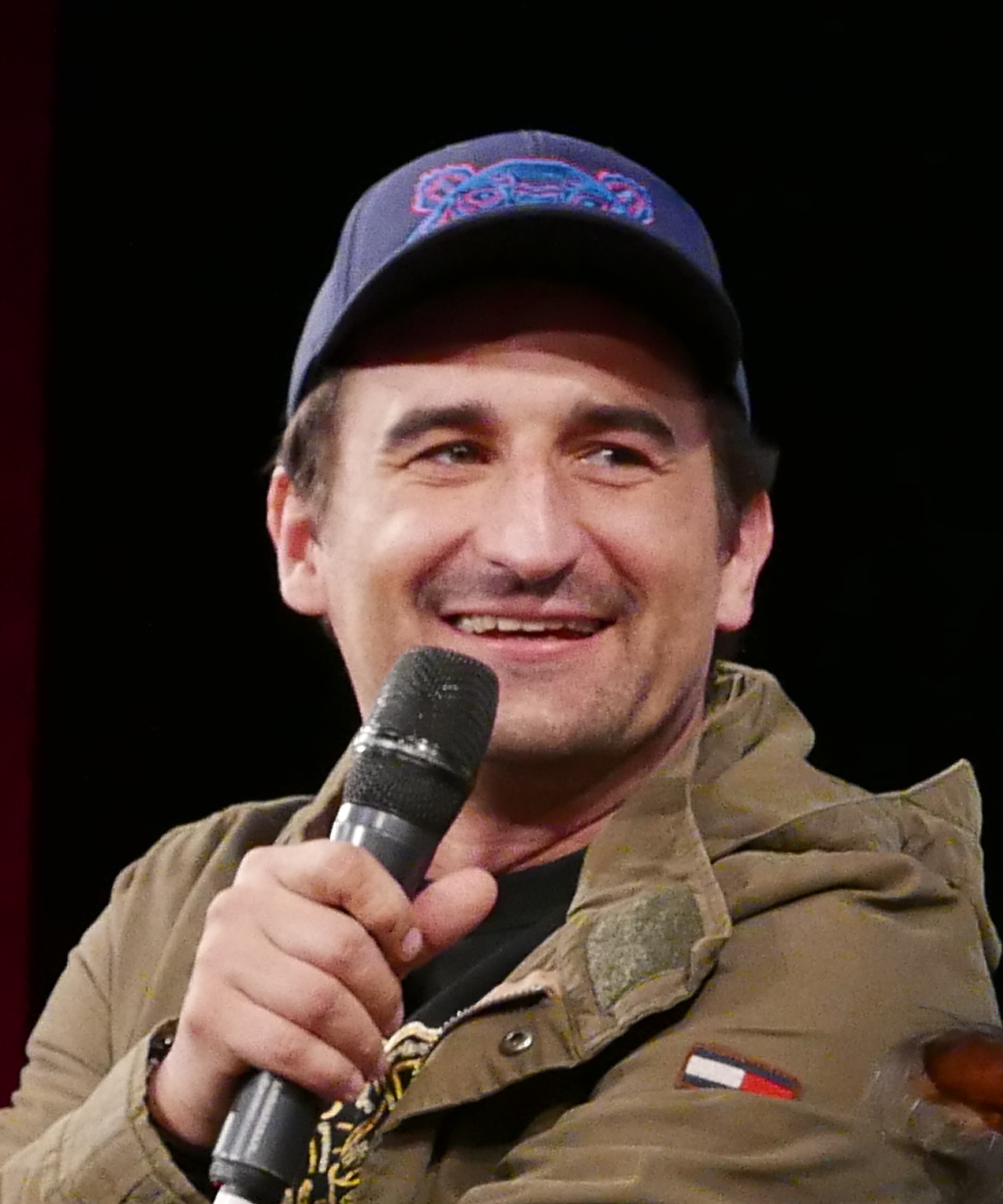
Michał Koterski portrayed Adaś in 7 uczuć

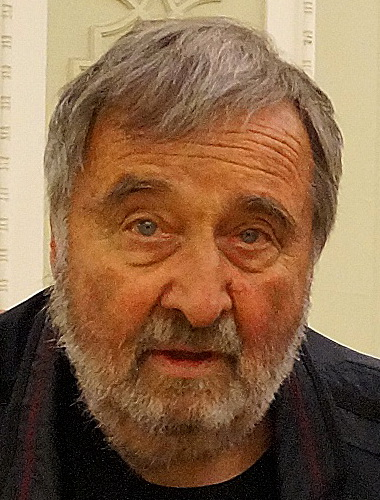
Krzysztof Kowalewski portrayed Adaś onstage in Życie wewnętrzne

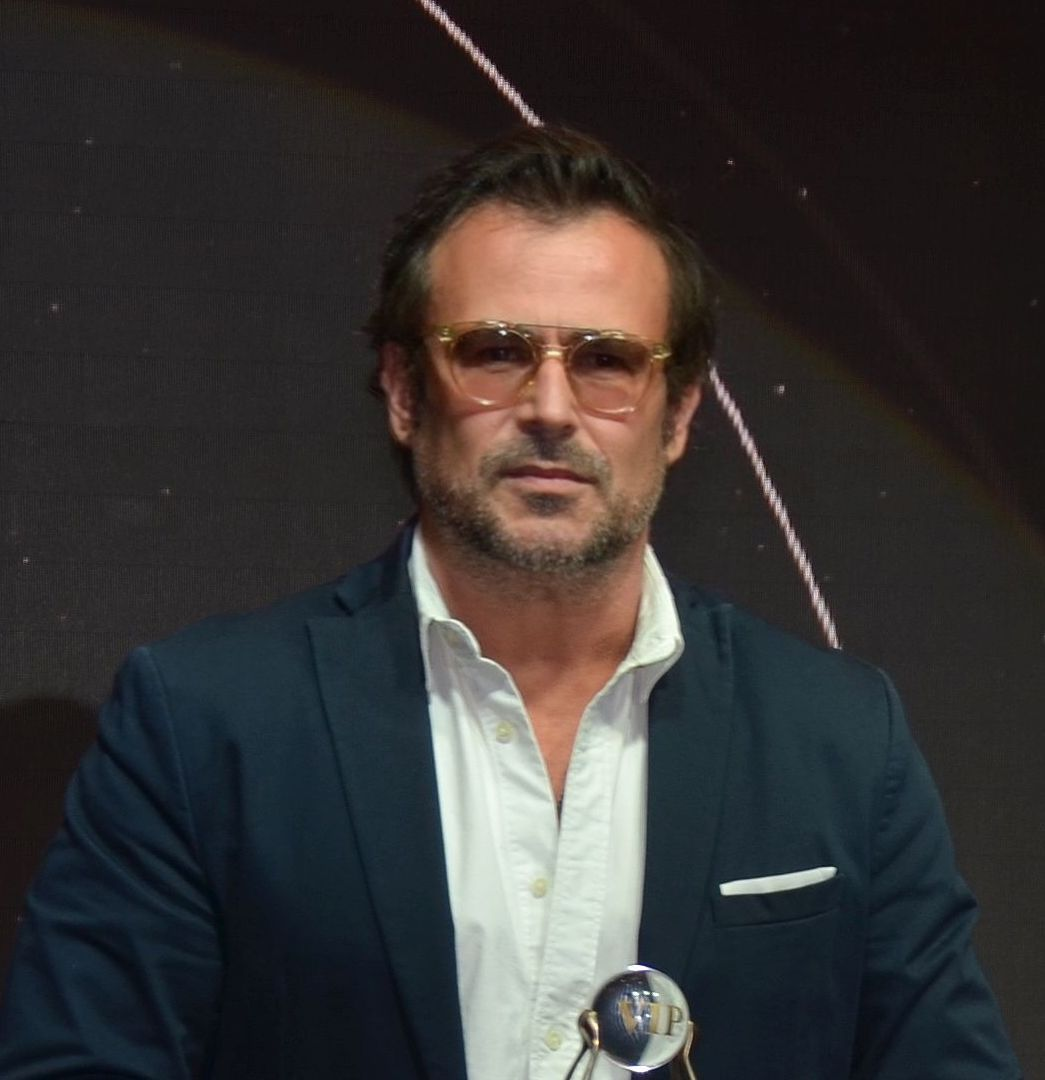
Bartosz Opania portrayed Adaś onstage in Dom wariatów
