= Jacek Borcuch =

Jacek Borcuch (born 17 April 1970 in Kwidzyn, Poland) is a Polish actor, film director and screenwriter.

== Early life and education ==
He studied philosophy at the University of Warsaw and acting at the Aleksander Zelwerowicz National Academy of Dramatic Art in Warsaw and the Vocal-Acting Studio at the Musical Theatre in Gdynia.

== Career ==
=== Acting ===
Borcuch began his professional career in 1990 as a theatre actor. He performed at the Musical Theatre in Gdynia, Rampa Theatre in Warsaw, the Opera and Operetta in Szczecin, and in Television Theatre productions before focusing on cinema.

His film debut came in 1995 with an episodic role in Marek Koterski's Nothing Funny. In 1999, he played one of the lead roles in Krzysztof Krauze's The Debt (Dług). His acting credits also include Krzysztof Zanussi's Supplement and Persona Non Grata, and Juliusz Machulski's How Much Does the Trojan Horse Weigh?.

He is also a member of the music group Physical Love.

=== Directing and screenwriting ===
In 1999, Borcuch made his directorial debut with Kallafiorr, in which he also starred and wrote the screenplay.

His most acclaimed work is All That I Love (Wszystko, co kocham, 2009), which was:

- Poland's submission for the Academy Award for Best International Feature Film at the 83rd Academy Awards
- Winner of the Golden Clapper and Golden Kangaroo at the 34th Gdynia Film Festival
- Winner of the Golden Duck Award for best Polish love story film
- Winner of Best Screenplay and Audience Award at the 13th Polish Eagle Awards
- The first Polish film selected for the main competition at the Sundance Film Festival

His subsequent films Lasting (Nieulotne) and Dolce Fine Giornata (Słodki koniec dnia) both had their world premieres at Sundance in the World Cinema Dramatic Competition, in 2013 and 2019 respectively.

In television, Borcuch directed the series Mrok and episodes of Samo życie, Magda M., Bez tajemnic, and Prawo Agaty.

== Personal life ==
He is the older brother of composer Daniel Bloom. From 2004 to 2012, he was married to actress Ilona Ostrowska. They have a daughter, Miłosława (born 2006).

== Filmography ==
=== As actor ===
Year	Title	Role	Notes
1991	Żołnierz królowej Madagaskaru	Traveller	
1995	Nothing Funny	Young Man	Surname in the credits: Boreuch
1995	Gracze	Policeman	Uncredited
1995	Sleeping Beauty	Prince Phillip	Voice dubbing
1996	Tajemnica Sagali	Postman Karol	Episodes 8, 10, 12
1996	Ekstradycja 2	Journalist	Episode 9; Uncredited
1997	Złotopolscy	Guy in pub	Episode 3
1997	Sposób na Alcybiadesa	Heniek	Episode 2
1998	Biały Kruk	Young Erwin	
1998	Ekstradycja 3	Journalist	Episodes 1, 5, 9
1999	Kallafiorr	Blum	Also director and screenwriter
1999	The Debt	Stefan Kowalczyk	
1999–2000	Na dobre i na złe	Daniel Stolarski	
2002	Suplement	Party Guest	Uncredited
2004	Czwarta władza	Marcin Wirski	
2005	Persona Non Grata	Roman	
2005	Kryminalni	Tomasz Pawlicki	Episode 18
2006	Loneliness on the Net	Jacek	
2008	Ile waży koń trojański?	Director	
2025	Wzgórze psów	Jacek	Episodes 3, 5

=== As director ===
Year	Title	Notes
1999	Kallafiorr	Also actor and screenwriter
2004	Tulipany	Also screenwriter
2004–2005	Samo życie	TV series
2005	Magda M.	TV series
2006	Mrok	TV series
2009	All That I Love	Also screenwriter; Sundance selection
2011–2012	Bez tajemnic	TV series
2012	Lasting (Nieulotne)	Also screenwriter; Sundance selection
2012–2015	Prawo Agaty	TV series
2018	Dolce Fine Giornata	Also screenwriter; Sundance selection
2020	Dzisiaj są moje urodziny	Also screenwriter
2022	Warszawianka	
2025	Wzgórze psów	TV series

=== As screenwriter ===
Year	Title
1999	Kallafiorr
2004	Tulipany
2009	All That I Love
2012	Lasting (Nieulotne)
2018	Dolce Fine Giornata
2020	Dzisiaj są moje urodziny
