= Gierek (film) =

- Official poster
- Directed by: Michał Węgrzyn
- Written by: Heatcliff Janusz Iwanowski Michał Kalicki; Krzysztof Tyszowiecki Rafał Woś
- Produced by: Jolanta Owczarczyk; Heatcliff Janusz Iwanowski
- Starring: Michał Koterski Małgorzata Kożuchowska; Jan Frycz; Agnieszka Więdłocha; Rafał Zawierucha Antoni Pawlicki
- Cinematography: Wojciech Węgrzyn
- Edited by: Bartosz Karczyński
- Music by: Maciej Zieliński
- Production company: Global Studio
- Distributed by: Dystrybucja Mówi Serwis
- Release date: 21 January 2022
- Running time: 141 minutes
- Country: Poland
- Language: Polish
- Box office: $1,531,831

Gierek (Polish: [ˈɡjɛ.rɛk]) is a 2022 Polish biographical film directed by Michał Węgrzyn. It is based on the life of Edward Gierek, the First Secretary of the Central Committee of the Polish United Workers' Party from 1970 to 1980, who in the movie is performed by Michał Koterski. The script was written by Heatcliff Janusz Iwanowski, Michał Kalicki, Krzysztof Tyszowiecki and Rafał Woś. It was produced by Global Studio and distributed by Dystrybucja Mówi Serwis. The production started on 27 July 2020. The film was set to premiere on 15 October 2021, but was eventually moved to 21 January 2022. It was filmed in Katowice, Ustroń, Dąbrowa Górnicza, and Zawiercie.

== Plot ==
The film tells the history of Edward Gierek, from taking over the position of First Secretary in 1970 until his internment in 1982. The plot mainly focuses on Gierek's attempts at reviving the Polish economy with foreign loans and the crisis that followed.

== Cast ==
- Michał Koterski – Edward Gierek, First Secretary of the Central Committee of the Polish United Workers' Party from 1970 to 1980
- Małgorzata Kożuchowska – Stanisława Gierek, wife of Gierek
- Rafał Zawierucha – Piotr Jaroszewicz, Prime Minister of Poland from 1970 to 1980
- Jan Frycz – Stefan Wyszyński, Primate of Poland from 1948 to 1981
- Agnieszka Więdłocha – Marzena, secretary of Gierek
- Cezary Żak – Leonid Brezhnev, leader of the Soviet Union from 1964 to 1982
- Nicole Bogdanowicz – secretary of Gierek
- Ewa Ziętek – Paulina, mother of Gierek
- Natalia Lesz – singer Stella
- Sebastian Stankiewicz – Maślak, based on Stanisław Kania
- Antoni Pawlicki – general Roztocki, based on general Wojciech Jaruzelski
- Dominika Gwit – secretary
- Maciej Zakościelny – scientist-general, based on Sylwester Kaliski
- Klaudia Halejcio – secretary Ryba
- Mikołaj Roznerski – shipyard worker
- Krzysztof Tyniec – KGB general, based on Yuri Anropov
- Piotr Witkowski – banker
- Philippe Tłokiński – Pierre Lavale, banker
- Damian Bajorek – Wasiak, assistant of Gierek
- Kamil Bajorek – SB officer Jeziorak
- Jakub Józefowicz - ZSMP member Aleksander
- Konrad Marszałek – Czesiek, adjutant
- Lech Soluba – Wladyslaw Gomulka
