= 20th Moscow International Film Festival =

1997 film festival in Moscow, Russia

- Location: Moscow, Russia
- Founded: 1959
- Awards: Grand Prix
- Festival date: 19–29 July 1997
- Website: Website

The 20th Moscow International Film Festival was held from 19 to 29 July 1997. The Golden St. George was awarded to the American film Marvin's Room directed by Jerry Zaks.

== Jury ==
- Oleg Menshikov (Russia – President of the Jury)
- Georgi Djulgerov (Bulgaria)
- Irakli Kvirikadze (Georgia)
- Fernando Mendez-Leite (Spain)
- Michel Seydoux (France)
- Sergio Olhovich (Mexico)
- Mrinal Sen (India)
- Beata Tyszkiewicz (Poland)

== Films in competition ==
The following films were selected for the main competition:

English title	Original title	Director(s)	Production country
Swallowtail	Suvaroteiru	Shunji Iwai	Japan
Blue Mountain	Blue Mountain	Thomas Tanner	Switzerland, Germany
The Minister of State	Ságojoga ministtar	Paul-Anders Simma	Finland, Norway, Sweden
Knockin' on Heaven's Door	Knockin' on Heaven's Door	Thomas Jahn	Germany, Netherlands, Belgium
Kings for a Day	Comme des rois	François Velle	France
Marvin's Room	Marvin's Room	Jerry Zaks	United States
A Trap	Pułapka	Adek Drabiński	Poland
The Witman Boys	Witman fiuk	János Szász	Hungary, France, Germany, Poland
Marianna Ucrìa	Marianna Ucrìa	Roberto Faenza	Italy, France, Portugal
Mother and Son	Mat' i syn	Alexander Sokurov	Russia, Germany
The Best Job in the World	Le Plus Beau Métier du monde	Gérard Lauzier	France
Shanghai 1937	Hotel Shanghai	Peter Patzak	Austria, China
First Option	Fei hu	Gordon Chan	Hong Kong
Bring Me the Head of Mavis Davis	Bring Me the Head of Mavis Davis	John Henderson	United Kingdom
Sardari Begum	Sardari Begum	Shyam Benegal	India
Chevrolet	Chevrolet	Javier Maqua	Spain

== Awards ==
- Golden St. George: Marvin's Room by Jerry Zaks
- Special Silver St. George: Mother and Son by Alexander Sokurov
- Silver St. George:
  - Best Director: János Szász for The Witman Boys
  - Best Actor: Til Schweiger for Knockin' on Heaven's Door
  - Best Actress: Isabel Ordaz for Chevrolet
- Prix FIPRESCI: The Witman Boys by János Szász
- Honorable Prize – For the contribution to the cinema:
  - Robert De Niro, actor (United States)
  - Andrei Mikhalkov-Konchalovsky, director (Russia)
  - Sophia Loren, actress (Italy)
  - Catherine Deneuve, actress (France)
