= Janusz Rewiński =

Polish actor and politician (1949–2024)

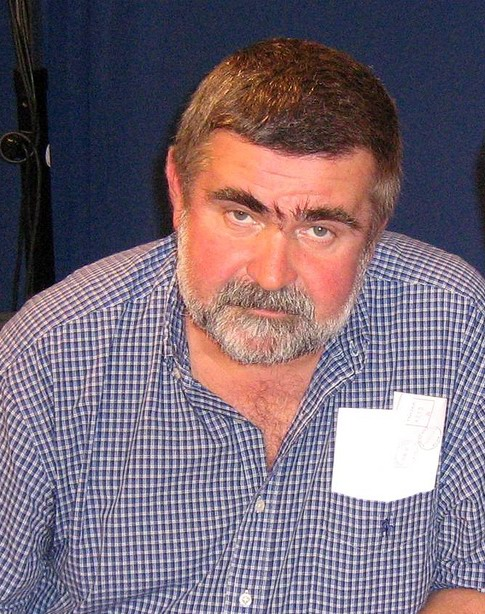
- Rewiński in 2007

Member of the Sejm
- In office 25 November 1991 – 31 May 1993

Personal details
- Born: 16 September 1949 Żary, Poland
- Died: 1 June 2024 (aged 74) Warsaw, Poland
- Party: PPPP
- Education: State College of Acting
- Occupation: Actor

Janusz Rewiński (16 September 1949 – 1 June 2024) was a Polish actor and politician. A member of the Polish Beer-Lovers' Party, he served in the Sejm from 1991 to 1993. He played a role in 1997 movie Kiler and its 1999 sequel.

Rewiński died on 1 June 2024, at the age of 74.

== Sources ==
- Rewiński, Janusz; Lejda, Stanisław (1993). Z kabaretu do Sejmu... i z powrotem? (in Polish). Opole: Opolpress. ISBN 8385750029. LCCN 94111057. OCLC 233383897.
- Biały, Beata (2026). Siara : i nic nie jest jasne (in Polish). Kraków: Wydawnictwo Otwarte. ISBN 9788383990163.
