= Patrycja Soliman =

Polish actress (born 1981)

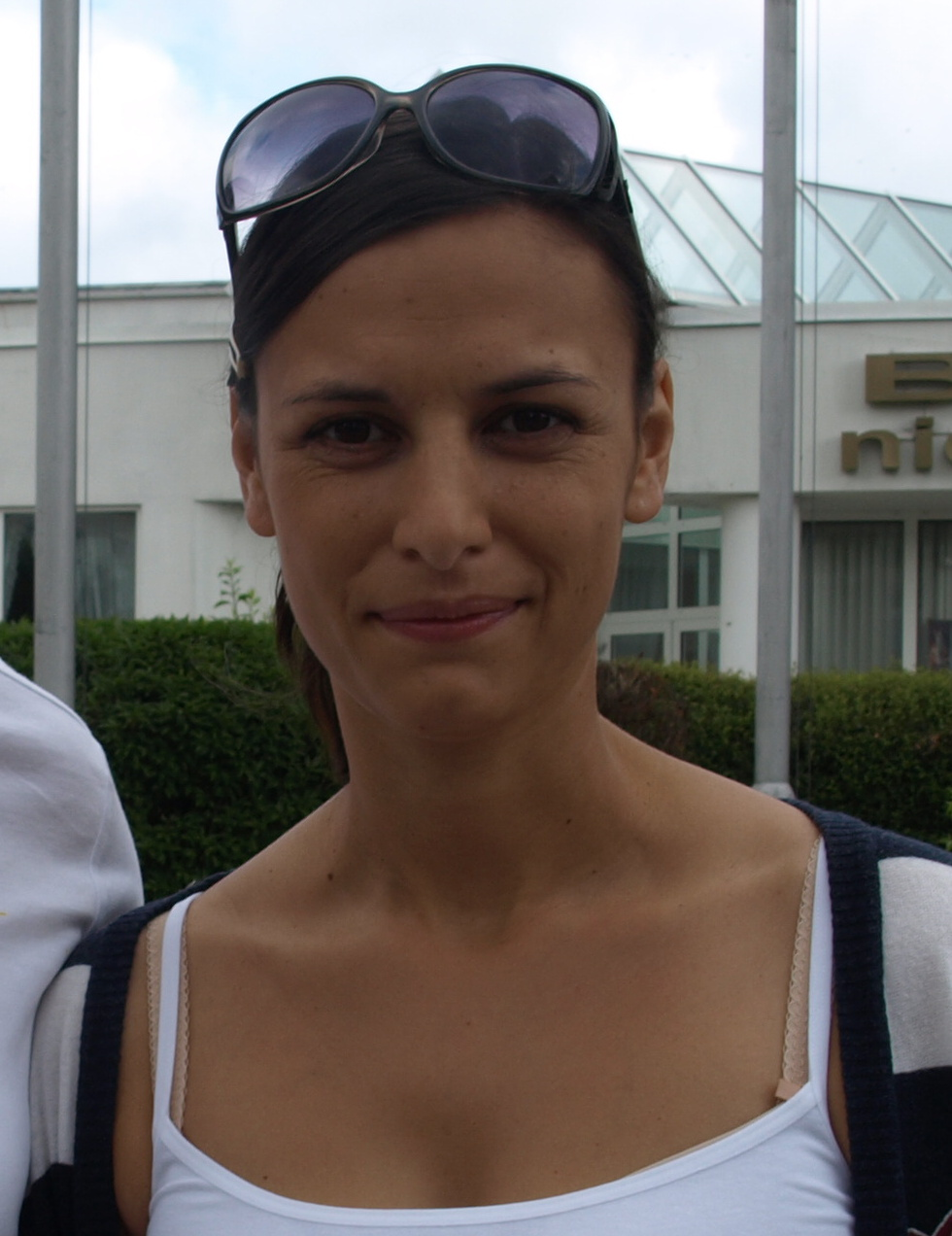
- Born: 3 December 1981 (age 44); Cairo, Egypt
- Occupation: Actress
- Years active: 2002–present

Patrycja Soliman (born 3 December 1981) is a Polish film and stage actress.

== Biography ==
She was born to an Egyptian father and a Polish mother.

In 2006 she graduated from the Aleksander Zelwerowicz State Theatre Academy in Warsaw. Patrycja Soliman debuted as an actress in 2002 in the movie Day of the wacko.

== Filmography ==
Movies

- 2009: Play With Me as Hania
- 2007: Louise's Garden as Luisa
- 2007: The Boat as Agata
- 2006: We're All Christs as journalist
- 2006: Jasminum as Jasminum
- 2005: Karol: A Man Who Became Pope as Wisława
- 2002: Day of the wacko as girl

TV series

- 2009: Barwy Szczęścia
- 2008: Londoners
- 2007: Królowie Śródmieścia
- 2007: Ekipa
- 2007: Kryminalni
- 2006: M jak miłość
- 2006: Królowie Śródmieścia
- 2005: Boża podszewka II
- 2004-2006: Pensjonat pod Różą
- 2004: Na dobre i na złe
- 2003: Glina

== Awards ==
- Best Supporting Actress at XXIV Festival of the Drama & Theatre Schools in Łódź, for Trzy siostry and Bezimienne dzieło (2006)
- Andrzej Naderlli Award for the best actors debut in the National Theatre in Warsaw (2007)
