= Katarzyna Figura =

Polish actress

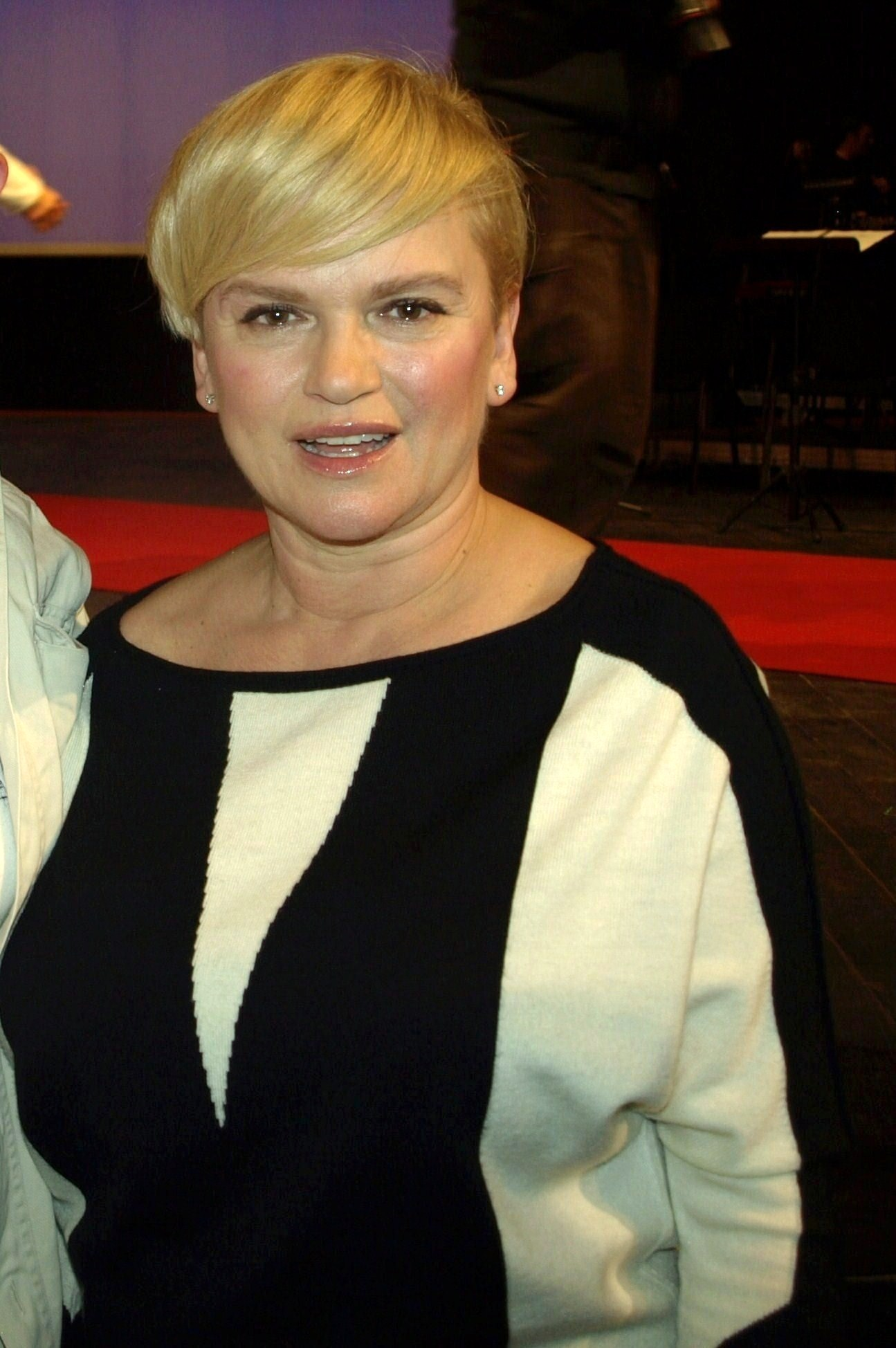
- Katarzyna Figura, 2014
- Born: 22 March 1962 (age 64); Warsaw, Poland
- Other name: Kasia Figura
- Occupation: Actress
- Years active: 1976–present
- Spouse(s): Jan Chmielewski (1986-1989); Kai Schoenhals (2000-2012)
- Children: 3

Katarzyna Małgorzata Figura (Polish pronunciation: [kataˈʐɨna fiˈɡura]; born 22 March 1962) is a Polish film, theatre and television actress. She is sometimes billed as "Kasia Figura", as in Prêt-à-Porter, Robert Altman's 1994 film.

== Career ==
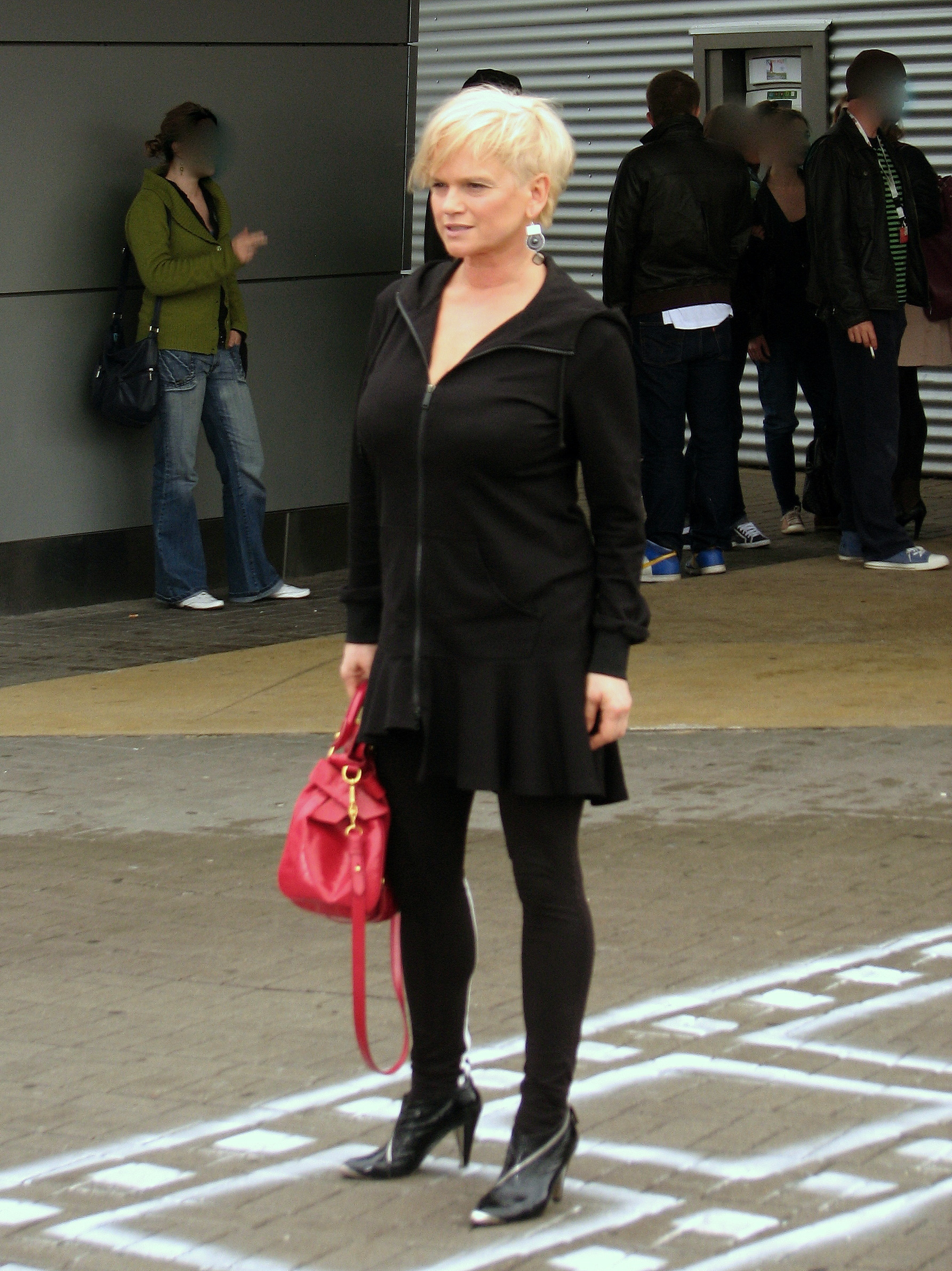
Katarzyna Figura during the XXXV Polish Film Festival in Gdynia, 2010.

Figura was born in Warsaw, Poland. She graduated from the National Academy of Dramatic Art in Warsaw and continued her studies at the Parisian Conservatoire d'Art Dramatique. She is one of the most recognized and popular actresses in the contemporary Polish film industry. She often played blond bombshells, prostitutes, and wives of rich men. Recently, she has changed her image radically in favor of more mature characters, who are very often sorrowful and embittered.

Katarzyna Figura still appears in TV shows. For many years, she has been featured in single episodes of popular sitcoms, and has regularly appeared in the show Witches (since 2005). In 2004, she made her come-back to theater after a long-term absence. Her role in Alina to the West by Paweł Miśkiewicz in the Warsaw Drama Theater was highly regarded by the critics. She shaved her head for that role, consequently breaking from her sex symbol image. She played at Teatr Współczesny between 1985 and 1988. Branded a Polish Marilyn Monroe after her role in Radosław Piwowarski's film Pociąg do Hollywood (1987), her first big part. She lost out for roles in The Player (1992), Dracula (1992) and Goldeneye (1995).

She was awarded two Golden Lions Awards for Best Actress (1999 and 2003) at the Gdynia Film Festival as well as the Eagle Award (2004). In 2019, she received the Zbigniew Cybulski Award for Lifetime Achievement.

== Personal life ==
She has one son, Aleksander (b. 1987), with her former husband Jan Chmielewski. Her first daughter, Koko Claire Figura-Schoenhals, was born 24 October 2002 in New York, USA. Her second daughter, Kaszmir Amber, was born 27 February 2005 in Warsaw, Poland.

== Selected filmography ==
- Zginął pies (1976, Short)
- Mysz (1980, TV Movie)
- Bez końca (1985) - Asystentka hipnotyzera (uncredited)
- Przeznaczenie (1985) - Laura
- Rośliny trujące (1985, TV Movie) - Goga 'Saganka'
- Osobisty pamiętnik grzesznika przez niego samego spisany (1986) - Cyntia
- Ga. Ga. Chwała bohaterom (1986) - Once
- Zkrocení zlého muže (1986)
- Pierścień i róża (1987) - Rózia
- Komediantka (1987) - Mimi Zarzycka
- Pociąg do Hollywood (1987) - Marilyn
- Season of Monsters (1987) - Annabella
- Kingsajz (1988) - Ala
- W klatce (1988) - Marta
- Nebojsa (1989) - Cerná paní
- Estación Central (1989) - Elena
- Rififi po sześćdziesiątce (1989, TV Movie) - Eliza
- Porno (1990) - Superblondyna
- Swinka (1990) - Dolores Mendoza
- Mleczna droga (1991, TV Movie) - The Death
- Panny i wdowy (1991) - Karolina Lechicka
- Obywatel świata (1991)
- L'ambassade en folie (1992) - Sasha Moliniva
- The Player (1992) - Kasia Figura
- Screen Two (1992, TV Series) - Leni
- Wesoła noc smutnego biznesmena (1993, TV Movie)
- Vortice Mortale (1993) - Vida Kolba
- Fatal Past (1994) - Jennifer Lawrence
- Ready to Wear (1994) - Sissy's Assistant
- Wrzeciono czasu (1995) - Matylda
- Too Fast Too Young (1996) - Kaddy Havel
- Germans (1996) - Maritza
- Autoportret z kochanka (1996) - Diana
- Bieg do drzewa (1996)
- Słoneczny zegar (1997)
- Historie miłosne (1997) - Kryska, zona Filipa
- Szcześliwego Nowego Jorku (1997) - Teriza
- Kiler (1997) - Rysia
- Prostytutki (1998) - Grazia
- Złoto dezerterów (1998) - Basia
- Kiler-ów 2-óch (1999) - Rysia, Siara's Wife
- Ajlawju (1999) - Gosia
- Zakochani (2000) - Edyta Bobicka
- Stacja (2001) - Wolanski's wife
- Career of Nikos Dyzma (2002) - Nurse
- The Pianist (2002) - Neighbour
- Zemsta (2002) - Podstolina Hanna
- Żurek (2003) - Halina
- Ubu Król (2003) - Ubica
- We're All Christs (2006) - Registry Office Clerk
- Summer Love (2006) - The Woman
- Aria Diva (2007, Short) - Diva Joanna
- To nie tak, jak myślisz, kotku (2008) - Maria
- Kochaj i tańcz (2008) - Basia - Hania's mother
- The Magic Stone (2009)
- Cudowne lato (2010) - Matka - Aurelia
- Och, Karol (2011) - Judge
- Wyjazd integracyjny (2011) - Mrs. Jadzia
- Yuma (2012) - Halinka
- Komisarz Blond i Oko Sprawiedliwosci (2012) - Lolek Orchiestra
- Bejbi blues (2012) - Neighbour
- Podejrzani zakochani (2013) - 'Fourty'
- Panie Dulskie (2015) - Melania 'Mela'
- Słaba płeć? (2015) - Mother
- Papierowe gody (2017) - Agata's mother
- Ah śpij kochanie (2017) - Ruda
- 7 uczuć (2018) - Gosia
- Diablo (2019) - Feliksa
- Nerd (2019) - Norbert's Mom
- Never Gonna Snow Again (2020) - Owner of bulldogs
- Raz, jeszcze raz (2020) - Mother
- Dziewczyny z Dubaju (2021) - Dorota

== See also ==
- Polish cinema
- List of Poles
