= Shanghai 1937 =

1997 film

- Based on: Hotel Shanghai by Vicki Baum
- Written by: Angel Wagenstein
- Directed by: Peter Patzak
- Starring: Agnieszka Wagner
- Countries of origin: Germany; China
- Original languages: German; English

Production
- Producer: Manfred Durniok
- Running time: 180 minutes

Original release
- Release: 30 March – 31 March 1997

Shanghai 1937 (also released as Hotel Shanghai) is a 1997 German two-part miniseries directed by Peter Patzak for German Television. It was entered into the 20th Moscow International Film Festival.

== Cast ==
- Agnieszka Wagner as Helen Russell
- Nicholas Clay as Bobby
- James McCaffrey as Frank Taylor
- Zhang Min
- Dieter Laser
- Robert Giggenbach
- Nigel Davenport as Butler
- Elliott Gould as Hutchinson
- Annie Girardot as Mme. Tissaud
- Patrick Ryecart as Sir Kingsdale-Smith

== Reception ==
In a positive review for The Hollywood Reporter, Duane Byrge wrote, "Director Peter Patzak has fashioned a roiling entertainment, nicely transposing this sprawling story to a tight, filmic dimension. Technically, it's marvelous with its teeming visuals and captivating marches through old Shanghai. Highest praise to cinematographer Martin Stingl for the panoramic scopings, and particular praise to art director Qin Baisong for evoking the passions and terrors of the times."

In a negative review for Variety, Angela Baldassarre wrote, "Considering the large number of subplots, there is little room in Hotel Shanghai for character development; none of the personalities gets beyond mere introduction. The performances, thus, come across as incomplete and mediocre."
