= Colonel Kwiatkowski =

1996 Polish film

- Polish: Pułkownik Kwiatkowski
- Directed by: Kazimierz Kutz
- Written by: Jerzy Stefan Stawiński
- Starring: Marek Kondrat, Zbigniew Zamachowski, Renata Dancewicz
- Cinematography: Grzegorz Kędzierski
- Music by: Jan Kanty Pawluśkiewicz
- Release date: 1996
- Running time: 123 minutes
- Country: Poland
- Language: Polish

Colonel Kwiatkowski (Polish: Pułkownik Kwiatkowski) is a Polish comedy-drama film directed by Kazimierz Kutz. It was released in 1996. The movie is loosely based on post-WW2 life of Tadeusz Ośko, a Polish anti-Soviet resistance member who assumed a false identity of "Wojciech Kossowski" to infiltrate the Polish People's Army.

== Plot ==
Just after the end of World War II, Kwiatkowski, a military physician, finds himself in a quarrel with a Soviet officer. To avoid escalation, he pretends that he is a high-ranking UB official. After getting away with it, he is asked by a mother of an AK fighter to help her son from becoming a political prisoner. Kwiatkowski frees the young man by pretending to make an inspection of the facility he is jailed in. The fake officer decides to use the post-war confusion and lawlessness to liberate several other political prisoners.
