= Bieżuń =

Town in Masovian Voivodeship, Poland

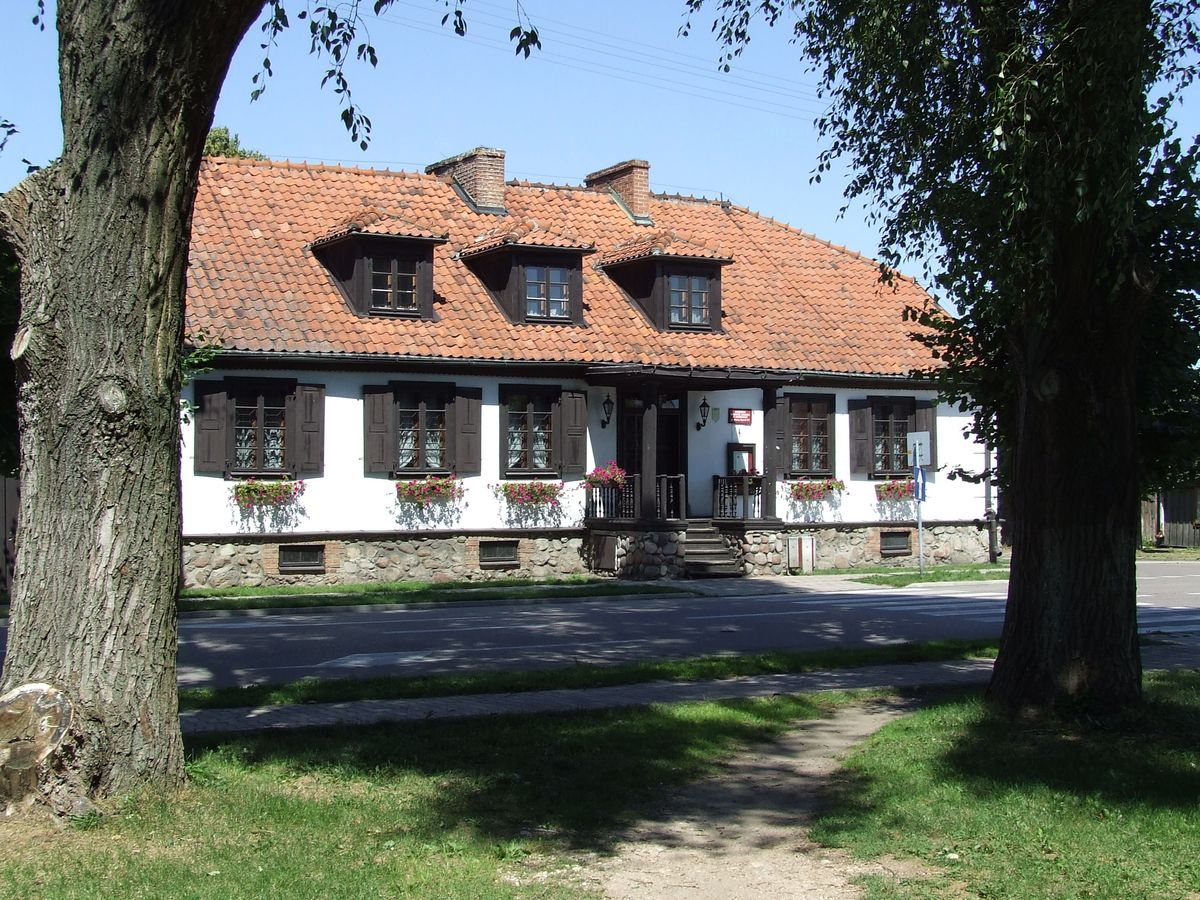
- Museum

- Flag Coat of arms

- Location within Poland
- Coordinates: 52°57′N 19°53′E
- Country: Poland
- Voivodeship: Masovian
- County: Żuromin
- Gmina: Bieżuń
- Town rights: 1406-1869, 1994

Government
  - Mayor: Andrzej Szymański

Area
  - Total: 12.07 km^{2} (4.66 sq mi)

Population (31 December 2021)
  - Total: 1,807
  - Density: 150/km^{2} (390/sq mi)
- Time zone: UTC+1 (CET)
  - Summer (DST): UTC+2 (CEST)
- Postal code: 09-320
- Area code: +48 23
- Car plates: WZU
- Website: http://www.biezun.pl

Bieżuń [ˈbʲɛʐuɲ] is a town in Żuromin County, Masovian Voivodeship, in north-central Poland. The town lies on the Wkra River. As of December 2021, it has a population of 1,807.

== History ==
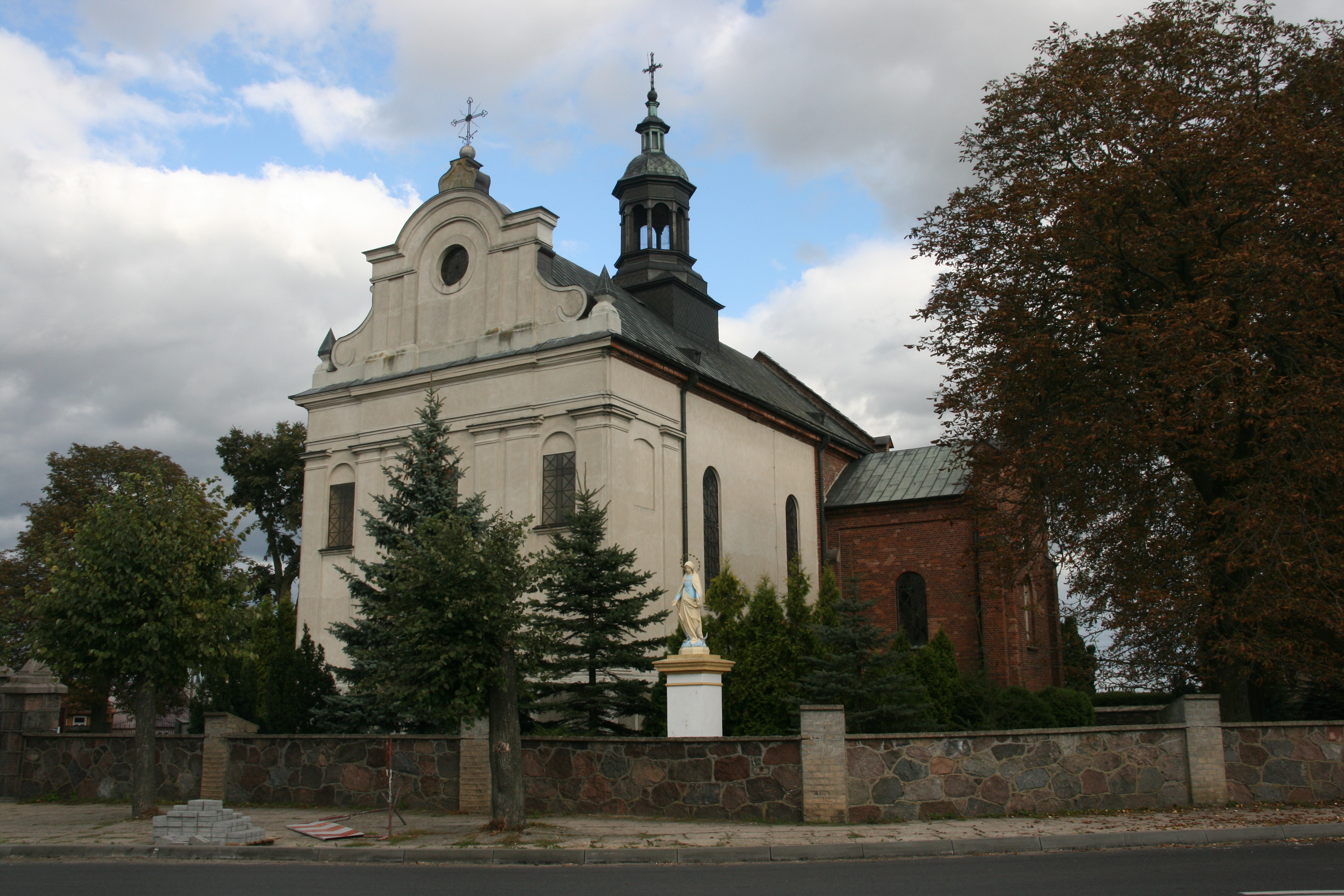
Baroque Holy Trinity church

Jędrzej of Golczew, castellan of Płock, established the town at the end of the 14th century. Bieżuń was located on a trade route connecting Toruń with Brześć. Duke Siemowit IV of Masovia granted the town rights charter in 1406 and in 1869, during Russia's occupation, Bieżuń lost its town rights until 1994. Bieżuń was a private town, administratively located in the Sierpc County in the Płock Voivodeship in the Greater Poland Province of the Kingdom of Poland. Prior to the Deluge the town was famous and had a strong castle, but it was destroyed during that war. Polish Crown Chancellor Andrzej Zamoyski was born there and lived in the palace he built while working on his code of civil laws known as Zbiór praw sądowych. During Zamojski's residency there, in 1767, Polish–Lithuanian Commonwealth king Stanisław August Poniatowski granted the renewal of the town charter under the Magdeburg rights.

After the Third Partition of Poland the town fell to Prussia, then during the War of the Fourth Coalition there was a small pitched battle between the Napoleonic troops and the Prussians, known as the Battle of Bieżuń, a French victory that took place on December 21–23, 1806. Between 1807 and 1815 it was part of the Polish Duchy of Warsaw, then under the Russian dominion until 1918, when Poland regained independence. During the Polish–Soviet War, the Soviets invaded the town on 22 August 1920, and then briefly occupied it.

Following the joint German-Soviet invasion of Poland, which started World War II in September 1939, the town was occupied by Germany until 1945. In 1942, the occupiers expelled around 100 Poles from the town. Expelled Poles were initially held in a camp in Działdowo and then deported to the Kraków District of the General Government in German-occupied southern Poland, while their houses were handed over to German colonists as part of the Lebensraum policy.

== Sports ==
The local football team is Wkra Bieżuń. It competes in the lower leagues.

== Notable people ==
- Jerzy Bończak (born 1949), Polish actor
