= Nothing Funny =

1995 Polish drama film

- Polish: Nic śmiesznego
- Written by: Marek Koterski
- Starring: Cezary Pazura; Ewa Błaszczyk; Maciej Kozłowski; Agnieszka Wagner
- Cinematography: Bogdan Stachurski
- Edited by: Wanda Zeman
- Music by: Bernard Kawka
- Release date: 7 November 1995 (GFF)
- Running time: 91 minutes
- Country: Poland
- Language: Polish

Nothing Funny (Polish: Nic śmiesznego) is a 1995 Polish tragicomedy film directed by Marek Koterski. It is the fourth in a nine-part series of films about the character Adaś Miauczyński, created by Koterski. Each story showcases a different aspect or era of his life, often with little continuity between them.

== Synopsis ==
In this period of his life, Adaś Miauczyński is a bumbling film director. A graduate of the Łódź Film School, Miauczyński feels professionally and personally unfulfilled. His career path has been marked by failure, and his first film is a flop. His continued search for the woman of his life proves futile, something he is reminded of each time his colleague Maciej sleeps with a woman Miauczyński goes on a date with. When his ex-wife, Beata, with whom he still lives but who despises him, together with their daughter, orchestrates a mock kidnapping and execution, Miauczyński suffers a fatal heart attack. The story is presented from the perspective of his corpse lying on a table at the morgue, "reminiscing" about his life.

== Cast ==
- Cezary Pazura as Adaś Miauczyński
- Maciej Kozłowski as Maciej
- Marek Kondrat as the film director
- Ewa Błaszczyk as Beata Miauczynska
- Agnieszka Wagner as Adam's mother
- Henryk Bista as the pyrotechnician
- Jerzy Bończak as the technician
- Krzysztof Kowalewski as the producer
