= Louise's Garden =

- Directed by: Maciej Wojtyszko
- Starring: Patrycja Soliman; Marcin Dorociński
- Release date: 19 September 2007 (GFF)
- Running time: 1h 45min
- Country: Poland
- Language: Polish

Louise's Garden (Polish: Ogród Luizy, lit. 'Luiza's garden') is a 2007 Polish comedy film directed by Maciej Wojtyszko. The film received various nominations at the 2009 Polish Film Festival and the Polish Academy Awards, including that for Best Editing.

== Cast ==
- Patrycja Soliman - Luiza Bartodziej
- Marcin Dorociński - Fabian Sawicki 'Fabio'
- Kinga Preis - Anna Swiatek
- Krzysztof Stroiński - Lech Bartodziej
- Marcin Hycnar - Orderly Marian
- Władysław Kowalski - Lawyer Frankowski 'Kaleka'
- Leslaw Zurek - Di Caprio
- Anna Lopatowska - Luiza's Mother
- Wiktoria Gorodecka - Prostitute Tatiana
- Tomasz Augustynowicz - Zygmunt Grudzien
- Witold Wieliński - Lawyer Jacek Grzelakowski
