= Isabel Ordaz =

Spanish actress

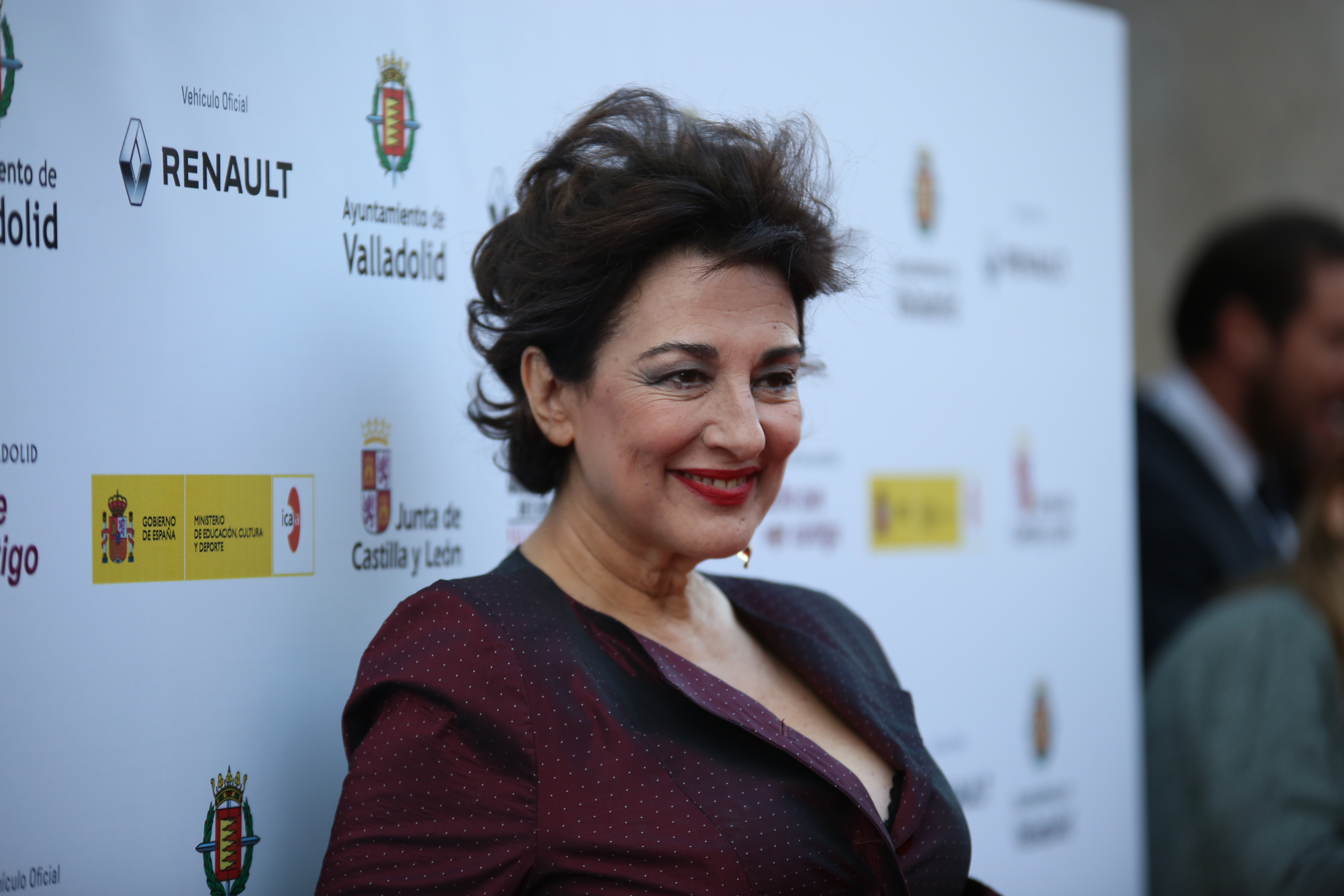
- Born: Isabel Ordaz Luengo; 11 March 1957 (age 69); Madrid, Spain
- Occupation: Actress
- Years active: 1982-present

Isabel Ordaz Luengo (born 11 March 1957) is a Spanish actress. She has appeared in more than fifty films and television shows since 1982. She won the Silver St. George for Best Actress for her role in Chevrolet at the 20th Moscow International Film Festival. She appeared in television series such as Aquí no hay quien viva and La que se avecina.

== Biography ==
From a young age, she was drawn to theater and acting and took several courses with actor José Luis Gómez and John Strasberg. In 1982, she made her first short film, Eres mi gula, followed by others such as Salida de misa de doce del Pilar, also in 1982, and El vividor II in 1983.

During the 1980s, she combined theater with short films and small appearances in movies, such as in Fernando Trueba 1986 film Year of Enlightment. In 1987, she began a memorable role as Berta in the children's series Los mundos de Yupi. From this role onwards, Ordaz gained greater prominence and had a small role in Fernando Colomo 1989 film Going South Shopping and also joined the cast of the program A ver, a ver by Martes y Trece.

She continues to work in theater and star in short films, including Esa es tu parte with Gabino Diego, for which she wins several acting awards. She appears in films such as Why Do They Call It Love When They Mean Sex? and All Men Are the Same. She gains widespread recognition for her leading role in Pepa y Pepe, a series in which she plays Verónica Forqué friend.

In 1997, she starred in the television adaptation of the film All Men Are the Same. That same year, her film career took a major turn when she won the Goya Award for Best New Actress for her role as Lucía in Chevrolet. Her position in cinema changed completely, and she went on to play important supporting roles in Yoyes and Carne de gallina.

Directed by Rafael Gordon, she stars in the 2000 film La reina Isabel en persona, in which she plays an actress who, while playing the role of Isabella I of Castile, becomes so immersed in her character that she lives as her.

In 2002, she starred alongside Assumpta Serna in Teresa Teresa, in which she played the mystic Teresa of Ávila. She continued to play important supporting roles in films such as El Calentito, until she began appearing in the highly successful series Aquí no hay quien viva on Antena 3, in which she played the mystic Isabel, nicknamed La Hierbas (The Herbs) because of her fondness for natural remedies.

In 2007, she joined the cast of the sequel series to Aquí no hay quien viva: La que se avecina on Telecinco, playing the role of Araceli Madariaga, leaving the series on several occasions due to her theater work. In 2016, she left the series for good at the end of the ninth season.

She also has an impressive theater career behind her, having starred in plays such as Algún amor que no mate, La dama boba, Electra, El caso de la mujer asesinadita, Cuando era pequeña, Los días felices, La asamblea de mujeres (premiered at the Mérida Festival), Luces de bohemia, and Lúcido. She has also staged her own productions, such as Aliento de equilibrista (written together with Paloma Pedrero), Nonadas, Partitura teatral, and Happy Days.

Ordaz is also the author of several poetry collections, such as Flor de alientos (Breath Flower), No sé (I Don't Know), Poemas de Palestina (Poems of Palestine), El agua de la lluvia tiene algo (Rainwater Has Something) and La geografía de tu nombre (The Geography of Your Name), as well as the short story collection Despedidas (Farewells), published by Huerga y Fierro. She has also written a book about her experience as a cancer survivor, La vida en otra parte (Life Elsewhere) (2024).

== Selected filmography ==
- Chevrolet (1997)
- Todo mujer (2017)
