= We're All Christs =

2006 Polish comedy-drama film

- Polish film poster
- Polish: Wszyscy jesteśmy Chrystusami
- Directed by: Marek Koterski
- Written by: Marek Koterski
- Screenplay by: Marek Koterski
- Produced by: Wlodzimierz Otulak
- Starring: Marek Kondrat; Andrzej Chyra; Michał Koterski; Janina Traczykówna; Małgorzata Bogdańska; Tomasz Sapryk; Marcin Dorociński
- Cinematography: Edward Kłosiński
- Edited by: Ewa Smal
- Music by: Jerzy Satanowski
- Production company: Vision Film Production
- Distributed by: Vision
- Release date: 21 April 2006 (Poland)
- Running time: 107 minutes
- Country: Poland
- Language: Polish

We're All Christs (Wszyscy jesteśmy Chrystusami) is a 2006 Polish comedy-drama film directed by Marek Koterski. It is the seventh in a nine-part series of films about the character Adaś Miauczyński, created by Koterski. Each story showcases a different aspect or era of his life, often with little continuity between them.

We're All Christs focuses on the protagonist's alcohol addiction and his relationship with his son, Sylwuś, with emphasis on the way the father's alcoholism has caused lifelong trauma for the pair. Miauczyński is portrayed by two actors in the film, Marek Kondrat and Andrzej Chyra, each of whom embodies him at a different stage of his life.

== Cast ==
- Marek Kondrat as Adaś Miauczyński at 55
- Andrzej Chyra as Adaś Miauczyński at 33
- Michał Koterski as Sylwek
- Janina Traczykówna as Adaś's mother
- Małgorzata Bogdańska as Adaś's wife
- Tomasz Sapryk as guardian angel
- Marcin Dorociński as evil angel
- Andrzej Grabowski as Adaś's friend
- Marian Dziędziel as Adaś's friend
- Jan Frycz as Adaś's friend
- Artur Żmijewski as Adaś's friend
- Paweł Królikowski as Adaś's friend
- Andrzej Zieliński as Adaś's friend
- Ewa Ziętek as Sylwek's teacher
- Patrycja Soliman as journalist
