= Chevrolet (film) =

1997 film

- Directed by: Javier Maqua
- Screenplay by: Javier Maqua; Montxo Armendáriz; Gaizka Urresti; Luis Ángel Ramírez
- Story by: Javier Maqua
- Starring: Javier Albalá; Manuel de Blas; Isabel Ordaz; Mario Zorrilla; Alfonso Asenjo; Juan Margallo; Alfonso Vallejo; Mariola Fuentes; Quino Pueyo
- Cinematography: Juan Carlos Gómez
- Edited by: Luis Villar
- Music by: Ángel Enfedaque
- Production company: Imval
- Distributed by: Civite
- Release dates: July 1997 (Moscow); 29 August 1997 (Spain)
- Running time: 96 minutes
- Country: Spain
- Language: Spanish

Chevrolet is a 1997 Spanish crime film directed by Javier Maqua. It stars Javier Albalá, Manuel de Blas, and Isabel Ordaz.

== Cast ==
- Javier Albalá as Brujas
- Manuel de Blas as Gaspar
- Isabel Ordaz as Lucía
- Mario Zorrilla as Juanvi
- Mariola Fuentes as Rosa
- Alfonso Asenjo as Turco
- Alfonso Vallejo as Cuevas
- Juan Margallo as Padre Miguel
- Emilio Batista as Pinto

== Release ==
It was entered into the 20th Moscow International Film Festival where Isabel Ordaz won the Silver St. George for Best Actress. Distributed by Civite, it was released theatrically in Spain on 29 August 1997.

== Reception ==
Jonathan Holland of Variety deemed the film to be "an accomplished, grittily authentic and nonmoralistic study of false hopes and broken dreams on the Spanish urban underbelly".

== Accolades ==
| Year | Award | Category | Nominee(s) | Result | Ref. |
|---|---|---|---|---|---|
| 1998 | 12th Goya Awards | Best New Actress | Isabel Ordaz | Won | |

== See also ==
- List of Spanish films of 1997
