= Hotel Pacific =

1975 Polish film

- Directed by: Janusz Majewski
- Written by: Pavel Hajný; Henryk Worcell
- Starring: Marek Kondrat
- Cinematography: Miroslav Ondříček
- Edited by: Elżbieta Kurkowska
- Music by: Jerzy Matuszkiewicz
- Release date: 27 November 1975
- Running time: 94 minutes
- Countries: Poland; Czechoslovakia
- Language: Polish

Hotel Pacific (Polish: Zaklęte rewiry) is a 1975 Polish drama film directed by Janusz Majewski. It was entered into the 26th Berlin International Film Festival.

== Plot ==
A jobless youth from upcountry, Roman (Kondrat), whose belongings are crammed into a single suitcase is wandering through a midden-littered alleyway when he chances upon a well-dressed, mustachioed middle-aged man kicking out another glum-looking young man from the backdoor of a large hotel. The time is the 1920s or the 1930s. Once the moustachioed man goes back inside the doorway, Roman approaches just in time to catch an even better dressed middle-aged man, whom he asks for a job. This man turns out to be Albin, nephew of Hotel Pacific owner Pancer (Randa), who hires Roman on the spot.

Roman is taken inside to serve as a busboy and is roomed with the diminutive Fryc (Skamene), also a young man from the country, who very quickly introduces him to the hierarchy and rules among the hotel's kitchen staff. Roman very quickly finds out that violence is an everyday occurrence casually meted out by the senior waiters.

One day Fryc is offered a shot at joining the waiting staff on the condition that he trains someone to replace him tending the bar. He picks Roman, a choice agreed to by the hotel owner, Pancer. Albin is given fifty zloty for Roman's new uniform but passes on only thirty to the new waiter. Roman excels at the bar and is soon transferred to the waiting staff, much to the consternation of Fryc, who had been promised the move. (Albin gives the reason that Fryc needs to improve his spoken Polish before he can ascend to the wait staff.) The two young men fall out as a consequence, though by this point Roman has garnered a new ally in Henek, a libidinous veteran waiter who teaches him how to get back at the senior waiters by stealing from the till.

Roman's initial exuberance rapidly dissipates as finds himself constantly hounded by the hotel's upper-class clientele, who turn out to be very demanding, often insulting, and extremely unsympathetic. Rarely does a "please" or "thank you" come from a diner and one of his regular customers, Baron Humaniewski (Wollejko), makes repeated unwanted sexual advances to him. Roman is also regularly persecuted by the head waiter, Fornalski (Wilhelmi), the mustachioed middle-aged man encountered at the beginning of the film.

Fornalski carelessly leaves a part of a sliced lemon on the floor and a senior waiter slips on it, hitting his head on the tile floor in a fatal fall. Fryc reveals to Roman that it was caused by Fornalski's negligence. Roman threatens to report Fornalski to the waiters' union, causing the flustered maître d' to not only end his harassment of Roman, but also help the young man join the senior waiting staff.

In time Roman passes the waiting exam, qualifying to become a senior waiter. Fryc fails it for the third time in a row, however, and on New Year's Eve unsuccessfully attempts suicide, as a result of which he is fired from the hotel.

Some time passes, by which point Roman has grown a mustache and is in a relationship with Hela (Celinska), who also works in the tearoom. Their affair ends prematurely when Hela is fired by Pancer, who has forbidden his employees from romancing each other.

After seeing Hela off at the train station, Roman is accosted by Fryc, who has become a vagrant and sleeps in the station waiting room. The two men catch up over vodka in the station café, during the course of which they become progressively more inebriated. Fryc reveals that he has been offered a position to manage a country inn by the elderly widow who inherited the place. Fryc paints a bucolic picture of the inn as surrounded by livestock, wild game, and well-stocked trout ponds. The mutual joy they derive from badmouthing the hotel and its rules proves fleeting, however, and the two former roommates part on bad terms, with Fryc telling Roman to fuck off.

The next day Roman is driven to rage by a drunken diner in front of the tearoom clientele when the customer, as an ill-advised sort of apology for his bad behavior, insists the waiter take one of his sweets and even tries—over the strong objection of both the diner's wife and Roman himself—to physically force the candy into Roman's mouth. Roman tells his co-workers that he felt that he was being treated as one would treat a horse. This altercation earns him a strong rebuke from Fornalski, who by this point has taken Albin's place as manager. Roman is sent upstairs to meet with Pancer and though he fears he will be fired, it turns out that the owner only wants his help in an ongoing investigation of embezzlement.

Roman works out that Fornalski is the embezzler wanted by Pancer, but keeps this information to himself, to the horror of the more worldly Henek, who says she would have blackmailed the older man. However, Roman has a change of heart upon learning that Pancer was the one who had snitched on his relationship with Hela.

To Fornalski's alarm Roman enters Pancer's office. In the final scenes, Roman is seen at a train station.

== Cast ==
- Marek Kondrat – Roman Boryczko
- Roman Wilhelmi – Robert Fornalski
- Roman Skamene – Fryc
- Čestmír Řanda – Pancer
- Michał Pawlicki – Albin
- Martin Hron – Henek
- Stanisława Celińska – Hela
- Joanna Kasperska – Paulina
- Jaroslava Schallerová – Zośka
- Włodzimierz Boruński – Editor
- Czesław Wołłejko – Baron Humaniewski
- Tadeusz Drozda – Waiter
- Zdzisław Maklakiewicz – Waiter
- Bronislav Poloczek – Waiter
- Stanisław Zaczyk
- Ewa Ciepiela – Prostitute
- Václav Lohniský – Sinajský
- Juliusz Lubicz-Lisowski – Guest in the Restaurant
