= Jerzy Bończak =

Polish actor

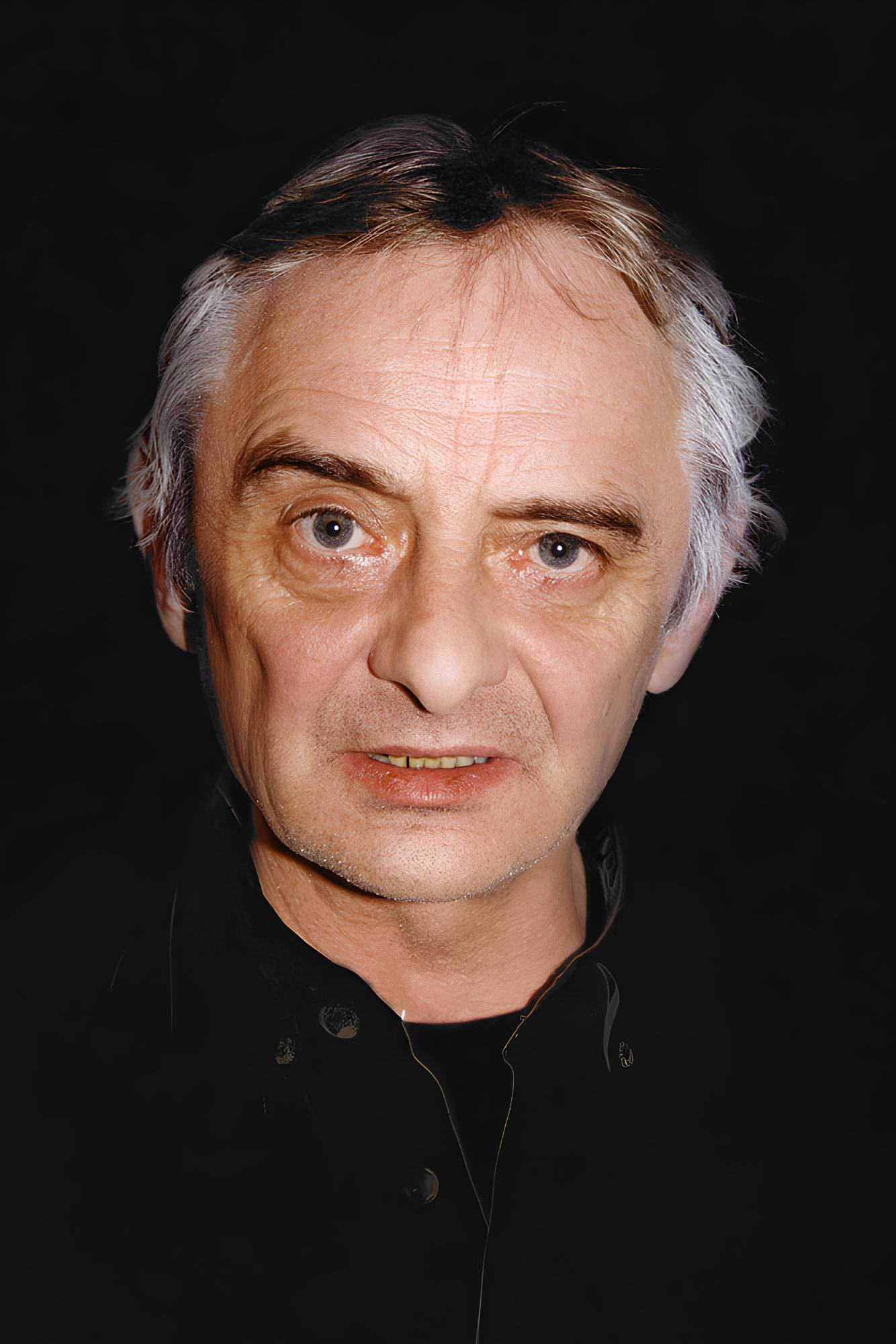
- Born: 29 July 1949 (age 76); Bieżuń, Poland
- Occupation: Actor
- Years active: 1980–present

Jerzy Bończak (born 29 July 1949 in Bieżuń) is a Polish actor. He appeared in the television series Aby do świtu... in 1992. He also played Daniel Czapliński in the Polish movie With Fire and Sword.

== Selected filmography ==
- Teddy Bear (1980) as Chrostowicz
- Olympics 40 (1980) as Jacques
- The Tribulations of Balthazar Kober (1988) as Flamand Varlet
- Nothing Funny (1995) as the technician
- A Trap (1997) as Bartender Lesio
- Mulan (1998) as Yao (voice, Polish dubbing)
- Pigs (1992) as Roman "Chemik" Bluszcz
- With Fire and Sword (1999) as Daniel Czapliński
- Battle of Warsaw 1920 (2011) as captain Kostrzewa
- The Pagemaster (1994) as Horror (voice, Polish dubbing)
- The New Scooby Doo Movies (2002) as Jonathan Winters / Maude Frickert (voice, Polish dubbing)
- Mulan II (2004) as Yao (voice, Polish dubbing)
