= All That I Love =

2009 Polish film

- Directed by: Jacek Borcuch
- Written by: Jacek Borcuch
- Produced by: Renata Czarnkowska-Listos; Jan Dworak
- Starring: Mateusz Kosciukiewicz
- Cinematography: Michal Englert
- Edited by: Agnieszka Glińska; Krzysztof Szpetmański
- Release date: 18 September 2009
- Running time: 95 minutes
- Country: Poland
- Language: Polish
- Box office: $1,000,482

All That I Love (Polish: Wszystko, co kocham) is a 2009 Polish film directed by Jacek Borcuch. The film has been selected for competition in the Word Cinema Dramatic Competition at the Sundance Film Festival 2010. It was also selected as the Polish entry for the Best Foreign Language Film at the 83rd Academy Awards but it didn't make the final shortlist.

== Plot ==
All That I Love is a film about a young musician, Janek, in a coastal city of Poland during the early period of the Solidarity strikes, martial law in Poland, manifestations, and general political turmoil. Janek's father is an official of the local military police, and while he utilizes that connection to secure rehearsal space for his punk band (in the officer's hall of the police barracks), he rebels against the official repression of lyrical freedom and political activism. His love interest, Basia, is the daughter of an active Solidarity member, who initially forbids Basia from seeing Janek due to his governmental connections. They continue to see each other secretly, and their romance inspires Janek to send demos to a prestigious Polish summer music festival. He is selected to play, but his attempt to get his politically sensitive lyrics past the state censor ends badly, and he is forbidden from playing. However, at the end-of-year concert, at which the censor turns up personally to attempt to prevent Janek from singing Solidarity-friendly songs to his classmates, turns into a youth celebration of Solidarity.

== Cast ==
- Mateusz Kościukiewicz – Janek
- Olga Frycz – Basia Martyniak
- Jakub Gierszał – Kazik
- Andrzej Chyra – Janek's father
- Anna Radwan – Ela – Janek's mother
- Katarzyna Herman – Sokołowska
- Mateusz Banasiuk – Staszek
- Marek Kalita – Cpt. Sokołowski
- Igor Obłoza – 'Evil'
- Zygmunt Malanowicz – Janek's grandfather
- Elżbieta Karkoszka – Janek's grandmother

== See also ==
- List of submissions to the 83rd Academy Awards for Best Foreign Language Film
- List of Polish submissions for the Academy Award for Best Foreign Language Film
