= Dolce Fine Giornata =

2019 Polish film

- Film poster
- Directed by: Jacek Borcuch
- Written by: Jacek Borcuch
- Starring: Krystyna Janda
- Release dates: 28 January 2019 (Sundance); 10 May 2019 (Poland)
- Country: Poland
- Languages: Italian; Polish; French
- Box office: $747 716

Dolce Fine Giornata (Polish: Słodki koniec dnia) is a 2019 Polish drama film directed by Jacek Borcuch. It was screened in the World Cinema Dramatic Competition section at the 2019 Sundance Film Festival.

== Cast ==
- Krystyna Janda as Maria Linde
- Kasia Smutniak as Anna
- Vincent Riotta as Commissar Lodovici
- Antonio Catania as Antonio
- Robin Renucci as "Le Monde" Journalist
- Lorenzo de Moor as Nazeer
- Miła Borcuch as Elena
- Arjun Talwar as Mina
