= Agnieszka Wagner =

Polish actress

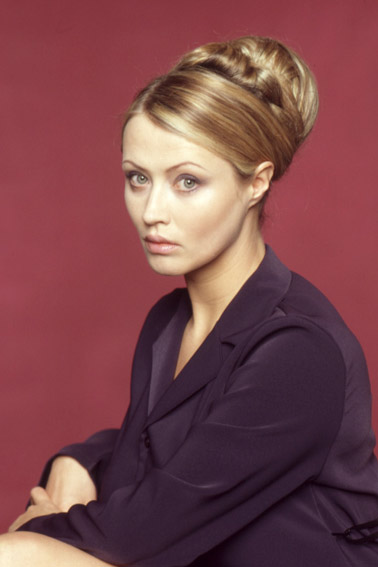
- Born: 17 December 1970 (age 55); Warsaw, Poland
- Occupation: Actress
- Years active: 1989-present

Agnieszka Wagner (born 17 December 1970) is a Polish actress. She has appeared in more than fifty films since 1989.

== Selected filmography ==
Year	Title	Role	Notes
1988	Serenite	Marysia	TV movie
1989	Dotknieci	Olenka	
1990	Crimen	Lea Wojnarowska	TV miniseries
1993	The Hollow Men	Rita	
1996	Szamanka	Anna	
1996	Nothing Funny	Adam's Mother	
1997	The Truce	Galina	
1997	Shanghai 1937	Helen Russell	
1999	All My Loved Ones	Anna	
2001	Quo Vadis	Poppaea Sabina	
2004	Out of Reach	Detective Kasia Lato	
2011	Letters to Santa	Malgorzata	
