= Kiler-ów 2-óch =

Kilerów 2-óch
- Directed by: Juliusz Machulski
- Written by: Juliusz Machulski, Ryszard Zatorski
- Starring: Cezary Pazura; Małgorzata Kożuchowska; Jerzy Stuhr; Janusz Rewiński; Katarzyna Figura; Marek Kondrat; Jolanta Fraszyńska; Jan Englert
- Music by: Elektryczne Gitary; Kuba Sienkiewicz
- Release date: 8 January 1999
- Running time: 127 minutes
- Country: Poland
- Languages: Polish; Spanish

Kiler-ów 2-óch (English: Two Hitmen) is a sequel to the 1997 film Kiler. The film premiered 8 January 1999 in Poland and, like the first film, achieved financial and critical success.

== Plot ==
Time flies and Jurek Kiler has as a practical matter forgotten that he used to work as a taxi driver and was suspected of a series of murders. He is now a public figure, and together with his girlfriend Ewa runs a foundation which successfully raises money from all over the world. This idyllic and charitable life is thwarted, however when the two real murderers who are serving time, Siara and Lipski, do everything they can to kidnap and assassinate by proxy. They first hire a world-famous Polish assassin code-named Jackal, then a Cuban who is allegedly Kiler's double. Both spectacularly fail in many attempts to carry out their "responsibilities". The situation becomes even more perplexing when Lipski obtains a pass for his daughter Dona's wedding, only to learn that she has fallen for Kiler whom she wants to marry instead...

== Credited cast ==
- Cezary Pazura as Jurek Kiler and José Arcadio Morales
- Małgorzata Kożuchowska as Ewa Szańska
- Janusz Rewiński as Siara (Siarzewski)
- Jan Englert as Ferdynand Lipski
- Jerzy Stuhr as Ryba
- Katarzyna Figura as Rysia, Siara's Wife
- Jolanta Fraszyńska as Lipski's daughter
- Krzysztof Kiersznowski as Wąski
- Zdzisław Ambroziak as sports commentator

== Awards and nominations ==
- In 2000, the movie was nominated for the ORZEŁ (Polish Academy Award) for the best achievement in sound editing (Marek Wronko) and the best achievement in editing (Jadwiga Zajicek).

== Notes ==
- Siara's (Janusz Rewiński) villa in the suburbs of Warsaw is exactly the same building as the residency of Edward Nowak (Janusz Rewiński) in the Polish serial “Tygrysy Europy”.
- When the Young Wolves enter Kiler's flat, the film on TV is “Szwadron”, which had been directed by Juliusz Machulski.
- In the scene at the airport, Juliusz Machulski is holding a plate with “Barry Sonnenfeld” written on it, who was the director in talks to make an American version of the first film.

== Mistakes ==
- A video camera operator is visible in Aldona's glasses.
- When Morales drives up outside Kiler's block of flats, he parks his hummer next to a van. When Kiler comes down, the car is parked further.
