= Todo mujer =

- Film poster
- Directed by: Rafael Gordon
- Screenplay by: Rafael Gordon
- Produced by: Rafael Gordon
- Starring: Isabel Ordaz
- Cinematography: David Omedes
- Edited by: Julia Juaniz
- Music by: Jorge Magaz
- Production company: Rafael Gordon Producciones
- Release dates: December 11, 2015 (Festival Internacional de Cine de Hermosillo); April 28, 2017

Todo mujer is a 2015 Spanish drama film directed by Rafael Gordon and portrayed by Isabel Ordaz, Julia Quintana, Miguel Torres, Arantxa de Juan and Alfonso Arranz.

It receives 14 chosen candidates.

== Cast ==
- Alfonso Arranz Lago
- Arantxa de Juan as Erika
- Andrea Domingo Gómez
- Isabel Ordaz as Amalia
- Paula Pérez
- Julia Quintana
- Miguel Torres García
