= Adek Drabiński =

Polish film director

- Born: 16 October 1948 (age 77); Łódź, Poland
- Occupations: Film director, screenwriter
- Years active: 1994-present

Adek Drabiński (born 16 October 1948) is a Polish film director and screenwriter. He has been nominated for two Golden Lions and has received Gdynia Film Festival Award for Best New Director, as well as Andrzej Munk Film Award.

== Education and Career ==
Drabiński is a graduate of Academy of Fine Arts in Łódź's Faculty of Painting (1974) and Leon Schiller National Film School's Film and Television Direction Department (1979). His work in television includes the episodes of the TVP series Sensations of the 20th Century and Polish remake of The Odd Couple, the latter of which he also co-created. His 1997 film A Trap was entered into the 20th Moscow International Film Festival.

== Selected filmography ==
- 1991 – Szuler (Cheat)
- 1997 – A Trap
- 2000 – Kalipso
- 2009 – Dom nad rozlewiskiem (TV series)
- 2010 – Miłość nad rozlewiskiem (TV series)
- 2011 – Życie nad rozlewiskiem (TV series)
- 2012 – Nad rozlewiskiem... (TV series)
- 2018–2021 – The Lousy World (TV series)
