= Zdzisław Ambroziak =

Polish volleyball player

Personal information
- Full name: Zdzisław Stanisław Ambroziak
- Nationality: Polish
- Born: 1 January 1944 Warsaw, Poland
- Died: 23 January 2004 (aged 60) Warsaw, Poland

Volleyball information

Career
- Years: Team
- 1963–1970 1970–1972 1972–1976 1976–1979 1979–1984: AZS AWF Warsaw; Skra Warsaw; Pallavolo Padova; Volley Gonzaga Milano; Di.Po. Vimercate

National team
- Years: Team
- 1963–1972: Poland (220)
Honours
Men's volleyball
Representing Poland
FIVB World Cup
Silver medal – second place	1965 Poland
CEV European Championship
Bronze medal – third place	1967 Turkey

Zdzisław Stanisław Ambroziak (1 January 1944 – 23 January 2004) was a Polish volleyball player, sports journalist, sports commentator, a member of the Poland national team in 1963–1972, and a participant in the Olympic Games (Mexico 1968, Munich 1972).

== Personal life ==
Amroziak was born in Warsaw, he graduated from the Józef Piłsudski University of Physical Education in Warsaw. He was married to Ewa. In 1999, he appeared in the Polish movie, Kiler-ów 2-óch, starring as a sports commentator. He died after a long illness in a hospital in Warsaw.

== Honours ==
=== Club ===
- Domestic
  - 1964–65 Polish Championship, with AZS AWF Warsaw
  - 1965–66 Polish Championship, with AZS AWF Warsaw
  - 1967–68 Polish Championship, with AZS AWF Warsaw

== Memory ==
In 2007, was founded the Foundation of Zdzisław Ambroziak. The Foundation aims, among others, to support sports journalists attitude of fair play and promote various forms of youth education. Since 2006, the tournament named Memoriał of Zdzisław Ambroziak, is organized for volleyball clubs to honor his memory.
