= A Trap =

1997 film

- Film poster
- Directed by: Adek Drabiński
- Written by: Adek Drabiński
- Produced by: Janusz Kijowski
- Starring: Marek Kondrat
- Release dates: July 1997 (Moscow); 5 December 1997 (Poland)
- Running time: 105 minutes
- Country: Poland
- Language: Polish

A Trap (Polish: Pułapka) is a 1997 Polish comedy film directed by Adek Drabiński. It was entered into the 20th Moscow International Film Festival.

== Plot ==
Actor Maciek, an alcoholic and gambler, returns to Poland after many years of living in America. He failed to make a career overseas and hopes to make a life for himself in Poland. However, he has problems with finding his way in the new reality after the fall of the Polish People's Republic, and subsequent attempts to return to his profession end in failure. He accepts a job as a caretaker of Edward Wilk's abandoned house by the sea, but is not aware that it is a trap. There he meets a beautiful neighbor, Ewa, and gets involved in a criminal scandal.

== Cast ==
- Marek Kondrat as Maciek Adamski
- Joanna Benda as Ewka
- Bogusław Linda as Aleksander Szuster
- Zbigniew Zamachowski as Robert 'Bobek' Burski
- Anita Lipnicka as Canary
- Dorota Pomykała as Iwona Babol
- Malgorzata Potocka as TV journalist
- Ewa Salacka as Journalist
- Jerzy Bończak as Bartender Lesio
- Zygmunt Malanowicz as Pianist
- Leon Niemczyk as Police Chief
- Piotr Dejmek as Gas man Wladzio
