= Małgorzata Kożuchowska =

Polish actress (born 1971)

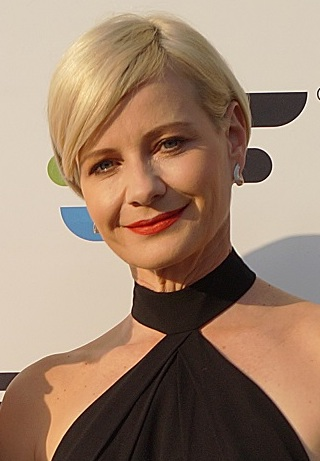
- Małgorzata Kożuchowska (2019)
- Born: Małgorzata Dorota Kożuchowska; April 27, 1971 (age 55); Wrocław, Poland
- Occupations: actress, TV presenter
- Years active: 1993–present
- Spouse: Bartłomiej Wróblewski (m. 2008)

Małgorzata Dorota Kożuchowska (Polish: [mawɡɔˈʐata dɔˈrɔta kɔʐuˈxɔfska]; born April 27, 1971) is a Polish actress and TV presenter. She is best known as Hanna Mostowiak in the very popular Polish television series, M jak miłość, Ewa Szańska in the movies Kiler and Kiler-ów 2-óch, and Natalia Boska in Rodzinka.pl.

She was awarded the Medal for Merit to Culture – Gloria Artis and the Order of Polonia Restituta.

== Life and career ==
She is the eldest daughter of Leszek Kożuchowski, a doctor of pedagogical sciences, and Jadwiga Kozuchowska, a teacher. She has two sisters, Maja and Hanna. She grew up in Toruń.

In 1994, she graduated from the Aleksander Zelwerowicz National Academy of Dramatic Art in Warsaw. After earning her diploma, she joined the ensemble of Warsaw's Dramatic Theater, with which she was associated until 2005. Then she was an actress at the National Theater until 2014. She also worked with Warsaw theaters: Na Woli, Komedia and IMKA, in addition to the National Cultural Center in Warsaw, the Polish Theater in Bielsko-Biała, the Polish Radio Theater and the Polish Television Theater.

She gained popularity for her film and television roles in productions such as Kiler (1997), Kiler-ów 2-óch (1999), M jak miłość (2000–2011), Zróbmy sobie wnuka (2003), Tylko miłość (2007–2009), Rodzinka.pl (2011–2020), Prawo Agaty (2012–2015) and Druga szansa (2016–2018).

She is involved in dubbing; she provided the voice of Gloria in Madagascar (2005), Madagascar 2 (2008) and Madagascar 3 (2012), and the White Queen in Alice in Wonderland (2010) and Alice Through the Looking Glass (2016).

She hosted the TVP1 program My, Wy, Oni.

She was an ambassador for cosmetic brands Kolastyna and Avon, and appeared in advertising campaigns for the Aviva insurance group, the Bonarka City Center shopping center and the Tous jewelry company.

In 2006, she released her debut studio album W futrze, which she recorded with the band Futro. The album was a supplement to Elle magazine and was released under the auspices of Radio PiN.

Since October 2007, she has been an ambassador, and since June 2010 also a member of the Program Council of the Mam Marzenie Foundation.

In 2011, she received the St. Brother Albert Medal for her support of people with disabilities.

Since November 2012, she has published in the weekly Sieci.

From 2018 to 2020, she was vice president of the Union of Polish Stage Artists.

== Personal life ==
She is married to Bartłomiej Wróblewski. The wedding took place in 2008 at the Holy Cross Church in Warsaw. The couple was married by Father Piotr Pawlukiewicz. They have a son, Jan Franciszek (born October 10, 2014). She is a practicing Catholic.

== Filmography ==
- 1994: Ptaszka as Maria
- 1994: Oczy niebieskie as Harcerka
- 1994-1995: Fitness Club as Maryjka
- 1995: Młode wilki as Marzanna
- 1996: Sukces... as Kochanka Kaweckiego
- 1996: Pasaż (Passage) as Betty
- 1997: Pierwsza miłość as Ela
- 1997: Zaklęta as Ola
- 1997: Kiler as Ewa Szańska
- 1997: Rodziców nie ma w domu as Kosa
- 1997: Sława i chwała as women
- 1997: Złotopolscy as Jagoda (1998)
- 1998: Matki, żony i kochanki (series II) as Edyta
- 1999: Uciekając przed
- 1999-2005: Na dobre i na złe as Jolanta Majewska (1999)
- 1999: Lot 001 as Agata
- 1999: Kiler-ów 2-óch as Ewa Szańska
- 2000-2011: M jak miłość as Hanna Mostowiak
- 2000-2001: Przeprowadzki as Lilianna Hirsz
- 2000: Co nie jest snem (TV play) as Eunice
- 2001: Wtorek as Małgosia
- 2002: Krzyżacy 2 as Danusia
- 2003: Zróbmy sobie wnuka as Zosia Koselówna
- 2003: Superprodukcja
- 2003: Sloow as Super Girl
- 2004: Kilka godzin z Claire as Claire
- 2005: M jak miłość, czyli poznajmy się as herself
- 2005: Komornik as Anna
- 2006: Living & Dying
- 2007: Dlaczego nie! as Renata
- 2007: Hania as Kasia
- 2011-2020: Rodzinka.pl series as Natalia Boska
- 2012-2013: Prawo Agaty series as Maria Okońska
- 2016-2018: Druga szansa series as Monika Borecka
- 2018: The Plagues of Breslau as Helena Rus
- 2019: The Motive series as Luiza Porębska
- 2019: I'll Find You as Joanna Pułaska, Robert's mother
- 2019: Proceder as "Łysa"
- 2020: Bad Boy as Anna Dąbrowska
- 2020: Prawdziwe Uczucia as Teresa
- 2020: Banksterzy as Anna
- 2020: Czyściec as Fulla Horak
- 2020: Amatorzy as herself
- 2021: Wyszyński. Zemsta czy przebaczenie as Róża Czacka
- 2021: To musi być miłość as Roma
- 2022: Gierek as Stanisława Gierek
- 2022: Krime Story. Love Story as Kamila's mother
- 2022: Wygrać Marzenia as Maria
- 2022: Zołza as Anna Sobańska
- 2022: Gdzie diabeł nie może, tam baby pośle as Dorota Lis
- 2023: Gdzie diabeł nie może, tam baby pośle 2 as Dorota Lis
- 2023: The Peasants as The Organist's Wife
- 2025: Aniela as Aniela Krajewska

== Polish dubbing ==
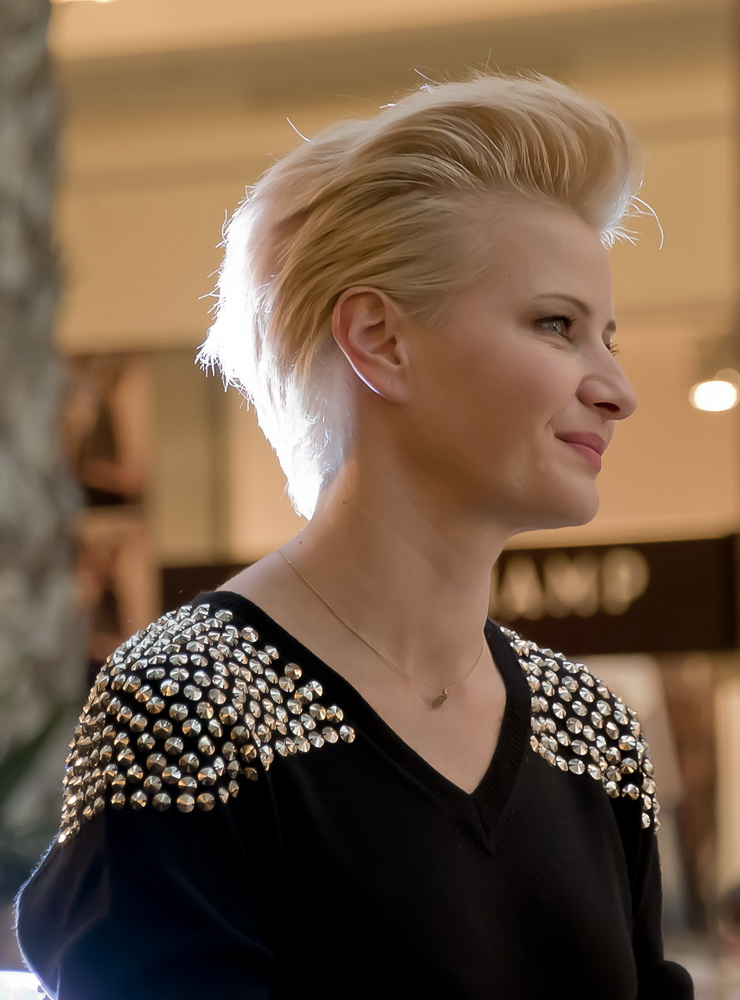
Małgorzata Kożuchowska, 2013

- 1993: Kalifornia, as Adele Corners
- 1994: Molly, as Daniela
- 2001: Monsters, Inc., as Celinka
- 2001: Mewtwo's return!, as Domino 009
- 2001: Lady and the Tramp II: Scamp's Adventure, as Lili
- 2001–2003: Braceface, as Sharon Spitz
- 2003: Old School, as Heidi
- 2004: Pinocchio 3000 as Pinokio
- 2004: Around the World in 80 Days, as Monique
- 2005: Valiant, as Charllote De Gaulle
- 2005: Madagascar, as Gloria
- 2006: Franklin and the Turtle Lake Treasure – sings
- 2006: Everyone's Hero, as Yankee Irving
- 2008: Madagascar 2, as Gloria
- 2010: Alice in Wonderland, as White Queen
- 2010: Belka i Strelka. Zvezdnye sobaki, as Belka
- 2010: Merry Madagascar, as Gloria
- 2012: Madagascar 3, as Gloria
- 2013: Kumba, as Mama W

== Theater ==
Dramatyczny Theatre in Warsaw

- 1994: Człowiek z La Manchy
- 1994: Szósty stopień oddalenia, as Tess
- 1995: Przygody Tomka Sawyera, as Ciocia
- 1995: Magia grzechu, as Łakomstwo
- 1995: Szkarłatna wyspa
- 1996: Ildefonsjada
- 1996: Jak wam się podoba as Febe and Dworzanin
- 1997: Elektra Sofoklesa
- 1997: Wiśniowy sad as Duniasza
- 1997: Poskromienie złośnicy as Bianka
- 1998: Adam Mickiewicz śmieszy tumani przestrasza
- 1998: Niezidentyfikowane szczątki, as Candy
- 1999: Opera żebracza Vaclava Havla, as Polly
- 2001: Alicja w krainie czarów, as Królowa
- 2003: Obsługiwałem angielskiego... as Blanche
- 2005: Opowieść o zwyczajnym szaleństwie, as Jana

Theatre Comedy in Warsaw

- 2006: One as Ryba

The National Theatre

- 2004: Błądzenie po peryferiach as Albertynki, Alicja, Rita
- 2005: Kosmos as Lena
- since 2007: Miłość na Krymie as Tatiana Jakowlewna Borodina
- since 2009: Umowa, czyli łajdak ukarany, as Hrabina
- since 2013: Cat on a hot tin roof, as Margaret

== Awards ==
- 2004: Telekamera award 2004 Best Actress.
- 2004: Gold duck Best Actress
- 2005: Telekamera award 2005 Best Actress.
- 2005: Silver butterfly - for a healthy lifestyle popularization
- 2007: Woman Of The Year "Glamour" as Actress
- 2008: Super Jantar
- 2013: Viva! Najpiękniejsi the most beautiful Pole
- 2013: Woman of decade "Glamour"
- 2013: Crystal Boar - for a creative cooperation between actor and director
