= Klaudia Halejcio =

Polish actress

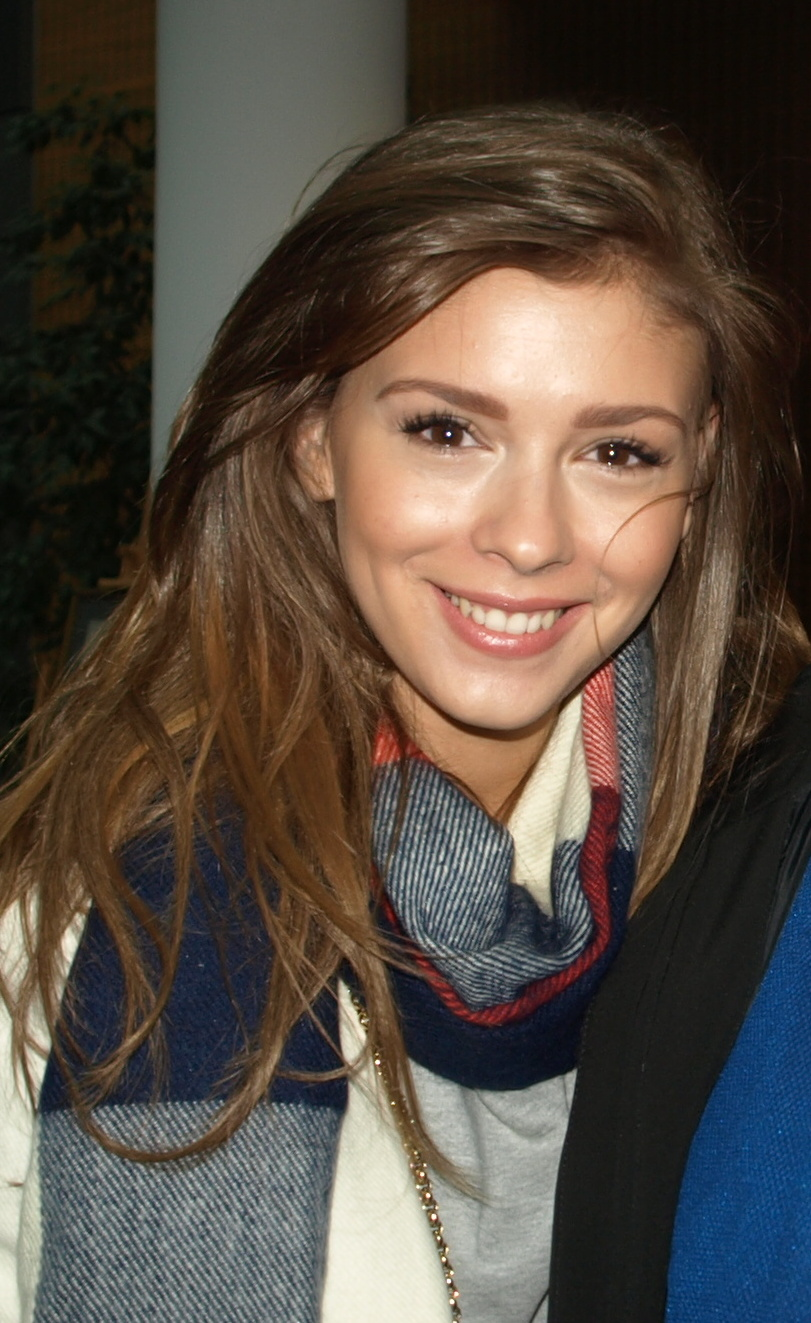
- Halejcio in 2014

Klaudia Halejcio is a Polish TV and film actress. She starred in series such as Pierwsza Milosc (2004) and Television Theater (1953), as well as the movie Szczescia Chodza Parami (2022).

== Education ==
She was a student at the University of Social Sciences and Humanities in Warsaw in the field of social psychology.

== Acting career ==
She has been acting since the age of four. In the years 2000–2005, she took part in the performance Ceremony at the Rozmaitości Theater in Warsaw.

She is mainly known for playing in the TV series: Złotopolscy, First Love, Rezydencja, Recipe for Life and Hotel 52.

== Personal life ==
In the years 2014–2016, she was associated with the dancer Tomasz Barański, whom she met during training for the Dancing with the Stars program. In 2019, she announced the end of another relationship. Since 2020, her life partner is businessman Oskar Wojciechowski. The couple lives in Warsaw's Ursynów. They have a daughter, Nel (born in 2021). Her sister Monika currently lives in Norway.
