= Kiler (film) =

- Poster
- Directed by: Juliusz Machulski
- Written by: Piotr Wereśniak
- Produced by: Jacek Moczydłowski; Juliusz Machulski; Jacek Bromski
- Starring: Cezary Pazura; Małgorzata Kożuchowska; Jerzy Stuhr; Janusz Rewiński; Katarzyna Figura; Jan Englert
- Release date: 17 October 1997
- Running time: 104 minutes
- Country: Poland
- Language: Polish

Kiler (English: The Hitman) is a 1997 Polish comedy by Juliusz Machulski, starring Cezary Pazura, Jerzy Stuhr, Janusz Rewiński, Jan Englert, Katarzyna Figura and Małgorzata Kożuchowska. The movie is a story of a taxi driver named Jerzy (short: Jurek) Kiler who is mistaken for a notorious mercenary killer by the police as well as the mafia. The film has a sequel; Kiler-ów 2-óch.

== Plot ==
Police discover the body of gangster Andrzej G., codename "Gilotyna." Warsaw taxi driver Jerzy Kiler (Cezary Pazura) watches the chaos surrounding the crime scene. The next morning, he is awakened by gunfire from a police rifle, and he is dragged from his apartment by anti-terrorist police officers. During interrogation, he learns that a weapon (a sniper rifle) was found in his taxi, and he is identified as a hitman nicknamed "Kiler," whom no one has ever seen. Unable to clear himself of the charges, Jurek is imprisoned. As a killer, he is respected among his fellow prisoners, so he tries to conceal his identity. He accidentally causes the death of one of the inmates, "Uszat" (Władysław Komar), who is persecuting other inmates. This further strengthens Kiler's authority, confirming everyone's belief that he is the real killer. While being transported to a mysterious detention center, he is rescued by the men (Paweł Wawrzecki and Mirosław Zbrojewicz) of one of "his" employers, Stefan "Siara" Siarzewski (Janusz Rewiński). The protagonist has no choice but to continue posing as a hitman. Within a short time, he receives several assassination orders, and one of his victims is Ewa Szańska (Małgorzata Kożuchowska), a journalist he met in prison. The killer has no intention of killing her; he meets with her and reveals to her that he is not a murderer. "Siara" doesn't insist on ordering Ewa's murder, but he is very keen to kill Ferdynand Lipski (Jan Englert) and take half a banknote (2,000 Colombian pesos), which is a bargaining chip in the transaction of a huge sum of cash from Mr. Waldek (Paweł Nowisz) for cargo at Okęcie. Jerzy Kiler goes to Ferdynand Lipski, but this makes matters even worse, as he orders him to kill "Siara." Jerzy must convince "Siara" that he killed Ferdynand Lipski, and Ferdynand Lipski that he killed "Siara."

Together with Ewa and "Kudłaty" (Sławomir Sulej), a former cellmate, Kiler records a short film that bears a striking resemblance to a news report. Jerzy secretly inserts the cassette into a VCR and plays the recording to "Siara," disguised as a true crime report. "Siara" readily believes in the murder of Ferdynand Lipski and demands the half of the banknote Ferdynand possesses. Kiler tells "Siara" that he will have it tomorrow. The next day, he puts "Siara" to sleep, and Ewa's friend, Stanisław (Maciej Figurski), makes Stefan look as if he had been shot in the head. Jurek Kiler brings the "body" to Ferdynand Lipski, who hands him the half of the banknote. Kiler drives "Siara" back, and when he wakes up, he shows him the half of the banknote. Then, both "Siara" and Ferdynand Lipski commission Jerzy Kiler to collect a shipment of money for cargo at Okęcie. There, "Siara" meets Ferdynand Lipski, and a fight breaks out between them, and both are arrested by Commissioner Ryba (Jerzy Stuhr). As Jerzy Kiler and Ewa go to collect the money, they are stopped by the real hitman, Kiler (Sławomir Orzechowski), who has kept his identity secret until now. However, he is quickly arrested. Jerzy Kiler and Ewa collect the money and are at a loss for what to do with it. At the end of the film, it is revealed that Jerzy Kiler donated the money to Polish filmmaking, a decision he later regretted.

== Remake ==
Seeing the movie's tremendous success in Poland, two film studios from the United States started negotiations to buy the rights to make an English version of the film: Hollywood Pictures offering $600 000, and 20th Century Studios, offering $10 000. The rights were sold to Hollywood Pictures who paid half of the money on the spot and agreed to pay the rest after the end of film production. Barry Josephson was planned to be the producer, and Barry Levinson, the director. The original director of Polish film, Juliusz Machulski was planned to be the executive producer. After the poor reception of Wild Wild West made by Josephson and Levinson, two stopped working together, putting aside the possibility of working on the film adaptation. Barry Sonnenfeld was also interested in directing the movie. Jim Carrey and Will Smith were rumored to be considered to portray the main character of the film The film was set to happen in New York City, with the plot revolving around a taxi driver who accidentally got confused for a world-famous hitman. The production was meant to be appropriated into the American market with different humour. The production of the film was planned to start in 1999 or 2000; this never occurred due to the bankruptcy of the studio. In 2007, the studio responsible for the production was disestablished.

== Cast ==
- Cezary Pazura – Jerzy Kiler
- Małgorzata Kożuchowska – Ewa Szańska
- Jerzy Stuhr – Jerzy Ryba
- Janusz Rewiński – Stefan "Siara" Siarzewski
- Katarzyna Figura – Ryszarda "Gabrysia" Siarzewska
- Jan Englert – Ferdynand Lipski
- Krzysztof Kiersznowski – "Wąski"
- Marek Kondrat – director Mieczysław Klonisz
- Jan Machulski – Zenek
- Sławomir Sulej – "Kudłaty"
- Piotr Wawrzyńczak – "Iks"
- Lech Dyblik – "Wstrętny"
- Władysław Komar – "Uszat"
- Paweł Deląg – Jarosław
- Marcin Figurski – Stanisław
- Alex Murphy – Hector Sosa
- Szymon Majewski – Mioduch
- Paweł Wawrzecki – UOP officer
- Mirosław Zbrojewicz – UOP officer
- Maciej Kozłowski – prosecutor
- Olaf Lubaszenko – himself
- Joanna Janikowska – Evita
- Sławomir Orzechowski – the real Kiler
- Małgorzata Drozd – secretary
- Cezary Żak – barman

== See also ==
- Polish cinema
