= Sylwester Kaliski =

Polish engineer, professor and general

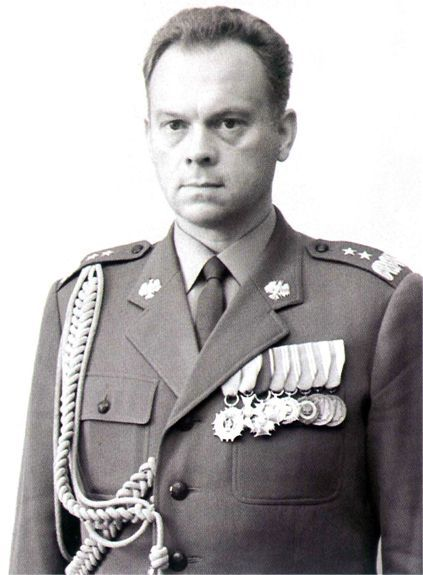

Minister of Science, Higher Education and Technology
- In office 16 September 1978 – 17 December 1974
- Preceded by: Jan Kaczmarek
- Succeeded by: Janusz Górski

Personal details
- Born: 17 December 1925 Toruń, Second Polish Republic
- Died: 16 September 1978 (aged 52) Warsaw, Poland
- Party: Polish United Workers' Party
- Awards

Military service
- Allegiance: Polish People's Republic
- Branch/service: Polish People's Army
- Years of service: 1949–1978
- Rank: Generał dywizji (Major general)

Sylwester Kaliski (19 December 1925 – 16 September 1978) was a Polish engineer, professor and military general. He was a member of the Polish Academy of Sciences (PAN).

Born in Toruń, Kaliski was a specialist in the field of applied physics. He developed the theory of continuous amplification of ultra and hyper-sounds in semiconductive crystals and obtained plasma temperature of tens of millions of kelvins using laser impulse. He died in Warsaw, Poland in car crash. It has been speculated that Kaliski was killed by the Soviet KGB, as he headed the Polish clandestine program of developing thermonuclear devices intended for military use. The program began on orders from the highest levels of Polish communists and was reportedly opposed by the Soviet Union. He was honored with an entry in the "Honorary Book of Soldierly Deeds" in 1973.

== Awards and decorations ==
- Order of the Builders of People's Poland (posthumously, 1978)
- Order of the Banner of Labour, 1st Class (1968)
- Commander's Cross of the Order of Polonia Restituta (1973)
- Knight's Cross of the Order of Polonia Restituta (1961)
- Gold Cross of Merit (1957)
- Medal of the 30th Anniversary of People's Poland (1974)
- Gold Medal of the Armed Forces in the Service of the Fatherland (1970)
- Silver Medal of the Armed Forces in the Service of the Fatherland
- Bronze Medal of the Armed Forces in the Service of the Fatherland
- Gold Medal of Merit for National Defence (1974)
- Silver Medal of Merit for National Defence
- Bronze Medal of Merit for National Defence
- Order of Military Merit with Great Star (Yugoslavia, 1967)
- Grand Officer of the Order of Prince Henry (Portugal, 1976)
- Order of Friendship of Peoples (Soviet Union, 1973)
