= Blue Mountain (film) =

1997 film

- Directed by: Thomas Tanner
- Written by: Gabriele Strohm; Thomas Tanner
- Starring: Chandra Goetz
- Cinematography: Philippe Cordey
- Edited by: Bernhard Lehner
- Music by: Carl Hänggi
- Release date: August 1996
- Running time: 95 minutes
- Country: Switzerland
- Language: Swiss German

Blue Mountain is a 1997 Swiss drama film directed by Thomas Tanner. It follows a twelve-year-old girl who becomes friends with an older neighbour while living in a troubled family. It premiered in August 1996 and later screened at several international festivals.

== Synopsis ==
Sonia is twelve years old and lives with her family in the Villa Balmer. She is troubled by dark spirits in her dreams and performs a private ritual to protect herself. She becomes friends with her sixteen-year-old neighbour Melanie, who introduces her to a very different way of life. Then Sonia's life changes suddenly.

== Cast ==
The cast includes:

- Chandra Goetz as Sonia
- Sabina Lüthi as Melanie
- Eva Scheurer as Renate
- Wolf Hofer as Manfred
- Daniel Bill as Röffe

== Reception ==
Variety described the film as a smoothly executed drama about domestic child abuse, but said it was “too patly written” to give the subject its intended force. The review criticised the ending as contrived, while noting the film’s somber, naturalistic tone and professional technical work. Filmdienst described the film as a sensitive and moving chamber drama that handled its subject carefully and without voyeurism. SRF described the film as a poignant dialect drama whose subtle treatment of a taboo subject was balanced by a hopeful portrayal of female friendship.

== Festival screenings ==
The film premiered in August 1996. It was later screened at festivals including the Locarno Film Festival in August 1996, the Montreal World Film Festival in August 1996, AFI Fest in October 1996, the Solothurn Film Festival in January 1997, and the Shanghai International Film Festival in October 1997. It was also screened in competition at the Moscow International Film Festival in July 1997.
