= Marek Kondrat =

Polish actor and director

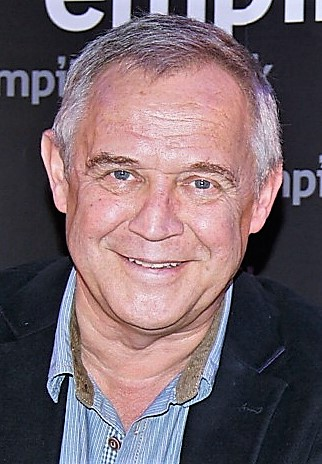
- Marek Kondrat (2011)
- Born: 18 October 1950 (age 76); Kraków, Poland
- Education: National Academy of Dramatic Art in Warsaw
- Occupations: Actor; director; screenwriter; entrepreneur
- Years active: 1961–2010; 2025–present
- Spouses: Ilona Gagajek (m. 1972; div. 2009); Antonina Turnau (m. 2015)
- Children: 3

Marek Tadeusz Kondrat (Polish: [ˈmarɛk taˈdɛuʂ ˈkɔndrat]; born 18 October 1950) is a Polish film, television and theatre actor, film director, screenwriter and entrepreneur. He is regarded as one of the most popular and successful Polish actors of his generation. He gained nationwide recognition by starring in such films as Man of Iron (1981), C.K. Dezerterzy (1985), Pigs (1992), Colonel Kwiatkowski (1996), Sir Thaddeus (1999), Operacja Samum (1999) and Day of the Wacko (2002).

His numerous accolades include the Zbigniew Cybulski Award for his role in Hotel Pacific (1979), the Knight's Cross of the Order of Polonia Restituta for his outstanding contributions to Polish cinema (2002) and the Polish Academy Award for Best Actor for his performance in the comedy-drama film Day of the Wacko (2003).

== Career ==
He is a graduate of the Jan Śniadecki High School No. 30 in Warsaw. In 1972, he graduated from the National Academy of Dramatic Art in Warsaw (PWST). He played his first role as a child in 1961 film Historia żółtej ciżemki.

Between 1972 and 1973, he worked at the Stanisław Wyspiański Silesian Theatre in Katowice. He also worked at the Dramatic Theatre in Warsaw (1973–1984, 1987–1988), French Institute (1984), New Theatre (1985–1986), Comedy Theatre (1989), Za Dalekim (1990), Ateneum Theatre (1992–1999) and Zygmunta Hübner's Theatre (2002).

His most notable roles, which made him one of the most popular actors in Poland, are featured in such films as Janusz Majewski's 1975 film Hotel Pacific, Andrzej Wajda's 1976 film Smuga cienia where he played the role of Joseph Conrad, Krzysztof Zanussi's 1981 biographic film From a Far Country, Janusz Majewski's 1985 comedy film C.K. Dezerterzy, Kazimierz Kutz's 1996 film Pułkownik Kwiatkowski, Marek Koterski's 2002 film Day of the Wacko and 2006 film We're All Christs. Since 1998 he has been cooperating with ING Bank Śląski.

In 2002, he was awarded the Commander's Cross of the Order of Polonia Restituta.

In the summer of 2006, he read the novel "Casino Royale" on RMF FM. In 2007, he planned to revolutionize the Polish domestic wine market by introducing Winarium wine stores in every city with a population of over 100,000. On March 5, 2007 he announced the end of his acting career, he played the last role in the film Mała matura 1947 (2010). He was the co-author of the book E-lementarz Internet, published in 2009.

He ran a chain of restaurants called "Prohibicja", which he founded with Zbigniew Zamachowski, Wojciech Malajkat and Bogusław Linda. He completed a wine connoisseur course in Bordeaux.

== Personal life ==
In 1972, Kondrat married Ilona (née Gagajek) with whom he has two sons: Wojciech and Mikołaj. The couple divorced in 2009. On 19 September 2015 he married Antonina Turnau, daughter of Grzegorz Turnau.

== Awards ==
- 1979 – Leon Schiller Award
- 1979 – Zbigniew Cybulski Award by "Ekran" magazine,
- 1980 – Award for "Zegarek" role, "Igraszki z diabłem", "Sułkowski" at IV Polish TV Festival in Olsztyn
- 1987 – "Gwiazda Sezonu" at LLF in Łagowie
- 1993 – Award for "Mazep" role in Theatr Ateneum in Warsaw
- 1995 – Wiktor (most popular actor)
- 1995 – Złota Odznaka w plebiscycie "TeleRzeczpospolitej" – "Złota piątka" (Gold five)
- 1996 – First Place at III "Złota Piątka Telerzypospolitej"
- 1997 – Hand on Stars avenue
- 1997 – "Złota Kaczka" in category: best polish actor; for 1996
- 1998 – Wiktor '97 in category: best actor and SuperWiktor '97
- 1998 – "TeleKamera 1998", award from "TeleTydzień" readers in category: actors (16 January)
- 1999 – Wiktor '98 in category: best actor (20 February)
- 1999 – Statue "Feniks"
- 1999 – 7 May at Piotrowska avenue in Łódź shows Kondrat star
- 2003 – "Złota Kaczka" in category: best polish actor; for 2002 (24 February)

=== Movie awards ===
- 2006 – "The Call of the Toad" – Eagle, Polish movie award
- 2005 – "Trzeci" – Viareggio (MFF) "Platinum Award " for best actor
- 2003 – "Dzień Świra" – Eagle, Polska Nagroda Filmowa w kategorii: best male role
- 2002 – "Weiser" – Orzeł, Polska Nagroda Filmowa (nominacja) w kategorii: best male role; for year 2001
- 2002 – "Dzień świra" – Gdynia (Festiwal Polskich Filmów Fabularnych) best male role
- 2001 – "Prawo ojca" – Orzeł, Polska Nagroda Filmowa (nominacja) w kategorii: best male role; for year 2000
- 1999 – "Złoto dezerterów" – Orzeł, Polska Nagroda Filmowa (nominacja) w kategorii: best male role; for year 1998
- 1999 – "Prawo ojca" – Gdynia (FPFF) "Złoty Klakier", nagroda Radia Gdańsk dla reżysera najdłużej oklaskiwanego filmu
- 1999 – "Prawo ojca" – Gdynia (Festiwal Polskich Filmów Fabularnych) Jury award
- 1995 – "Pułkownik Kwiatkowski" – Gdynia (Festiwal Polskich Filmów Fabularnych) best male role
- 1977 – "Zaklęte rewiry" – Panama (MFF)
- 1976 – "Zaklęte rewiry" – Złota Kamera (przyznawana przez pismo "Film")

== Filmography ==
- The Doll (2026)
- Maszyna losująca (2007),
- Ryś (2007), as Kreda
- Wszyscy jesteśmy Chrystusami (2006), as Adaś Miauczyński (55)
- The Call of the Toad (2005), as Marczak
- Solidarność, Solidarność... (2005), as Marek ("Sushi")
- Trzeci (2004), as Stary
- Superprodukcja (2003), as Folksdojcz
- Haker (2002), as inspektor policji
- Dzień świra (2002), as Adaś Miauczyński
- Pieniądze to nie wszystko (2001), as Tomasz Adamczyk
- Weiser (2000), as Paweł Heller
- Prawo ojca (1999), jako Michał Kord
- Pan Tadeusz (1999), as Hrabia
- Operacja Samum (1999), as Józef Mayer
- With Fire and Sword (1999) as Jan II Kazimierz Waza
- Kiler-ów 2-óch (1999)
- Bill Diamond (1999)
- Złoto dezerterów (1998)
- Siedlisko (1998)
- Ekstradycja 3 (1998)
- Pułapka (1997)
- Pokój 107 (1997)
- Kiler (1997)
- Słodko gorzki (1996)
- Słaba wiara w opowieści weekendowe (1996)
- Nocne graffiti (1996)
- Ekstradycja 2 (1996)
- Autoportret z kochanką (1996)
- Pułkownik Kwiatkowski (1995)
- Ekstradycja (1995)
- Zawrócony (1994)
- Szczur (1994)
- Panna z mokrą głową (1994)
- Taranthriller (1993)
- Straszny sen Dzidziusia Górkiewicza (1993)
- Skutki noszenia kapelusza w maju (1993)
- Lepiej być piękną i bogatą (1993)
- Koloss (1993)
- Człowiek z ... (1993)
- Wszystko, co najważniejsze (1992)
- Sauna (1992)
- Psy (1992)
- Enak (1992)
- Czy ktoś mnie kocha w tym domu ? (1992)
- V.I.P. (1991)
- Obywatel świata (1991)
- Kuchnia polska (1991)
- Po własnym pogrzebie (1989)
- Po upadku. Sceny z życia nomenklatury (1989)
- Lawa (1989)
- Czarny wąwóz (1989)
- Weryfikacja (1986)
- Mrzonka (1985)
- C. K. Dezerterzy (1985)
- Rok spokojnego słońca (1984)
- Kobieta w kapeluszu (1984)
- Dom wariatów (1984), as Adaś Miauczyński
- Bez końca (1984)
- Pastorale heroica (1983)
- Epitafium dla Barbary Radziwiłłówny (1982)
- Danton (1982)
- Yokohama (1981)
- Dziecinne pytania (1981)
- Dreszcze (1981)
- Człowiek z żelaza (1981)
- Grzechy dzieciństwa (1980)
- Lekcja martwego języka (1979)
- Sprawa Gorgonowej (1977)
- Pokój z widokiem na morze (1977)
- Smuga cienia (1976)
- Zaklęte rewiry (1975)
- Koniec wakacji (1974)
- Między brzegami (1962)
- Historia żółtej ciżemki (1961) as Wawrzek
