= Day of the Wacko =

2002 Polish comedy-drama film

- Film poster
- Polish: Dzień świra
- Directed by: Marek Koterski
- Written by: Marek Koterski
- Screenplay by: Marek Koterski
- Produced by: Juliusz Machulski; Włodzimierz Otulak
- Starring: Marek Kondrat; Janina Traczykówna; Andrzej Grabowski; Michał Koterski; Joanna Sienkiewicz; Monika Donner-Trelińska
- Cinematography: Jacek Bławut
- Edited by: Ewa Smal
- Music by: Jerzy Satanowski
- Production companies: Studio Filmowe "Zebra"; Vision Film Production; Non Stop Film Service
- Distributed by: Vision
- Release date: 7 June 2002
- Running time: 93 minutes
- Country: Poland
- Language: Polish
- Box office: $1,277,521

Day of the Wacko (Polish: Dzień świra) is a 2002 Polish comedy-drama about a day in the life of Adaś Miauczyński, a frustrated, divorced, middle-aged teacher who has OCD. Written and directed by Marek Koterski, the film stars Marek Kondrat, Janina Traczykówna, Andrzej Grabowski, Michał Koterski, Joanna Sienkiewicz, and Monika Donner-Trelińska. It is the sixth in a nine-part series of films about the character Miauczyński. Each story showcases a different aspect or era of his life, often with little continuity between them.

Among others, Day of the Wacko picked up several prizes at the 2003 Polish Film Awards: Kondrat won Best Actor in a Leading Role and Koterski Best Screenplay. At the 27th Polish Film Festival, Koterski was awarded a Golden Lion and the award of the Polish Filmmakers Association for "creative representation of reality"; Kondrat won Best Actor and Maria Chilarecka won for sound. The film received two Eagle Awards, for Best Leading Male Role and Best Screenplay. Day of the Wacko was also awarded the Prize of the President of the Association of Polish People of Film.

== Cast ==
- Marek Kondrat as Adaś Miauczyński
- Janina Traczykówna as Adaś's mother
- Andrzej Grabowski as Rączka
- Michał Koterski as Sylwuś
- Joanna Sienkiewicz as Adaś's ex-wife
- Monika Donner-Trelińska as Ela
