= Michał Koterski =

Polish actor (born 1979)

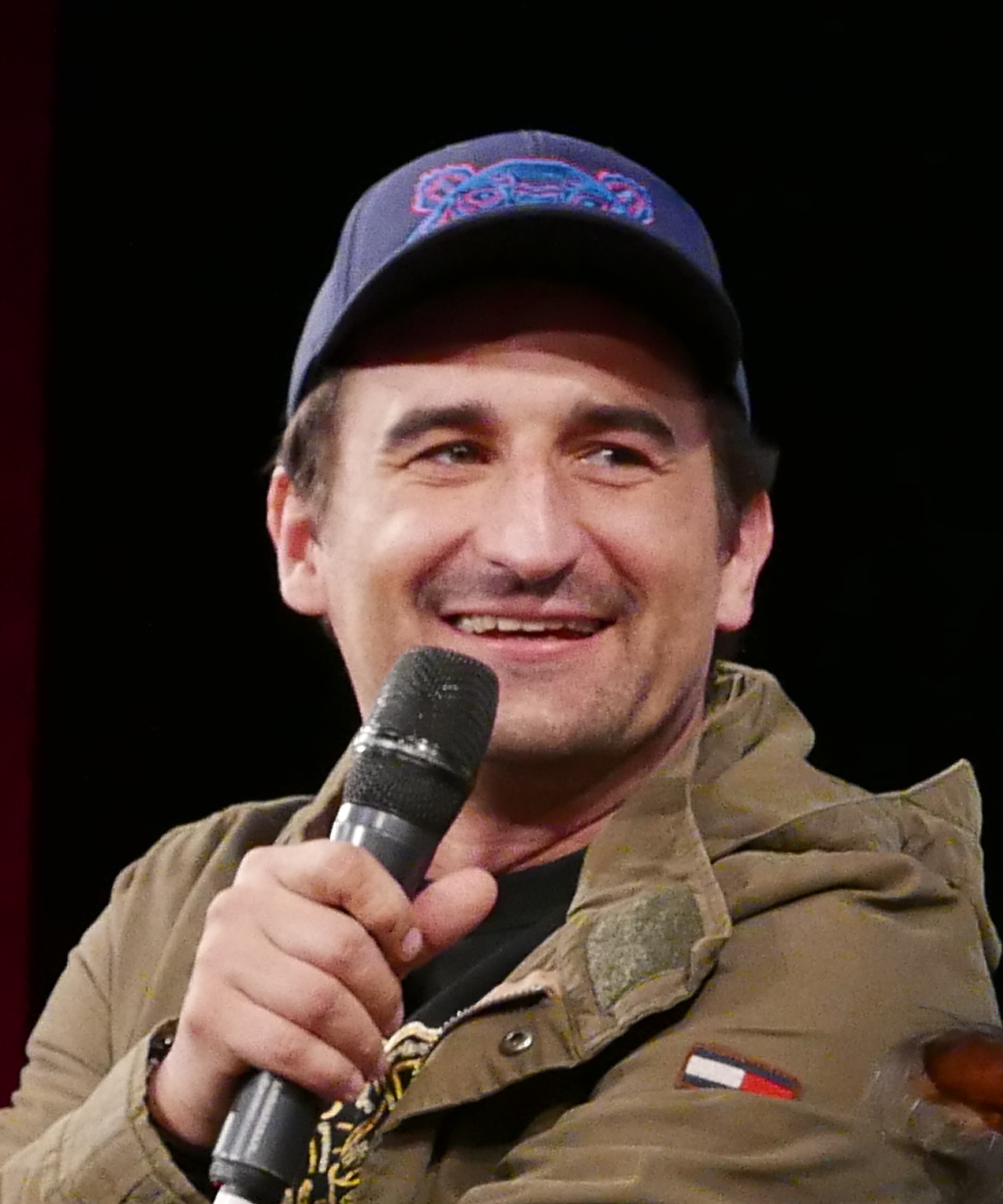
- Koterski in 2019
- Born: 29 December 1979 (age 45); Kraków, Poland
- Occupation(s): Actor, stand-up comedian

Michał Koterski, also known as Misiek Koterski (born 29 December 1979 in Kraków) is a Polish actor, TV presenter and stand-up comedian. Son of director Marek Koterski and Iwona Ciesielska.

== Biography ==
He is known for the roles in the films of his father, in which he played Sylwuś, son of Adam Miauczyński Dzień świra (Day of the Wacko). The hallmark of the actor is his style of playing (which consists of the actors characteristic feminine personality)– artist calls it simply "being himself on a daily basis". He participated in the production of the morning radio show Antyradio, where he was reading blogs of prominent politicians inter alia Renata Beger and Wojciech Wierzejski.

He is a cousin with Maciej Koterski who is playing character of Piotruś Wolański in the films Kogel-mogel and Galimatias, czyli kogel-mogel II.

He appeared in third season of the show Jak oni śpiewają (How They Sing). On April 12, 2008 he has been eliminated from the show in favour of Aneta Zając and Grażyna Szapołowska. He finished with the ninth place.

== Selected filmography ==
- 1999: Ajlawju as Sylwuś Miauczyński
- 2002: Superprodukcja as a gas station worker
- 2002: Dzień świra (Day of the Wacko) as Sylwuś Miauczyński
- 2006: Królowie śródmieścia as Słoniu
- 2006: Wszyscy jesteśmy Chrystusami (We're All Christs) as Sylwuś Miauczyński
- 2007: 7 Dwarves: The Forest Is Not Enough as Pinocchio (Polish language dub voice)
- 2009–present: Pierwsza miłość (First Love) as Henryk "Kaśka" Saniewski
- 2010: Jeż Jerzy (George the Hedgehog) as Zenek (voice)
- 2011: Kac Wawa as customer of the brothel
- 2021: Gierek as Edward Gierek
