= Marek Koterski =

Polish film director (born 1942)

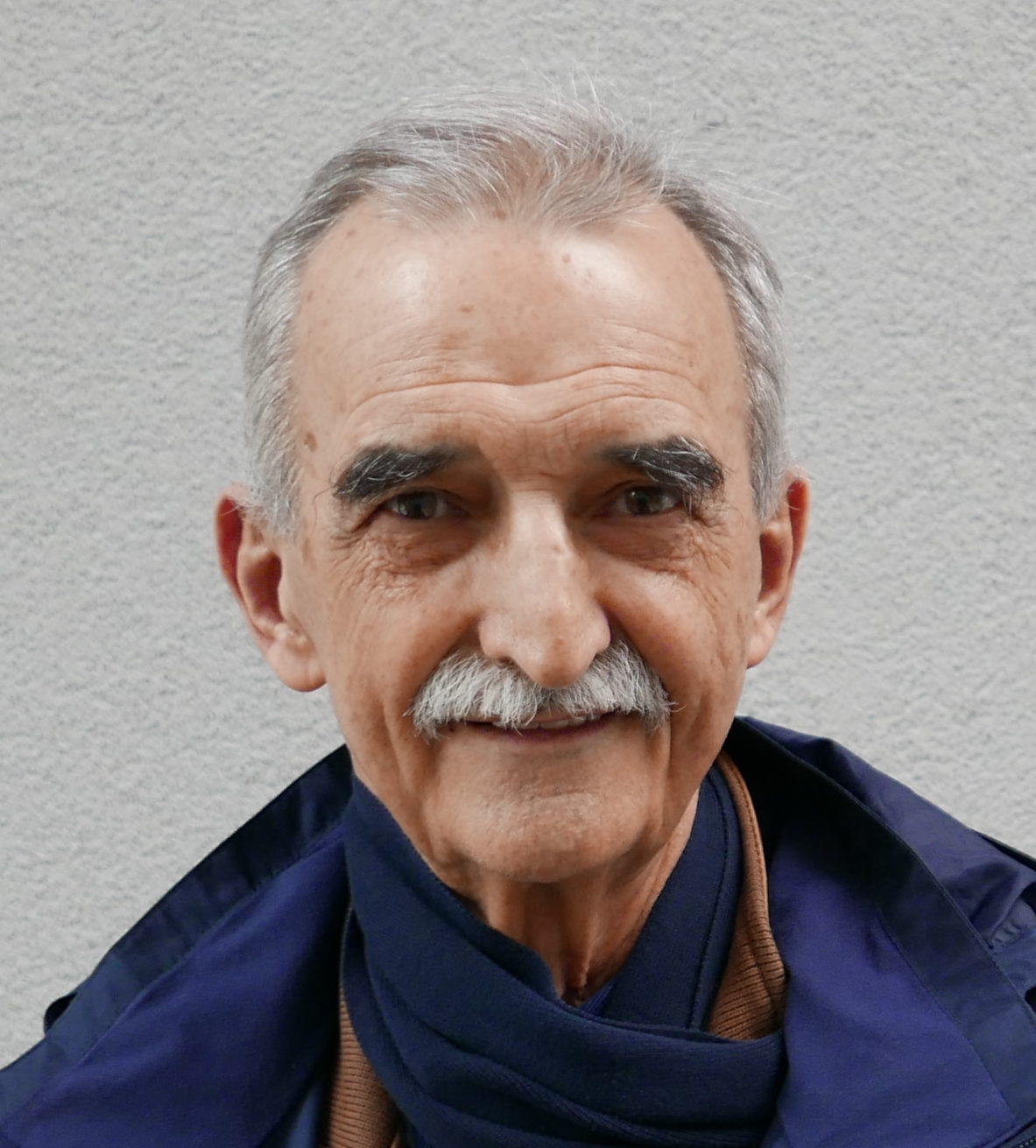
- Koterski in 2019
- Born: 3 June 1942 (age 84); Kraków, Poland
- Occupations: Film director; theatre director; screenwriter; actor; playwright
- Known for: Writing and directing nine films about the character Adaś Miauczyński
- Notable work: Day of the Wacko, We're All Christs

Marek Koterski (born 3 June 1942) is a Polish film and theatre director, screenwriter, actor, and playwright.

== Life and career ==
In 1972, he graduated in directing from the Łódź Film School. Initially, he made documentaries, but in 1984, he gained recognition in Poland thanks to the semi-autobiographical tragicomedy Dom wariatów. This was the first of nine films Koterski went on to write and direct about his alter ego, the character Adaś Miauczyński.

Several of these, including the 1986 sequel to Dom wariatów, titled Życie wewnętrzne; the sixth and seventh films in the loose series, titled Day of the Wacko (2002) and We're All Christs (2006), respectively; and the final one, 7 uczuć (2018), won accolades. Życie wewnętrzne won a Silver Lion at the 1987 Gdynia Film Festival, and in 2002, Koterski won a Golden Lion for Day of the Wacko. In 2006, he received another Golden Lion as Best Director, this time for We're All Christs, and he repeated this feat in 2018 with 7 uczuć.

Koterski's son Michał is an actor. He portrayed Adaś Miauczyński in 7 uczuć.

== Filmography ==
- Dom wariatów (1984)
- Życie wewnętrzne (1986)
- Porno (1989)
- Nothing Funny (1995)
- Ajlawju (1999)
- Day of the Wacko (2002)
- We're All Christs (2006)
- Baby są jakieś inne (2011)
- 7 uczuć (2018)

== Awards ==
- Golden Lion – Best Director: Day of the Wacko (2002)
- Golden Lion – Best Director: We're All Christs (2006)
- Gold Medal for Merit to Culture – Gloria Artis (2014)
- Golden Lion – Best Director: 7 uczuć (2018)
