= Cinema of Poland =

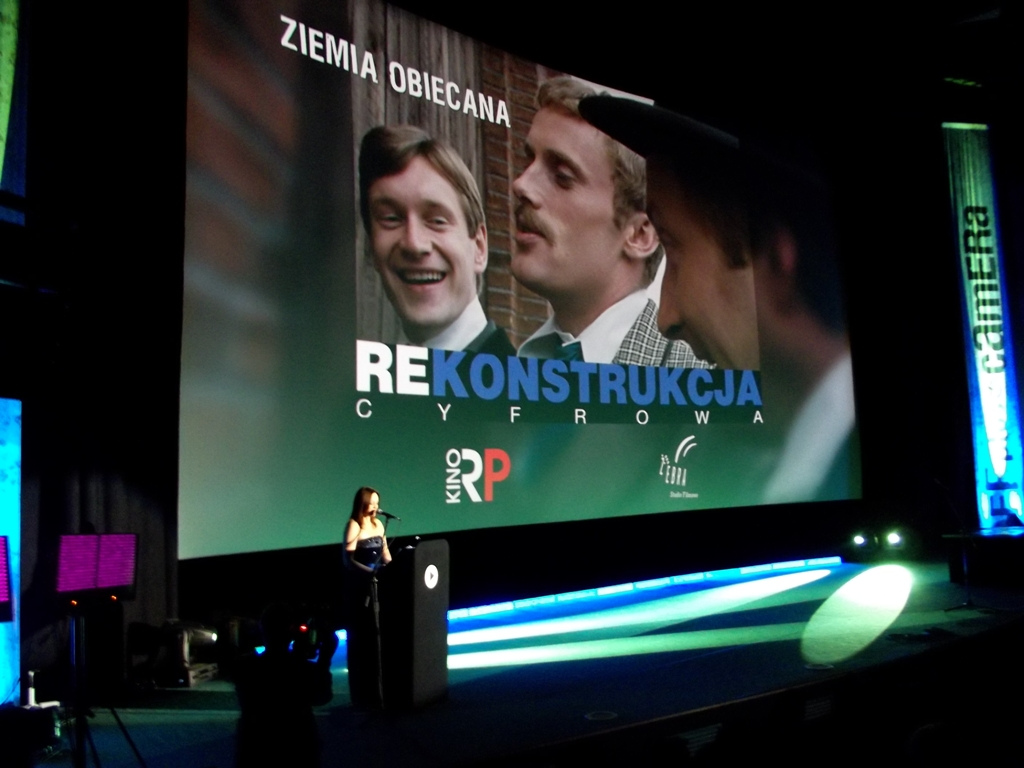
- Film festival Off Plus Camera in Kraków, 2012
- No. of screens: 1,600 (2024)
  - Per capita: 3.2 per 100,000 (2011)
- Main distributors: United International Pictures 26.8% Forum Film 12.8% Imperial Cinepix 11.9%

Produced feature films (2024)
- Total: 62

Number of admissions (2024)
- Total: 49,500,000
  - Per capita: 1 (2012)

Gross box office (2010)
- Total: PLN 703 million (~€167.8 million)
- National films: PLN 43.5 million (~€10.4 million) (6.2%)

The history of cinema in Poland is almost as long as the history of cinematography, and it has universally recognized achievements, even though Polish films tend to be less commercially available than films from several other European nations.

After World War II, the communist government built an auteur-based national cinema, trained hundreds of new directors and empowered them to make films. Filmmakers like Roman Polański, Krzysztof Kieślowski, Agnieszka Holland, Andrzej Wajda, Andrzej Żuławski, Andrzej Munk, and Jerzy Skolimowski impacted the development of Polish film-making. In more recent years, the industry has been producer-led with finance being the key to a film being made.

== History ==
=== Early history ===
Animation made from preserved frames of Ślizgawka w Łazienkach

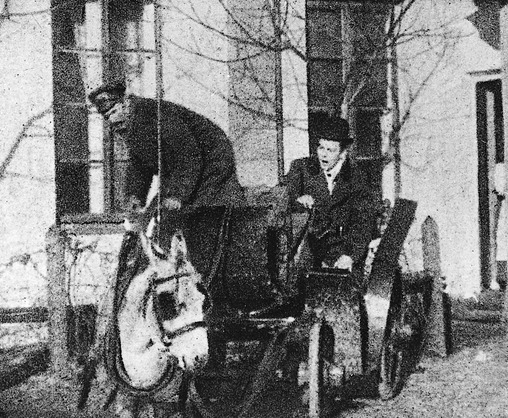
Preserved frame from Przygoda dorożkarza - cabman notices that someone replaced his horse with a donkey

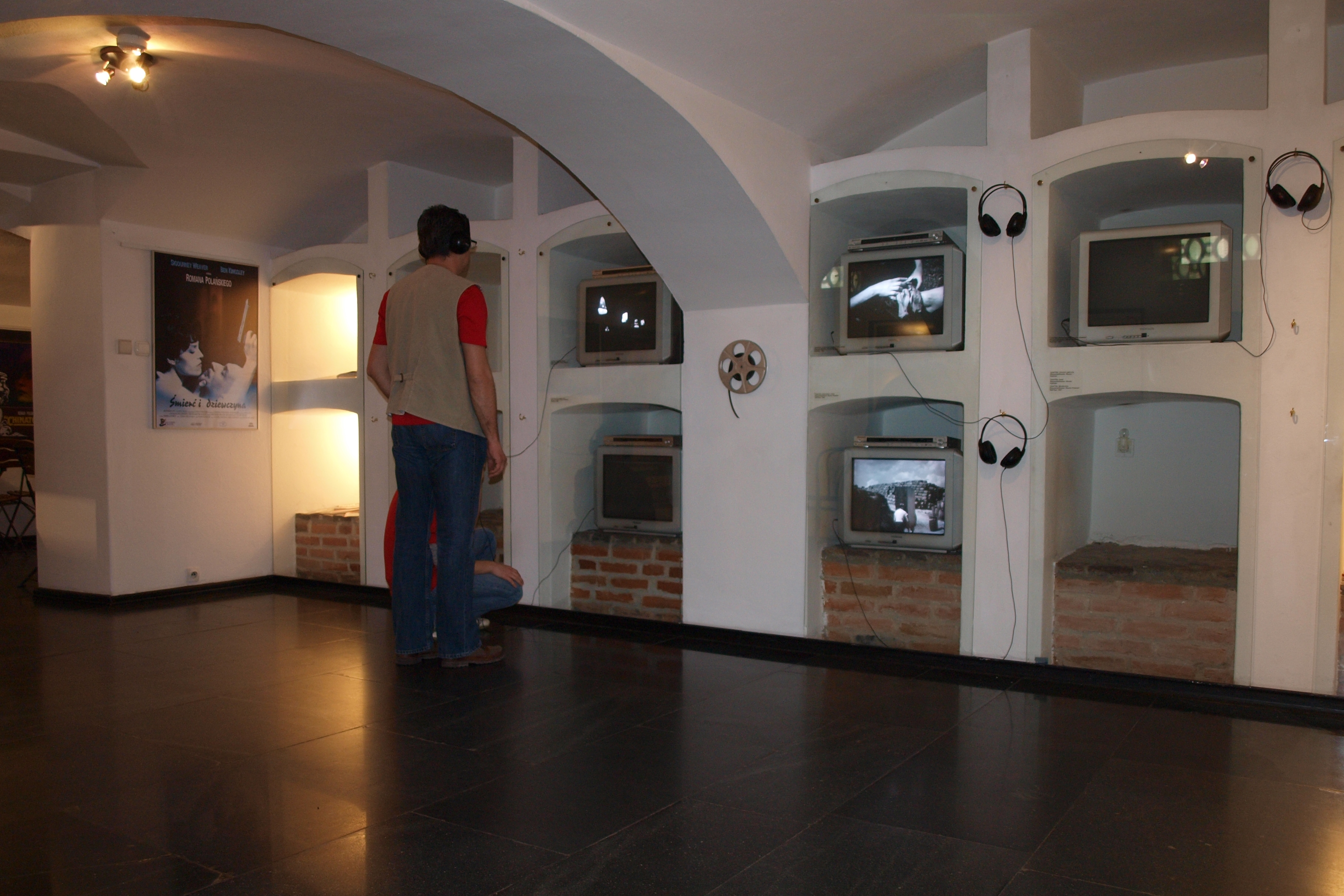
Museum of cinematography in Łódź

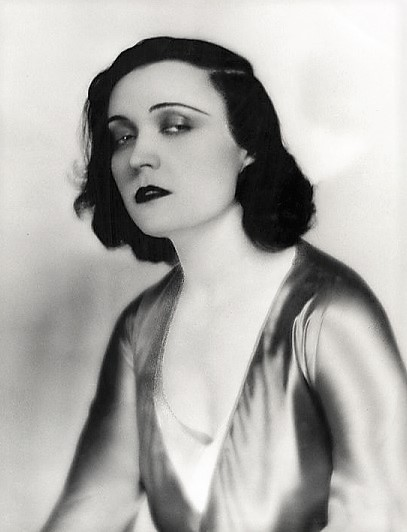
Pola Negri, Polish femme fatale of silent cinema

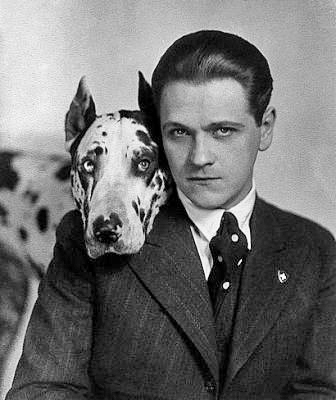
Eugeniusz Bodo, the "King of Polish actors" of the 1930s

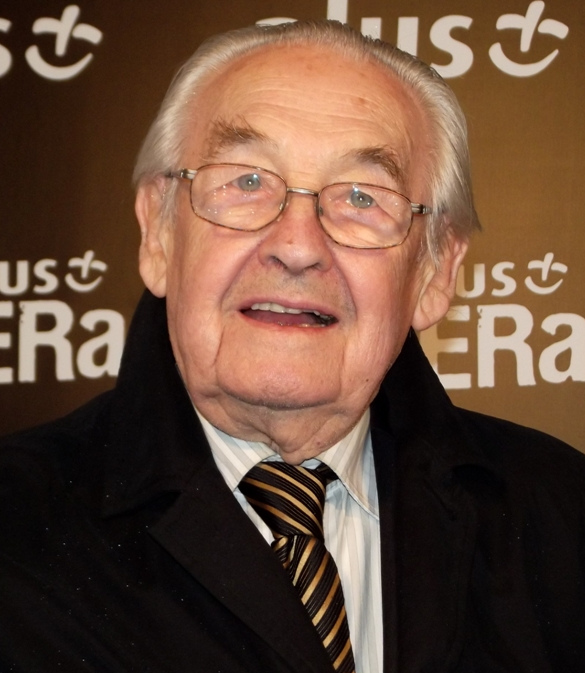
Andrzej Wajda, famous Polish director who received an Honorary Oscar in 2000

The first cinema was founded in Łódź in 1899, several years after the invention of the Cinematograph. Initially dubbed Living Pictures Theatre, it gained much popularity and by the end of the next decade there were cinemas in almost every major town in Poland. Arguably the first Polish filmmaker was Kazimierz Prószyński, who filmed various short documentaries in Warsaw. His pleograph film camera had been patented before the Lumière brothers' invention and he is credited as the author of the earliest surviving Polish documentary titled Ślizgawka w Łazienkach (Skating-rink in the Royal Baths, also known as On skating-rink), made between 1894 and 1896, as well as the first short narrative films Powrót birbanta (Rake's return home) and Przygoda dorożkarza (Cabman's Adventure), both created in 1902. Another pioneer of cinema was Bolesław Matuszewski, who became one of the first filmmakers working for the Lumière company - and the official "cinematographer" of the Russian tsars in 1897.

The earliest surviving short film is Pruska kultura (Prussian Culture) and the earliest surviving feature film is Antoś pierwszy raz w Warszawie (Antoś for the First Time in Warsaw). Both of them were made in 1908, the first one by an unknown director and the second one by Antoni Fertner. The date of Antoś' première, October 22, 1908, is considered the founding date of the Polish film industry. Soon Polish artists started experimenting with other genres of cinema: in 1910 Władysław Starewicz made one of the first animated cartoons in the world - and the first to use the stop motion technique, the Piękna Lukanida (Beautiful Lukanida). By the start of World War I the cinema in Poland was already in full swing, with numerous adaptations of major works of Polish literature screened (notably the Dzieje grzechu, Meir Ezofowicz, and Nad Niemnem).

During World War I the Polish cinema crossed borders. Films made in Warsaw or Vilnius were often rebranded with German-language intertitles and shown in Berlin. That was how a young actress Pola Negri (born Barbara Apolonia Chałupiec) gained fame in Germany and eventually became one of the European super-stars of silent film.

The first woman to direct a film in Poland and the only female film director of the Polish silent film era was Nina Niovilla. She debuted in 1918 in Berlin, and then directed her first Polish film titled Tamara (also known under the title Obrońcy Lwowa) in 1919.

During World War II, Polish filmmakers in Great Britain created the anti-Nazi color film Calling Mr. Smith (1943) about Nazi crimes in occupied Europe and about Nazi propaganda. It was one of the first anti-Nazi films in history being both an avant-garde and a documentary film.

=== After WWII ===
In November 1945, the communist government founded the film production and distribution organization Film Polski, and put the well-known Polish People's Army filmmaker Aleksander Ford in charge. Starting with a few railway carriages full of film equipment taken from the Germans they proceed to train and build a Polish film industry. The FP output was limited; only thirteen features were released between 1947 and its dissolution in 1952, concentrating on Polish suffering at the hands of the Nazis. In 1947, Ford moved to help establish the new National Film School in Łódź, where he taught for 20 years.

The industry used imported cameras and film stocks. At first ORWO black and white film stock from East Germany and then Eastman colour negative stock and ORWO print stocks for rushes and release prints. Poland made its own lighting equipment. Because of the high costs of film stock Polish films were shot with very low shooting ratios, the amount of film stock used in shooting the film to length of the finished film. The equipment and film stock were not the best and budgets were modest but the film makers received probably the best training in the world from the Polish Film School. Another advantage was Film Polski's status as a state organisation, so its film-makers had access to all Polish institutions and their cooperation in making their films. Film cameras were able to enter almost every aspect of Polish life.

The first film produced in Poland following the World War II was Zakazane piosenki (1946), directed by Leonard Buczkowski, which was seen by 10.8 million people (out of 23,8 total population) in its initial theatrical run. Buczkowski continued to make films regularly until his death in 1967. Other important films of the early post-World War II period were The Last Stage (1948), directed by Wanda Jakubowska, who continued to make films until the transition from communism to capitalism in 1989, and Border Street (1949), directed by Aleksander Ford.

By the mid-1950s, following the end of Stalinism in Poland, Film production was organised into film groups. A film group was a collection of film makers, led by an experienced film director and consisting of writers, film directors and production managers. They would write scripts, create budgets, apply for funding off the Ministry of Culture and produce the picture. They would hire actors and crew, and use studios and laboratories controlled by Film Polski.

The change in political climate gave rise to the Polish Film School movement, a training ground for some of the icons of the world cinematography, e.g., Roman Polański (Knife in the Water, Rosemary's Baby, Frantic, The Pianist) and Krzysztof Zanussi (a leading director of the so-called cinema of moral anxiety of the 1970s). Andrzej Wajda's films offer insightful analyses of the universal element of the Polish experience - the struggle to maintain dignity under the most trying circumstances. His films defined several Polish generations. In 2000, Wajda was awarded an honorary Oscar for his overall contribution to cinema. Four of his films were nominated for Best Foreign Language Film award at Academy Awards with seven other Polish directors receiving one nomination each: Roman Polański, Jerzy Kawalerowicz, Jerzy Hoffman, Jerzy Antczak, Agnieszka Holland, Jan Komasa and Jerzy Skolimowski. In 2015, Polish filmmaker Paweł Pawlikowski received this award for his film Ida. In 2019, he was also nominated to the award for his next film Cold War in two categories - Best Foreign Language Film and Best Director.

It is also important to note that during the 1980s, the People's Republic of Poland instituted the martial law to vanquish and censor all forms of opposition against the communist rule of the nation, including outlets such as cinema and radio. A notable film to have emerged during this period was Ryszard Bugajski's 1982 film Interrogation (Przesluchanie), which depicts the story of an unfortunate woman (played by Krystyna Janda) who is arrested and tortured by the secret police into confessing a crime she knows nothing about. The anti-communist nature of the film brought about the film's over seven-year ban. In 1989, the ban was repealed after the overthrow of the Communist government in Poland, and the film was shown in theaters for the first time later that year. The film is still lauded today for its audacity in depicting the cruelty of the Stalinist regime, as many artists feared persecution during that time.

In the 1990s, Krzysztof Kieślowski won a universal acclaim with productions such as Dekalog (made for television), The Double Life of Véronique and the Three Colors trilogy. Another of the most famous movies in Poland is Krzysztof Krauze’s The Debt, which became a blockbuster. It showed the brutal reality of Polish capitalism and the growth of poverty. A considerable number of Polish film directors (e.g., Agnieszka Holland and Janusz Kamiński) have worked in American studios. Polish animated films - like those by Jan Lenica and Zbigniew Rybczyński (Oscar, 1983) - drew on a long tradition and continued to derive their inspiration from Poland's graphic arts. Other notable Polish film directors include: Tomasz Bagiński, Małgorzata Szumowska, Jan Jakub Kolski, Jerzy Kawalerowicz, Stanisław Bareja and Janusz Zaorski.

Among prominent annual film festivals taking place in Poland are: Warsaw International Film Festival, Camerimage, International Festival of Independent Cinema Off Camera, New Horizons Film Festival as well as Gdynia Film Festival and Polish Film Awards.

==== Cinema audience ====
The Communist government invested resources into building a sophisticated cinema audience. All the cinema were state owned and consisted of first run premiere cinema, local cinema and art house cinemas. Tickets were cheap and students and old people received discounts. In the city of Lodz there were 36 cinemas in the 1970s showing films from all over the world. There were the Italian films of Fellini, French comedies, American crime movies such as Don Siegel's "Charley Varrick" . Films were shown in their original versions with Polish subtitles. Anti-Communist and Cold War films were not shown, but a bigger restriction was the cost of some films. There were popular film magazines like "Film" and "Screen", critical magazines such as "Kino". This all helped to build a well informed film audience.

== Polish Film Academy ==
The Polish Film Academy was founded in 2003 in Warsaw and aims to provide native filmmakers a forum for discussion and a way to promote the reputation of Polish cinema through publications, presentations, discussions and regular promotion of the subject in the schools.

=== Awards ===
Since 2003, the winners of the Polish Film Awards are elected by the members of the academy.

- 2003: The Pianist
- 2004: Squint Your Eyes
- 2005: The Wedding
- 2006: The Collector
- 2007: Savior Square
- 2008: Katyń
- 2009: 33 Scenes from Life
- 2010: Reverse
- 2011: Essential Killing
- 2012: Rose
- 2013: Manhunt
- 2014: Ida
- 2015: Gods
- 2016: Body
- 2017: Volhynia
- 2018: Silent Night
- 2019: Cold War
- 2020: Corpus Christi
- 2021: Kill It and Leave This Town
- 2022: Quo Vadis, Aida?
- 2023: EO
- 2024: Green Border
- 2025: The Girl with the Needle

== Film schools ==
Several institutions, both government run and private, provide formal education in various aspects of filmmaking.

- National Film School in Łódź
- Krzysztof Kieślowski Film School at University of Silesia in Katowice
- Szkoła Aktorska Haliny i Jana Machulskich
- Szkoła Wajdy
- AMA Film Academy
- Warszawska Szkoła Filmowa

== Museums of cinematography ==
Two museums devoted to the history of Polish film are located in Łódź:

- the Museum of Cinematography, established in 1986;
- the National Centre for Film Culture, opened in 2013.

== Personalities ==
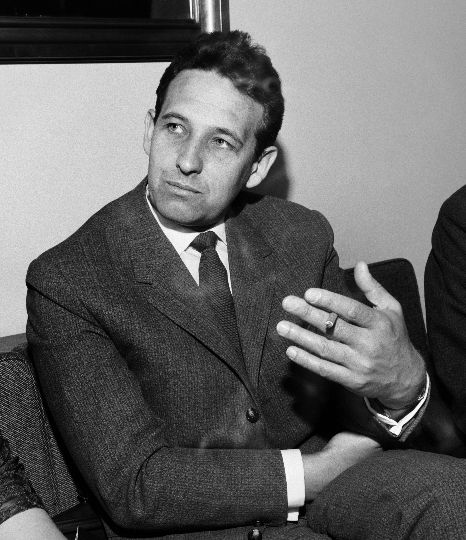
Andrzej Wajda

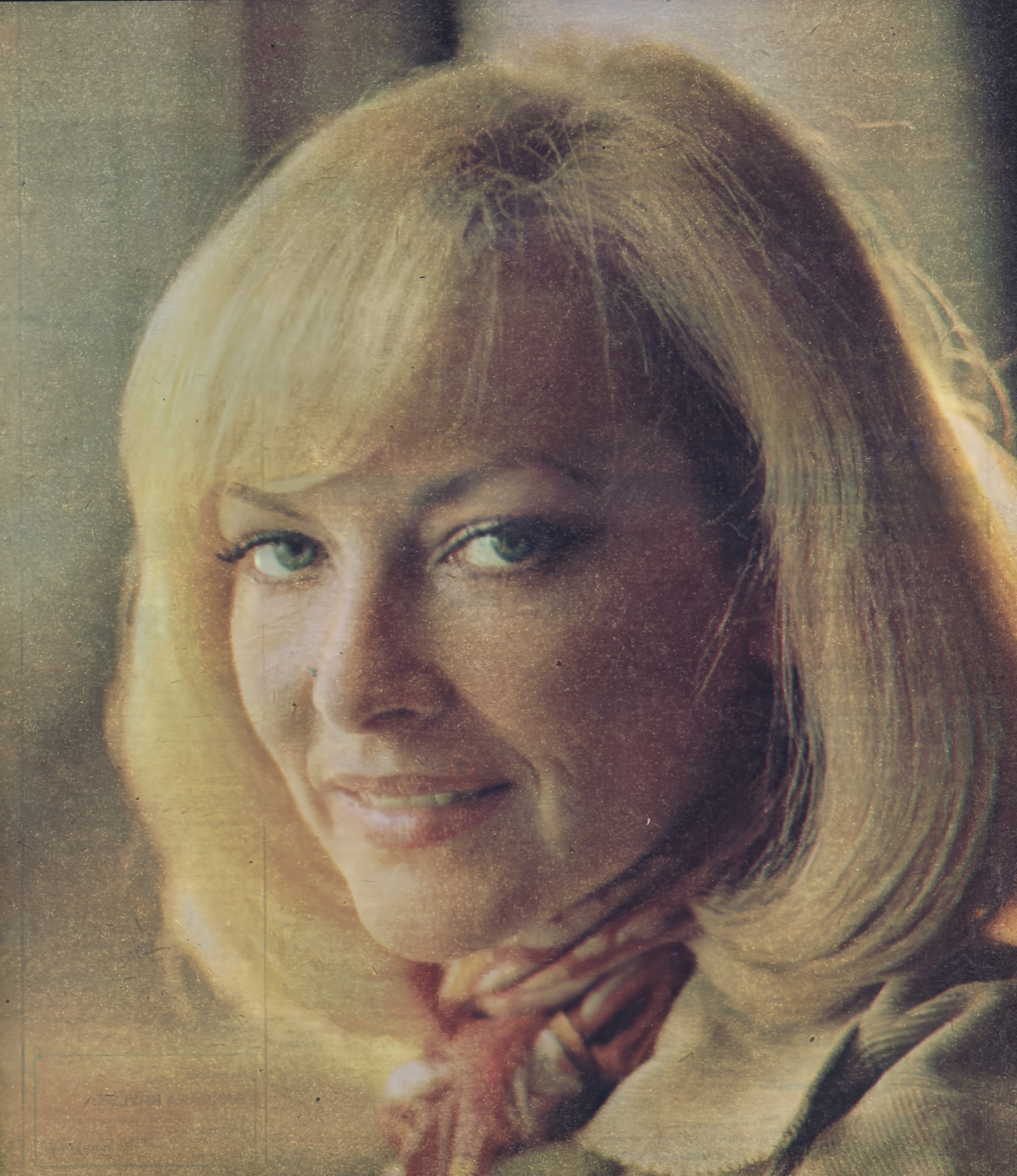
Barbara Brylska

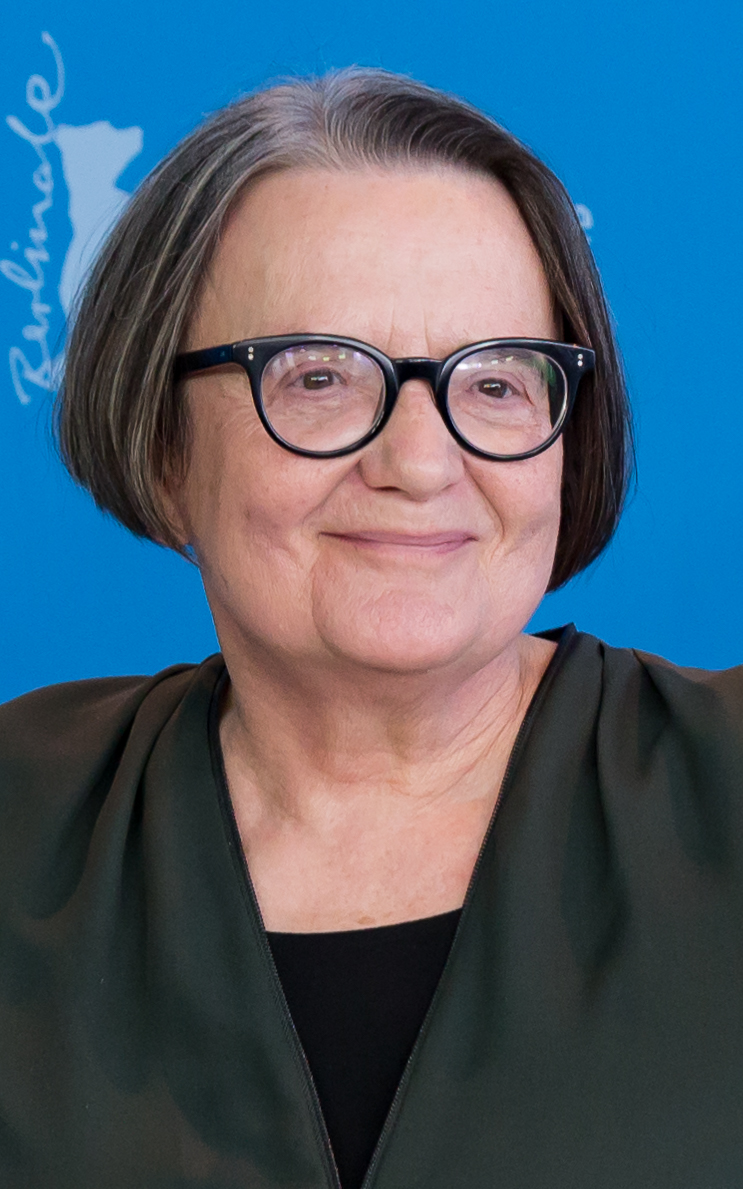
Agnieszka Holland

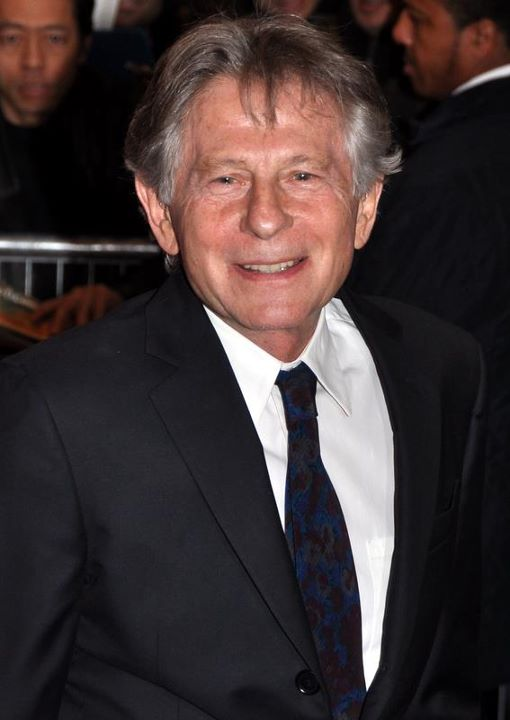
Roman Polanski

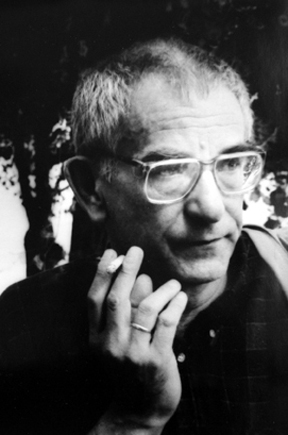
Krzysztof Kieślowski

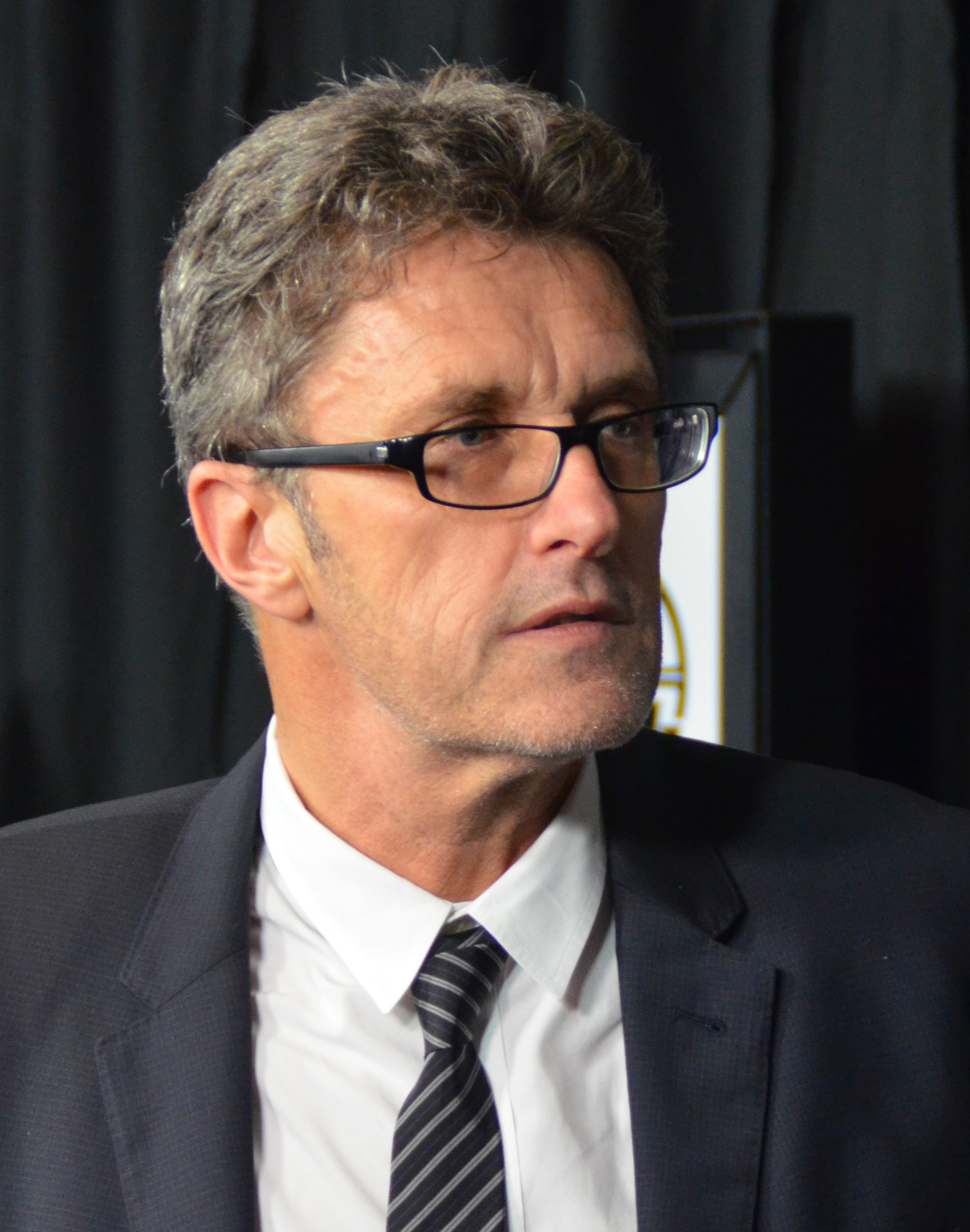
Paweł Pawlikowski

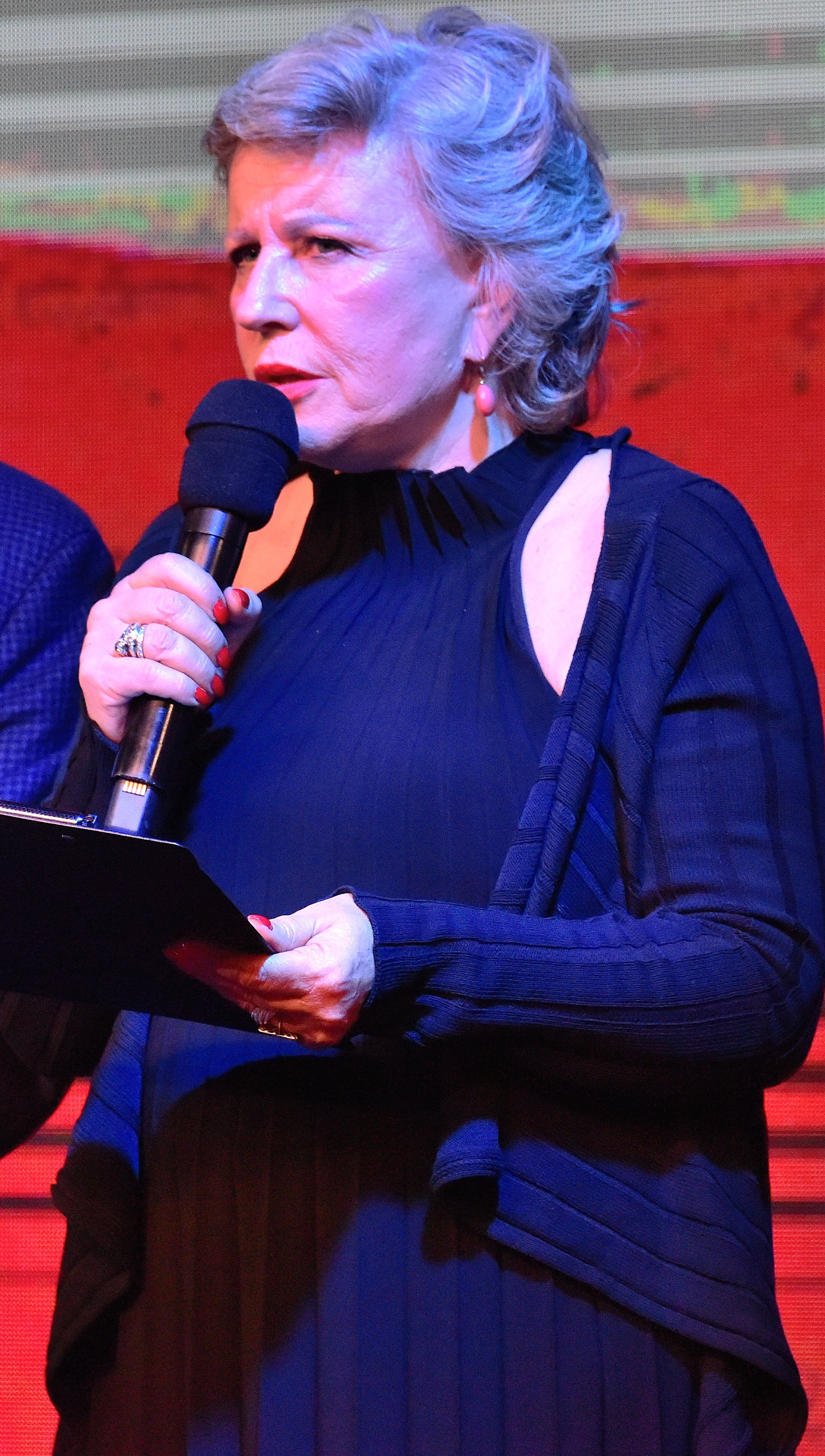
Krystyna Janda

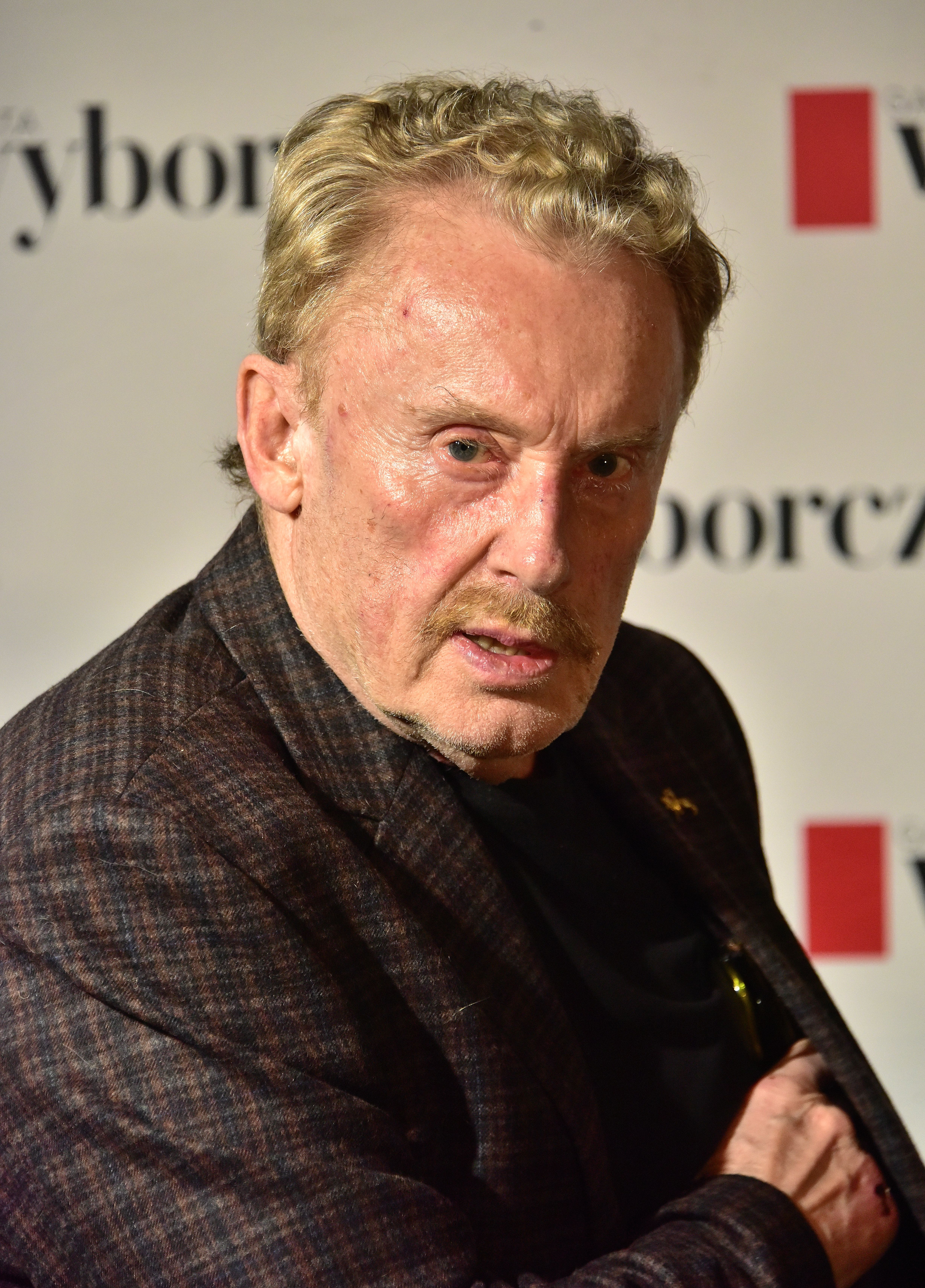
Daniel Olbrychski

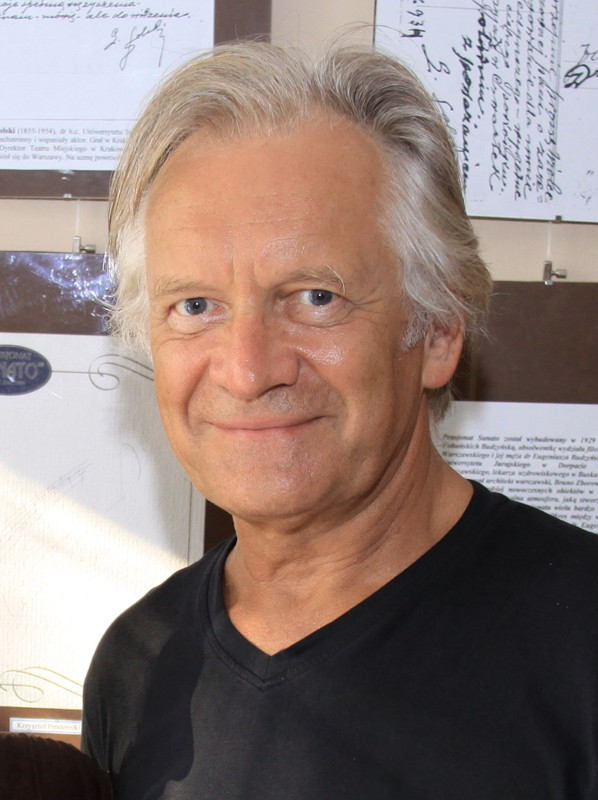
Andrzej Seweryn

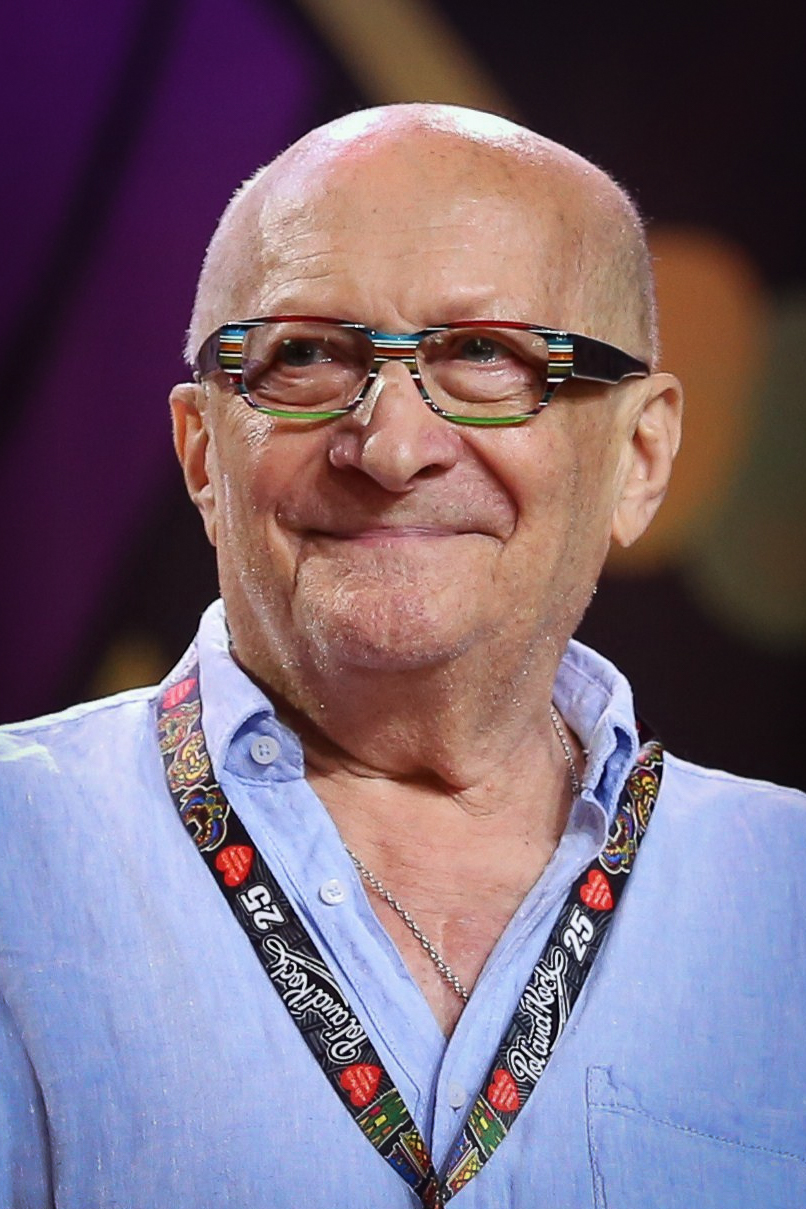
Wojciech Pszoniak

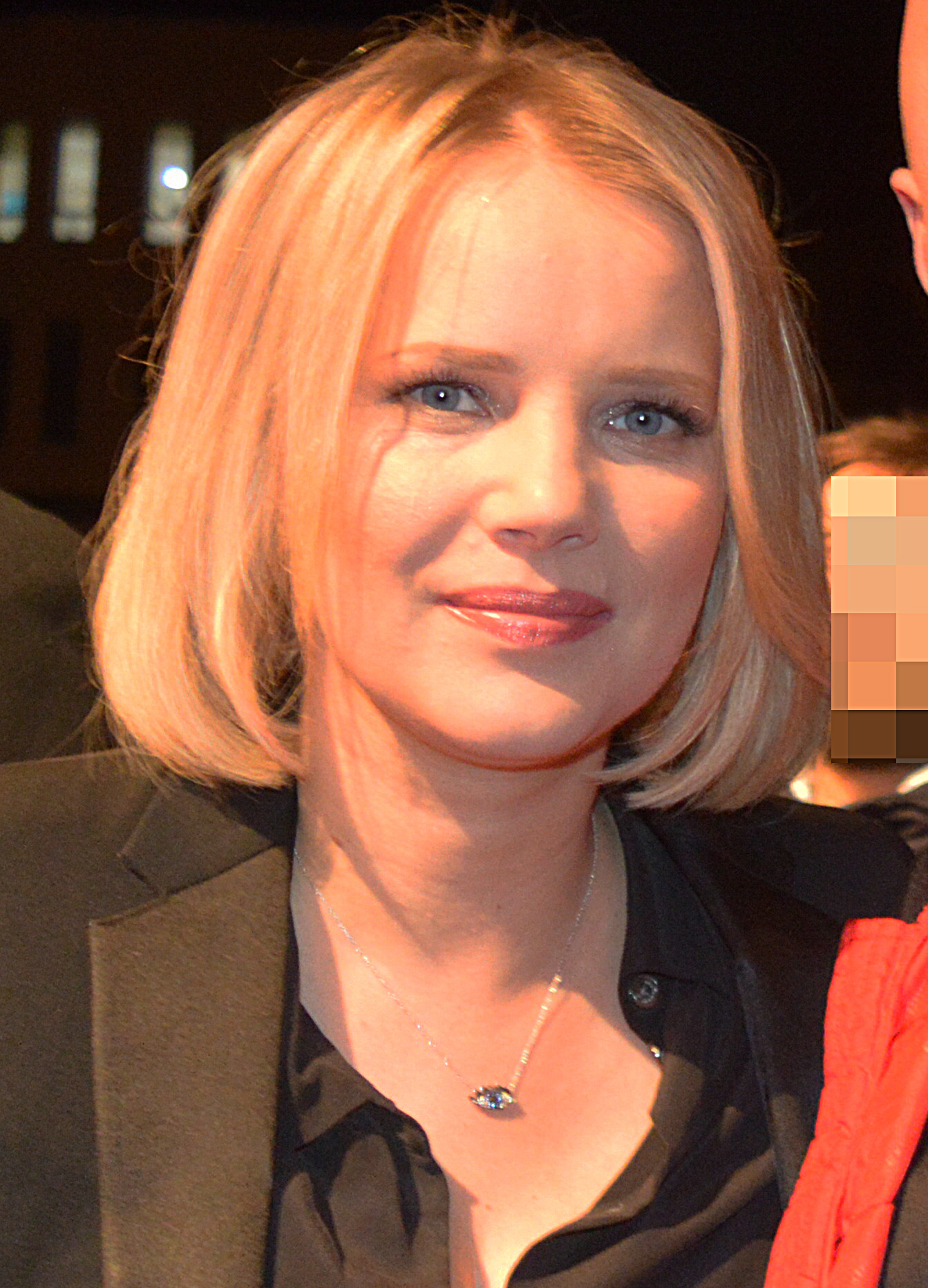
Joanna Kulig

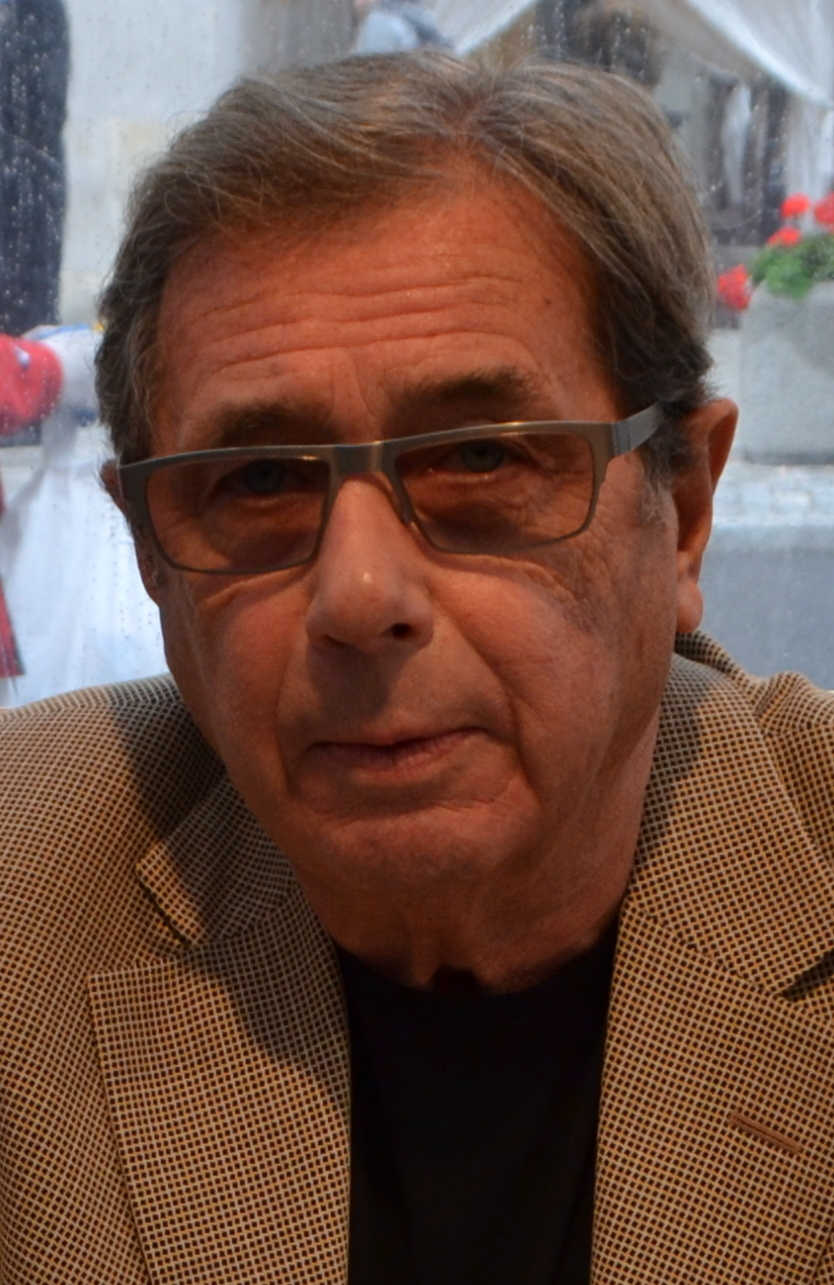
Janusz Gajos

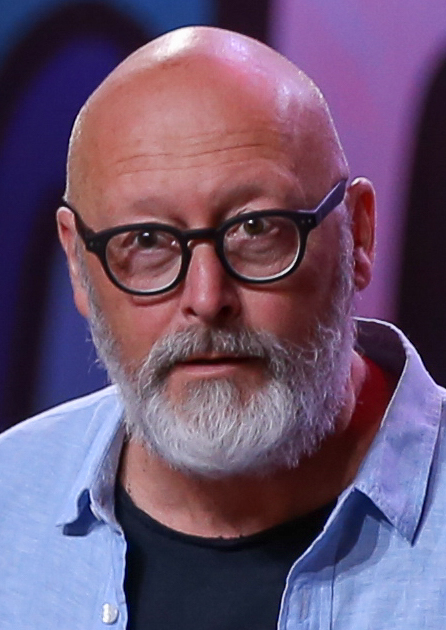
Wojciech Smarzowski

== Poland at international festivals ==
=== Venice Film Festival ===
- 1982 Grand Jury Prize (Imperative, Krzysztof Zanussi)
- 1984 Golden Lion (A Year of the Quiet Sun, Krzysztof Zanussi)
- 1993 Golden Lion (Three Colours: Blue, Krzysztof Kieślowski)
- 2010 Grand Jury Prize (Essential Killing, Jerzy Skolimowski)
- 2016 Golden Lion Honorary Award (Jerzy Skolimowski)
- 2023 Special Jury Prize (Green Border, Agnieszka Holland)

=== Locarno Festival ===
- 1971 Golden Leopard (Znaki na drodze, Andrzej Piotrowski)
- 1973 Golden Leopard (The Illumination, Krzysztof Zanussi)
- 1986 Golden Leopard (Jezioro Bodenskie, Janusz Zaorski)
- 2008 Special Jury Prize (33 Scenes from Life, Malgorzata Szumowska)
- 2016 Best Actor Award (Andrzej Seweryn, The Last Family)

=== San Sebastian International Film Festival ===
- 1958 Golden Shell for Best Film (Ewa chce spać, Tadeusz Chmielewski)
- 1967 Silver Shell for Best Director (Janusz Morgenstern, Yowita)
- 1976 Silver Shell for Best Actor (Zdzisław Kozien, Skazany)
- 1980 Golden Shell for Best Film (The Orchestra Conductor, Andrzej Wajda)
- 1985 Golden Shell for Best Film (Yesterday, Radosław Piwowarski)
- 1985 Silver Shell for Best Actor (Piotr Siwkiewicz, Yesterday)
- 1989 Silver Shell for Best Director (Mirosław Bork, Konsul)
- 1992 Silver Shell for Best Actress (Krystyna Janda, Zwolnieni z życia)

=== Cannes Film Festival ===
- 1957 Jury Prize (Kanał, Andrzej Wajda)
- 1961 Jury Prize (Mother Joan of the Angels, Jerzy Kawalerowicz)
- 1973 Jury Prize (The Hourglass Sanatorium, Wojciech Jerzy Has)
- 1978 Grand Prix (The Shout, Jerzy Skolimowski)
- 1980 Jury Prize (The Constant Factor, Krzysztof Zanussi)
- 1981 Palme d'Or (Man of Iron, Andrzej Wajda)
- 1982 Best Actress (Jadwiga Jankowska-Cieślak)
- 1988 Jury Prize (A Short Film About Killing, Krzysztof Kieślowski)
- 1990 Best Actress (Krystyna Janda)
- 1998 Cinéfondation (Jakub, Adam Guzinski)
- 2002 Palme d'Or (The Pianist, Roman Polanski)
- 2018 Best Director (Cold War, Paweł Pawlikowski)
- 2026 Best Director (Fatherland, Paweł Pawlikowski)

=== Berlin International Film Festival ===
- 1965 Silver Bear Grand Jury Prize (Repulsion, Roman Polanski)
- 1976 Silver Bear for Best Actress (Jadwiga Barańska)
- 1980 Silver Bear for Best Actor (Andrzej Seweryn)
- 1981 Silver Bear for Best Actress (Barbara Grabowska)
- 1982 Silver Bear Grand Jury Prize (Shivers, Wojciech Marczewski)
- 1994 Silver Bear for Best Director (Three Colors: White, Krzysztof Kieślowski)
- 2006 Honorary Golden Bear (Andrzej Wajda)
- 2009 Alfred Bauer Prize (Tatarak, Andrzej Wajda)
- 2010 Silver Bear for Best Director (The Ghost Writer, Roman Polański)
- 2015 Silver Bear for Best Director (Body, Malgorzata Szumowska)
- 2016 Silver Bear for Best Screenplay (United States of Love, Tomasz Wasilewski)
- 2017 Alfred Bauer Prize (Spoor, Agnieszka Holland)
- 2018 Silver Bear Grand Jury Prize (Mug, Małgorzata Szumowska)

=== Academy Awards ===
- 1942 Academy Honorary Award (Fantasia, Leopold Stokowski)
- 1954 Academy Award for Best Original Score (Lili, Bronisław Kaper)
- 1983 Academy Award for Best Animated Short Film (Tango, Zbigniew Rybczyński)
- 1994 Academy Award for Best Cinematography (Schindler's List, Janusz Kamiński)
- 1994 Academy Award for Best Production Design (Schindler's List, Allan Starski)
- 1994 Academy Award for Best Production Design (Schindler's List, Ewa Braun)
- 1999 Academy Award for Best Cinematography (Saving Private Ryan, Janusz Kamiński)
- 2000 Academy Honorary Award (Andrzej Wajda)
- 2003 Academy Award for Best Director (The Pianist, Roman Polański)
- 2005 Academy Award for Best Original Score (Finding Neverland, Jan A.P. Kaczmarek)
- 2008 Academy Award for Best Animated Short Film (Peter & the Wolf, Suzie Templeton)
- 2015 Academy Award for Best Foreign Language Film (Ida, Paweł Pawlikowski)

=== European Film Awards ===
- 1988 European Film Award for Best Film (A Short Film About Killing, Krzysztof Kieślowski)
- 1989 European Discovery of the Year (300 Miles to Heaven, Maciej Dejczer)
- 1990 European Film Academy Lifetime Achievement Award (Andrzej Wajda)
- 1991 European Film Award for Best Documentary (Hear My Cry, Maciej Drygas)
- 2002 European Film Award for Best Cinematographer (Paweł Edelman, The Pianist)
- 2006 European Film Academy Lifetime Achievement Award (Roman Polański)
- 2008 European Film Award for Best Costume Designer (Magdalena Biedrzycka, Katyń)
- 2009 European Film Award for Best Short Film (Poste restane, Marcel Łoziński)
- 2010 European Film Award for Best Short Film (Hanoi – Warsaw, Katarzyna Klimkiewicz)
- 2010 European Film Award for Best Director (Roman Polański, The Ghost Writer)
- 2010 European Film Award for Best Screenwriter (Roman Polański, The Ghost Writer)
- 2014 European Film Award for Best Film (Ida, Paweł Pawlikowski)
- 2014 European Film Award for Best Director (Paweł Pawlikowski, Ida)
- 2014 European Film Award for Best Cinematographer (Łukasz Żal and Ryszard Lenczewski, Ida)
- 2014 European Film Award for Best Screenwriter (Paweł Pawlikowski, Ida)
- 2014 People's Choice Award for Best European Film (Paweł Pawlikowski, Ida)
- 2015 European Film Award for Best Editor (Jacek Drosio, Body)
- 2016 People's Choice Award for Best European Film (Małgorzata Szumowska, Body)
- 2016 European Film Award for Best Sound Designer (Radosław Ochnio, 11 Minutes)
- 2017 European Film Award for Best Animated Feature Film (Loving Vincent, Dorota Kobiela and Hugh Welchman)
- 2017 European Film Award for Best Documentary (Communion, Anna Zamecka)
- 2017 European Film Award for Best Costume Designer (Katarzyna Lewińska, Spoor)
- 2018 European Film Award for Best Film (Cold War, Paweł Pawlikowski)
- 2018 European Film Award for Best Director (Paweł Pawlikowski, Cold War)
- 2018 European Film Award for Best Actress (Joanna Kulig, Cold War)
- 2018 European Film Award for Best Animated Feature Film (Another Day of Life, Raúl de la Fuente and Damian Nenow)
- 2018 European Film Award for Best Editor (Jarosław Kamiński, Cold War)
- 2018 European Film Award for Best Screenwriter (Paweł Pawlikowski, Cold War)
- 2018 People's Choice Award for Best European Film (Cold War, Paweł Pawlikowski)
- 2019 European Film Academy Lux Award (Cold War, Paweł Pawlikowski)
- 2022 European Film Award for Best Composer (Paweł Mykietyn, EO)

== See also ==
- Maria and Bogdan Kalinowski
- Cinema of Europe
- Cinema of the world
- History of cinema
- List of famous Poles
- List of film festivals
- List of film formats
- List of film techniques
- List of motion picture-related topics (Extensive alphabetical listing and glossary).
- List of video-related topics
- National Film School in Łódź
- New York Polish Film Festival
- Outline of film
- Piotr Zawojski
- Polish film school
- Seattle Polish Film Festival
- World cinema
- Krzysztof Kieślowski Film School
