= Eliza Orzeszkowa Memorial (Downtown, Warsaw) =

Sculpture in Warsaw, Poland

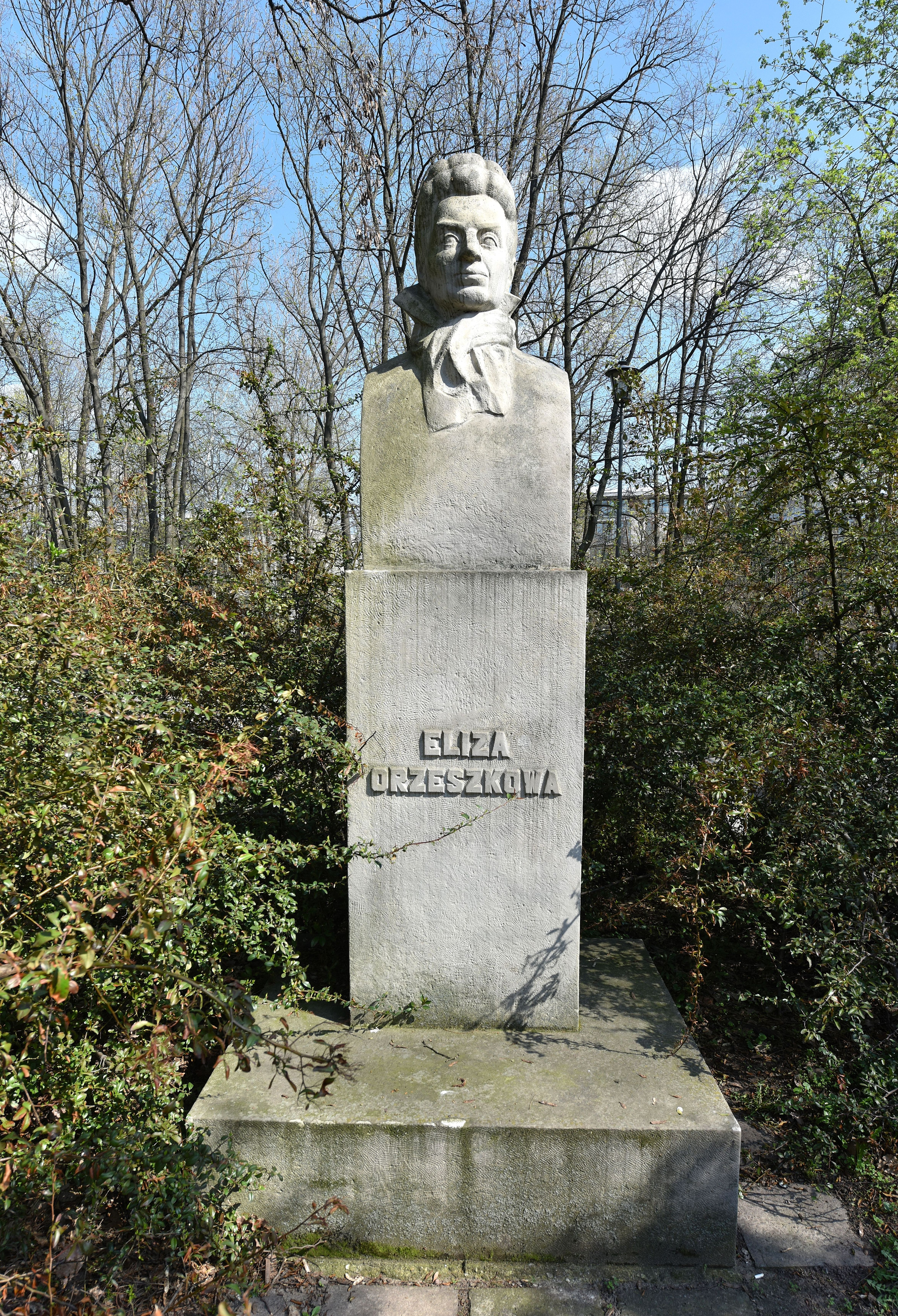
- The sculpture in 2017.
- Interactive map of Eliza Orzeszkowa Memorial
- Location: Na Książecem Park, Downtown, Warsaw, Poland
- Coordinates: 52°13′48.4″N 21°01′41.7″E
- Designer: Romuald Zerych
- Type: Bust
- Material: Sandstone
- Height: 3.4 m (11 ft)
- Opening date: January 1958
- Dedicated to: Eliza Orzeszkowa

The Eliza Orzeszkowa Memorial (Polish: Pomnik Elizy Orzeszkowej) is a sandstone sculpture in Warsaw, Poland, located in Na Książecem Park, next to Książeca Street, within the South Downtown neighbourhood. It depicts bust of Eliza Orzeszkowa, a 19-century writer and novelist. The sculpture was designed by Romuald Zerych, and unveiled in January 1958.

== History ==
The monument dedicated to Eliza Orzeszkowa, a 19-century writer and novelist, was designed by Romuald Zerych, and unveiled in January 1958 in Na Książecem Park. It is a copy of author's sculpture from Grodno, Belarus. It was commissioned by the presidium of the National Council of the Capital City of Warsaw.

== Characteristics ==
The sandstone monument consists of a bust of Eliza Orzeszkowa, placed on a pedestal. It is located in the Na Książecem Park, next to a pond at Książeca Street. It has the height of 3.4 m.
