= Gloria Victis =

Gloria Victis may refer to:

- Gloria Victis (sculpture), by Antonin Mercié
- Gloria Victis (novella), by Eliza Orzeszkowa
- Gloria Victis Memorial, Budapest, Hungary memorial
- Gloria Victis (Confederate monument), or Fame, a Confederate monument in Salisbury, North Carolina
