= Eliza Orzeszkowa =

Polish novelist (1841–1910)

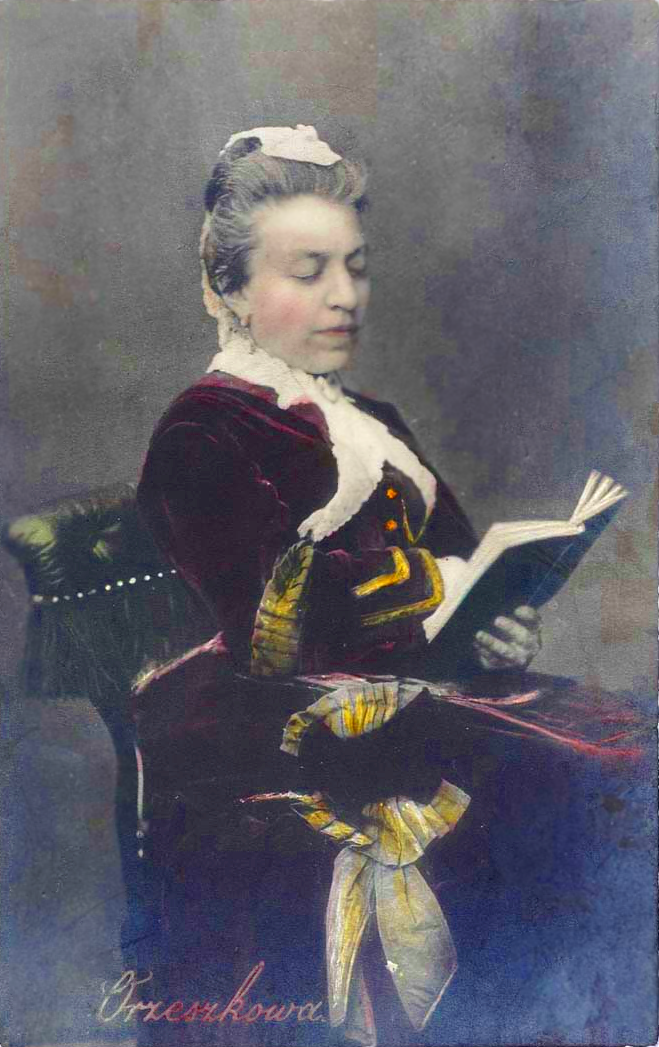
- Born: Eliza Pawłowska; 6 June 1841; Miĺkaŭščyna, Russian Empire (now Belarus)
- Died: 18 May 1910 (aged 68); Grodno, Russian Empire (now Belarus)
- Occupations: Novelist, essayist, publisher
- Spouse(s): Piotr Orzeszko; Stanisław Nahorski
- Writing career
- Notable works: Meir Ezofowicz, Nad Niemnem, Cham, Bene nati

Signature
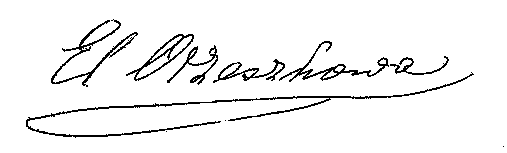

Eliza Orzeszkowa (6 June 1841 – 18 May 1910) was a Polish novelist and a leading writer of the Positivism movement during the foreign Partitions of Poland. In 1905, together with Henryk Sienkiewicz, she was nominated for the Nobel Prize in Literature.

== Life and career ==
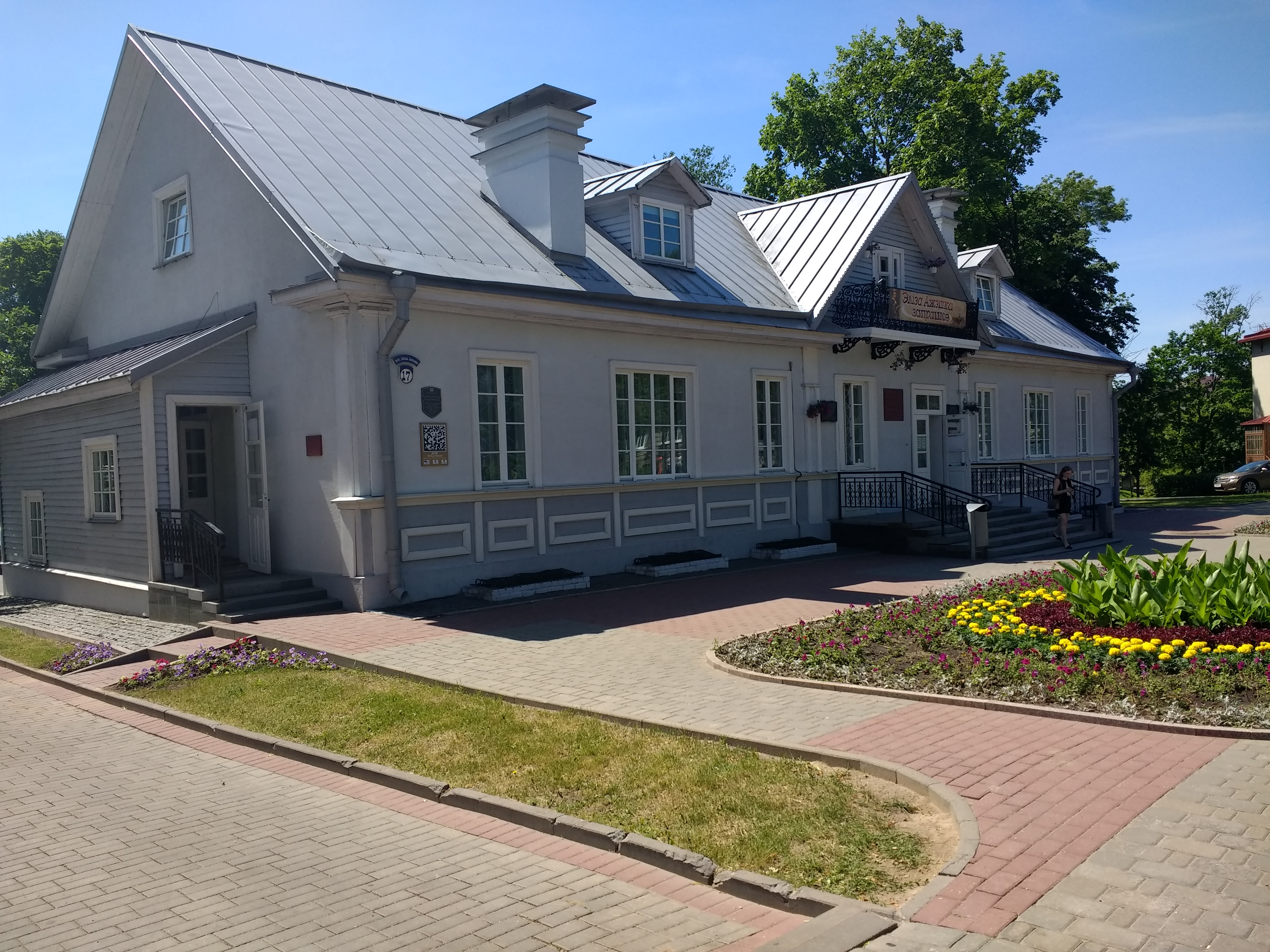
House of Eliza Orzeszkowa in Grodno, currently a museum

She was born as Eliza Pawłowska at an estate in Milkowszczyzna (then in the Russian Empire, now Miĺkaŭščyna in Belarus) to the noble Polish–Lithuanian Pawłowski family, and died in Grodno (now in Belarus) nearby. From 1852 to 1857, she lived in Warsaw, where she attended school. There she met another future Polish writer Maria Konopnicka. After returning to Milkowszczyzna, at the age of sixteen, Eliza married Piotr Orzeszko, a Polish nobleman twice her own age, who was exiled to Siberia after the January Uprising of 1863. They were legally separated in 1869. She married again in 1894, after a 30-year-long relationship with Stanisław Nahorski, who died a few years later. In 1866, she moved to Grodno and turned novelist.

Orzeszkowa wrote a series of 30 novels and 120 powerful sketches, dramas and novellas, dealing with the social conditions of her occupied country. Her novel Eli Makower (1875) describes the relations between the Jews and the Polish nobility; and Meir Ezofowicz (1878), the conflict between Jewish orthodoxy and modern liberalism. In 1888 Orzeszkowa wrote two novels about the Niemen River (now part of Belarus): Cham (The Boor) focused on the life of fishermen; and her most famous novel, Nad Niemnem (On the Niemen)—often compared to Pan Tadeusz—dealing with the issues of Polish aristocracy against the backdrop of political and social order. Her study on patriotism and cosmopolitanism appeared in 1880. A uniform edition of her works was published in Warsaw between 1884 and 1888. Much of her output is available also in German translation.

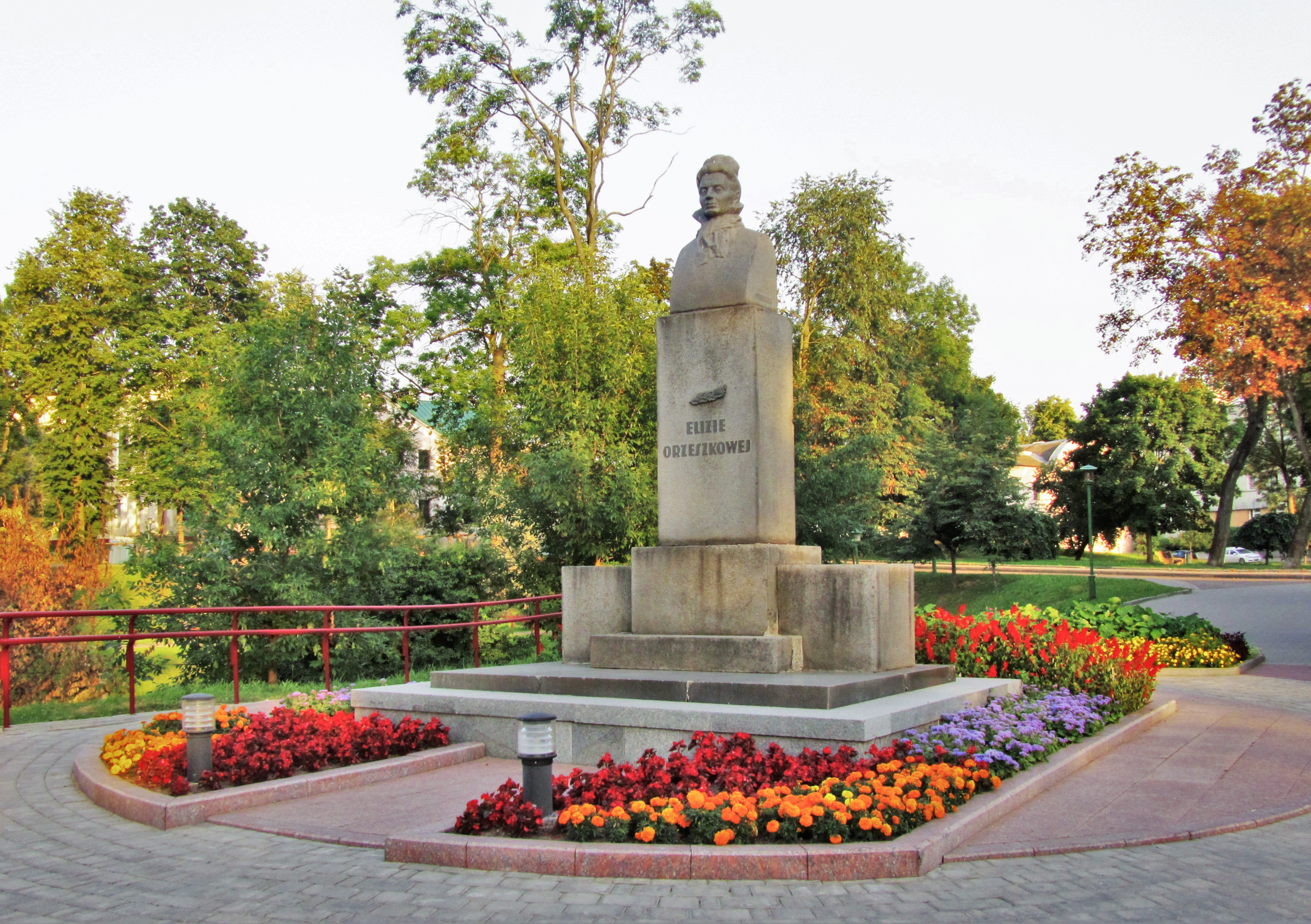
Monument to Eliza Orzeszkowa in Grodno, Belarus

In 1905, together with Henryk Sienkiewicz and Leo Tolstoy, Orzeszkowa was nominated for the Nobel Prize in Literature. The prize was awarded to Sienkiewicz. According to official records of the Nobel Prize committee, the idea of dividing the prize was rejected as an act of disparagement, and only the latter ended up as the laureate.

== Remembrance ==
In 1929, the statue of Orzeszkowa was unveiled in Grodno (present-day Belarus). In 1938, Eliza Orzeszkowa's bust designed by Henryk Kuna was unveiled in Warsaw's Praski Park.

In 1978, a biographical film titled Ty pójdziesz górą... devoted to Orzeszkowa was directed by Zygmunt Skonieczny with Hanna Maria Giza portraying the novelist. The film was part of a cycle of films Figures of Polish literature and premiered in 1980.

In 2023, during the 12th edition of the National Reading Day, her book Nad Niemnem was read in numerous public places. The President of Poland Andrzej Duda as well as the First Lady of Poland Agata Kornhauser-Duda took part in the campaign.

== Selected works ==
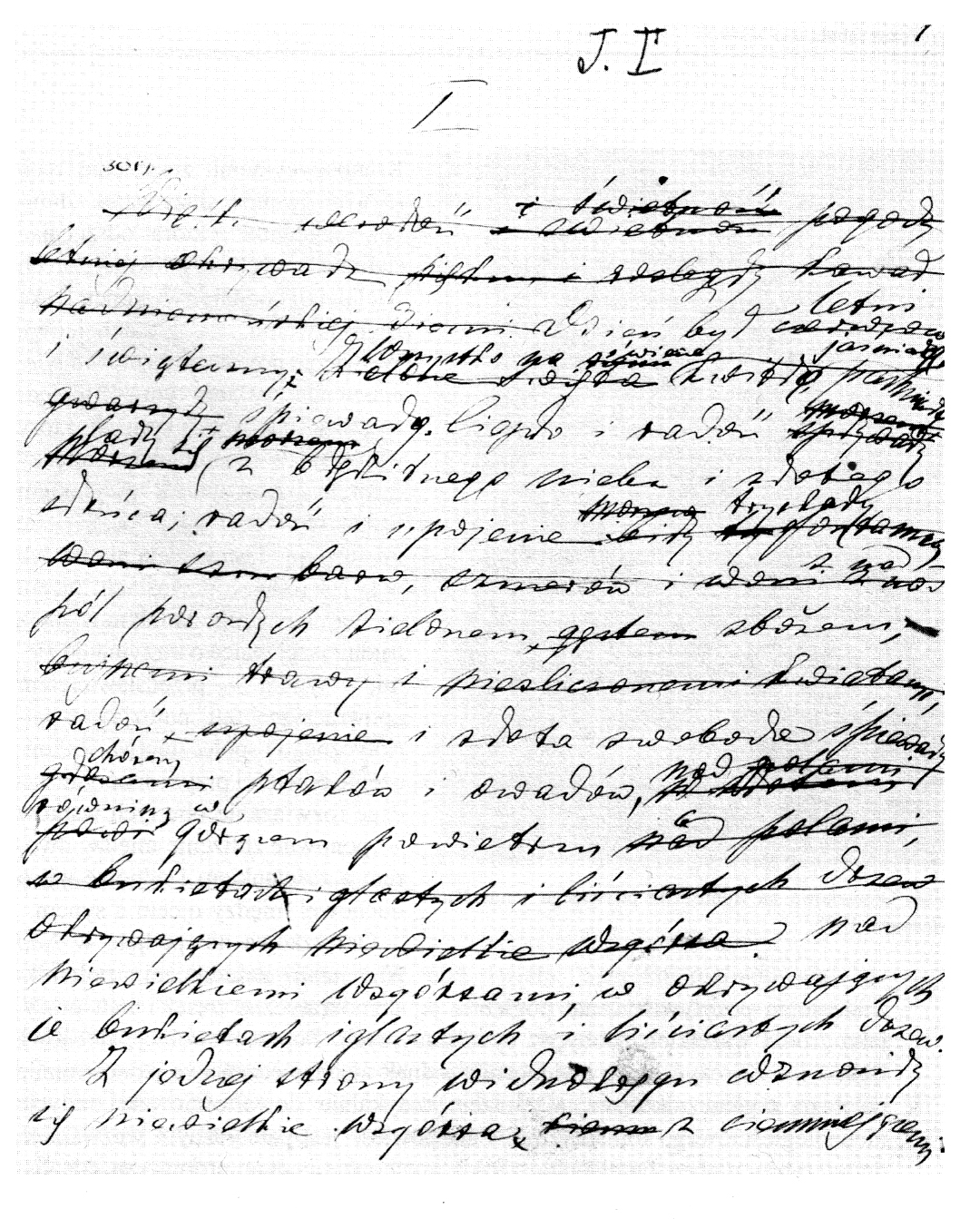
Manuscript of the novel Nad Niemnem

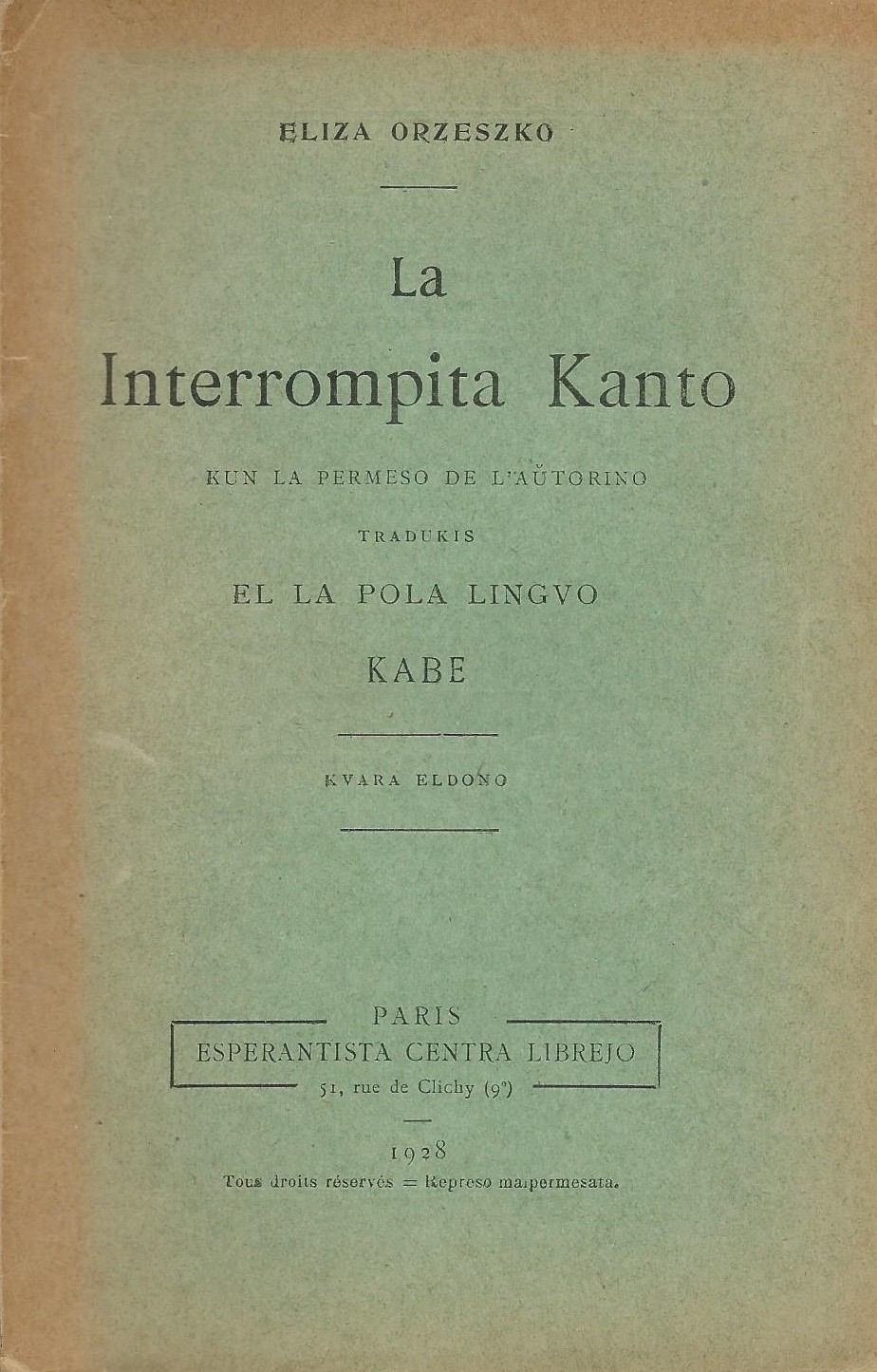
Work of Orzeszkowa translated in Esperanto.

- Obrazek z lat głodowych 1866
- Z życia realisty, 1868
- Na prowincji, 1870
- Pamiętnik Wacławy, 1871
- Marta, 1873
- Rodzina Brochwiczów, 1876
- Pompalińscy, 1876
- Meir Ezofowicz, 1878
- Z różnych sfer, 1879–1882
- Widma, 1881
- Sylwek Cmentarnik, 1881
- Zygmunt Ławicz i jego koledzy, 1881
- Niziny, 1885
- Dziurdziowie, 1885
- Nad Niemnem (On the Niemen), 1888
- Cham (The Boor), 1888
- Panna Antonina (collection of novels), 1888
- W zimowy wieczór (collection of novels), 1888
- Melancholicy, 1896
- Australczyk, 1896
- Iskry (collection of novels), 1898
- Argonauci (The Argonauts), 1900
- Gloria victis (collection of novellas), 1910

Journalism for social justice

- Kilka słów o kobietach (On women), 1870
- Patriotyzm i kosmopolityzm, 1880
- O Żydach i kwestii żydowskiej, 1882
