= Nad Niemnem (film) =

1987 film by Zbigniew Kuźmiński

Nad Niemnem is a 1987 Polish historical film that follows the aftermath of the January Uprising. It is about the lives of the families that lived on twenty years later, showing how the return to the classed society divided those families who once had fought as brothers. This return to the old classed society, resulted in a sense of betrayal on one side and guilty indignation on the other. This, until the niece of an estate owner befriends a neighboring family. The neighbors who had lost their noble status still maintained a large tract of land which they farmed successfully themselves. While her own uncle is on the verge of losing his estate because his brother in law is calling in an old loan of money. The brother in law wants to spend the money on a big dowry and grand piano for his daughter. The niece understands the financial position. Her own father lost his estate and they both live with the uncle. The niece finds more happiness in her new friendship with her neighbors than with those of her own class. She begins to spend all her time next door learning to do the chores of a peasant farmer's wife. This is unlike her aunt who spends her days reclining on a couch acting the grand lady. The aunt is completely incapable of understanding how close she is to losing her couch. From her couch, the aunt entertains a wealthy suitor who is connected to the family. But the niece declines the offer of marriage from this suitor. The suitor is also a very sedate morphine addict but he is a noble. Her family can not understand what she could be thinking to reject such an advantageous offer. Until she marries the handsome peasant farmer next door. The family grudgingly at first admit it is a very good match after all. This alliance heals the breach between peasant and noble. The old promises of solidarity between the neighbors are reaffirmed. The ancestors resting in their graves overlooking the Niemnem are at peace. Although they died fighting in the January Uprising the real battle was against the classed society. A victory postponed and finally won,"Nad Niemnem". Nad Niemnem, based on the novel of the same name. It was released in 1987.

== Cast ==
- Iwona Katarzyna Pawlak – Justyna Orzelska
- Adam Marjański – Jan Bohatyrowicz
- Marta Lipińska – Emilia Korczyńska
- Janusz Zakrzeński – Benedykt Korczyński
- Jacek Chmielnik – Zygmunt Korczyński
- Bożena Rogalska – Marta Korczyńska
- Michał Pawlicki – Bohatyrowicz Anzelm
- Zbigniew Bogdański – Orzelski
- Edmund Fetting – Darzecki
- Ewa Wencel – Klotylda Korczyńska
- Eugeniusz Wałaszek – rządca majątku Korczyńskich
- Andrzej Szaciłło – Starzyński
- Magdalena Scholl – Antolka Bohatyrowiczówna
