= Seattle Polish Film Festival =

The Seattle Polish Film Festival (SPFF) is an annual film festival, held in Seattle, Washington, showcasing current and past films of Polish cinema. It is produced by the Seattle-Gdynia Sister City Association and awards the Seattle Spirit of Polish Cinema awards as well as the Viewers Choice of Best Film.

The first edition of the SPFF was held in 1992. The 17th edition of the festival was held from April 10, 2009 through April 19, 2009. Members of the Jury included Brian Jones, PSG Films; Zbyszek Pietrzyk, SPFF; and Lance Rhoades from Seattle Film Institute and University of Washington. Viewers Choice Award at the 17th Seattle Polish Film Festival was presented to director Magdalena Piekorz for "Drowsiness" (Senność). The Seattle Spirit of Polish Cinema award for Best Drama was given to director Kasia Adamik for "Offsiders" (Boisko bezdomnych). Best Comedy award went to Tomasz Konecki for "A Perfect Guy For My Girl" (Idealny facet dla mojej dziewczyny), and the Best Short Film award was given to filmmaker Maciej Prykowski for his "What Nobody Knows" (Czego nikt nie wie).

== See also ==
- Cinema of Poland
- List of famous Poles
- List of film festivals
- List of motion picture-related topics (Extensive alphabetical listing and glossary).
- National Film School in Łódź
- New York Polish Film Festival
- Outline of film
- Polish film school
