= Warszawskie Towarzystwo Łyżwiarskie =

Warsaw ice skating society

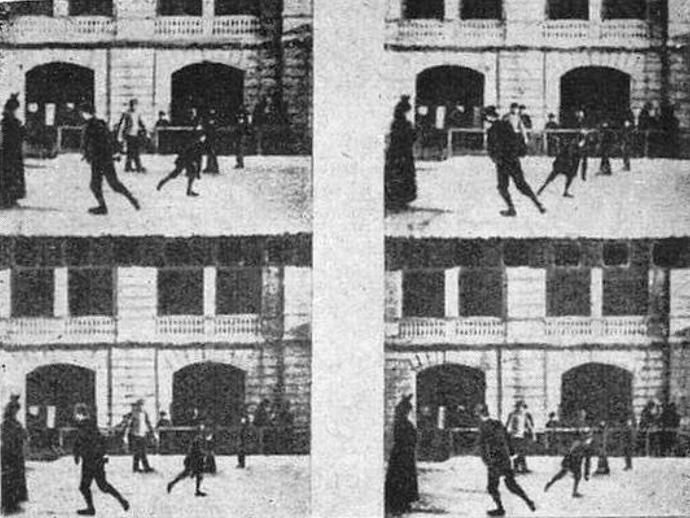
Four preserved frames of the first Polish film Ślizgawka w Łazienkach shot by Kazimierz Prószyński in Warsaw in the years 1894–1896.

Warszawskie Towarzystwo Łyżwiarskie (WTŁ) was an ice skating society based in Warsaw founded in 1893. It existed until 1939.

== History ==
Its activity was initially focused around the ice rink on a freezing pond in the middle of the cycling track in Dynasy, but later it was inextricably associated with Swiss Valley at Ul. Chopin. In 1898, WTŁ became a member of the International Skating Union (ISU), thus introducing Polish skating to organized international structures. It also promoted other sports disciplines, including: gymnastics, fencing, tennis, and roller skating.

In the years 1894–1896, the members of the society were immortalized in the first ever Polish film made by the inventor and director Kazimierz Prószyński, who recorded a skating rink in Warsaw where they regularly practiced skating.

WTŁ conducted lively socio-cultural, patriotic, and social activities. The WTŁ premises were one of the most elegant salons in Warsaw. Before 1914, conspiratorial activities were carried out in the WT area.

In the years 1905–1908, the vice president, and in 1908, the president of the Warsaw Skating Society was Adolf Daab, an industrialist and councilor of Warsaw.

== Bibliography ==
- Encyklopedia Warszawy, Wydawnictwo Naukowe PWN, Warsaw 1994, p. 935
