= New York Polish Film Festival =

- Location: New York City
- Founded: 2005
- Awards: Krzysztof Kieślowski Beyond Borders Award; Elżbieta Czyżewska Award; New York's Audience Award
- Producers: Hanna Kosińska-Hartowicz
- Website: http://www.nypff.com

New York Polish Film Festival (abbreviated to NYPFF, Polish: Nowojorski Festiwal Filmów Polskich) is a film festival held annually in New York City since 2005. Its mission is to present and promote Polish cinema in the United States, to expose an American audience to Polish films, as well as to offer Polish filmmakers a rare opportunity to showcase their works in a major cultural center such as New York. Each year the festival presents acclaimed selections of features, short films, animations and documentaries of Polish filmmakers regardless of the country where films were made. NYPFF is the only annual presentation of Polish films in New York City and the largest festival promoting and presenting Polish films on the East Coast.

== Awards ==
The film festival's jury grants the "Beyond Borders Award," named in honor of Krzysztof Kieślowski, for the best feature, documentary and short films (only Polish productions and US premieres at the festival are qualified to compete). The audience votes for their choice of the best Polish films and the winners in each category are presented with the "New York’s Audience Award." In 2011, in memory of Elżbieta Czyżewska, an award for best actress was introduced.

== See also ==
- Cinema of Poland
- List of famous Poles
- List of film festivals
- List of motion picture-related topics (Extensive alphabetical listing and glossary).
- National Film School in Łódź
- Outline of film
- Polish film school
- Seattle Polish Film Festival
