= Skating Rink in the Royal Baths =

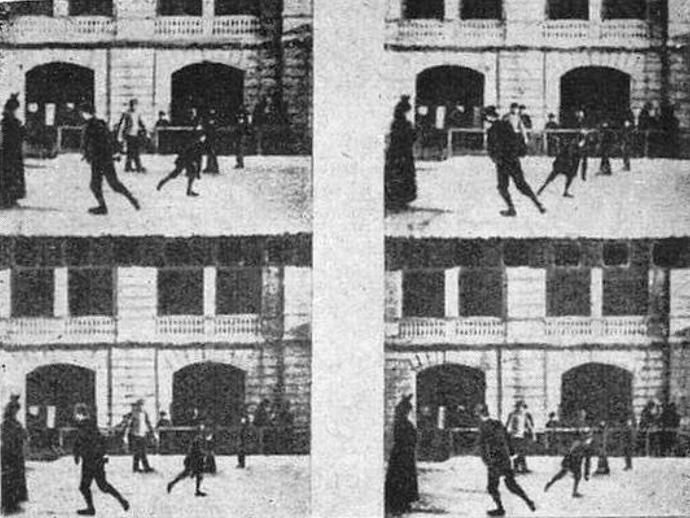
- Four preserved frames of Ślizgawka w Łazienkach, reproduced in the Polish press
- Directed by: Kazimierz Prószyński
- Release date: 1902
- Country: Kingdom of Poland

Skating Rink in the Royal Baths (Polish: Ślizgawka w Łazienkach, also known as Na ślizgawce, lit. 'At the ice rink')) is probably the first film in the history of Polish cinematography, shot by Kazimierz Prószyński in Warsaw between 1894 and 1896. The film shows skaters on the skating rink of the Warsaw Skating Society.

Animation made from preserved film frames

== History ==
The date of the film's creation is not precisely known. The film is either missing or has been destroyed. However, descriptions from the Polish press documenting the first film screenings in Poland organized by Kazimierz Prószyński and four film frames reproduced in the Warsaw press have survived.

The film was probably made between 1894 and 1896, as indicated by the six holes perforation between the frames and not, as was later accepted, along the film. This was a characteristic feature of films made by Prószyński with the first version of the cinematographic apparatus called pleograph. Prószyński made a number of improvements and major design changes. In 1896, he modernized the pleograph, adapting it to world standards.

The frame format was also non-standard. It measured 45×38 mm and was larger than those later used in the film.
