= Nad Niemnem =

1888 novel by Eliza Orzeszkowa

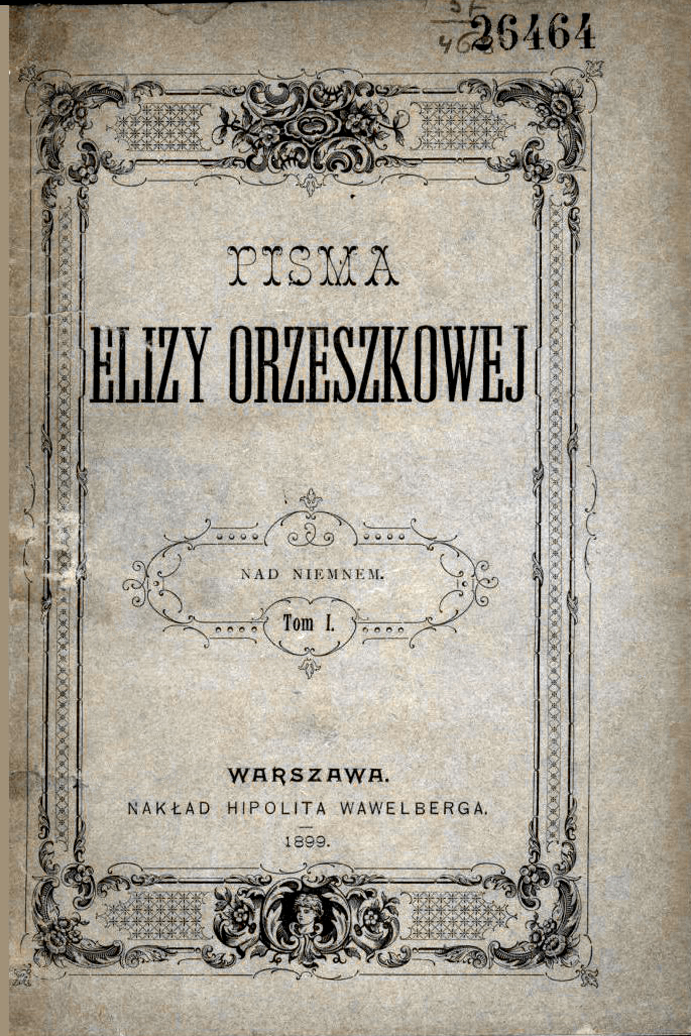
- Title page, 1899
- Author: Eliza Orzeszkowa
- Translator: Michelle Granas
- Language: Polish
- Genre: novel
- Publisher: Gebethner and Wolff
- Publication date: 1888
- Publication place: Russian Empire
- Pages: 400

Nad Niemnem is a Positivist novel written by Eliza Orzeszkowa in 1888 during the foreign Partitions of Poland. Its main purpose was to present the Polish society and its own internal dynamics as they were in mid–19th century, in reference to the Polish January Uprising against the Russian occupation. The novel first appeared in installments on the pages of Tygodnik Ilustrowany in 1887 and was published as a book in 1888. In 2014 it was translated into English as On the Niemen by Michelle Granas.

First the author planned to limit the plot to a love story between Jan, a villager from the petty nobility, and Justyna, who comes from a wealthy landed gentry family. However, while writing, the background relating to customs started to develop which made Orzeszkowa give up the original title: Misalliance.

Nad Niemnem is set in and around the city of Grodno after the 1863 January Uprising. At the time, the area had a considerable Polish population. The title means "Upon the Niemen" – the Niemen being a river now situated in modern Belarus and Lithuania.

From May 2024, an autograph copy of the novel is presented at a permanent exhibition in the Palace of the Commonwealth in Warsaw.

== Main characters ==
- Justyna Orzelska: the main character of the narrative, an everywoman who has experienced downward social mobility with a failure for a father and a dead mother. She relies on her uncle, Benedykt, for a place to live, and is supplicant to him in all things, but ends up developing a deep relationship with the Bohatryowicz family without his knowledge. Zygmunt, Różyc, and Janek all pursue her throughout the novel.
- Bohatyrowicz family (Anzelm, Janek, Fabian): their lifestyle is elegant, not to say festive, very seldom coarse. Many proverbs, sayings, rhymes and aphorisms are present in their speech. The Bohatyrowicz family cultivates also the folk-songs which contrasts with the traditions of the Korczyński family which lives in the manor house, where folk-singing seems to be inappropriate. The other cultural heritage they cherish is a sense of social order regulated by the specific customs, gestures and the type of interaction with neighbours. They avoid formalism and stiffening of behaviour. Their religiousness is based on obeying the Ten Commandments rather than God-fearing practices. (Orzeszkowa did not put the emphasis on Polish Catholicism and deprived her fictitious village of a priest).
- Benedykt Korczyński: his characteristic feature is bitterness (caused by the adversities of fate, choices between evil and evil, fight for patrimony with the occupant etc.) and loneliness. He fenced himself off from the Bohatyrowiczes because they were the first to bring an action against him, that was the reason of their mutual dislike. The only person he can rely on is Marta.
- Marta Korczyńska: truly the woman of the house, although a servant. She represents a woman of firm moral convictions, who is oafish and not at all graceful, but who raised Witold as her own son. Without her and Benedykt, the estate would have fallen into ruin. She feels unloved, just as Benedykt feels alone, but the two support the world together.
- Witold Korczyński: an univocally positive hero; Witold symbolises young people who draw conclusions from the past and believe in the rebirth of the nation. At the same time he is a colourless and conventional character. In all the conflicts with his father he is always the one that is right, however this culminates in Benedykt's awakening, where the feelings of his youth rush back to him. He too once dreamed like Witold, but he lost his brother in the January Uprising, so decades later he learned to bury those ideals with Witold's uncle. By the end of the book, the conflict brings father and son together again.
- Emilia Korczyńska: a disappointed wife who longs for an overwhelming passion, whether through the love she no longer feels for Benedykt, or escaping through fantasies about Egyptians or Eskimos through books read aloud to her. Usually of poor health and bedridden, she is described as narcissistic and cultured.
- Zygmunt Korczyński: spoiled cousin and foil of Witold. Zygmunt was raised away from the common world and never had to labor or speak to uncultured people. His mother was obsessed with him being special and raised him up to be a painter, a career in which he showed promise once, but never realized it fully. Bored with the world, a womanizer and generally immoral.
- Remaining characters: Teofil Różyc, Andrzejowa Korczyńska, Bolesław Kirło, Maria Kirłowa, Jadwiga Domuntówna.

== Motifs appearing in the novel ==
- January uprising – introduced to the novel through the motif of a common mound of 40 insurgents situated in the middle of the forest. The area belongs to the Korczyński family. The insurgents are strongly idealised, there is no pondering of the rebels’ mistakes or questions concerning the peasantry’s attitude towards the uprising. Emilia Korczyńska, Teresa Pilińska, Bolesław Kirło, Ignacy Orzelski, Deneccy, Teofil Różyc are the people that have no interest in the tomb because they do not commemorate the memory of people who died there. Son of one of the insurgents, Zygmunt Korczyński, is even audacious enough to ridicule them during the conversation with his mother, declaring his father, Andrzej, to have been a madman to take part in the uprising.
- Misalliance – introduced to the work mainly through the legend of Jan and Cecylia . That particular misalliance was “blessed” by the national authority. The marriage of Jan and Justyna is the repetition of the mythical model. The third misalliance appearing in the book is the marriage of Witold and Marynia Kirło, the fourth – marriage of Andrzejowa Korczyńska and the last one – marriage of Ładyś Bohatyrowicz with a peasant woman.
- The lack of books in the novel. There are almost no books mentioned in the work, only Anzelm keeps three books: Pan Tadeusz, David's Psalter and Ogrody Północne. Those are copies that he received from Andrzej Korczyński a couple years earlier. Selection of those three titles has a great didactic function for the readers.

== Adaptations ==
The novel has been adapted twice for film, in 1939 and again in 1986. The 1986 film led to a 1988 television miniseries.

== See also ==
- Polish literature
- Nad Niemnem (film)

== Notes and references ==
- Analysis of the book (in Polish)
