= Maria and Bogdan Kalinowski =

Polish filmgoers

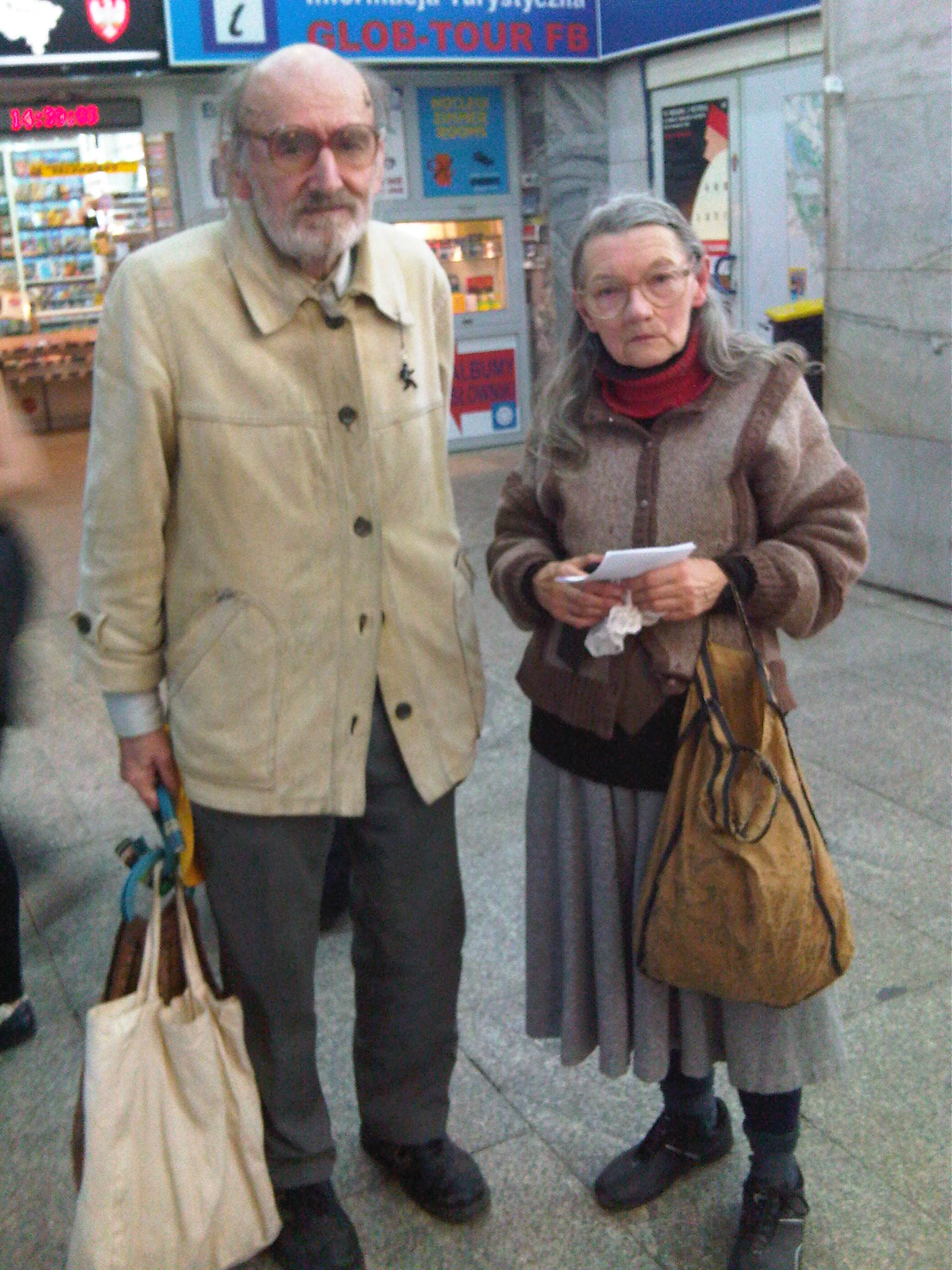
Maria and Bogdan Kalinowski in June 2012

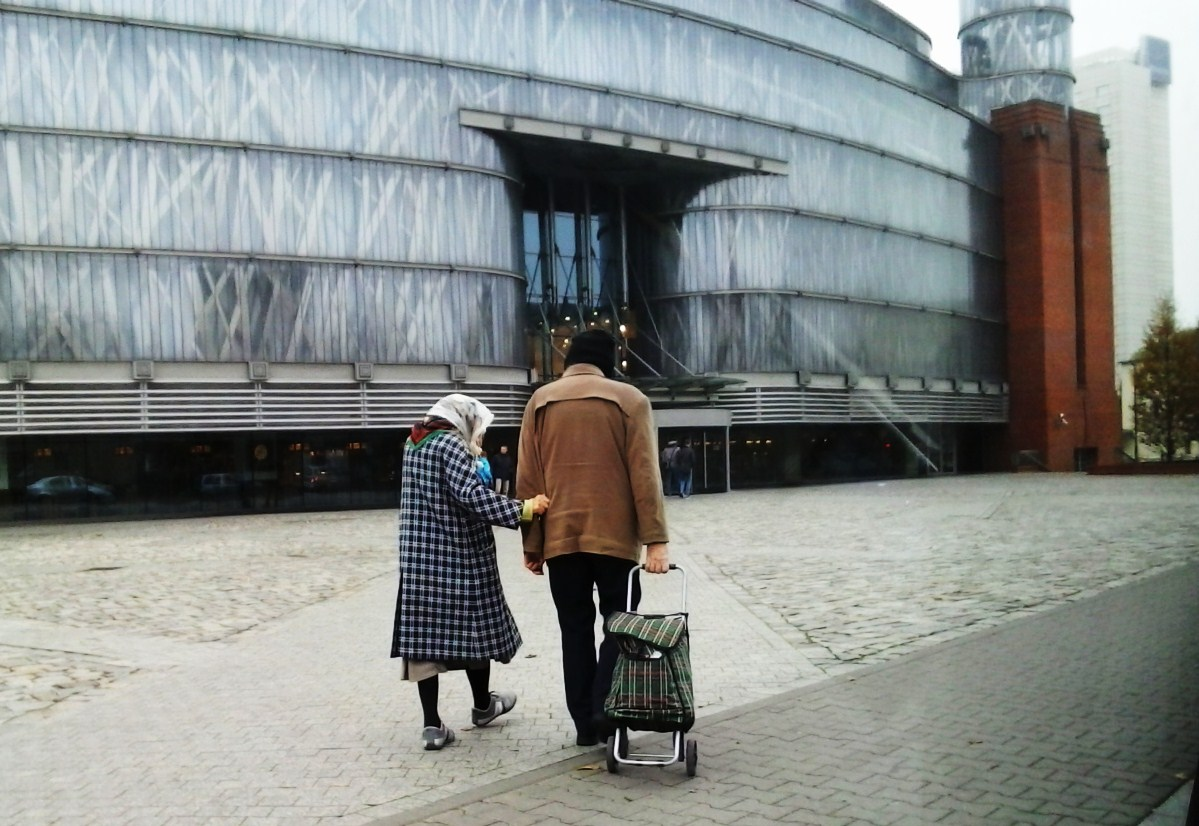
On their way to a cinema (November 2014)

Maria Makowska-Kalinowska (1945 – 14 November 2020) and Bogdan Kalinowski (1939 – 9 November 2017) were a married couple from Poznań, Poland, known as the most avid filmgoers in Poland. They watched films in cinemas of Poznań regularly from 1973 on. In 2010 alone they watched 563 films. Altogether, between 1973 and 2010 they had viewed over 11,000 films together; by mid-2015 the total exceeded 13,000.

== Biography ==
The couple met in 1973 during a library course. They married 13 years later, in 1986. Both spent most of their lives working in school libraries in Poznań before retiring. As the couple had to leave the flat they occupied, in 2010 they received a small flat above the Muza cinema from the city of Poznań. The refurbishment of the flat was financed through public fundraising and through not-for-profit screenings of various films in the Muza cinema.

The first film they watched together was King, Queen, Knave by Jerzy Skolimowski in April 1973. For Maria it was the 1,798th film in her moviegoers' career: the first she noted in her notebook was a Soviet comedy A Girl with Guitar from 1958.

Bogdan started to keep a record of films watched. In 2008 they recorded their 10,000th entry; after the movie finished, the cinema held a small ceremony to commemorate this event.

Bogdan died in November 2017; Maria died in November 2020.

== Recognition ==
The couple's passion for movies was a subject of numerous documentary films, including Rekord absolutny ("Absolute Record", 1998) and Jeden dzień bliżej kina ("One Day Closer to the Cinema", 2002). In 2006, to commemorate the 110th anniversary of the Lumière brothers' invention, the mayor of Poznań, Ryszard Grobelny sent the Kalinowskis a congratulatory letter. In 2008 they received a special prize at the Prowincjonalia film festival. They were honored guests at numerous Polish film festivals, and received free passes for many Polish cinemas.

== See also ==
- The Moviegoer
