= Gloria Victis (novella) =

1910 novella by Eliza Orzeszkowa

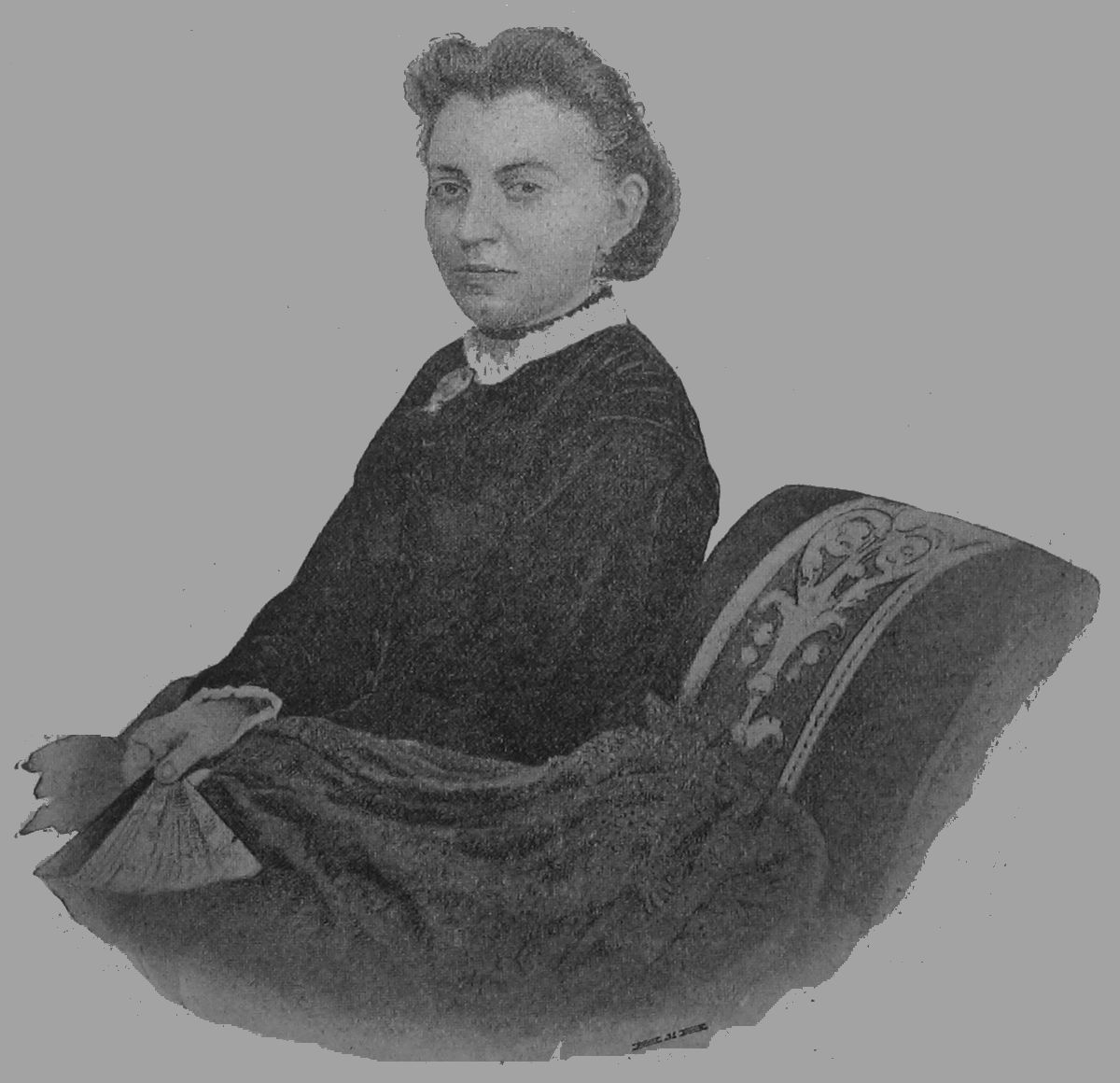

Gloria Victis is a short story written by Eliza Orzeszkowa, a Polish novelist and a leading writer of the Positivism in Poland. Gloria Victis was published in 1910 in a book of short stories with the same title, as one of the stories in the collection.

== Historical background ==
The year in which the story was written – 1908 – was the 45th anniversary of the Polish January Uprising against the Russian Empire. Therefore, Gloria Victis is perceived as a tribute to the fallen and to all the people who fought for independent Poland. Because of the revolution in Russia and the cease of censorship resulting from it, Orzeszkowa was able to write Gloria Victis without using superfluous metaphors, so that it could be easily understood.

== Summary ==
The story, which tackles the problem of the January Uprising, is narrated by nature (wind, trees and flowers). It all begins with wind, which after 100 years of travelling around the world came to see his old friends at a glade by the forest. When he reached them, they told him that he missed an important event. When he heard that, he started strolling around the place. He felt the smell of blood and heard the echoes of the killed. After that he asked his friends about the reason of all this and they told him about the uprising. One day a division of insurgents arrived at the glade and set a camp there. They were young people who were proud to fight for their homeland. The leader of the division was Romuald Traugutt – a heroic Polish general who was executed for actions connected with the retrieving of Polish independence. The trees liked few of the insurgents and the biggest attention was given to Maryś and Jagmin. Maryś lived nearby and was known to the trees. He had a sister – Anielka and Jagmin was his friend. Before the uprising Jagmin and Anielka became very close to each other and the day when the boys decided to join the uprising was one of the saddest in the life of Anielka. The battles began and the insurgents were winning. Their victory didn't last long and the camp was finally attacked by the Russians. The insurgents were fighting hard, but the enemy was too strong. Maryś and Jagmin died. The first one because of the wound he received, the second one because he got shot when trying to help Maryś. This place was forgotten by everyone and only once the mass grave was visited. It was Anielka who came to see the place where her loved ones died and after a short visit she left the glade never to return. The wind was weeping for almost all the story, but when the flowers finished the story it left the glade screaming – "Gloria victis!".

== The Title ==
"Gloria victis" is a phrase strictly connected with the plot and means "Glory to the vanquished". It is the opposite of the Latin phrase "Vae victis" – "woe to the vanquished".
