= Hanna Maria Giza =

Polish radio journalist and actress

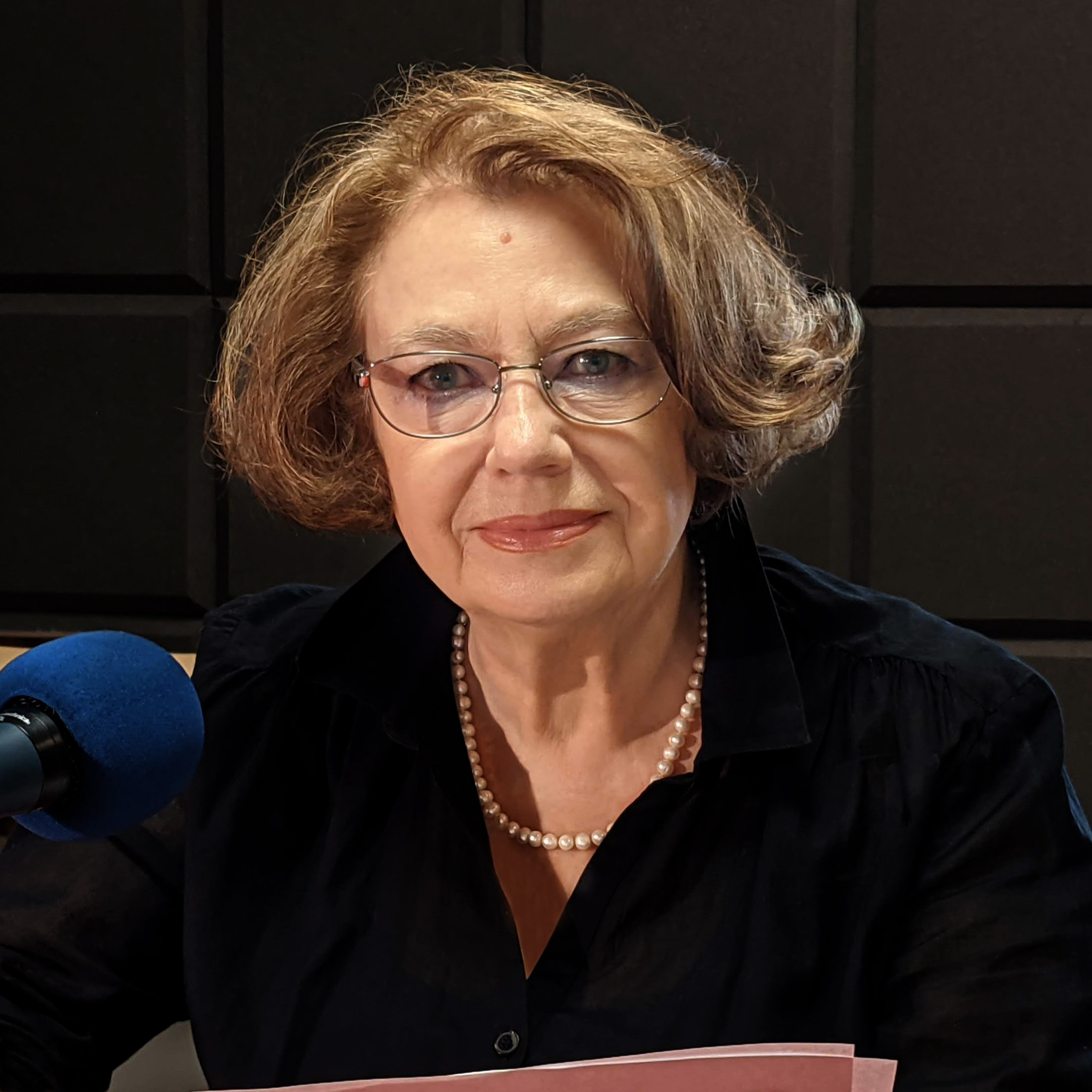
Hanna Maria Giza, 2021

Hanna Maria Giza (born 1948) is a Polish radio journalist, film and stage actress, author of adaptations and director of radio plays, recipient of multiple state and professional awards and decorations.

== Books ==
- Wywiady z mistrzami fotografii (seres Artyści mówią, Rosikon Press, Izabelin-Warszawa 2011)
- Święty Ojciec. 80. urodziny Jana Pawła II (Biały Kruk, Kraków 2000)
- Święty Ojciec. Zwierzenia papieskiego fotografa Arturo Mari (Biały Kruk, Kraków 2000)
- W obiektywie. Mistrzowie fotografii polskiej. Rozmowy Hanny Marii Gizy (Rosikon Press, Izabelin-Warszawa 2005)
- Ostatnie lato w Maisons-Laffitte. Jerzy Giedroyc, Zofia Hertz, Henryk Giedroyc. Sierpień 2000 r. - listopad 2001 r. (Kolegium Europy Wschodniej, Wrocław 2007)

== Awards and decorations ==
- 2000: Silver Cross of Merit
- 2005: Silver Gloria Artis Medal for Merit to Culture
- 2005: Gold Cross of Merit
- 2006: Golden Microphone
- 2011: Knight's Cross of the Order of Polonia Restituta
