= Daniel Albert Naurits =

Estonian figure skater

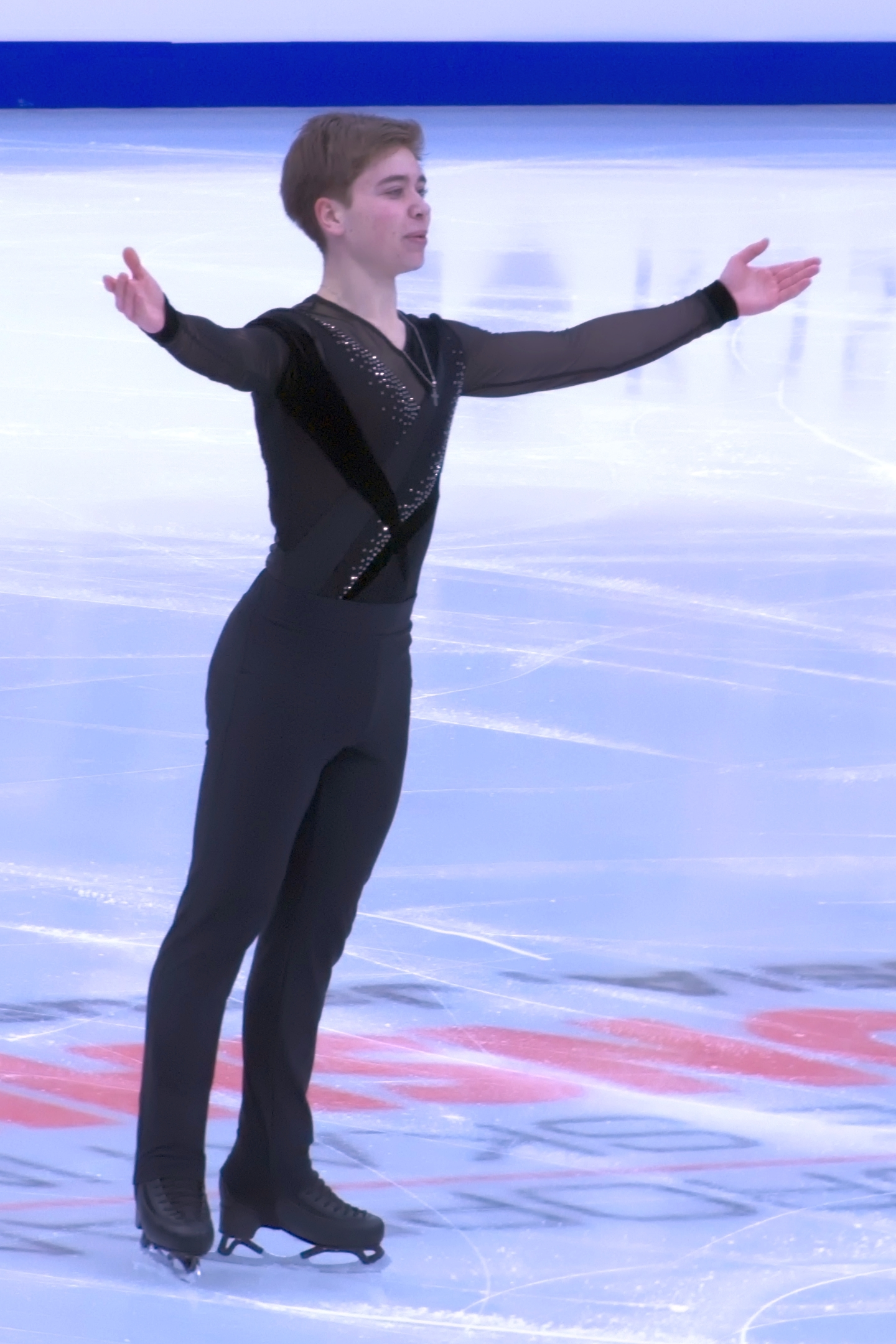
- Daniel Albert Naurits at the 2018 European Championships

Personal information
- Born: 22 March 1998 (age 28) Tallinn, Estonia
- Height: 1.77 m (5 ft 9 1/2 in)

Figure skating career
- Country: Estonia (2011–13, 2016–20); France (2014–16)
- Discipline: Men's singles
- Began skating: 2001

Medal record
Representing Estonia
Estonian Championships
| Gold medal – first place | 2017 Tallinn | Singles |
| Gold medal – first place | 2018 Tallinn | Singles |
| Silver medal – second place | 2019 Tallinn | Singles |
| Bronze medal – third place | 2013 Tallinn | Singles |
| Bronze medal – third place | 2020 Tallinn | Singles |

Daniel Albert Naurits (born 22 March 1998) is an Estonian figure skater. He is the 2017 Nordic bronze medalist and a two-time Estonian national champion. He has competed in the final segment at three ISU Championships.

== Career ==
=== Early years in Estonia ===
Naurits began learning to skate in 2001. Early in his career, he represented Estonia, coached by Irina Kononova in Tallinn. His ISU Junior Grand Prix (JGP) came in October 2011. In March 2012, he competed at the World Junior Championships in Minsk, Belarus, but did not advance to the free skate. The Warsaw Cup in November 2012 was his final competition representing Estonia for four years.

=== Switch to France ===
Naurits debuted internationally for France in April 2014 at the Triglav Trophy, where he won the junior silver medal. In the 2014–2015 season, he competed at two JGP events, placing 8th in Tallinn and 10th in Courchevel, France. He placed 7th competing on the senior level at the French Championships and later took the bronze medal at the French Junior Championships.

Naurits made his final international appearance for France in early October 2015, placing 13th at a JGP event in Logroño, Spain. He placed 6th as a senior at the French Championships in December 2015. During his time in France, he trained under Katia Gentelet in Nice.

=== Return to Estonia ===
In the 2016–2017 season, Naurits was coached by Anna Levandi in Tallinn. He made his senior international debut and his return to representing Estonia in October 2016 at the Finlandia Trophy, a Challenger Series (CS) event at which he finished 14th. He won the Estonian national senior title in December 2016 and the junior title in January 2017.

In January, Naurits competed at the 2017 European Championships in Ostrava, Czech Republic. Ranked 24th in the short program, he obtained the final qualifying spot and then placed 20th in the free skate, resulting in a final placement of 22nd. He also qualified to the free skate at the 2017 World Junior Championships, finishing 20th in Taipei, Taiwan.

Coached by Liina-Grete Lilender, Naurits placed 21st at the 2018 European Championships in Moscow, Russia.

== Programs ==
| Season | Short program | Free skating |
|---|---|---|
| 2018–2019 | La identidad inaccesible by Alberto Iglesias choreo. by Natalja Janovskaja | Smile; Liquid Spirit by Gregory Porter choreo. by Natalja Janovskaja |
| 2017–2018 | Nocturne No. 20 (from The Pianist) by Frédéric Chopin choreo. by Benoît Richaud | W.E. by Abel Korzeniowski choreo. by Benoît Richaud |
| 2016–2017 | Charms (from W.E.) by Abel Korzeniowski | Requiem by Wolfgang Amadeus Mozart |
| 2015–2016 | The Pianist by Frédéric Chopin, Wojciech Kilar | Mozart in Egypt |
| 2014–2015 | The Admiral by Ruslan Muratov, Gleb Matveychuk | Inception by Hans Zimmer |
| 2012–2013 | Hit the Road Jack by Ray Charles | Sherlock Holmes by Hans Zimmer |
| 2011–2012 | Notre-Dame de Paris by Riccardo Cocciante | Shadowboxing by Aleksei Shelygin |

== Competitive highlights ==
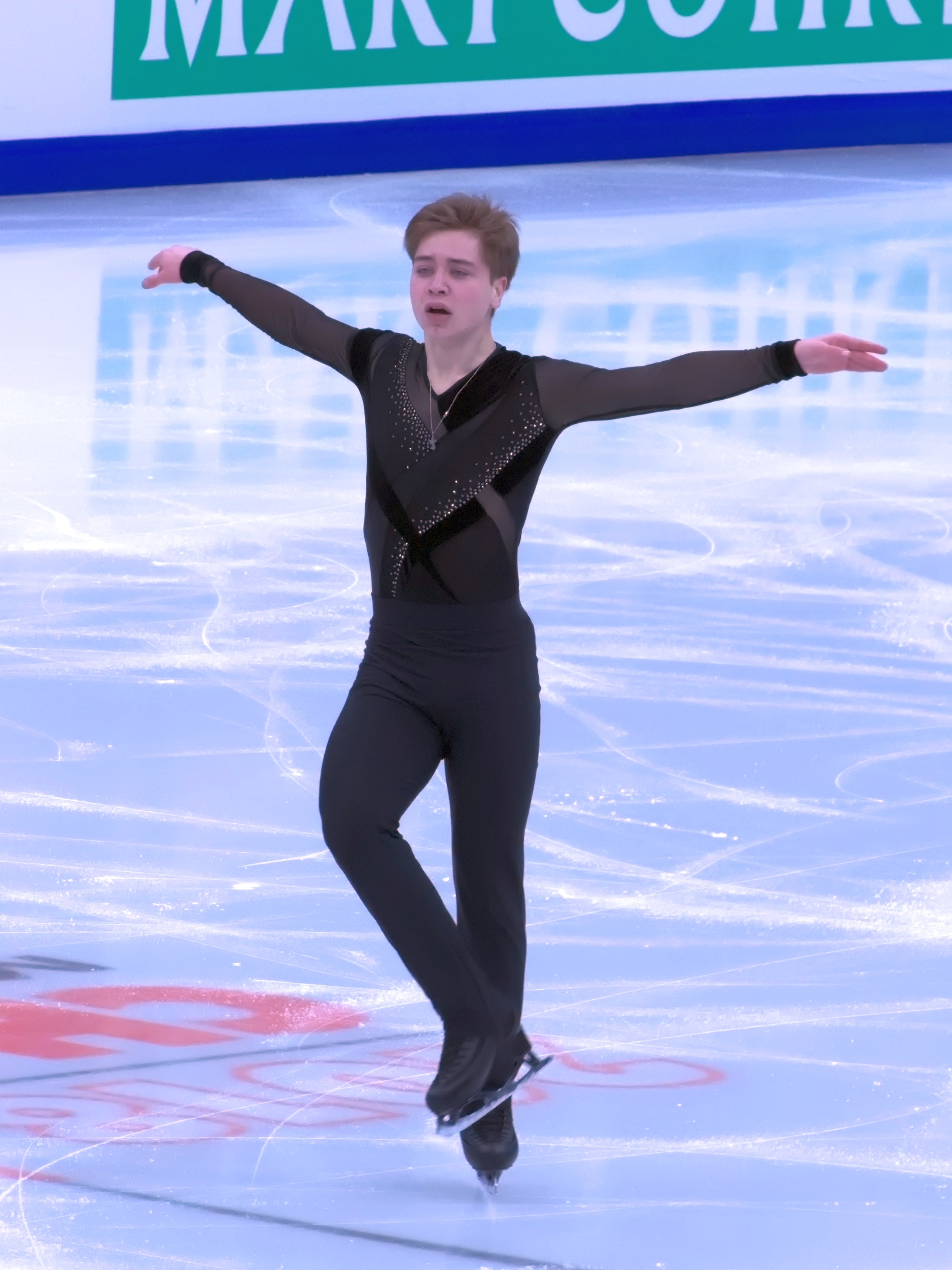
Naurits at the 2018 Euros

CS: Challenger Series; JGP: Junior Grand Prix

International
| Event | 11–12 (EST) | 12–13 (EST) | 13–14 (FRA) | 14–15 (FRA) | 15–16 (FRA) | 16–17 (EST) | 17–18 (EST) | 18–19 (EST) | 19–20 (EST) |
|---|---|---|---|---|---|---|---|---|---|
| Europeans | | | | | | 22nd | 21st | | |
| CS Alpen Trophy | | | | | | | | 17th | |
| CS Finlandia | | | | | | 14th | 18th | 16th | |
| CS Golden Spin | | | | | | | | | 10th |
| CS Tallinn Trophy | | | | | | 14th | 10th | 13th | |
| CS Warsaw Cup | | | | | | | | | 8th |
| Denis Ten Memorial | | | | | | | | | 3rd |
| Golden Bear | | | | | | 10th | | | |
| Ice Star | | | | | | | | 6th | |
| Jégvirág Cup | | | | | | | 1st | | |
| Nordics | | | | | | 3rd | 4th | 5th | |
| Tallink Hotels Cup | | | | | | | | 3rd | |
| Universiade | | | | | | | | 12th | |
| Volvo Open Cup | | | | | | | 4th | | 4th |
International: Junior
| Junior Worlds | 29th | | | | | 20th | | | |
| JGP Estonia | 17th | | | 8th | | | | | |
| JGP France | | | | 10th | | | | | |
| JGP Germany | | 16th | | | | | | | |
| JGP Spain | | | | | 13th | | | | |
| Bavarian Open | | | | 3rd | | | | | |
| Cup of Nice | | | | 4th | | | | | |
| Ice Star | | 5th | | | | | | | |
| Tallinn Trophy | | 2nd | | | | | | | |
| Triglav Trophy | | | 2nd | | | | | | |
| Volvo Open Cup | | | | 3rd | | 2nd | | | |
| Warsaw Cup | | 8th | | | | | | | |
National
| Estonian Champ. | | 3rd | | | | 1st | 1st | 2nd | 3rd |
| Estonian Junior | 2nd J | | | | 1st J | 1st J | | | |
| French Champ. | | | | 7th | 6th | | | | |
| French Junior | | | 6th | 3rd | | | | | |
| Masters | | | | 4th J | 4th J | | | | |
