= Schindler's List (soundtrack) =

1993 film score by John Williams

Schindler's List: Original Motion Picture Soundtrack

Film score by John Williams
- Released: 1994
- Recorded: September – October 1993
- Studios: Sony Pictures Studios, Los Angeles, CA; Symphony Hall, Boston, MA
- Genre: Soundtrack
- Length: 64:35
- Label: MCA
- Producer: John Williams

John Williams chronology
Jurassic Park (1993)	Schindler's List: Original Motion Picture Soundtrack (1994)	Sabrina (1995)

Professional ratings
Review scores
Source	Rating
Allmusic	link
Entertainment Weekly	A− link
FilmTracks	link
SoundtrackNet	link

Schindler's List: Original Motion Picture Soundtrack is the score album for Steven Spielberg's 1993 film of the same name. Composed and conducted by John Williams and performed by the Hollywood Studio Symphony, the original score features violinist Itzhak Perlman.

The album won the Academy Award for Best Original Score, the BAFTA Award for Best Film Music, and the Grammy Award for Best Score Soundtrack for Visual Media. It also received a Golden Globe Award nomination for Best Original Score.

Theme from Schindler's List is one of the most recognized contemporary film scores, particularly the violin solo. Many high-level figure skaters have used this in their programs, including Katarina Witt, Irina Slutskaya, Anton Shulepov, Yuna Shiraiwa, Paul Wylie, Johnny Weir, Tatiana Navka, Roman Sadovsky, Satoko Miyahara, Nicole Schott, Jason Brown and Yulia Lipnitskaya.

== Track listing ==
All music is composed by John Williams.

Schindler's List (Original Motion Picture Soundtrack)
No.	Title	Length
1.	"Theme from Schindler's List"	4:14
2.	"Jewish Town (Krakow Ghetto - Winter '41)"	4:38
3.	"Immolation (With Our Lives, We Give Life)"	4:43
4.	"Remembrances"	4:19
5.	"Schindler's Workforce"	10:36
6.	"Oyf'n Pripetshok And Nacht Aktion"	3:51
7.	"I Could Have Done More"	5:52
8.	"Auschwitz-Birkenau"	3:41
9.	"Stolen Memories"	4:17
10.	"Making The List"	5:06
11.	"Give Me Your Names"	4:56
12.	"Yeroushalaim Chel Zahav (Jerusalem Of Gold)"	2:14
13.	"Remembrances (With Itzhak Perlman)"	5:16
14.	"Theme from Schindler's List (Reprise)"	3:57

== Not on the soundtrack ==
The recordings of "OYF'N Pripetshok" and "Yerushalayim Shel Zahav" heard in the film are very different from the album versions. The recording of "OYF'N Pripetshok" used in the film is from the 1991 film Billy Bathgate. The recording of "Yerushalayim Shel Zahav" used in the film is from the 1991 film Pour Sacha. Both recordings are contained on the soundtrack albums for those films.

Other tracks that appear in the film, but not in the soundtrack, include:

- the famous tango "Por Una Cabeza" by Carlos Gardel and Alfredo Le Pera is played in the opening nightclub scene
- the tango "Celos (Jealousy)" by Jacob Gade plays next in the nightclub
- the German schlager "Die Holzauktion" ("Im Grunewald ist Holzauktion") by Franz Meißner (music) and Otto Teich (lyrics), performed by the Egon Kaiser Orchestra and sung by Rudolf Scherfling plays after that in the nightclub
- "Mein Vater war ein Wandersmann" is sung live by the patrons at the end of the nightclub scene as they take pictures with Schindler
- the German marching song Erika (Auf der Heide blüht ein kleines Blümelein) by Herms Niel is sung by German troops marching into Krakow
- an instrumental arrangement of the song "Szomorú Vasárnap" by Rezső Seress
- an instrumental arrangement of the song "Deine Augen Sind Dein Herz"
- an instrumental arrangement of the song "In einem kleinen Café in Hernals"
- Polish pop song "Miłość ci wszystko wybaczy" "(Love Forgives All)" by Henryk Wars
- Polish song "To ostatnia niedziela" is played at Schindler's birthday party after he kisses the Jewish girl
- Bach's English Suite No. 2, played during the liquidation of the ghetto
- Gute Nacht Mutter, performed by Wilhelm Strienz, plays on loudspeakers as the camp inmates are forced to run naked for inspection.
- Mamatschi (or Mamatschi, schenk mir ein Pferdchen), performed by German Cabaret singer Mimi Thoma, played on loudspeakers in the camp to lure the children out of their hiding places and onto trucks
- "God Bless the Child", performed by Billie Holiday plays as Schindler stays awake at night, deciding to buy the imprisoned Jews from Goeth
- "La Capricieuse, Op. 17" by Edward Elgar, arranged by Jascha Heifetz, performed by Itzhak Perlman and Samuel Sanders, used as score for the scene where Schindler interviews secretaries

In addition, Wojciech Kilar's 1981 composition Exodus for mixed choir and orchestra was used by editor Mark Woollen as the score in the film's teaser trailer.

== Charts ==
=== Weekly charts ===
Weekly chart performance for Schindler's List
Chart (1994)	Peak position
Hungarian Albums (MAHASZ)	22

== Certifications ==
Region	Certification	Certified units/sales
Netherlands (NVPI)	Gold	15,000^{^}
United Kingdom (BPI)	Silver	60,000^{^}
United States (RIAA)	Gold	500,000^{^}
^{^} Shipments figures based on certification alone.
