= Hotel Pod Orlem, Bydgoszcz =

Coordinates: 53°07′33″N 18°00′13.7″E

Hotel "Under the Eagle"
- Polish: Hotel Pod Orłem
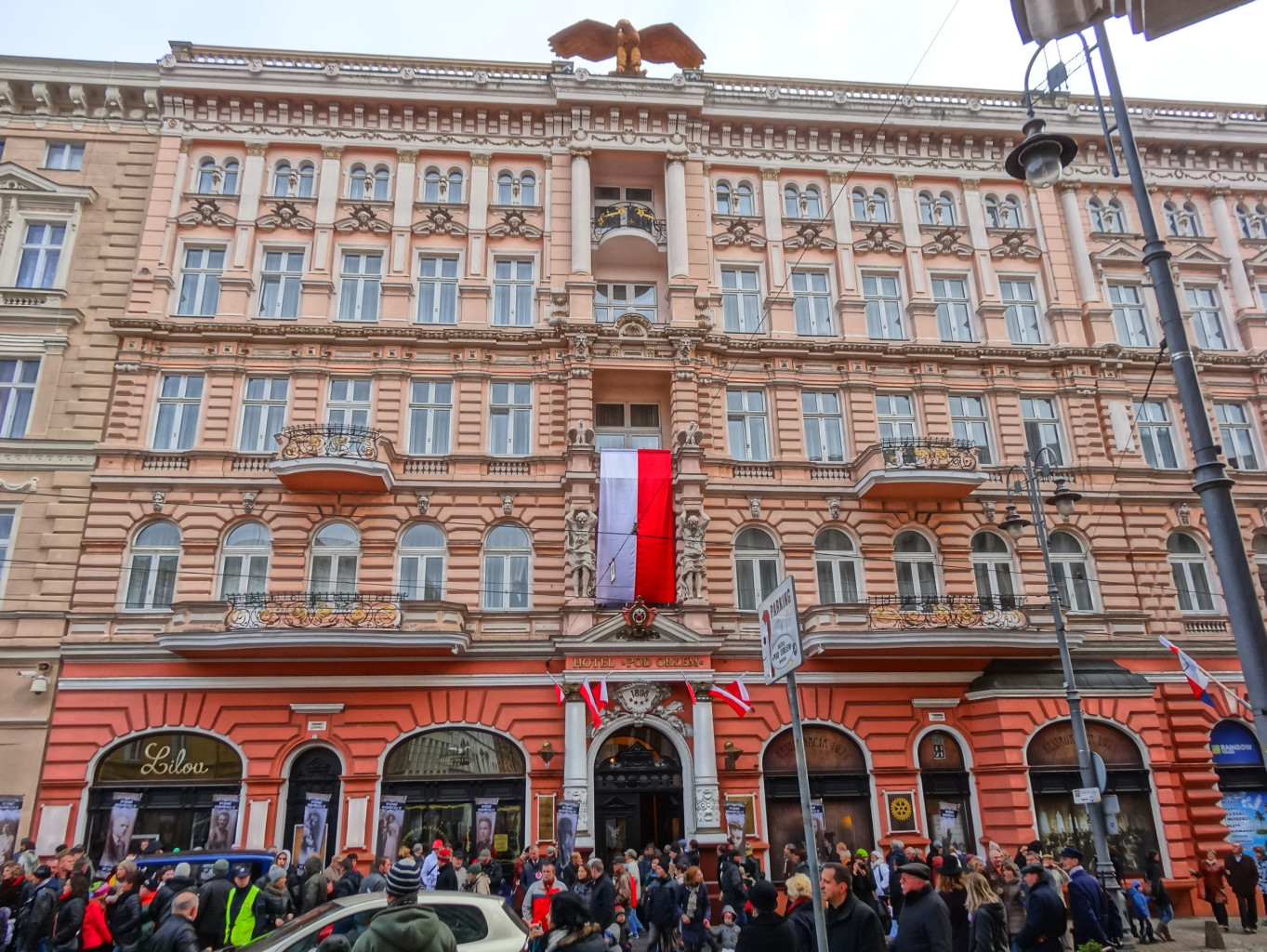
- Main façade of Hotel Pod Orłem
- Interactive map of the Hotel "Under the Eagle" area
- Former names: Hotel Adler (until 1919); Danziger Hof (1939-1945)

General information
- Type: Hotel
- Architectural style: Eclectism, Neobaroque
- Classification: Nr.601295-reg.90/A, December 15, 1974
- Location: Bydgoszcz, Poland, Poland
- Construction started: 1893
- Completed: 1896
- Inaugurated: 15 October 1893
- Renovated: 1926, 1939-1945, 1987
- Client: Emil Bernhardt
- Owner: Hotel company "Majewicz"

Technical details
- Floor count: 5

Design and construction
- Architect: Józef Święcicki

Website
- www.hotelpodorlem.pl

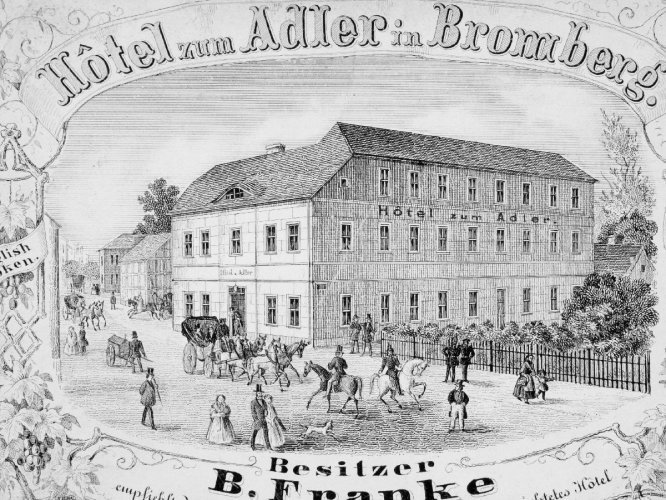
Hotel building cir. 1893

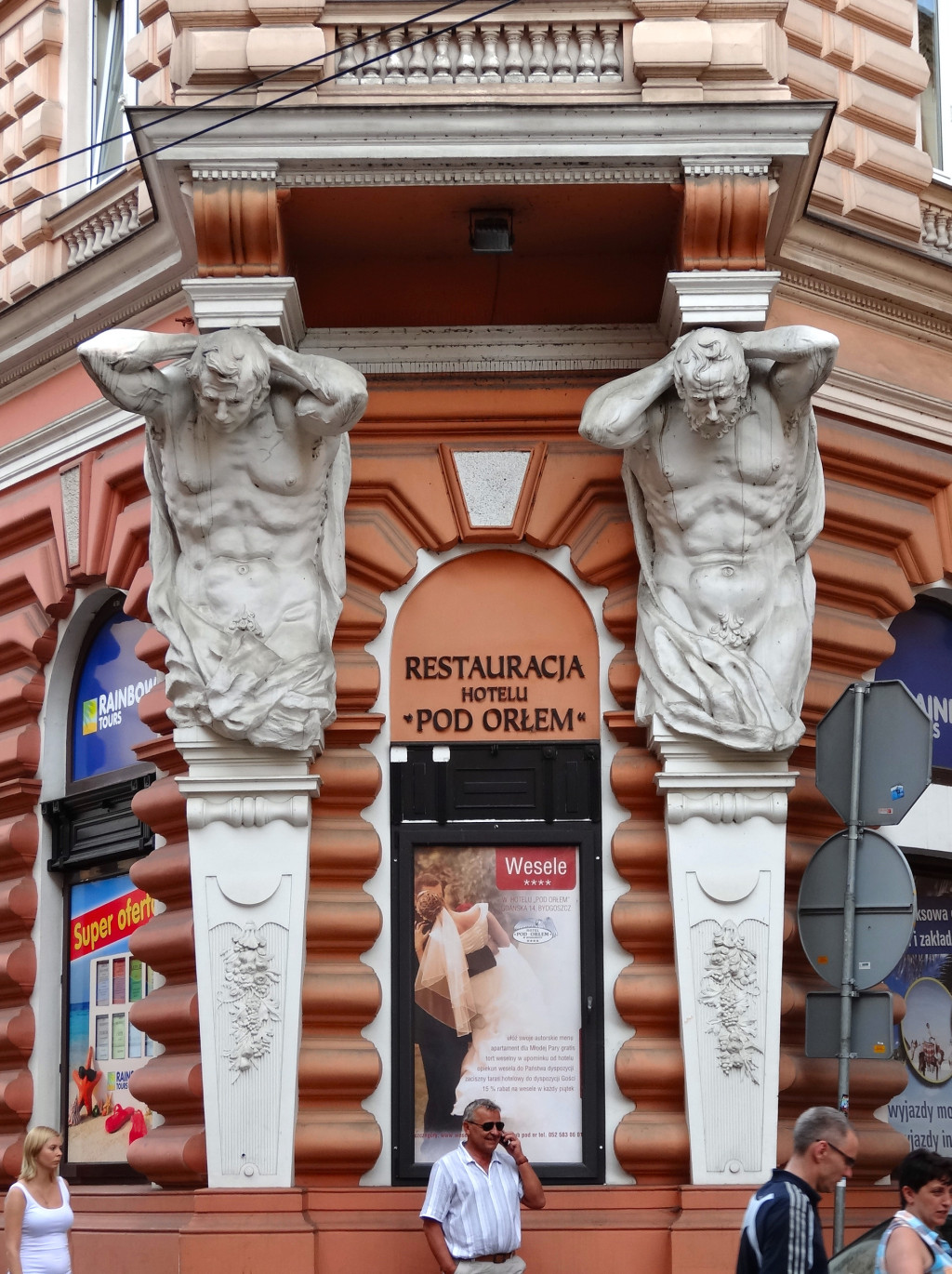
Atlantes on the corner of hotel facade

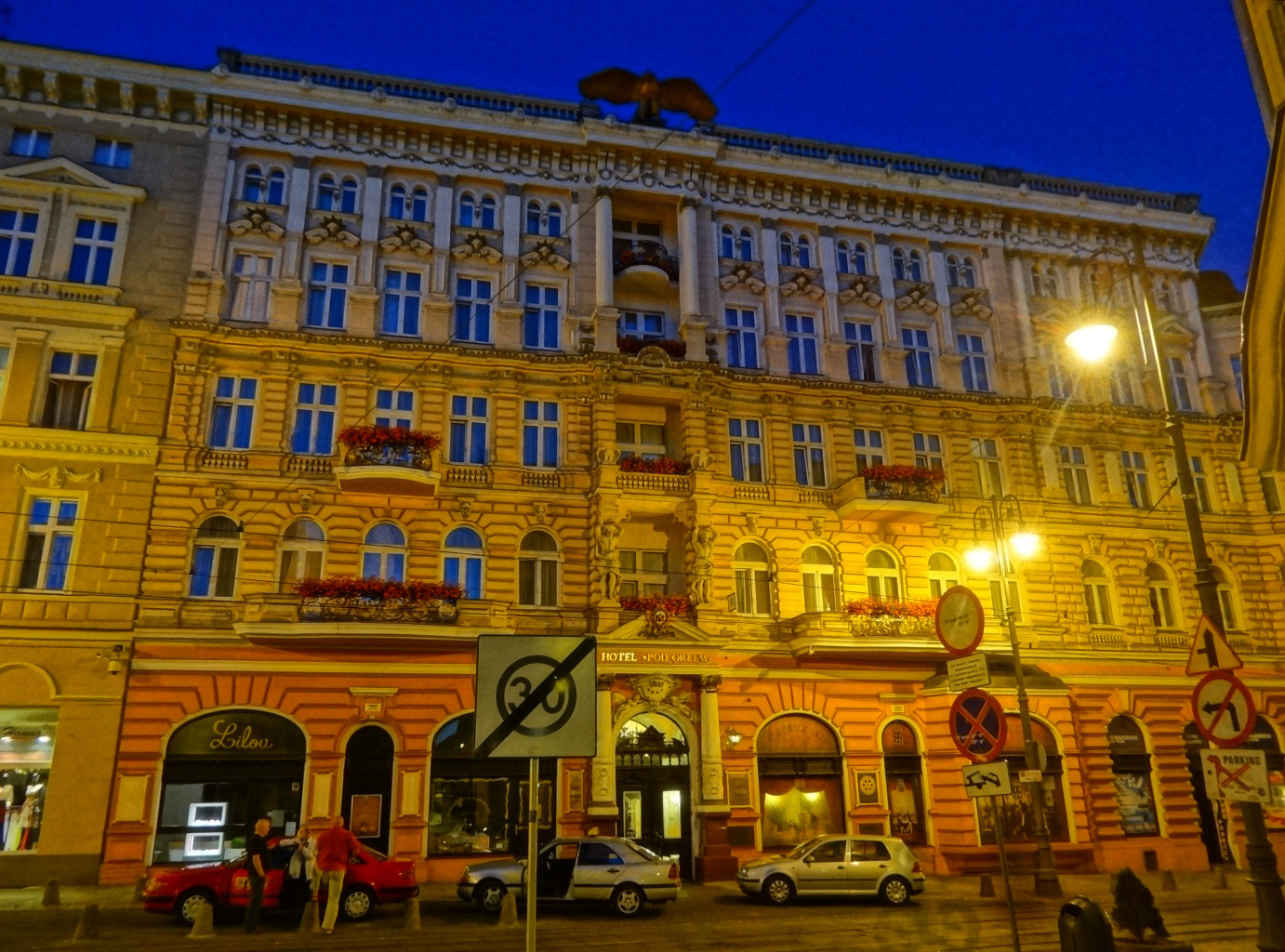
By night

Hotel Pod Orłem (Under The Eagle) is a historical hotel building on 14 Gdańska Street, in the city of Bydgoszcz.

== Location ==
The building stands on the eastern side of Gdańska Street in Bydgoszcz, near Dworcowa Street. The hotel has a "U" shape, with irregular and uneven corners. Its footprint is delineated by two streets (Gdanska and Parkowa) and by the Park Casimir the Great Bydgoszcz to the east.

== History ==
=== Prussian period ===
Hotels in this location date back to the beginning of the 19th century, when an inn was built by the Gliszczyński family en route to Gdańsk. In 1822, a carpenter of the Gliszczyńskis' built a new building called the Hotel "The Eagle" (German: Gasthof zum Adler) next to the old one. Hotel "The Eagle" is one of the first hotels built in the suburb of Bydgoszcz, then officially called Bromberg.

Around 1850, August Friedrich Bernhardt, a baker, bought the building and a nearby piece of land. Between 1875 and 1879, his newly created company was taken over by his son Emil Bernhardt, who had returned from Switzerland where he had taken hotel and catering courses. In 1880 Emil Bernhardt married Louise Müller, daughter of a landlord in the vicinity of Schneidemühl, who had a very substantial dowry. A part of this dowry was likely invested in the construction of Emil Bernhardt's house, located at Gdansks street 16.

In 1893 Emil Bernhardt commissioned a Bromberg-born architect, Józef Święcicki, to realize his new hotel project. This building was to stretch under a huge sculpture of an eagle with spread wings. Święcicki's design was based on similar projects from Berlin and Munich. As a signature, Święcicki hid his self-portrait among the row of allegorical heads adorning the façade. The property was built between 1894 and 1896. When completed, the building became the largest and most modern hotel in Bromberg, with an extensively detailed façade and interior decoration.

In the hotel's basement, the restaurant was adorned with vaults supported by columns, panelling, and wall paintings modelled after the latest Munich fashions, with niches for seating. From the beginning, the building has been equipped with electric lighting, steam heating, and a hydraulic lift. The facility combined the functions of a residential area (with 3 six-rooms apartment of a high standard), a hotel, and a commercial space (with restaurants and shops). Communication between the different areas was provided by 4 network of staircases and corridors. In 1899, the hotel was leased to the Berlin businessman Rudolf Trillhose.

=== Interwar period ===
In 1920, Bromberg rejoined the territory of the Second Polish Republic and renamed Bydgoszcz, and the building was sold to Polish landlord and tradesman Stefan Majewicz for the then-astronomical sum of 1.25 millionDeutsche Mark. During the interwar period, a modernization of the hotel was carried out; it comprised installing new elevators, changing the décor in the guest rooms, and rebuilding the dining room by adding a mezzanine, new panelling and changing equipments. This renovation work was achieved in 1926 under the direction of Bydgoszcz architect Theophilus Biernacki. In those years, balls, receptions, concerts, chamber music and other entertainment were performed in two different halls; "Columns" and "Raspberry." "Column" Hall was famous for its daily concerts of popular music, played by the Bydgoszcz orchestra, and the restaurant "Pod Orłem" (English: The Eagle) was one of the best in terms of design, meals and drinks. It was here that banquets in honour of Marshal Piłsudski, President Wojciechowski and General Haller were given. In the 1930s, social elite met at its "Club of the angular Table" (Polish: Klubu Kanciastego Stołu), among them Adam Grzymała-Siedlecki, Konrad Fiedler, Jan Piechocki, Marian Turwid, Henry Kuminek, Stanisław Leśniewski.

=== World War II ===
During the Nazi occupation, the hotel was taken by the Nazis and renamed "Danzinger Hoff"; Erich Blumm became its director. From 1939 to 1945, the south-west corner of the building was rebuilt so as to widen the Gdanska street.

=== Communist Poland's era ===
After the invasion of Bydgoszcz by Soviet troops, the building was returned to its former owners, who resumed the hotel business as a partnership under the leadership of Stanislaw Lipowicz. In October 1945, the hotel was "nationalized" and referred to as the "Society of Workers' Universities". A few more modifications were performed to the edifice, in particular to the attics. In 1952, the Polish state travel agency "Orbis" took ownership of the "Pod Orłem" hotel. The times when Orbis was managing the hotel were treasured in the memory of the inhabitants of Bydgoszcz. Refined cuisine was praised, a number of prominent guests visited the hotel, such as Arthur Rubinstein and Krzysztof Penderecki), and the hotel was a substitute for international contacts in the times when Poland was cut off from the western world. Since 1974, the property is registered on the list of Polish heritage monuments. In 1987, a major overhaul of the building was carried out, awarded in 1993 by the Minister of Culture as one of the best restored building. In this hotel, on the second floor, the editorial office of Bydgoszcz's "Wolne Związków" - a self-edited magazine of the trade union "Solidarity" (Polish: Solidarność)- operated for some time. The first issues of "Wolne Związków" were published in 1980, with the participation, among others, of Stefan Pastuszewski.

=== Modern period ===
At the beginning of the 1990s, heirs from the Majewicz and Kosicki families claimed ownership of the hotel; as a compromise, a limited liability company ("Majewicz Hotel Enterprise") was created on January 1, 1994, with various individuals holding 51% share, including the heirs of the pre-war owners, and Orbis holding the remaining 49%. In 2003, the hotel ranked in the top 20 of the most business friendly hotels in Poland (ranking developed by the Business Magazine in 2003; out of 1500 hotels in the country selected 20 of the most business-friendly).

== Architecture ==
The building has 5 stories and a basement. Its overall shape consists of a main body and two wings; the North and South. The edifice has been erected in Eclectism style, with Neobaroque references to Rome's Baroque forms. Among the numerous elements that adorn the front, the large-size sculpture of the eagle with outstretched wings which tops the façade is the hotel symbol. The "Pod Orłem"'s façade has 14 windows on each floor. The main architectural horizontal elements are bossages, friezes, cornices and balconies. These elements are balanced vertically by the presence of decorative sculptures and columns that run through the entire height of the façade, along the axis of the main entrance. At the level of the first floor is a loggia with atlantes on the sides topped on the second floor by two eagle figures. The third floor windows are crowned with lintels adorned with a representation of a woman's head on a solar background. On the south-western corner, large atlantes' herms stand at ground level.

The hotel interiors feature many Art Nouveau references; in the lobby, the staircase with gold-colored stained glass, the door handles and the forged handrails have an interwar appearance.

"Pod Orłem" belongs to the four-star hotel category. In 2009, the hotel had a capacity of 39 single rooms, 32 double rooms and 4 luxury apartments. It comprises a restaurant, "Column", and 5 multifunction rooms where can be organized banquets, balls, conferences and business meetings. The largest rooms are the Malinowa ("Raspberry"), Business Center, and Rotariańska.

In the same area, Józef Święcicki also created many other buildings, such as:

- Oskar Ewald Tenement at Gdanska st.30;
- Józef Święcicki tenement at Gdanska st.63;
- Tenement at Gdanska st. 86;
- Tenement at Freedom Square 1.

The building has been registered on the Pomeranian Heritage List (Nr.601295-reg.90/A) on 15 December 1974.

== Distinguished guests ==
- Michał Bajor
- Zbigniew Boniek
- Goran Bregović
- Vadim Brodski
- Janusz Gajos
- Allen Ginsberg
- Janusz Głowacki
- Piotr Paleczny
- Czesław Miłosz
- Ignacy Mościcki
- Tadeusz Mazowiecki
- Adam Małysz
- Włodzimierz Lubański
- Irena Kwiatkowska
- Aleksander Kwaśniewski
- Jacek Kuroń
- Konstanty Andrzej Kulka
- Robert Korzeniowski
- Jan Kobuszewski
- Wojciech Kilar
- Józef Haller
- Yelena Isinbayeva
- Jarosław Iwaszkiewicz
- Krystyna Janda
- Ryszard Kaczorowski
- Bogusław Kaczyński
- Ryszard Kapuściński
- Stanisław Wojciechowski
- William Wharton
- Lech Wałęsa
- Grzegorz Turnau
- Irena Szewińska
- Hanna Suchocka
- Jerzy Stuhr
- Anna Seniuk
- Edward Rydz-Śmigły
- Arthur Rubinstein
- Jeremi Przybora
- Józef Piłsudski

== Gallery ==
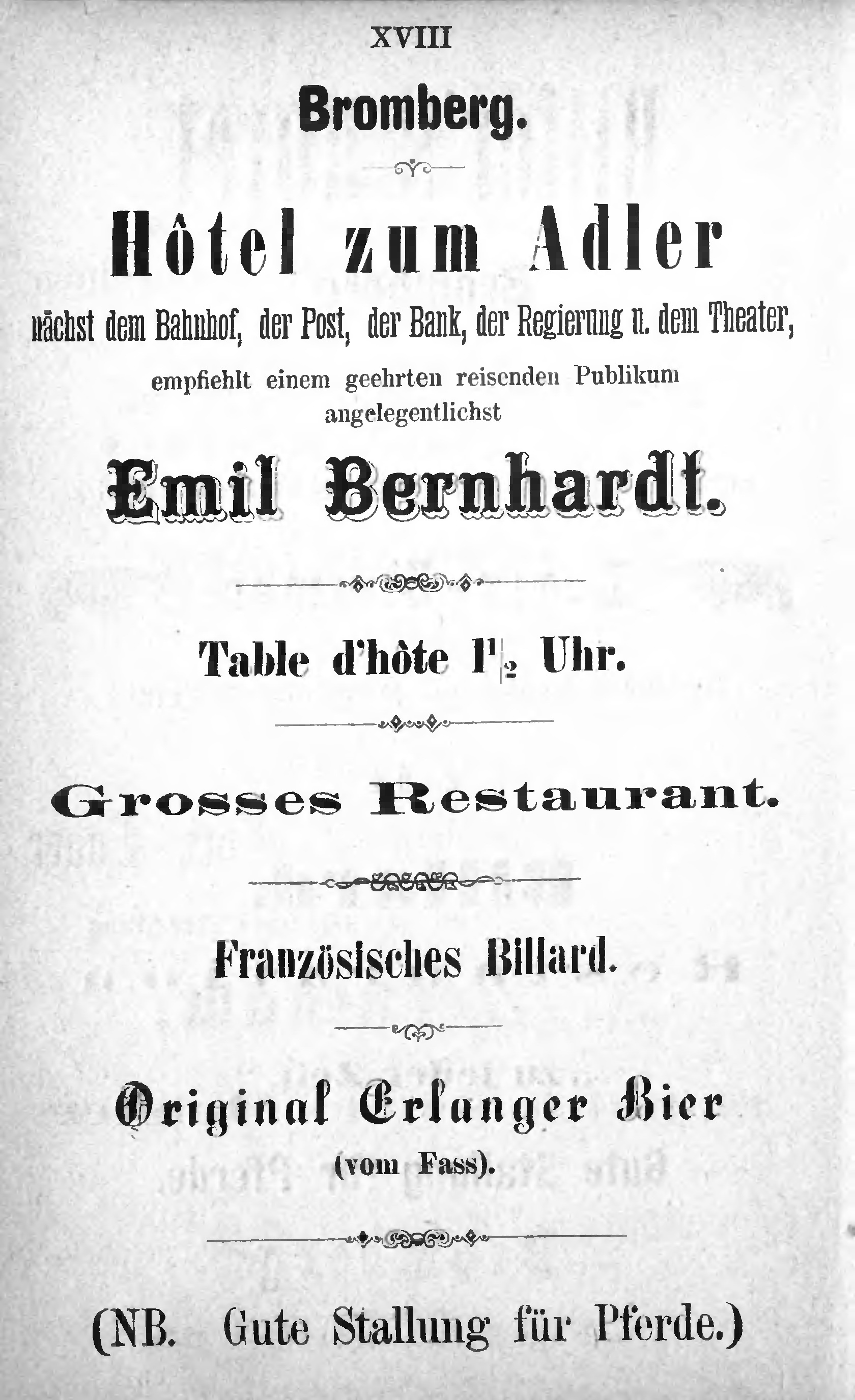
Advertising in 1876

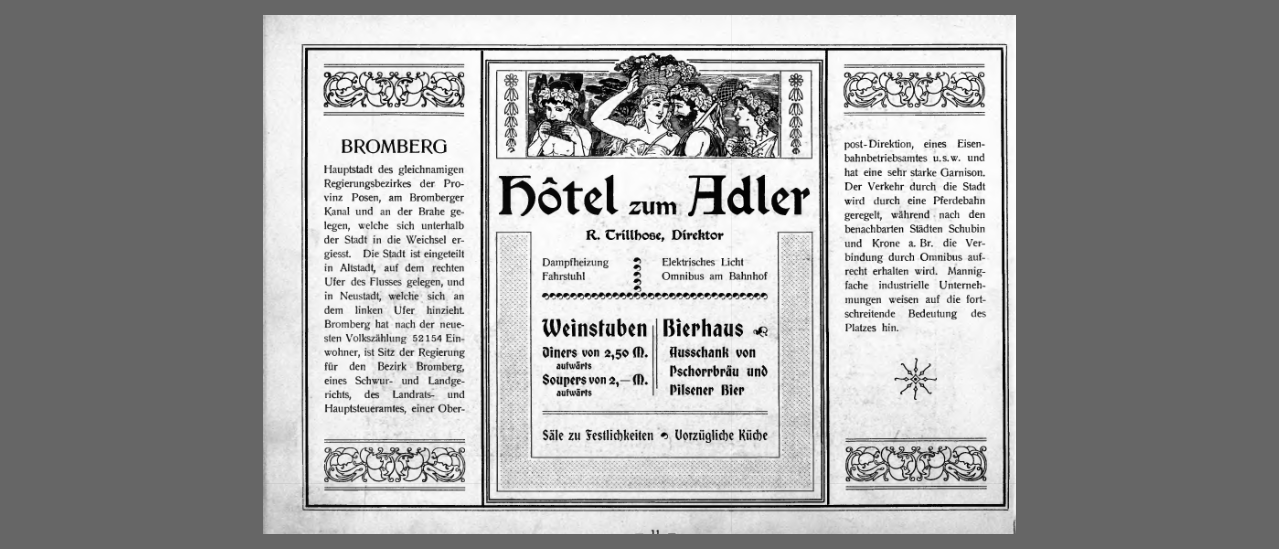
Advertising ca 1900

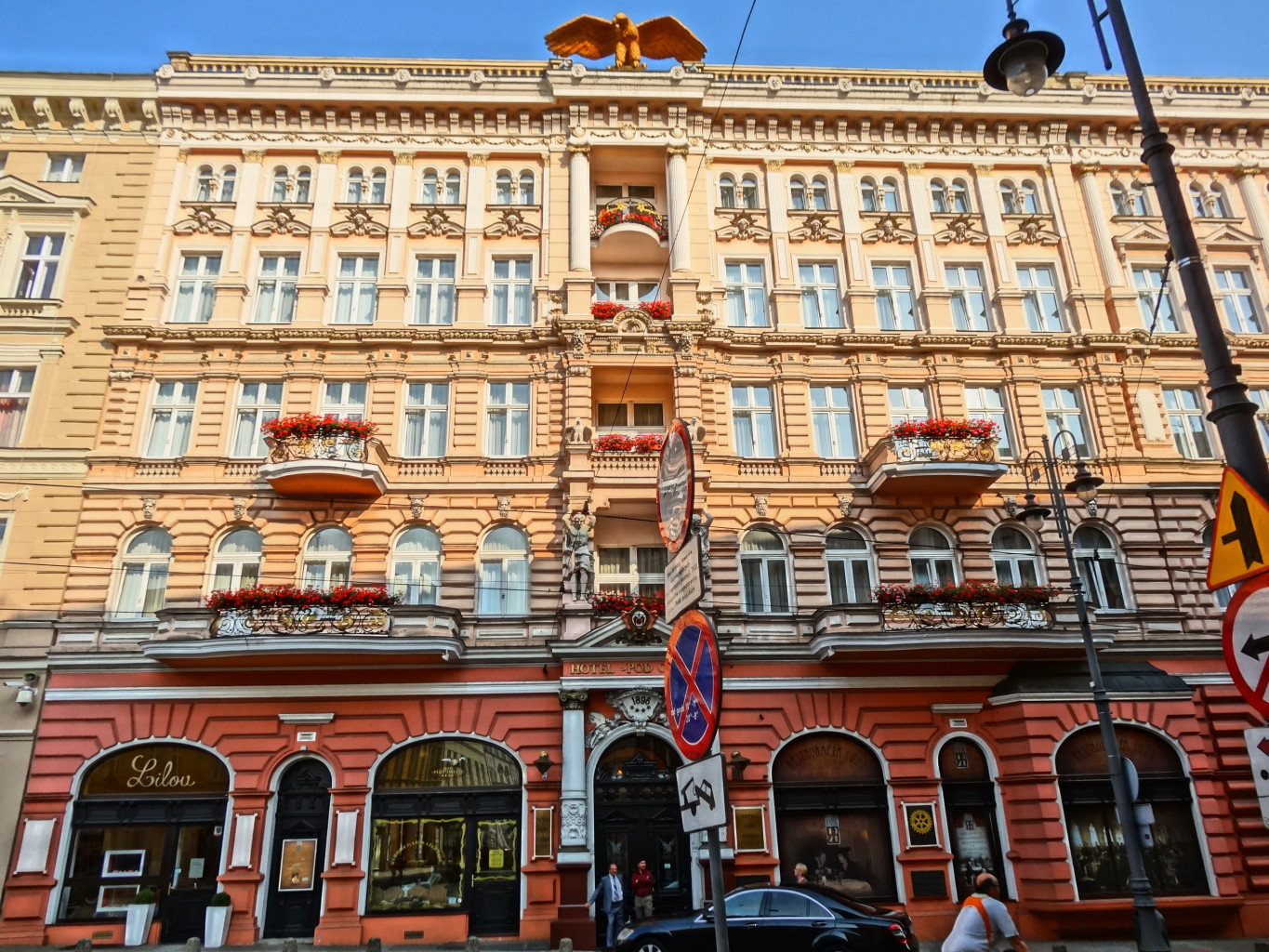
Facade of the hotel from Gdanska street

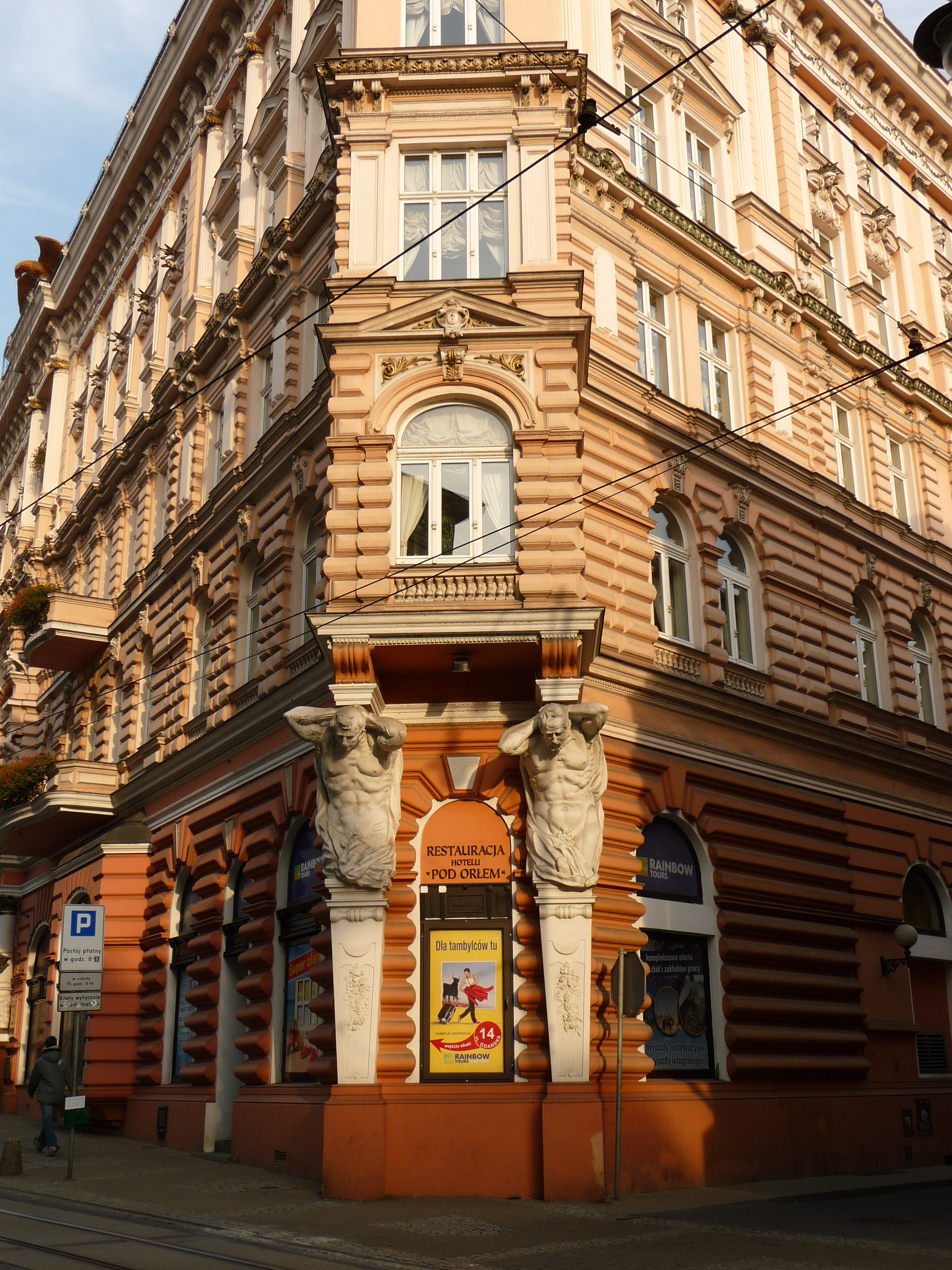
Southern facade of Pod Orlem hotel in Bydgoszcz

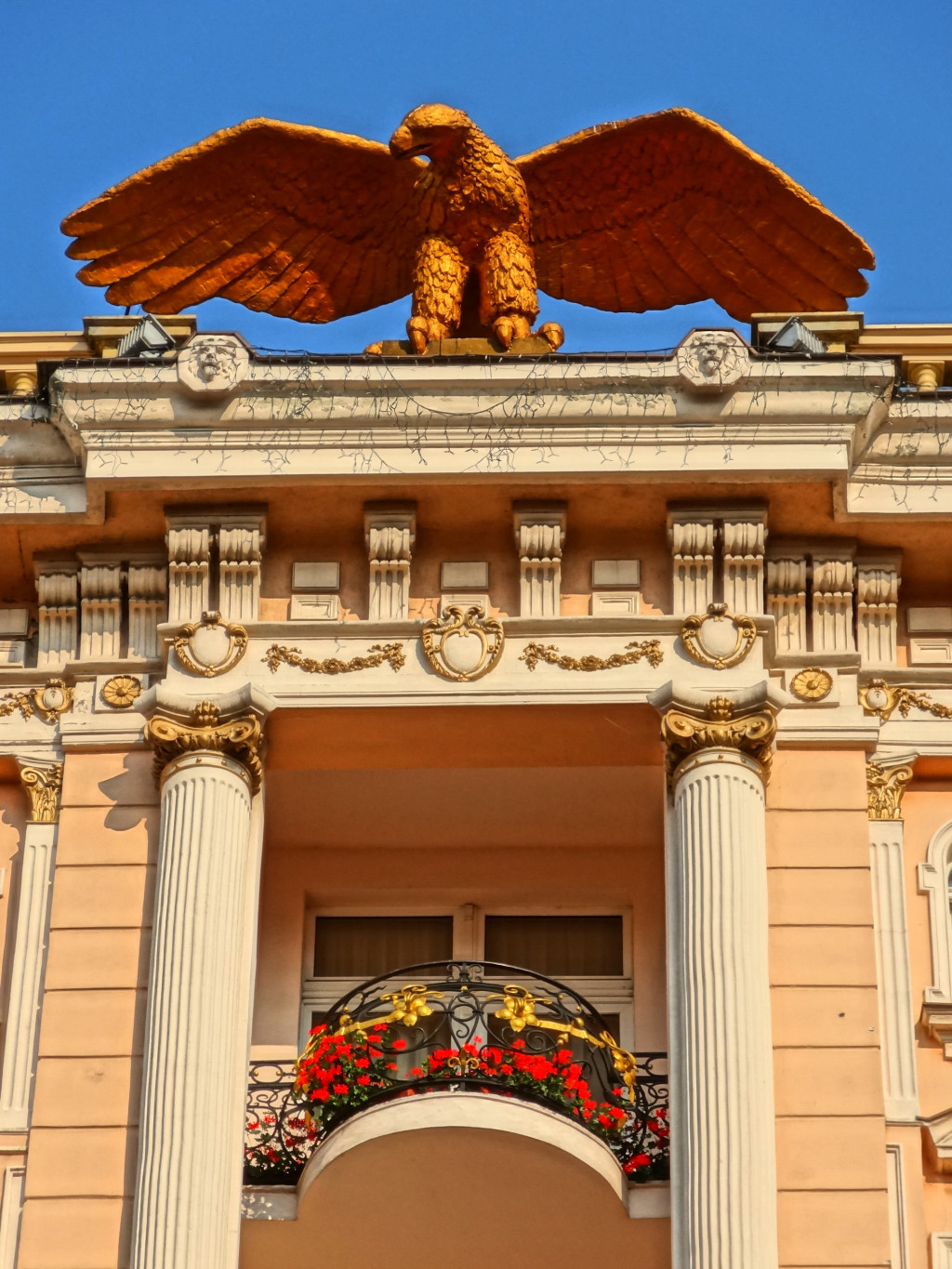
Eagle emblem overlooking the frontage

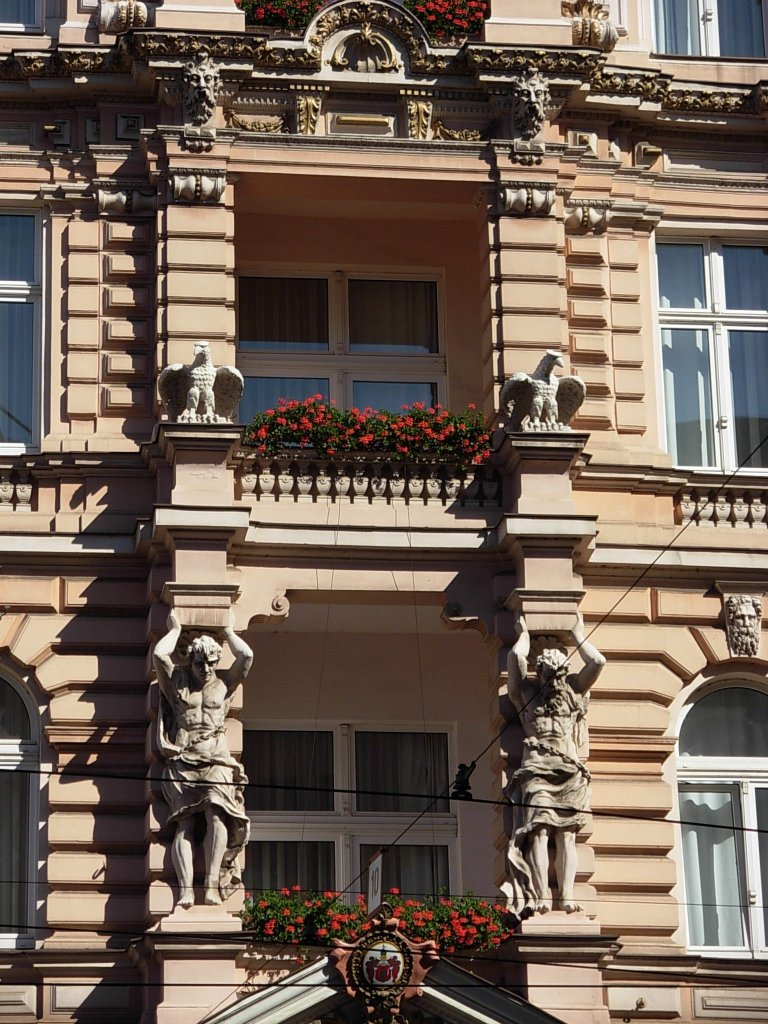
Sculptures and ornaments on the facade

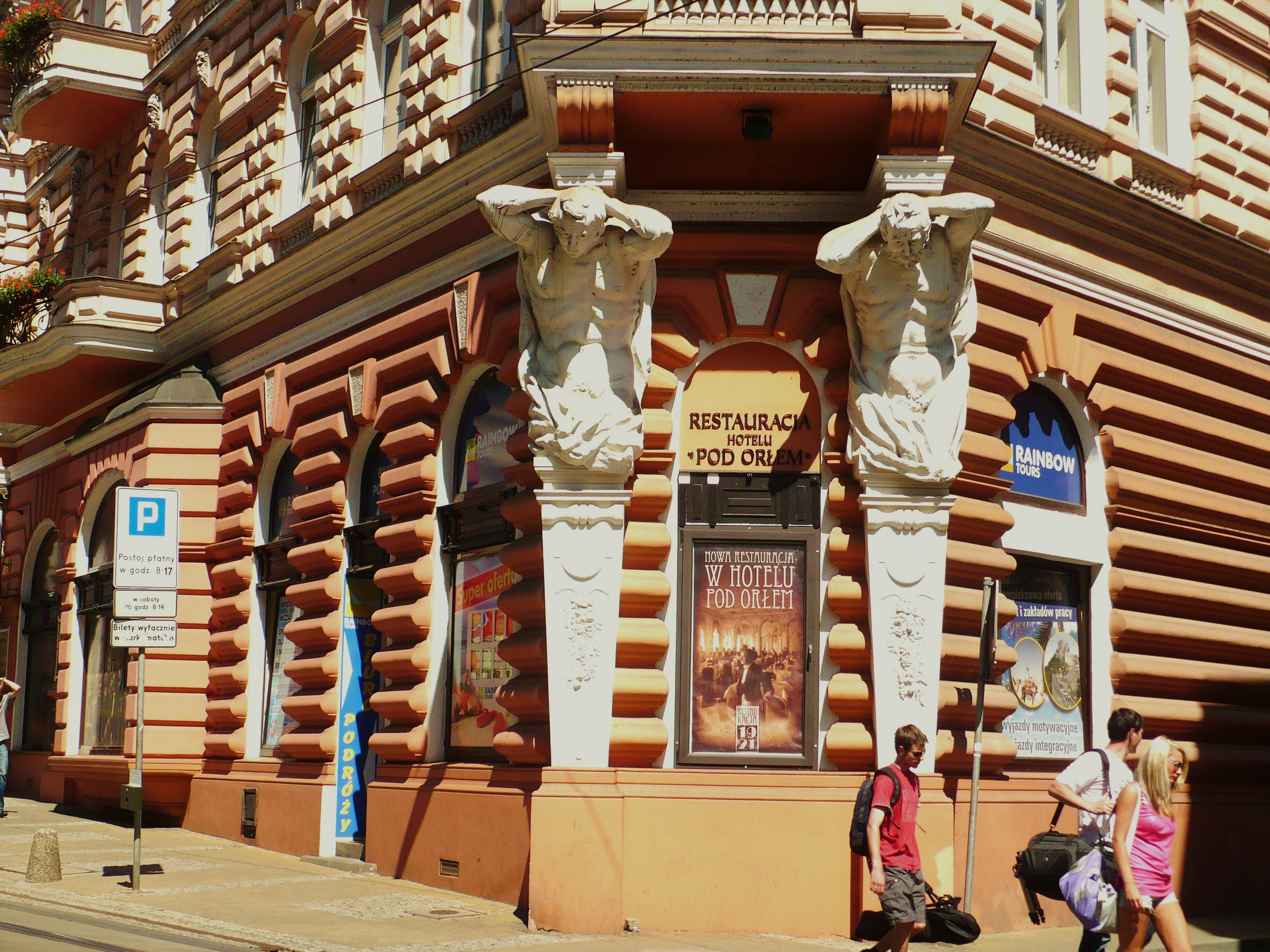
Atlantes herms on southern facade

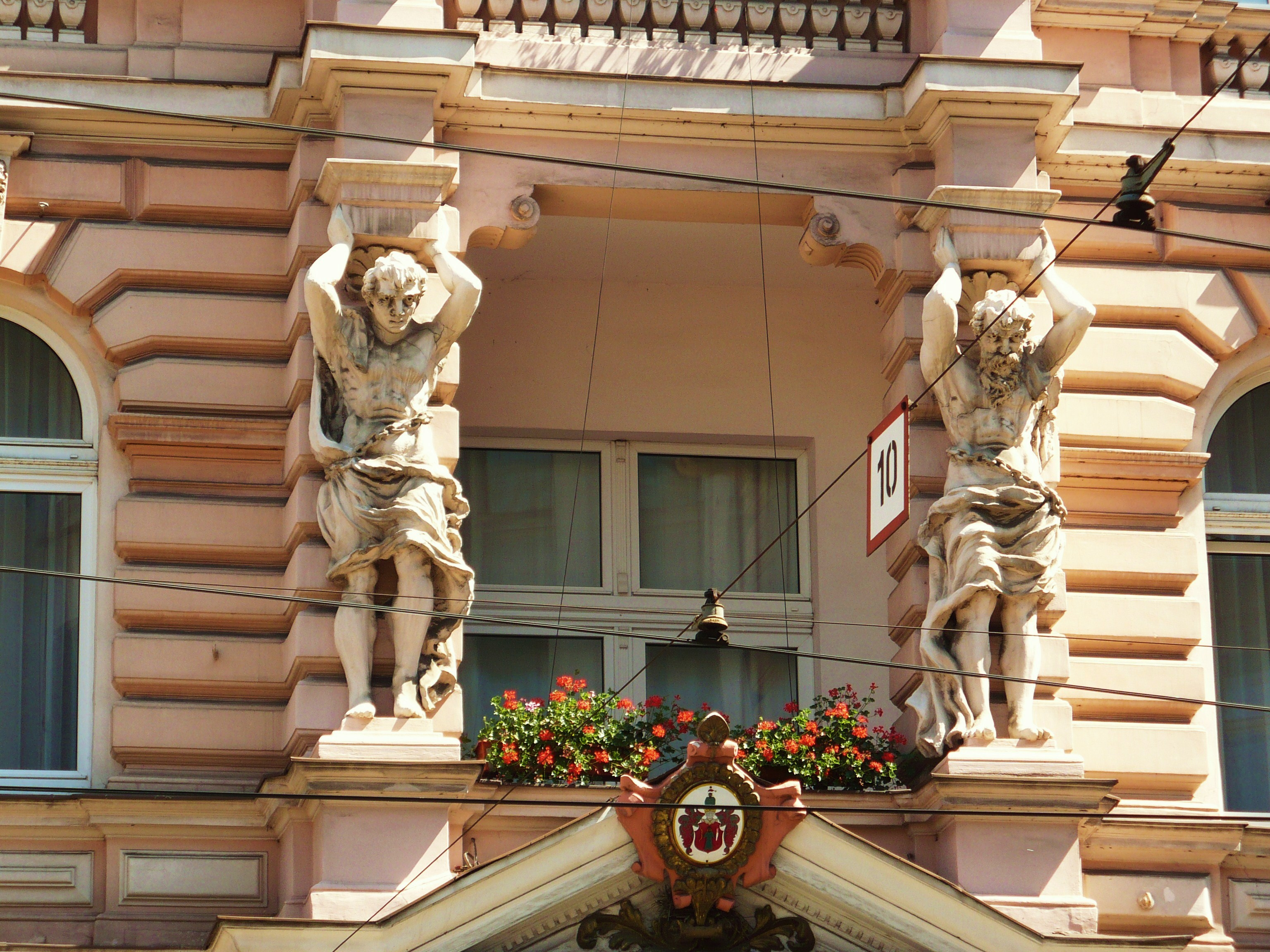
Atlantes on main facade, 1st floor balcony

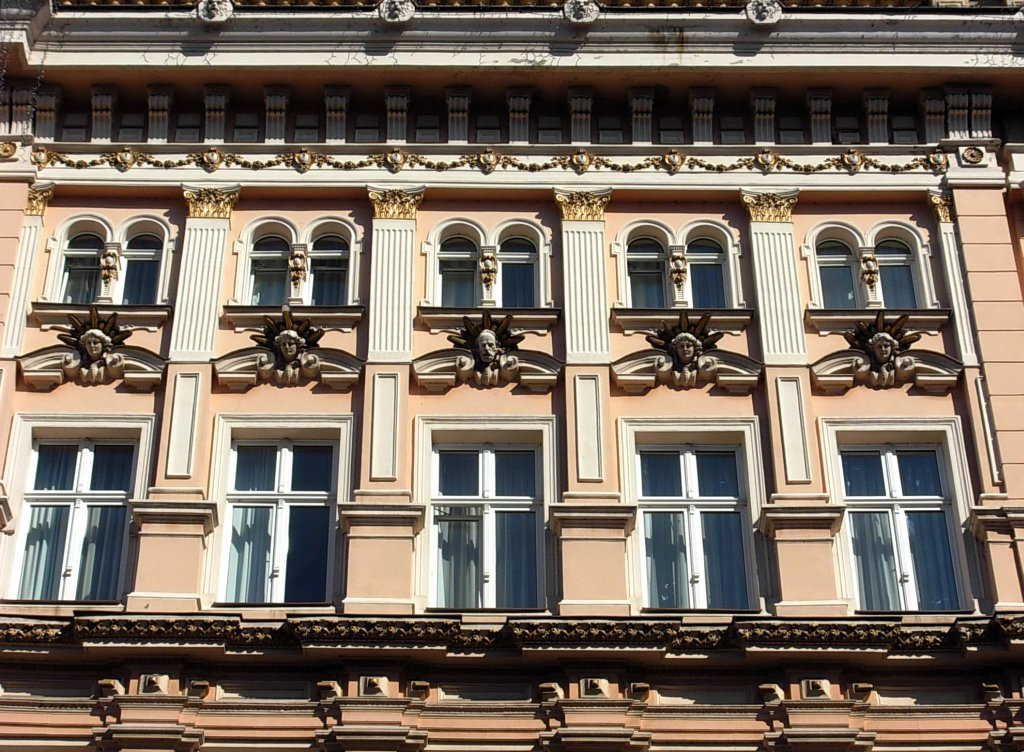
Hotel Pod Orłem mascarons

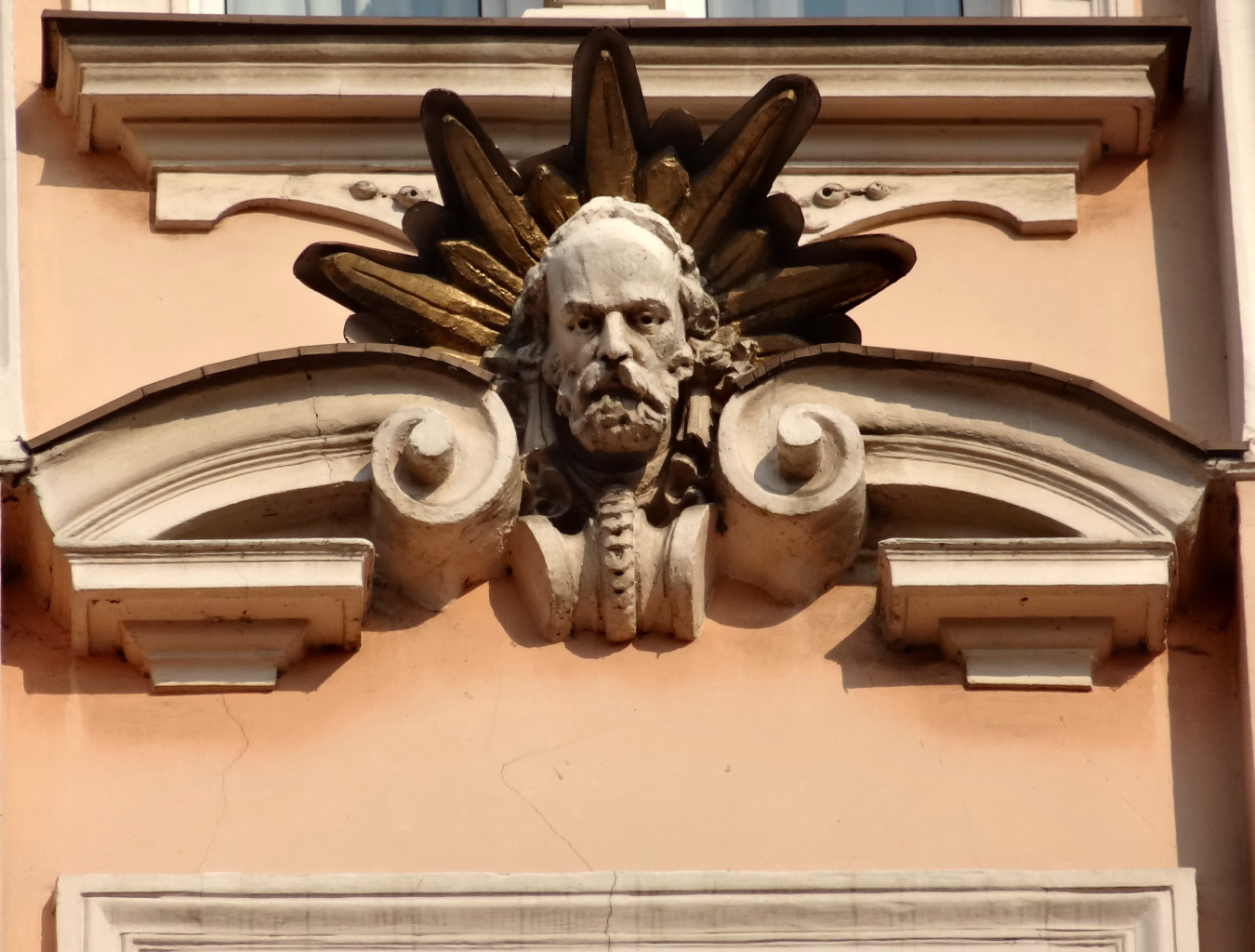
Head of architect Józef Święcicki among mascarons' facade

== See also ==
- Bydgoszcz
- Gdanska Street in Bydgoszcz
- Dworcowa Street in Bydgoszcz
- Emil Bernhardt tenement in Bydgoszcz
- Józef Święcicki

== Bibliography ==
- (in Polish) Bręczewska-Kulesza Daria, Derkowska-Kostkowska Bogna, Wysocka A. (2003). Ulica Gdańska, Przewodnik historyczny. Bydgoszcz: Wojewódzki Ośrodek Kultury w Bydgoszczy. ISBN 9788386970100.
- (in Polish) Jastrzebska-Puzowska, Iwona (1993). Hotel "Pod Orłem", Kronika Bydgoska XIV. Bydgoszcz: Towarzystwo Miłosnikow Miasta Bydgoszczy - Bydgoskie Towarzystwo Naukowe. pp. 45–54.
- (in Polish) Parucka, Krystyna (2008). Zabytki Bydgoszczy – minikatalog. Bydgoszcz: „Tifen" Krystyna Parucka. ISBN 9788392719106.
