= Op. 152 =

In music, Op. 152 stands for Opus number 152. Compositions that are assigned this number include:

- Lacher – Six Songs
- Milhaud – Suite provençale
- Weinberg – Symphony No. 21
