= Emil Bernhardt Tenement =

Emil Bernhardt tenement
- Polish: Kamienica Emila Bernhardta w Bydgoszczy
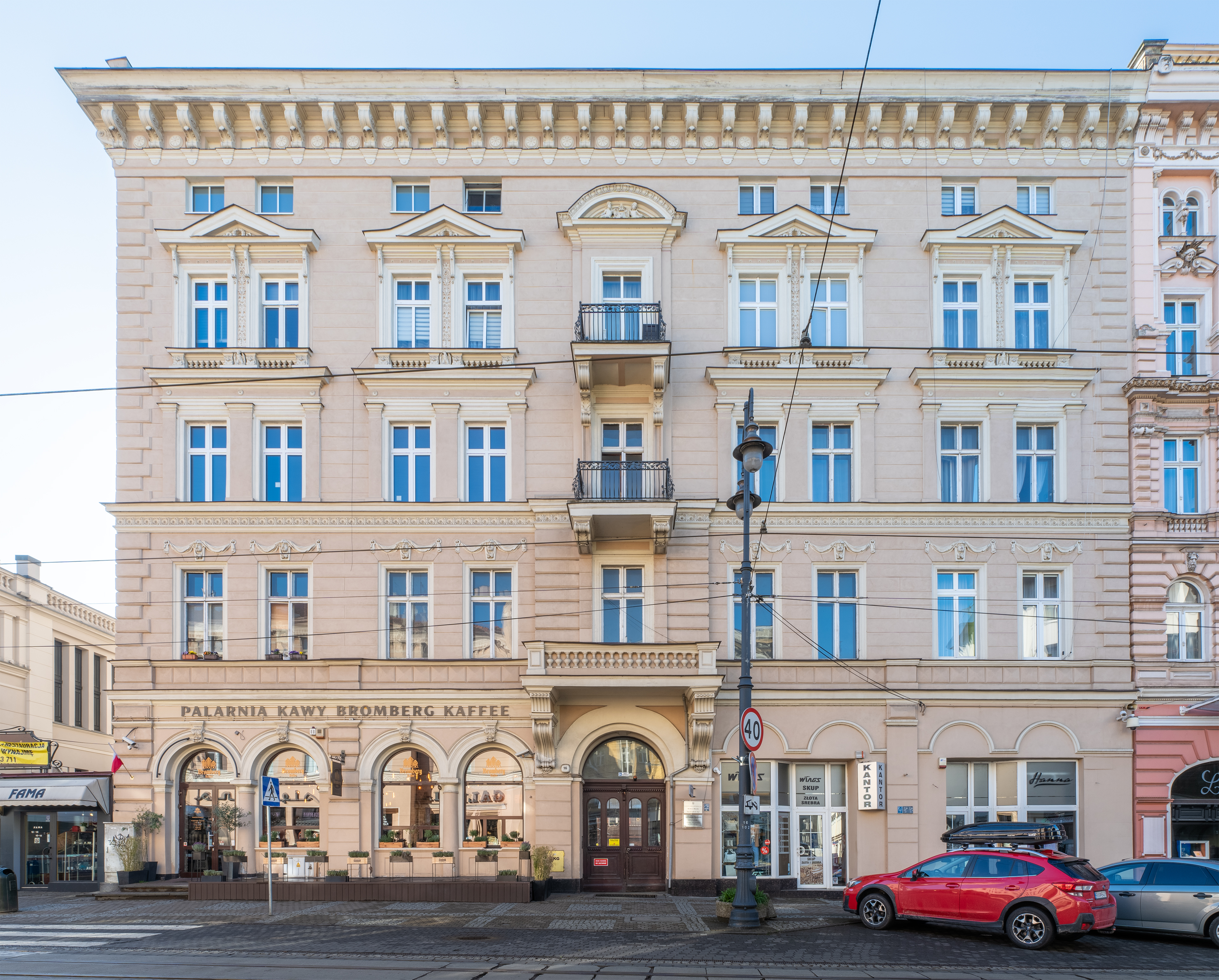
- Emil Bernhardt tenement in Bydgoszcz, view from Gdańska street

- Location within Poland

General information
- Type: Tenement
- Architectural style: Eclecticism
- Classification: Nr.735497-reg.A/1558, 30 April 2010
- Location: Bydgoszcz, Poland, Poland
- Coordinates: 53°7′33″N 18°0′12″E
- Construction started: 1882
- Inaugurated: 1884
- Owner: Emil Bernhardt (first owner)

Design and construction
- Architect: Carl Stampehl

Emil Bernhardt House is a tenement located at 16 Gdańska Street, in Bydgoszcz, Poland.

== Location ==
The building stands on the eastern side of Gdańska Street, at the intersection with Dworcowa street. It is adjacent to the Hotel "Pod Orlem" and is similar in terms of style and dimensions. It is close on the other side to the Pomeranian Arts House, a concert hall, and on the east, the building is bordered by the Park Casimir the Great.

== History ==
The land on which the building stands bought around 1850 by a baker, August Friedrich Bernhardt. Between 1875 and 1879, the newly created company was taken over by his son Emil Bernhardt, coming from Switzerland where he attended hotel and catering professional courses. In 1880 Emil Bernhardt married Louise Müller, daughter of a landlord from the vicinity of Schneidemühl, who made a very substantial dowry. A part of this dowry has been probably invested in the construction of Emil Bernhardt's house adjacent to the plot where stands Hotel "Pod Orlem".

The design of the edifice, realized by master mason Carl Stampehl, was approved on February 13, 1882. The three-storey building displays a facade with Eclecticism style, reminiscent of the Italian Renaissance palaces. It was a construction in the type of German "Geschäftshaus" (house and commercial building), with lodgings upstairs and cafés on the basement.

In 1888, the first ophthalmology office in the city opened in the building.

In 1918, a remodeling of the premises on the ground floor was carried out by architect Gustav Bruschat to house a branch of the Deutsche Bank. In 1920, another reconstruction was performed by architect Rudolf Kern.

From 1920, the building housed one of the finest Bydgoszcz café, the "Wiener Café" .

During interwar period, the Agrarian Bank (Polish: Bank Agrarny) and Poznan BGK (Polish: Bank Gospodarstwa Krajowego) had their headquarters there, along with the German Society for Science and Arts.

== Architecture ==
The building has got a horseshoe shape, following Eclecticism style with classicist forms. The edifice not only provides a balanced facade, but also displays remains of a unique originally polychrome covering all walls of the hallway crossing.

In the courtyard, at the back of the lot is located a residential building with an iron porch and a decorative openwork peak, built in 1882 and designed by master mason Carl Rose.

The building has been put on the Pomeranian heritage list (Nr.735497-reg.A/1558), on 30 April 2010

== Gallery ==
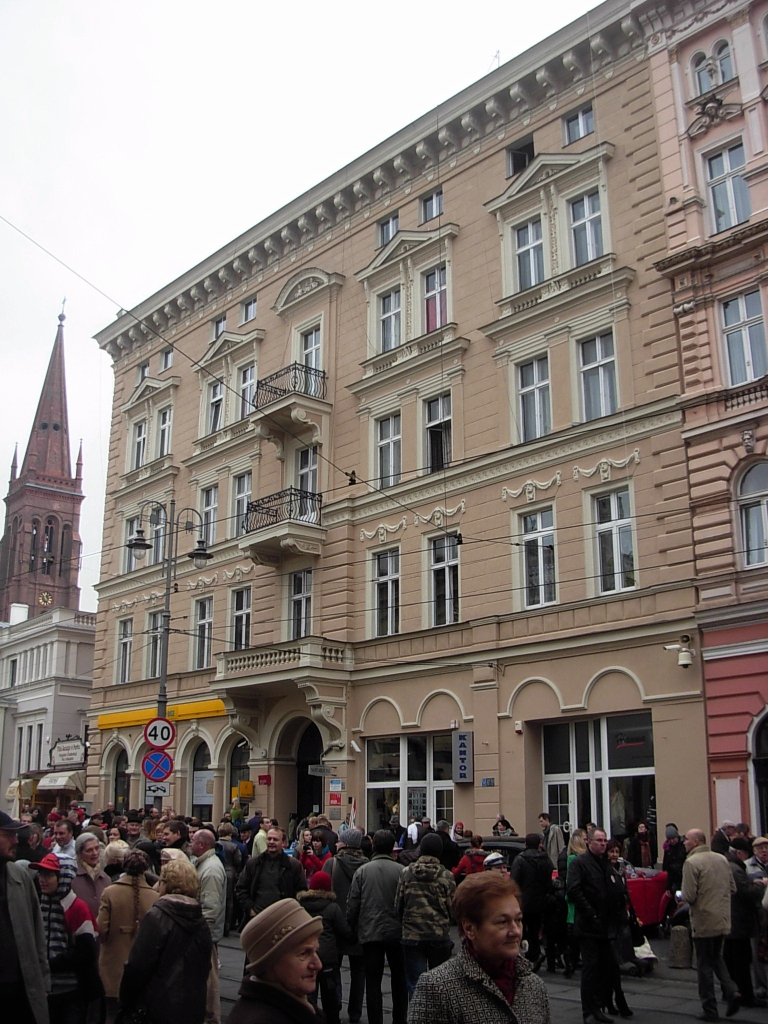
Main facade with St Peter's and St Paul's Church in Bydgoszcz in background

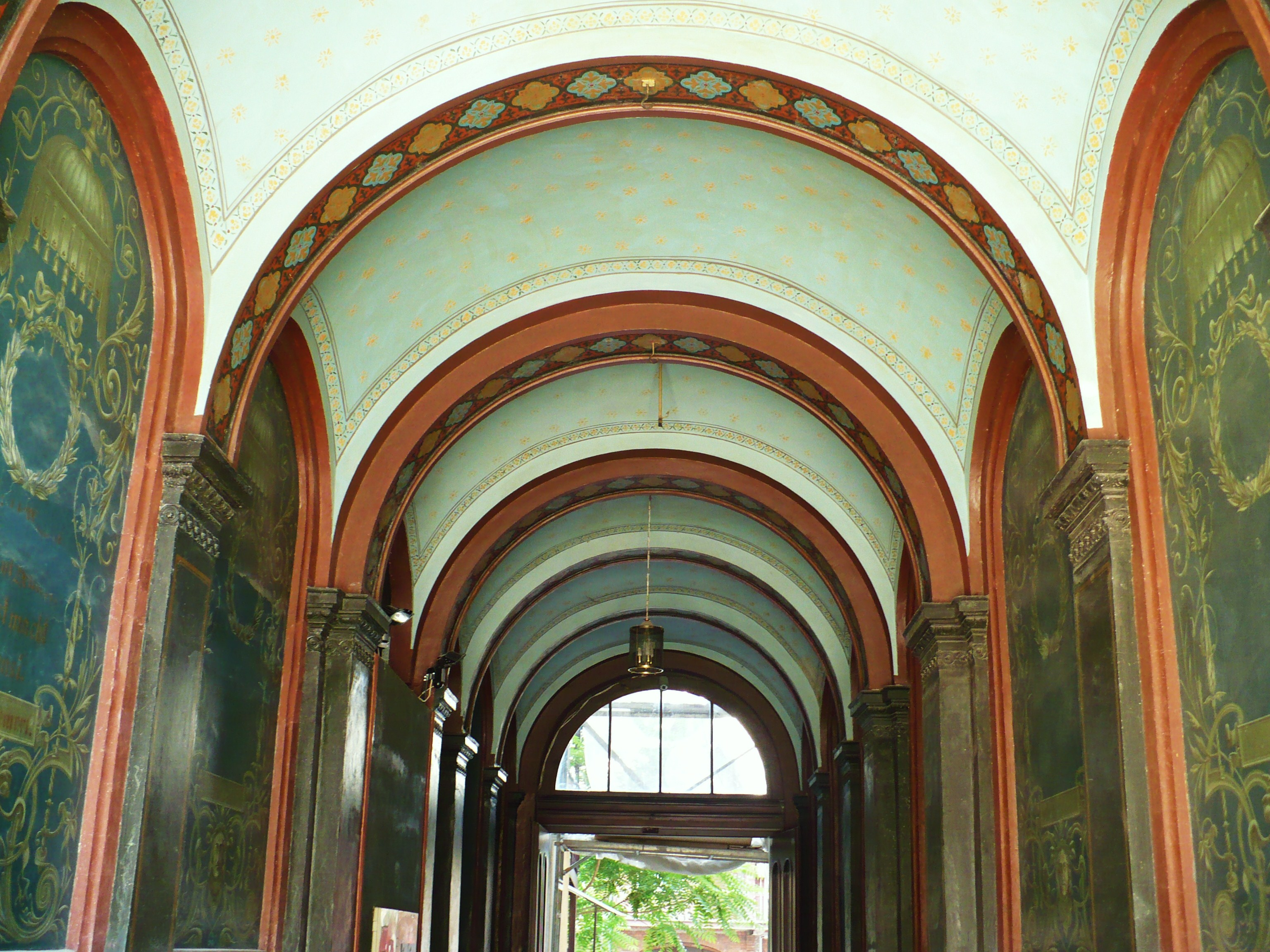
Hallway crossing with frescoes on walls

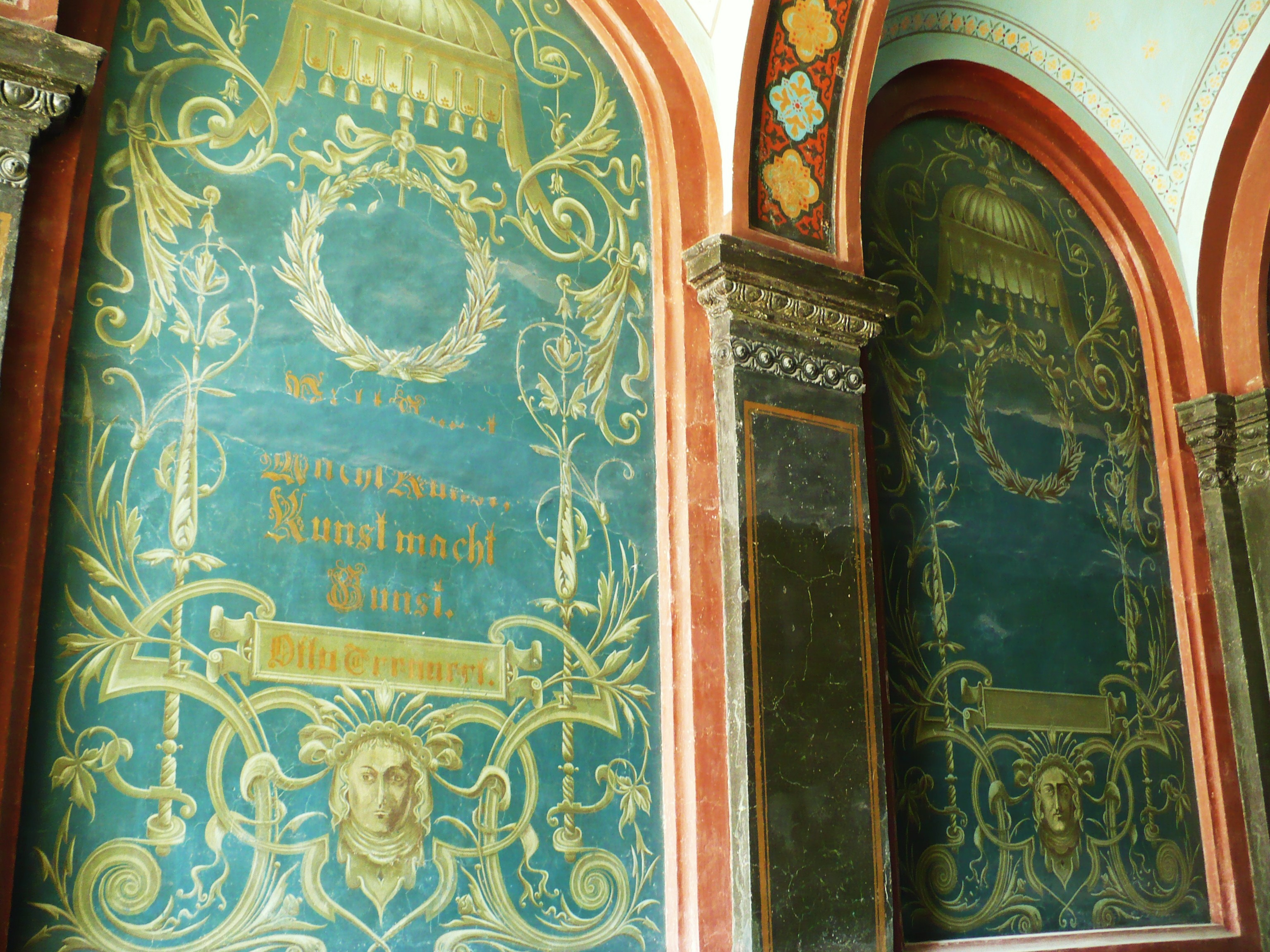
Antique style frescoes (detail)

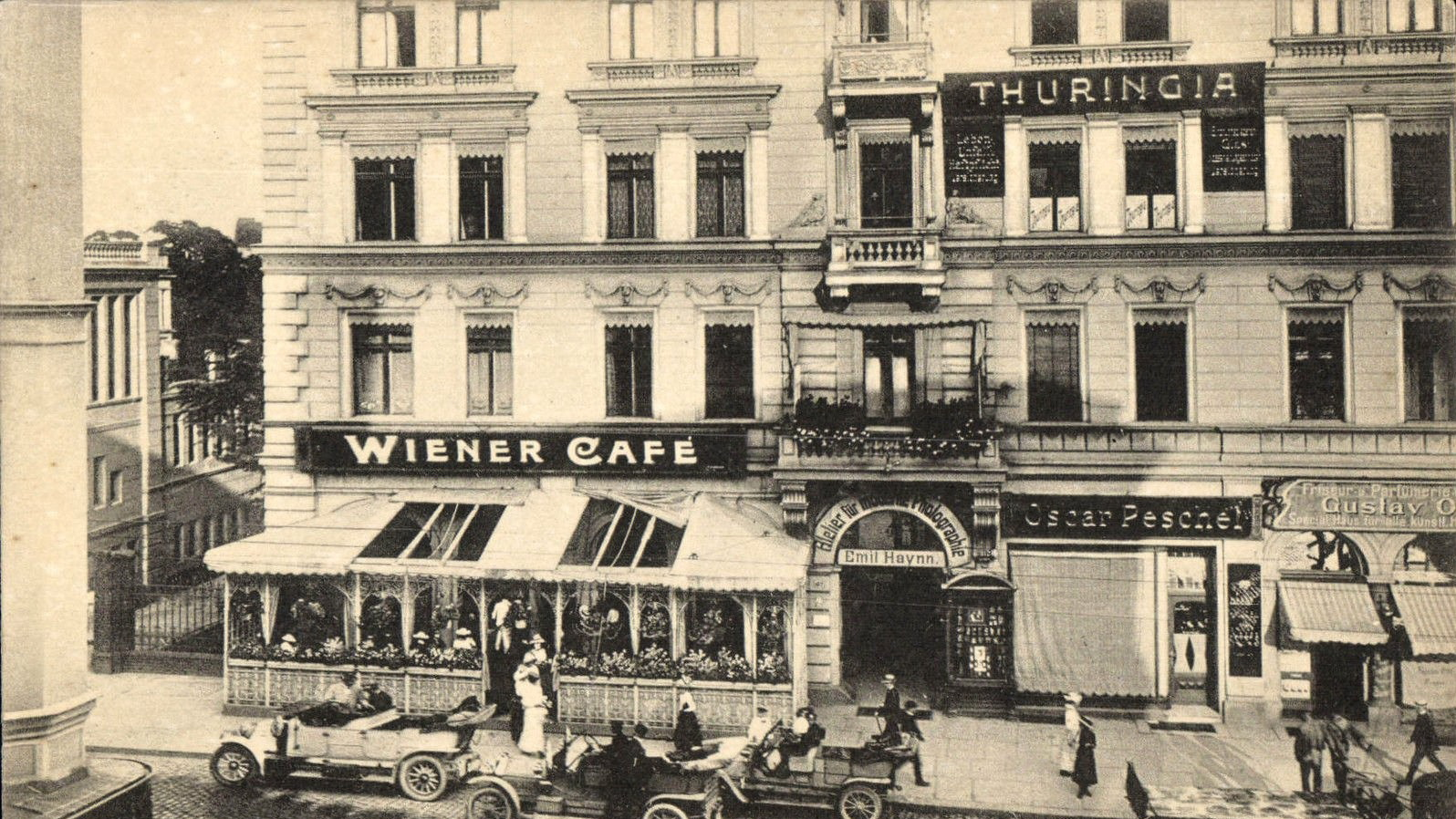
The Wiener cafe in the tenement

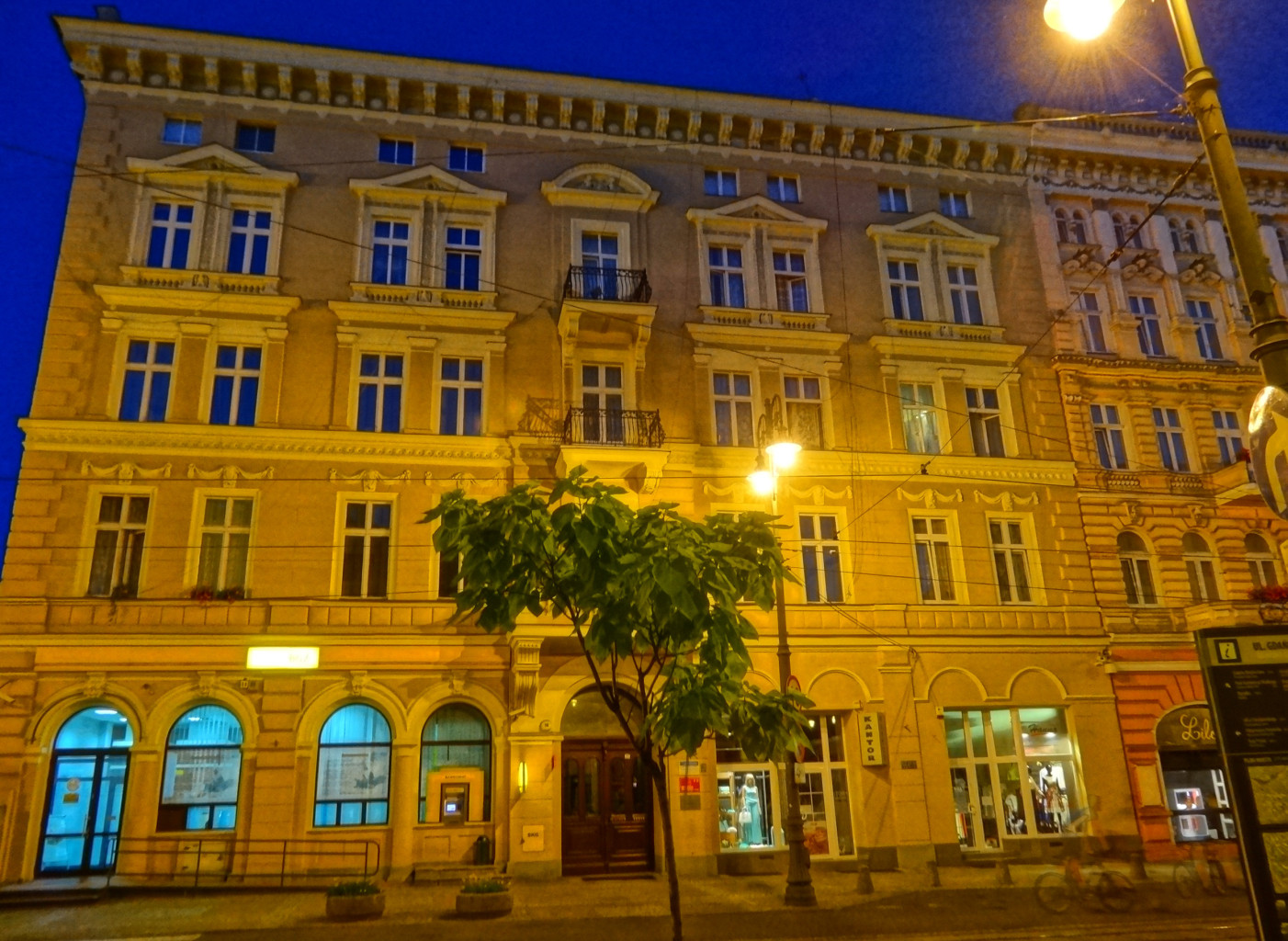
Emil Bernhardt house by night

== See also ==
- Bydgoszcz
- Gdanska Street in Bydgoszcz
- Dworcowa Street in Bydgoszcz
- Hotel "Pod Orlem" in Bydgoszcz
- Carl Stampehl

== Bibliography ==
- (in Polish) Bręczewska-Kulesza Daria, Derkowska-Kostkowska Bogna, Wysocka A. (2003). Ulica Gdańska. Przewodnik historyczny. Bydgoszcz: Wojewódzki Ośrodek Kultury w Bydgoszczy. ISBN 9788386970100.
- (in Polish) Jastrzebska-Puzowska, Iwona (1992). Hotel "Pod Orłem". Kronika Bydgoska XIV. Bydgoszcz: Towarzystwo Miłośników Miasta Bydgoszczy. pp. 45–54.
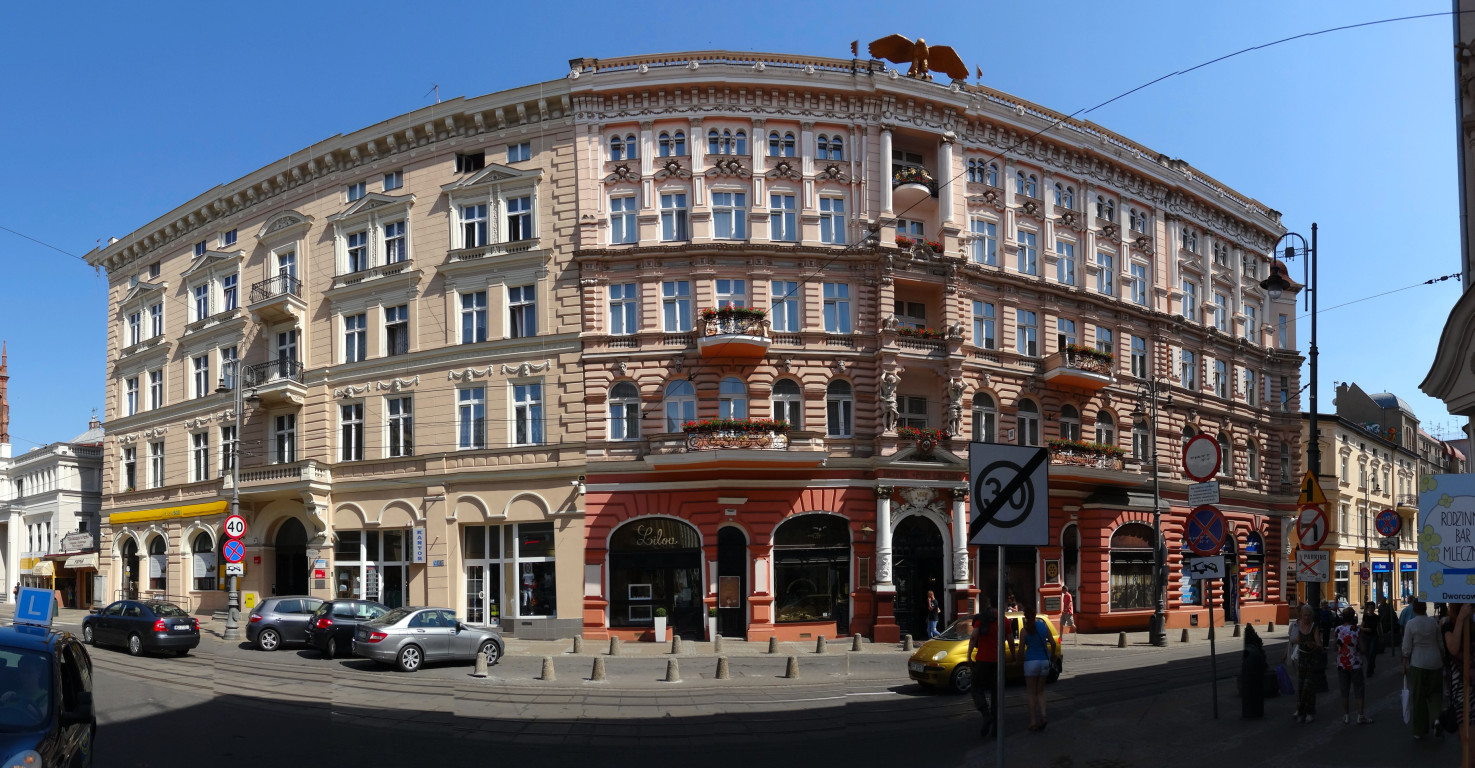
Emil Bernhardt tenement (left) and Hotel "Pod Orlem" (right)
