= Symphony No. 3 (Kilar) =

Symphony by Wojciech Kilar from 2003

- Symfonia wrześniowa
- by Wojciech Kilar
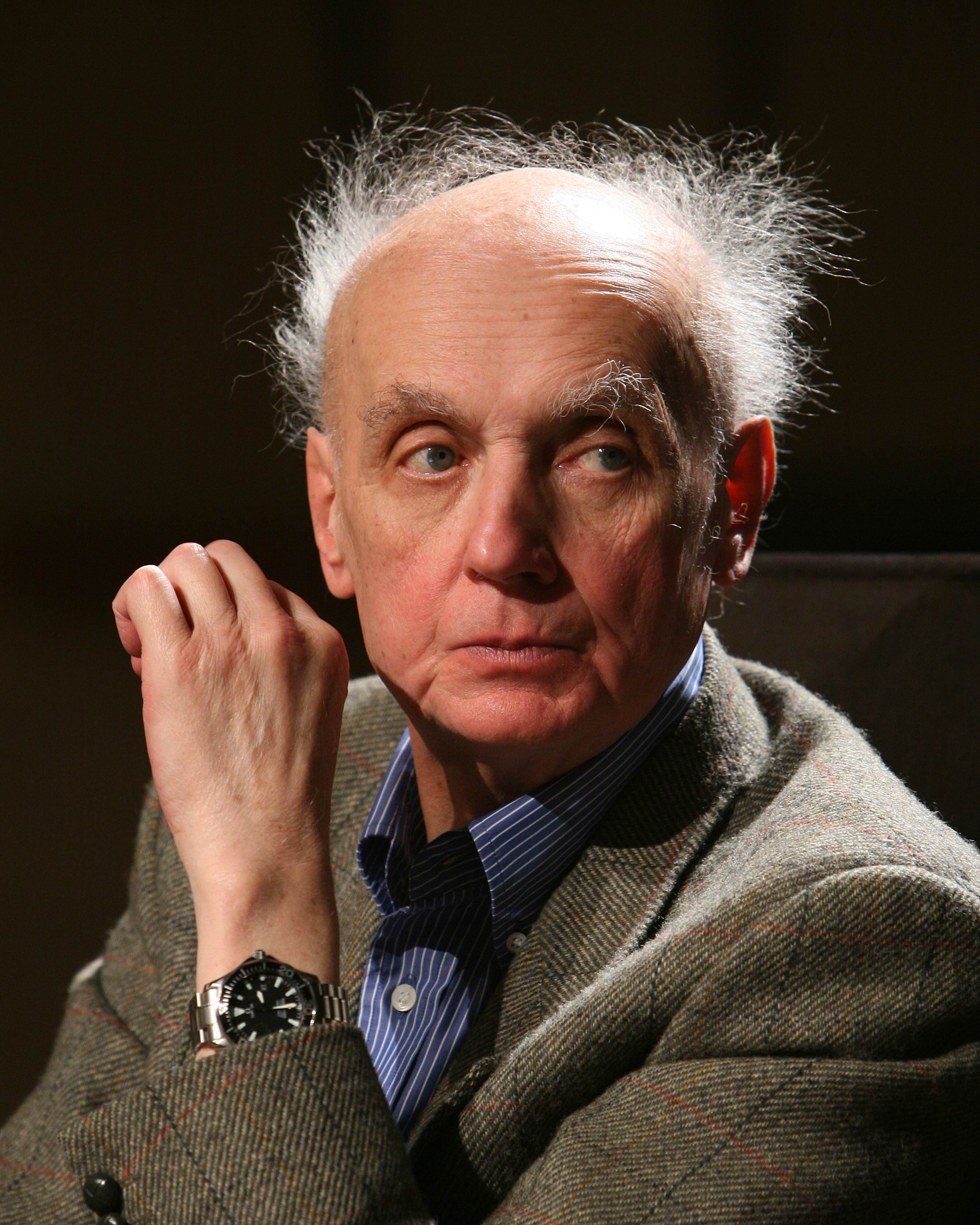
- The composer in 2006
- Composed: 2003
- Dedication: Antoni Wit
- Performed: 2 September 2003: Warsaw
- Duration: 40:00
- Movements: Four

Premiere
- Conductor: Antoni Wit

The Symphony No. 3 also known as the September Symphony (Polish: Symfonia wrześniowa) is a symphony in four movements by Wojciech Kilar.

The impulse for writing the piece came from the September 11 attacks. The composer admitted in an interview with Tygodnik Powszechny that he loves America uncritically and incurably. The author's intention was to encourage the Americans. The work includes allusions to the song of Samuel Ward, America, the Beautiful from 1895. The work was completed in 2003. The world premiere took place in Warsaw on September 2, 2003. The Warsaw Philharmonic Orchestra was conducted by Antoni Wit.

Titles of parts of a work:

1. Largo
2. Allegro
3. Largo
4. Moderato
