= Ballade No. 1 (Chopin) =

Composition for piano by Frédéric Chopin

- Ballade by Frédéric Chopin
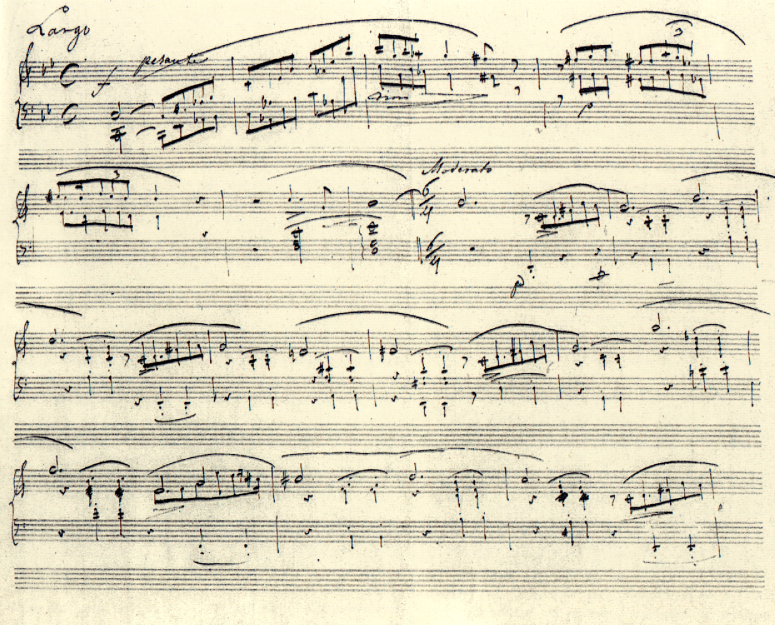
- First page of manuscript
- Key: G minor
- Opus: 23
- Composed: 1835
- Dedication: Baron Nathaniel von Stockhausen
- Published: 1836
- Duration: 9–10 minutes

The Ballade No. 1 in G minor, Op. 23 is a ballade for solo piano by Frédéric Chopin. Completed in 1835 and published in 1836, it is generally considered one of Chopin's greatest and most popular works. A typical performance spans nine to ten minutes.

== History ==
Ballade No. 1
Performed by Frank Lévy

The ballade dates to sketches Chopin made in 1831, during his eight-month stay in Vienna. It was completed in 1835 after his move to Paris, where he dedicated it to Baron Nathaniel von Stockhausen, the Hanoverian ambassador to France.

After Chopin had visited Robert Schumann in Leipzig in fall 1836, Schumann wrote: "I have a new Ballade by Chopin. It seems to me to be the work closest to his genius (though not the most brilliant). I even told him that it is my favourite of all his works. After a long, reflective pause he told me emphatically: 'I am glad, because I too like it the best, it is my dearest work.'"

== Structure ==
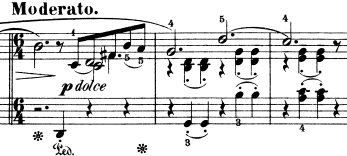
Main theme of Ballade No. 1

The piece begins in the first inversion of the A♭ major chord, a Neapolitan chord, which implies a majestic aura, ending in a dissonant left-hand chord D, G, and E♭ that is not resolved until later on in the piece. Though Chopin's original manuscript clearly marks an E♭ as the top note, the chord has caused some degree of controversy, and thus, some versions of the work – such as the Klindworth edition – include D, G, D as an ossia.

The main section of the ballade is built from two main themes. The brief introduction fades into the first theme in G minor, introduced at measure 8. After dramatic development, the second theme in E♭ major is introduced softly at measure 68. The exposition is once again followed by development, in which the two themes, transferred to another tonal center (A minor and A major), undergo transformation. Then, a reprise presents the two themes in their original keys, albeit in reverse order.

A thundering chord introduces the coda, marked Presto con fuoco, to which the initial Neapolitan harmony re-emerges in constant dynamic forward propulsion, which eventually ends the piece in a fiery double octave scale run down the keyboard.

As a whole, the piece is structurally complex and not strictly confined to any particular form, but incorporates ideas from mainly the sonata and variation forms. A distinguishing feature is its time signature. While the other three ballades are written in strict compound duple time with a 6/8 time signature, Ballade No. 1 bears deviations from this. The introduction is written in 4/4 time, and the more extensive Presto con fuoco coda is written in 2/2. The rest of the piece is written in 6/4, rather than the 6/8 which characterizes the others. Like the other three ballades, this ballade is considered one of Chopin's most technically and musically demanding works.

== In popular culture ==
The ballade has featured prominently in several films. It is performed on-screen in Gaslight by the Polish pianist Jakob Gimpel, credited as the Pianist. A performance of the piece is central to the plot of the 2002 Roman Polanski film The Pianist, where it moves a German officer to help the eponymous protagonist and supplies him with food. On the soundtrack, it is performed by Janusz Olejniczak. It also appears in the 1991 film Impromptu, where Chopin is playing this piece when he is interrupted by George Sand and meets her for the first time.

In 2010, the British journalist Alan Rusbridger (the editor of The Guardian) dedicated a year to learning Ballade No. 1 and produced a book about the experience, Play It Again: An Amateur Against the Impossible.

The piece was also the subject of the 2013 Channel 4 documentary Chopin Saved My Life. It is quoted in Mieczysław Weinberg's Symphony No. 21 ("Kaddish").

After Chopin's death, the Belgian violinist and musician Eugène Ysaÿe made his own arrangement of Ballade No. 1 for violin and piano.

Japanese figure skater and two-time Olympic champion Yuzuru Hanyu skated his short program to Ballade No. 1 in four seasons between 2014 and 2020. The program has earned him four world records, such as the completion of the first career Super Slam in the men's singles discipline, and contributed to the win of his second Olympic title. As of December 2021, Hanyu's Ballade No. 1 had set the five highest short program scores across all judging systems and was the most successful program in that competition segment.

This work is also featured prominently in the light novel, manga and anime Your Lie in April by Naoshi Arakawa. It is played in its violin and piano arrangement arranged by Masaru Yokoyama who had also composed the majority of the background music of the anime.
