= Symphony No. 5 (Kilar) =

- Adwentowa
- by Wojciech Kilar
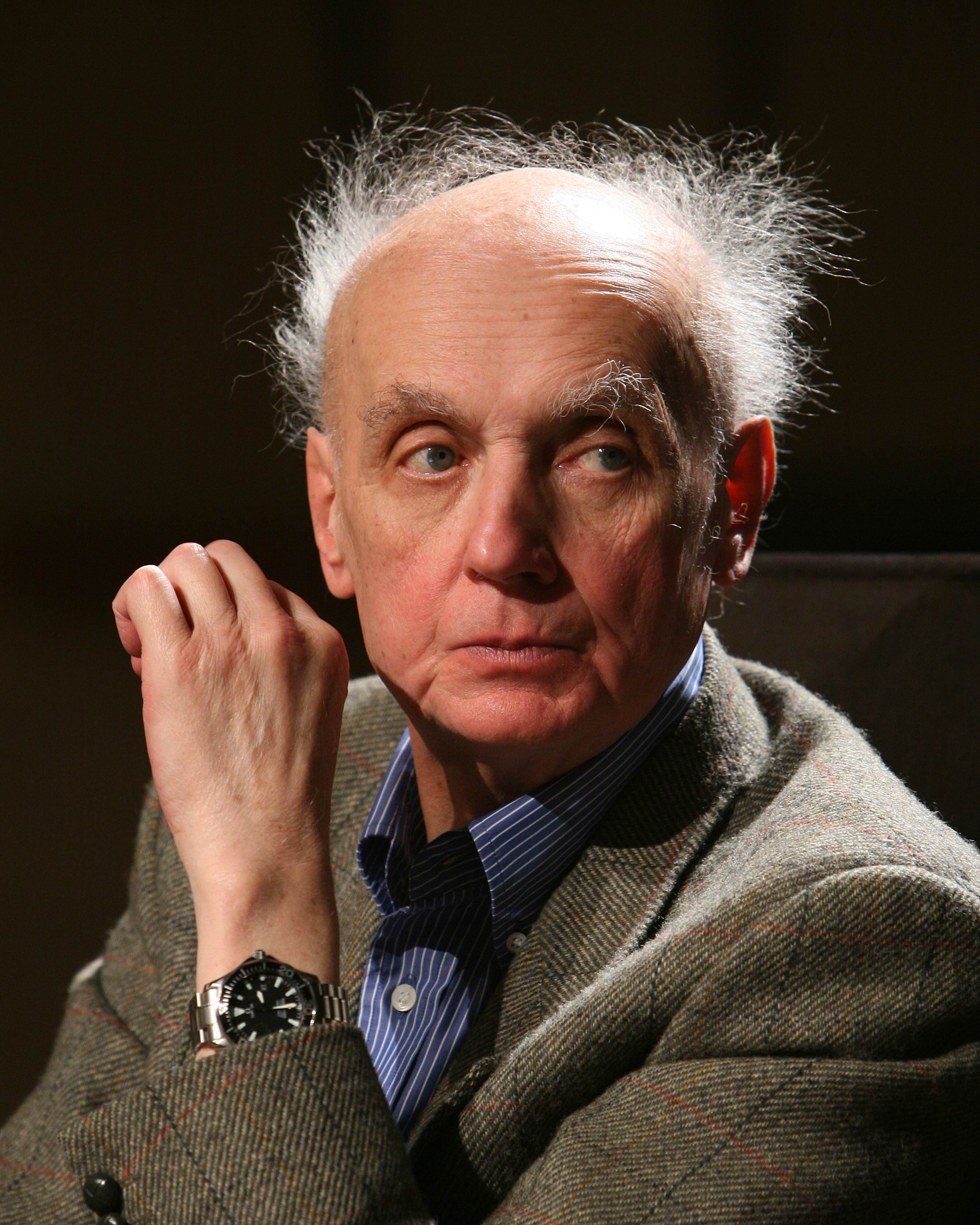
- The composer in 2006
- Composed: 2007
- Dedication: Silesian Philharmonic
- Performed: 16 November 2007: Katowice
- Duration: 41:49
- Movements: Four

Premiere
- Conductor: Mirosław Jacek Błaszczyk

The Symphony No. 5 also known as the Advent Symphony (Polish: V Symfonia „Adwentowa”) is a symphony in four movements by Wojciech Kilar.

The 5th Symphony was commissioned by the Silesian Philharmonic based in Katowice. When composing, the author referred to the musical tradition of Silesia. Two melodies sung in this area during Advent were introduced to the score: Catholic Polish Jezu, Jezu do mnie przyjdź and Protestant German Herr, send herab uns deinen Sohn. The theme of the liturgical cry in Latin also returns in the symphony: Veni, Domine Iesu!. The work was completed in 2007. In the first and fourth movements, the composer introduced a choir. The world premiere took place in Katowice on November 16, 2007. The orchestra of Silesian Philharmonic was conducted by Mirosław Jacek Błaszczyk.

The movements are

1. Larghetto meditativo
2. Largo religiosamente
3. Andante solennemente
4. Largo supplichevolmente
