= Symphony No. 21 (Weinberg) =

Symphony by Mieczysław Weinberg

The Symphony No. 21, Opus 152, subtitled Kaddish, was composed by Mieczysław Weinberg in 1991. It was the last full-orchestral symphony that Weinberg completed (he died in 1996, leaving his 22nd symphony unorchestrated). The work is dedicated to the Warsaw Ghetto's Holocaust victims. It has a quotation from Frederyk Chopins Ballade in G minor, and also features klezmer music and a violin solo, referring to the composers father, a violinist. Almost all of his family perished in the ghetto.

The symphony is a single-movement work in six sections:

1. Largo (This section quotes from Chopin's Ballade No. 1.)
2. Allegro molto
3. Largo
4. Presto
5. Andantino
6. Lento (This section introduces a soprano singing a wordless requiem.)

The symphony is scored for the following forces: 3 flutes, 3 oboes, 3 clarinets, 2 saxophones, 3 bassoons, 6 horns, 4 trumpets, 4 trombones, tuba, timpani, 4 percussionists (2 triangles, 2 woodblocks, whip, ratchet, tambourine, snare drum, bass drum, cymbals, tam-tam, low bell in C), harp, piano (doubling celesta), harmonium, soprano singer and strings.

The symphony was first recorded in 2014, by the Siberian Symphony Orchestra (conducted by Dmitry Vasilyev) on the Toccata Classics label. The Symphony has also been recorded in 2019 by the City of Birmingham Symphony Orchestra and Kremerata Baltica conducted by Mirga Gražinytė-Tyla on Deutsche Grammophon.
