= The Pianist (soundtrack) =

The Pianist: Music from the Motion Picture

Soundtrack album by Wojciech Kilar
- Released: 2002
- Recorded: John Timperley (sound engineer)
- Genre: Soundtrack
- Label: Sony

The Pianist: Music from the Motion Picture is the original soundtrack, on the Sony Classical label, of the 2002 film The Pianist starring Adrien Brody, Thomas Kretschmann, and Frank Finlay. The Frédéric Chopin pieces were played by Polish pianist Janusz Olejniczak and the original score piece was composed by Wojciech Kilar. The music in the actual movie also includes pieces by Ludwig van Beethoven, Chopin, and Johann Sebastian Bach.

In 2003, the music won the César Award for Best Music Written for a Film, and was also nominated for the BAFTA Award for Best Original Music (but lost to the music of The Hours).

== Track listing ==
All music is composed by Frédéric Chopin, unless otherwise stated.

No.	Title	Music	Length
1.	"Nocturne in C-sharp Minor (1830)"		4:12
2.	"Nocturne in E Minor, Op. 72, No. 1"		4:31
3.	"Nocturne in C Minor, Op. 48, No. 1"		5:57
4.	"Ballade No. 2 in F Major, Op. 38"		7:41
5.	"Ballade No. 1 in G Minor, Op. 23"		9:01
6.	"Waltz No. 3 in A Minor, Op. 34, No. 2"		5:13
7.	"Prelude in E Minor, Op. 28, No. 4"		2:34
8.	"Andante spianato in G Major"		4:28
9.	"Grande Polonaise brillante in E-flat major"		9:31
10.	"Moving to the Ghetto Oct. 31, 1940"	Wojciech Kilar	1:52
11.	"Mazurka in A Minor, Op. 17, No. 4"		3:42
12.	"Moonlight Sonata Movement 1, Opus 27 no.2"	Ludwig van Beethoven
