= Exodus (Kilar) =

Orchestral work by Wojciech Kilar

Exodus is a composition for choir and orchestra written between 1979 and 1981 by the Polish composer Wojciech Kilar. The score is based on the eponymous story from the Biblical Book of Exodus and is set to a Latin text. Its world premiere was given at the Warsaw Autumn festival on 19 September 1981. The piece remains one of Kilar's most famous concert works and has been recorded multiple times.

== Composition ==
Exodus is cast in a single movement and has a duration of about 22 minutes. It is based on a single, Jewish-themed melody—itself built upon a descending seven-note phrase—that repeats eight times throughout the work in different instrumental combinations. Due to this repetitive structure, the piece has often been compared to Maurice Ravel's Boléro, to which Kilar made deliberate allusions.

== Reception ==
Critical response to Exodus has been heavily divided since its premiere. Fellow composer Krzysztof Penderecki complimented the work as a "tiptop... Kosher Boléro" and Kilar regarded it as one of his most successful works. Christopher Thomas of MusicWeb International described the piece as "strikingly imaginative in its use of orchestral resources" and wrote, "It is not until late in the work after a brass led, martial like climax that there is a change in the momentum, the choir entering with rapid biblical exclamations before the word Domine is repeated with increasing intensity, over the top of which trumpets reintroduce the original theme. The choir then take up the theme and drive the work to a triumphant conclusion."

Reviewing the work on album alongside Kilar's Angelus, however, Gramophone described it as "rather too crudely cinematic to be completely convincing (I find the closing crowd scene of Exodus little short of farcical) and both overstay their welcome: the 19-minute orchestral introduction to Exodus‚ based entirely on a seven-note melody‚ is the nearest thing I've ever heard to Ravel's Boléro: apart‚ that is‚ from Ravel's Boléro itself." Andrew Clements of BBC Music Magazine was similarly critical of the work, remarking that "the range of effects is wide – from syllabic chanting to melodic lines that strive for a Górecki-like spirituality, though bombast is never far away. Unremarkable music, then, unremarkably performed."
