= Maria Koterbska =

Polish singer (1924–2021)

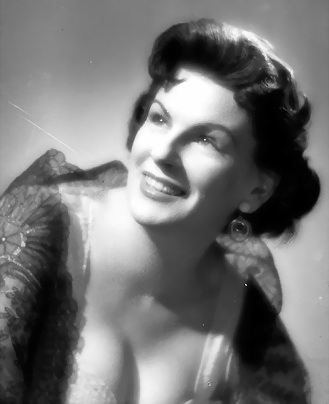
- Maria Koterbska during the 1950s
- Born: Maria Koterbska; 13 July 1924; Biała, Poland
- Died: 18 January 2021 (aged 96)
- Occupations: Singer; songwriter
- Spouse: Jan Frankl (m. 1950; died 2020)
- Children: 1, Roman Frankl (b. 1954)
- Musical career
- Genres: swing, jazz
- Instrument: Vocal
- Years active: 1949–2013

Maria Koterbska (13 July 1924 – 18 January 2021) was a Polish singer who was particularly popular in the 1950s and 1960s. Her biggest hits include Augustowskie noce, Brzydula i rudzielec, Karuzela, Parasolki, Serduszko puka w rytmie cza cza, Wrocławska piosenka, and Do grającej szafy grosik wrzuć.

== Career ==
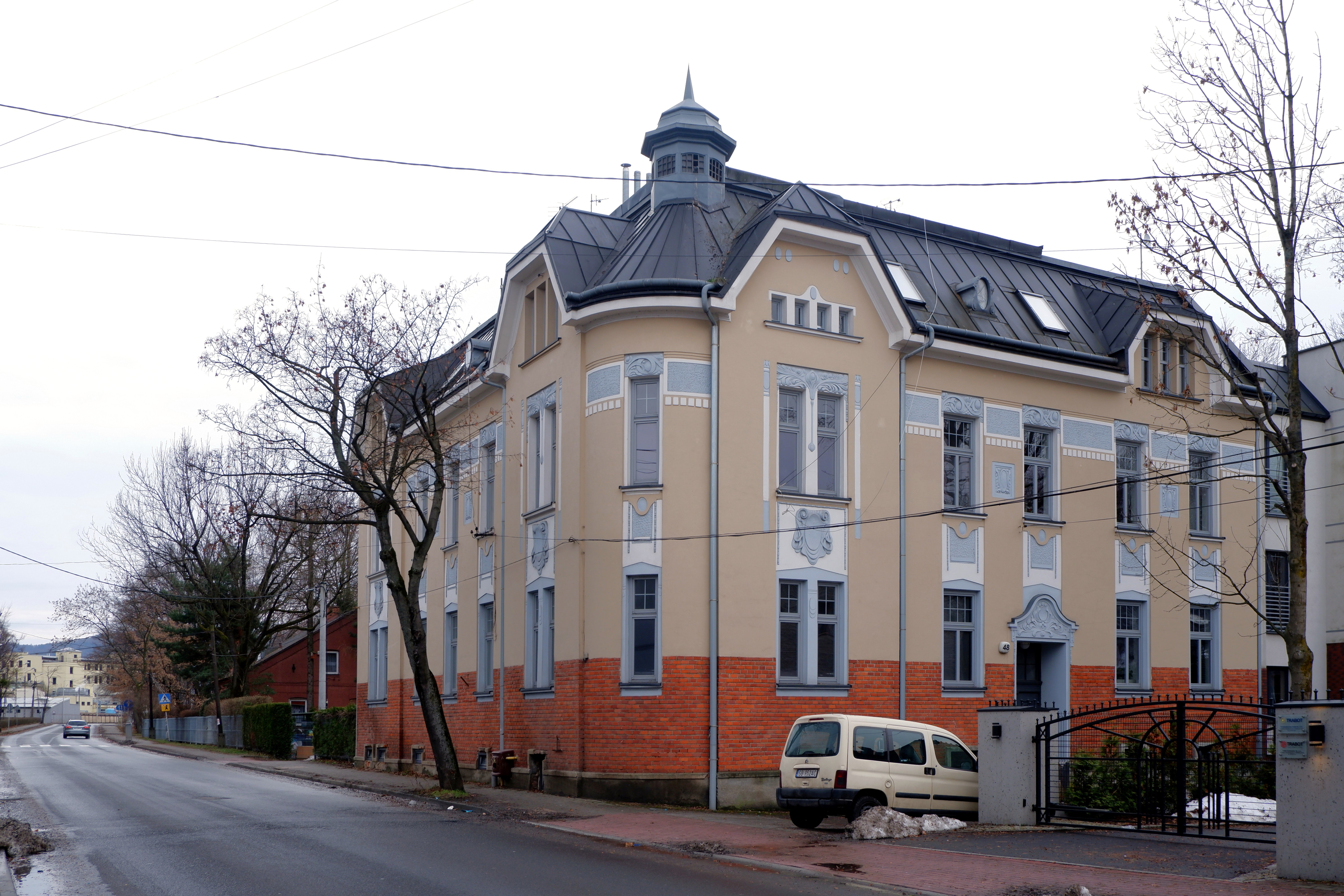
House in Bielsko-Biała (48 Sempołowskiej Street) where Koterbska lived

She made her debut on New Year's Eve 1949. In the 1950s, she became a regular guest on the Sunday broadcast of Radio Katowices Melodie świata broadcast, which became the most popular by her performances. In the mid-50s, she appeared at the Satirical Theatre in Kraków. These two years in the theater performances were of great importance for the development of her career, helping to change her repertoire - from jazz to theatre songs- which required a slightly different handling of the voice. From this period on, she remained extremely popular with the song Wio koniku. Most of the recordings from this period were destroyed, but their footprint can be found in Wiązance przebojów z lat pięćdziesiątych in November 1967, the creation of which helped launch the careers of Wojciech Młynarski and Tomasz Śpiewak. Her success can be attributed to the composer and arranger Jerzy Harald, who composed, among others, the song "Brzydula i rudzielec".

Starting from 1956, Koterbska worked with Kabaret Wagabunda. Through all the years of existence in all programs, she was their first star, with cabaret concerts in Europe, and also for the Polish community in the United States. From this period they have recorded cabarets such as "Bajka amurska", "Jesteś tu", "Piosenka o walcu domino" and many others, performing with other artists such as Lidia Wysocka, Jacek Fedorowicz, Mieczysław Wojnicki, Bogumił Kobiela, and Mieczysław Czechowicz. The arranger and musical director of the band, with which Maria Koterbska sang, was initially Wiktor Kolankowski and later Tomasz Spiewak, with whom the partnership lasted the longest.

In between performances with Wagabunda, she participated in the events, entertainers, domestic and foreign. She sang in the "Zgaduj zgadula", "Podwieczorek przy mikrofonie", and many other broadcasts. In 1961, she toured the Soviet Union. The artistic ensemble, under the direction of Kazimierz Rudzki, was the first Polish band to appear before the Soviet audience. Koterbska was well received. In 1963, she was invited to participate in the Sopot Festival. She sang with Marek Sart to the words of Jerzy Miller's Odejdź smutku and earned second place. The performance in Sopot was a surprise for many, as she was known previously as a performer of popular hits. In Sopot, she unveiled the new face of artistic interpreter of songs as difficult and challenging.

In the 1970s, she recorded two LPs and also appeared in KFPP in Opole and participated in entertainment programs. During the 1980s, she sat on the jury for the KFPP. In 1987, she received the Honorary Grand Prix at the festival. She performed at the Festival of Soviet Songs in Zielona Góra. At the end of the 70s, she performed together with her son, actor Roman Frankl, who was not only a performer, but also a composer of her songs. In 2007, she took part in a concert dedicated entirely to Jacek Lech.

She appeared in the films A Matter to Settle and Irena do domu!.

In February 2013, the Salon of Fine Varied Basilisk Bielsko Art Cellar in Bielsko-Biała was established under the patronage of Koterbska. From November 2013 BPA moved its operations to the cafe "At the Stage."

In 1999, Koterbska was awarded the Officer's Cross of the Order of Polonia Restituta.

== Personal life ==
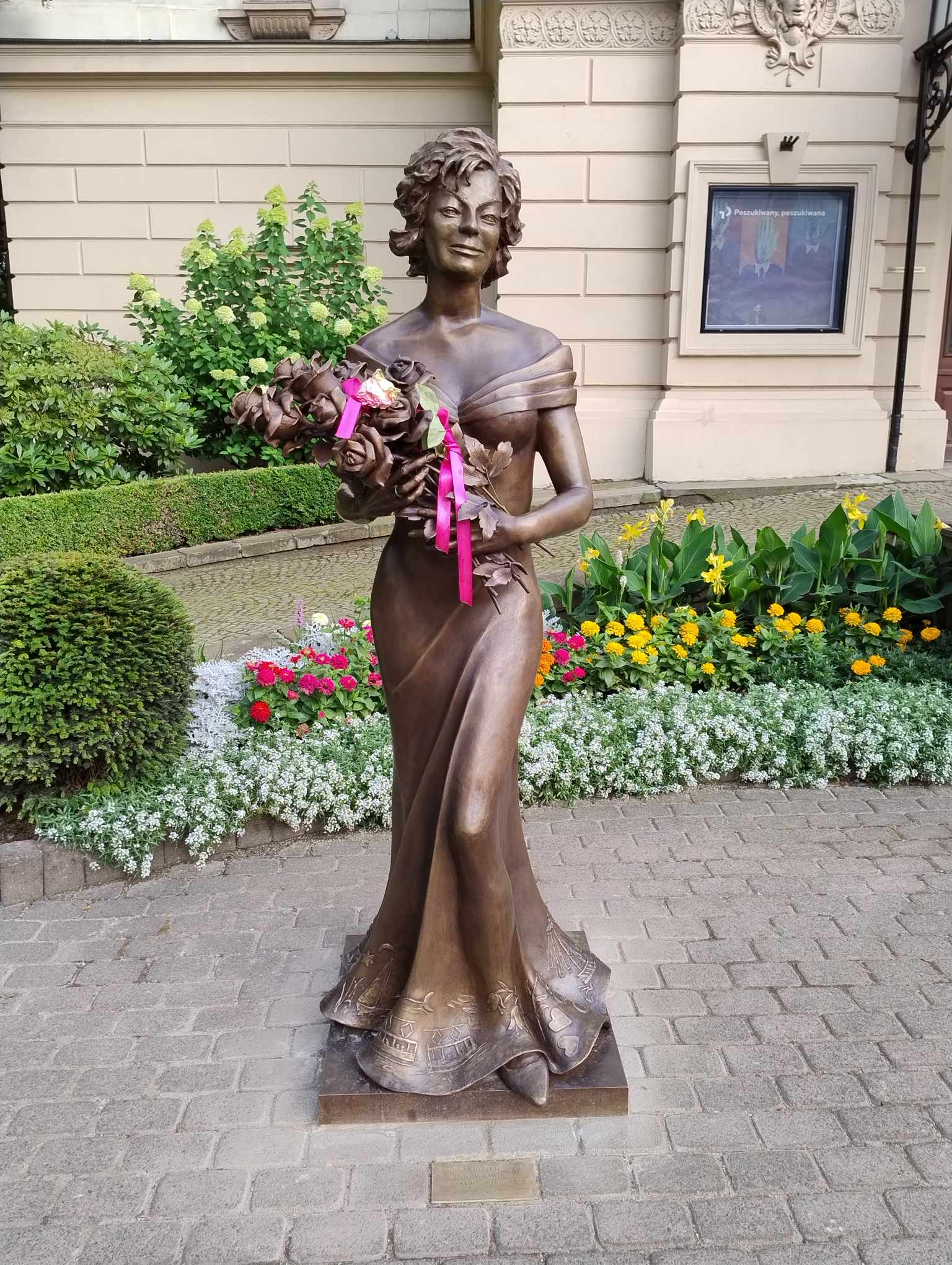
Monument of Maria Koterbska in Bielsko-Biała, unveiled in 2024

Koterbska was born in July 1924 in Bielsko, Poland.

Her husband was Jan Frankl, and their son is actor and singer Roman Frankl.

She died in Bielsko-Biała, Poland on 18 January 2021 at the age of 96.

== Songs ==
- „Asmodeusz” (muz. Bogusław Klimczuk, sł. Tadeusz Urgacz)
- „Augustowskie noce” (muz. Franciszka Leszczyńska, sł. Andrzej Tylczyński i Zbigniew Zapert)
- „Brzydula i rudzielec” (muz. Jerzy Harald, sł. Eugenia Wnukowska)
- „Chłopcy z obcych mórz” (muz. Ryszard Sielicki, sł. Andrzej Bianusz)
- „Cowboy Jackie” (muz. Adam Markiewicz, sł. Andrzej Tylczyński)
- „Deszcz” (muz. Jerzy Wasowski, sł. Jeremi Przybora)
- „Do grającej szafy grosik wrzuć" (muz. Günter Oppenheimer, sł. Mirosław Łebkowski)
- „Dziś nie wiem, kto to jest” (muz. Roman Orłow, sł. Andrzej Bianusz)
- „Hallo, hallo, hallo, hallo” (muz. Adam Markiewicz, sł. Andrzej Tylczyński)
- „Karuzela” (muz. Witold Krzemiński, sł. Ludwik Starski)
- „Klip klip, klap klap” (muz. Adam Markiewicz, sł. Andrzej Tylczyński)
- „Mój chłopiec piłkę kopie” (muz. Jerzy Harald, sł. Eugenia Wnukowska)
- „Nie mówimy, że to miłość” (muz. Camillo Bargoni, Al Stillman, sł. Jeremi Przybora)
- „Nie o mnie” (muz. Marian Radzik, sł. Marian Załucki)
- „Serduszko puka w rytmie cza cza” (muz. Romuald Żyliński, sł. Janusz Odrowąż-Wiśniewski)
- „Si senor” (muz. Ryszard Sielicki, sł. Kazimierz Winkler)
- „Zakochałam się w zielonych oczach” (muz. Adam Markiewicz, sł. Andrzej Tylczyński)

== Discography ==
- 1960 – Maria Koterbska śpiewa wesołe piosenki
- 1960 – Ulubione przeboje
- 1960 – Ulubione piosenki
- 1967 – Nie mówmy, że to miłość
- 1972 – Maria Koterbska
- 1974 – Jubileusz
- 1980 – Maria Koterbska
- 1990 – Życie zdarza się raz
- 2010 – 40 Piosenek Marii Koterbskiej

== Filmography ==
- 1948 – Skarb (jako piosenkarka)
- 1953 – Sprawa do załatwienia (wykonawczyni piosenki)
- 1955 – Irena do domu! (jako piosenkarka)

== Publications about Maria Koterbska ==
- Frankl, Roman (2008). Maria Koterbska: Karuzela mojego życia. ISBN 978-83-06-03159-1.
