= Andrzej Tylczyński =

Andrzej Tylczyński (1 January 1925, Poznań, Poland – 11 July 2009, Best, Netherlands) was a Polish songwriter, journalist, writer, lyricist, and satirist.

== Biography ==
His family was already in the entertainment business, as his father was an actor at the Polish Theatre in Poznań. He studied medicine and economics in Poznan (founded the cabaret Żarty z karty), and in the early 1950s, he moved to Warsaw. In his youth, he worked at Głos Wielkopolski and the Democratic Weekly. From 1949 to 1950, he was the chairman of the Poznań branch of the Alliance of Democrats. In 1972, he founded the magazine Non Stop, becoming its editor-in-chief. In 1979, he documented the pilgrimage of Pope John Paul II to Poland (for PolyGram International).

Until his death he lived in the Netherlands. His son, Piotr Tylko-Tylczyński, a composer, creates, among others, electronic music, film and music accompaniments to films, radio plays and commercials.

== Literary works ==
His achievements as a writer consists of several hundred lyrics performed, among others, by: Czesław Niemen, Piotr Szczepanik, Anna German, Irena Santor, Maria Koterbska, Ada Rusowicz, Bohdan Łazuka, Ludmiła Jakubczak, Irena Jarocka, and Maciej Kossowski.

== Songs ==
- "Augustowskie noce" (Music: Franciszka Leszczyńska, Lyrics: Andrzej Tylczyński and Zbigniew Zapert; performed by Maria Koterbska & Hanna Rek)
- "Hallo, hallo, hallo, hallo" (Music: Adam Markiewicz; performed by Maria Koterbska)
- "Klip klip, klap klap" Music: Adam Markiewicz; performed by Maria Koterbska)
- "Kochać" (Music: Andrzej Korzyński; performed by Piotr Szczepanik)
- "Najtrudniejsze są chwile pożegnań" (Music: Wojciech Piętowski; performed by Irena Santor)
- "Nie pozwól mi" (Music and performed by Maciej Kossowski)
- "Nie wróci taki dzień" (Music and performed by Maciej Kossowski)
- "Saga o cygance Darii" (Music and performed by Maciej Kossowski)
- "Nigdy więcej" (Music: Wojciech Piętowski; performed by Piotr Szczepanik)
- "Jesteś moją miłością" (Music: Jerzy Abratowski; performed by Anna German)
- "Goniąc kormorany" (Music: Jerzy Woy-Wojciechowski; performed by Piotr Szczepanik)
- "Motylem jestem" (Music: Andrzej Korzyński; performed by Irena Jarocka)
- "Domek bez adresu" (Music: Andrzej Korzyński; performed by Czesław Niemen)
- "Dzisiaj, jutro, zawsze" (Music: Wojciech Piętowski; performed by Bohdan Łazuka)
- "Znad białych wydm" (Music: Marek Sart; performed by Fryderyka Elkana)
- "Zakochałam się w zielonych oczach" (Music: Adam Markiewicz; performed by Ludmiła Jakubczak)
- "Czekam na miłość" (Music: Andrzej Korzyński; performed by Ada Rusowicz)
- "Dzień niepodobny do dnia" (Music: Ryszard Sielicki; performed by Piotr Szczepanik)
- "Pożegnaj mnie dziewczyno" (Music: Andrzej Korzyński; performed by Grupa ABC)
- "W zielonym zoo" (Music: Jan Czekalla; performed by Ludmiła Jakubczak)

In 1975, Tylczyński released an album: Goniąc kormorany i inne piosenki A. Tylczyńskiego.

== Publications ==
- Kryptonim – Jeździec Polski. Warszawa, Wyd. Polcopress, [1976, 1985], 213 s.

He is also the author of the novel, the libretto of musicals, musical comedies and numerous scenarios for television programs.
