= Gerard Wilk =

Polish artist (1944–1995)

- Born: 12 January 1944; Gliwice
- Died: 28 August 1995 (aged 51); Paris
- Style: ballet, contemporary dance

Gerard Wilk (12 January 1944, Gliwice - 28 August 1995, Paris) – Polish dancer, the soloist of Warsaw Grand Theatre ballet from 1966 to 1970, member of Ballet of the 20th Century.

== Life ==
=== Early life ===
He was born in Gliwice to Jadwiga and Jan/Hans Wilk. He was raised by a single mother, with his father drafted into the German army, and after the war, exiled to Siberia until 1949 for being a member of Wehrmacht. Gerard had a brother, Jan, who was four years older. At the age of 13, he took the exams for the Bytom Ballet School. He was admitted on a probationary period for a year. During this time, he had to catch up three years worth of craft under Halina Hulanicka, who studied dance under Isadora Duncan in Paris. Wilk not only successfully dealt with the backlog, but also discovered a life passion, and years later became an icon of Polish ballet.

=== Career ===
Hulanicka persuaded Wilk to move to the Warsaw ballet school. When he passed his final exams there in 1964, he already had dance employment. He climbed all the way in the ballet hierarchy: from a member of the corps de ballet to the coryphée. In 1968, he joined the troupe of the Warsaw Grand Theater (now Polish National Ballet), where he became a soloist in 1970. Wilk was appreciated by critics and the public. Performances with his participation became mass events. The critics wrote that he was an individuality, attracted attention, that one could admire both the mastery with which he performs the dance, and at the same time, the spontaneity, the ability to convey emotions. 26 June 1970 was his last Warsaw performance, Romeo and Juliet premiere, after which he moved abroad.

He was photographed by Barbara Hoff in fashion photo-shoots for „Przekrój” magazine, starred in music videos and TV entertainment shows. He played a dancer in Stanisław Bareja comedies – Marriage of Convenience (1966) and Przygoda z piosenką (1968) and a legal spokesman of an insurance company in Andrzej Wajda sci-fi comedy Przekładaniec (1968). He became countrywide famous after performing (with Krystyna Mazurówna) in TV-aired music video of Piotr Szczepanik song „Kochać” (1967). He played in ballet-themed short films: Fantomy (1967, choreo Krystyna Mazurówna), Gry (1970) and Podróż magiczna (1979, choreo Zofia Rudnicka). Gry, choreographed by Conrad Drzewiecki earned awards on Prix Italia 1970 and Polish Short Film Festival in 1971. He also performed in ballet etudes of Krzysztof Komeda.

From 1970, he stayed abroad, unable to return for years because of passport problems. Until 1981, he performed in the Maurice Béjart's Ballet of the 20th Century in Brussels. In 1981, he decided to end his stage career. He moved to Paris and started teaching there in 1989. He also taught dance in Munich, Berlin, Florence and Monte Carlo. Once a year, he came to train dancers at the Warsaw's Grand Theatre, where he staged Massenet's opera Werther in the fall of 1994. In 1995, he appeared as the title character in the documentary film Gerard Wilk - kilka razy zaczynałem od zera (Gerard Wilk - I started from scratch several times), directed by Bogdan Łoszewski.

=== Private life ===
In the 60s, Wilk briefly dated Spanish theatre scenographer Fabià Puigserver, then living in Poland. Two men remained lifelong friends until Puigserver's death. From August 1968, he shortly dated then 23 year old actor Marek Barbasiewicz, for several months. His longtime partner was the painter Jean-Jacques Le Corre.

=== Death ===
He died on August 28, 1995, as a result of HIV/AIDS complications. He kept the fact of the HIV infection a secret even from his closest friends. The farewell ceremony took place at the Père Lachaise Cemetery, there was no burial. The urn with the ashes was taken to his estate near Paris by Jean-Jacques Le Corre.
