= Ignacy Machowski =

Polish actor

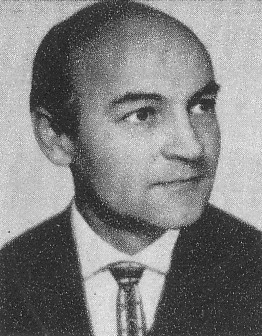
- Ignacy Machowski circa 1965
- Born: 5 July 1920; Rzeszów, Podkarpackie, Poland
- Died: 11 January 2001 (aged 80); Warsaw, Mazowieckie
- Occupation: Actor
- Years active: 1954–1999

Ignacy Machowski (5 July 1920 – 11 January 2001) was a Polish actor. He appeared in more than fifty films from 1954 to 1999.

== Filmography ==
Year	Title	Role	Notes
1954	Niedaleko Warszawy	Secretary	
1955	Irena do domu!	Zygmunt, a barber	
1956	Shadow	Biskupik	
1956	Tajemnica dzikiego szybu	School supervisor	Uncredited
1957	Noose	Prosecutor	
1958	Eroica	Major	(segment "Scherzo alla Polacca")
1958	Noose	Sergeant	
1958	Co rekne zena?	Michalski	
1958	Ashes and Diamonds	Waga	
1959	Night Train	Passenger	
1959	The Eagle	Boatswain Mirta	
1960	First Spaceship on Venus	Polnischer Chefingenieur / Prof. Saltyk / Prof. Durand	
1960	Szklana góra	Florczak	
1961	Historia wspólczesna	Engineer Borkowski	Uncredited
1961	Przeciwko bogom	Major	
1961	Historia zóltej cizemki	mistrz Pawel	
1962	Jutro premiera	profesor Marceli Witting scenograf	
1962	Dom bez okien	Inspector	
1962	The Impossible Goodbye	Francois	(segment "Stary profesor")
1962	Rodzina Milcarków		Narrator
1963	Zbrodniarz i panna	Ens. Szymanski	
1963	Mansarda	Golc	
1964	Ranny w lesie	Major	Narrator
1964	Spotkanie ze szpiegiem	Bernard	
1966	Don Gabriel	Secretary of the Cabinet of President	
1966	Marysia i Napoleon	Géraud Christophe Michel Duroc	
1967	Stawka większa niż życie	Standartenführer Max Dibelius	2 episodes
1970; 1971	Liberation II: Breakthrough; Liberation III: Direction of the Main Blow	The Old Man; Stablesman	
1971	Klopotliwy gosc	Power Station Messenger	
1973	Na krawedzi	Pharmacist	
1976	Kazimierz Wielki	Wladyslaw Lokietek	
1978	Wszyscy i nikt	Konrad	
1978	The Water Babies	Grimes	Polish version, Narrator
1979	Bestia	Kazimierz Rózanski, wuj Pawla	
1979	Pokhishchenie 'Savoi'	Heinrich Scharss	Polish version, Narrator
1980	Wsciekly	Prof. Rembowski	
1980	Ojciec królowej	Marquis d'Arquien	
1988	Gwiazda Piolun	Notary	
1989	Lawa. Opowiesc o 'Dziadach' Adama Mickiewicza	General	
1995	Les Milles	Gustav Kohn	
1995	Kamien na kamieniu	Parish Priest	
1996	Autoportret z kochanka		
1997	Ksiega wielkich zyczen	Stanislaw	
