= The Impossible Goodbye =

1962 Polish film

- Directed by: Stanisław Jędryka
- Written by: Aleksander Ścibor-Rylski
- Starring: Wiesław Gołas
- Cinematography: Czesław Świrta
- Edited by: Czesław Raniszewski
- Release date: May 1962
- Running time: 98 minutes
- Country: Poland
- Language: Polish

Impossible Goodbye (Polish: Dom bez okien) is a 1962 Polish drama film directed by Stanisław Jędryka. It was entered into the 1962 Cannes Film Festival.

== Cast ==
- Wiesław Gołas – Robert Staniewski
- Danuta Szaflarska – Zofia Szarlit
- Józef Kondrat – Director Szarlit
- Elżbieta Czyżewska – Teresa Kwaśnikówna
- Tadeusz Fijewski – Jankowski
- Jan Świderski – Kleberg
- Hanka Bielicka – Korolkiewiczowa
- Bolesław Płotnicki – Korolkiewicz
- Janusz Ziejewski – Żaczek
- Jadwiga Andrzejewska – Ania
- JarosŁaw Skulski – Ogórek
- Ignacy Machowski – Inspector
