= Irena do domu! =

- Directed by: Jan Fethke
- Written by: Joanna Wilińska, Anatol Potemkowski
- Starring: Lidia Wysocka, Adolf Dymsza
- Music by: Witold Krzemieński
- Production companies: Wytwórnia Filmów Fabularnych, Wrocław
- Release date: 26 November 1955 (Poland)
- Running time: 90 minutes
- Country: Poland
- Language: Polish

Irena do domu! (transl. Irene, Go Home!) is a 1955 Polish comedy film directed by Jan Fethke.

== Cast ==
- Lidia Wysocka − Irena Majewska
- Adolf Dymsza − Zygmunt Majewski
- Michał Kiliński − Janek Majewski, their son
- Helena Buczyńska − Nowakowa
- Ludwik Sempoliński − Kotowski
- Hanka Bielicka − Kwiatkowska
- Kazimierz Brusikiewicz − Miecio
- Maria Koterbska − singer
- Zofia Perczyńska − Krystyna
- Włodzimierz Skoczylas − Władek
- Bronisław Darski − Banasik
- Michał Gazda
- Stanisław Jaworski
- Irena Brodzińska
- Urszula Hałacińska
- Barbara Jakubowska
- Irena Skwierczyńska
- Stefan Witas
- Stanisław Woliński
- Henryk Hunko
- Stanisław Igar
- Ignacy Machowski
- Tadeusz Schmidt
- Józef Pieracki
