= Bogumił Kobiela =

Polish actor

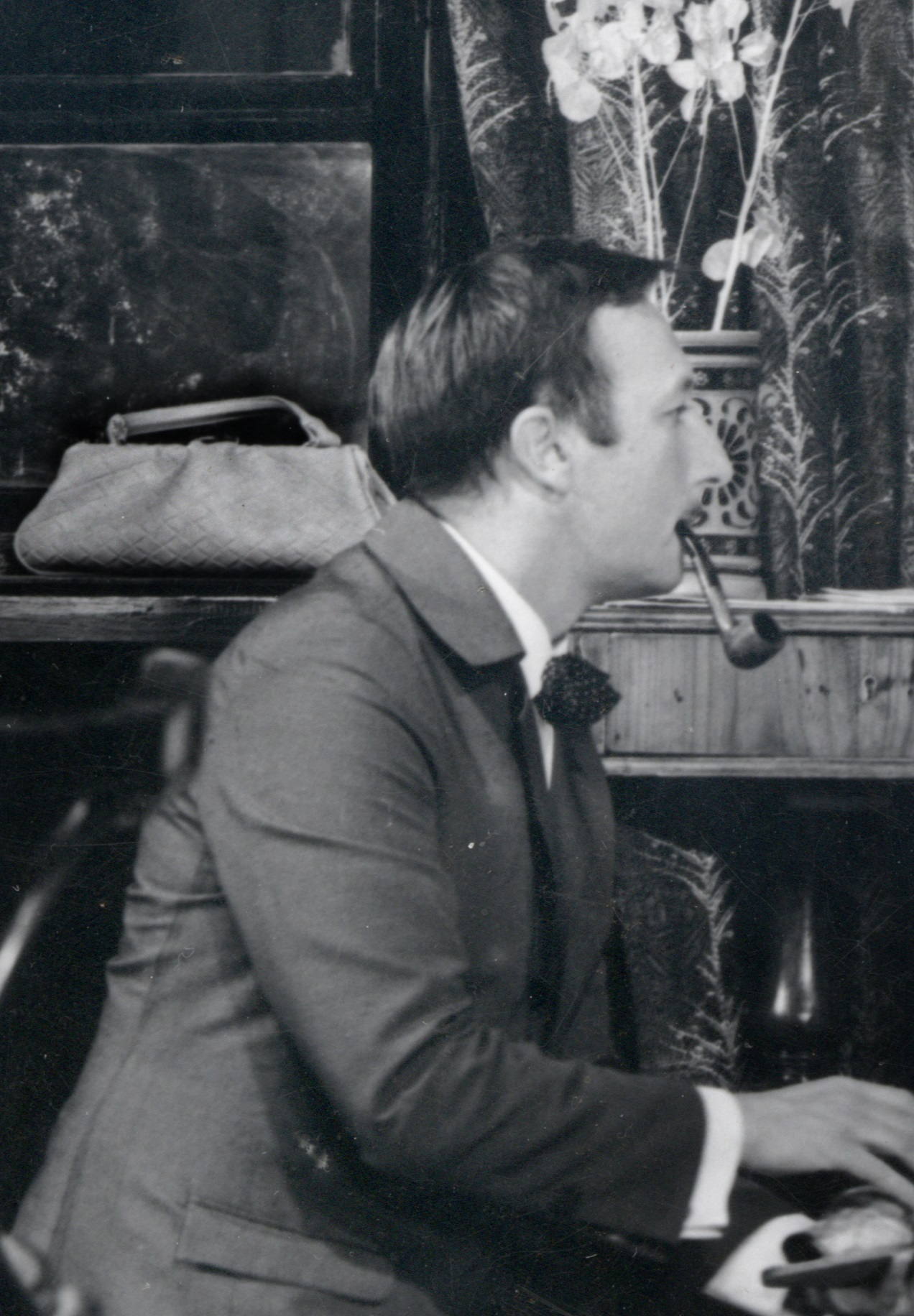
- Born: 31 May 1931; Katowice, Poland
- Died: 10 July 1969 (aged 38); Gdańsk, Poland
- Occupation: Actor
- Years active: 1953–1969

Bogumił Kobiela (31 May 1931 – 10 July 1969) was a Polish stage and film actor. He is best known for his performances as Drewnowski in Andrzej Wajda's 1958 drama film Ashes and Diamonds and as Jan Piszczyk in Andrzej Munk's black comedy film Bad Luck (1960).

== Accident and Death ==
He suffered serious injuries in a car crash on 2 July 1969 in Buszkowo. He died eight days later in hospital in Gdańsk.

== Selected filmography ==
Kobiela appeared among other in the following films:

- Szkice węglem (1957)
- Ashes and Diamonds (1958)
- Heroism (1958)
- Bad Luck (1960)
- Goodbye to the Past (1960)
- Zacne grzechy (1963)
- The Saragossa Manuscript (1965)
- Three Steps on Earth (1965)
- Małżeństwo z rozsądku (1966)
- Człowiek z M-3 (1968)
- Przekładaniec (1968)
- The Doll (1968)
- Everything for Sale (1969)
- Nowy (1969)
- Hands Up! (released in 1985, shot in 1967)
