= Przygoda z piosenką =

- DVD cover for Przygoda z piosenką
- Directed by: Stanisław Bareja
- Written by: Jerzy Jurandot; Stanisław Bareja
- Starring: Pola Raksa; Bohdan Łazuka
- Cinematography: Franciszek Kądziołka
- Music by: Marek Sart
- Release date: 27 June 1969
- Running time: 93 minutes
- Language: Polish

Przygoda z piosenką (Pol. Adventure with song) is a Polish musical comedy from 1969 directed by Stanisław Bareja.

== Cast ==
- Bohdan Łazuka – Piotr
- Zdzisław Maklakiewicz – Drybek
- Pola Raksa – Mariola Brońska
- Barbara Krafftówna – madame Michaud
- Czesław Wołłejko – impresario Cox
- Urszula Modrzyńska – Cox' girl
- Irena Szewczyk – Cox' girl
- Ryszard Nawrocki – composer Waldemar
- Irena Santor – Suzanne Blanche AKA Zuzanna Białko
- Maciej Grzybowski – Michel
- Gerard Wilk – dancer
