= Landscape After the Battle =

1970 Polish film

- DVD release poster
- Directed by: Andrzej Wajda
- Written by: Tadeusz Borowski; Andrzej Brzozowski; Andrzej Wajda
- Starring: Daniel Olbrychski
- Cinematography: Zygmunt Samosiuk
- Edited by: Halina Prugar-Ketling
- Release date: 8 September 1970
- Running time: 101 minutes
- Country: Poland
- Language: Polish

Landscape After the Battle (Polish: Krajobraz po bitwie) is a 1970 Polish drama film directed by Andrzej Wajda and starring Daniel Olbrychski; telling a story of a Nazi German concentration camp survivor soon after liberation, residing in a DP camp somewhere in Germany. It is based on the writings of Holocaust survivor and Polish author Tadeusz Borowski. In most part, the plot revolves around the events depicted in Borowski's short story called "Bitwa pod Grunwaldem" ("The Battle of Grunwald") from his collection This Way for the Gas, Ladies and Gentlemen. The film was entered into the 1970 Cannes Film Festival.

== Plot ==
The Landscape After the Battle film tells a story of two young concentration camp survivors. In the opening sequence, Vivaldi's “Autumn” can be heard while the prisoners are liberated. A young Polish poet, Tadeusz, is asked by a pretty Jewish girl, Nina, to go with her to the West. His camp experience, however, prevents him from realizing the depth of her love for him, and he is reluctant to commit. Nina is accidentally shot dead by an American soldier, causing Tadeusz to cry for the first time in years. The shock of her death brings back the world of feelings suppressed by his Nazi captors, and allows for his original creativity to reemerge. The credits appear to the sound of Vivaldi's “Winter”.

== Cast ==
- Daniel Olbrychski - Tadeusz
- Stanisława Celińska - Nina
- Aleksander Bardini - Professor
- Tadeusz Janczar - Karol
- Zygmunt Malanowicz - Priest
- Mieczysław Stoor - Ensign
- Leszek Drogosz - Tolek
- Stefan Friedmann - Gypsy
- Jerzy Oblamski - Prisoner
- Jerzy Zelnik - American Commandant
- Małgorzata Braunek - German Girl
- Anna German - American Woman
- Agnieszka Perepeczko - Nina's Friend
- Alina Szpak - German Woman
- Józef Pieracki - Cook

== See also ==
- The Holocaust in Poland
