= Lech Ordon =

Polish actor (1928–2017)

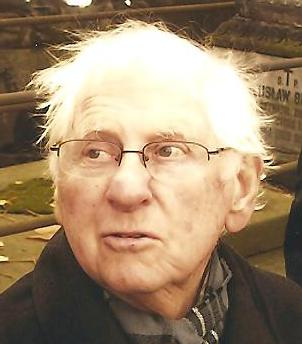
- Lech Ordon in 2013
- Born: November 24, 1928; Poznań, Poland
- Died: October 21, 2017 (aged 88); Warsaw, Poland
- Education: The Aleksander Zelwerowicz National Academy of Dramatic Art in Warsaw
- Occupation: Actor
- Years active: 1948–2017
- Awards: Medal for Merit to Culture – Gloria Artis (2008)

Lech Ordon (24 November 1928, Poznań – 21 October 2017, Warsaw) was a Polish actor.

In 1948, he graduated from The Aleksander Zelwerowicz National Academy of Dramatic Art in Warsaw, at the time located in Łódź. He was known for his roles in Letters to Santa, The Rider on the White Horse, and in Mister Blot's Academy.

In December 2008, on the occasion of 90th anniversary of the Polish Union of Stage Actors, he was awarded the Gold Medal for Merit to Culture – Gloria Artis.

== Death ==
Ordon died on 21 October 2017 at the age of 88.

== Filmography ==
- A Matter to Settle (1953)
- Warsaw Premiere (1961)
