= Przekładaniec =

1968 film by Andrzej Wajda

Przekładaniec is a 1968 short science fiction comedy film directed by Andrzej Wajda based on the screenplay by Stanisław Lem, which was a loose adaptation of Lem's 1955 short story turned into a radio play Czy pan istnieje, Mr. Johns? (translated into English as Are you there, Mr. Jones?). The title of the film has also been translated into English as Layer Cake (literal meaning) and Roly Poly.

The first print of Lem's short story was in Przekrój in 1955. Translated as Are you there, Mr. Jones?, it appeared in a British-Australian science fiction magazine Vision of Tomorrow in 1969. According to the introduction to the story in the magazine, it was the first work of Lem translated into English.

The central idea of the film concerns the problems related to organ transplantation, namely, what is the legal identity (and the associated legal rights) of a person whose body includes many transplants and that of a person whose body was used for many transplants?

The film is a rare example when Lem was pleased with an adaptation of his work. Lem wrote that Wajda's film was the only adaptation of his works which had satisfied him (Lem) completely. Lem even confessed that he had found the course of the events in the film to make more sense than in the short story.

== Plots ==
Wajda's film is the story of two brothers, Richard Fox, rally racer, and his brother Thomas, who had terrible car accidents. In Lem's original work, they were Harry Jones, a racer after series of car accidents, and his unnamed brother, who suffered a plane crash.

=== Radio-play version ===
In this version, the dilemma is posed in the domain of advanced prosthetics bordering with robotics.

Harry Jones has a series of grave accidents. After each accident, Cybernetics Company adds prostheses to his body until virtually all his body, including a half of his brain, becomes artificial and Jones accumulates a huge debt to the company. The company sues him for return of all prostheses, but the lower court rejected the claim because it would be equivalent of killing Jones. The company tricked him into replacing the remaining half-brain and then sued with the demand to acquire Jones as its property in lieu of debt. The court is confronted with the dilemma: if Jones is machine, he/it cannot be sued, otherwise, if he is still a person, he cannot become company's property. Harry called his brother as evidence. However, it turns out the latter is in the same predicament after the plane crash.

=== Film version ===
This version is framed in the domain of transplantology.

Richard Fox badly hits his brother during a race. The surgeon transplants 48.5% of Toms' body into Richard, and a tragicomedy starts. The life insurance company refuses to pay off Tom's benefits, because he is "incompletely deceased". Tom's wife demands Richard either pay for Tom or recognize himself as Tom and "rejoin the family". Richard's lawyer is not helpful.

At the next rally, Richard smashes into his sister-in-law, two more women and a dog.

After the third catastrophic rally, the lawyer tries to tell Fox that he did not manage to do anything yet. However, it turns out that Fox is no longer Fox, but his survived co-driver full of transplants from Fox's body parts.

== Wajda's film ==
The film premiered on 17 August 1968 on Polish Television.

The film was Wajda's first comedy film, first TV production, and only science fiction work.

=== Cast ===
- Bogumił Kobiela as Richard Fox
- Marek Kobiela as Thomas Fox
- Anna Prucnal as Mrs. Fox
- Jerzy Zelnik as Dr. Burton
- Piotr Wysocki as Dr. Benglow, Psychoanalyst
- Tadeusz Pluciński as Pastor
- Ryszard Filipski as Lawyer
- Gerard Wilk as Insurance Company Spokesman
- Witold Dederko as Organ Seller
- Wojciech Rajewski as Man With A Dog
- Rock band Niebiesko-Czarni

=== Awards ===
- "Golden Screen" Award (Złoty Ekran) by Ekran magazine
- Polish Radion and Television Committee awards for director (Wajda) and screenwriter (Lem)
- Special recognition at the 1970 Sitges Film Festival, Spain

== Other adaptations ==
=== Roly Poly ===
Roly Poly is also the title of a 1969 TV play from the BBC Television Thirty-Minute Theatre adapted from Lem's screenplay. It was aired on 15 May 1969, in Series 4, cycle The Victims. The episode recording is missing from the archives. It was adapted by Derek Hoddinott and directed by Michael Hart.

==== Cast ====
- John Alderton – Richard Fox
- Thorley Walters – Marcus Sedden, lawyer
- Dudley Foster – Dr. Burton
- Hugh Latimer – Dr. Banglos, psychoanalyst
- Terence Brady – Mr. Travers, insurance agent
- Elizabeth Bennett – Miss Land

=== Sandwich ===
In 1989, Soviet film director Pyotr Shtein shot a TV play Sandwich (Russian: Бутерброд) based on Lem's screenplay.

==== Cast ====
- Viktor Rakov - Mr. Jones
- Владимир Белоусов - lawyer
- Татьяна Рылеева - lawyer's secretary
- Марина Трошина - insurance agent
- Vera Ivleva - wife of Mr. Jones
- Tatyana Rudina - psychoanalyst
- Sergey Stepanchenko - priest

=== Stage play ===
Polish puppet master and director Krzysztof Rau staged a play entitled "Czy Pan istnieje, Mr Johnes?", which premiered in the Bialystok Puppet Theatre on 5 December 2014. The grotesque story was cast into a grotesque show, enhanced by multimedia effects, weird masks and costumes of the actors, lights, and music. Actor Michał Jarmoszuk rendered the metamorphoses of the protagonist well, with multiple personalities, multigenderness, and even the multi-species body of Mr. Jones.

== Publication history ==
Lem's screenplay was first published in 1968 in film magazine Ekran and included into Lem's 1971 short story collection Bezsenność. The original radio play was published in the 2000 collection Przekładaniec of Lem's scenarios.

Both the screenplay and film plot were translated several times into Russian. The first, abridged, translation of the play (titled "Существуете ли вы, мистер Джонс?") was in 1957, the first full one was in 1958. The plot was translated under several titles: "Слоеный пирог" ["Layered Cake"] (1972, 1979), "Мозаика" ["Mosaic"] (1973), "Бутерброд" ["Sandwich"] (1973)

== See also ==
- Paradox of the heap, which involves gradually changing one thing until it turns into a different thing
- Ship of Theseus, a thought experiment that raises the question of whether an object that has had all of its components replaced remains fundamentally the same object
