= Beata Tyszkiewicz =

Polish actress and television personality

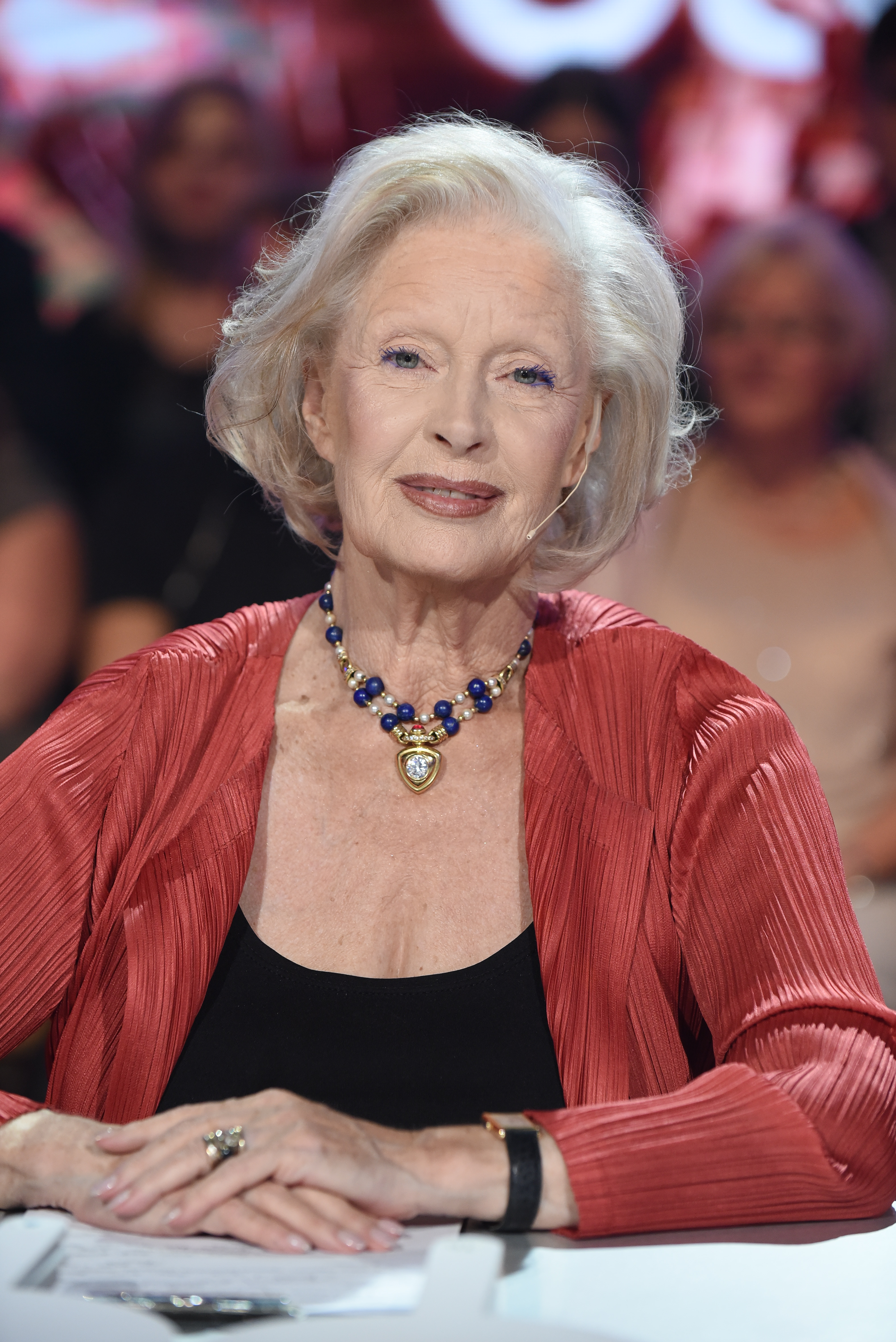
- Born: Beata Maria Helena Tyszkiewicz; 14 August 1938 (age 88); Wilanów, Poland
- Years active: 1956–2018
- Spouses: Andrzej Wajda (m. 1967; div. 1969): Witold Orzechowski; Jacek Padlewski

Beata Maria Helena Tyszkiewicz (born 14 August 1938) is a retired Polish actress and TV personality.

== Career ==
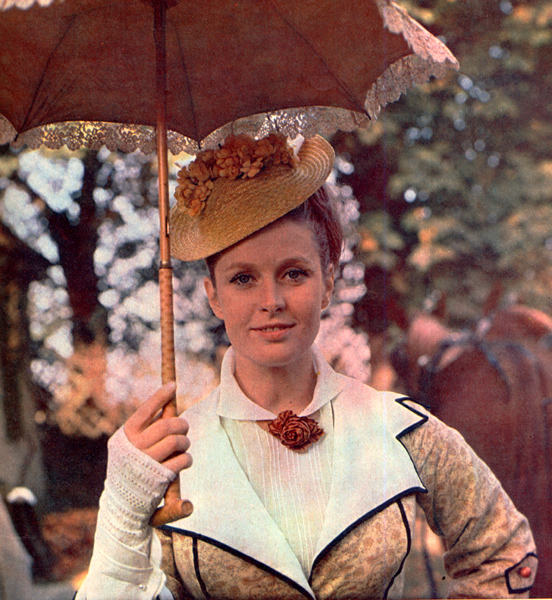
Beata Tyszkiewicz in The Doll (1968)

Beata Tyszkiewicz has worked mostly on the big screen but acted in several French TV movies, becoming famous through her portrayal of distinguished ladies in costume dramas like The Doll by Wojciech Has and The Ashes by Andrzej Wajda. She has worked with leading directors such as Agnieszka Holland, Krzysztof Zanussi, André Delvaux and former husband Andrzej Wajda. Tyszkiewicz has appeared in more than a hundred films.

Her debut was in Zemsta in 1956. In 1968 she was cast in The Doll, directed by Wojciech Has. The Doll was adapted from the Polish novel, Lalka by Boleslaw Prus. In 1971 she was a member of the jury at the 7th Moscow International Film Festival. In 1995 she was awarded with an Honorable Diploma at the 19th Moscow International Film Festival. In 1997 she was a member of the jury at the 20th Moscow International Film Festival.

She was a jury member on Poland's Dancing with the Stars (a.k.a. Taniec z gwiazdami).

In May 2017, she had a massive myocardial infarction. Soon after, she withdrew from public life.

== Personal life ==
Tyszkiewicz is sometimes referred to as the First lady of Polish cinematography, because of her aristocratic roots. Her father was a Count (in Polish Hrabia) Krzysztof Maria Tyszkiewicz and her mother was Barbara Rechowicz of the Leliwa coat of arms. Divorced three times. In the years 1967–1969 she was the wife of Andrzej Wajda. She was also the wife of Witold Orzechowski and Jacek Padlewski. She has two daughters. In 1998 she received her star on Aleja Gwiazd (Stars Avenue) in Łódź.

== Filmography ==
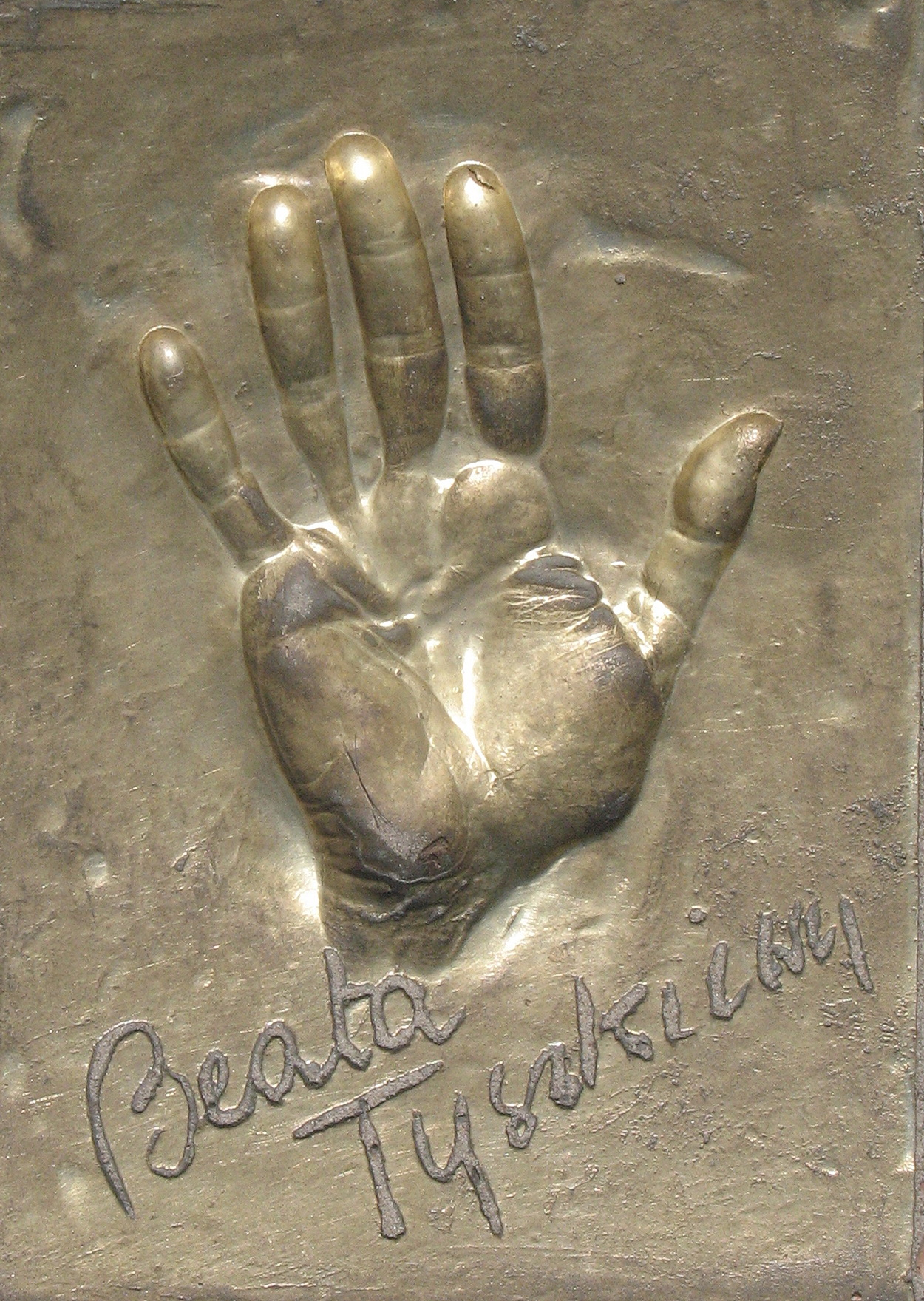
Handprint and signature of B. Tyszkiewicz in Misdroy

- Zemsta (1956)
- Wspólny pokój (1959)
- Szklana góra (1960)
- Dziś w nocy umrze miasto (1961)
- Historia żółtej ciżemki (1961)
- Odwiedziny prezydenta (1961)
- Samson (1961)
- Zaduszki (1961)
- Czarne skrzydła (1962)
- Naprawdę wczoraj (1963)
- Skąpani w ogniu (1963)
- Yokmok (1963)
- Pierwszy dzień wolności (1964)
- Spotkanie ze szpiegiem (1964)
- Rękopis znaleziony w Saragossie (1965)
- Popioły (1965)
- Marysia i Napoleon (1966)
- Pieśń triumfującej miłości (1967)
- Hasło Korn (1968)
- Lalka (1968)
- The Man Who Had His Hair Cut Short (De man die zijn haar kort liet knippen) (1968)
- Stawka większa niż życie (1968)
- Everything for Sale (Wszystko na sprzedaż) (1968)
- Dworianskoje gniezdo (1969)
- Książę sezonu (1970)
- Wielka miłość Balzaka (1973)
- Elective Affinities (Die Wahlverwandtschaften) (1974)
- Dom moich synów (1975)
- Jej powrót (1975)
- Nights and Days (Noce i Dnie) (1975)
- Wieczór u Abdona (1975)
- Polskie drogi (1976)
- Noce i dnie (serial TV, 1977)
- Schach von wuthenow (1977)
- Tańczący jastrząb (1977)
- Sowizdrzał świętokrzyski (1978)
- Niewdzięczność (1979)
- Po drodze (1979)
- Don Juan, Karl-Liebknecht-Str. 78 (1980)
- Kontrakt (1980)
- Mniejsze niebo (1980)
- Najdłuższa wojna nowoczesnej Europy (1981)
- W obronie własnej (1981)
- Édith et Marcel (1983)
- Seksmisja (1983)
- Synteza (1983)
- Les cinq dernieres minutes (1983)
- Jewropejskaja istorija (1984)
- Louisiana (1984)
- Przyspieszenie (1984)
- Vabank II czyli riposta (1984)
- W starym dworku czyli niepodległość trójkątów (1984)
- Les cerfs-volants (1984)
- Sezon na bażanty (1985)
- Ein zimmer mit landschaft (1985)
- Alles auf pique dame (1986)
- Komediantka (1986)
- Bernadette (1987)
- Kingsajz (1987)
- Komediantka (serial TV, 1987)
- Moselbrück (1987)
- Śmieciarz (1987)
- Usmev diabla (1987)
- Deux (1988)
- Dom na głowie (1990)
- Rosamunde (1990)
- Śmierć dziecioroba (1990)
- 30 door key (1991)
- V.I.P. (1991)
- The Silent Touch (1992)
- Piękna nieznajoma (1992)
- La petite apocalypse (1992)
- Le violeur impuni (1992)
- Dinozavris kwertski (1993)
- Dwa księżyce (1993)
- Panna z mokrą głową (1994)
- Panna z mokrą głową (serial TV, 1994)
- Awantura o Basię (serial TV, 1996)
- Dzień wielkiej ryby (1996)
- Ekstradycja 2 (1996)
- Germans (1996)
- Bride of war (1997)
- Sława i chwała (1997)
- 13 posterunek (1998)
- Ekstradycja 3 (1998)
- Złoto dezerterów (1998)
- Krugerandy (1999)
- Trędowata (telenowela, 1999)
- W awguste 44. (1999)
- Anna Karenina (2000)
- Duża przerwa (2000)
- Izabela (2000)
- Zakochani (2000)
- In August of 1944 (2001)
- Paradox Lake (2002)
- Lokatorzy (2003)
- Na dobre i na złe (2003)
- Plebania (2004–2005)
- Magda M. (2006–2007)
- Ryś (2007)
- Nie kłam kochanie (2008)
- Teraz albo nigdy! (2008)
- Zamiana (2009)
- Niania (serial TV, 2009)
- Listy do M. (2011)
- Sprawiedliwy (2015)
- Studniówka (2018)
