= Hanka Bielicka =

Polish singer and actress (1915–2006)

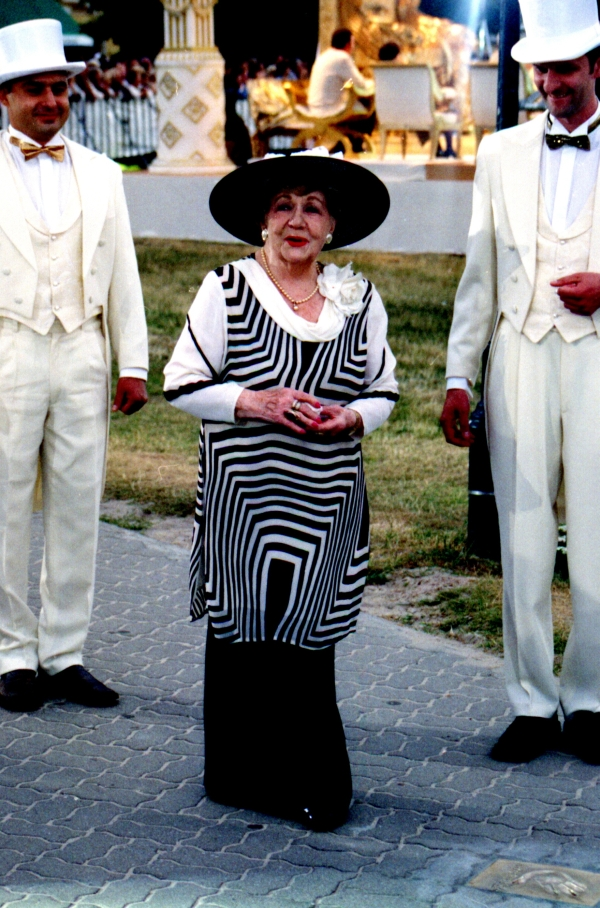

Background information
- Also known as: Hanna; Hanka
- Born: 9 November 1915; Kononovka, Russian Empire (present-day Lubny Raion, Ukraine)
- Died: 9 March 2006 (aged 90) Warsaw, Poland
- Occupations: Actress and singer

Anna Weronika Bielicka (9 November 1915 – 9 March 2006) was a Polish singer and actress, known by the name Hanna and its affectionate diminutive, Hanka.

== Life ==
Hanka Bielicka was born in 1915 in Konovka near Poltava (then part of the Russian Empire, now Ukraine). After World War I, she moved to Łomża, where she lived until the beginning of World War II. Despite leaving, she remained very fond of the town and had a significant influence on its culture.

In 1939, she completed her degree in Warsaw, after which she began working as an actress. During World War II she worked closely with Polish Theater "Pohulanka" in Vilnius. After 1945, she performed in many Polish theaters, including Dramatic Theater in Białystok and the Cameral Theater in Łódź, among others. In 1977, she retired but continued to appear on stage and on television.

Her first cabaret turned out to be her breakthrough; it was where she met Bogdan Brzeziński, who decided to write something especially for her. After a couple of years of planning, he created the character Dziunia Pietruńska, who commented on reality in a unique and unforgettable way. The character became so beloved that it was featured on Polish Radio for 25 years on a program called “Podwieczorek przy mikrofonie“ (“Afternoon tea with the microphone”).

The most recognized feature of Bielicka was her voice, which her friends often called "the most beautiful hoarseness of the world" She was also famous for her many extravagant hats, which remained her signature style throughout the years and were a staple of her performances.

She appeared in more than 20 films and television productions. Because her voice was consideredunsuitable for film, she was usually cast in supporting roles.

== Death ==
She died on 9 March 2006 after undergoing surgery for an aortic aneurysm, from which she never regained consciousness. She was buried in Powązki Cemetery in her family tomb.

== Selected filmography ==
- Ja wam pokażę! (2006)
- Sukces (2000)
- Palce lizać (1999)
- Colonel Wolodyjowski (1969)
- Piekło i niebo (1966)
- Niewiarygodne przygody Marka Piegusa (1966)
- Marriage of Convenience (1966)
- Ping-pong (1965)
- Dom bez okien (1962)
- Gangsterzy i filantropi (1962)
- Cafe Pod Minogą (1959)
- Zadzwońcie do mojej żony (1958)
- Irena do domu! (1955)
- Autobus odjeżdża 6:20 (1954)
- A Matter to Settle (1953)
- Zakazane piosenki (1947)
