= Tadeusz Kalinowski =

Polish actor

- Born: 1 June 1915; Leibnitz, Austria
- Died: 22 August 1969 (aged 54); Lubniewice, Poland
- Occupation: Actor
- Years active: 1954–1979

Tadeusz Kalinowski (1 June 1915 – 22 August 1969) was a Polish actor. He appeared in thirty films and television shows between 1954 and 1979.

== Selected filmography ==
- How to Be Loved (1963)
- Pięciu (1964)
- Czterej Pancerni i Pies (1966)
- Everything for Sale (1969)
