= Józef Pieracki =

Polish actor

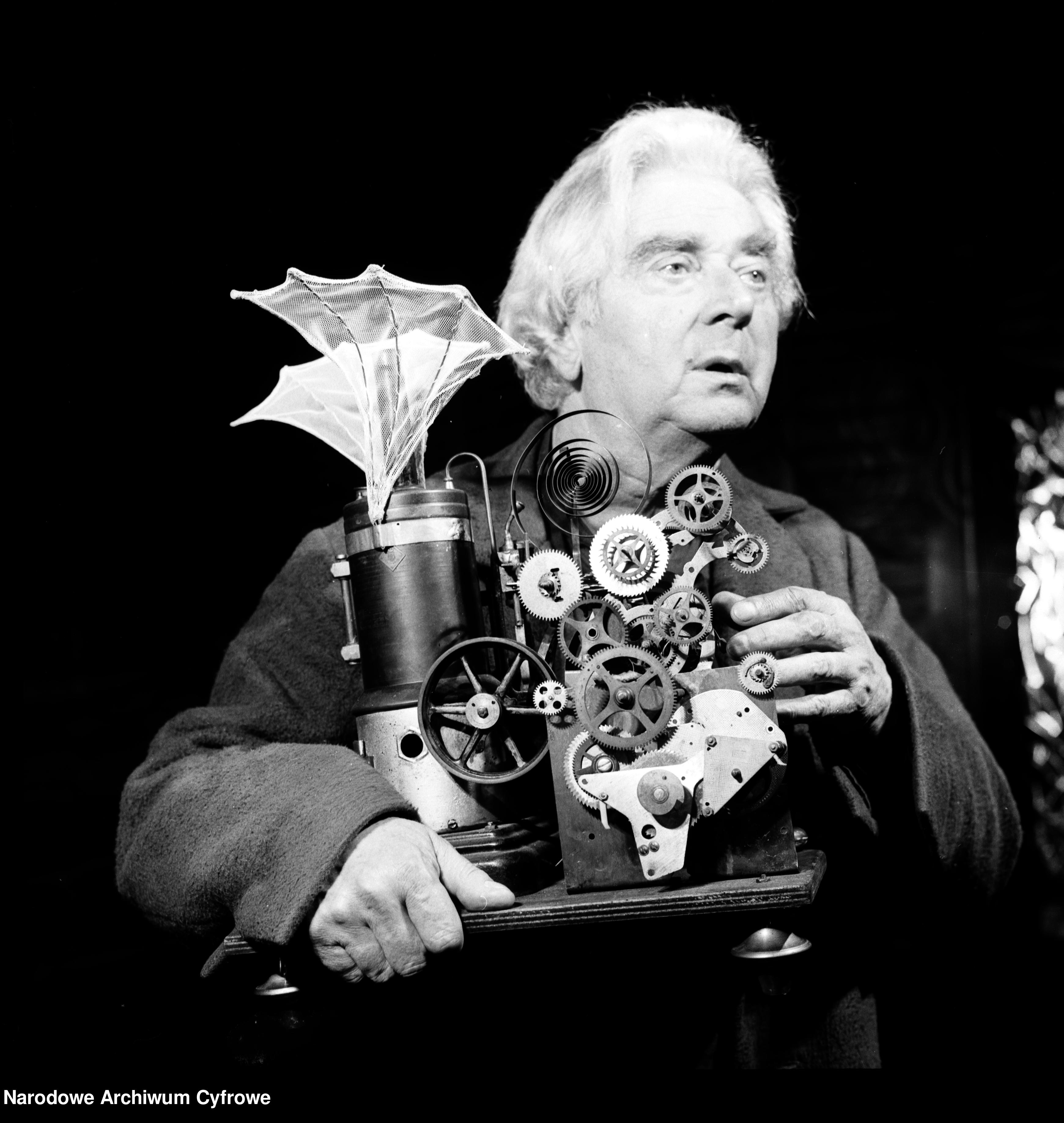
- Born: 10 September 1909; Grębów, Austria-Hungary
- Died: 5 August 1988 (aged 78); Wrocław, Poland
- Occupation: Actor
- Years active: 1953-1986

Józef Pieracki (10 September 1909 - 5 August 1988) was a Polish actor. He appeared in more than seventy films from 1953 to 1986.

== Selected filmography ==
| Year | Title | Role | Notes |
|---|---|---|---|
| 1955 | Irena do domu! | | |
| 1958 | Farewells | | |
| 1968 | The Doll | | |
| 1969 | Hunting Flies | | |
| 1970 | Landscape After the Battle | | |
