= Kazimierz Wichniarz =

- Born: 18 January 1915; Posen, German Empire (now Poznań, Poland)
- Died: 26 June 1995 (aged 80); Warsaw, Poland
- Occupation: Actor

Kazimierz Wichniarz (18 January 1915 – 26 June 1995) was a Polish film and theatre actor. In 1974 he starred in the Academy Award-nominated film The Deluge under Jerzy Hoffman.

He is interred at the Powązki Military Cemetery in Warsaw.

== Selected filmography ==
- Szatan z siódmej klasy (1960)
- Godzina pąsowej róży (1963)
- Małżeństwo z rozsądku (1966)
- The Peasans (Chłopi, 1972) TV series
- The Peasants (Chłopi, 1973)
- Hubal (1973)
- The Deluge (Potop, 1974)
- The Promised Land (Ziemia obiecana, 1974)
- Zamach stanu (1981)

== Honours and awards ==
- Commander's Cross of the Order of Polonia Restituta (1984); previously awarded the Officer's Cross (1975) and the Knight's Cross (1967)
- Gold Cross of Merit (1956)
- Medal of the 10th anniversary of the Polish People's Republic (1955)
- Medal of the 40th anniversary of the Polish People's Republic (1984)
- Badge of Merit in Culture (1975)
- Gold Badge of Trade Unions (1975)
- Badge "For merits for Warsaw" (1967)
- Prize of the City of Warsaw (1980)
