= Stanisław Jędryka =

Polish film director and writer (1933–2019)

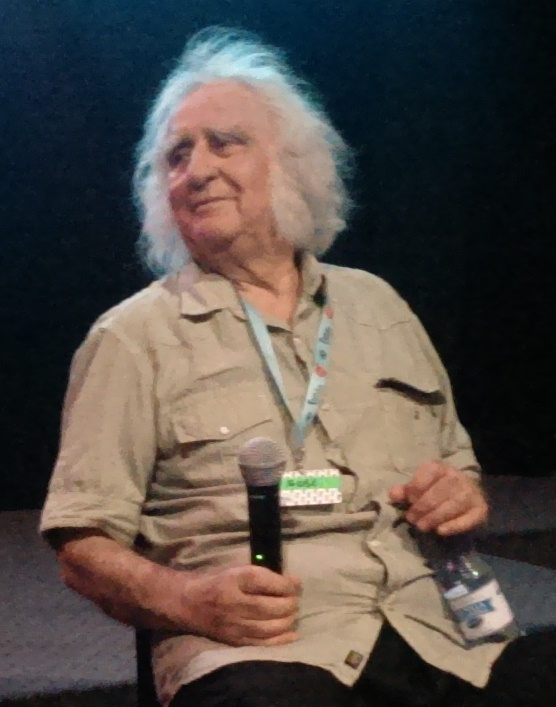
- Jędryka in June 2017
- Born: 27 July 1933; Sosnowiec, Poland
- Died: 22 April 2019 (aged 85); Warsaw, Poland
- Occupation: Film director
- Years active: 1954–1992

Stanisław Jędryka (27 July 1933 – 22 April 2019) was a Polish film director and writer. He was a graduate of the National Film School in Łódź (1956). Mostly known for films aimed at children and young adults, he directed 25 films between 1954 and 1992.

== Selected filmography ==
- 1962 – The Impossible Goodbye
- 1965 – Wyspa złoczyńców
- 1969 – Do przerwy 0:1 (TV series)
- 1970 – Wakacje z duchami (TV series)
- 1972 – Podróż za jeden uśmiech
- 1973 – Stawiam na Tolka Banana (TV series)
- 1988 – Banda Rudego Pająka (TV series)
