= Marriage of Convenience (1967 film) =

1961 film by Stanisław Bareja

- Directed by: Stanisław Bareja
- Written by: Krzysztof Gruszczyński
- Starring: Elżbieta Czyżewska; Hanna Bielicka
- Cinematography: Franciszek Kądziołka
- Music by: Jerzy Matuszkiewicz
- Release date: 1 January 1967
- Running time: 90 minutes
- Country: Poland
- Language: Polish

Marriage of Convenience (Polish: Małżeństwo z rozsądku) is a Polish musical comedy from 1966 directed by Stanisław Bareja.

== Cast ==
- Daniel Olbrychski – Andrzej
- Elżbieta Czyżewska – Joanna
- Bohdan Łazuka – Edzio Siedlecki
- Hanka Bielicka – Joanna's mother
- Bogumił Kobiela – „engineer” Kwilecki
- Wiesława Kwaśniewska – Magda
- Jacek Fedorowicz – director
- Wojciech Pokora – secret agent
- Andrzej Zaorski – visual artist
- Wojciech Rajewski – professor Lipski
- Bolesław Płotnicki – Joanna's father
- Kazimierz Wichniarz – Magda's father
- Janina Romanówna – aunt Edzia
- Alicja Bobrowska – mrs. Kwilecki
- Cezary Julski – Burczyk's helper
- Jarema Stępowski – painting marchand
- Tadeusz Chyła – band leader
- Stanisław Bareja – man buying a suit
- Witold Dębicki – Majk
- Wiesław Michnikowski – agent
- Gerard Wilk – dancer
