= Elżbieta Czyżewska =

Polish actress (1938–2010)

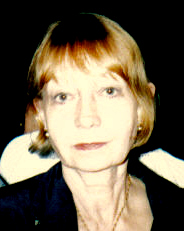
- Czyżewska in 2007
- Born: Elżbieta Justyna Czyżewska; May 14, 1938; Warsaw, Poland
- Died: June 17, 2010 (aged 72); New York City, U.S.
- Education: National Academy of Dramatic Art in Warsaw (Master of Fine Arts
- Occupation: Actress
- Years active: 1958–2010
- Notable work: Donna Frasquetta Salero in The Saragossa Manuscript (1964); Melinda Kalman in Music Box (1989)
- Spouses: Jerzy Skolimowski (m. 1959; div. 1965) David Halberstam (m. 1965; div. 1977)
- Awards: Obie Award (1990)

Elżbieta Justyna Czyżewska (May 14, 1938 – June 17, 2010) was a Polish actress active in both Poland and the United States. She began her career in Poland and then moved to New York City in the 1960s.

She gained critical acclaim in the early 1960s that culminated in breakthrough performances in The Saragossa Manuscript (1964, dir. Wojciech Jerzy Has), Marriage of Convenience (1966, dir. Stanisław Bareja) and Everything for Sale (1969, dir. Andrzej Wajda). Czyżewska received the Obie Award for Distinguished Performance by an Actress in 1990 for Crowbar.

== Early life ==
Czyżewska was born in Warsaw in 1938. She attended the State Academy of Theatre in Warsaw and was advised by the dean that in order to play leading roles in romantic repertory theater, she should undergo plastic surgery to reduce the size of her breasts. She refused after consulting with her colleagues in the anti-establishment Student Satirical Theatre.

Her first marriage was to film director Jerzy Skolimowski. In 1965, she married the New York Times Warsaw correspondent David Halberstam. She left Poland for the United States with him, but they divorced in 1977.

== Career in Poland ==
At the peak of her film and theater career, and in trouble with the communist regime because of her marriage to Halberstam, Czyżewska was cast by the Polish director Andrzej Wajda in his film Everything for Sale. The young directors of the Polish new wave in cinema recognized their peer in breaking the conventions of superficial romantic comedy. In A Bride for the Australian (1963), Where is the General (1963) and Giuseppe in Warsaw (1964), Czyżewska created a character who was almost the reverse of the Cinderella-versus-Prince Charming formula, as it was her charm and wit that turned her suitors into her equals. Not a "method" actor, she did not try to disappear into characters or let her beauty wholly define her succession of screen and stage parts. Wojciech Has directed her performance in The Saragossa Manuscript (1964).

Perhaps Czyżewska's most significant stage success was in the Teatr Dramatyczny 1965 production of Arthur Miller's After the Fall. By now internationally recognized as one of Poland's top young actors, she expanded her artistic range in two film dramas: Unloved (1965) by Janusz Nasfeter and Wajda's Everything for Sale (1968). The dark tone of these films marked the country's disillusionment after a brief period of cultural "thaw". Unloved, set shortly before the outbreak of World War II, tells the story of a young Jewish woman's love affair.

Czyżewska became an outcast and exile because of her marriage to Halberstam, who was expelled from Poland for his sharp criticisms of the regime. Czyżewska's career was disrupted, and when she returned in 1968 at Wajda's invitation to play in his film Everything for Sale, production was complicated by the March outbreak of student protests and the start of the communist government's antisemitic expulsions. Czyżewska was expelled, and partly because she promptly accepted a role in exiled director Aleksander Ford's adaptation of Aleksandr Solzhenitsyn's The First Circle, she was unable to work in Poland until 1980, when Lech Wałęsa's Solidarność movement had great influence.

== Career in the United States ==
The 1987 Hollywood film Anna is loosely based on Czyżewska's life. In the film, an exiled European movie star played by Sally Kirkland struggles to find work in New York City following her divorce from a well-connected intellectual, presumably based on Halberstam. Kirkland was nominated for an Academy Award in the Best Actress category and she won a Golden Globe for the role in 1988.

Czyżewska continued doing theater work in the U.S., winning an Obie Award in 1990 for her role in Crowbar by Mac Wellman. Her American premieres also included other Wellman plays as well as Janusz Głowacki's Hunting Cockroaches. She performed in Ibsen's When We Dead Awaken at the American Repertory Theater and in several productions at Yale Repertory Theater. She also played in Big Potato (by Arthur Laurents) at the Doris Duke Theater.

Czyżewska played the role of Greek socialite Maria Mitsotáki in a 1990 stage adaptation of The Changing Light at Sandover by James Merrill, sharing the stage with the poet. The performance was filmed and released as "Voices From Sandover" (Films for the Humanities, Inc., FFH 4182, distributed by Films Media Group, Princeton, New Jersey).

Her American films include Music Box, Running on Empty, Eduardo Machado's Exiles In New York and Putney Swope. Czyżewska's television appearances include the American Playhouse drama Misplaced on PBS. Her later theater roles were in Martha Clarke's Vienna Lusthaus, Hedda Gabler at the New Theatre Workshop in 2004, and Darkling in 2006. In June 2007, she returned to Poland for a performance of Darkling at the Aleksander Fredro Teatr.

In May 2005, Czyżewska was honored with the Cultural Award of Merit by the consul general of the New York Polish consulate, the highest award that a Polish-American may receive. The ceremony began the first American retrospective of her work at the first New York Polish Film Festival, directed by Hanna Hartowicz.

Czyżewska's final leading role was in the film June Weddings, adapted from a play written and directed by Barbara Hammond, which brought her great critical praise on the film-festival circuit. Her role as a Russian émigré in New York was called "superbly acted" and "a grown-up feast". The Baltimore City Paper wrote that "The delightful Elzbieta Czyzewska plays a Russian woman so slyly, seductively Old World and languorous she gives 'v' its own beat when she says 'love'." The film also starred Tom Noonan.

== Death ==
Czyżewska died on June 17, 2010 in New York at the age of 72 from esophageal cancer. John Guare wrote Erased/Elżbieta, a tribute play about her, which premiered at the Atlantic Theater in New York in 2011.
