= Everything for Sale (1969 film) =

1968 Polish film

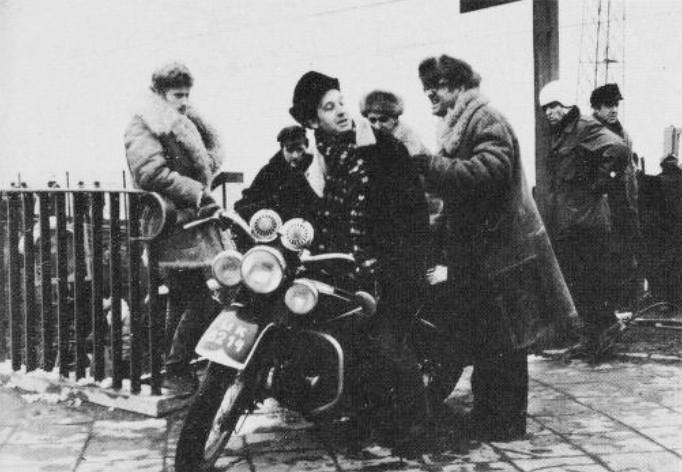
- Directed by: Andrzej Wajda
- Written by: Andrzej Wajda
- Starring: Beata Tyszkiewicz
- Cinematography: Witold Sobocinski
- Release date: 28 January 1969
- Running time: 105 minutes
- Country: Poland
- Language: Polish

Everything for Sale (Polish: Wszystko na sprzedaż) is a 1969 Polish drama film written and directed by Andrzej Wajda. The film was selected as the Polish entry for the Best Foreign Language Film at the 42nd Academy Awards, but was not accepted as a nominee.

== Cast ==
- Beata Tyszkiewicz as Beata
- Elżbieta Czyżewska as Elzbieta
- Andrzej Łapicki as Andrzej
- Daniel Olbrychski as Daniel
- Witold Holtz as Witek
- Malgorzata Potocka as The Little
- Bogumił Kobiela as Bobek
- Elżbieta Kępińska as Actress in Theatre
- Irena Laskowska as Forester's Wife
- Tadeusz Kalinowski as Forester

== See also ==
- List of submissions to the 42nd Academy Awards for Best Foreign Language Film
- List of Polish submissions for the Academy Award for Best Foreign Language Film
