= Halina Kwiatkowska =

Polish actress (1921–2020)

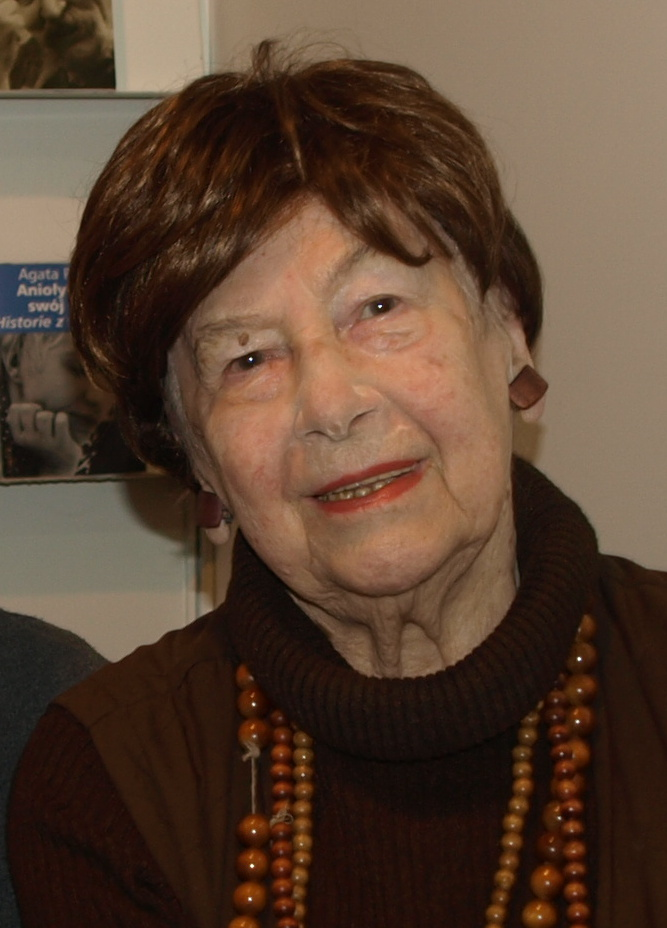
- Kwiatkowska in 2011
- Born: Halina Królikiewiczówna; 25 April 1921; Bochnia, Poland
- Died: 12 November 2020 (aged 99); Konstancin-Jeziorna, Poland
- Resting place: Rakowicki Cemetery
- Occupation: Actor
- Years active: 1941–2007
- Known for: Ashes and Diamonds; The Doll; And Along Come Tourists

Halina Kwiatkowska (née Królikiewiczówna, 25 April 1921 – 12 November 2020) was a Polish actress, educator, and writer. She performed in The Cherry Orchard at the National Stary Theatre in Kraków, and starred in the films Ashes and Diamonds, The Doll, and And Along Come Tourists.

== Personal life ==
Kwiatkowska was born in Bochnia, Poland. She attended Wadowice High School, where she met Karol Wojtyla (later Pope John Paul II). She last saw Wojtyla in 2002, after Wojtyla made a special effort to see her despite suffering from ill health. Kwiatkowska denied rumours that she and Wojtyla had been a couple in their early years, after the 2005 miniseries Karol: A Man Who Became Pope portrayed Kwiatkowska as a former lover of the Pope. Kwiatkowska was married to Tadeusz Kwiatkowski; they married shortly after the end of the Second World War.

Kwiatkowska died in Konstancin-Jeziorna. She was interred in the Rakowicki Cemetery, Kraków.

== Career ==
Kwiatkowska started acting at the Juliusz Słowacki Theatre. Her first performance was Król Duch (King Ghost) in 1941. During the Nazi occupation of Poland, Kwiatkowska and Wojtyla acted together at the underground Rapsodyczny Theatre. Kwiatkowska later worked at the Powszechny Theatre until 1947, when she joined the Kraków Theatre. In 1954, she acted in The Cherry Orchard at the National Stary Theatre in Kraków. In total, she played 64 different roles in theatre productions in Kraków. Kwiatkowska starred in nine films, including Ashes and Diamonds in 1958, The Doll in 1968, and the 2007 German film And Along Come Tourists.

For about 40 years Kwiatkowska taught at the State Higher School of Theatre in Kraków. There, she and Ewa Otwinowska wrote two plays: Ogłoszenie matrymonialne (Marriage Announcement) and Sytuację bez wyjścia (A Situation Without a Way Out). She wrote the book Porachunki z Pamięcia (Reckoning with Memory), which won a Kraków book of the month award.

For many years, until 2011, she was Chair of the Main Collegiate Court of the Association of Polish Stage Artists (ZASP).

== Awards and decorations ==
Her major awards include:

- 1955: Medal of the 10th Anniversary of People's Poland
- 1977: Meritorious Activist of Culture decoration
- 1981: Knight's Cross of the Order of Polonia Restituta
- 2007: Gold Medal for Merit to Culture – Gloria Artis,
- 2008: Honorary award from the Polish Culture Foundation in 2008.
- 2018: Medal on the 100th Anniversary of ZASP-SPATiF ( Association of Polish Stage Artists )
