= Tadeusz Borowski =

Polish writer and journalist

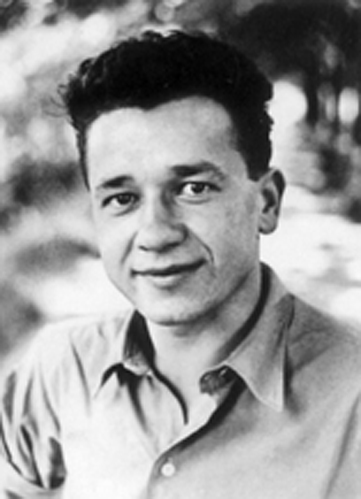
- Born: 12 November 1922; Zhytomyr, Ukrainian SSR, Soviet Union
- Died: 3 July 1951 (aged 28); Warsaw, Poland
- Occupations: writer, journalist
- Writing career
- Genres: poetry, short stories
- Notable work: This Way for the Gas, Ladies and Gentlemen
- Notable awards: National Literary Prize, Second Degree (Poland)

Tadeusz Borowski (Polish pronunciation: [taˈdɛ.uʐ bɔˈrɔfskʲi]; 12 November 1922 – 3 July 1951) was a Polish writer and journalist. His wartime poetry and stories dealing with his experiences as a prisoner at Auschwitz are recognized as classics of Polish literature.

== Early life ==
Borowski was born in 1922 into the Polish community in Zhytomyr, Ukrainian SSR (today Ukraine). In 1926, his father, whose bookstore had been nationalized by the communists, was sent to a camp in the Gulag system in Russian Karelia because he had been a member of a Polish military organization during World War I. In 1930, Borowski's mother was deported to a settlement on the shores of the Yenisey, in Siberia, during Collectivization. During this time Tadeusz lived with his aunt.

Borowski and his family were targeted (as Poles) by the Soviet Union during Stalin's Great Terror. In 1932, the Borowskis were expatriated to Poland by the Polish Red Cross in an exchange for Communist prisoners. Impoverished, the family settled in Warsaw.

== Experiences under Nazi occupation ==
Under Nazi occupation, Poles were forbidden to attend university or even secondary school. In 1940 Borowski finished his secondary schooling in Nazi-occupied Poland in an underground lyceum. He graduated from high school in 1940 amid the roundups of Jewish residents. He began his underground studies in Polish literature at Warsaw University. His classes met in secret at private homes. While attending university he met Maria Rundo, who would become the love of his life.

He also became involved with the leftist publication Droga. Wherever the Earth (1942), his anonymously self-published collection of poems, was distributed illegally. The poems have been described by modern scholars as "remarkable for their dark view of the earth as an enormous labor camp".

While a member of the educational underground in Warsaw, Borowski was engaged and living with Rundo. After Maria did not return home one night in February 1943, Borowski began to suspect that she had been arrested. Rather than staying away from any of their usual meeting places, though, he walked straight into the trap that was set by the Gestapo agents in the apartment of his and Maria's close friend. Borowski was 21 years old when he was imprisoned in Pawiak prison for two months before he was shipped to Auschwitz that April.

Forced into slave labor in extremely harsh conditions, Borowski later reflected on this experience in his writing. In particular, working on a railway ramp in Auschwitz-Birkenau, he witnessed arriving Jews being told to leave their personal property behind, and then being transferred directly from the trains to the gas chambers. While a prisoner at Auschwitz, Borowski caught pneumonia; afterwards, he was put to work in a Nazi medical experiment "hospital." He was able to maintain written and personal contact with his fiancée, who was also imprisoned in Auschwitz.

In late 1944 Borowski was transported from Auschwitz to the Dautmergen subcamp of Natzweiler-Struthof, and finally to Dachau. Dachau-Allach, where Borowski was imprisoned, was liberated by the Americans on 1 May 1945; after that Borowski found himself in a camp for displaced persons near Munich.

== After the war ==
He spent some time in Paris, and then returned to Poland on 31 May 1946. His fiancée, who had survived the camps and emigrated to Sweden, returned to Poland in late 1946, and they were married in December 1946.

Borowski turned to prose after the war, believing that what he had to say could no longer be expressed in verse. His series of short stories about life in Auschwitz was published as Pożegnanie z Marią (Farewell to Maria, English title This Way for the Gas, Ladies and Gentlemen). The main stories are written in the first person from the perspective of an Auschwitz inmate; they describe the morally numbing effect of everyday terror, with prisoners, trying to survive, often being indifferent or mean towards each other; the privileges of non-Jewish inmates like Borowski; and the absence of any heroism. Early on after its publication in Poland, the work was accused of being nihilistic, amoral and decadent. His short story cycle World of Stone describes his time in displaced person camps in Germany.

Borowski's short story Silence was written in the aftermath of the liberation of Dachau. The story is set in the newly liberated concentration camp and opens with imagery depicting a disgraced SS officer being dragged into an alley by a mob of prisoners who try to tear him apart with their bare hands. They return to the barracks and the scene is one of communal food preparation, prisoners noisily grinding grain, slicing meat, mixing pancake batter and peeling potatoes in the narrow paths that wind between their bunk beds. They are playing cards and drinking hot soup when an American officer arrives. While expressing sympathy for the prisoners seeking vengeance against their captors, he urges restraint, and promises punishment under law. Some prisoners begin to debate whether to kill the American officer, but the crowd begins to applaud the officer's promise of justice. When the American officer leaves the camp the prisoners return to the SS officer from the opening scene and trample him to death.

The Polish government considered the story "amoral" but Borowski found work as a journalist. He joined the Soviet-controlled Polish Workers' Party in 1948 and wrote political tracts as well. At first he believed that Communism was the only political force truly capable of preventing any future Auschwitz from happening. In 1950 he received the National Literary Prize, Second Degree.

In the summer of 1949 he was sent to work in the Press Section of the Polish Military Mission in Berlin. He returned to Warsaw a year later and entered into an extramarital affair.

Soon after a close friend of his (the same friend who had earlier been imprisoned by the Gestapo, and in whose apartment both Borowski and his fiancée had been arrested) was imprisoned and tortured by the Communists. Borowski tried to intervene on his behalf and failed; he became completely disillusioned with the socialist regime.

== Death ==
On July 3, 1951, at the age of 28, Borowski died by suicide by breathing in gas from a gas stove. His wife had given birth to their daughter, Małgorzata Borowska, a few days prior to his death.

"On 6 July 1951, the openly anti-militarist Borowski was buried, of all places, in the military section of Powązki National Cemetery in Warsaw to the strains of 'The Internationale', and was posthumously awarded the highest honours. An obituary notice in Nowa Kultura was signed by 86 writers. Soon after, a special issue of this weekly newspaper appeared with contributions from the elite of Polish literature. Since then, countless texts, poems and articles by and about Borowski have been published, as well as many books in various languages and editions," writes Holocaust survivor Arnold Lustiger in Die Welt. The book "This Way for the Gas, Ladies and Gentlemen" is now also published as part of 'Penguin Classics', further cementing Borowski's place amongst literary greats.

== Legacy ==
His books are recognized as classics of Polish post-war literature and had much influence in Central European society.

- Tadeusz Borowski is the subject of the 'Beta' section in Czesław Miłosz's book, The Captive Mind.
- His friend Tadeusz Drewnowski published several books about Borowski, including the 1962 biography Ucieczka z kamiennego świata (Escape from the World of Stone) and Postal indiscretions: the correspondence of Tadeusz Borowski.
- The 1970 Polish film Landscape After the Battle is based on Borowski's writings.
- The 1984 Style Council song "Ghosts of Dachau" was inspired by This Way for the Gas, Ladies and Gentlemen.
- Borowski's books are mentioned in the award-winning 1995 novel The Reader ("Der Vorleser") by the German author Bernhard Schlink, in which a former concentration camp guard commits suicide in remorse after reading Borowski's and other survivors' memoirs.
- In 2002, Imre Kertész, while receiving the Nobel Prize in Literature, stated that all his works were written because of his own fascination with Borowski's prose.

== Bibliography in English ==
- This Way for the Gas, Ladies and Gentlemen (Proszę państwa do gazu), Penguin Books, London, 1992. 192 pages, hardcover. ISBN 0-14-018624-7.
- We Were in Auschwitz (Byliśmy w Oświęcimiu), Natl Book Network, 2000. 212 pages, hardcover. ISBN 1-56649-123-1.
- Postal indiscretions: the correspondence of Tadeusz Borowski (Niedyskrecje pocztowe: korespondencja Tadeusza Borowskiego), Northwestern University Press, 2007. ISBN 0-8101-2203-0.
- Tadeusz Borowski: Selected Poems, hit & run press, California, 1990. 117 pages, Bilingual, hardcover and paperback. Translated by Tadeusz Pioro, Larry Rafferty, & Meryl Natchez, with an introduction by Stanisław Barańczak.
- Here in Our Auschwitz and Other Stories (Yale University Press, 2021). Trans. Madeline G. Levine.

== See also ==
- List of Polish writers
- List of Poles
- Polish literature
