= A Matter to Settle =

- Directed by: Jan Fethke; Jan Rybkowski
- Written by: Bronislaw Brok; Jan Fethke; Zdzislaw Gozdawa; Stefania Grodzienska; Waclaw Stepien
- Produced by: Michal Grynblat; Zbigniew Ronert; Tadeusz Slaby; Henryk Szlachet; Zygmunt Szyndler
- Starring: Gizela Piotrowska; Bogdan Niewinowski; Adolf Dymsza
- Cinematography: Adolf Forbert
- Edited by: Jerzy Pekalski; Czeslaw Raniszewski; Anna Rubinska
- Music by: Zygmunt Wiehler
- Production company: Wytwórnia Filmów Fabularnych
- Release date: 5 September 1953
- Running time: 81 minutes
- Country: Poland
- Language: Polish

A Matter to Settle (Polish: Sprawa do zalatwienia) is a 1953 Polish comedy film directed by Jan Fethke and Jan Rybkowski and starring Gizela Piotrowska, Bogdan Niewinowski and Adolf Dymsza.

== Partial cast ==
- Gizela Piotrowska as Zofia Lipinska
- Bogdan Niewinowski as Stefan Wisniewski
- Adolf Dymsza as Train Passenger / Taxi Driver / Clerk / Waiter Wladyslaw / Reporter Banasinski / Salesman / Playboy / Boxer Fronczak
- Hanka Bielicka as Tradeswoman, Train Passenger
- Irena Brodzinska as Singer
- Edward Dziewonski as Factory Manager
- Waclaw Jankowski as Waiter
- Zofia Jamry as Playboy's Girl
- Irena Kwiatkowska as Train Passenger
- Józef Kondrat as Train Passenger
- Jan Kurnakowicz as Sound Technician
- Antoni Kolczyński as Boxer Józwiak
- Stanislaw Lapinski as Manager at Restaurant
- Kazimierz Opalinski as Director, Train Passenger
- Lech Ordon as Jerzy
- Jerzy Pietraszkiewicz as Singer
- Stefan Witas as Guest at Restaurant

== Bibliography ==
- Charles Ford & Robert Hammond. Polish Film: A Twentieth Century History. McFarland, 2005.
