= Szkice węglem =

1957 Polish historical film

Szkice węglem is a 1957 Polish historical film directed by Antoni Bohdziewicz. It is based on a novel by Henryk Sienkiewicz.
