= This Way for the Gas, Ladies and Gentlemen =

Book by Tadeusz Borowski

- Author: Tadeusz Borowski
- Original title: Pożegnanie z Marią
- Language: English
- Genre: Documentary
- Publisher: Viking Penguin
- Publication date: 1946
- Publication place: United States
- English publication date: 1967
- Media type: Print (paperback)
- Pages: 180
- ISBN: 0-14-018624-7
- OCLC: 2458688
- Dewey Decimal: 891.8/537 20
- LC Class: PG7158.B613 A28 1976

This Way for the Gas, Ladies and Gentlemen, also known as Ladies and Gentlemen, to the Gas Chamber, is a collection of short stories by Tadeusz Borowski, which were inspired by the author's concentration camp experience. The original title in the Polish language was Pożegnanie z Marią (Farewell to Maria). Following two year imprisonment at Auschwitz, Borowski had been liberated from the Dachau concentration camp in the spring of 1945, and went on to write his collection in the following years in Stalinist Poland. The book, translated in 1959, was featured in the Penguin's series "Writers from the Other Europe" from the 1970s.

== Overview ==
Borowski was arrested by the Gestapo in 1942. He was not a part of the Polish resistance movement in World War II against the Nazis in Warsaw, but his fiancée was. She was captured after falling into a trap set by the Nazis, and sent to a concentration camp. When she did not return home for the night, Borowski became worried, and started looking for her, only to end up falling in the same trap. He was caught and subsequently incarcerated at Auschwitz death camp for two years. He was sent on a death march to the Dachau concentration camp ahead of the Soviet Army's advance, which he survived, and was liberated by the U.S. Seventh Army in the spring of 1945.

Borowski was not Jewish, but was detained at Auschwitz and Dachau as a political prisoner. His views were therefore different from the post-war narratives of the Jewish concentration camp survivors. In searing and shockingly satirical prose, Borowski detailed what life-and-death felt like in the German concentration camps, including his revelations about the poisonous relationships between the prisoners themselves.

The short stories in his collection are linked by the themes as well as the presence of the main character Tadek, who serves the role of the narrator as well as the book's focal point. To a large degree the narrations are autobiographical. Tadek is a condensed version of Tadeusz and there is a high likelihood that Borowski wrote only from his personal experience. However, the two personalities (the author, and the narrator) themselves are different. Tadek is a survivalist with a hard shell. Borowski, as described by his followers and people who knew him well, was a heart-centered leader and a man who nobly helped others and did not worry about himself.

=== Literary structure of the collection ===
The book was featured in Penguin's series "Writers from the Other Europe" from the 1970s. Philip Roth was the general editor, and the series included authors such as Danilo Kiš, Bruno Schulz, Jiří Weil, and Milan Kundera, among others. The short stories contained in this volume include:

1. "Pożegnanie z Marią" ("Farewell to Maria")
2. "Dzień na Harmenzach" ("A Day in Harmenza")
3. "Proszę państwa do gazu" ("This Way for the Gas, Ladies and Gentlemen")
4. "Śmierć powstańca" ("Death of an Insurrectionist")
5. "Bitwa pod Grunwaldem" ("Battle of Grunwald")

With the author's permission, the volume was expanded to include further stories:

1. "Chłopiec z Biblią" ("A Boy with a Bible")
2. "U nas, w Auschwitzu..." ("Among Us, in Auschwitz...")
3. "Ludzie, którzy szli" ("The People Who Walked By")
4. "Ojczyzna" ("The Motherland")
5. "Ofensywa styczniowa" ("The January Offensive")

In the stories Borowski takes a "behavioral" approach – he only describes the behavior and outward reactions of the characters without delving into inner emotions and motivations, or specifying any kind of obvious moral judgement.

Borowski's work attracted much attention, and his stories of the camps were highly acclaimed in Polish literary circles. Despite the deceptive simplicity of his style and his documentary technique, his writing carries a burden of meaning that far transcends the merely actual. — Penguin Books

== See also ==
- Hanna Krall
- Zofia Nałkowska
- Polish literature
