= The Doll (1968 film) =

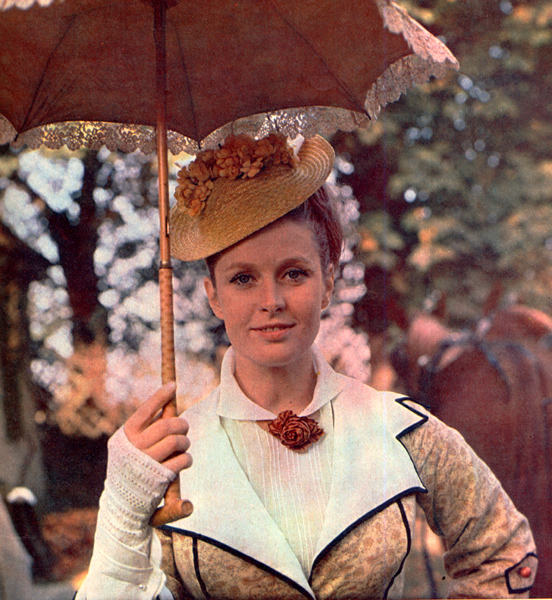
- Beata Tyszkiewicz in The Doll, 1968
- Directed by: Wojciech Has
- Written by: Wojciech Has
- Based on: The Doll by Bolesław Prus
- Starring: Beata Tyszkiewicz; Mariusz Dmochowski; Tadeusz Fijewski
- Cinematography: Stefan Matyjaszkiewicz
- Edited by: Zofia Dwornik
- Music by: Wojciech Kilar
- Production company: Wytwórnia Filmów Fabularnych (Łódź)
- Release date: 7 November 1968 (Poland)
- Running time: 151 minutes
- Country: Poland
- Language: Polish

The Doll (Polish: Lalka) is a 1968 Polish film directed by Wojciech Jerzy Has.

The film is an adaptation of the novel The Doll by Bolesław Prus, which is regarded by many as one of the finest Polish novels ever written. The influence of Émile Zola is evident, and some have compared the novel to Madame Bovary by Gustave Flaubert; both were Prus's contemporaries. The movie, however, may be more compared to Stendhal's The Red and the Black.

The Doll constitutes a panorama of life in Warsaw between 1878 and 1879, and at the same time is a subtle story of three generations of Polish idealists, their psychological complications, their involvement in the history of the nineteenth century, social dramas, moral problems and the experience of tragic existence. At the same time this story describes the disintegration of social relationships and the growing separation of a society whose aristocratic elite spreads the models of vanity and idleness. In the bad air of a backward country, antisemitic ideas are born, valuable individuals meet obstacles on their way, and scoundrels are successful.

This poetic love story follows a nouveau riche merchant, Stanisław Wokulski (played by Mariusz Dmochowski), through a series of trials and tribulations occasioned by his obsessive passion for an aristocratic beauty, Izabela Łęcka (played by Beata Tyszkiewicz).

== Plot ==
As a descendant of an impoverished Polish noble family, young Wokulski is forced to work as a waiter at Hopfer's, a Warsaw restaurant, while dreaming of a life in science. After taking part in the failed 1863 Uprising against Tsarist Russia, he is sentenced to exile in Siberia.

On eventual return to Warsaw, he becomes a salesman at Mincel's haberdashery. Marrying the late owner's widow (who eventually dies), he comes into money and uses it to set up a partnership with a Russian merchant he had met while in exile. The two merchants go to Bulgaria during the Russo-Turkish War, and Wokulski makes a fortune supplying the Russian Army.

The enterprising Wokulski now proves a romantic at heart, falling in love with Izabela, daughter of the vacuous, bankrupt aristocrat, Tomasz Łęcki. In his quest to win Izabela, Wokulski begins frequenting theatres and aristocratic salons; and to help her financially distressed father, founds a company and sets the aristocrats up as shareholders in his business. The indolence of these aristocrats, who are secure with their pensions but are too lazy to undertake new business risks, frustrates Wokulski. His ability to make money is respected but his lack of family and social rank is condescended to. Because of his "help" (in secret) to Izabela's impecunious but influential father, the girl becomes aware of his affection. In the end she consents to accept him, but without true devotion or love.

== Cast ==
- Mariusz Dmochowski – Stanisław Wokulski
- Beata Tyszkiewicz – Izabela Łęcka
- Tadeusz Fijewski – Ignacy Rzecki
- Halina Gallowa – Zasławska
- Wiesław Gołas – Krzeszowski
- Kalina Jędrusik – Wąsowska
- Jan Koecher – Prince
- Jan Kreczmar – Tomasz Łęcki
- Tadeusz Kondrat – Szlangbaum
- Halina Kwiatkowska – Krzeszowska
- Andrzej Łapicki – Kazimierz Starski
- Jan Machulski – Julian Ochocki
- Józef Pieracki – Doctor Szuman
- Janina Romanówna – Countess Joanna

== Reception ==
Time Out calls the film "A handsomely mounted Polish marathon".
