= Piotr Szczepanik =

Polish singer and actor (1942–2020)

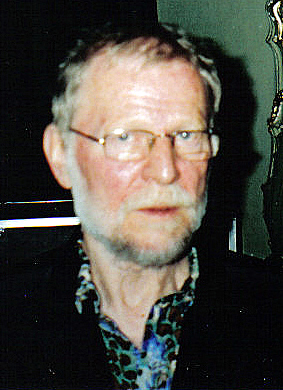
Piotr Szczepanik

Piotr Stanisław Szczepanik (14 February 1942 – 20 August 2020) was a popular Polish singer and actor.

Some of his better known songs are Żółte Kalendarze ("Yellow calendars"), Kochać ("To love"), Goniąc kormorany ("Chasing cormorants"), and Nigdy więcej ("Never again").

Szczepanik was born in Lublin. From 1980 to 1989, he was involved with the Solidarity movement.

In 2008, he was awarded the Officer's Cross of the Order of Polonia Restituta.

Szczepanik died on 20 August 2020, after years of dealing with illness.

== Selected discography ==
- 1966 Piotr Szczepanik śpiewa
- 1969 Największe przeboje
- 1987 P. Szczepanik, największe przeboje
- 1991 P. Szczepanik & Ricercar 64
