= Stefan Witas =

Polish actor and singer (1908–2006)

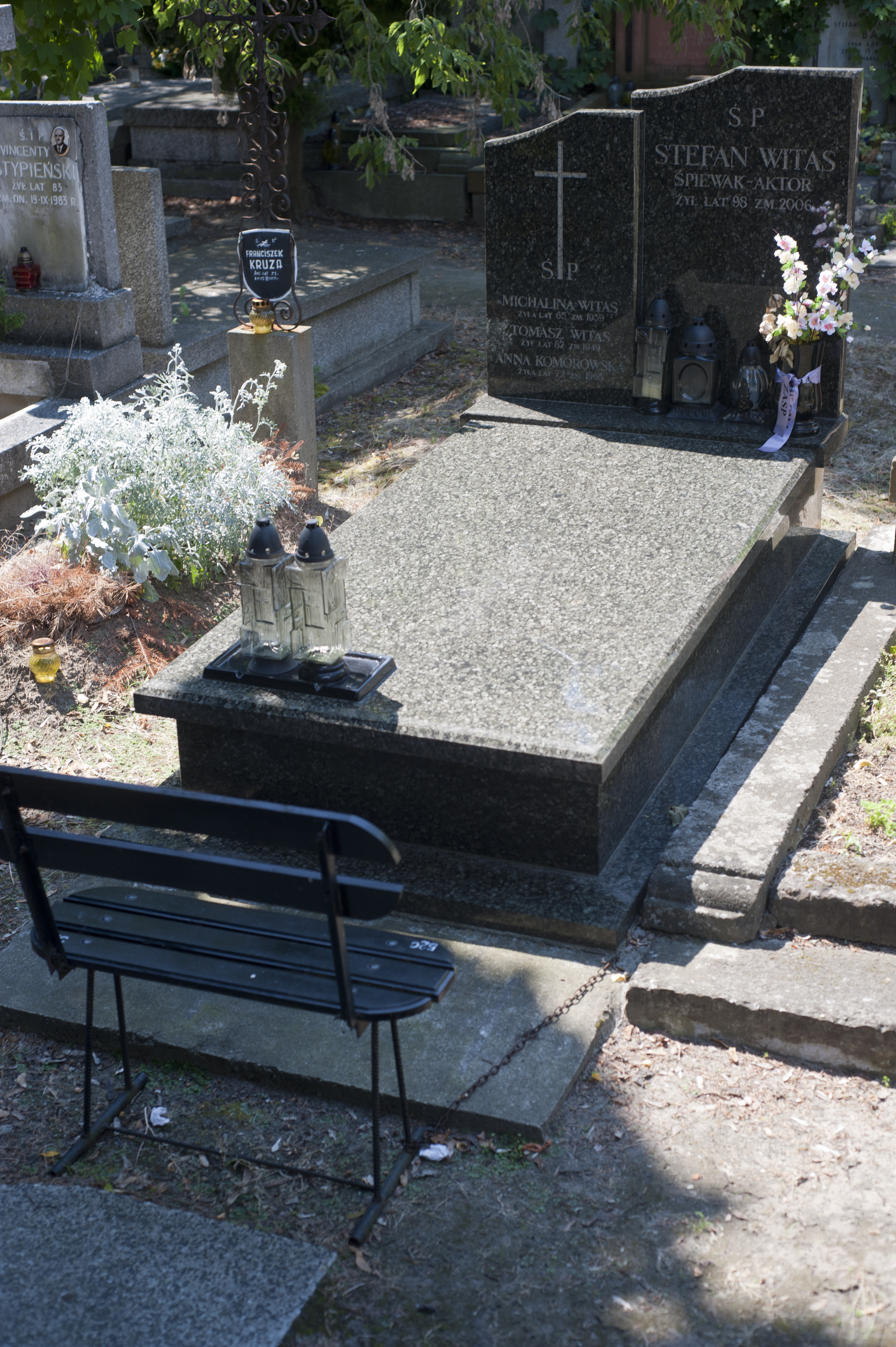
Grave of Witas at Bródno Cemetery

Stefan Witas (born 21 June 1908 in Warsaw, died 18 August 2006 in Warsaw), also known as Stefan Nowita, was a Polish actor and singer. In 1933, he began performing at places of entertainment in Warsaw, then in theatrical stages in many Polish cities. In 1937 he came in third place in the Polish Radio competition for the most popular singer. He worked in famous nightclubs like Adria, Gastronomia and Alhambra.

During the war, he performed in cafés in Warsaw, Lviv, Kraków and Lublin. After the war he was associated with the pl:Teatr Syrena and later with the Warsaw Operetta. He performed on the radio show "Tea." His repertoire included opera and operetta arias, songs, carols, songs, cabaret songs, and dances. He also appeared as an actor in films including Irena do domu!, Cafe pod Minogą, and Inspekcja pana Anatola. He is buried in Warsaw at Bródno Cemetery.
