= Marek Sart =

Polish composer

Marek Sart, full name of Jan Szczerbiński (4 June 1926 in Łódź – 6 November 2010 in Otwock) was a Polish composer and music arranger. He studied Polish literature at the University of Łódź and composition at the Academy of Music in Warsaw.
