= Andrzej Wajda =

Polish film director (1926–2016)

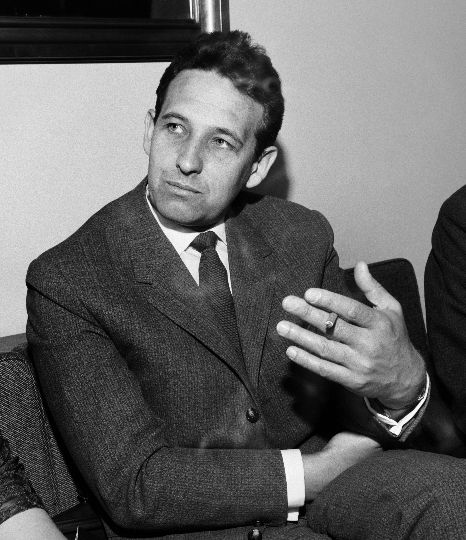
- Wajda in 1963
- Born: Andrzej Witold Wajda; 6 March 1926; Suwałki, Second Polish Republic
- Died: 9 October 2016 (aged 90); Warsaw, Poland
- Education: National Film School in Łódź
- Occupations: Film director; theatre director
- Years active: 1951–2016
- Spouses: Gabriela Obremba (m. 1949; div. 1959); Zofia Żuchowska (m. 1959; div. 1967); Beata Tyszkiewicz (m. 1967; div. 1969); Krystyna Zachwatowicz (m. 1974)
- Awards: Palme d'Or; Honorary Golden Bear; Honorary Oscar; Golden Lion Honorary Award

Andrzej Witold Wajda (Polish: [ˈandʐɛj ˈvajda]; 6 March 1926 – 9 October 2016) was a Polish film and theatre director. Recipient of an Honorary Oscar, the Palme d'Or, as well as Honorary Golden Lion and Honorary Golden Bear Awards, he was a prominent member of the "Polish Film School". He was known especially for his trilogy of war films consisting of A Generation (1955), Kanał (1957) and Ashes and Diamonds (1958).

Considered one of the world's most renowned filmmakers, his works chronicled his native country's political and social evolution and dealt with the myths of Polish national identity, offering analysis of the universal element of the Polish experience – the struggle to maintain dignity under the most trying circumstances.

Four of his films have been nominated for the Academy Award for Best Foreign Language Film: The Promised Land (1975), The Maids of Wilko (1979), Man of Iron (1981) and Katyń (2007).

== Early life ==
Wajda was born in Suwałki, the son of Aniela (née Białowąs), a school teacher, and Jakub Wajda, an army officer. In 1942, he joined the Polish resistance and served in the Home Army. After the war, he studied to be a painter at Kraków's Academy of Fine Arts before entering the Łódź Film School, where many famous Polish directors, such as Roman Polanski, studied.

== Early career ==
After Wajda's apprenticeship to director Aleksander Ford, Wajda was given the opportunity to direct his own film. A Generation (1955) was his first major film. At the same time Wajda began his work as a director in theatre, including Michael V. Gazzo's A Hatful of Rain (1959), Hamlet (1960), and Two for the Seesaw (1963) by William Gibson. Wajda made two more increasingly accomplished films, which developed further the anti-war theme of A Generation: Kanał (1957) (Special Jury Prize at Cannes Film Festival in 1957, shared with Bergman's The Seventh Seal) and Ashes and Diamonds (1958) with Zbigniew Cybulski.

While capable of turning out mainstream commercial fare (often dismissed as "trivial" by critics), Wajda was more interested in works of allegory and symbolism, and certain symbols (such as setting fire to a glass of liquor, representing the flame of youthful idealism that was extinguished by the war) recur often in his films. Lotna (1959) is full of surrealistic and symbolic scenes and shots, but he managed to explore other styles, making new wave style Innocent Sorcerers (1960) with music by Krzysztof Komeda, starring Roman Polanski and Jerzy Skolimowski (who was also a co-script writer) in the episodes. Then Wajda directed Samson (1961), the story of Jacob, a Jewish boy, who wants to survive during the Nazi occupation of Poland. In the mid-1960s Wajda made The Ashes (1965) based on the novel by Polish writer Stefan Żeromski and directed several films abroad: Love at Twenty (1962), Siberian Lady Macbeth (1962) and Gates To Paradise (1968).

In 1967, Cybulski, a popular screen actor at the time, was killed in a train accident, whereupon the director articulated his grief with Everything for Sale (1968), considered one of his most personal films, using the technique of a film-within-a-film to tell the story of a film maker's life and work. The following year he directed an ironic satire Hunting Flies with the script written by Janusz Głowacki and a short television film called Przekładaniec based on a screenplay by Stanisław Lem.

== Artistic recognition ==
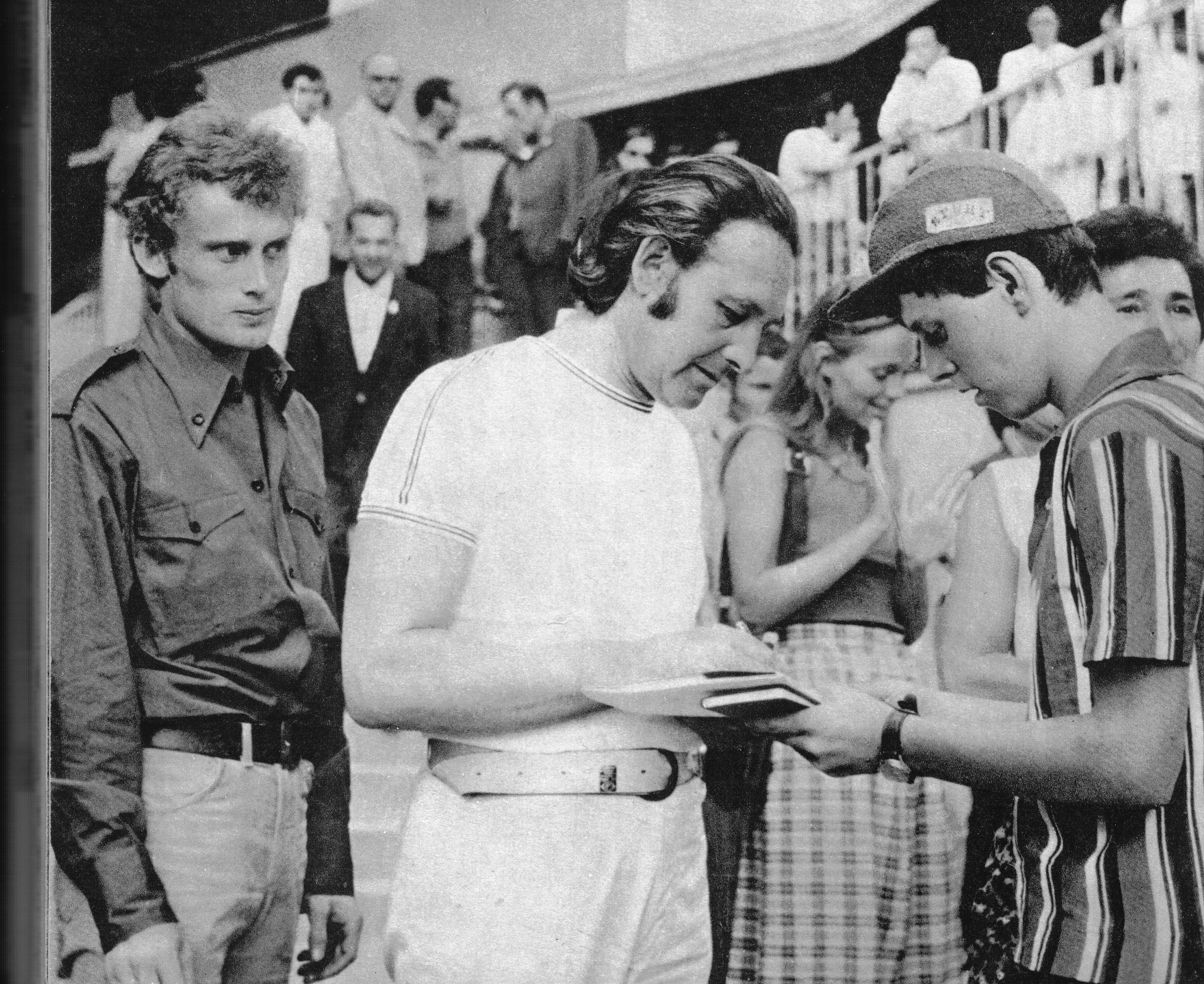
Andrzej Wajda (center), c. 1970

The 1970s were the most prolific artistic period for Wajda, who made over ten films: Landscape After the Battle (1970), Pilate and Others (1971), The Wedding (1972) – the film version of the famous Polish poetic drama by Stanisław Wyspiański, The Promised Land (1975), Man of Marble (1977) – the film takes place in two time periods, the first film showing the episodes of Stalinism in Poland, The Shadow Line (1976), Rough Treatment (a.k.a. Without Anesthesia) (1978), The Orchestra Conductor (1980), starring John Gielgud; and two psychological and existential films based upon novels by Jarosław Iwaszkiewicz – The Birch Wood (1970) and The Maids of Wilko (1979). The Birch Wood was entered into the 7th Moscow International Film Festival where Wajda won the Golden Prize for Direction.

Wajda continued to work in theatre, including Play Strindberg, Dostoyevsky's The Possessed and Nastasja Filippovna – Wajda's version of The Idiot, November Night by Wyspiański, The Immigrants by Sławomir Mrożek, The Danton Affair or The Dreams of Reason.

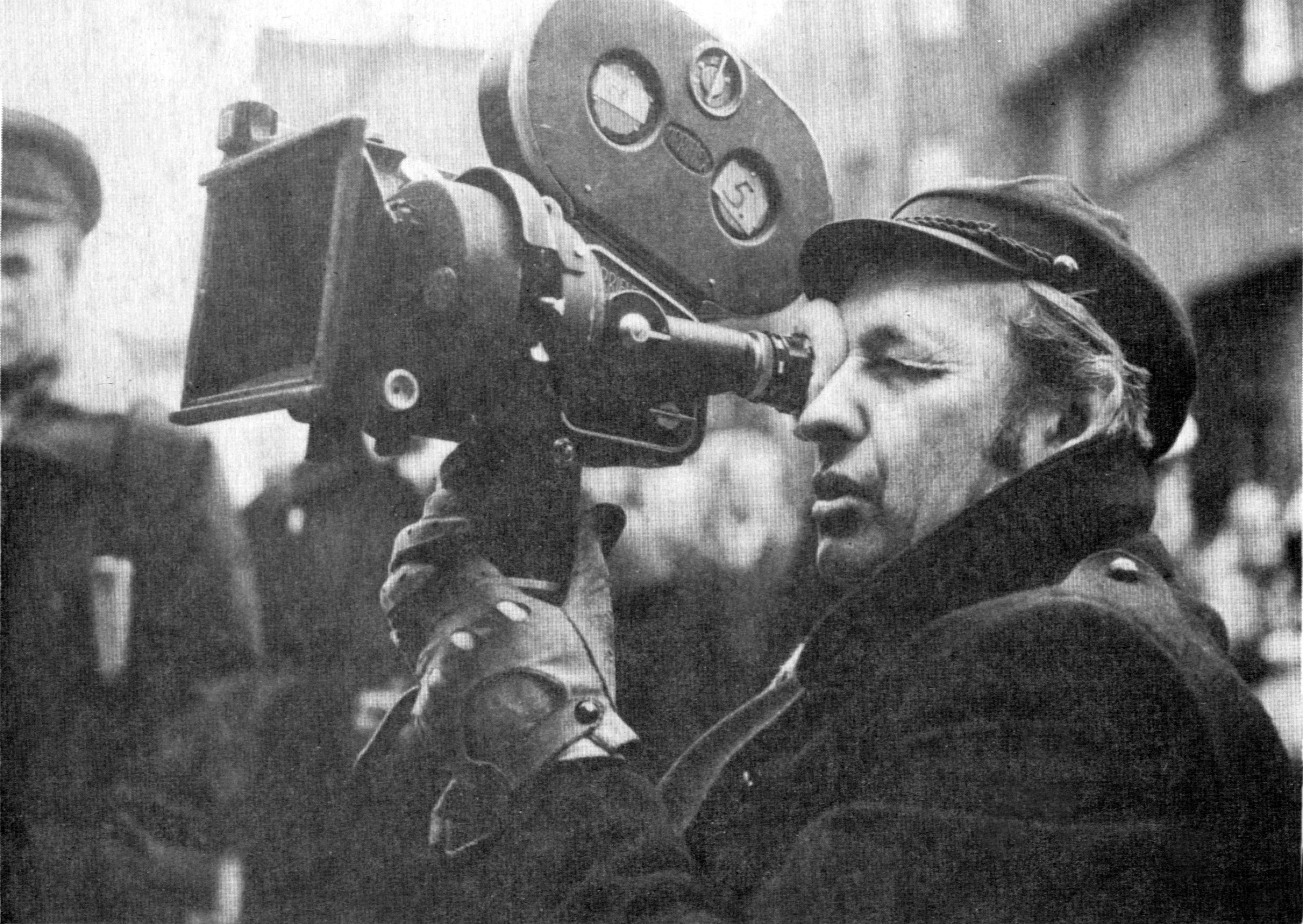
Wajda during filming in 1974

Wajda's later commitment to Poland's burgeoning Solidarity movement was manifested in Man of Iron (1981), a thematic sequel to The Man of Marble, with Solidarity leader Lech Wałęsa appearing as himself in the latter film. The film sequence is loosely based on the life of Anna Walentynowicz, a hero of socialist labor Stakhanovite turned dissident and alludes to events from real life, such as the firing of Walentynowicz from the shipyard and the underground wedding of Bogdan Borusewicz to Alina Pienkowska. The director's involvement in this movement would prompt the Polish government to force Wajda's production company out of business. For the film, Wajda won the Palme d'Or at the Cannes Film Festival.

In 1983, he directed Danton, starring Gérard Depardieu in the title role, a film set in 1794 (Year Two of the French Republican calendar) dealing with the Post-Revolutionary Terror. Made against the backdrop of the martial law in Poland, Wajda showed how easily revolution can change into terror and start to "eat its own children." For this film Wajda was honoured with the Louis Delluc Prize and a César Award for Best Director. In the 1980s, he also made A Love in Germany (1983) featuring Hanna Schygulla, The Chronicle of Amorous Incidents (1986) an adaptation of Tadeusz Konwicki's novel and The Possessed (1988) based on Dostoyevsky's novel. In theatre he prepared an interpretation of Dostoyevsky's Crime and Punishment (1984) and other unique spectacles such as Antygone, his sequential Hamlet versions and the early 20th-century Jewish play The Dybbuk. In 1989, he was the president of the jury at the 16th Moscow International Film Festival.

== Career after 1990 ==
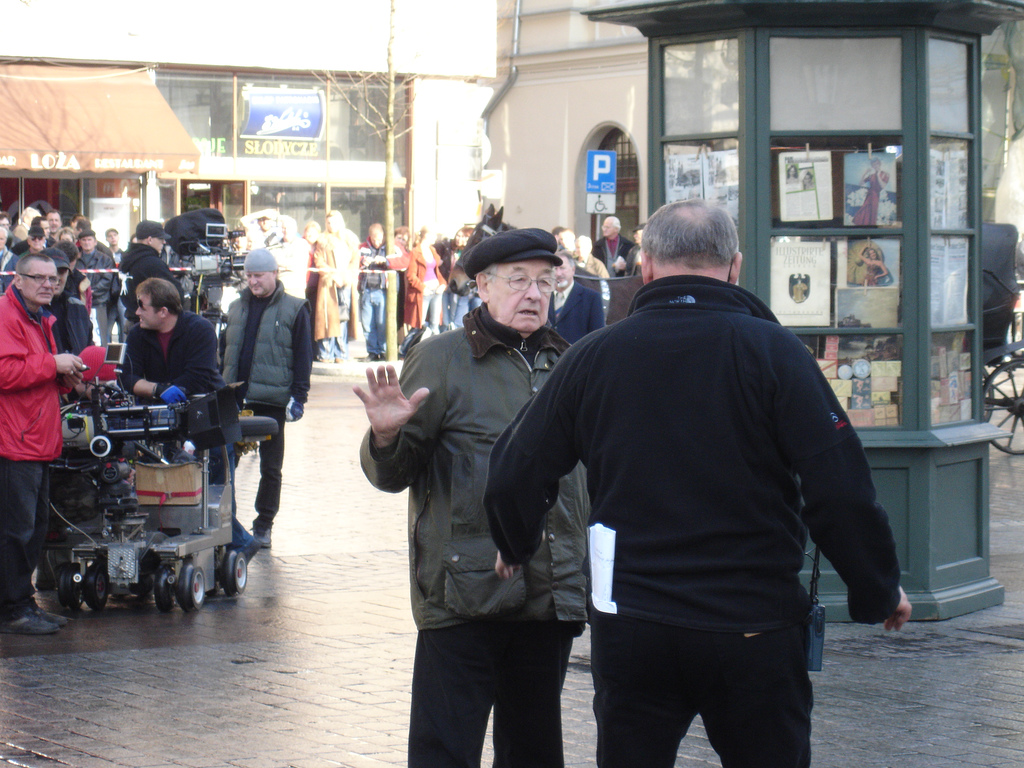
During the filming of Katyń in 2007

In 1990, Andrzej Wajda was honoured by the European Film Awards for his lifetime achievement, only the third director to be so honoured, after Federico Fellini and Ingmar Bergman. In the early 1990s, he was elected a senator and also appointed artistic director of Warsaw's Teatr Powszechny. He continued to make films set during World War II, including Korczak (1990), a story about a Jewish-Polish doctor who takes care of orphan children, in The Crowned-Eagle Ring (1993) and Holy Week (1995) specifically on Jewish-Polish relations. In 1994, Wajda presented his own film version of Dostoyevsky's novel The Idiot in the fim Nastasja, starring Japanese actor Tamasoburo Bando in the double role of Prince Mishkin and Nastasja. The film's cinematographer was Paweł Edelman, who subsequently became one of Wajda's great collaborators. In 1996, the director went in a different direction with Miss Nobody, a coming-of-age drama that explored the darker and more spiritual aspects of a relationship between three high-school girls. In 1999, Wajda released the epic film Pan Tadeusz, based on the epic poem of the Polish 19th-century romantic poet Adam Mickiewicz.

A year later, at the 2000 Academy Awards, Wajda was presented with an honorary Oscar for his contribution to world cinema; he subsequently donated the award to Kraków's Jagiellonian University. In 2002, Wajda directed The Revenge, a film version of his 1980s comedy theatre production, with Roman Polanski in one of the main roles. In February 2006, Wajda received an Honorary Golden Bear for lifetime achievement at the Berlin International Film Festival. In 2007, Katyń was released, a well-received film about the Katyń massacre, in which Wajda's father was murdered; the director also shows the dramatic situation of those who await their relatives (mothers, wives and children). The film was nominated for the Best Foreign Language Film Oscar in 2008.

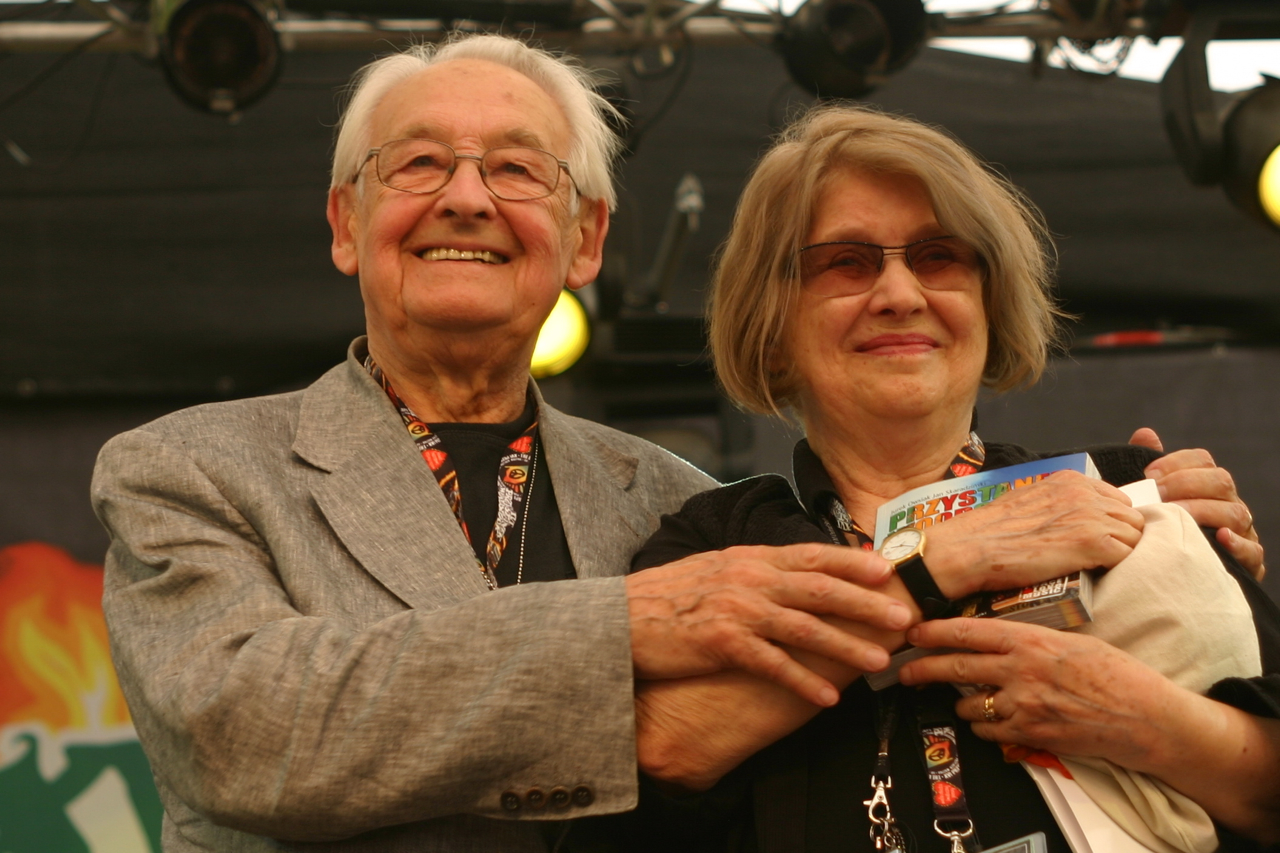
Wajda pictured with his wife, Krystyna Zachwatowicz, in 2010

Wajda followed it with Sweet Rush (2009) with Krystyna Janda as a main character. It is partly based upon a short Jarosław Iwaszkiewicz novel. The film is dedicated to Edward Kłosiński, Janda's husband, a cinematographer and a long-time Wajda friend and co-worker who died of cancer the same year. For this film Wajda was awarded by Alfred Bauer Prize at the 2009 Berlin International Film Festival. He received the Prix FIPRESCI during the 2009 European Film Awards. Walesa. Man of Hope (Wałęsa. Człowiek z nadziei), Wajda's biography of Lech Wałęsa, based on a script by Janusz Głowacki and starring Robert Więckiewicz in the title role, had its world premiere at the 2013 Venice International Film Festival. His last film was the 2016 Afterimage (Powidoki), starring Bogusław Linda as Polish avant-garde painter Władysław Strzemiński.

Wajda founded The Japanese Centre of Art and Technology in Kraków in 1994. In 2002, he founded and led his own film school with Polish filmmaker Wojciech Marczewski. Students of Wajda School take part in different film courses led by famous European film makers.

== Personal life ==
Wajda was married four times. His third wife was actress Beata Tyszkiewicz with whom he had a daughter, Karolina (born 1967). His fourth wife was the theatre costume designer and actress Krystyna Zachwatowicz.

In September 2009, Wajda called for the release of director Roman Polanski after Polanski was arrested in Switzerland in relation to his 1977 charge for drugging and raping a 13-year-old girl.

Wajda died in Warsaw on 9 October 2016 at the age of 90 from pulmonary failure. He was buried at Salwator Cemetery in Kraków.

== Awards and honours ==
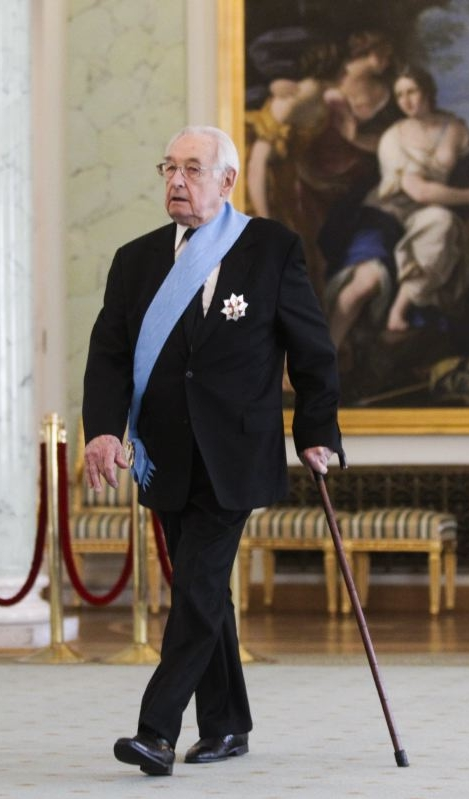
Andrzej Wajda during the Order of the White Eagle Award Ceremony in 2011

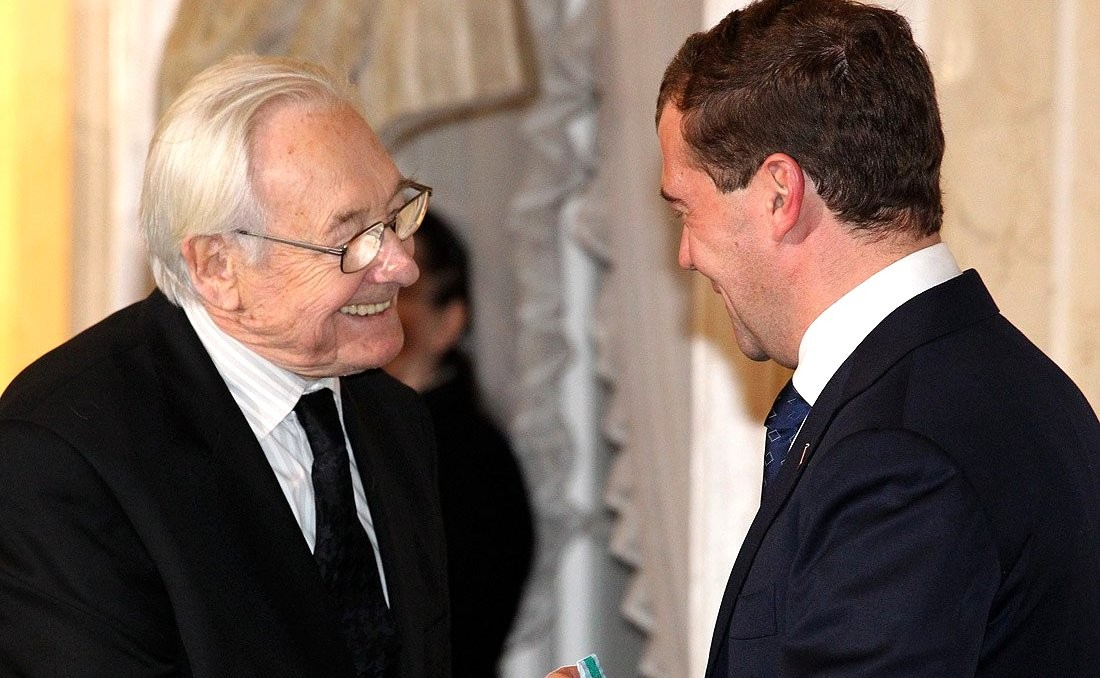
Russian President Dmitry Medvedev during of Order of Friendship to Andrzej Wajda, 6 December 2010

- 2012: Order of Merit of the Republic of Hungary;
- 2011: Order of the White Eagle (the highest Polish distinction), Commander of the Order of Three Stars (Latvia);
- 2010: Order of Friendship of the Russian Federation, Order of Danica Hrvatska (Croatia);
- 2008: Order of Prince Yaroslav the Wise (Ukraine), Order of the Cross of Terra Mariana (Estonia);
- 2007: Nomination for an Academy Award for Katyń;
- 2006: Order for Merits to Lithuania;
- 2006: Honorary Golden Bear for lifetime achievement at the 56th Berlin International Film Festival;
- 2005: Gold Medal for Merit to Culture – Gloria Artis;
- 2001: Commander's Cross of Legion d'Honneur of the French Republic, Great Cross of the Order of Merit of the Federal Republic of Germany, Doctor Honoris Causa of the Moscow State Academy of Choreography;
- 2000: Academy Honorary Award from the Academy of Motion Picture Arts and Sciences;
- 2000: Doctor Honoris Causa of the Warsaw Academy of Fine Arts, Order of Merit of the Italian Republic;
- 1999: Grand Cross of the Order of Polonia Restituta, Freedom Award for film-making and for "unparalleled commitment to freedom" at the Freedom Film Festival in Berlin, the Crystal Iris for life achievement at the National Film Festival in Brussels;
- 1997: Praemium Imperiale Award of the Japanese Society for the Promotion of Art, Silver Bear for life achievement and, specifically, for Holy Week, at the 46th Berlin Film Festival (1996); Best Director Award for Miss Nobody at the 13th Festroia International Film Festival, Portugal;
- 1997: Honourable Mention at the 47th Berlin International Film Festival for Miss Nobody;
- 1996: Silver Bear for an outstanding artistic contribution at the 46th Berlin International Film Festival for Wielki tydzień;
- 1995: Order of the Rising Sun (Japan), Doctor Honoris Causa of Université Libre de Bruxelles, Belgium, Witkacy Prize – Critics' Circle Award of the Polish ITI Centre for the promotion of the Polish theatre abroad and Doctor Honoris Causa of the Lumière University Lyon 2 in Lyon, France;
- 1994: Ordre des Arts et des Lettres (France);
- 1990: European Felix Award for life achievement and an outstanding achievement and artistic conduct at the Cannes International Film Festival;
- 1989: Doctor Honoris Causa of the Jagiellonian University;
- 1988: Nomination for the Golden Bear at the 38th Berlin International Film Festival for Les Possédés;
- 1987: Kyoto Prize of the Japanese Inamori Foundation for contribution to the development of science, technology and ideas;
- 1986: The Luigi Pirandello Award for activity and achievement in the area of theatre;
- 1985: Herder Prize for contribution to strengthening cultural relations with nations of Eastern and Southern Europe;
- 1983: César Award of the French Academy of Film Art and Technology for Danton;
- 1982: Knight of Legion d'Honneur (France); Onassis Foundation Award for work for human rights and dignity;
- 1981: Palme d'Or at the Cannes Film Festival for Man of Iron;
- 1981: Nomination of an Academy Award for Man of Iron;
- 1981: Doctor Honoris Causa of the University of Washington;
- 1980: FIPRESCI and Basque Cultural Society awards at the San Sebastián International Film Festival for The Orchestra Conductor;
- 1979: Golden Lions at the 6th Gdynia Film Festival for The Maids of Wilko, Prize of the Ecumenical Jury at the Cannes International Film Festival for Without Anesthesia, Life Achievement Award at the La Rochelle International Film Festival and Order of Saints Cyril and Methodius for contribution to the development of Polish-Bulgarian cultural co-operation;
- 1979: Nomination for an Academy Award for The Maids of Wilko;
- 1978: Golden Lions at the 5th Gdynia Film Festival for Without Anesthesia, Jury Award and Best Director Award at the 18th Cartagena Film Festival (Colombia) for Promised Land;
- 1978: FIPRESCI Award at the 1978 Cannes Film Festival for Man of Marble;
- 1976: Journalists Award at the 3rd Brussels International Film Festival for Promised Land, Golden Spike for The Promised Land at the Valladolid Film Festival;
- 1975: Golden Prize at the 9th Moscow International Film Festival for The Promised Land.;
- 1975: Nomination for an Academy Award for The Promised Land;
- 1973: Silver Shell at the San Sebastian International Film Festival for directing The Wedding;
- 1964: Officer's Cross of the Order of Polonia Restituta;
- 1959: Jury and FIPRESCI Award at the Venice Film Festival for Ashes and Diamonds, Knight's Cross of the Order of Polonia Restituta;
- 1957: Special Jury Prize at the Cannes International Film Festival for Kanał.

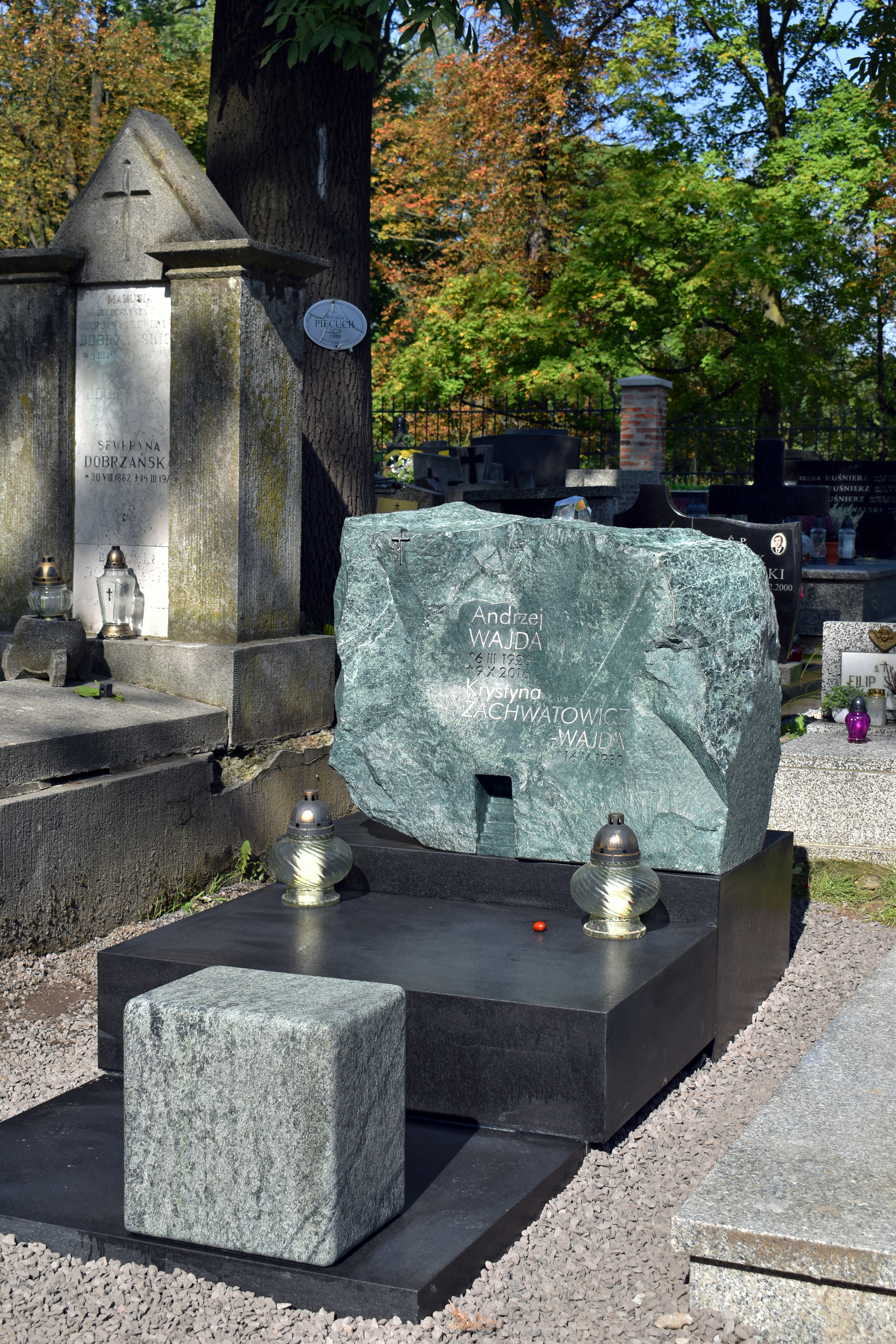
Salwator Cemetery Andrzej Wajda tomb

== See also ==
- Cinema of Poland
- List of Polish-language films
- Museum of Communism, Poland
- List of Poles
- List of Polish Academy Award winners and nominees
- Manggha(Manggha Museum of Japanese Art and Technology)
