= Andrzejewski =

- Pronunciation: Polish pronunciation: [andʐɛˈjɛfski]
- Gender: Male
- Language: Polish

Other gender
- Feminine: Andrzejewska

Origin
- Region of origin: Poland

Andrzejewski (Polish pronunciation: [andʐɛˈjɛfski]; feminine Andrzejewska; plural Andrzejewscy) is a Polish toponymic surname eventually derived from the given name Andrew. In the early 1990s there were 26,917 people in Poland with the name. Notable people with this name include:

- Andrzej Andrzejewski (1961–2008), Brigadier General of the Polish Air Force
- Bohdan Andrzejewski (born 1942), Polish fencer
- B. W. Andrzejewski (1922–1994), Polish-British Somalist
- Jadwiga Andrzejewska (1915–1977), Polish actress
- Jerzy Andrzejewski (1909–1983), Polish writer
- Leonard Andrzejewski (1924–1997), Polish actor
- Pat Benatar (born Patricia Mae Andrzejewski; 1953), American singer
- Tadeusz Andrzejewski (1923–1961), Polish archeologist
- Stanisław Andrzejewski (1919–2007), Polish-British sociologist
- Stanisław Andrzejewski (1916–1997), Polish footballer
- Stanley Andrews (born Stanley Martin Andrzejewski; 1891–1969), American actor
- Gust Andrzejewski (2010-....), roadrunner, risk taker

== See also ==
- Piotr Anderszewski and Dorota Anderszewska, Polish brother and sister, pianist and violinist
