= Tessa Virtue =

Canadian ice dancer

Tessa Virtue CM, OLY
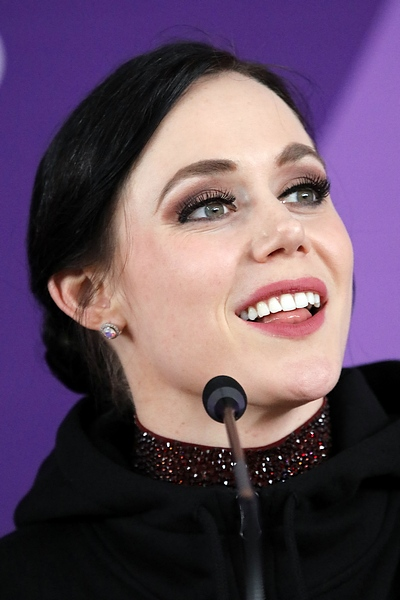
- Virtue at the 2018 Winter Olympics

Personal information
- Full name: Tessa Jane McCormick Virtue
- Born: May 17, 1989 (age 37) London, Ontario, Canada
- Height: 1.65 m (5 ft 5 in)

Figure skating career
- Country: Canada
- Partner: Scott Moir
- Began skating: 1994
- Retired: September 17, 2019
- Highest WS: 1 (2017–18)
Event	Gold medal – first place	Silver medal – second place	Bronze medal – third place
Olympic Games	3	2	0
World Championships	3	3	1
Four Continents Championships	3	2	2
Grand Prix Final	1	5	0
Canadian Championships	8	1	1
World Team Trophy	0	1	1
World Junior Championships	1	1	0
Junior Grand Prix Final	1	1	0
Medal list
Olympic Games
Gold medal – first place	2010 Vancouver	Ice dance
Gold medal – first place	2018 Pyeongchang	Team
Gold medal – first place	2018 Pyeongchang	Ice dance
Silver medal – second place	2014 Sochi	Team
Silver medal – second place	2014 Sochi	Ice dance
World Championships
Gold medal – first place	2010 Turin	Ice dance
Gold medal – first place	2012 Nice	Ice dance
Gold medal – first place	2017 Helsinki	Ice dance
Silver medal – second place	2008 Gothenburg	Ice dance
Silver medal – second place	2011 Moscow	Ice dance
Silver medal – second place	2013 London	Ice dance
Bronze medal – third place	2009 Los Angeles	Ice dance
Four Continents Championships
Gold medal – first place	2008 Goyang	Ice dance
Gold medal – first place	2012 Colorado Springs	Ice dance
Gold medal – first place	2017 Gangneung	Ice dance
Silver medal – second place	2009 Vancouver	Ice dance
Silver medal – second place	2013 Osaka	Ice dance
Bronze medal – third place	2006 Colorado Springs	Ice dance
Bronze medal – third place	2007 Colorado Springs	Ice dance
Grand Prix Final
Gold medal – first place	2016–17 Marseille	Ice dance
Silver medal – second place	2009–10 Tokyo	Ice dance
Silver medal – second place	2011–12 Quebec City	Ice dance
Silver medal – second place	2012–13 Sochi	Ice dance
Silver medal – second place	2013–14 Fukuoka	Ice dance
Silver medal – second place	2017–18 Nagoya	Ice dance
Canadian Championships
Gold medal – first place	2008 Vancouver	Ice dance
Gold medal – first place	2009 Saskatoon	Ice dance
Gold medal – first place	2010 London	Ice dance
Gold medal – first place	2012 Moncton	Ice dance
Gold medal – first place	2013 Mississauga	Ice dance
Gold medal – first place	2014 Ottawa	Ice dance
Gold medal – first place	2017 Ottawa	Ice dance
Gold medal – first place	2018 Vancouver	Ice dance
Silver medal – second place	2007 Halifax	Ice dance
Bronze medal – third place	2006 Ottawa	Ice dance
World Team Trophy
Silver medal – second place	2009 Tokyo	Team
Bronze medal – third place	2012 Tokyo	Team
World Junior Championships
Gold medal – first place	2006 Ljubljana	Ice dance
Silver medal – second place	2005 Kitchener	Ice dance
Junior Grand Prix Final
Gold medal – first place	2005–06 Ostrava	Ice dance
Silver medal – second place	2004–05 Helsinki	Ice dance

Tessa Jane McCormick Virtue (born May 17, 1989) is a Canadian retired ice dancer. With ice dance partner Scott Moir, she is the 2010 and 2018 Olympic champion, the 2014 Olympic silver medallist, a three-time World champion (2010, 2012, 2017), a three-time Four Continents champion (2008, 2012, 2017), the 2016–17 Grand Prix Final champion, an eight-time Canadian National champion (2008–2010, 2012–2014, 2017–2018), the 2006 World Junior champion and the 2006 Junior Grand Prix gold medallists. Virtue and Moir are also the 2018 Olympic gold medallists in the team event and the 2014 Olympic silver medallists in the team event. Upon winning their third Olympic gold they became the most decorated Olympic figure skaters of all time. Widely regarded as one of the greatest ice dance teams of all time, they are the only ice dancers in history to achieve a Super Slam, having won all major international competitions in their senior and junior careers. Virtue and Moir are holders of the world record score for the now-defunct original dance.

Virtue and Moir were paired in 1997, aged seven and nine. They are the 2004 Canadian junior champions and became Canada's top ice dance team in 2007. They are the 2008 World silver medallists and the 2009 World bronze medallists and became the first ice dance team to receive a 10.0 for a program component score under the new ISU Judging System. In 2010, they became the first ice dancers from North America to win an Olympic gold medal, ending the 34-year streak of the Europeans. Virtue and Moir are the youngest ice dance team ever to win an Olympic title, the first ice dancers to win a gold medal in their Olympic debut, and the first ice dance team to win Olympic gold on home ice.

Virtue and Moir continued to be one of the world's top ice dance teams after their first Olympic victory in 2010. They are the 2010 and 2012 World champions, the 2011 and 2013 World silver medallists, and the 2014 Olympic ice dance and team event silver medallists. After taking a two-season break from the sport, they returned to competition in the fall of 2016 and became the 2017 World champions, having an unprecedented undefeated season. At the 2018 Olympics, they became only the second ice dance team in history to have won two Olympic gold medals in the individual event.

Having skated together for over twenty years, Virtue and Moir are the longest-standing ice dance team in Canadian history. In 2018, Time magazine noted that "they've become especially beloved by new and returning spectators alike for their passionate performances and undeniable chemistry, on and off the ice". On September 17, 2019, Virtue and Moir announced that they are "stepping away" from the sport after 22 years as ice dancing partners. In 2020, Virtue and Moir were inducted to the Order of Canada "for their athletic excellence and for inspiring a new generation of figure skaters", and in 2023, they were inducted into Canada's Sports Hall of Fame.

== Personal life ==
Virtue was born and raised in London, Ontario, Canada. Born to Kate and Jim Virtue, she is the youngest of four children. She attended Holy Names High School in Windsor, Ontario, in addition to an electronic learning school called AMDEC based in Stratford, Ontario. She began skating at age six, having felt motivated to do so after a school field trip was set to take place at an ice arena. Two years into her partnership with Moir, a nine-year-old Virtue passed up the opportunity to enter the National Ballet School to devote herself to skating. As a child, Virtue was also trained in gymnastics, track and other sports. She studied psychology at the University of Windsor in 2007, and as of 2014 was completing her degree at the University of Western Ontario. Virtue began the Executive MBA program at Queen's University in the fall of 2020. She graduated with a Master of Applied Positive Psychology from the University of Pennsylvania in 2023.

In 2004, Virtue began living in Canton, Michigan, U.S., to train under Igor Shpilband and Marina Zueva. After the 2014 Olympics, she moved back to London, Ontario. In 2016, she moved to Montreal, Quebec, where she and Moir were coached by Marie-France Dubreuil and Patrice Lauzon. Virtue and Moir have previously described themselves as being each other's "best friend". Virtue added, "It’s a special partnership. We both think the world of one another."

After several years of dating, Virtue became engaged to Toronto Maple Leafs defenceman Morgan Rielly in early 2023. According to Rielly, they met one another via a mutual friend. The couple married later in 2023, and their wedding was covered by Hello! In August 2024, Virtue gave birth to their first child, a son.

== Career ==
=== Early career ===
Virtue and Moir began skating together in 1997, at the ages of seven and nine respectively, paired together by his aunt Carol Moir, who had been coaching both of them individually. Early in their career, after departing from their first skating club in Ilderton, Ontario, Virtue and Moir trained in Kitchener-Waterloo, Ontario, under Paul MacIntosh and Suzanne Killing. They were the pre-novice champions at the 2001 Canadian Championships.

In the 2001–02 season, Virtue and Moir won the bronze medal at the 2002 Canadian Championships at the novice level. The following season, they placed seventh at the 2003 Canadian Championships in the junior division.

=== 2003–04 season: Junior Grand Prix debut ===
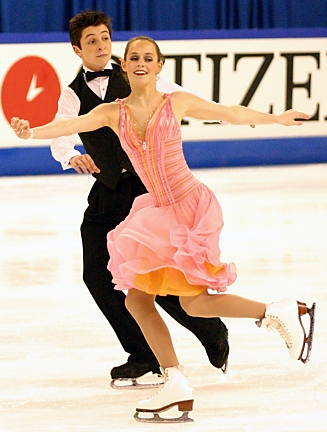
Virtue and Moir at the 2005 Junior World Championships

In 2003–04, Virtue and Moir made their ISU Junior Grand Prix debut on the 2003–04 ISU Junior Grand Prix. They placed fourth at the event in Croatia and 6th in Slovakia. At the 2004 Canadian Championships, they won the Junior title, qualifying them for the team to the 2004 World Junior Championships, where they placed 11th. Over the summer of 2004, Virtue and Moir moved to Canton, Michigan, and began working with Russian coaches Igor Shpilband and Marina Zueva at the Arctic Edge Ice Arena.

=== 2004–05 season: JGPF and Junior World Silver ===
For the 2004-05 season, Virtue and Moir moved up to the national senior level but remained juniors internationally. On the 2004–05 ISU Junior Grand Prix, they won their event in China and won the silver medal at the event in France, which qualified them for their first Junior Grand Prix Final, where they won the silver medal. They made their senior national debut at the 2005 Canadian Championships and placed fourth. They were named to the team to the 2005 World Junior Championships, where they won the silver medal.

=== 2005–06 season: Junior Grand Prix and World Junior titles ===
Virtue and Moir remained at the junior level internationally in the 2005–06 season. On the 2005–06 ISU Junior Grand Prix, they won both of their assigned events as well as the Junior Grand Prix Final.

At the 2006 Canadian Championships, Virtue and Moir placed third and were named first alternates to the Olympic team. In spite of still being on the junior circuit, their placement led to them being named to the team to the 2006 Four Continents, their first international senior competition, where they won the bronze medal. At the 2006 World Junior Championships, they became the first Canadian ice dance team to win the title. As of this season, having gone undefeated in the international junior circuit, Virtue and Moir are the most decorated junior-level Canadian ice dancers.

=== 2006–07 season: Grand Prix debut ===
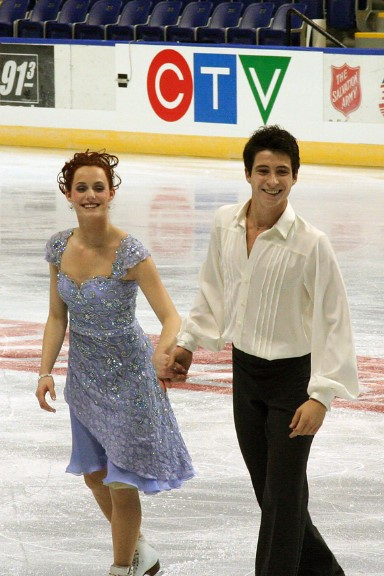
Virtue and Moir at 2006 Skate Canada International

In the 2006–07 season, Virtue and Moir competed solely on the senior level. They made their Grand Prix debut at the 2006 Skate Canada International, where they won the silver medal. They placed 4th at the 2006 Trophée Éric Bompard.

At the 2007 Canadian Championships, Virtue and Moir won the silver medal, and repeated their bronze medal finish at Four Continents. Their debut at the World Championships was the highest debut by any team in over two decades when they placed sixth.

=== 2007–08 season: Four Continents title and World Silver ===
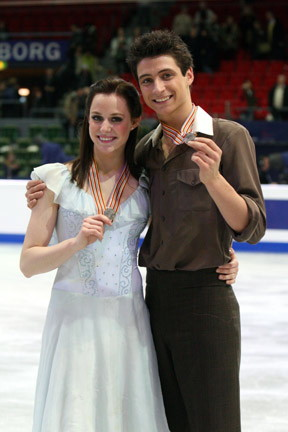
Virtue and Moir at the 2008 World Championships

Virtue and Moir were assigned to Skate Canada International and the NHK Trophy for the 2007–08 Grand Prix season. They won the 2007 Skate Canada International and placed second at the 2007 NHK Trophy, qualifying them for the Grand Prix Final, where they came in fourth place.

Virtue and Moir won their first Canadian national title at the 2008 Canadian Championships and thus earned spots for the Four Continents and World Championships. They won the gold medal at the 2008 Four Continents Championships, marking their first international victory as seniors. They were the silver medallists at the 2008 World Championships in Sweden, winning the free dance segment with their program to The Umbrellas of Cherbourg's soundtrack.

=== 2008–09 season: Injury and World Bronze ===
In the 2008–09 season, Virtue and Moir withdrew from both their Grand Prix events due to Virtue's medical condition; she had been diagnosed with chronic exertional compartment syndrome and underwent surgery in October 2008 to alleviate the condition. She returned to the ice at the start of December, which she later said was probably too early. At the 2009 Canadian Championships, their first competition of the season, they won their second back-to-back national title.

At the 2009 Four Continents Championships, Virtue and Moir finished second behind their friends and training partners, Americans Meryl Davis and Charlie White. At the 2009 World Championships, they won the bronze medal, after placing third in the compulsory dance, sixth in the original dance, and fourth in the free skate.

=== 2009–10 season: Olympic and World titles ===
Virtue/Moir started off the 2009–10 Olympic season at the 2009 Trophée Éric Bompard, finishing first by a margin of 16.07 points ahead of the silver medallists, Nathalie Péchalat and Fabian Bourzat. They also won the 2009 Skate Canada International with a combined score of 204.38 points, 19.31 points ahead of Péchalat/Bourzat. At that competition, they received the first 10.0 for ice dance under the ISU Judging System. They were second at the Grand Prix Final behind Davis and White.

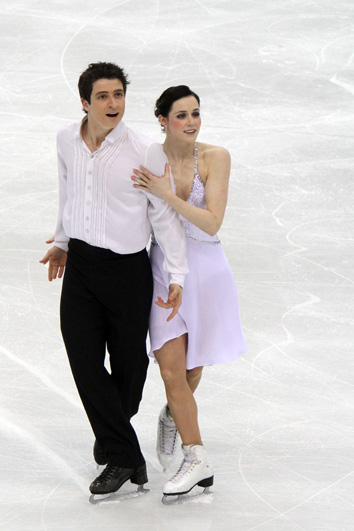
Virtue and Moir at the 2010 Worlds

In January 2010, Virtue and Moir won their third national title at the 2010 Canadian Championships, placing first in all three segments of the competition and earning 221.95 points overall, which was 37.25 ahead of silver medallists Vanessa Crone and Paul Poirier. They set Canadian records for free dance and for combined total.

Virtue and Moir competed in the ice dance competition at the 2010 Winter Olympics from February 19 through 22. They placed second in the compulsory dance, earning a new personal best score of 42.74 points, just 1.02 off the lead. They earned 68.41 points in the original dance, placing first in that segment of the competition. They scored 110.42 points in the free dance and won the gold medal overall with an insurmountable total score of 221.57, surpassing silver medallists Davis and White by 5.83 points. In the free dance, which they skated to Mahler's Symphony No. 5, they received four 10.00 marks from the judges in the program components, two for the performance execution and two for interpretation, a feat never before accomplished by a figure skater or team under the International Judging System. They became the first Canadian as well as the first North American ice dance team and the youngest dance team, at the ages of 20 (Virtue) and 22 (Moir), to win the Olympics, and the first ice dance team to win the Olympic gold on home ice. They were also the first ice dancers to win gold in their Olympic debut since the inaugural Olympic ice dance event in 1976.

Virtue/Moir competed at the 2010 World Championships and placed first in the compulsory dance with 44.13 points, improving their previous personal best. They also won the original dance with 70.27 points, a world record under the ISU Judging System. They placed second in the free dance with 110.03 points, 0.46 behind Davis and White. Overall they claimed their first World Championship title scoring 224.43 points, 1.40 ahead of the Americans. They received numerous 10.00 for program components marks in the original dance and in the free dance.

=== 2010–11 season: Injury and World Silver ===
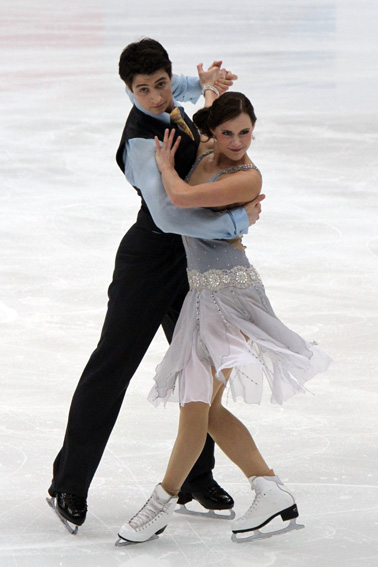
Virtue and Moir at 2011 Four Continents

For the 2010–11 Grand Prix season, Virtue and Moir were assigned to the 2010 Skate Canada International and to the 2010 Trophée Éric Bompard. Virtue underwent surgery in October 2010 to reduce the lingering pain in her shins and calves that is a result of chronic exertional compartment syndrome, leading to their withdrawal from the Grand Prix circuit. They also withdrew from the 2011 Canadian Championships because they did not have enough time to train after the surgery.

Virtue/Moir made their season debut at the 2011 Four Continents. They were in the lead following the short dance but withdrew midway through the free dance after Virtue felt tightness in her left quad muscle. Virtue stated, "The issue with my quad was actually coming from my pelvis and my back. [I]t seemed to be stemming from a particular lift we were doing, which was a split lift. Upon returning home to Michigan we changed that lift immediately, so now we do an upside-down position instead of a split." At the 2011 World Championships, they placed second overall by 3.48 points behind the American team of Davis and White.

Following the World Championships, Virtue experienced pain in her shins and calves. She decided against a third surgery and chose other methods to overcome the problem.

=== 2011–12 season: Second Four Continents and World titles ===
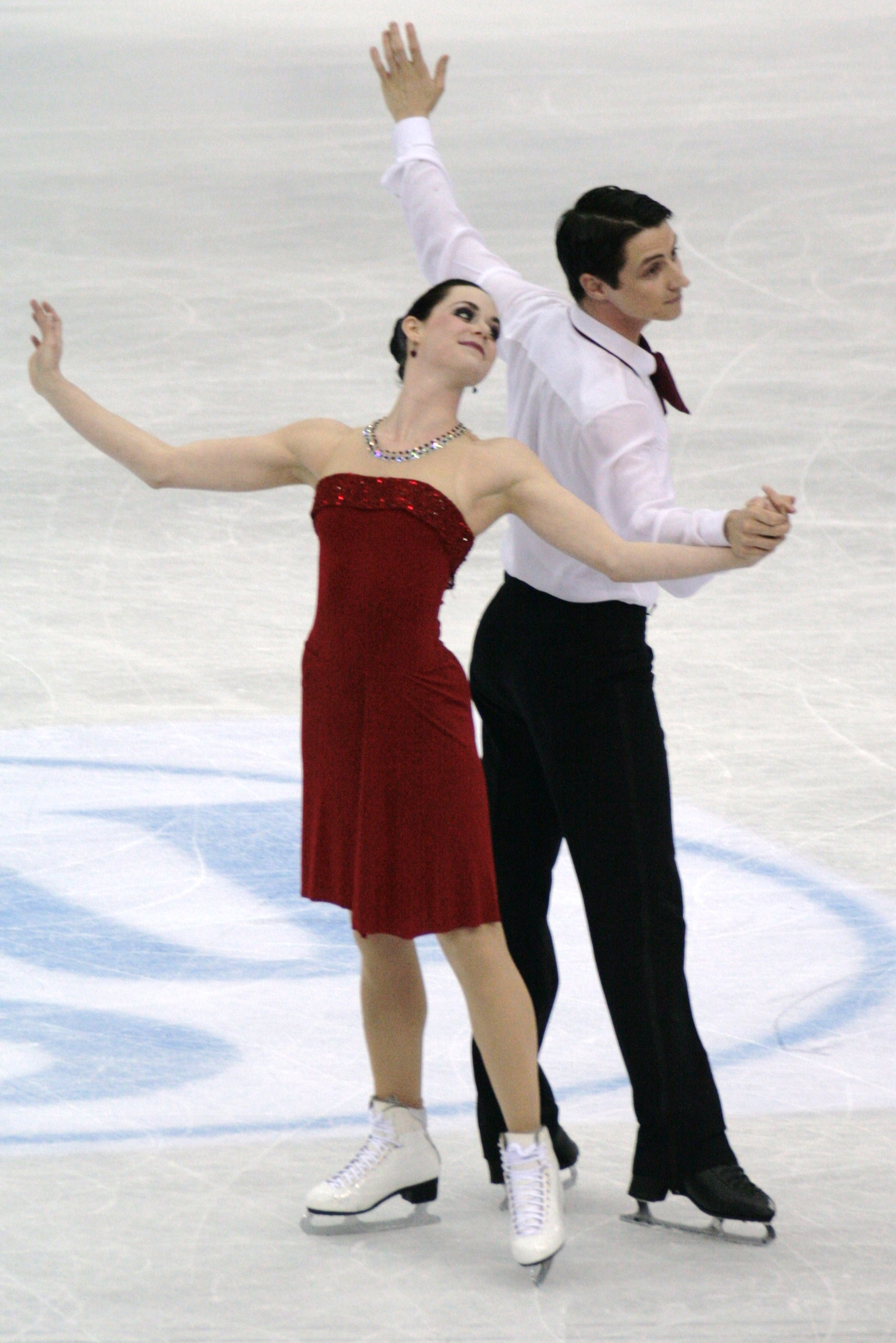
Virtue and Moir at the 2012 World Championships

Virtue/Moir were assigned to two Grand Prix events, 2011 Skate Canada and 2011 Trophée Éric Bompard, having declined a newly introduced option to compete in a third. They announced their music selections in August. The two won their first event of the season, 2011 Finlandia Trophy. They won both their Grand Prix events and qualified for the Grand Prix Final, where they finished second in both segments to win the silver medal. In late December 2011, the ISU acknowledged a scoring error in the free dance; had the scores been correctly calculated (+ 0.5 points), Virtue and Moir would have won that segment. The scores from the Grand Prix Final were left unchanged, however.

Virtue/Moir won their fourth national title in January 2012. In February, they competed at the 2012 Four Continents Championships. After a second place short dance, they rallied in the free dance to win their second Four Continents championships and first since 2008. It was also their first victory over training mates Davis and White since the 2010 World Championships. Virtue and Moir then competed at the 2012 World Championships and won the gold medal, finishing first in both segments ahead of silver medallists Davis and White.

Following Igor Shpilband's dismissal from the Arctic Edge Arena in June 2012, Virtue and Moir decided to remain at the rink with Marina Zueva and ended their collaboration with Shpilband.

=== 2012–13 season ===
Virtue and Moir withdrew from the 2012 Finlandia Trophy due to a slight muscle strain in Moir's neck. They were assigned to two Grand Prix events, the 2012 Skate Canada International and the 2012 Rostelecom Cup. At Skate Canada, they won the short dance with a score of 65.09, only 0.01 points ahead of Anna Cappellini and Luca Lanotte of Italy. They went on to win the competition with a total score of 169.41, which was 9.35 points ahead of the Italians.

At the Grand Prix Final, Virtue and Moir took the silver medal behind Davis and White. They decided to modify their "The Waltz Goes On" short dance, simplifying the storyline. The two debuted the modified short dance at the 2013 Canadian Championships, earning a score of 79.04. They won their fifth national title with a combined score of 187.19 after their Carmen-themed free dance. Virtue and Moir placed first in the short dance at the 2013 Four Continents Championships. During their free dance, Virtue felt cramping in her legs and paused the performance; they resumed after about three minutes and finished second to Davis and White. Virtue and Moir also finished second to Davis and White at the 2013 World Championships in their hometown of London, Ontario.

=== 2013–14 season: Two Olympic silver medals ===
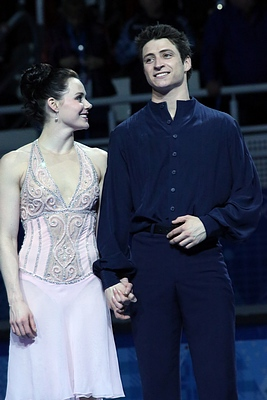
2014 Winter Olympics

Virtue/Moir started their season at the 2013 Finlandia Trophy and won the gold medal. They were assigned to two Grand Prix events for the season, the 2013 Skate Canada International and the 2013 Trophée Éric Bompard, and won both competitions. They finished with a world record score in the Grand Prix Final (190.00) that was beaten minutes later by Davis/White.

During the airing of the 2014 Canadian National Championships on TSN, where they won their sixth national title, Virtue and Moir stated that they could be retiring after the 2014 Winter Olympics in Sochi, Russia. At the Sochi games, they won silver in both the ice dance and team skate events. The second-place finish was coloured by controversy about the coaching and judging. The French sports publication L’Équipe alleged that the US and Russian judges had conspired to ensure gold for Russia in the team event and gold for Americans Davis and White in the ice dance competition. Notably, after the individual short dance event where Virtue and Moir were two points behind Davis and White, the creator of the Finnstep (required pattern dance that season), ice dancer Petri Kokko, spoke out on Twitter to support Virtue and Moir. In addition, coach Marina Zoueva's apparent conflict of interest in coaching both the first- and second-place ice dancers provoked questions about whether she had displayed favouritism to the Americans (especially after she chose to march in the opening ceremony with the US team) and had devoted less coaching time to the Canadians. Although Virtue and Moir later admitted concerns about the coaching, they also congratulated the American pair on their Olympic victory.

Virtue and Moir decided not to compete at the 2014 World Championships.

=== 2016–17 season: Undefeated comeback season and coaching change ===
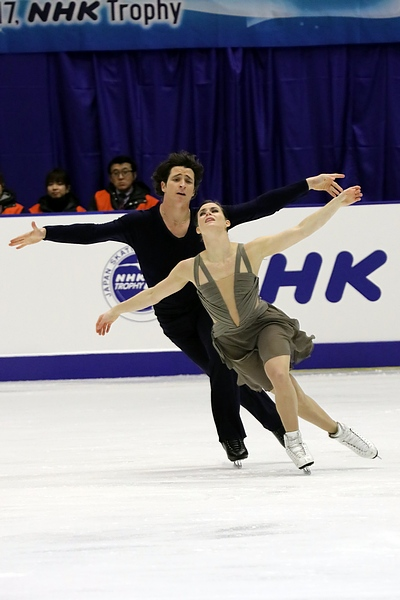
Free dance at the 2016 NHK Trophy

On February 20, 2016, following a two-year break from the sport, Virtue and Moir announced on CBC's Road to the Olympic Games that they planned to return to competition for the 2016–17 figure skating season and that they had moved to Montreal, with former competitors Marie-France Dubreuil and Patrice Lauzon as their new coaches. Their first assignment back during the 2016–17 ISU Grand Prix of Figure Skating season was the 2016 Skate Canada International where they won gold with a combined total score of 189.06. In November 2016, they set a new record total score of 195.84 (including a world record short dance mark of 79.47) at the 2016 NHK Trophy competition in Japan. They set the highest scores at a Grand Prix event. Two weeks later, they topped those scores, receiving 80.5 in the short dance and 197.22 total at the Grand Prix Final in Marseille, France, which they won for the first time in their career.

At the 2017 Canadian Figure Skating Championships in January, Virtue and Moir won their seventh national title with a combined score of 203.45, setting Canadian records in the short dance, free dance, and total points. At the 2017 Four Continents Figure Skating Championships in South Korea in February, they won their third title, setting a new personal best in the free dance with 117.20 points and earning 196.95 points overall.

Virtue and Moir broke their own world record short dance score at the 2017 World Championships in Helsinki. They received a score of 82.43 and had a huge 5.5-point lead over reigning champions and training partners Gabriella Papadakis and Guillaume Cizeron. They placed second behind Papadakis/Cizeron in the free dance with Moir tripping. Moir said, "I got back up and Tessa said a really funny joke to me, it automatically put me back on track and I just kept going." Overall they totaled 198.62 points, setting yet another world record and winning their third title as world champions. For the first time in their competitive career, Virtue/Moir were undefeated for an entire season.

=== 2017–18 season: Two Olympic gold medals ===
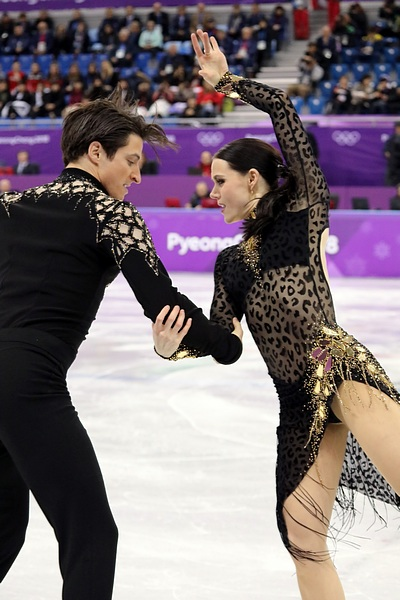
World record in short dance at 2018 Olympics

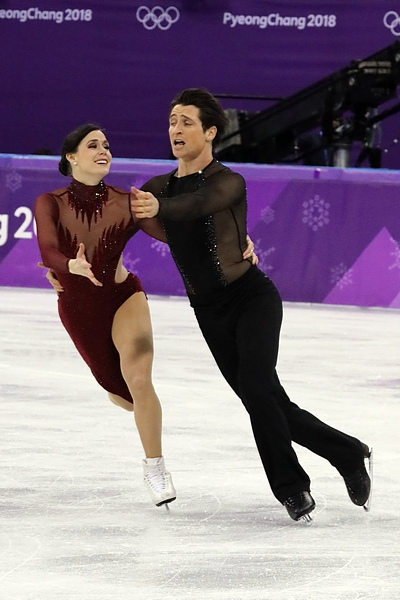
Free dance at 2018 Winter Olympics

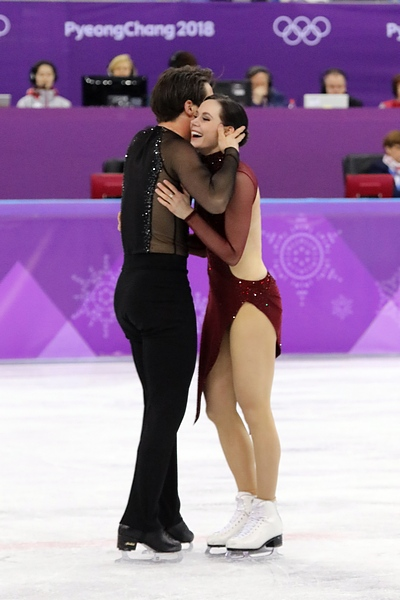
Free dance at 2018 Winter Olympics

For the 2017–2018 season, Virtue and Moir chose The Rolling Stones, the Eagles, and Santana for their short dance, and skated to the Moulin Rouge! soundtrack for their free dance. Virtue and Moir started their season at the Autumn Classic International in September. Their Grand Prix assignments were Skate Canada International and the NHK Trophy, and they won both competitions, scoring 199.86 and 198.64, respectively. At the 2017 Grand Prix Final, Virtue and Moir lost for the first time since their return to competition, finishing second to training mates and main rivals Gabriella Papadakis and Guillaume Cizeron of France, who had a half-point lead after the short dance.

"Virtue and Moir have pushed the ice dance envelope with their athleticism and intricate spins and footwork. Lauzon was asked when Canada will see another dance team like Virtue and Moir. 'It will be a long time,' he said. 'They're a once-in-a-generation talent.' And of course, their palpable chemistry is unparalleled. The 28-year-old Virtue and Moir, 30, are two of Canada's most recognizable Olympians, and have been melting hearts since they won gold in Vancouver. ... Canada's favourite couple that isn't a couple has maintained they're friends and 'business partners' despite fans' best wishes. They have captivated viewers with their chemistry and storytelling on skates, a byproduct of a partnership that spans 20 years."

— The Canadian Press, February 19, 2018

Virtue and Moir competed at the 2018 Canadian National Championships. They debuted their revamped free dance, adding new choreography and music for a more dramatic performance. There, they captured their 8th national title with a combined score of 209.82, after having a nearly perfect short dance and getting a perfect score on the free dance. After the competition, they changed a "risque" lift in their Moulin Rouge routine that had involved Virtue's legs wrapped around Moir's head. At the Olympics, they performed the modified lift during the team event but went back to the original version for the individual ice dance event.

On January 16, they were named the Canadian flag bearers for the 2018 Winter Olympics in Pyeongchang, marking the first time a Canadian man and woman carried the country's flag together into an Olympic opening ceremony. By placing first in both the short dance and free dance segments of the competition, Virtue and Moir won gold as part of Canada's team in the Olympic figure skating team event. This being their fourth Olympic medal, they tied the record for the most ever won by a figure skater. In the individual event, Virtue and Moir topped their own record score for the short dance, putting them into first place. They then placed second in the free dance, but their score was enough to win them their second individual Olympic title on February 20, 2018, exactly two years after announcing their competitive comeback. They also broke the world record for overall score, which had been set by Papadakis/Cizeron minutes before. This was Virtue and Moir's fifth Olympic medal, making them the most decorated Olympic figure skaters in history.

== Non-competitive career ==
In October 2010, Virtue, Moir, and co-writer Steve Milton published a book about their career called Tessa and Scott: Our Journey from Childhood Dream to Gold. In late 2013, they filmed their TV show, Tessa and Scott, which focuses on their training for the Olympics. The show aired on W Network in January 2014.

Virtue and Moir toured with Stars on Ice in Canada and Japan in the offseason since 2010 and during their break from competition. They performed in ice shows such as Festa on Ice, Shall We Dance On Ice, and All That Skate. They also participated in Art on Ice in Switzerland and went on Gold Medal Plate auction trips multiple times.

She and Moir co-produced and skated in their own ice skating show, The Thank You Canada Tour in 2018. Following on from that success, they co-produced the Rock the Rink tour in 2019.

In 2015, Hillberg & Berk announced their collaboration with Tessa Virtue. In October of the same year, they launched Tessa Virtue collection of jewelry, which she helped design.

In 2017, BonLook announced a glasses collaboration with Virtue. The BonLook X Tessa Virtue collection was launched in January 2018.

Throughout Virtue and Moir's competitive skating career they have been sponsored by many Canadian companies; these include Visa, Air Canada, Acura West, Lindt, and General Mills. Virtue has been individually sponsored by companies including Adidas, Nivea (as its first Canadian brand advertiser), Colgate, and MAC Cosmetics.

== Records and achievements (with Moir) ==
Olympics:

- The most decorated figure skaters in Olympic history
- The fourth most decorated Canadian Olympians ever
- The first and only team to take ice dance gold in their Olympic debut
- The youngest team to ever take ice dance gold at the Olympics
- The first and only ice dance team to ever win Olympic gold on home ice
- The first ice dance team from North America to take ice dance Olympic gold, breaking Europe's 34-year streak
- The first former junior World champions to win Olympic gold in ice dance
- The first figure skaters in 38 years to win three Olympic golds
- The second ice dance team to win two individual Olympic gold medals and the first one to do it in nonconsecutive Olympics
- The first duo to carry the Canadian flag at an Olympic opening ceremony

Record scores:

- The first ice dance team to receive a 10.0 for a program component score under the new ISU Judging System.
- The first team to receive four 10.0s from the judges in any figure skating discipline (under the International Judging System)
- The first team to break the 80-point mark in the short dance in an international competition (2016–17 Grand Prix Final).
- Current record holders for the highest technical score in a short dance with 44.53 established at 2018 Winter Olympics
- Historical record holders for the original dance

In general:

- The first and only ice dance team to achieve a Career Super Grand Slam under the current ISU judging system. They are the first and only ice dance team to win all major ISU championship titles including the Junior Grand Prix Series and Final, World Junior Championships, Grand Prix Series and Final, Four Continents Championships, World Championships, and Winter Olympic Games
- The only ice dance team to win World titles and Olympic gold medals under both the old compulsory & original dance system and the new short/rhythm dance system
- The most decorated Canadian ice dance team ever
- The longest-standing ice dance team in Canadian history
- The first and only Canadians to win the Junior Grand Prix Final and Junior World Championship
- The first and only ice dance team to win the World Championships and Grand Prix Final as both seniors and juniors
- Three-time senior World champions
- Seven-time senior World medallists
- Eight-time Canadian senior ice dance champions
- Ten-time Canadian senior ice dance medallists

=== List of world record scores set by Virtue/Moir ===
Combined total records
Date	Score	Event
April 30, 2011	181.79	2011 World Championships
December 7, 2013	190.00	2013–14 Grand Prix Final
November 27, 2016	195.84	2016 NHK Trophy
December 10, 2016	197.22	2016–17 Grand Prix Final
April 1, 2017	198.62	2017 World Championships
October 28, 2017	199.86	2017 Skate Canada International
February 20, 2018	206.07	2018 Winter Olympics
Short dance records
Date	Score	Event
February 17, 2011	69.40	2011 Four Continents Championships
April 29, 2011	74.29	2011 World Championships
December 6, 2013	77.59	2013–14 Grand Prix Final
November 26, 2016	79.47	2016 NHK Trophy
December 9, 2016	80.50	2016–17 Grand Prix Final
March 31, 2017	82.43	2017 World Championships
October 27, 2017	82.68	2017 Skate Canada International
February 19, 2018	83.67	2018 Winter Olympics
Free dance records
Date	Score	Event
April 30, 2011	107.50	2011 World Championships
December 11, 2011	112.33	2011–12 Grand Prix Final
February 17, 2014	114.66	2014 Winter Olympics
Historic records
March 25, 2010	70.27	2010 World Championships (original dance)

== Awards and honours ==
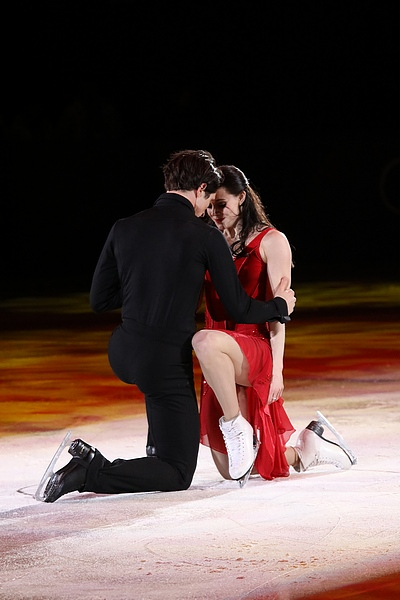
Exhibition gala at 2018 Olympics

- Virtue and Moir were inducted in London (ON) Sports Hall of Fame in 2010 after winning gold in the 2010 Winter Olympic Games in Vancouver. It was a somewhat unusual decision because the guidelines for athletes to be considered for induction is retirement from their sport for a period of two years while Virtue and Moir were just at the beginning of their career. Furthermore, the induction event was moved into September that year so as not to interfere with the upcoming skating season.
- Virtue and Moir were honoured as the Canadian Olympic athletes of the year by CBC in December 2017.
- In early May 2018, Virtue and Moir were awarded Partnership of the Year, along with pairs skaters Meagan Duhamel and Eric Radford, at the 45th Sports Québec gala.
- Following 2018 PyeongChang Winter Olympics, Tessa Virtue was named one of the most famous female athletes in the world by ESPN. Virtue is the highest placed Canadian female athlete and second highest placed female winter sports athlete.
- In December 2018, Virtue and Moir were inducted into Canada's Walk of Fame in the Sports and Athletics category.
- On October 23, 2019, Virtue, together with Moir, received a Doctor of Laws, honoris causa (LLD) from The University of Western Ontario at the university's 314th Convocation, where she attended briefly.
- On November 27, 2020, Governor General of Canada named Virtue and Moir as Members of the Order of Canada.
- In 2023 they were awarded the Order of Sport, marking induction into Canada's Sports Hall of Fame.

== Programs ==
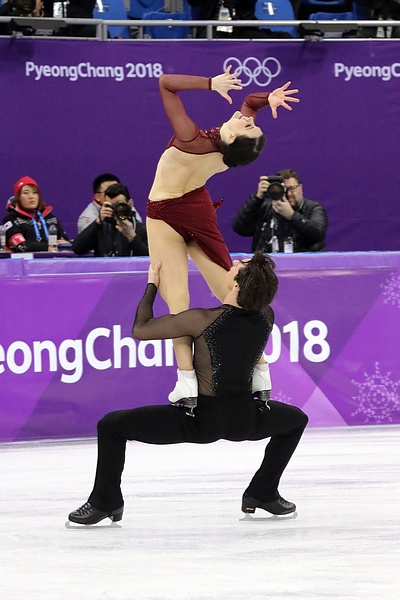
Lift during Moulin Rouge! free dance at 2018 Olympics

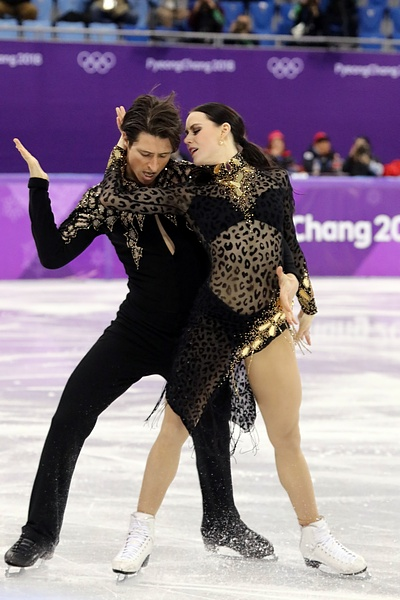
Latin short dance at 2018 Olympics and world record

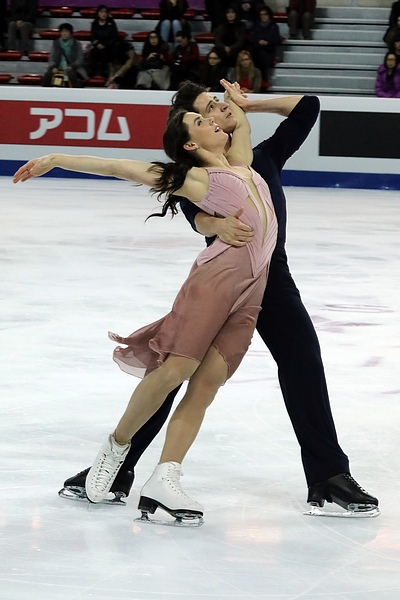
Free dance at 2016 Grand Prix Final

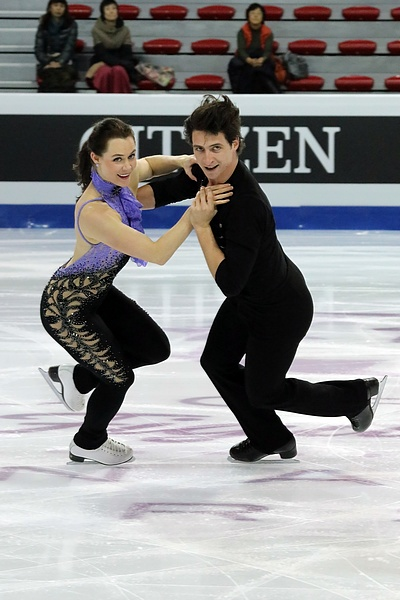
Short dance at 2016 Grand Prix Final

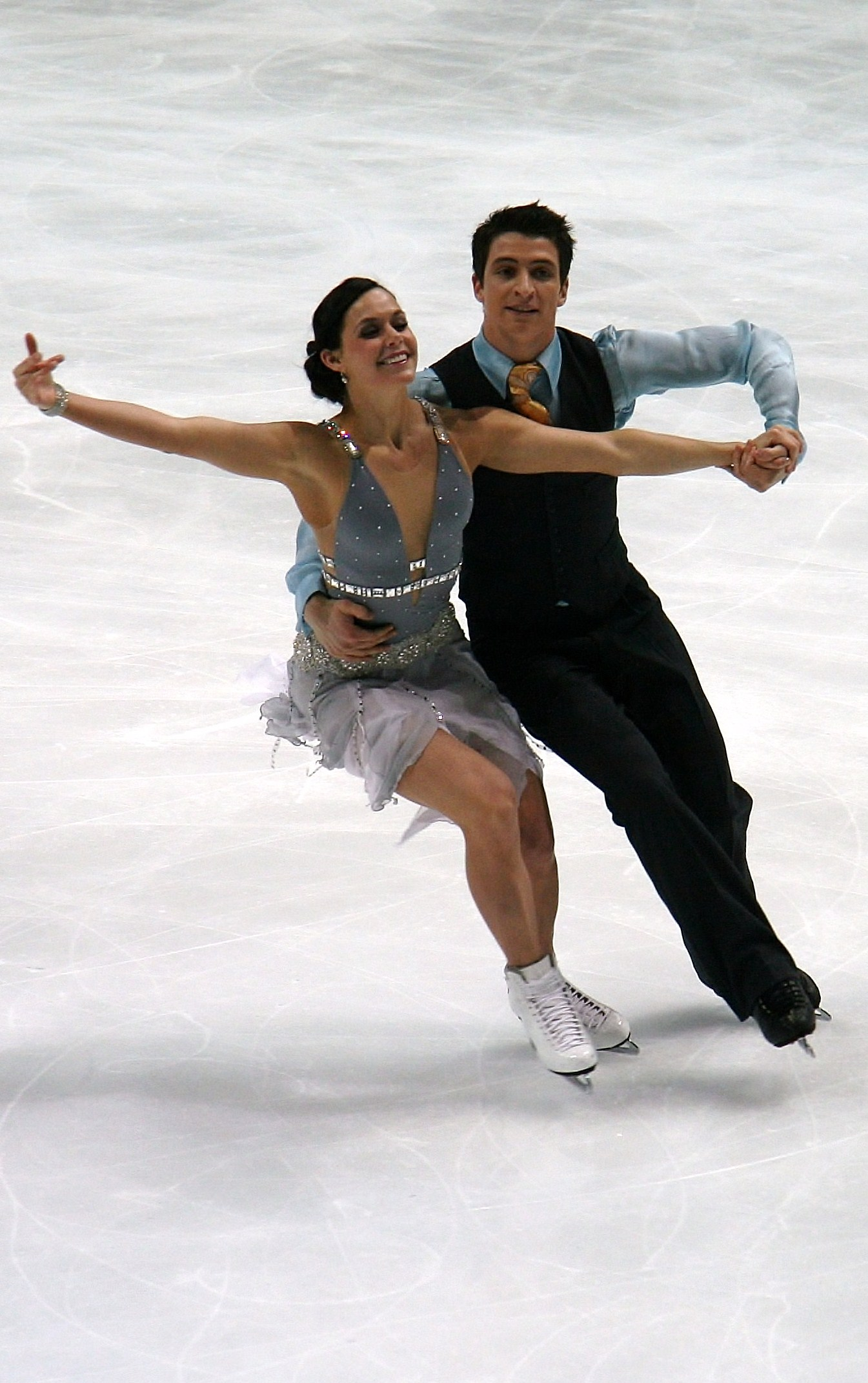
Short dance at 2011 Worlds

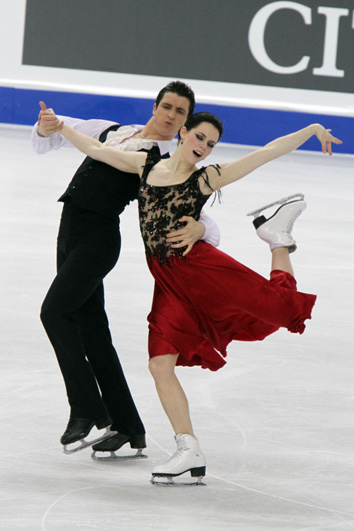
Original dance at 2010 Worlds

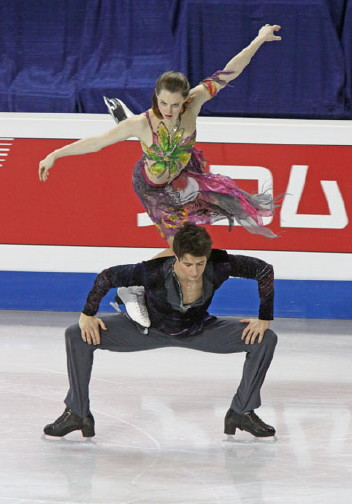
Lift "the Goose" during free dance at 2009 Four Continents

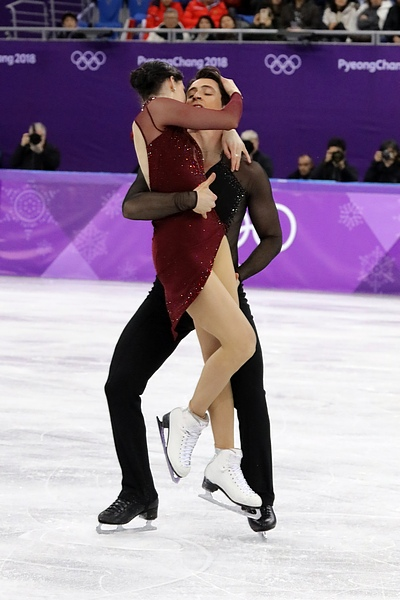
2018 Winter Olympic Games in PyeongChang

=== Post-2018 ===
Season	Exhibition
2018–2019	Dark Times by The Weeknd ft. Ed Sheeran, choreo. by Samuel Chouinard; You Rock My World by Michael Jackson, choreo. by Samuel Chouinard
2019-2020	Wish You Were Here by Pink Floyd, choreo. by Guillaume Côté; Fix You by Coldplay, choreo. by Charlie White

=== Pre-2018 ===
Season	Short dance	Free dance	Exhibition
2017–2018	Samba: Sympathy for the Devil by The Rolling Stones; Rhumba: Hotel California by the Eagles; Cha Cha: Oye Cómo Va by Santana	The Show Must Go On; El Tango De Roxanne; Come What May by David Baerwald, Kevin Gilbert performed by Ewan McGregor, Nicole Kidman choreo. by Marie-France Dubreuil, David Wilson and Samuel Chouinard	I Dreamed a Dream (from Les Misérables) performed by Anne Hathaway choreo. by Tessa Virtue, Scott Moir; Moulin Rouge! medley; You Rock My World by Michael Jackson choreo. by Samuel Chouinard; Long Time Running by The Tragically Hip choreo. by Tessa Virtue, Scott Moir
2016–2017	Hip Hop: Kiss; Blues: 5 Women; Blues/Rock: Purple Rain by Prince	Pilgrims on a Long Journey by Cœur de pirate; Shadows/You Upset My Life composed by Karl Hugo; Latch (acoustic) by Disclosure performed by Sam Smith choreo. by Marie-France Dubreuil, David Wilson	Sorry by Justin Bieber choreo. by Samuel Chouinard
2015–2016	Did not compete this season		Sorry by Justin Bieber choreo. by Samuel Chouinard; What's Love Got to Do with It written by Terry Britten, Graham Lyle covered by Miku Graham, Michael Shand choreo. by Marie-France Dubreuil, David Wilson; Have Yourself a Merry Little Christmas; Carmen by Georges Bizet; Rise Up by Andra Day
2014–2015	Did not compete this season		Say It Right by Nelly Furtado; Stay by Rihanna; Good Kisser by Usher choreo. by Marie-France Dubreuil, Patrice Lauzon, and Samuel Chouinard; How Will I Know cover by Sam Smith choreo. by Jeffrey Buttle; All We Have; Maneater; Hip Hip Chin Chin by Club des Belugas
2013–2014	Foxtrot: Dream a Little Dream of Me by Ella Fitzgerald, Louis Armstrong; Quickstep: Muskrat Ramble by Louis Armstrong and His Hot Five; Foxtrot: Cheek to Cheek by Ella Fitzgerald, Louis Armstrong choreo. by Marina Zueva, Jean-Marc Généreux	The Seasons Autumn - Adagio by Alexander Glazunov; Piano Concerto No.1 in B Flat minor, op.23-1 by Tchaikovsky; Waltz in Concerto No. 2; The Seasons Summer - Coda by Alexander Glazunov; Piano Concerto in F by Alexander Scriabin choreo. by Marina Zueva, Sergei Volodin, Jennifer Swan	Into the Mystic by Van Morrison choreo. by Tessa Virtue, Scott Moir; Top Hat and Tails by Louis Armstrong, Ella Fitzgerald choreo. by Marie-France Dubreuil, Patrice Lauzon; Stay by Rihanna; Try by Pink
2012–2013	And The Waltz Goes On by Anthony Hopkins	Carmen Suite No. V. Carmen's Entrance and Habanera No. 11.Adagio No. IX. Torero No. VI. Scene by Rodion Shchedrin choreo. by Marina Zueva, Jennifer Swan	Carmen by Georges Bizet; Stay by Rihanna; Hallelujah by Jeff Buckley
2011–2012	Samba: Hip Hip Chin Chin by Club des Belugas; Rhumba: Temptation by Diana Krall; Samba: Mujer Latina by Thalía	Funny Face by George Gershwin; Basal Metabolism by Adolph Deutsch; 'S Wonderful by George Gershwin	Hallelujah by Jeff Buckley; Ain't No Mountain High Enough by Marvin Gaye, Tammi Terrell; I Want to Hold Your Hand by The Beatles cover by T. V. Carpio
2010–2011	Tango: Schenkst Du Beim Tango Mir Dein Herz by Dajos Bela & Sein Tanzorchester; Waltz: Nights and Days soundtrack by Waldemar Kazanecki	Hip Hip Chin Chin by Club des Belugas; Temptation by Diana Krall; Mujer Latina by Thalía	I Want to Hold Your Hand by The Beatles cover by T. V. Carpio; Samba medley
	Original dance		
2009–2010	Farrucas by Pepe Romero	Symphony No. 5 by Gustav Mahler arranged by Ryner Stoetzer	Everybody Dance Now by C+C Music Factory; Symphony No. 5 by Gustav Mahler; Jack & Diane by John Mellencamp choreo. by David Wilson; The Great Gig in the Sky by Pink Floyd; Nights and Days soundtrack by Waldemar Kazanecki
2008–2009	Overture; Won't You Charleston with Me? (from The Boy Friend)	The Great Gig in the Sky; Money by Pink Floyd	Jack & Diane by John Mellencamp choreo. by David Wilson
2007–2008	Dark Eyes (Ochi Chornyje) by Roby Lakatos	The Umbrellas of Cherbourg (selections from Finale and La Gare (Guy s'en va) as well as John Williams' I Will Wait For You) by Michel Legrand	I Could Have Danced All Night by Jamie Cullum; Dare You to Move by Switchfoot; Tennessee Waltz by Holly Cole; Black Magic Woman by Santana
2006–2007	Assassination Tango Building the Bullet by Luis Bacalov	Valse triste by Jean Sibelius	Black Magic Woman by Santana; Tennessee Waltz by Holly Cole; Winter Wonderland
2005–2006	Beautiful Maria by The Mambo Kings; Do You Only Wanna Dance by Julio Daviel Big Band	Malagueña by Raúl Di Blasio	No Me Ames by Jennifer Lopez, Marc Anthony; Everybody Dance Now by C+C Music Factory
2004–2005	Call Me Irresponsible by Bobby Darin; Puttin' On the Ritz	Adiós Nonino by Astor Piazzolla	Everybody Dance Now by C+C Music Factory
2003–2004	Tears on My Pillow by Little Anthony; Tutti Frutti by Little Richard	Russian medley by Quartetto Gelato	Tears on My Pillow by Little Anthony; Tutti Frutti by Little Richard
2002–2003	Les Poissons; Concerto Sopra Motivi dell'Opera La Favorita di Donizetti-Variazioni by Quartetto Gelato	Magalenha by Sérgio Mendes; Eres Todo En Mi by Ana Gabriel; Tres Deseos by Gloria Estefan	

== Competitive highlights ==
=== Ice dance with Scott Moir ===
- GP – Event of the ISU Grand Prix Series
- CS – Event of the ISU Challenger Series
- WD – Withdrew from event
- Medals at team events are awarded for the team result only. The individual placement at the ISU World Team Trophy is listed in brackets.

Competition placements since the 2006–07 season
Season	2006–07	2007–08	2008–09	2009–10	2010–11	2011–12	2012–13	2013–14	2016–17	2017–18
Winter Olympics				1st				2nd		1st
Winter Olympics (Team event)								2nd		1st
World Championships	6th	2nd	3rd	1st	2nd	1st	2nd		1st	
Four Continents Championships	3rd	1st	2nd		WD	1st	2nd		1st	
Grand Prix Final		4th		2nd		2nd	2nd	2nd	1st	2nd
Canadian Championships	2nd	1st	1st	1st		1st	1st	1st	1st	1st
World Team Trophy			2nd (2nd)			3rd (2nd)				
GP NHK Trophy		2nd							1st	1st
GP Rostelecom Cup							1st			
GP Skate Canada	2nd	1st		1st		1st	1st	1st	1st	1st
GP Trophée Éric Bompard	4th			1st		1st		1st		
CS Autumn Classic									1st	1st
CS Finlandia Trophy						1st		1st		

Competition placements until the 2005–06 season
Season	2001–02	2002–03	2003–04	2004–05	2005–06
Four Continents Championships					3rd
World Junior Championships			11th	2nd	1st
Junior Grand Prix Final				2nd	1st
Canadian Championships		7th J	1st J	4th	3rd
JGP Andorra					1st
JGP Canada					1st
JGP China				1st	
JGP Croatia			4th		
JGP France				2nd	
JGP Slovakia			6th		

== Detailed results ==
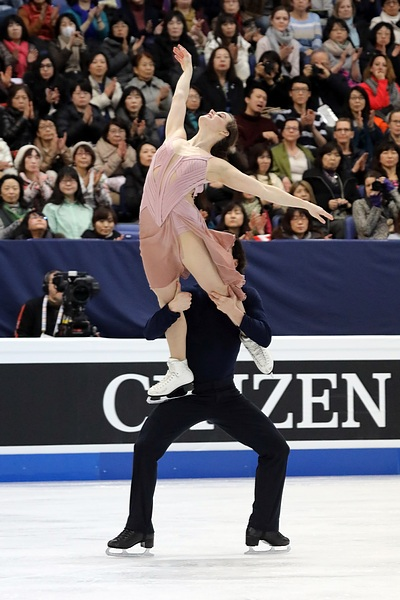
Tessa Virtue and Scott Moir at the 2017 World Championships

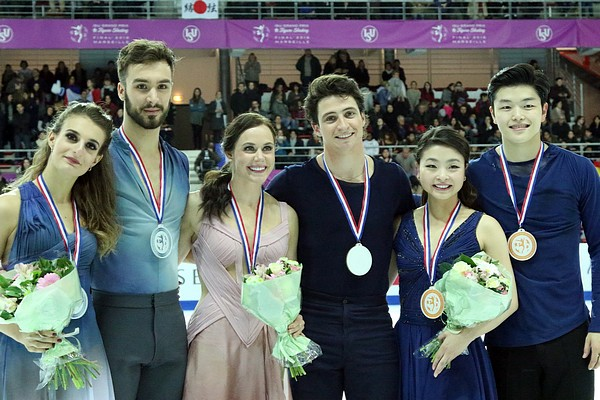
The gold, silver, and bronze medalists in the ice dance event at the 2016 Grand Prix Final: Tessa Virtue and Scott Moir of Canada (center), Gabriella Papadakis and Guillaume Cizeron of France (left), and Alex and Maia Shibutani of the United States (right)

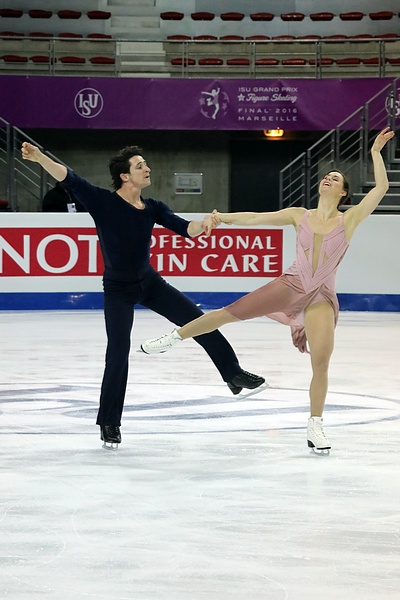
Tessa Virtue and Scott Moir at the 2016 Grand Prix Final

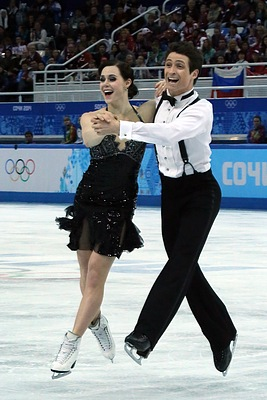
Tessa Virtue and Scott Moir at the 2014 Winter Olympics

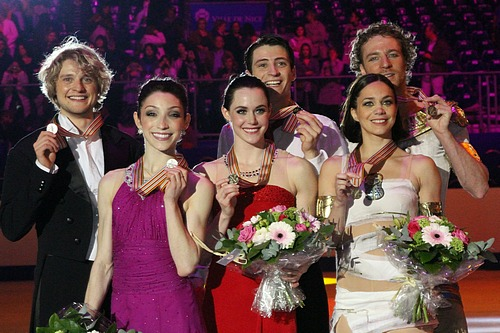
The gold, silver, and bronze medalists in the ice dance event at the 2012 World Championships: Tessa Virtue and Scott Moir of Canada (center), Meryl Davis and Charlie White of the United States (left), and Nathalie Péchalat and Fabian Bourzat of France (right)

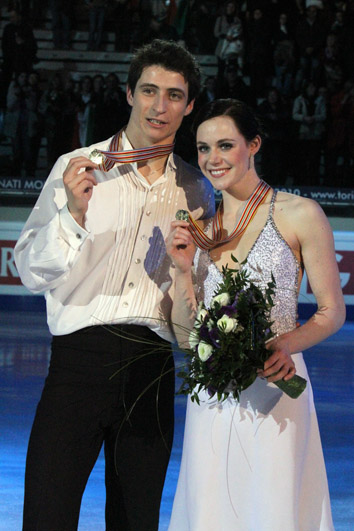
Tessa Virtue and Scott Moir at the 2010 World Championships

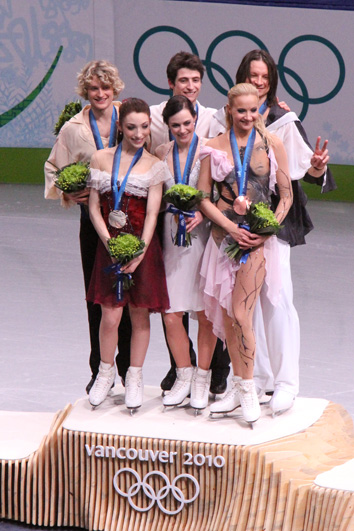
The gold, silver, and bronze medalists in the ice dance event at the 2010 Winter Olympics: Tessa Virtue and Scott Moir of Canada (center), Meryl Davis and Charlie White of the United States (left), and Oksana Domnina and Maxim Shabalin of Russia (right)

- TSS – Total segment score highlighted in bold
- TES – Technical element score
- PCS – Program component score

ISU personal best scores in the +5/-5 GOE System
Segment	Type	Score	Event
Total	**TSS**	**206.07**	2018 Winter Olympics
Rhythm dance	**TSS**	**83.67**	2018 Winter Olympics
Rhythm dance	TES	44.53	2018 Winter Olympics
Rhythm dance	PCS	39.14	2018 Winter Olympics
Free dance	**TSS**	**122.40**	2018 Winter Olympics
Free dance	TES	63.35	2018 Winter Olympics
Free dance	PCS	59.05	2018 Winter Olympics

ISU personal bests in the +3/-3 GOE System (from 2010–11)
Segment	Type	Score	Event
Total	**TSS**	**224.43**	2010 World Championships
Short dance	**TSS**	**44.13**	2010 World Championships
Short dance	TES	22.22	2010 World Championships
Short dance	PCS	21.91	2010 World Championships
Free dance	**TSS**	**70.27**	2010 World Championships
Free dance	TES	34.74	2010 World Championships
Free dance	PCS	35.97	2010 World Championships

=== Senior level in +3/-3 GOE system after 2010 ===
- Small medals for the short dance and free dance are only awarded at ISU Championships.
- Medals at team events are awarded for the team result only. The individual placement at the ISU World Team Trophy is listed in parentheses.

Results in the 2010–11 season
Date	Event	SD		FD		Total	
Date	Event	P	Score	P	Score	P	Score
Feb 15–20, 2011	(Taiwan) 2011 Four Continents Championships	1	69.40	–	–	–	WD
Apr 24 – May 1, 2011	(Russia) 2011 World Championships	1	74.29	2	107.50	2	181.79

Results in the 2011–12 season
Date	Event	SD		FD		Total	
Date	Event	P	Score	P	Score	P	Score
Oct 6–9, 2011	(Finland) 2011 Finlandia Trophy	1	68.74	1	101.59	1	170.33
Oct 27–30, 2011	2011 Skate Canada International	1	71.61	1	106.73	1	178.34
Nov 17–20, 2011	(France) 2011 Trophée Éric Bompard	1	71.18	1	105.75	1	176.93
Dec 8–11, 2011	(Canada) 2011–12 Grand Prix Final	2	71.01	1	112.33	2	183.44
Jan 16–22, 2012	(Canada) 2012 Canadian Championships	1	68.41	1	111.61	1	180.02
Feb 7–12, 2012	(United States) 2012 Four Continents Championships	2	71.60	1	111.24	1	182.84
Mar 26 – Apr 1, 2012	(France) 2012 World Championships	1	72.31	1	110.34	1	182.65
Apr 18–22, 2012	(Japan) 2012 World Team Trophy	2	69.93	2	107.83	3 (2)	177.76

Results in the 2012–13 season
Date	Event	SD		FD		Total	
Date	Event	P	Score	P	Score	P	Score
Oct 26–28, 2012	2012 Skate Canada International	1	65.09	1	104.32	1	169.41
Nov 8–11, 2012	(Russia) 2012 Rostelecom Cup	1	70.65	1	103.34	1	173.99
Dec 6–9, 2012	(Russia) 2012–13 Grand Prix Final	2	71.27	2	108.56	2	179.83
Jan 13–20, 2013	(Canada) 2013 Canadian Championships	1	79.04	1	108.19	1	187.23
Feb 6–11, 2013	(Japan) 2013 Four Continents Championships	1	75.12	2	109.20	2	184.32
Mar 10–17, 2013	(Canada) 2013 World Championships	2	73.87	2	111.17	2	185.04

Results in the 2013–14 season
Date	Event	SD		FD		Total	
Date	Event	P	Score	P	Score	P	Score
Oct 4–6, 2013	(Finland) 2013 Finlandia Trophy	1	67.23	1	100.64	1	167.87
Oct 25–27, 2013	2013 Skate Canada International	1	73.15	1	107.88	1	181.03
Nov 15–17, 2013	(France) 2013 Trophée Éric Bompard	1	75.31	1	105.65	1	180.96
Dec 5–8, 2013	(Japan) 2013–14 Grand Prix Final	2	77.59	2	112.41	2	190.00
Jan 9–15, 2014	(Canada) 2014 Canadian Championships	1	76.16	1	117.87	1	194.03
Feb 6–22, 2014	(Russia) 2014 Winter Olympics (Team event)	2	72.98	2	107.56	2	—N/a
Feb 6–22, 2014	(Russia) 2014 Winter Olympics	2	76.33	2	114.66	2	190.99

Results in the 2016–17 season
Date	Event	SD		FD		Total	
Date	Event	P	Score	P	Score	P	Score
Sep 29 – Oct 1, 2016	(Canada) 2016 CS Autumn Classic International	1	77.72	1	111.48	1	189.20
Oct 28–30, 2016	2016 Skate Canada International	1	77.23	2	111.83	1	189.06
Nov 25–27, 2016	(Japan) 2016 NHK Trophy	1	79.47	1	116.37	1	195.84
Dec 8–11, 2016	(France) 2016–17 Grand Prix Final	1	80.50	1	116.72	1	197.22
Jan 16–22, 2017	(Canada) 2017 Canadian Championships	1	84.36	1	119.09	1	203.45
Feb 15–19, 2017	(South Korea) 2017 Four Continents Championships	1	79.75	1	117.20	1	196.95
Mar 29 – Apr 2, 2017	(Finland) 2017 World Championships	1	82.43	2	116.19	1	198.62

Results in the 2017–18 season
Date	Event	SD		FD		Total	
Date	Event	P	Score	P	Score	P	Score
Sep 20–23, 2017	(Canada) 2017 CS Autumn Classic International	1	79.961	1	115.80	1	195.76
Oct 27–29, 2017	2017 Skate Canada International	1	82.68	1	117.18	1	199.86
Nov 10–12, 2017	(Japan) 2017 NHK Trophy	1	80.92	1	117.72	1	198.64
Dec 7–10, 2017	(Japan) 2017–18 Grand Prix Final	2	81.53	2	118.33	2	199.86
Jan 8–14, 2018	(Canada) 2018 Canadian Championships	1	85.12	1	124.70	1	209.82
Feb 9–12, 2018	(South Korea) 2018 Winter Olympics (Team event)	1	80.51	1	118.10	1	—N/a
Feb 19–20, 2018	(South Korea) 2018 Winter Olympics	1	83.67	2	122.40	1	206.07

=== Senior level in +3/-3 GOE system until 2010 ===
Results in the 2006–07 season
Date	Event	CD		OD		FD		Total	
Date	Event	P	Score	P	Score	P	Score	P	Score
Nov 2–5, 2006	2006 Skate Canada International	3	29.51	2	54.12	3	88.29	2	171.92
Nov 17–19, 2006	(France) 2006 Trophée Éric Bompard	5	31.29	8	45.08	4	83.75	4	160.12
Jan 15–21, 2007	(Canada) 2007 Canadian Championships	2	34.98	2	59.71	2	94.80	2	189.49
Feb 7–10, 2007	(United States) 2007 Four Continents Championships	4	33.41	3	57.49	3	93.99	3	184.89
Mar 20–25, 2007	(Japan) 2007 World Championships	9	31.45	6	57.11	6	95.38	6	183.94

Results in the 2007–08 season
Date	Event	CD		OD		FD		Total	
Date	Event	P	Score	P	Score	P	Score	P	Score
Nov 1–4, 2007	2007 Skate Canada International	1	36.25	1	61.20	1	99.62	1	197.07
Nov 28 – Dec 2, 2007	(Japan) 2007 NHK Trophy	2	34.67	1	62.04	1	100.18	2	196.89
Dec 13–16, 2007	(Italy) 2007–08 Grand Prix Final	–	–	4	61.14	4	98.26	4	163.40
Jan 16–20, 2008	(Canada) 2008 Canadian Championships	1	40.04	1	65.29	1	103.76	1	209.09
Feb 11–17, 2008	(South Korea) 2008 Four Continents Championships	1	38.22	1	65.02	1	104.08	1	207.32
Mar 16–23, 2008	(Sweden) 2008 World Championships	2	38.71	3	64.81	1	105.28	2	208.80

Results in the 2008–09 season
Date	Event	CD		OD		FD		Total	
Date	Event	P	Score	P	Score	P	Score	P	Score
Jan 14–18, 2009	(Canada) 2009 Canadian Championships	1	39.33	1	63.76	1	94.68	1	197.77
Feb 2–8, 2009	(Canada) 2009 Four Continents Championships	1	36.40	1	60.90	2	94.51	2	191.81
Mar 24–28, 2009	(United States) 2009 World Championships	3	39.37	6	61.05	4	99.98	3	200.40
Apr 16–19, 2009	(Japan) 2009 World Team Trophy	–	–	2	60.98	2	95.73	2 (2)	156.71

Results in the 2009–10 season
Date	Event	CD		OD		FD		Total	
Date	Event	P	Score	P	Score	P	Score	P	Score
Oct 15–18, 2009	(France) 2009 Trophée Éric Bompard	1	38.41	1	61.91	1	97.39	1	197.71
Nov 19–22, 2009	2009 Skate Canada International	1	40.69	1	60.57	1	103.12	1	204.38
Dec 3–6, 2009	(Japan) 2009–10 Grand Prix Final	–	–	2	64.01	1	104.21	2	168.22
Jan 11–17, 2010	(Canada) 2010 Canadian Championships	1	43.98	1	70.15	1	107.82	1	221.95
Feb 14–27, 2010	(Canada) 2010 Winter Olympics	2	42.74	1	68.41	1	110.42	1	221.57
Mar 22–28, 2010	(Italy) 2010 World Championships	1	44.13	1	70.27	2	110.03	1	224.43

Olympic Games
Preceded by Rosie MacLennan	Flagbearer for Canada; 2018 Pyeongchang (with Scott Moir)	Succeeded by Miranda Ayim; Nathan Hirayama
