= Stanislaw Andrzejewski =

Stanislaw Andrzejewski may refer to:

- Stanisław Andrzejewski (1916–1997), Polish footballer
- Stanislav Andreski (1919–2007), birth name Stanisław Andrzejewski, Polish socioligist
