= Jadwiga Barańska =

Polish actress and screenwriter (1935–2024)

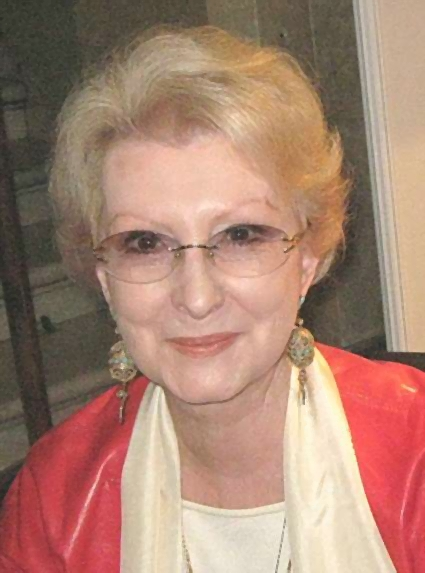
- Barańska in 2009
- Born: Jadwiga Barańska; 21 October 1935; Łódź, Poland
- Died: 24 October 2024 (aged 89); Los Angeles, California, U.S.
- Occupations: Actress, screenwriter
- Years active: 1958–2002
- Spouse: Jerzy Antczak
- Children: 1

Jadwiga Barańska (21 October 1935 – 24 October 2024) was a Polish actress and screenwriter. She was married to Polish director Jerzy Antczak. Together they had one child, Mikołaj Antczak, born in 1964. She began her career on the stages of the Classic Theatre in 1959–1966. She then performed at the Polish Theatre in Warsaw until 1972. She achieved success as a film actress, appearing mainly in the films of her husband. She gained her greatest fame starring as Barbara Niechcic in the adaptation of the novel Nights and Days by Maria Dąbrowska and the title role in Countess Cosel. She also performed in the Polish television theatre, Teatr Telewizji. She had lived in the US since 1979. Barańska died on 24 October 2024 in Los Angeles, at the age of 89.

== Selected filmography ==
- Wraki (1956) as Irena
- Powrót doktora Von Kniprode (1965)
- Hrabina Cosel (1968) as Anna Constantia Hoym countess Cosel, Anna Constantia of Brockdorff
- Epilog Norymberski (1970) as an Auschwitz victim
- Kłopotliwy gość (1971) as a secretary
- Noce i dnie, Nights and Days (1975) as Barbara Niechcic
- Trędowata (1976) as countess Idalia Elzonowska
- Gniazdo wdów (Nido de viudas, 1977) as Carmen
- Noce i dnie, in English Nights and Days, (TV serial) (1977) as Barbara Niechcic
- Dama kameliowa (1995) as a screenwriter
- Chopin, Pragnienie miłości, in English Chopin: Desire for Love (2002) as Justyna Chopin, Frédéric Chopin's mother

== Awards ==
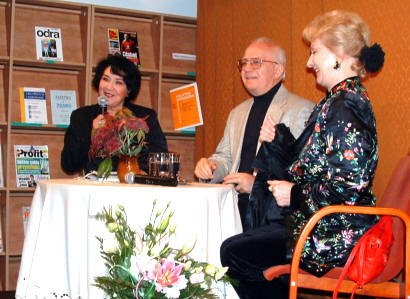
Jadwiga Barańska with Jerzy Antczak

She won the Silver Bear for Best Actress for her role in Nights and Days at the 26th Berlin International Film Festival in 1976.
