= Niespotykanie spokojny człowiek =

- Written by: Andrzej Mularczyk
- Directed by: Stanisław Bareja
- Starring: Janusz Kłosiński; Ryszarda Hanin; Marek Frąckowiak; Małgorzata Potocka; Jerzy Turek
- Music by: Waldemar Kazanecki
- Original language: Polish

Production
- Cinematography: Andrzej Ramlau
- Running time: 56 minutes

Original release
- Release: 24 December 1975

Niespotykanie spokojny człowiek (Pol. Incredibly peaceful man) is a Polish television film from 1975 directed by Stanisław Bareja.

== Cast ==
- Janusz Kłosiński - Stanislaw Wlodek
- Ryszarda Hanin - Aniela Wlodek
- Malgorzata Potocka - Helenka
- Janina Sokolowska - Ula
- Marek Frąckowiak - Tadek Wlodek
- Jerzy Turek - Truck Driver
- Stanisław Tym - Capt. Tadeusz Zwozniak
- Ludwik Benoit - Guard
