= Agnieszka Sitek =

Polish actress (born 1973)

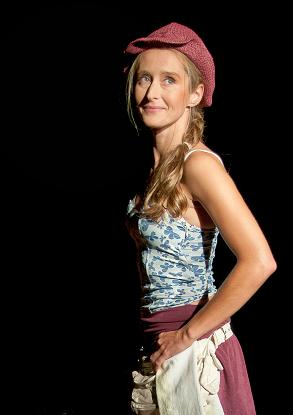
- Agnieszka Sitek, 2011
- Born: 8 July 1973 (age 53); Łódź, Poland
- Education: National Academy of Dramatic Art in Warsaw
- Occupation: Actress
- Years active: 1996–present

Agnieszka Sitek (born 8 July 1973, Łódź) is a Polish film, television and theatre actress.

== Life and career ==
She was born on 8 July 1973 in Łódź. She is a graduate of the Bolesław Prus High School No. 21 in Łódź. In 1996, she graduated from the National Academy of Dramatic Art in Warsaw. She worked at theatres in Bydgoszcz as well as the Comedy Theatre in Warsaw. Her most prominent role is featured in Vladimír Michálek's 1998 film Sekal Has to Die. In 1999, she received the Czech Lion Award for Best Supporting Actress conferred by the Czech Film and Television Academy (ČFTA) for her performance in the film. She was also nominated for the Polish Film Award. In 2002, she played in Jerzy Antczak's biographic film Chopin: Desire for Love in which she portrayed Frederic Chopin's mother Izabela. Between 2000–2008, she collaborated with the Ochota Theatre in Warsaw. She is also a co-founder of the teatr tm Association.

== Filmography ==
- 1997-2001: Złotopolscy as Weronika Gabriel
- 1997: Sztos as Barbara
- 1997: Sława i chwała as Helena Gołąbkówna (episodes 5-7)
- 1997: Pokój 107 as a girl at the disco
- 1997: Dom as Beata's friend (episodes 17-18)
- 1998: Sekal Has to Die as Agnieszka
- 1999: Wrota Europy as Ira
- 2002: The Hexer as witcher Adela (episode 2)
- 2002: Chopin: Desire for Love as Izabela Chopin, Frederic's sister
- 2013: Prawo Agaty as Iwona Rydlewska (episode 53)
- 2015: Na dobre i na złe as Janina (episode 592)

== See also ==
- Polish cinema
- Polish Film Awards
