= Henryk Borowski =

Polish actor (1910–1991)

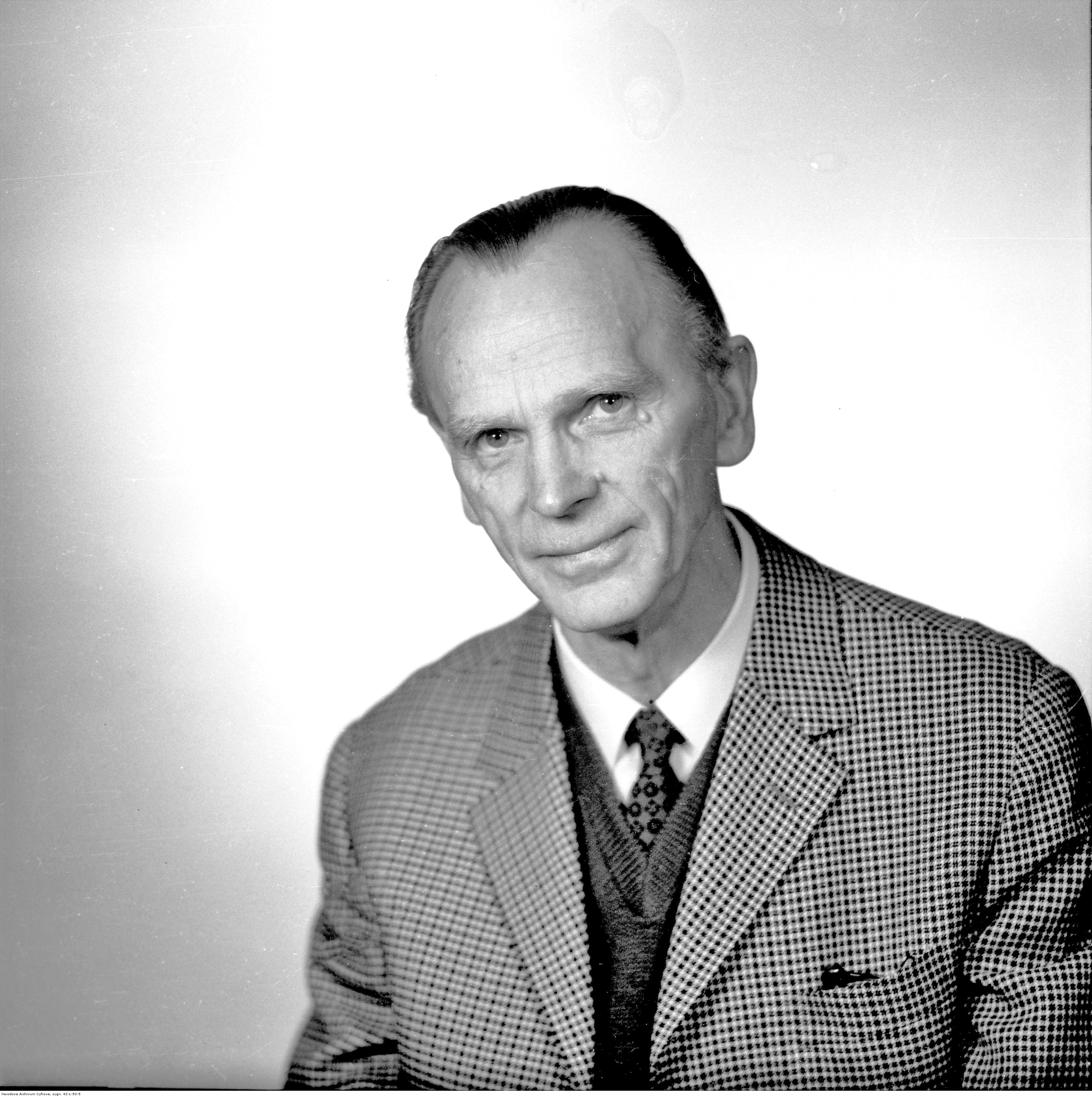
Portrait of Henryk Borowski

Henryk Borowski (14 February 1910 – 13 November 1991) was a Polish theater, radio and film actor. He was born in Płock and died in Warsaw.

== Filmography ==
Year	Title	Role	Notes
1947	Zakazane piosenki	Executioner	
1949	Za wami pójda inni...	Prof. Brzozowski	
1950	Robinson warszawski		
1954	Domek z kart	Editor Marian Korbicki	
1954	Autobus odjezdza 6.20	Slabonski	
1954	Trudna milosc	Bielecki	
1957	Pozegnanie z diablem	Maciej Rubach	
1958	Król Macius I	Minister of Internal Affairs	
1959	Kamienne niebo	professor	
1960	Krzyżacy	Zygfryd de Löwe	
1966	Klub profesora Tutki	Judge, Tutka's interlocutor	TV series
1968	Hrabina Cosel	minister Adolf Magnus Hoym	
1969	Ruchome piaski		
1971	Epilog norymberski	Joachim von Ribbentrop	
1973	Wesele	old man	
1973	Kopernik	Tiedemann Giese	
1973	Kaprysy Łazarza	Jacenty	TV movie
1975	Noce i dnie	Klemens	
1984	Az óriás	Csipesz bácsi	
1986	Jezioro Bodeńskie	Wildermayer	
1988	Küldetés Evianba		
1989	Alchemik	Father Salezy	
