= Kazimiera Utrata =

Polish actress (1932–2018)

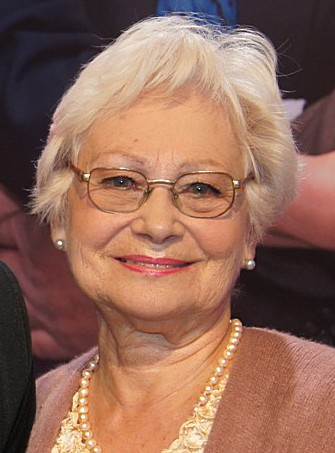
- Kazimiera Utrata in 2012
- Born: 5 July 1932; Warsaw, Poland
- Died: 12 August 2018 (aged 86)
- Occupation: Actress
- Years active: 1959–2018

Kazimiera Utrata (5 July 1932 – 12 August 2018) was a Polish actress. She appeared in 49 films and television shows from 1959 to 2018.

== Selected filmography ==
- A Woman's Decision (1975)
- Ballada o Januszku (1988)
