= Andrzej Kozak =

Polish actor (born 1934)

- Born: 14 September 1934; Kraków, Poland

Andrzej Kozak (born 14 September 1934) is a Polish actor. In 1974, he starred in the Academy Award-nominated film The Deluge directed by Jerzy Hoffman.

== Selected filmography ==
- Westerplatte (1967)
- The Deluge (1974)
- Przeklęte oko proroka (1984)
