= Waldemar Kazanecki =

Polish musician

- Born: Waldemar Kazanecki; 29 April 1929; Warsaw, Poland
- Died: 20 December 1991; Warsaw, Poland
- Occupations: Composer; Pianist; Conductor

Waldemar Kazanecki ([valˈdɛmar kazaˈnɛtski]; 29 April 1929 – 20 December 1991) was a Polish pianist, conductor and composer.

== Life and career ==
Waldemar Kazanecki was born and died in Warsaw. He began as a music editor on Polish Radio Katowice in 1954 and later became a pianist in the Jerzy Harald Orchestra. Kazanecki began composing for movies with the film Hrabina Cosel (The Countess Cosel) in 1966. In 1975 he produced the score for Nights and Days (Noce i Dnie), Jerzy Antczak's Academy Award-nominated film. In total, he composed for some 500 movies and television shows. Kazanecki died in Warsaw in 1991.

== Selected works ==
- Czarne chmury (1973)
- Nie ma róży bez ognia (1974)
- Noce i dnie (1975)
- Brunet wieczorową porą (1976)
- Dom (1980)
- Bolek i Lolek
- Baśnie i waśnie
- Zaczarowany ołówek
- Ballada o Januszku (1987)
- Do przerwy 0:1 (1969)
- Gorzka miłość (1990)
- Hrabina Cosel (1968)
- Tylko Kaśka (1980)
- Muchy króla Apsika
