= Ballada o Januszku =

Ballada o Januszku was a Polish mini series aired from 1988–1989. It was first broadcast on 8 November 1988. The series was based on the book written by Sławomir Łubiński.

== Cast ==
- Wiesław Adamowski
- Leonard Andrzejewski
- Mirosław Baka – Stasiek Wątroba
- Stanisław Banasiuk
- Marek Barbasiewicz – wychowawca Lucjan O.
- Wojciech Brzozowicz
- Barbara Brylska – teacher
- Janusz Bylczyński
- Magda Celówna
- Krzysztof Chamiec - adwokat Żurka
- Andrzej Chudy – milicjant Świerczyński
- Anna Ciepielewska - Halina Ściborek, Mariola's mother
- Wiesław Drzewicz - Stefan Ściborek, Mariola's father
- Bożena Dykiel – kierowniczka
- Lidia Fiedosiejewa-Szukszyna - Genowefa Smoliwąs
- Aleksandra Ford-Sampolska
- Marek Frąckowiak
- Aleksander Gawroński
- Marian Glinka - Drodż, nauczyciel WF
- Iwona Głębicka
- Maciej Góraj
- Jarosław Góral – Janusz Smoliwąs
- Andrzej Grąziewicz
- Jolanta Grusznic - Jadzia, koleżanka Gieni
- Wirgiliusz Gryń – Józef Kalisiak
- Zofia Jamry – współlokatorka Gieni w sanatorium
- Małgorzata Kaczmarska
- Maria Klejdysz
- Janusz Kłosiński - adwokat
- Halina Kossobudzka - sędzina
- Roman Kosierkiewicz
- Krzysztof Kotowski
- Ryszard Kotys - hycel
- Andrzej Krasicki
- Piotr Krasicki
- Roman Kruczkowski
- Małgorzata Kurmin - Ela Kwiatek, współpracownica Gieni
- Teresa Lipowska – neighbour Karolakowa
- Gustaw Lutkiewicz – neighbour Karolak
- Jolanta Łagodzińska - Mariola Ściborek, narzeczona Januszka
- Sławomira Łozińska – secretary
- Ignacy Machowski - teacher
- Bohdana Majda - sklepikarka Jeżewska
- Marzena Manteska
- Tadeusz Matejko
- Wiesława Mazurkiewicz – współlokatorka Gieni w sanatorium
- Celina Męcner
- Stanisław Michalski - school director
- Bożena Miefiodow
- Alicja Migulanka - współpracownica Gieni
- Zbigniew Modej
- Jerzy Molga - lekarz w sanatorium
- Jolanta Muszyńska
- Leon Niemczyk - doctor Edmund Żurek
- Janusz Rafał Nowicki - wychowawca w poprawczaku
- Janusz Paluszkiewicz - Karuzela
- Bronisław Pawlik – kuracjusz Sitkowski
- Maciej Perszewski - Arek Żurek
- Józef Pieracki – doctor
- Małgorzata Pritulak
- Sylwester Przedwojewski
- Witold Pyrkosz - dyrektor Tadeusz Stasiak
- Ewa Rudnicka
- Zdzisław Rychter
- Jacek Ryniewicz
- Włodzimierz Saar
- Janina Seredyńska
- Katarzyna Skolimowska
- Bogusław Sochnacki - milicjant Marian Owocny
- Lech Sołuba
- Tadeusz Somogi
- Tatiana Sosna-Sarno - pokojówka w sanatorium
- Ewa Szykulska - Żurkowa
- Michał Szymczyk
- Bożena Szymańska
- Jerzy Turek - mailman
- Paweł Unrug - taksówkarz
- Kazimiera Utrata-Lusztig - krawcowa
- Zdzisław Wardejn - Zdzisiu Mierzwiński, kochanek Gieni
- Hanna Wrycza-Polk - Kwiecińska
- Sylwia Wysocka
- Wojciech Zagórski - photographer
