= Marek Frąckowiak =

Polish actor

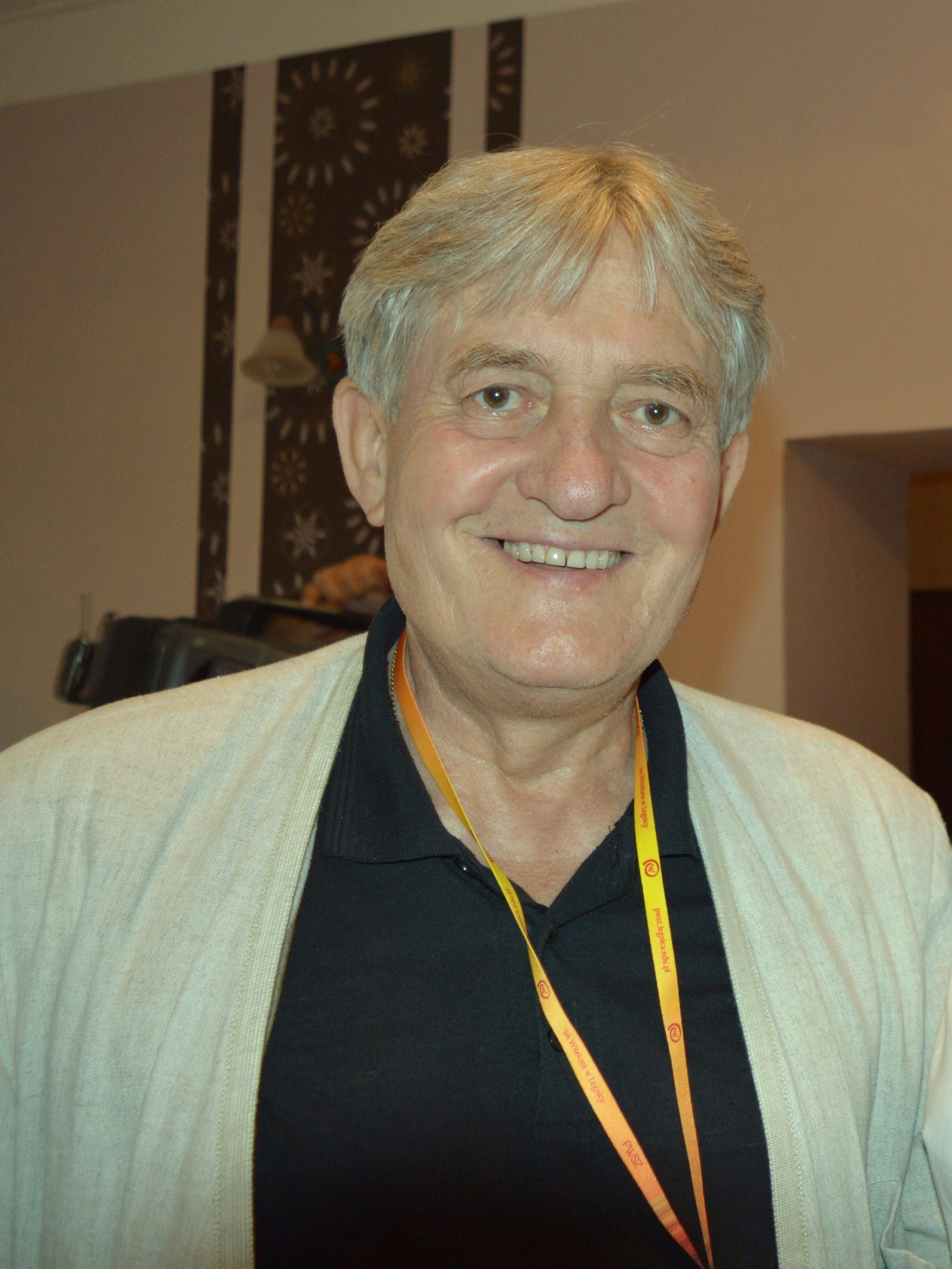
- Frąckowiak in August 2015
- Born: Marek Antoni Frąckowiak; 16 August 1950; Łódź, Poland
- Died: 6 November 2017 (aged 67); Łódź, Poland
- Occupation: Actor
- Years active: 1971–2017
- Spouse: Ewa Złotowska

Marek Antoni Frąckowiak (16 August 1950, Łódź – 6 November 2017, Łódź) was a Polish actor of stage and screen. He had roles in Niespotykanie spokojny człowiek, Ekipa, Ballada o Januszku, The Last Wish and Artyści. He also extensively dubbed film, television and video games.

== Illness and death ==
Frąckowiak died of spinal cancer on 6 November 2017, at the age of 67.
