= Chopin: Desire for Love =

2002 Polish biographical film

- Directed by: Jerzy Antczak
- Produced by: Jerzy Antczak
- Starring: Piotr Adamczyk
- Music by: Frédéric Chopin
- Release date: 2002
- Running time: 134 minutes
- Country: Poland
- Language: Polish

Chopin: Desire for Love (Polish: Chopin. Pragnienie miłości) is a film created by the director Jerzy Antczak based on the life story of the Polish pianist and composer Frédéric Chopin.

The plot covers the affair between Chopin and feminist writer George Sand. Chopin's music is integral to the film, with pianist Janusz Olejniczak playing his works. Two versions of the film were shot—in Polish and English—with British actors later lip-syncing the dialogue. Antczak spent 25 years writing the screenplay and six years raising the budget for the film.

The film was screened at Houston Film Festival in 2003 and won the Gold Award for Best Cinematography and the Platinum Award for Best Drama.

== Plot ==
The film starts when Frédéric Chopin is still a young man living with his parents and his two sisters in Warsaw where he frequently plays the piano and composes music for the decidedly unmusical Grand Duke Constantine. Shortly before the November Uprising, Chopin's father urges him to leave for Paris, which Frédéric does. Once in Paris he meets novelist George Sand, who has just split from her violent lover Mallefille. Although he is immediately drawn to Sand, he initially refuses her advances. However, after several months, their mutual friend Albert urges Chopin to get to know George better and a passionate romance starts to build. During their affair, Chopin is diagnosed with tuberculosis and has to cope with declining health. The relationship is further complicated by George's two children: Maurice and Solange. While Maurice's near-hysterical hatred of Chopin leads from one escalation to the other, Solange develops an obsessive love for Chopin which leads to a rivalry between Solange and her mother. After several years of constant fighting between Chopin, George, Maurice and Solange, the relationship ends and Chopin calls for one of his sisters to help him get through the last days of his life.

== Cast ==
- Piotr Adamczyk as Frédéric Chopin: famous Polish composer and pianist.
- Danuta Stenka as George Sand: French author whose given name was Amandine Lucille Aurore Dudevant-Dupin.
- Adam Woronowicz as Maurice Dudevant: Sand's son.
- Bozena Stachura and Sara Müldner as Solange Dudevant: Sand's daughter. Müldner plays the young version of Solange
- Andrzej Zieliński as Albert Grzymala: Chopin's closest friend
- Michal Konarski as Franz Liszt: famous Hungarian composer and pianist.
- Jadwiga Barańska as Justyna Chopin: Chopin's mother
- Jerzy Zelnik as Nicolas Chopin: Chopin's father
- Agnieszka Sitek as Izabela Chopin: Chopin's sister
- Anna Radwan as Ludwika Chopin: Chopin's sister
- Anna Korcz as Baroness Charlotte de Rothschild: French socialite and art patron.
- Janusz Gajos as Grand Duke Constantine Pavlovich Romanov: Polish Grand Duke of Russian ancestry who frequently called upon Chopin.
- Maria Gładkowska as Grand Duchess Joanna: Grand Duke Constantine's wife.
- Jacek Rozenek as Jean Pierre Félicien Mallefille: George Sand's first lover
- Marian Opania as Jan: Chopin's servant
