= Janusz Kłosiński =

Polish actor (1920–2017)

Janusz Kłosiński (19 November 1920 – 8 November 2017) was a Polish film and theatre actor.

== Biography ==
In 1948 he graduated from The Aleksander Zelwerowicz National Academy of Dramatic Art in Warsaw, which was located in his hometown of Łódź at the time.

Beginning in 1947, Kłosiński performed in theaters in Łódź, and, from 1964 to 1970, was the director of the New Theatre in Łódź. Beginning 1970 in Warsaw, among others, he was a member of the National Theatre in Warsaw.

He was also a member of the PZPR, including also being a Secretary of the Communist Party Committee of the Company at the National Theatre. Shortly after the introduction of martial law in Poland, Kłosiński openly supported the decision of the authorities at the time, even on public television. Public support for the introduction of martial law covered by the boycott by the audience. He retired from much of his acting after announcing it in a showing of the Wedding in 1982.

From 5 November 1961 onwards, he had continuously portrayed Józef Jabłoński in the novel radio W Jezioranach, broadcast on Program 1 in Polskie Radio.

Kłosiński died on 8 November 2017, just 11 days short of his 97th birthday. His final spot of burial was never revealed.

== Notable roles ==
Year	Title	Role	Notes
1961	Ogniomistrz Kaleń	Antoni Żubryd	
1962	The Two Who Stole the Moon	Mortadella	
1964	The Saragossa Manuscript	Don Diego Salero	
1965	Katastrofa	Nowak	
1970	Znaki na drodze	Mechanic Franciszek Wasko	
1975–1978	Czterdziestolatek	Wincenty Wardowski	
1975	Niespotykanie spokojny człowiek	Stanisław Włodek	
1984	Przeklęte oko proroka		
1988–1989	Ballada o Januszku	Advocate	
2007	All Will Be Well	Priest	
