= Epilog norymberski =

1971 film by Jerzy Antczak

Epilog norymberski is a Polish historical film. It was released in 1971.

== Cast ==
- Henryk Borowski as Joachim von Ribbentrop
- August Kowalczyk as Alfred Jodl
- Wiktor Nanowski
- Leonard Andrzejewski
- Jerzy Moes
- Michał Pluciński as Nelte
- Janusz Bylczyński as Accused
- Krzysztof Fus
- Tadeusz Cygler as General Walther von Brauchistsch
- Janusz Cywiński as Defender
- Teodor Genera as Defender
