= Przeklęte oko proroka =

1984 Polish historical film

Przeklęte oko proroka is a Polish historical film. It was released in 1984.

== Cast ==
- Lubomir Cvetkov as Hanusz Bystry
- Franciszek Trzeciak as Kajdasz
- Djoko Rosić as Kara Mordach
- Zbigniew Borek as kozak Semen Bedryszko
- Andrzej Kozak as father Benignus
- Aleksandar Gochev as Dragan/Janissary, Dragan's brother
- Nikolay Chadzhiminentev as Mongol
- Bogdan Baer as sergeant
- Andrzej Balcerzak as Heliasz
- Adam Probosz as Urbanek, Heliasz's son
- Henryk Bista
- Edward Linde-Lubaszenko as Marek Bystry, Hanusz's father
- Gustaw Lutkiewicz as kozak Opanas Bedryszko
- Wiesław Gołas as kozak Midopak, Semen's partner
- Adam Romanowski as young peasant
- Janusz Kłosiński as Kalicki
- Krzysztof Litwin as merchant Grygier
- Dobri Dobrev
- Stefan Cvetkov
- Tadeusz Kwinta
