= Countess Cosel =

Hrabina Cosel (Countess Cosel)
- Promotional movie poster
- Directed by: Jerzy Antczak
- Written by: Józef Ignacy Kraszewski; Zdzislaw Skowronski
- Starring: Jadwiga Barańska; Mariusz Dmochowski; Daniel Olbrychski
- Cinematography: Boguslaw Lambach; Jan Janczewski
- Edited by: Janina Niedźwiecka
- Music by: Waldemar Kazanecki
- Distributed by: Zespol Filmowy Iluzjon
- Release date: 6 September 1968 (Poland)
- Running time: 139 minutes
- Country: Poland
- Language: Polish

Countess Cosel (Polish: Hrabina Cosel) is a 1968 Polish film directed by Jerzy Antczak. The film is based on Józef Ignacy Kraszewski’s novel Hrabina Cosel, a historical romance set in the court of Augustus the Strong, the first of the two Saxon kings of Poland, at the turn of the 18th century.

== Plot ==
The Countess Cosel is based on the true story of the beautiful Anna Constantia von Brockdorff, a German noblewoman who became mistress of Augustus the Strong, King of Poland and Elector of Saxony in 1704.

Against the backdrop of life at Augustus’ court the movie follows the arrival at Dresden of 24-year-old Anna Constantia von Brockdorff, who is an inordinately beautiful and scrupulously devout young married woman; her romance with the king and her ‘ten year reign’ as his mistress – a role she consents to in the belief that she has won the king's love and commitment; and finally, her heartbreak, disillusionment and struggle against him. The conflict between Anna and the king arises from the fact that Anna takes seriously not only the relationship, but the written promise of marriage which she manages to secure from him during their courtship. Neither the relationship nor the contract is held in much esteem by Augustus, who replaces her, as he has always done, with another mistress, as soon as she loses for him the charm of novelty. Her valiant refusal to return the marriage promissory note upon request enrages him and delivers her to her miserable fate.

In the opinion of the court, Cosel came to be considered increasingly dangerous when it became known that King Augustus had given her a secret written promise of marriage. Ultimately, she fell from grace with the king when she showed her jealousy after her spies told her about the king's affair with Countess Maria Magdalena von Dönhoff of Warsaw. Distraught and feeling desperate to win back the king's affection, Cosel departed Dresden to meet the king in Warsaw only to be turned back at the city gates. Augustus, having no more feelings for his former mistress, gave orders to lock her up in the Stolpen fortress. Cosel's faith and courage, which replaced her initial despair and anger culminated in her decision to remain in her jail, even after Augustus’ death, thirty-two years before her own, opened the way for her to regain her freedom. As a result, Cosel was imprisoned for forty-nine years, before she died in 1765, being eighty-five years of age. To the end of her life she preserved traces of her great beauty, by which she became so famous.

== Cast ==
- Jadwiga Barańska – Anna Constantia von Brockdorff, countess Cosel
- Mariusz Dmochowski – Augustus II the Strong
- Stanisław Jasiukiewicz – Raimund Zaklika, Polish soldier in love with Cosel and her faithful servant
- Daniel Olbrychski – King Charles XII of Sweden
- Ignacy Gogolewski – baron Frederic Kyan
- Stanisław Milski – count Egon von Fürstenberg
- Henryk Borowski – count Adolf von Hoym, Cosel's husband
- Władysław Hańcza – Saxon general Schulenburg
- Leon Niemczyk – French count de Lecherenne
- Krystyna Chmielewska – Marianna Dönhoff, new mistress of the king Augustus
- Mieczysław Kałenik – La Haye, lieutenant of the life guards
- Maria Homerska – Christiane Eberhardine, king's wife
- Władysław Dewoyno – Holder, a Saxon nobleman
- Bronisław Pawlik – Johann Böttger, king's alchemist
