= Nights and Days =

1975 drama film

- Directed by: Jerzy Antczak
- Written by: Jerzy Antczak; Maria Dąbrowska
- Starring: Jadwiga Barańska; Jerzy Bińczycki; Beata Tyszkiewicz; Andrzej Seweryn; Jerzy Kamas; Elżbieta Starostecka
- Cinematography: Stanisław Loth
- Music by: Waldemar Kazanecki
- Distributed by: Studio Filmowe Kadr
- Release date: 23 September 1975
- Running time: 632 minutes (TV version)
- Country: Poland
- Language: Polish

Nights and Days (Polish: Noce i dnie) is a 1975 Polish film directed by Jerzy Antczak. This epic family drama was based on Maria Dąbrowska's novel Noce i dnie, and was described by The Washington Post as "Poland's Gone With the Wind". Set in Kalisz and the Kalisz Region in the second half of the 19th century after the failure of the January Uprising in 1863, the film presents a unique portrait of an oppressed society, life in exile, and the confiscation of private property as told through the loves and struggles of the Niechcic family. This sweeping historical epic was the highest-grossing film in Poland's history upon its release and was nominated for an Academy Award for Best Foreign Language Film in 1977. The film score was composed by Waldemar Kazanecki, which includes a Viennese waltz that is frequently played at Polish weddings as the first dance of bride and groom.

Amid the turbulence of World War I, elderly Barbara Niechcic recalls her dramatic life with husband Bogumił over a half-century of Polish history, starting with the failed January Uprising in 1863. Barbara, running away from burning city of Kalisz is reminiscing her unfulfilled love, her marriage to a man she initially did not love, death of her first child, birth of three others, confiscation of her family property, her separation from her husband, his illness, death and other numerous family struggles.

== Plot ==
Nights and Days is a family saga of Barbara Ostrzeńska-Niechcic, and Bogumił Niechcic, against the backdrop of the January Uprising of 1863 and World War I. The film is a partial adaptation of a novel by Maria Dąbrowska with the same title. The plot is woven around the changing fortunes of a noble (upper-class, although deprived of property as post-uprising repression) Niechcic family in the pre-WWI Poland. There are two main crossing threads: a social history one and an existential one. The cinematographic version is a condensation of the 12-part award winning TV serial of the same title and using the same cast and producers.

=== Part One: Bogumił and Barbara ===
Barbara Ostrzeńska marries former landowner Bogumił Niechcic out of respect for his heroic past contributions to the 1863 January Uprising rather than love for him as she is secretly in love with the handsome Mr. Toliboski. Their task of forging a new life together begins at a small estate, Krempa, of which Bogumił is the administrator.

=== Part Two: Peter and Teresa ===
Barbara suffers the loss of her first child, a four-year-old boy named Peter and decides to leave her home at Krempa to start a new life at the run-down land property of Serbinow. Barbara's beloved sister Teresa dies.

=== Part Three: Grandma ===
Bogumił is successful as the manager of the estate at Serbinow. Financial security, the birth of their three children (named: Agnieszka, Emilia and Tomasz) signal better times at last. Barbara's sick mother moves in with them only to die.

=== Part Four: Eternal Worries ===
Bogumił's dedication to his work is praised by the landowner of 'Serbinow', but Barbara has trouble with Tommy (Tomaszek, their youngest child), who is lying and stealing. They employ a governess for their three children. Barbara and Bogumił become more distant with each other as Barbara dreams of moving to the nearby city of Kaliniec.

=== Part Five: Good Luck ===
Barbara's uncle dies, bequeathing her 6,000 rubles. Bogumił advises her to invest in Serbinow, but her preference is a building property in Kaliniec. Meanwhile, Danielecki, owner of Serbinow, arrives and anxious not to lose Bogumił improves his contract.

=== Part Six: Love ===
Mrs Hlasko, an experienced teacher arrives, so Barbara has no need to move to the town of Kaliniec with her children. There is an outbreak of typhoid and the family do what they can to help the sick farmhands of Serbinow. Eventually Barbara moves to Kaliniec with her children. Bogumił stays home alone at Serbinow and finds himself a young lover.

=== Part Seven: Wind in the Eyes ===
Fifteen years have passed since Bogumił and Barbara settled in Serbinow. During a celebration party, two gold coins go missing and their son Tommy is suspected. Meanwhile the 1905 Russian Revolution encourages farmhands to riot. When Barbara unexpectedly leaves her home in Kaliniec to visit Serbinow she finds Bogumił in the arms of another woman. Barbara is devastated.

=== Part Eight: Time for Love/Time for Death ===
Barbara and Bogumił are reconciled. The socialist-patriotic revolutionary movement expands, involving Barbara's daughter, Agnieszka, who returns from the university full of life and eager to love. In the meantime, their old governess, Ms. Celina, commits suicide when her lover abandons her.

=== Part Nine: Fathers and Children ===
Bogumił realizes that he is losing his daughter, Agnieszka, who decides to live with her belowed husband (also a socialist and a patriotic raveolutionist) in Brussels rather than staying at Serbinow with her family. Tommy continues to lie and steal, causing his parents much pain and suffering.

=== Part Ten: We are born, we die and life goes on ===
Despite worries about the children, Barbara and Bogumił feel secure and content. Bogumił orders drainage equipment for Serbinow without the owners' permission, using Barbara's money as a deposit. Soon news arrives from Paris that Serbinow has been sold. Bogumił and Barbara must move out and leave their home at Serbinow.

=== Part Eleven: At the end of the day ===
After more than twenty years at Serbinow, Bogumił and Barbara buy a small estate at Pamietow. Bogumił feels lost and tired. He becomes sick and dies asking his children to be honest and kind. Without Bogumił Barbara feels as if her world is completely destroyed. Meanwhile, Poland's struggle for independence continues.

=== Part Twelve: And then comes the night ===
Barbara moves permanently to Kalinec. As World War I breaks out and the Germans invade, Barbara hopes her children will come to her. When the Prussian army captures Kalinec, the people are glad to be free of the Russians. Germans burn down Kaliniec. Barbara leaves the burning city with a column of refugees in search of her children.

== Cast ==
- Jadwiga Barańska (Barbara Niechcic)
- Jerzy Bińczycki (Bogumił Niechcic)
- Barbara Ludwiżanka (Barbara's mother)
- Jerzy Kamas (Daniel Ostrzeński)
- Janina Traczykówna (Michalina Ostrzeńska)
- Elżbieta Starostecka (Teresa Ostrzeńska-Kociełło)
- Emir Buczacki (Lucjan Kociełło)
- Stanisława Celińska (Agnieszka Niechcic)
- Jan Englert (Marcin Śniadowski)
- Kazimierz Mazur (Tomasz Niechcic)
- Olgierd Łukaszewicz (Janusz Ostrzeński)
- Anna Nehrebecka (Celina Katelba)
- Andrzej Seweryn (Anzelm Ostrzeński)
- Karol Strasburger (Józef Toliboski)
- Henryk Borowski (Klemens Klicki)
- Beata Tyszkiewicz (Stefania Holszańska)
- Kazimierz Kaczor (Russian officer)
- Andrzej Szczepkowski (rejent Holszański)
- Władysław Hańcza (Jan Łada)
- Mieczysław Milecki (priest Komodziński)
- Marek Walczewski (Daleniecki)
- Barbara Rachwalska (servant girl to the Niechcic Family)
- Bożena Dykiel (Andzia Torebkówna)
- Andrzej Gawroński (Czerniak, peasant in Serbinow)
- Ryszarda Hanin (Żarnecka-main cook to the Niechcic Family)
- Ewa Dałkowska (Olesia Chrobotówna)
- Zofia Merle (peasant Maria Kałużna)
- Tadeusz Fijewski (Łuczak-peasant from Serbinow)
- Helena Kowalczykowa (peasant from Serbinow)
- Teodor Gendera (peasant from Serbinow)

== Awards ==
The film was nominated for the Academy Award for Best Foreign Language Film.

At the 26th Berlin International Film Festival in 1976, Jadwiga Barańska won the Silver Bear for Best Actress.

== See also ==
- List of submissions to the 49th Academy Awards for Best Foreign Language Film
- List of Polish submissions for the Academy Award for Best Foreign Language Film
