= Wojciech Zagórski =

Polish actor

Wojciech Cacko-Zagórski (6 August 1928 – 29 April 2016) was a Polish film and theatre actor.

Zagórski was a graduate of The Aleksander Zelwerowicz National Academy of Dramatic Art in Warsaw. He has been an actor in various Warsaw theaters: Classic Theatre in Warsaw (1950–1971), the TR Warszawa (1989–1993), and the Janusz Wisniewski Theatre (1988–1994). Originally, he performed in the Theatre front Artillery II, Army, then in the Theatre Children of Warsaw. He was also a theatre actor. He also has performed in theatres in Olsztyn and Opole. Zagórski usually had a wide audience familiar with his many supporting roles in feature films.
