= Anna Constantia von Brockdorff =

German noblewoman (1680–1765)

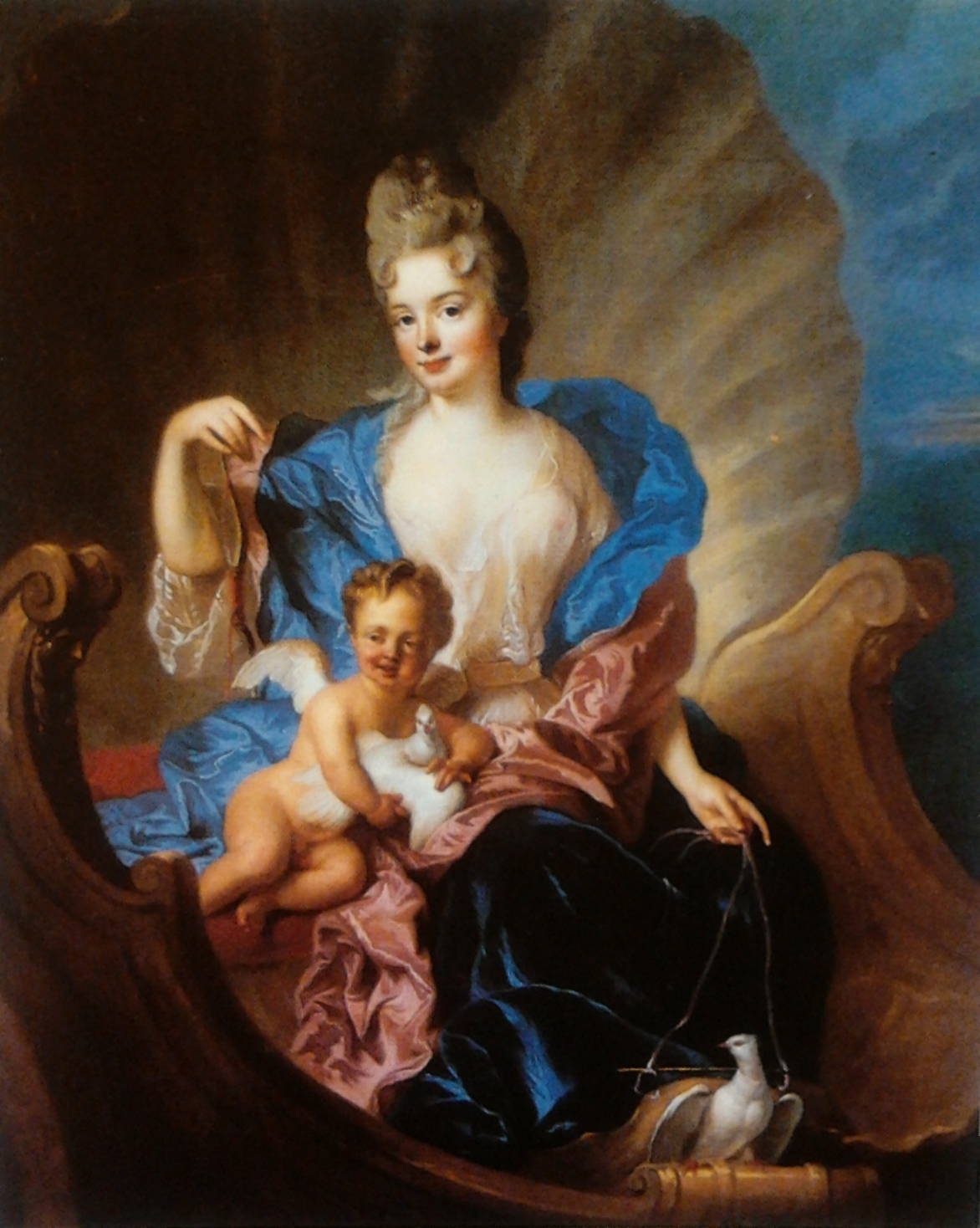
Portrait by François de Troy, 1712

Anna Constantia von Brockdorff (17 October 1680 – 31 March 1765), later the Countess of Cosel, was a German noblewoman, lady-in-waiting and mistress of Augustus the Strong, King of Poland and Elector of Saxony, in 1706–1713. Eventually he turned against her and exiled her to Saxony, where she died after 49 years of internal exile.

== Life ==
Anna Constantia was born in Gut Depenau, today part of Stolpe, Holstein, the daughter of the Knight (Ritter) Joachim von Brockdorff (1643–1719) and his wife, Anna Margarethe Marselis (1648-1736), grand-daughter of the rich Hamburg citizen Gabriel Marselis, owner of Gut Depenauborn. The Brockdorffs belonged to the Equites Originarii (ancient knightly noble families) and gave their daughter an unusual education for that time: she learned several languages, received instruction in mathematics and classical education, including music (lute in particular) and passionately loved to hunt. However, her impetuous behavior worried her parents.

=== Early adult life ===
In 1694, her parents sent Anna Constantia to the Schloss Gottorf in Schleswig, the official residence of the Duke Christian Albrecht. The fourteen-year-old girl served the Duke's daughter, Sophie Amalie, as a lady-in-waiting. Anna Constantia accompanied Sophie Amalie to Wolfenbüttel, where Sophie Amalie became the second wife of the Hereditary Prince August Wilhelm of Brunswick-Lüneburg, son and heir of the Duke Anton Ulrich. While in Wolfenbüttel, Anna Constantia became pregnant, possibly by Ludwig Rudolf, younger brother of the Hereditary Prince. After the birth of her child in 1702, Anna Constantia was expelled from the court and sent back to her parents in Gut Depenau. The fate of the child is unknown.

== Marriage ==
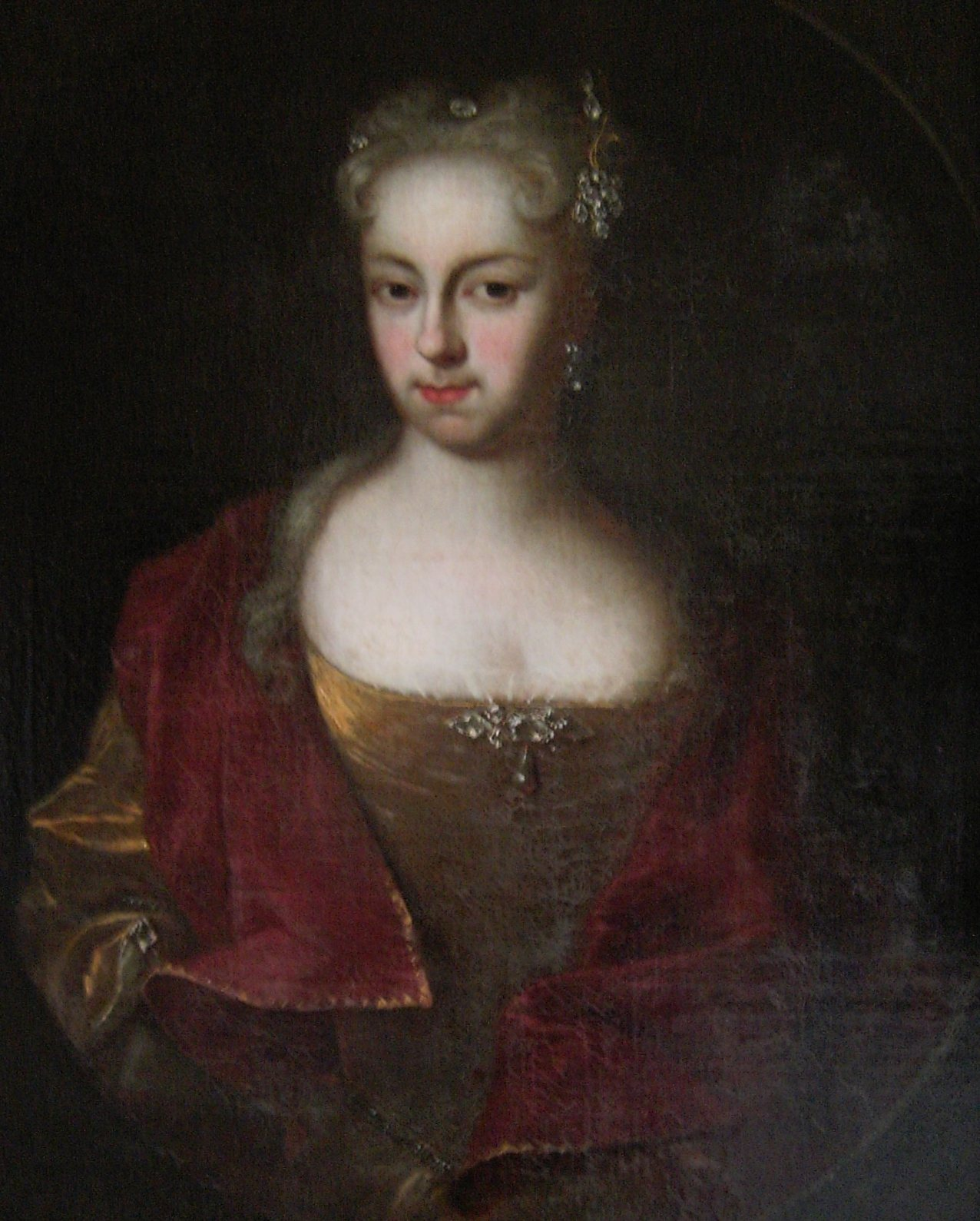
Anna Constantia during her marriage to the Baron Hoym

By 1699, Anna Constantia was living openly in Castle Burgscheidungen with the director of the Saxonian Generalakzis Kollegiums, Adolph Magnus, Baron of Hoym (1668-1723), whom she met in Wolfenbüttel. After four years of cohabitation, they were married on 2 July 1703 but were divorced by 1706. When she arrived in Dresden, Anna Constantia claimed that she was still married to the Baron in order to be able to appear at court. Her former husband was raised to the rank of Imperial Count on 17 July 1711.

=== Royal mistress ===
In 1704, the King of Poland and Elector of Saxony Augustus the Strong met the vivacious Baroness von Hoym and fell in love with her. The Baron of Hoym tried unsuccessfully to prevent the relationship, because he considered his former wife unsuitable for the role of official mistress. Augustus's pious wife, Christiane Eberhardine of Brandenburg-Bayreuth, refused to reign alongside her husband at the Catholic, scandalous Polish court, and had effectively exiled herself to Schloss Pretzsch (Elbe). Anna Constantia became close to Augustus, but he still had another mistress, Ursula Katharina, Princess of Teschen.

Finally, in 1705, the Princess of Teschen was banished from the court, and Anna Constantia took her place as official mistress. In 1706, she was created the Imperial Countess (Reichsgräfin) of Cosel. Two years later, on 24 February 1708, she gave birth to Augustus's daughter, named Augusta Anna Constantia after both her parents. On 27 October 1709, the Countess von Cosel bore a second daughter, Friederike Alexandrine, and three years later, on 27 August 1712, she had a son, Frederick Augustus, who was named after his father and eventually inherited Gut Depenau from his maternal grandparents.

In the opinion of the court, Anna Constantia interfered too much in politics, and her attempts to meddle in Polish politics in particular encountered strong resistance. The Protestant Electorate of Saxony was determined to turn the King's attention away from Catholic Poland, which he had lost after defeat at the hands of Sweden's Charles XII in the Great Northern War. Anna Constantia came to be considered increasingly dangerous to Polish political interests, especially when it was rumoured that Augustus had written his mistress in secret promising to marry her. The Polish aristocracy tried to supplant the Countess von Cosel with a Catholic mistress and thus eliminate her from the political scene. In time, Augustus finally gave in to the charms of the Catholic Maria Magdalena, Countess von Dönhoff.

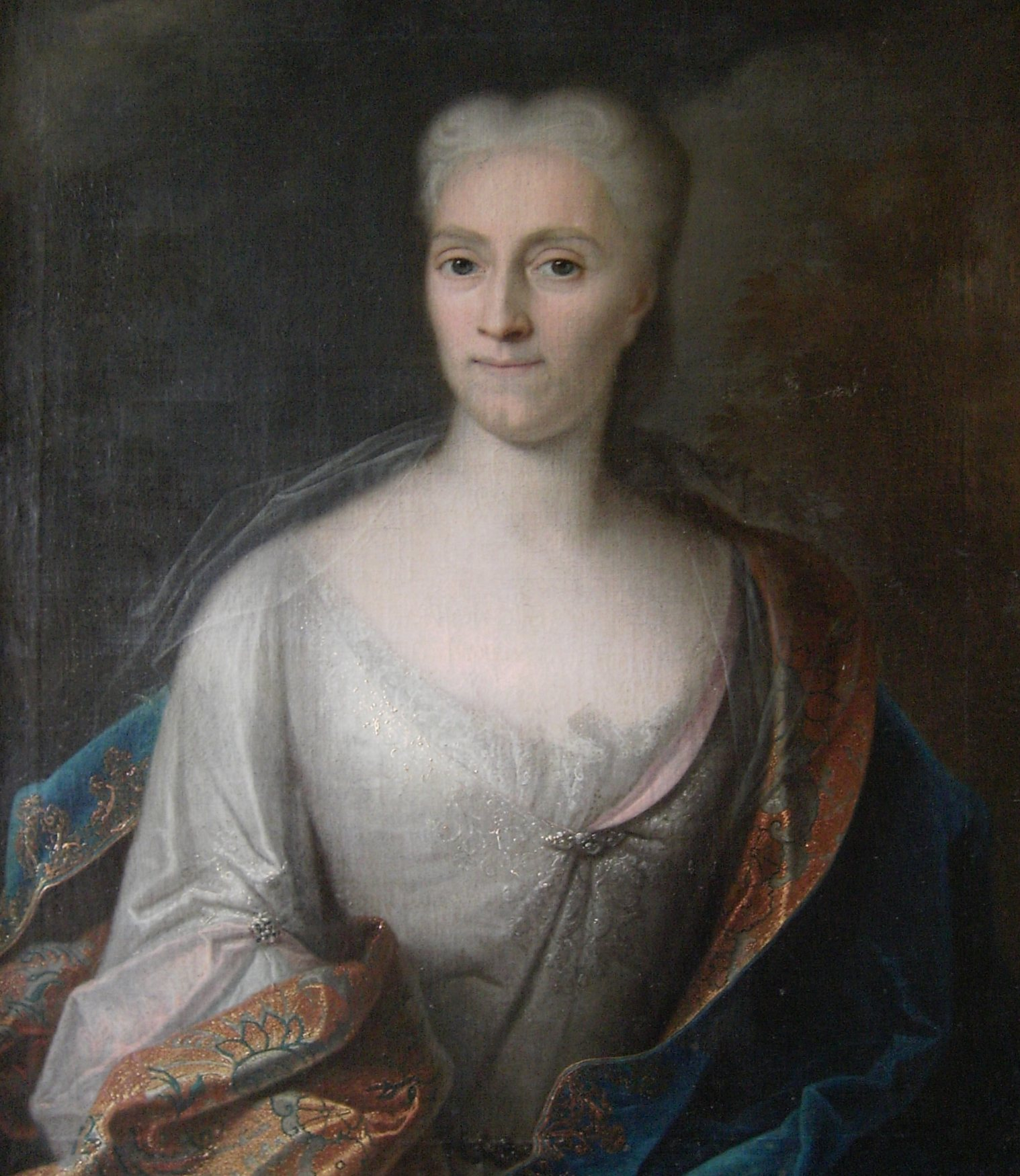
Anna Constantia during her exile at Burg Stolpen

=== Exiled to Burg Stolpen ===
In 1713, Anna Constantia was banished to the Pillnitz Castle, but in 1715 she managed to flee to Berlin, Prussia. For this, she was condemned in Saxony as a Landesverräter (state criminal). In Berlin, she hoped to get her hands on Augustus's secret written marriage promise, which was in the hands of her cousin, Count Detlev Christian zu Rantzau, held in the fortress of Spandau. However, the Countess failed to retrieve this important document and was arrested on 22 November 1716 in Halle an der Saale and exchanged for Prussian deserters in Saxony. Augustus exiled his former mistress on 26 December 1716 to Burg Stolpen, where she remained for the next 49 years until her death.

=== Emancipated after August II's demise? ===
There is some debate as to whether or not the Countess' exile was lifted after the death of Augustus II (1 February 1733) and during the reign of his son and successor, August III. Rumour has it she was not given freedom. Other rumours state, that the Countess did not use the opportunity to flee even though this was presented to her twice (1745 and 1756). In both cases the Saxon guards, according to rumour, fled before advancing Prussian troops.

A documented view on her circumstances after August II comes from the Polish writer Józef Ignacy Kraszewski's historical novel Countess of Cosel ("Hrabina Cosel" 1873, later the feature movie Hrabina Cosel). The following quote is from the final chapter where the Countess has been offered freedom after 17 years of imprisonment:

"What do I need freedom for now? The people have become strangers to me, and I am a stranger to them. Where can I go? I have nothing; they have robbed me of everything. You want to make me ridiculous; you wish that those who bowed down to me should now point the finger of scorn at me?...I do not want freedom; leave me here. I am accustomed to these walls, where I have shed all my tears; I could not live in another place."

The Countess died on 31 March 1765, aged 84 at Stolpen and is also buried there.
