= Jerzy Antczak =

Polish film director

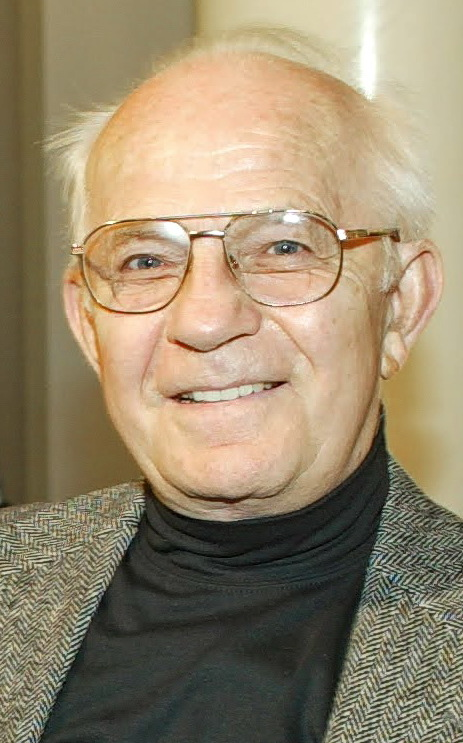
- Jerzy Antczak
- Born: 25 December 1929 (age 96); Włodzimierz Wołyński, Poland
- Occupation: Film director
- Spouse: Jadwiga Barańska

Jerzy Antczak (born 25 December 1929, in Włodzimierz Wołyński) is a Polish film director.

== Career ==
His film Nights and Days was nominated for an Academy Award for Best Foreign Language Film and was entered into the 26th Berlin International Film Festival. Jerzy Antczak was the co-founder, Artistic Director and Chief Producer of “Masterpiece Theatre” which was produced on Polish Television. He is currently a Professor Emeritus at UCLA.

In 2009 Jerzy Antczak received a star on the prestigious Alley of the Stars in Łódź.

== Selected filmography ==
- 1968: Hrabina Cosel
- 1970: Epilog norymberski
- 1975: Nights and Days
- 2002: Chopin: Desire for Love
