= Stanisław Andrzejewski =

Polish footballer

Personal information
- Full name: Stanisław Jan Andrzejewski
- Date of birth: 27 December 1916
- Place of birth: Zgierz, Congress Poland, Russian Empire
- Date of death: 10 January 1997 (aged 80)
- Place of death: Łódź, Poland
- Height: 1.72 m (5 ft 8 in)
- Position: Goalkeeper

Senior career*
Years	Team	Apps	(Gls)
–1935	IKP Łódź		
1936–1939	ŁKS Łódź		
1945–1946	WKS Łódź		

International career
1936	Poland	1	(0)
- * Club domestic league appearances and goals

Stanisław Jan Andrzejewski (27 December 1916 – 10 January 1997) was a Polish footballer who played as a goalkeeper.

He earned one cap for the Poland national team in 1936.
