= Stanislav Andreski =

Polish-British sociologist (1919–2007)

Stanisław Andrzejewski (or Stanislav Andreski) (8 May 1919, Częstochowa – 26 September 2007, Reading, Berkshire) was a Polish-British sociologist. He is known for his indictment of the "pretentious nebulous verbosity" endemic in the modern social sciences in his classic work Social Sciences as Sorcery (1972).

Andrzejewski was a Polish Army officer. During the German-Soviet invasion of Poland in 1939 he was taken prisoner by the Soviets. He escaped to Britain and fought against the Germans on the Western Front in Władysław Anders' Polish II Corps.

At the University of Reading, United Kingdom, he was a professor of sociology, a department he founded in 1965.

== Works ==
His books include:

- Military Organization and Society (London, Routledge & Paul, 1954, 2nd edition 1968)
- Elements of Comparative Sociology (London: Weidenfeld and Nicolson, 1964). Published in the United States as The Uses of Comparative Sociology (Berkeley, University of California Press, 1965) Theoretical perspectives grounded in concrete examples.
- The African Predicament: A Study in the Pathology of Modernization (London: M. Joseph, 1968). Tough-minded social criticism informed by the wider context of Andreski's sociological knowledge. E.g. Andreski notes the conditions of an escalating feedback spiral of distrust which—a few years after the publication of this book—led to Idi Amin's expulsion of the East Asian ethnic community from Uganda.
- Parasitism and Subversion: the Case of Latin America (London: Weidenfeld and Nicolson, 1966)
- Social Sciences as Sorcery (London: Andre Deutsch, 1972)
- Prospects of a Revolution in the U.S.A., (1973)
- Syphilis, Puritanism and Witch-hunts (1989, Macmillan Press, Ltd., London). Includes an appendix on the lessons one might apply from this history to the AIDS epidemic.
- Wars, Revolutions, Dictatorships (1992, London). A collection of articles written in the 1970s and 1980.

== See also ==
- Edward T. Hall
- Marvin Harris
