= Leonard Andrzejewski =

Polish actor

Leonard Henryk Andrzejewski (1 March 1924 – 18 October 1997) was a Polish actor. He appeared in the television series Ballada o Januszku in 1988-89. He was a winner of the Medal of the 10th Anniversary of People's Poland in 1955 and the Meritorious Activist of Culture in 1977.
