= Dzierżysławice =

Dzierżysławice Dirschelwitz
- Village
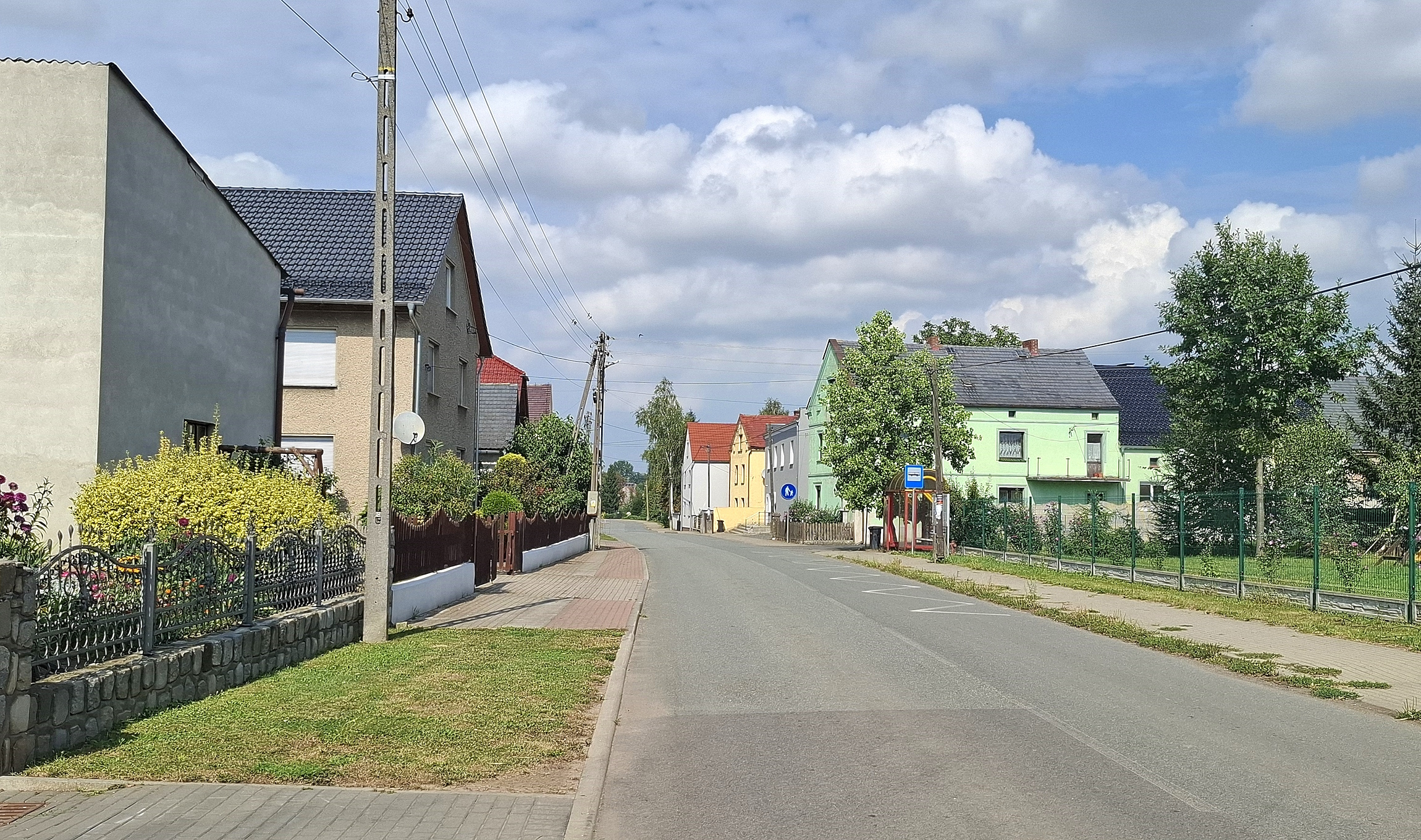
- Bus stop area

- Location within Poland
- Coordinates: 50°20′15″N 17°49′40″E
- Country: Poland
- Voivodeship: Opole
- County: Prudnik
- Gmina: Głogówek
- First mentioned: 4 January 1321

Population (2021)
  - Total: 351
- Time zone: UTC+1 (CET)
  - Summer (DST): UTC+2
- Postal code: 48-250
- Area code: +4877
- Vehicle registration: OPR

Dzierżysławice ([d͡ʑɛrʐɨswaˈvit͡sɛ], additional name in German: Dirschelwitz) is a village in the administrative district of Gmina Głogówek, within Prudnik County, Opole Voivodeship, southern Poland. It is situated in the historical region of Prudnik Land.

As of 31 December 2021, the village's population numbered 351 inhabitants. A significant portion of them belongs to the German minority in Poland.

== Geography ==
The village is located in the southern part of Opole Voivodeship, close to the Czech Republic–Poland border. It is situated in the historical Prudnik Land region, as well as in Upper Silesia. It lies in the Silesian Lowlands, in the valley of Osobłoga river. The sołectwo of Dzierżysławice has an area of 822 hectares (2,030 acres).

=== Integral parts ===
According to the National Register of Geographical Names for 2025, the village of Dzierżysławice had 1 integral part, classified as a part of the village (część wsi): Kolonia.

== Etymology ==
The name Dzierżysławice was derived from the name Dzierżysław. Historically, the village was known in Polish as Dzierżysławice and Dyrślowice. The name was adopted into the German language as Dirschelwitz.

Following the Second World War, the historic Polish name Dzierżysławice was confirmed official by the Commission for the Determination of Place Names. As Gmina Głogówek gained the bilingual status on 1 December 2009, the government introduced an additional German name for the village: Dirschelwitz.

== History ==
Traces of human presence in the area of the present-day village of Dzierżysławice, confirmed by archaeological research, date back to the Neolithic. Findings from the Bronze Age confirm the existence of a settlement since the pre-tribal period. A cremation cemetery was also discovered.

The village's name was first recorded in a document published on 4 January 1321 in Głogówek. On 20 July 1390, Duke Vladislaus II of Opole ordered the village headman to pay a fine regularly in two installments under pain of a church curse, which was to be imposed by the Bishop of Wrocław, Wenceslaus II of Legnica.

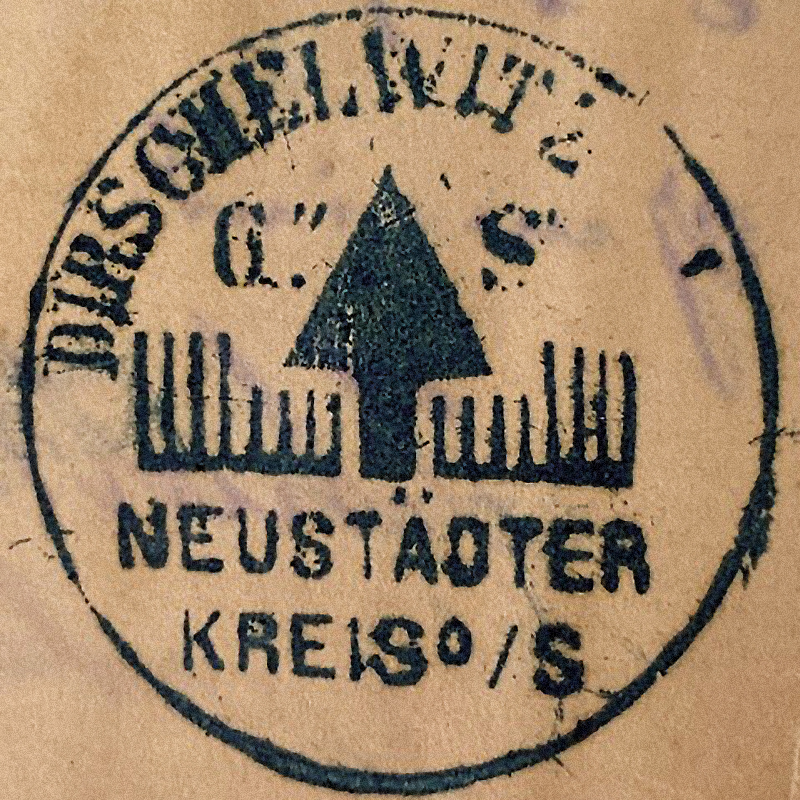
20th-century sigil

Until 1532 it was part of the Piast-ruled Duchy of Opole and Racibórz formed as a result of the medieval fragmentation of Poland into smaller duchies. Afterwards, it was integrated into the Bohemian Crown and Habsburg Empire, administratively becoming part of Głogówek County (circulus superioris Glogoviae) until 1742, and returning to Polish rule under the House of Vasa from 1645 to 1666. After the First Silesian War, it was annexed by the Kingdom of Prussia was incorporated into Prudnik County (Großkreis Neustadt). The village was divided into two parts: Gräflich Dirschelwitz and Freiherrlich Dirschelwitz. In 1784, Gräflich Dirschelwitz, owned by the rulers of Głogówek, counted 25 farmers, two mills, 23 gardeners, 5 cotters, and 300 residents. Freiherrlich Dirschelwitz, owned by baron von Gruttschreiber, had a barbican, 11 gardeners, and 87 residents. In the half of the 19th century, a chapel was raised where a church once stood. The village had its own sigil.

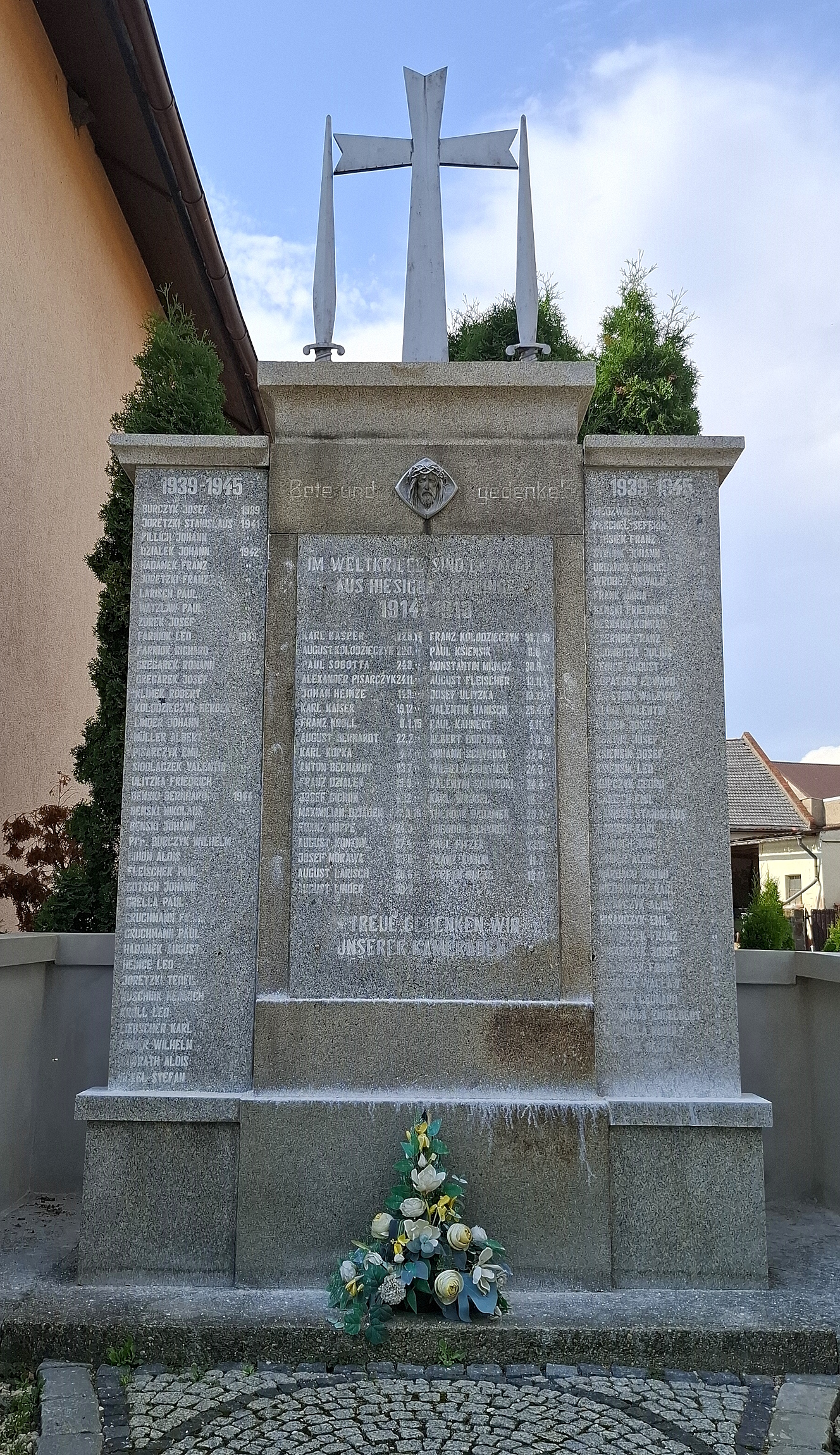
War monument

According to the 1 December 1910 census, among 791 inhabitants of Dzierżysławice, 47 spoke German, 677 spoke Polish, and 67 were bilingual. After the First World War, a monument dedicated to people from Dzierżysławice who died in the war, was erected in the village. Only a portion of Prudnik County participated in the 1921 Upper Silesia plebiscite, which was supposed to determine ownership of the Province of Upper Silesia between Germany and Poland. Dzierżysławice found itself in the eastern part of the county, within the plebiscite area. 467 people od Dzierżysławice voted to remain in Germany, and 71 voted to reunite with Poland. In the end, the area of Prudnik, along with Dzierżysławice, remained in Germany. The Wawelberg Group stored explosives, firearms, and ammunition in Karol Jurecki's barn in Dzierżysławice. Janusz Meissner lived here. The Wawelberg Group destroyed a railway bridge near Dzierżysławice as a part of Operation "Bridges", which started the Third Silesian Uprising on 2 May 1921.

Following the Second World War, from March to May 1945, Prudnik County was controlled by the Soviet military commandant's office. On 11 May 1945, it was passed on to the Polish administration. Autochthonous inhabitants of Biedrzychowice, who either knew Polish or spoke Silesian, were allowed to remain in the village.

The village became a part of Silesian Voivodeship in 1945. It belongs to Opole Voivodeship since 1950. In the years 1945–1954, the village belonged to Gmina Racławice Śląskie in Prudnik County.

The local agricultural production cooperative was established in 1952. The brass band from Dzierżysławice performed during Pope John Paul II's stay in Częstochowa in 1979 and in Góra Świętej Anny in 1983. The village was damaged during the 1997 flood. The local Voluntary Fire Brigade station was constructed in 1998. In 2001, Dzierżysławice joined the Opole Village Renewal Program. The village was flooded during the 2024 flood.

== Demographics ==
Dzierżysławice is inhabited by autochthonous Silesians and Germans. The residents speak the Prudnik dialect of the Silesian language. The villaged gained the bilingual Polish-German status in 2009.

== Transport ==
The Katowice–Legnica railway (rail line number 137), which connects Upper and Lower Silesia regions, runs in the vicinity of Dzierżysławice. The closest railway station is located in Głogówek. County road number 1209O (Mochów—Dzierżysławice—Racławice Śląskie) runs through the village. The local public transport buses were operated by PKS Prudnik. Since 2021, public transit is organized by the PGZT "Pogranicze" corporation in Prudnik.

== Institutions ==
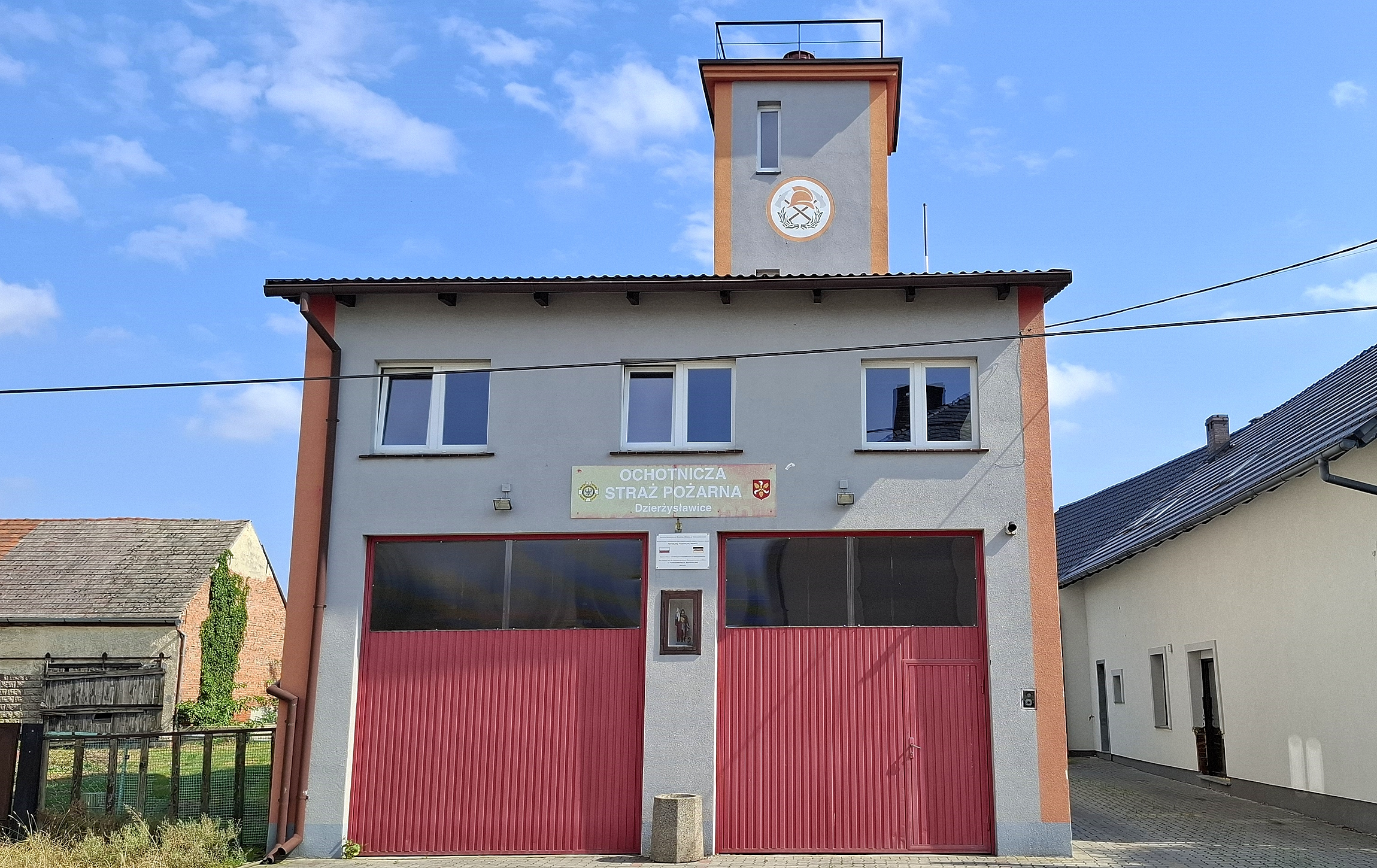
Fire station

Institutions located in Dzierżysławice include:

- German Friendship Circle (Deutscher Freundeskreis), a subsidiary of the Social-Cultural Society of Germans in Opole Silesia
- Voluntary Fire Brigade (OSP)

== Religion ==
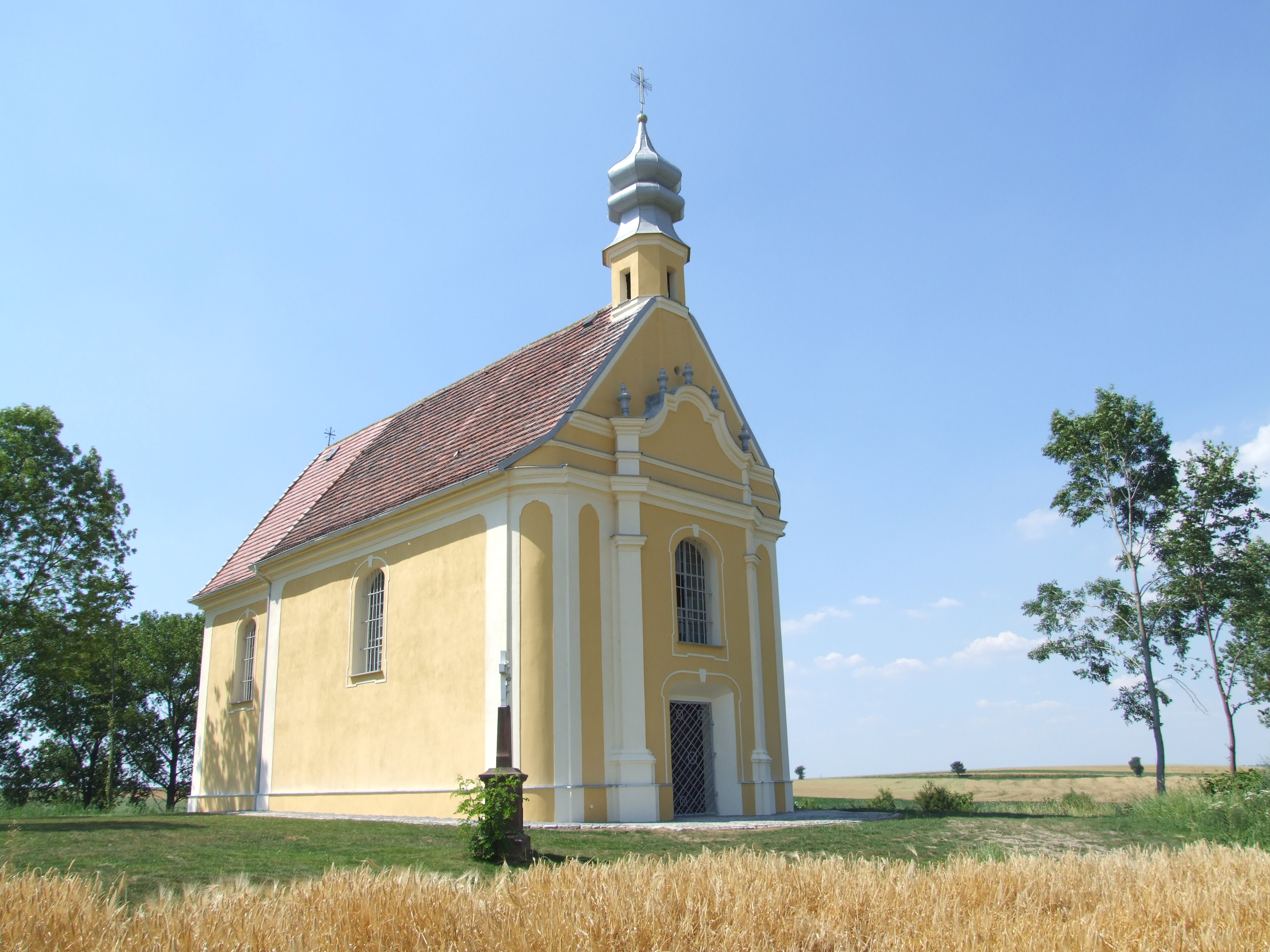
Blessed Virgin Mary church

The Roman Catholic Blessed Virgin Mary church is located in the village. It has become a popular pilgrimage site for people of Głogówek and nearby villages. The church belongs to the Diocese of Opole.

== Bibliography ==
- "Plan odnowy miejscowości Dzierżysławice na lata 2020-2028" (PDF). bip.glogowek.pl (in Polish). 2020.
