= 1st Moscow International Film Festival =

Film festival

- Location: Moscow, USSR
- Founded: 1959
- Awards: Grand Prix
- Festival date: 3–17 August 1959
- Website: Website

The 1st Moscow International Film Festival was held from 3 to 17 August 1959. The Grand Prix was awarded to the Soviet film Destiny of a Man directed by Sergei Bondarchuk.

== Jury ==
- Sergei Gerasimov (USSR - President of the Jury)
- Antonín Brousil (Czechoslovakia)
- Emma Väänänen (Finland)
- Thorold Dickinson (Great Britain)
- Christian-Jaque (France)
- Kálmán Nádasdy (Hungary)
- Hans Rodenberg (East Germany)
- Bimal Roy (India)
- Henri Storck (Belgium)
- Jerzy Toeplitz (Poland)
- Kiyohiko Ushihara (Japan)
- Zhang Junxiang (China)
- Sergei Yutkevich (USSR)

== Films in competition ==
The following films were selected for the main competition:

English title	Original title	Director(s)	Production country
Escape from the Shadows	Útek ze stínu	Jiří Sequens	Czechoslovakia
Yesterday	Tegnap	Márton Keleti	Hungary
For Whom the Sun Rises	Liman tashrouk al chams	Joseph Fahdi	Lebanon
The Diary of Anne Frank	—N/a	George Stevens	United States
India: Matri Bhumi	India	Roberto Rossellini	Italy, France
Red Line	Punainen viiva	Matti Kassila	Finland
That Won't Keep a Sailor Down	Das haut einen Seemann doch nicht um	Arthur Maria Rabenalt	West Germany, Denmark
Jalsaghar	Jalsaghar	Satyajit Ray	India
Aren't We Wonderful?	Wir Wunderkinder	Kurt Hoffmann	West Germany
The Ball	Mingea	Andrei Blaier, Sinisa Ivetici	Romania
On the Side of One River	Chung một dòng sông	Nguyễn Hồng Nghi, Phạm Hiếu Dân	North Vietnam
Forever Yours	حب للأبد	Youssef Chahine	Egypt
The Day Shall Dawn	—N/a	A. J. Kardar	Pakistan, United Kingdom
Hambre nuestra de cada día	Hambre nuestra de cada dia	Rogelio A. González	Mexico
Unforgettable Trail	Itsuka kita michi	Koji Shima	Japan
Die unvollkommene Ehe	Die unvollkommene Ehe	Robert A. Stemmle	Austria
New Story of the Old Soldier	—N/a	Shen Fu	China
Cara de Fogo	—N/a	Galileu Garcia	Brazil
The Eagle	Orzel	Leonard Buczkowski	Poland
The Sailor's Song	Das Lied der Matrosen	Kurt Maetzig, Günter Reisch	East Germany
Summer Place Wanted	Sommarnöje sökes	Hasse Ekman	Sweden
Messenger of the People	Ardyn elch	Dejidiin Jigjid	Mongolia
The Verdict	La sentence	Jean Valère	France
Said effendi	سعيد أفندي	Kameran Husni	Iraq
Legend of Chunhyang	Chunhyangdyun	Yun Ryon Gyu	North Korea
The Sky Through the Trees	Kroz granje nebo	Stole Janković	Yugoslavia
A Cry from the Streets	—N/a	Lewis Gilbert	United Kingdom
Destiny of a Man	Sudba cheloveka	Sergei Bondarchuk	Soviet Union
Tana	Tana	Kristaq Dhamo	Albania
Fanfare	—N/a	Bert Haanstra	Netherlands

== Awards ==
- Grand Prix: Destiny of a Man by Sergei Bondarchuk
- Golden Medals:
  - Aren't We Wonderful? by Kurt Hoffmann
  - The Day Shall Dawn by A. J. Kardar
  - Escape from the Shadows by Jiří Sequens
- Silver Medals:
  - Actors: Wieńczysław Gliński, Bronisław Pawlik and Aleksander Sewruk for The Eagle
  - Actress: Pureviin Tsevelsuren for Messenger of the People
  - Director of Photography: Un Thak for Legend of Chunhyang
  - Composer: Ustad Vilayat Khan for Jalsaghar
  - Director: Lewis Gilbert for A Cry from the Streets
- Diplomas:
  - Koji Shima for Unforgettable Trail
  - Jean Valère for The Verdict
