= List of Pakistani submissions for the Academy Award for Best International Feature Film =

List of Pakistani submissions for an Academy Award

Best International Feature Film submissions from Pakistan

Highlights
- Debut: 1959
- Submissions: 14
- Nominations: none
- Oscar winners: none

Pakistan has submitted films for the Academy Award for Best International Feature Film since 1959. The award is presented annually by the United States Academy of Motion Picture Arts and Sciences to a feature-length film produced outside the United States and its territories with a predominantly non-English dialogue track. Eligible submissions may be live-action, animated, or documentary features. (Note: The category was known as the Academy Award for Best Foreign Language Film until April 2019, when the Academy renamed it Best International Feature Film, stating that the word "Foreign" was outdated and that the new title better represented the category.) The category became an annual competitive award in 1956; before then, the Academy had presented special awards for foreign-language films.

As of 2026, Pakistan has submitted fourteen films, but none of them were nominated.

== Submissions ==
Under the Academy's current rules, each country or region may submit one film for International Feature Film consideration through an Academy-approved selection committee. Eligible films must be feature-length works produced outside the United States and its territories, with a predominantly non-English dialogue track and accurate, legible English-language subtitles. Nominations are determined in two rounds: a preliminary vote selects a 15-film shortlist, and a nominations vote selects the five nominees.

Pakistan's first submission was The Day Shall Dawn (1959), followed by Ghunghat (1963). After Ghunghat, Pakistan did not submit another film for five decades, until the Pakistani Academy Selection Committee selected Zinda Bhaag (2013).

Joyland (2022) advanced to the December shortlists, but it was not nominated.

Since July 2023, Pakistani filmmaker Mohammed Ali Naqvi was appointed chairman of the Pakistan Academy Selection Committee, succeeding Sharmeen Obaid-Chinoy. For the 98th Academy Awards, no Pakistani film appeared on the Academy's final list of eligible international feature films for that ceremony. Hanging by a Wire (2026), marked the first documentary selected to represent the country.

Most of the films submitted are primary in Urdu. The following films have been submitted by Pakistan for the Academy Award for Best International Feature Film.

Year (Ceremony)	Film title used in nomination	Original title	Language(s)	Director(s)	Result
1959 (32nd)	The Day Shall Dawn	جاگو ہوا سویرا	Urdu	A. J. Kardar	Not nominated
1963 (36th)	Ghunghat	گھونگٹ	Urdu	Khwaja Khurshid Anwar	Not nominated
2013 (86th)	Zinda Bhaag	زندہ بھاگ	Punjabi	Meenu Gaur and Farjad Nabi	Not nominated
2014 (87th)	Dukhtar	دختر	Urdu, Pashto	Afia Nathaniel	Not nominated
2015 (88th)	Moor	ماں	Urdu, Pashto	Jami	Not nominated
2016 (89th)	Mah e Mir	ماہ میر	Urdu	Anjum Shahzad	Not nominated
2017 (90th)	Saawan	ساون	Urdu	Farhan Alam	Not nominated
2018 (91st)	Cake	کیک	Urdu	Asim Abbasi	Not nominated
2019 (92nd)	Laal Kabootar	لال کبوتر	Urdu	Kamal Khan	Not nominated
2020 (93rd)	Circus of Life	زندگی تماشا	Urdu, Punjabi	Sarmad Khoosat	Not nominated
2022 (95th)	Joyland	جوائے لینڈ	Urdu, Punjabi	Saim Sadiq	Made shortlist
2023 (96th)	In Flames	شعلوں میں	Urdu	Zarrar Kahn	Not nominated
2024 (97th)	The Glassworker	شیشہ گر	Urdu, English	Usman Riaz	Not nominated
2026 (99th)	Hanging by a Wire	ہینگنگ بائی اے وائر	English, Urdu, Pashtu	Mohammed Ali Naqvi	Pending

== See also ==
- List of Academy Award winners and nominees for Best International Feature Film
- List of countries by number of Academy Awards for Best International Feature Film
- List of Pakistani Academy Award winners and nominees
