= Szczepanowice (disambiguation) =

Szczepanowice is a district of Opole, south-west Poland.

Szczepanowice may also refer to:

- Szczepanowice, Kraków County in Lesser Poland Voivodeship (south Poland)
- Szczepanowice, Tarnów County in Lesser Poland Voivodeship (south Poland)
- Szczepanowice, Łódź Voivodeship (central Poland)
