= Andrei Blaier =

Romanian film director and screenwriter

- Born: 15 May 1933; Bucharest, Kingdom of Romania
- Died: 1 December 2011 (aged 78); Bucharest, Romania
- Resting place: Bellu Cemetery, Bucharest
- Education: Institute of Theatre and Film I.L. Caragiale
- Occupations: Film director, screenwriter
- Notable work: The Ball (1958); Through the Ashes of the Empire (1976)
- Awards: National Order of Faithful Service

Andrei Blaier (15 May 1933 – 1 December 2011) was a Romanian film director and screenwriter. His 1958 film The Ball was entered into the 1st Moscow International Film Festival.

== Biography ==
=== Early life and education ===
Born in Bucharest, he attended the Ion Luca Caragiale High School and then graduated in 1956 from the I.L. Caragiale Institute of Theatre and Film Arts.

=== Award ===
In 2002, Blaier was awarded the National Order of Faithful Service, Knight rank.

=== Death ===
He died in 2011 in Bucharest and was buried at the Bellu Catholic Cemetery.

== Selected filmography ==
=== Director ===
- Ora "H" (1956)
- Prima melodie (1958)
- The Ball (Mingea, 1958)
- Furtuna (1960)
- A fost prietenul meu (1962)
- Casa neterminată (1964)
- Diminețile unui băiat cuminte (1967)
- Apoi s-a născut legenda (1968)
- Vilegiatura (1971)
- Pădurea pierdută (1971)
- Cireșarii (TV series, 1972)
- Ilustrate cu flori de câmp (1975)
- Through the Ashes of the Empire (Prin cenușa imperiului, 1976/1978)
- Urgia (1977)
- Trepte spre cer (1977)
- Totul pentru fotbal (1978)
- Lumini și umbre (1979–1982)
- Întunericul alb (1982)
- Fapt divers (1984)
- Rîdeți ca-n viață (1985)
- Bătălia din umbră (1986)
- Vacanța cea mare (1988)
- Dreptatea (1989)
- Momentul adevărului (1989)
- Divorț... din dragoste (1992)
- Crucea de piatră (1993)
- Terente – regele bălților (1995)
- Dulcea saună a morții (2003)
