= The Ball (1958 film) =

1958 film

- Directed by: Andrei Blaier; Sinișa Ivetici
- Starring: Lazăr Vrabie; Ion Bodeanu; Andrei Codarcea
- Cinematography: Lupu Gutman
- Release date: 1958
- Running time: 94 minutes
- Country: Romania
- Language: Romanian

The Ball (Romanian: Mingea "ball" in the sense of a football) is a 1958 Romanian drama film directed by Andrei Blaier and Sinișa Ivetici. It was entered into the 1st Moscow International Film Festival. In the Romania of the 1930s the economic crisis has serious impact on society. A teacher is fired from work and fights to make ends meet, while his paralyzed son dreams of a soccer ball with which to play. The father falls in with communist activists, one of whom helps him find a ball for his son.

== Cast ==
- Lazăr Vrabie as the Father
- Ion Bodeanu as Ionel
- Andrei Codarcea as Chiriță
- Sandu Sticlaru as the Policeman
- Ion Ulmeni as the High School Principal
- Antoaneta Glodeanu as the wife of Chiriță
- Constantin Vaeni
