= Through the Ashes of the Empire =

- Directed by: Andrei Blaier
- Story by: Zaharia Stancu (novel)
- Starring: Gheorghe Dinică; Gabriel Oseciuc
- Cinematography: Dinu Tănase
- Release date: 1976
- Running time: 101 minutes
- Country: Romania
- Language: Romanian

Through the Ashes of the Empire (Romanian: Prin cenușa imperiului) is a 1976 Romanian war drama film directed by Andrei Blaier. It is a picaresque tale of betrayal, survival and coming of age based on the novel Jocul cu moartea by Zaharia Stancu.

== Plot ==
In 1917, during World War I, the Diplomate and young Darie escape from a Bucharest occupied by the German Army only to come across, as they progress 'through the ashes' of the Austro-Hungarian Empire, the sufferance, despair, generosity and heroism that will lead them to very different conclusions.

== Cast ==
- Gheorghe Dinică as the Diplomate
- Gabriel Oseciuc as young Darie
- Cornel Coman as Spelbul
- Ștefan Sileanu as Siteavul
- Ferenc Bencze as Dodu
- Ernest Maftei as the Lăutar
- Jean Reder as the Sergeant (Feldwebel)
- Constantin Rauțchi as a Romanian prisoner
- Teodor Pîcă as the white-bearded prisoner
- Nucu Păunescu as another prisoner
- Petre Gheorghiu as the prisoner with glasses
- Traian Petruț as another prisoner
- Ion Porsilă as another prisoner
- Anton Aftenie as Nea Aftenie, another prisoner
- Mircea Jida as a young prisoner
- Boris Ciornei as the Fisherman
- Károly Sinka as the German officer
- Irina Petrescu as the Serbian woman
- Florina Cercel as a Greek woman
- Elena Albu as another Greek woman
- Corneliu Gîrbea as the Serbian partisan leader
- Mircea Bașta as the socialist militant
- Andrei Codarcea as the Serbian interpreter
- Gheorghe Tomescu
- Nicolae Praida as the police commissioner
- Constantin Vîrtejanu
- Marieta Luca
- Emil Raisenauer
- Nicolae Simion
- Ion Manolescu
- Victor Radovici

== See also ==
- List of World War I films
- List of films based on war books
