= Włodzimierz Skoczylas =

Polish actor

- Born: 7 May 1923; Jabłonowo Pomorskie, Poland
- Died: 29 September 1993 (aged 70); Lódz, Poland
- Occupation: Actor
- Years active: 1952–1990

Włodzimierz Skoczylas (7 May 1923 – 29 September 1993) was a Polish actor. He appeared in more than 40 films between 1952 and 1990.

== Selected filmography ==
- Five Boys from Barska Street (1954)
- Irena do domu! (1955)
- Zaczarowany rower (1955)
- Milczące ślady (1961)
- The Two Who Stole the Moon (1962)
- Stawka większa niż życie (1967)
