= Farewells =

- Directed by: Wojciech Has
- Written by: Stanisław Dygat; Wojciech Has
- Starring: Tadeusz Janczar; Maria Wachowiak
- Cinematography: Mieczysław Jahoda
- Edited by: Zofia Dwornik
- Music by: Lucjan Kaszycki
- Distributed by: Film Polski
- Release date: 1958
- Running time: 90 minutes
- Language: Polish

Farewells (also titled Lydia Ate the Apple and Partings in the United States; original Polish title: Pożegnania) is a Polish film released in 1958 and directed by Wojciech Has. Taking place in Poland during the late 1930s and early 1940s, this melancholy film evokes the insecurity and despair pervading Poland at the time.

== Premise ==
The story begins immediately before World War II and centers on Pawel (Tadeusz Janczar), a member of a conservative, bourgeois family, and his love for the thoroughly jaded Lidka (Maria Wachowiak), a dancer.

The mismatched pair finds momentary happiness during a trip to the countryside, however social conventions and the lovers' inability to defy them force Pawel and Lidka to part. The times change, war breaks out and ends; Pawel suffers at Auschwitz concentration camp and Lidka marries his cousin.

Years later, the two former lovers rediscover each other much changed, and find that they may still have the capacity for love.

== Cast ==
- Maria Wachowiak as Lidka
- Tadeusz Janczar as Paweł
- Gustaw Holoubek as Mirek
- Stanisław Jaworski as Doctor Janowski
- Stanisław Milski as Professor
- Zdzisław Mrożewski as Paweł's Father
- Irena Netto as Motel Owner
- Józef Pieracki as Professor Michniewicz
- Irena Starkówna Countess Róza
- Helena Sokolowska as Aunt Waleria Siekierzynska
- Hanna Skarzanka as Maryna
- Jarema Stepowski as Waiter
- Saturnin Zórawski as Butler Feliks

== Production ==
The film is an adaptation of a lyrical and reflective novel by Stanisław Dygat, with a screenplay written by Dygat himself and Has.

== See also ==
- Cinema of Poland
- List of Polish language films
