= Jadwiga Żylińska =

Polish author

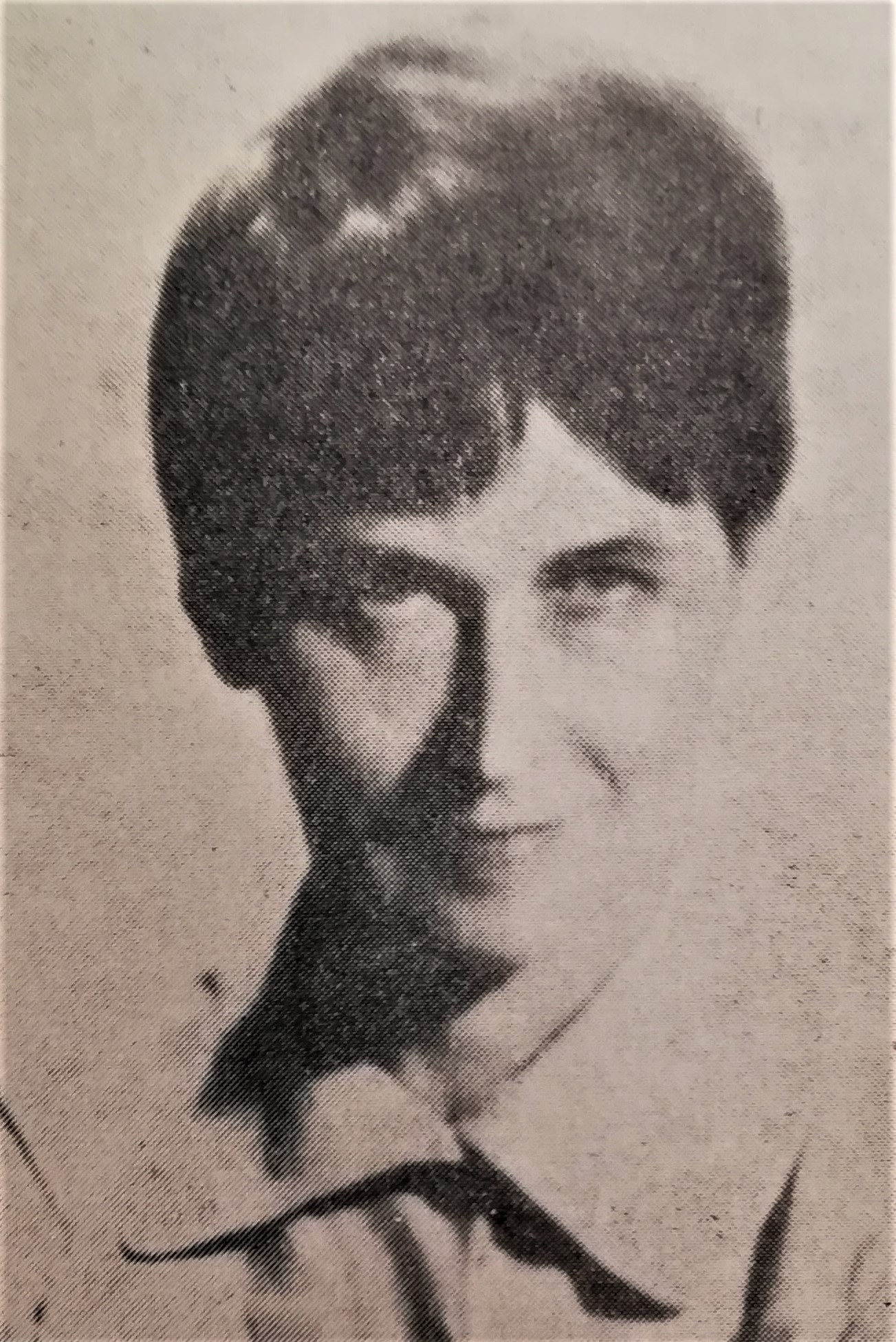
- Born: 17 August 1910; Breslau, German Empire
- Died: 25 April 2009 (aged 98); Warsaw, Poland

Jadwiga Żylińska (17 August 1910 – 25 April 2009) was a Polish author. Mainly a novelist and essayist, she also wrote the screenplay for Rozstanie (1961). Author of the historical novel based on archaeological findings from the matriarchal societies of the Neolithic and Bronze Ages Kapłanki, amazonki i czarownice (1972).
