= List of Pakistani Academy Award winners and nominees =

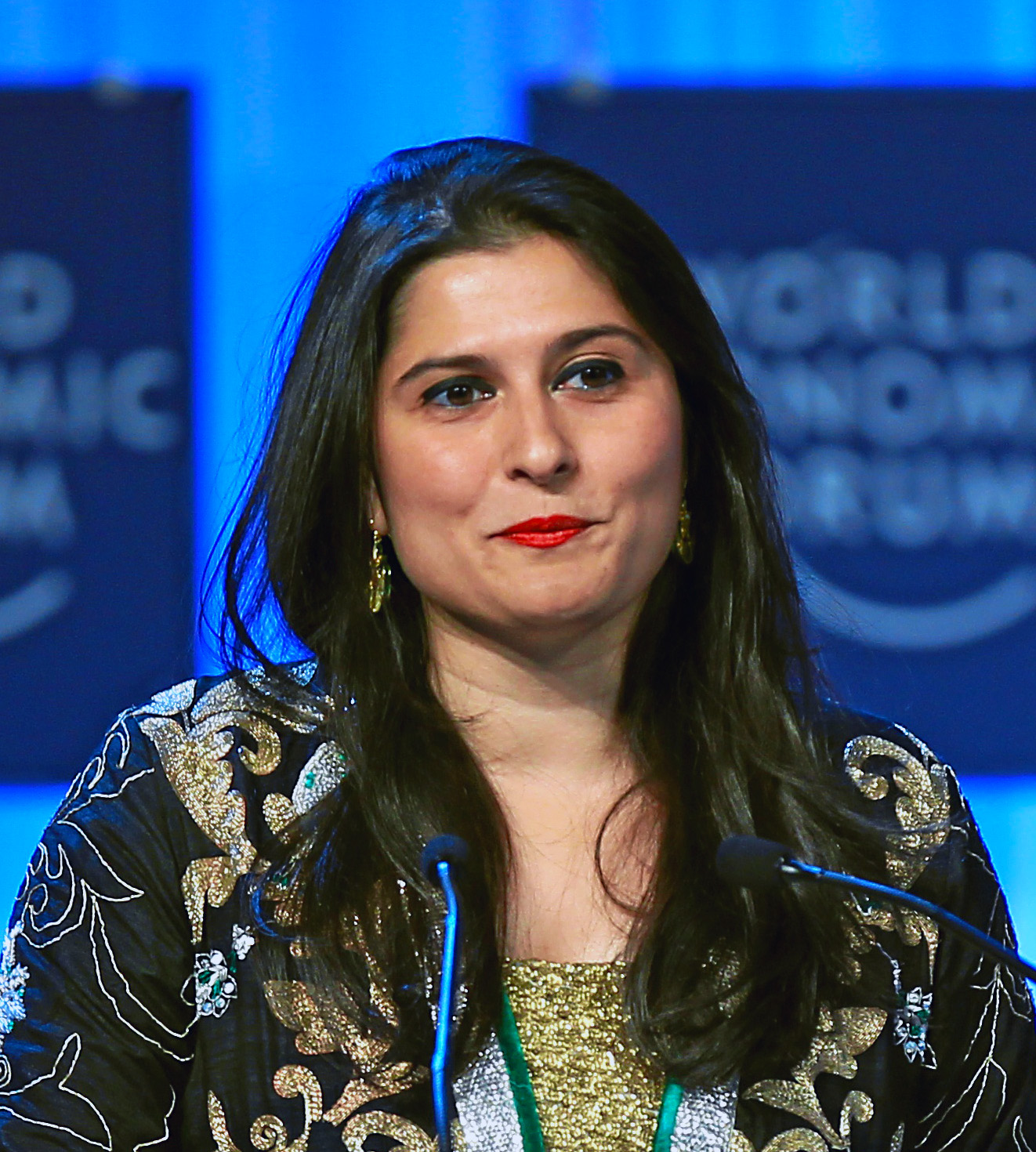
Sharmeen Obaid Chinoy became the first Oscar-winner for Pakistan

This is the list of Pakistani personalities who are Academy Award (informally known as Oscar) winners and nominees.

== Winners and nominees ==
In 2012, Sharmeen Obaid-Chinoy became the first Pakistani to win an Oscar, winning the Academy Award for Best Documentary Short Subject alongside co-director Daniel Junge for their film Saving Face. She won again in 2016 for the film A Girl in the River: The Price of Forgiveness, becoming the first female filmmaker to win twice in this category.

In 2018, Pakistani-American actor/comedian Kumail Nanjiani became the first Pakistani nominee for a writing award, nominated alongside Emily V. Gordon for their screenplay for The Big Sick.

In 2022, British-Pakistani actor/rapper Riz Ahmed became the first Muslim to win an Oscar for Best Live Action Short Film. He co-wrote and starred in the film, winning alongside the film's director Aneil Karia.

As per the Academy's rules for the Best Visual Effects category, a maximum of only four individuals are credited as nominees for each film. Whilst he has not been named in the nominations, Pakistani visual effects artist Mir Zafar Ali has been a part of the visual effects team for two winners in this category, The Golden Compass and Life of Pi. Additionally, he was a visual effects artist on the Best Animated Feature winner Frozen.

== List of the Pakistani Oscar winners and nominees ==
Year	Nominee(s)/recipient(s)	Film	Category	Result/received	Ref.
2012 (84th)	Sharmeen Obaid-Chinoy shared with (Daniel Junge)	Saving Face	Best Documentary Short Subject	Won	
2016 (88th)	Sharmeen Obaid-Chinoy	A Girl in the River: The Price of Forgiveness	Best Documentary Short Subject	Won	
2018 (90th)	Kumail Nanjiani shared with (Emily V. Gordon)	The Big Sick	Best Original Screenplay	Nominated	
2021 (93rd)	Riz Ahmed	Sound of Metal	Best Actor	Nominated	
2022 (94th)	Riz Ahmed shared with (Aneil Karia)	The Long Goodbye	Best Live Action Short Film	Won	

== See also ==
- List of Pakistani submissions for the Academy Award for Best International Feature Film
