= Janusz Meissner =

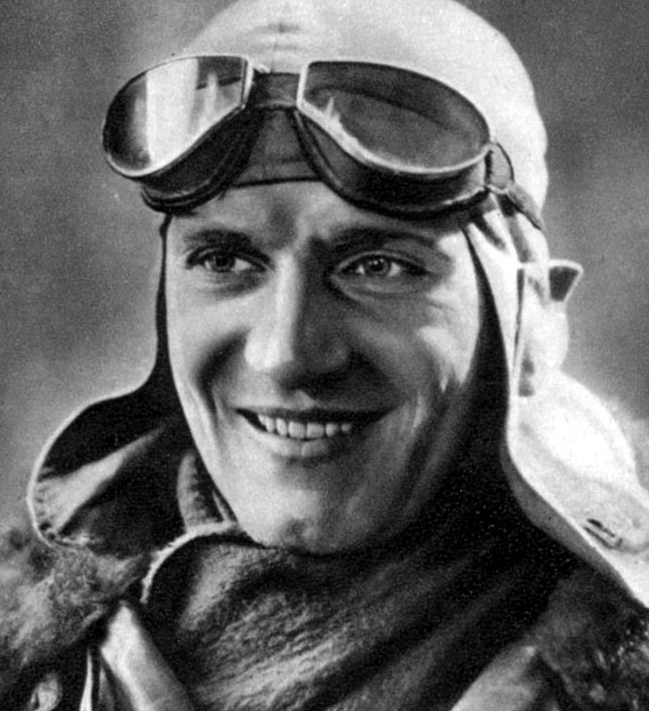
- Born: 21 January 1901; Warsaw, Russian Empire
- Died: 28 February 1978 (aged 77); Kraków, Poland
- Occupations: pilot, soldier, journalist, author

Janusz Meissner (pen name: "porucznik Herbert," English: "Flt Lt Herbert"; 21 January 1901 in Warsaw – 28 February 1978 in Kraków) was a Polish writer and journalist, and a pilot of Polish Air Force.

== Life ==
In late 1919 Meissner completed pilot training at Kraków's Lower Pilot School (Niższa Szkoła Pilotów), and in March 1920, at Poznań's Higher Pilot School (Wyższa Szkoła Pilotów). From July 1920 he served in the Polish-Soviet War, in the newly formed Toruńska Eskadra Wywiadowcza (Toruń Reconnaissance Squadron) in the rank of pilot sergeant. For his combat flight of 16 July 1920, he was decorated with the – newly introduced – Cross of Valor, and promoted to lieutenant.

After the Polish-Soviet War he participated in the preparations for the Third Silesian Uprising and in actual terror operations beginning 2/3 May 1921, commanding a special-forces detachment of the Wawelberg Group. For his contribution to the success of the Uprising, he was decorated with the Virtuti Militari (Poland's highest military decoration), 5th class, on 27 June 1922, and with the Cross of Independence with Swords.

After the Silesian Uprisings he was discharged from the army and returned to civilian life. After an unsuccessful attempt to become a businessman he returned to the military in 1922 and remained until 1946. He served as chief pilot in Polish Air Force Academy (Wyższa Szkoła Oficerska Sił Powietrznych). From 1944 he was an officer in the RAF. In 1946 he returned to Poland to live in Zakopane. In 1956 he moved to Kraków, where he died.

He left two sons: Andrzej and Jerzy.

== Works ==
=== Books in Polish ===
Meissner is most known as the author of 48 popular books on flying, pilots, sea, pirates, sport, as well as hunting.

- Szkoła orląt ("School of Eagles")
- L jak Lucy (L for Lucy)
- Żądło Genowefy (G – for Genevieve)
- trilogy: Czarna bandera, Czerwone krzyże, Zielona brama ("Black Ensign", "Red Crosses", "Green Gate")
- Trzy diamenty
- Sześciu z "Daru Pomorza"

=== Movies ===
Meissner was a writer of:

- Gwiaździsta eskadra (about flying)
- Orzeł (about submarines)
- Sprawa pilota Maresza (about flying)
- Wraki (about diving)

=== Books in English ===
- Meissner, Janusz (1943). Polish wings over Europe.
- Meissner, Janusz (1944). G – for Genevieve. Roy Publishers. "Janusz Meissner."
- Meissner, Janusz (1945). L for Lucy.
