= Wiktor Wiechaczek =

Polish soldier (1879–1941)

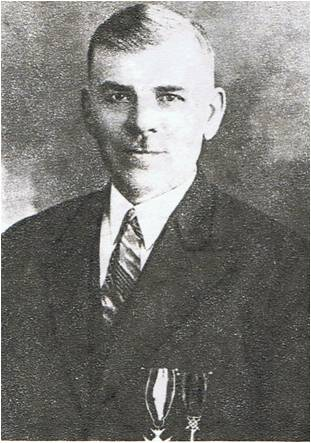
Wiktor Wiechaczek.

Wiktor Wiechaczek (nom de guerre Oset; 10 October 1879 – 3 June 1941) was a Polish soldier, who participated in the Silesian Uprisings. Born on 10 October 1879 in Ruda Śląska, Wiechaczek was a Polish patriot, living in Upper Silesia, which then belonged to Germany. In 1913 he took part in a strike in the Pawel coal mine, for which he was fired. During WW1 he was fighting in the western front for the German Empire. After 1918, Wiechaczek actively participated in pro-Polish movement in Silesia, and together with Józef Trojok, he was one of leaders of the First Silesian Uprising. In 1921, he was a member of the Wawelberg Group (BTW the only one from Upper Silesia, all the other members were from Poland), and for his activities, Wiechaczek was awarded the Virtuti Militari cross, number 7840.

Wiechaczek was arrested by the Germans on 3 May 1940, and transported to the Dachau concentration camp, and later to Oranienburg where he died on 3 June 1941.

== Sources ==
- ¶wiêtoch³owice / wiktor wiechaczek at swiony.pl
