= Aleksander Sewruk =

Polish actor

- Born: 17 January 1912; Kornin, Russian Empire (now Zhytomyr Oblast, Ukraine)
- Died: 23 November 1974 (aged 62); Warsaw, Poland
- Occupation: Actor

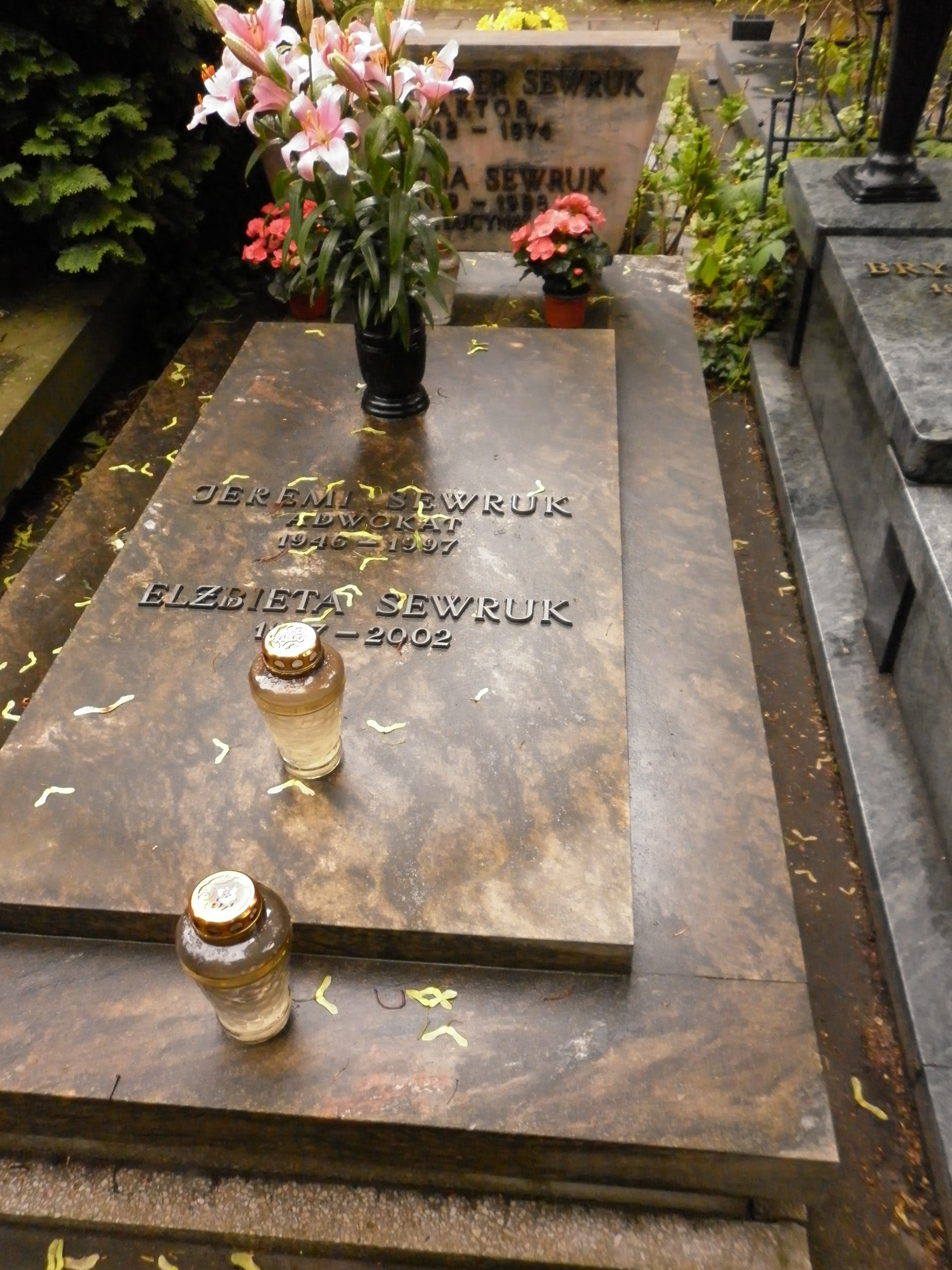
Grave of Sewruk at Powązki Military Cemetery in Warsaw

Aleksander Sewruk (17 January 1912 – 23 November 1974) was a Polish actor. He appeared in more than 20 films between 1954 and 1974. At the 1st Moscow International Film Festival he won a Silver Medal for acting for his role in the film The Eagle.

== Filmography ==
Year	Title	Role	Notes
1954	Celuloza	Police Commander Wajszyc	
1954	Pod gwiazda frygijska	Wajszyc	
1955	Godziny nadziei	Coalminer Dosiad from France	
1955	Zaczarowany rower	Wanicki	
1958	Ashes and Diamonds	Swiecki	
1959	Night Train	Lawyer	
1959	The Eagle	Cmdr. Kozlowski	
1960	Szklana góra		
1961	Tonight a City Will Die	Guard	Uncredited
1961	Milczace slady	Drunkard Mieciu	
1961	Zaduszki	Szary	
1964	Giuseppe w Warszawie		
1964	Rachunek sumienia	Aleksy	
1964	Panienka z okienka	Karczmarz	
1965	Glos ma prokurator		
1967	Kochajmy syrenki	Dewizowy mysliwy	
1968	Dancing w kwaterze Hitlera	Kombatant	
1968	Tabliczka marzenia	ojciec Ludki	
1970	Album polski	Doctor	
1970	Romantyczni	Inn Owner	
1971	Epilog norymberski	G. Lawrence	
1972	Anatomia milosci	Priest	
1974	Gniazdo		
1975	Nights and Days	Dr. Wettler	
