= Irena Netto =

Polish actress

- Born: 19 October 1899; Dąbrowa Górnicza, Poland
- Died: 13 March 1992 (aged 92); Skolimów, Poland
- Occupation: Actress
- Years active: 1947–1969

Irena Netto (19 October 1899 – 13 March 1992) was a Polish actress. She appeared in 34 films between 1947 and 1969.

== Selected filmography ==
- Farewells (1958)
- Samson (1961)
- Rozstanie (1961)
