= The Day Shall Dawn =

1959 film

- Film poster
- Urdu: جاگو ہوا سویرا
- Directed by: A. J. Kardar
- Written by: Manik Bandopadhyay; A. J. Kardar
- Screenplay by: Faiz Ahmed Faiz
- Based on: Padma Nadir Majhi by Manik Bandopadhyay
- Produced by: Noman Taseer
- Starring: Khan Ataur Rahman; Tripti Mitra; Zurain Rakshi; Kazi Khaliq; Maina Latif; Rakhshi
- Cinematography: Walter Lassally
- Edited by: Ms. Binvovet
- Music by: Timir Baran; Shantikumar Charthedee
- Release date: 8 May 1959
- Running time: 87 minutes
- Country: Pakistan
- Languages: Urdu; Bengali

The Day Shall Dawn (Urdu: جاگو ہوا سویرا, Jago Hua Savera) is a 1959 Pakistani Bengali-Urdu language drama film directed by A. J. Kardar. The film was selected as the Pakistani entry for the Best Foreign Language Film at the 32nd Academy Awards, but was not accepted as a nominee. It was also entered into the 1st Moscow International Film Festival where it won a Golden Medal. The film was featured in British Film Institute's 2002 critics' poll of "Top ten Pakistani films of all times".

== Cast ==
- Tripti Mitra as Mala
- Zurain Rakshi as Fisherman Mian (as Zuraine)
- Khan Ataur Rahman as Kasim (as Anees Ama)
- Rakhshi
- Kazi Khaliq as Lal Mian (as Kazi Khaleque)
- Maina Latif as Ganju (as Meena Latif)

== Production ==
The Day Shall Dawn was very much a co-production between the two halves of what was then a geographically divided Pakistani state (now independent Pakistan and Bangladesh). The film was shot in Dhaka, East Pakistan (now Bangladesh) by the East Pakistan Film Development Corporation by a director from Lahore (in West Pakistan) and scripted in the Urdu language, which is a link language or lingua franca in the West. He selected Zahir Raihan as assistant director of the film. The film's music was provided by prominent Indian composer Timir Baran.

The film depicts the daily lives of East Pakistani fishermen in the village of Saitnol (near Dhaka) and their struggles with loan sharks. The script was inspired by an original story by Bengali author Manik Bandopadhyay. According to Indian film critic Saibal Chatterjee, it is the only known neo-realist film produced in Pakistan at that time.

== Release ==
Just days before the film was to premier, the new government of Pakistan (under Ayub Khan) asked the film's producer, Nauman Taseer not to release the film. The writer, Faiz Ahmad Faiz, was later imprisoned by the government for his communist beliefs. Actress Tripti Mitra and her husband Sombhu Mitra were also politically left-leaning, and members of the leftist Indian People's Theatre Association in the 1940s. When the film did premier in London, members of Pakistan's High Commission to the United Kingdom disobeyed instructions from the Pakistani government not to attend.

The film won a 'Golden Award' at the Moscow International Film Festival.

== Restoration ==
The film was rediscovered by Western film critics when two Philippe and Alain Jalladeau organized a screen a retrospective of Pakistani films at the 2007 Three Continents Film Festival in Nantes, France. Pakistani filmmaker and professor Shireen Pasha insisted that Jago Hua Zavera should be included as an important piece of Pakistani film history. Anjum Taseer, son of the producer, searched for remaining original copies of the film, and put them together for a version that could be screened. After the film festival, Taseer had the film fully restored, with the work completed in 2010.

The film was screened at the 2008 New York Film Festival, to celebrate its 50th anniversary. It was selected for screening as part of the Cannes Classics section at the 2016 Cannes Film Festival.

Following its screening at the 2016 Cannes Film Festival, the film was scheduled to be premiered at the 18th Mumbai Film Festival on 20 October 2016, but the premier was called off due to protests.

== See also ==
- List of submissions to the 32nd Academy Awards for Best Foreign Language Film
- List of Bangladeshi submissions for the Academy Award for Best Foreign Language Film
- List of Pakistani submissions for the Academy Award for Best Foreign Language Film
- Cinema of Bangladesh
- Cinema of Pakistan
