= Zaharia Stancu =

Romanian prose writer, novelist, poet, and philosopher

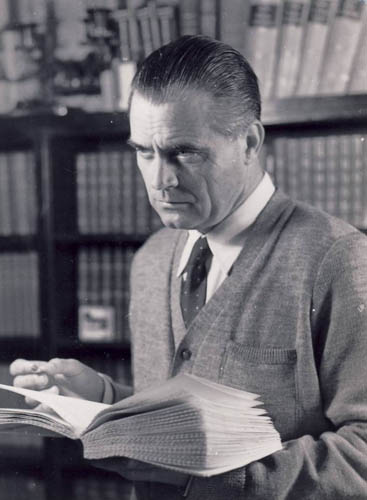
Stancu sometime during the Cold War (from the "Project Communism in Romania Photo Collection")

Zaharia Stancu (Romanian pronunciation: [zahaˈri.a ˈstaŋku]; October 7, 1902 – December 5, 1974) was a Romanian prose writer, novelist, poet, and philosopher. He was also the director of the National Theatre Bucharest, the President of the Writers' Union of Romania, and a titular member of the Romanian Academy.

== Biography ==
Stancu was born in 1902 in Salcia, a village in Teleorman County, Romania. After leaving school at the age of thirteen he worked at various jobs. He worked as tanner, shopkeeper in a grocer's store and in a tobacco store, and clerk at the prefecture. In 1921, with the help of Gala Galaction, he became a journalist. In 1933 he finished his studies in literature and philosophy at the University of Bucharest.

His first volume of poetry, Poeme simple (Simple Poems), appeared in 1927, receiving the Romanian Writers' Prize. During World War II, he was imprisoned for his opposition to the fascist government of Ion Antonescu (see Romania during World War II), and he spent time in the Târgu Jiu internment camp for political prisoners.

In 1946, he became a director of Romania's National Theater. After the Communist regime was established, he was an elected titular member of the Romanian Academy and the President of the Writers' Union of Romania (1966–1974). He won the Romanian State Prize for Literature and, in 1971, he was awarded the Herder Prize by the Austrian government.

Between 1926 and 1944 Stancu published six volumes of poetry. In 1948 his first important novel, Desculț (Barefoot), was published. It has been translated into thirty languages. Other important novels are Șatra (The Gypsy Tribe), Jocul cu moartea (A Gamble with Death), and Pădurea nebună (The Mad Forest). The latter two novels were made into films, Through the Ashes of the Empire and Pădurea nebună.
