= Jiří Sequens =

Czech director

- Born: 23 April 1922; Brno, Czechoslovakia
- Died: 21 January 2008 (aged 85); Prague, Czech Republic
- Occupations: Film & TV Director
- Years active: 1948–2008

Jiří Sequens (23 April 1922 – 21 January 2008) was a Czech film director.

== Life ==
Sequens was born in Brno. After the Second World War, he went to Moscow where he studied film techniques. When he returned to Czechoslovakia he worked for Czechoslovak film industry. Sequens was an author of the propagandistic Czech films/TV series. His 1959 film Útek ze stínu was entered into the 1st Moscow International Film Festival where it won a Golden Medal. His 1964 film Atentát was entered into the 4th Moscow International Film Festival where it won a Golden Prize. Two years later he was a member of the jury of the 5th Moscow International Film Festival. His 1981 film Ta chvíle, ten okamžik won a Special Prize at the 12th Moscow International Film Festival.

He died in a hospital Prague of natural causes.

== Selected filmography ==
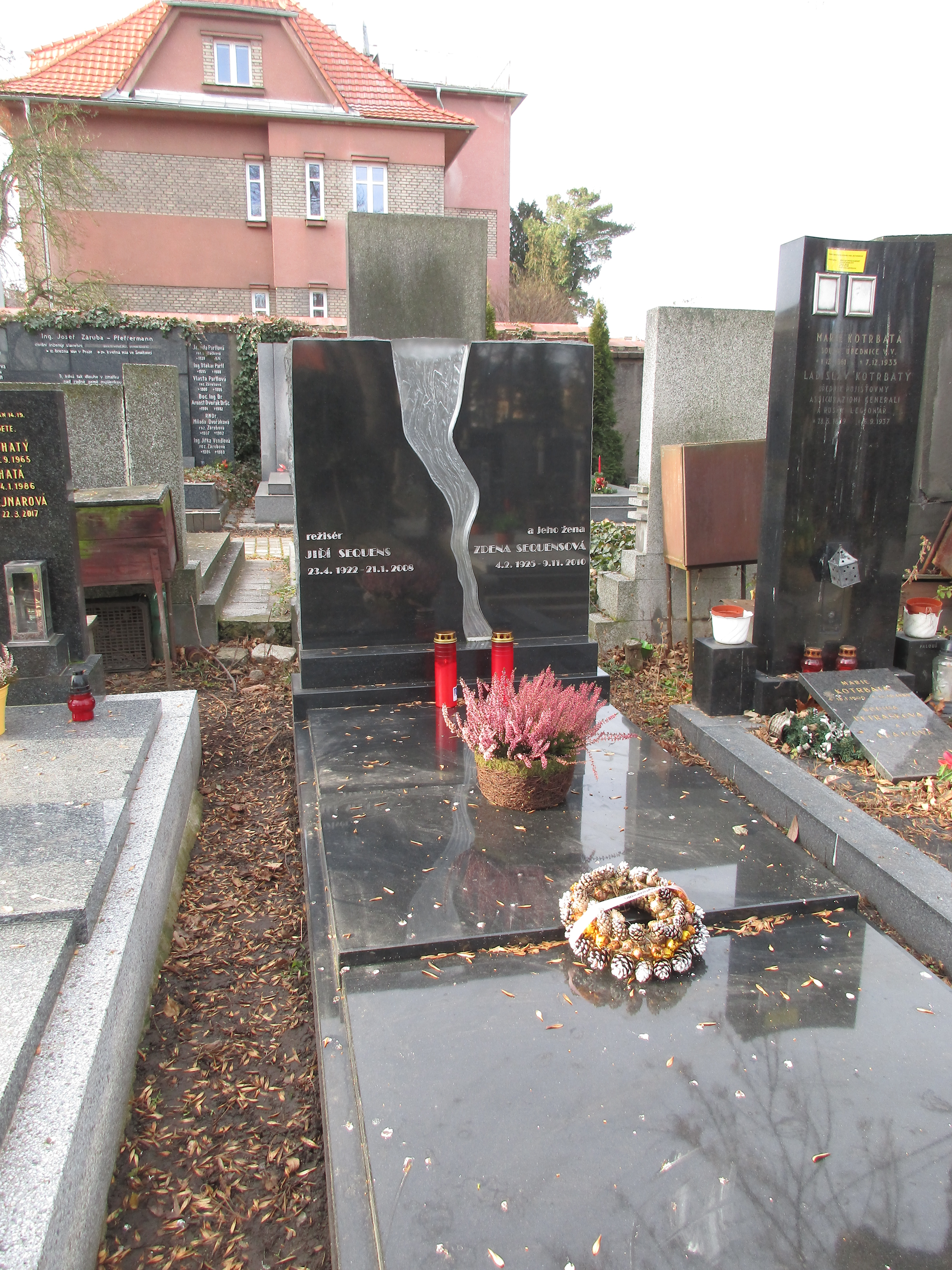
Grave of Jiří Sequens in Bubeneč, Prague

- Třicet případů majora Zemana
- Štědrý večer pana rady Vacátka
- Vražda v hotelu Excelsior
- Partie krásného dragouna
- Pěnička a Paraplíčko
- The Sinful People of Prague
- Atentát
- Větrná hora
