= Sprawa pilota Maresza =

1956 film

- Directed by: Leonard Buczkowski
- Written by: Janusz Meissner, Leonard Buczkowski
- Based on: Niebieskie drogi by Janusz Meissner
- Starring: Wieńczysław Gliński, Lidia Wysocka, Leon Niemczyk
- Cinematography: Seweryn Kruszyński
- Edited by: Zofia Dwornik
- Music by: Jerzy Harald
- Production companies: Wytwórnia Filmów Fabularnych, Łódź
- Release date: 7 April 1956 (Poland)
- Running time: 97 minutes
- Country: Poland
- Language: Polish

Sprawa pilota Maresza is a Polish film directed by Leonard Buczkowski released in 1956. Based on a novel by Janusz Meissner, which was inspired by actual events. One of the first Polish features filmed in color.

== Cast ==
- Wieńczysław Gliński - cpt. Piotr Maresz
- Alicja Raciszówna - Krystyna Flisakówna
- Lidia Wysocka - Mary Godzicka
- Leon Niemczyk - Surowiec
- Jerzy Michotek - Jan Flisak, co-pilot
- Bogdan Niewinowski - Józef Cygan
- Jerzy Kaczmarek - Włodzimierz Elmer
- Kazimierz Wilamowski - Hornowski

== Awards ==
- Złota Kaczka - best film of 1956
