= Wieńczysław Gliński =

Polish actor

- Born: 10 May 1921; Astrakhan, Russian SFSR (now Russia)
- Died: 8 July 2008 (aged 87); Warsaw, Poland
- Occupation: Actor

Wieńczysław Gliński (10 May 1921 – 8 July 2008) was a Polish stage and film actor.

== Biography ==
He was a member of the Polish resistance movement Home Army during World War II. He was also a prisoner in the Nazi German concentration camp Majdanek.

After the war Wieńczysław Gliński has starred in many movies. He has also performed in many theatres, including the Polish Theatre and National Theatre in Warsaw.

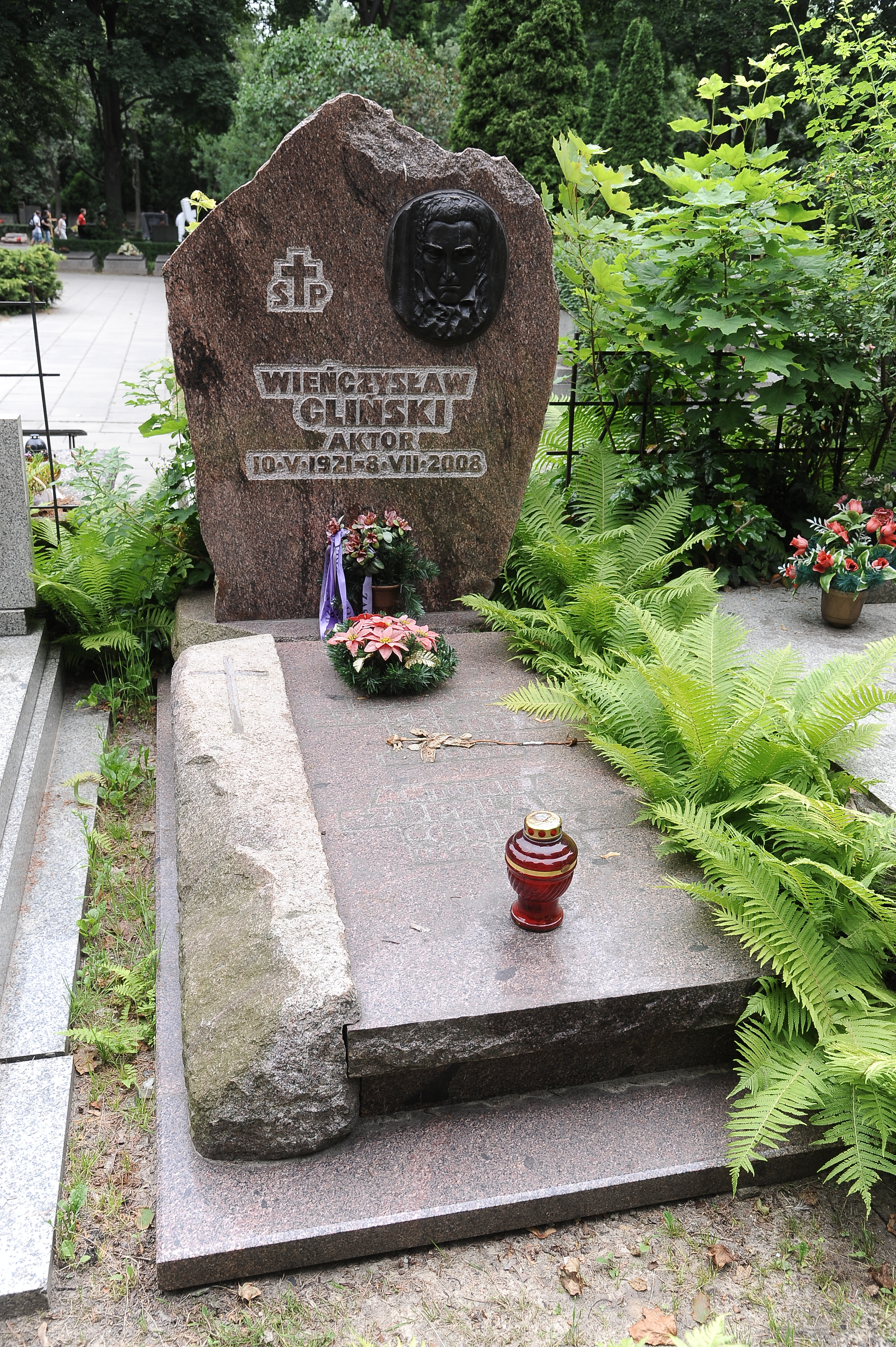
Gliński's grave at Powązki Military Cemetery

A lecturer at the Państwowa Wyższa Szkoła Teatralna in Warsaw.

At the 1st Moscow International Film Festival he won a Silver Medal for acting for his role in the film The Eagle.

== Filmography ==
Year	Title	Role	Notes
1956	Sprawa pilota Maresza	Capt. Piotr Maresz	
1957	Kanał	Lt. 'Zadra'	
1957	Kapelusz pana Anatola	Jerzy	
1957	Spotkania	Waclaw Kisielecki	
1958	Co rekne zena?	Zbigniew Stepowski	
1959	Orzeł	Capt. Grabinski	
1962	Wyrok	redaktor Henryk Opera	
1962	Jutro premiera	rezyser Ryszard Kuryllo	
1962	Spóznieni przechodnie	Karol	(segment "Czas przybliza, czas oddala")
1963	How to Be Loved	Bakteriolog w samolocie	
1963	Ostatni kurs	Lieutenant Szymanski	
1964	Rozwodów nie bedzie	Witness	(episode 1)
1964	Echo	Henryk	
1966	Lekarstwo na miłość	Janusz	
1966	Pieklo i niebo	Judge	Voice, Uncredited
1966	Marysia i Napoleon	Pawel Laczynski	
1967	Gdzie jest trzeci król	professor Gawronski	
1967	Mocne uderzenie	Rezyser telewizyjny Lelewicz	
1967	Dziadek do orzechów	Drosselmajer / E.T.A. Hoffmann	
1970	Liberation	Blacksmith	
1971	Szerokiej drogi, kochanie	Blacksmith	
1972	Szerokiej drogi, kochanie	Dr. Grzegorz Jaron	
1977	Bezkresne łąki	Henryk	
1978	Romans Teresy Hennert	porucznik Julian Gondzill	
1980	Ojciec królowej	French Ambassador	
1980	Tajemnica szyfru Marabuta	Narrator	
1983	Epitafium dla Barbary Radziwiłłówny	Bishop Zebrzydowski	Uncredited
1984	Godnosc	Director	
1984	Ultimatum		
1985	Kim jest ten czlowiek?	pulkownik Kuziemski	
2008	Jeszcze nie wieczór	Himself	(final film role)
