= Gwiaździsta eskadra =

1930 film

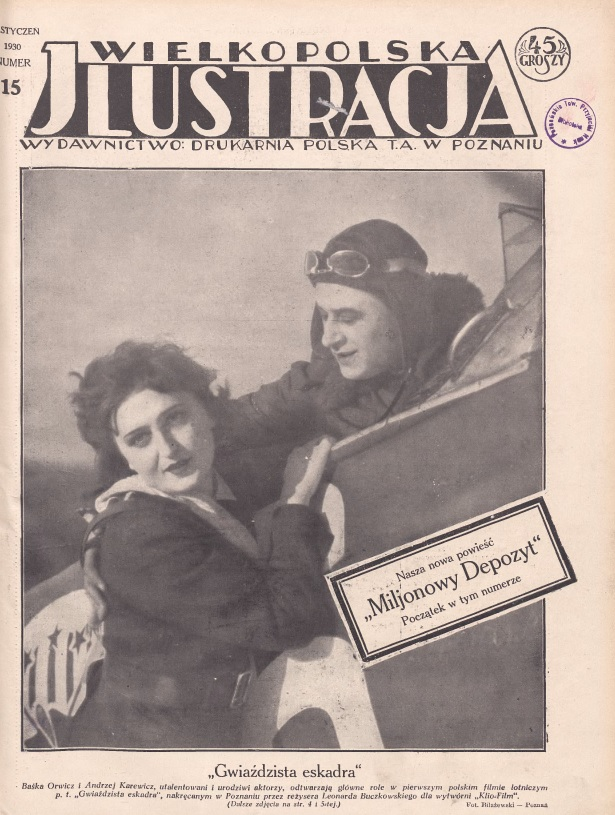
- Directed by: Leonard Buczkowski
- Written by: Janusz Meissner; Zbigniew Lasocki (dialogues)
- Starring: Barbara Orwid
- Cinematography: Antoni Wawrzyniak; Albert Wywerka
- Music by: Tadeusz Górzyński
- Production companies: Klio-Film; Edmund Lisowski (kierownik produkcji)
- Release date: 10 April 1930
- Country: Poland
- Language: Polish

Gwiaździsta eskadra (The Starry Squadron) is a lost 1930 Polish war film directed by Leonard Buczkowski. Shot with the co-operation of the Polish army, it was the most expensive Polish film made before World War II. It was first released as silent film, before later being re-released with sound.

== Plot ==
Gwiaździsta eskadra told the romantic story of love between a Polish girl and an American volunteer pilot in the Polish 7th Air Escadrille (better known as the Kościuszko Squadron) during the Polish-Soviet War of 1919–1921. The story was inspired by the actual life of Merian C. Cooper, a Polish Air Force officer during the war, but much better known for his later career as an adventurer, director, screenwriter and producer.

Cooper fathered Polish translator and writer Maciej Słomczyński during his time in Poland.

== Loss of film copies ==
All copies of this film were destroyed during the Soviet occupation of Poland after World War II.

== Cast ==
- Barbara Orwid - as Lili
- Jana Krysta - as Zofia
- Jerzy Kobusz - as Bond
- Janusz Halny - as Woyda
- Stefan Szwarc
- Andrzej Karewicz
- Barbara Ludwiżanka
- Zygmunt Biesiadecki
