= Leonard Buczkowski =

Polish film director

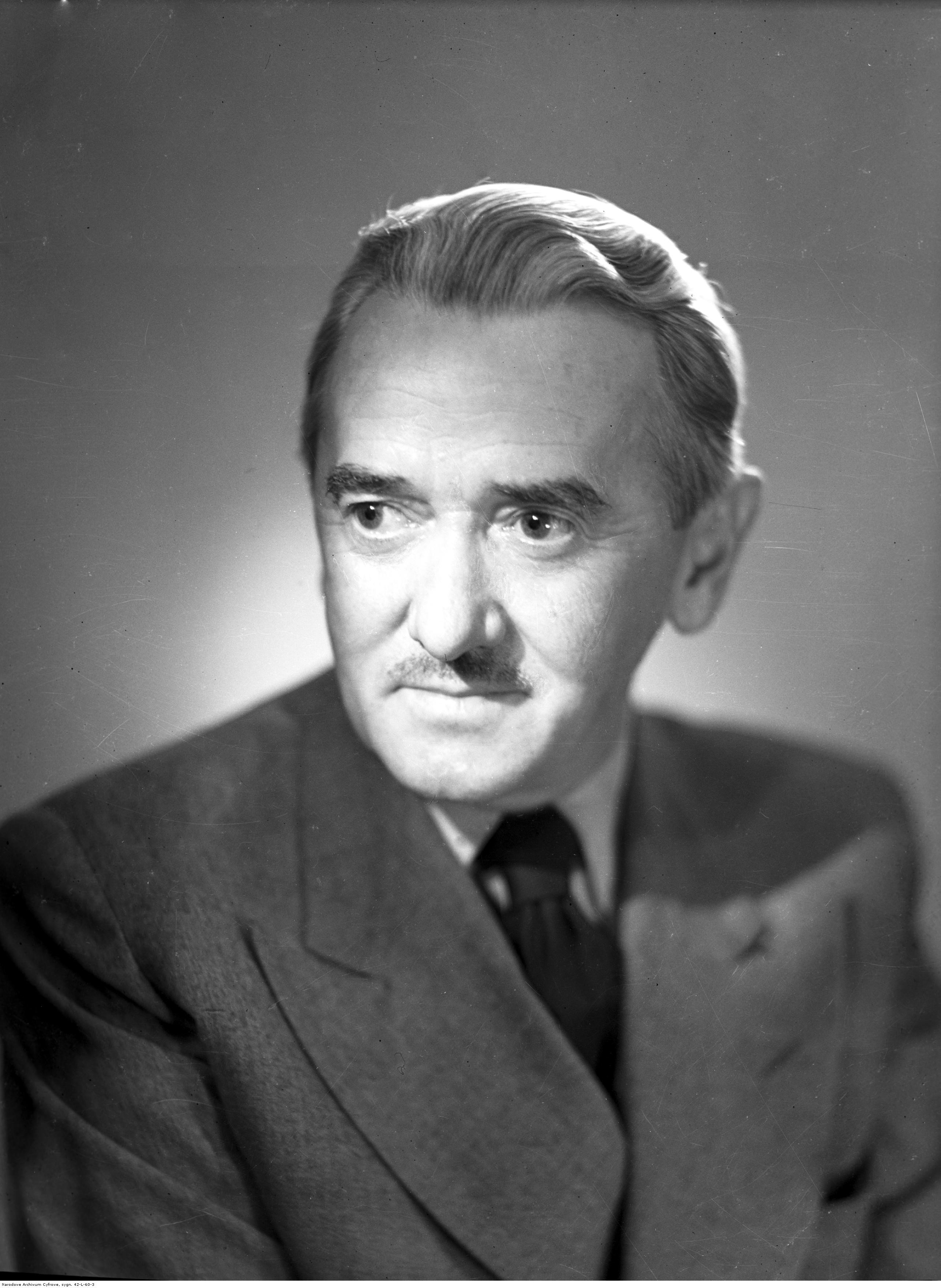
- Born: 5 August 1900; Warsaw, Congress Poland, Russian Empire
- Died: 19 February 1967 (aged 66); Warsaw, Poland
- Occupations: Film director Screenwriter
- Years active: 1928-1966

Leonard Buczkowski (5 August 1900 – 19 February 1967) was a Polish film director and screenwriter. He directed 23 films between 1928 and 1966. His 1959 film The Eagle was entered into the 1st Moscow International Film Festival.

== Selected filmography ==
- Daredevils (Szaleńcy, 1928)
- Gwiaździsta eskadra (1930)
- Rapsodia Bałtyku (1935)
- Wierna rzeka (1936)
- The Haunted Manor (1936)
- Forbidden Songs (1946)
- Sprawa pilota Maresza (1956)
- The Eagle (1959)
