= Zofia Dwornik =

Polish film editor (1922–2002)

- Born: 23 September 1922; Żurawica
- Died: 3 August 2002 (aged 79); Łódź
- Citizenship: Polish
- Education: Łódź Film School
- Occupation: Film editor

Zofia Dwornik (23 September 1922 – 3 August 2002) was a film editor.

== Biography ==
Daughter of Stefan Dwornik, lawyer, retired Polish Army infantry major, who was killed in the Katyn massacre.

== Filmography ==
- Pod gwiazdą frygijską (1954)
- Zaczarowany rower (1955)
- Sprawa pilota Maresza (1955)
- Noose (1957)
- Farewells (1958)
- Wspólny pokój (1959)
- Rozstanie (1960)
- Marysia i krasnoludki (1960)
- Złoto (1961)
- How to Be Loved (1962)
- Passenger (1963)
- Sobótki (1965)
- The Codes (1966)
- Niewiarygodne przygody Marka Piegusa (1966)
- Przeraźliwe łoże (1967)
- Zbrodnia lorda Artura Savile’a (1967)
- Stajnia na Salvatorze (1967)
- Klub szachistów (1967; TV film)
- The Doll (1968)
- The Structure of Crystal (1969)
- Zapalniczka (1970; TV film)
- Samochodzik i templariusze (1971; TV series)
- Na wylot (1972)
- Obcy w lesie (1971)
- Skrzydła (1972; TV film)
- Profesor na drodze (1973; TV film)
- Brzydkie kaczątko (1973; TV film)
- The Promised Land (1974)
- Dagny (1976)
- Ognie są jeszcze żywe (1976)
- Zielone – minione... (1976)
- Rekolekcje (1977)
- Rebus (1977)

Source.

== Bibliography ==
- Kwiatkowska, Paulina (2020). "Zofia Dwornik: Becoming a Female Film Editor". Panoptikum. 23: 63–76. Archived from the original on 30 July 2026.
