= Tadeusz Janczar =

Polish actor

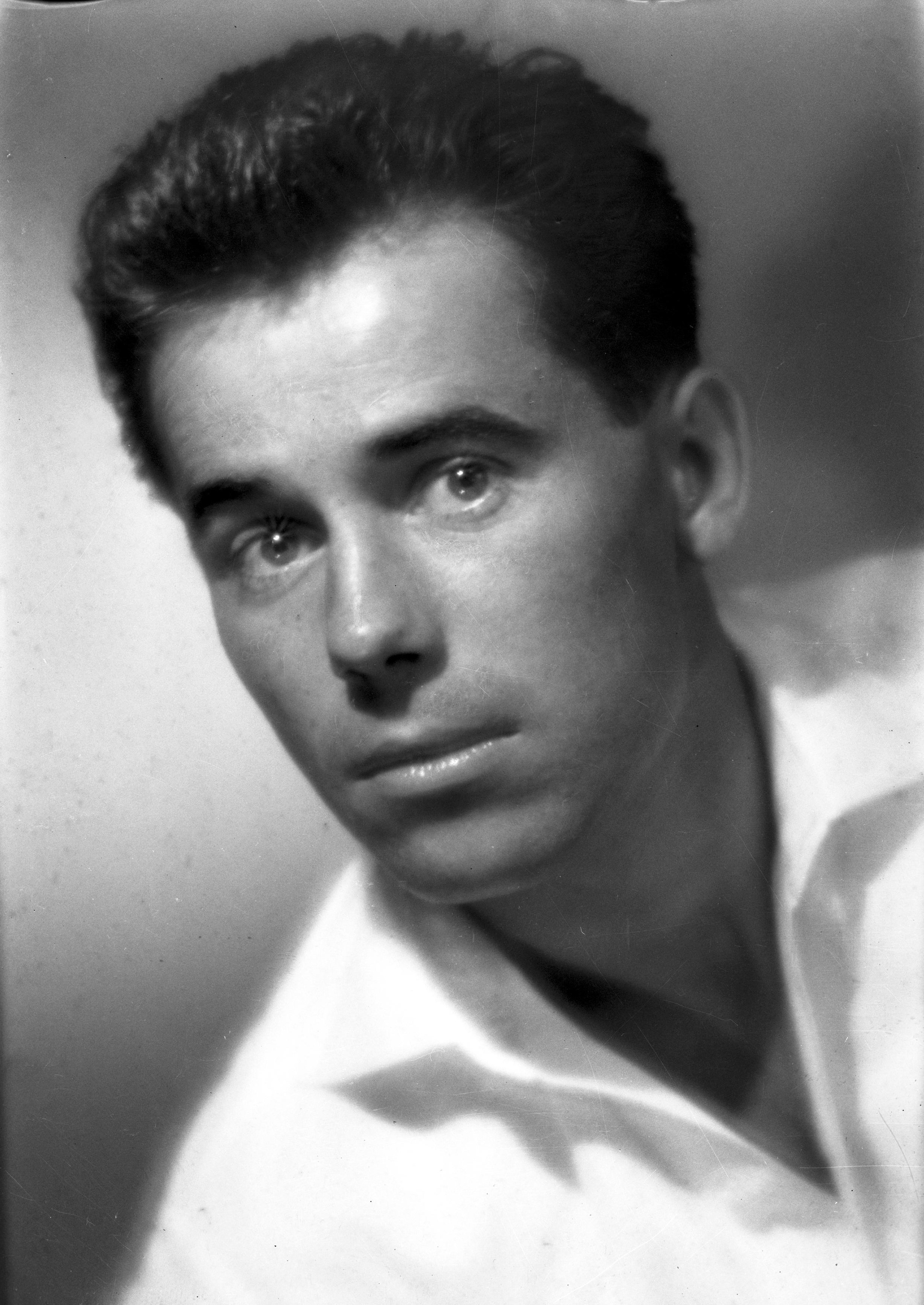
- Tadeusz Łomnicki
- Born: 25 April 1926; Warsaw, Poland
- Died: 31 October 1997 (aged 71); Warsaw, Poland
- Occupation: Actor
- Years active: 1952-1983

Tadeusz Janczar (Polish pronunciation: [taˈdɛ.uʂ ˈjant͡ʂar]; 25 April 1926 – 31 October 1997) was a Polish film actor. He appeared in 26 films between 1952 and 1983.

== Partial filmography ==
- Zaloga (1952) - Brzozowski
- Zolnierz zwyciestwa (1953) - Franek
- Five Boys from Barska Street (1954) - Kazek Spokorny
- A Generation (1955) - Jasio Krone
- Kariera (1955) - Witek
- Kanał (1957) - Ens. Jacek 'Korab'
- Farewells (1958) - Pawel
- Bad Luck (1960) - Ens. Sawicki
- Nafta (1961)
- Jutro premiera (1962) - profesor Roman Witting scenograf
- Dziewczyna z dobrego domu (1962) - Tadeusz Lokietek
- Landscape After the Battle (1970) - Karol
- Znaki na drodze (1970) - Michal Biel
- Prawdzie w oczy (1970) - Bronek Kaczmarski
- Zabijcie czarna owce (1972) - Tymon's Stepfather
- Na krawedzi (1973) - Wojtek
- Z tamtej strony teczy (1973) - Malarz, byly partner Teresy
- Hubal (1973) - Capt. Maciej 'Kotwicz' Kalenkiewicz
- Nie bede cie kochac (1974)
- Opowiesc w czerwieni (1974) - Cpt. Paszkowski
- Romans Teresy Hennert (1978) - Professor Laterna
- Zamach stanu (1980) - Wojciech Korfanty
- Nic nie stoi na przeszkodzie (1981) - Jerzy
- W obronie wlasnej (1982) - Jerzy
- Epitafium dla Barbary Radziwiłłówny (1983) - Samuel Maciejowski
