= Goodbye to the Past =

- Directed by: Wojciech Jerzy Has
- Written by: Jadwiga Żylińska
- Starring: Lidia Wysocka; Władysław Kowalski; Gustaw Holoubek
- Cinematography: Stefan Matyjaszkiewicz
- Edited by: Zofia Dwornik
- Music by: Lucjan Kaszycki
- Release date: 23 March 1961
- Running time: 72 minutes
- Country: Poland
- Language: Polish

Goodbye to the Past (Polish: Rozstanie, literally Partings) is a 1961 Polish psychological melodrama film directed by Wojciech Has.

== Cast ==
- Lidia Wysocka – Magdalena
- Władysław Kowalski − Olek Nowak
- Gustaw Holoubek − Oskar cRennert
- Irena Netto − Wiktoria Budkowa, the housemaid
- Adam Pawlikowski − Żbik, countess' son
- Danuta Krawczyńska – Iwona
- Maria Gella – countess
- Bogumił Kobiela − waiter
- Zbigniew Cybulski – famous actor (cameo appearance)

== Reception ==
The film received positive critical response in Poland.
