= Zaczarowany rower =

1955 Polish film

- Directed by: Silik Sternfeld
- Written by: Jerzy Suszko, Bohdan Tomaszewski
- Cinematography: Tadeusz Korecki
- Edited by: Zofia Dwornik
- Music by: Jerzy Harald
- Release date: 1955
- Running time: 71 minutes
- Country: Poland
- Language: Polish

Zaczarowany rower is a 1955 film directed by Silik Sternfeld, written by Jerzy Suszko and Bohdan Tomaszewski.

== Cast ==
- Józef Nalberczak as Stanisław Popiel
- Teodor Gendera as Zenon Wzorkiewicz
- Bernard Michalski as Albin Wzorkiewicz
- Włodzimierz Skoczylas as Józef Łazowski "Łajza"
- Ignacy Gogolewski as Mieczysław Duchowicz
- Wincenty Grabarczyk as Jan Strzałka
- Julian Jabczyński as Harandy
- Bolesław Płotnicki as Mączyński
- Aleksander Sewruk as Wanicki
- Stanisław Libner as mechanic
- Roman Polański as Adaś

Source.
