= Stanisław Dygat =

Polish writer (1914–1978)

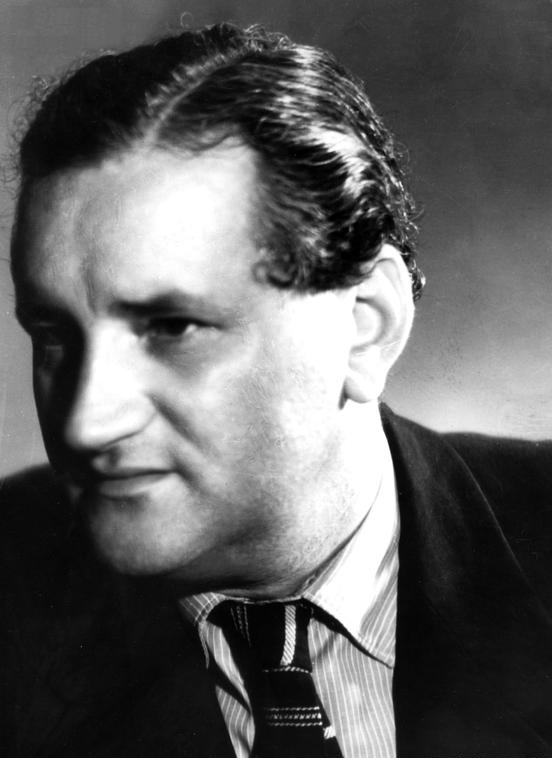
- Born: 5 December 1914; Warsaw, Congress Poland
- Died: 29 January 1978 (aged 63); Warsaw, Polish People's Republic
- Style: Fiction
- Political party: Polish United Workers' Party
- Awards: Order of Polonia Restituta, Cross of Merit

Stanisław Ludwik Dygat (Polish pronunciation: [staˈɲi.swaf ˈdɨ.ɡat]; 5 December 1914, Warsaw – 29 January 1978, Warsaw) was a Polish writer. His most famous novel, "Jezioro Bodeńskie" ("Lake Constance"), was written during World War II and published in 1946. All of his works are partly autobiographical (ex. because of his French origin, he was an internee in Constance in 1939).

== Biography ==
He was the grandson of Ludwik Dygat, an insurgent from 1863, and the son of architect Antoni Dygat. He graduated from Mikołaj Rej High School. He studied architecture and philosophy.

He collaborated with the magazines: "Kuźnica", "Twórczość" and "Przegląd Kulturalny". He made his debut in 1946 with the novel Jezioro Bodeńskie, which is an autobiographical inspiration (in 1939, Dygat was interned in a camp for foreigners on Lake Constance due to his French citizenship), and which is a kind of settling of accounts with pre-war Poland. This novel was adapted for the screen in 1986 by Janusz Zaorski. Another novel by Dygat was also filmed, the subject of which is the political transformation in post-war Poland - Pożegnania (Farewells, 1958, directed by Wojciech Jerzy Has), published in 1948. In 1967, Janusz Morgenstern directed the film Jowita, an adaptation of Dygat's novel Disneyland.

He was the literary director at the Wybrzeże Theatre in Gdańsk.

He was involved in translation work, translating into Polish, among others, Twelfth Night (1951) by William Shakespeare and Oedipus Rex by Sophocles.

He was a member of the Polish United Workers' Party, from which he resigned in November 1957 in protest against the authorities' refusal to allow the publication of the monthly "Europa". In January 1976, he was one of the signatories of Memorial 101, addressed to the Sejm Commission against planned changes to the constitution.

Since 2009, one of the parks in Warsaw's Mokotów district has been named after Stanisław Dygat (Park Stanisława Dygata w Warszawie). One of the streets in Warsaw's Żoliborz district and one in Malbork also bear Dygat's name.

== Selected novels ==
- 1946 - Jezioro Bodeńskie (Lake Constance, in 1986 a film based on the book was released - director: Janusz Zaorski),
- 1948 – Pożegnania (Farewells, in 1958 a film based on the book was released - director: Wojciech Jerzy Has),
- 1958 – Podróż ("Journey"),
- 1965 – Disneyland
- 1973 – Dworzec w Monachium ("Railway station in Munich").
