= Bohdan Tomaszewski =

Polish tennis player

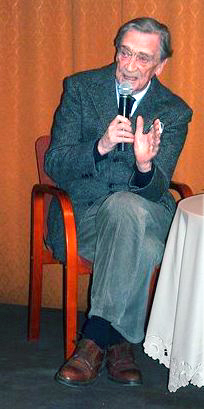
Bohdan Tomaszewski

Bohdan Tomaszewski (10 August 1921 – 27 February 2015) was a Polish sports journalist, tennis player, sports commentator, author of sports books and screenwriter. Called a "legend of Polish sports journalism", he was a member of the Polish Writers Association, and, with his son Tomasz, worked for the television station Polsat Sport.

Tomaszewski attended Warsaw's Stanisław Staszic High School, and began playing tennis in 1936 in Legia Warszawa. He participated in the Warsaw Uprising, as a soldier of the Home Army (nom de guerre “Mały”). After the war, he worked in the Grand Hotel in Sopot, then moved to Szczecin, where he worked as a journalist in a local daily, also playing lawn tennis in a team SKT Szczecin. Later on, Tomaszewski began working for Express Wieczorny, and then moved to TV and radio. His radio debut took place in early May 1947, when he commented the Davis Cup match Poland – Great Britain in Warsaw.

Between 1956 and 1980, he commented on twelve Olympic Games, both summer and winter. During the Martial law in Poland, Tomaszewski refused to cooperate with the regime-sponsored Polish Radio, and did not return to mass-media until 1989. Furthermore, in 1968 he founded a tennis tournament “Bohdan Tomaszewski Cup“. He died at the age of 93 in 2015.

== Filmography ==
As screenwriter.

- Zaczarowany rower (1955)
- Bokser (1966)
- Czekam w Monte-Carlo (1969)

Source.

== Awards ==
- Laurels of Polish Journalists Association for professionalism (2006)
- Diamond Microphone – the most prestigious award of the Polish Radio (1996)
- Polish TV award “Super Wiktor” (1994)
- Champion of the Polish Language (Mistrz Mowy Polskiej – 2001)
