= Escape from the Shadows (film) =

- Directed by: Jiří Sequens
- Written by: Bedrich Kubala; Jiří Sequens
- Starring: František Smolík
- Cinematography: Alois Jirácek
- Release date: 6 March 1959
- Running time: 97 minutes
- Country: Czechoslovakia
- Language: Czech

Escape from the Shadows (Czech: Útek ze stínu) is a 1959 Czech drama film directed by Jiří Sequens. It was entered into the 1st Moscow International Film Festival where it won a Golden Medal.

== Cast ==
- František Smolík
- Lída Vendlová
- Stanislav Remunda
- Josef Bek
- Renata Olarova
- Milena Asmanová
- Jaroslava Adamová as Irena
- Bohus Smutný
- Ruzena Lysenková
- Oldrich Vykypel
- Josef Kemr
