= Zygmunt Biesiadecki =

Polish actor

- Born: Zygmunt Tadeusz Biesiadecki; 26 October 1894; Kraków, Congress Poland
- Died: January 1944 (aged 49); Warsaw, German-occupied Poland
- Occupations: Actor and director
- Years active: 1912–1939

Zygmunt Tadeusz Biesiadecki (26 October 1894 – January 1944) was a Polish actor and director. He was active in theatre and film between 1912 and 1939. A resistance member during the Second World War, he and his wife were arrested by German troops and shot in a street execution in January 1944.

== Selected filmography ==
- Gwiaździsta eskadra (1930)
- Znachor (1937)
