= The Two Who Stole the Moon =

- Directed by: Jan Batory
- Written by: Jan Batory; Jan Brzechwa
- Based on: O dwóch takich, co ukradli księżyc by Kornel Makuszyński
- Starring: Lech Kaczyński; Jarosław Kaczyński
- Cinematography: Bogusław Lambach
- Edited by: Krystyna Batory
- Music by: Adam Walaciński
- Production company: Zespół Filmowy „Syrena”
- Distributed by: Centrala Wynajmu Filmów
- Release date: 12 October 1962
- Running time: 80 minutes
- Country: Poland
- Language: Polish

The Two Who Stole the Moon (Polish: O dwóch takich, co ukradli księżyc) is a 1962 Polish children's film based on Kornel Makuszyński's 1928 story of the same name.

Despite having been known to Polish children for multiple generations, the film gained renewed fame in the 2000s for starring two of the country's future leaders: Lech Kaczyński, who served as President of Poland from 2005 until his death in a 2010 plane crash, and his identical twin brother Jarosław Kaczyński, the Prime Minister of Poland from 2006 to 2007, Chief of Office of the President of Poland from 1990 to 1991, and current chairman of the Law and Justice party. The twins were thirteen at the time.

== Plot ==
The two twins, Jacek and Placek, start out as cruel and lazy boys whose main interest is eating, eating anything, including chalk and a sponge in school. One day they have the idea of stealing the Moon; after all, it is made of gold.

"If we steal the moon, we would not have to work"
"But we do not work now, either..."
"But then we would not have to work at all".

After a few small adventures, they manage to steal the Moon. Immediately a gang of robbers notices the little thieves and captures them. The two regain their freedom, and one of the twins devises a plan to enter the "City of Gold". The plan works, but when the robbers try to collect the gold, they turn into gold themselves. The twins escape and then run home and promise to help their parents with their work as farmers.

An animated version of the film was also produced in 1984, with virtually the same plot.

The musical track from the 1984 animated film includes music by the popular Polish rock group Lady Pank. The film has been compared to the Beatles' involvement in Yellow Submarine, as they were both designed to boost said groups' popularity.

== Cast ==
- Lech Kaczyński - Jacek (voiced by Maria Janecka)
- Jarosław Kaczyński - Placek (voiced by Danuta Mancewicz)
- Ludwik Benoit - Wojciech, father of Jacek and Placek
- Helena Grossówna - mother of Jacek and Placek
- Janusz Strachocki - mayor of Zapiecek
- Tadeusz Woźniak - teacher in Zapiecek
- Janusz Kłosiński - Mortadella
- Wacław Kowalski - smith in Zapiecek
- Henryk Modrzewski - tailor of Zapiecek
- Bronisław Darski - Barnaba
- Stanisław Tylczyński - the courtier
- Marian Wojtczak - captain of Robbers
- Włodzimierz Skoczylas - Robber "Łapiduch"
- Tadeusz Schmidt - Robber "Krwawa Kiszka"
- Ryszard Ronczewski - Robber "Rozporek"
- Jadwiga Kuryluk - Julia Nieborak
- Marian Kociniak - Grzegorz Nieborak
- Andrzej Szczepkowski - Narrator (voice)
