= The Structure of Crystal =

- Directed by: Krzysztof Zanussi
- Written by: Krzysztof Zanussi; Edward Żebrowski
- Cinematography: Stefan Matyjaszkiewicz
- Edited by: Zofia Dwornik
- Music by: Wojciech Kilar
- Release date: 1969
- Running time: 74 min.
- Country: Poland
- Language: Polish

The Structure of Crystal (Polish: Struktura kryształu) is a 1969 Polish film directed by Krzysztof Zanussi. It is his debut feature, and it won the Mermaid Award at the Warsaw Film Festival.

== Plot ==
Jan and Marek were once physicist colleagues, but Jan left academia and became a meteorologist in a small rural town. Marek, who remained a scientist in the city, visits Jan and entreats him to return to scientific research and urban living. A spirited conversation ensues about values and ways of living.

== Cast ==
- Barbara Wrzesińsk − Anna
- Andrzej Żarnecki − Marek
- Jan Mysłowicz − Jan
- Władysław Jarema
- Adam Dębski
- Daniel Olbrychski
