= Znaki na drodze =

1970 Polish film

- Directed by: Andrzej Piotrowski
- Written by: Andrzej Piotrowski; Andrzej Twerdochlib
- Starring: Tadeusz Janczar
- Edited by: Krzysztof Osiecki
- Release date: 2 June 1970
- Running time: 97 minutes
- Country: Poland
- Language: Polish

Znaki na drodze is a 1970 Polish drama film directed by Andrzej Piotrowski. The film won the Golden Leopard at the Locarno International Film Festival.

== Cast ==
- Tadeusz Janczar as Michal Biel
- Galina Polskikh as Jadwiga
- Leon Niemczyk as Paslawski
- Leszek Drogosz as Stefan Jaksonek
- Bolesław Abart as Driver Sosin
- Arkadiusz Bazak as Marian
- Ewa Ciepiela as Helena
- Janusz Kłosiński as Mechanic Franciszek Wasko
- Ryszard Kotys as Mechanic Bulaga
- Zygmunt Malanowicz as Lieutenant
- Jan Peszek as Driver Bakalarzewicz
- Jerzy Block as Porter Kurek
