= The Verdict (1959 film) =

1959 film

- Directed by: Jean Valère
- Written by: Robert Hossein; Marcel Moussy; Jean Valère
- Produced by: Christine Gouze-Rénal
- Starring: Marina Vlady
- Cinematography: Henri Decaë
- Edited by: Léonide Azar
- Music by: Daniel Lesur
- Release date: 2 October 1959
- Running time: 79 minutes
- Country: France
- Language: French

The Verdict (French: La Sentence) is a 1959 French drama film directed by Jean Valère. It was entered into the 1st Moscow International Film Festival.

== Cast ==
- Marina Vlady as Catherine Desroches
- Robert Hossein as Georges Lagrange
- Roger Hanin as Antoine Castellani
- Lucien Raimbourg as François Lombard
- Béatrice Bretty as Jeanne Boissard
- Hans Verner as Le commandant SS (uncredited)
