= Tadeusz Puszczyński =

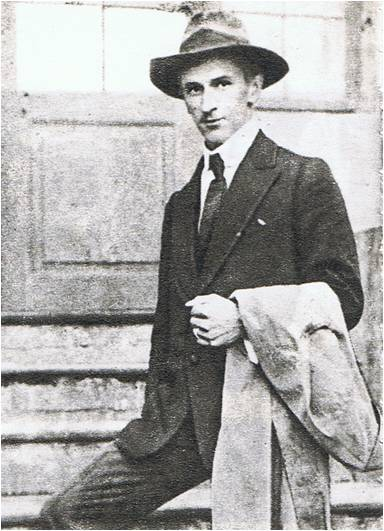
Tadeusz Puszczyński

Tadeusz Puszczyński (nom de guerre: "Konrad Wawelberg"; February 2, 1895 in Piotrków Trybunalski – February 24, 1939 in Warsaw) was a Polish military intelligence officer who commanded the Polish General Staff's Destruction Group during the Third Silesian Uprising.

== Biography ==
Tadeusz Puszczyński was born on February 2, 1895, in the village of Józinki near Piotrków Trybunalski in Congress Poland. He graduated from the same Piotrków secondary school as Stefan Rowecki and Zygmunt Zaremba, and was a member of the same boy-scout troop as Rowecki.

During World War I, Puszczyński served in Józef Piłsudski's Polish Legions, then participated in the Silesian Uprisings. In the Third Silesian Uprising, he commanded the Polish General Staff's Destruction Group (known, after his pseudonym, as the "Wawelberg Group"). The Wawelberg Group opened the uprising on May 2–3, 1921, by blowing up bridges linking Upper Silesia with the rest of Germany, thus thwarting immediate German measures to suppress the uprising.

In the 1920s Puszczyński joined Poland's Border Defence Corps, in 1936 becoming commandant of the Sarny garrison (see "Sarny Fortified Area").

Puszczyński died of cancer on February 24, 1939, in Warsaw and was interred at Powązki Cemetery. He was posthumously promoted to the rank of colonel.

== Awards ==
Puszczyński's contribution to the success of the Third Silesian Uprising was recognized with a Virtuti Militari (Poland's highest military decoration), 5th class, on June 27, 1922.

== See also ==
- Wawelberg Group
- History of Polish intelligence services
