= List of submissions to the 32nd Academy Awards for Best Foreign Language Film =

1959 Best Foreign Language Film submissions

Highlights
- Oscar winner: (France) Black Orpheus
- Submissions: 13
- Debuts: 4

This is a list of submissions to the 32nd Academy Awards for Best Foreign Language Film. The Academy Award for Best Foreign Language Film was created in 1956 by the Academy of Motion Picture Arts and Sciences to honour non-English-speaking films produced outside the United States. The award is handed out annually, and is accepted by the winning film's director, although it is considered an award for the submitting country as a whole. Countries are invited by the Academy to submit their best films for competition according to strict rules, with only one film being accepted from each country.

For the 32nd Academy Awards, thirteen films were submitted in the category Academy Award for Best Foreign Language Film. The Netherlands, Pakistan, Hong Kong and Singapore submitted films for the first time. The five nominated films came from Denmark, France, Italy, the Netherlands and West Germany.

France won for the fifth time with Black Orpheus by Marcel Camus. Even though the film was shot in Brazil, in Portuguese, and with a large Brazilian cast and crew, it was directed by a French filmmaker and produced by French companies, thus was deemed able to represent France.

== Submissions ==
| Submitting country | Film title used in nomination | Original title | Language(s) | Director(s) | Result |
|---|---|---|---|---|---|
| Denmark | Paw | | Danish | Astrid Henning-Jensen | Nominated |
| France | Black Orpheus | Orfeu Negro | Brazilian Portuguese | Marcel Camus | Won Academy Award |
| West Germany | The Bridge | Die Brücke | German, English | Bernhard Wicki | Nominated |
| Hong Kong | For Better, for Worse | 雨過天青 | Mandarin | Yueh Feng | Not nominated |
| India | The World of Apu | অপুর সংসার | Bengali | Satyajit Ray | Not nominated |
| Italy | The Great War | La grande guerra | Italian | Mario Monicelli | Nominated |
| Japan | Fires on the Plain | 野火 | Japanese | Kon Ichikawa | Not nominated |
| Mexico | Nazarín | | Spanish | Luis Buñuel | Not nominated |
| Netherlands | The Village on the River | Dorp aan de rivier | Dutch | Fons Rademakers | Nominated |
| Pakistan | The Day Shall Dawn | جاگو ہوا سویرا | Urdu, Bengali | A. J. Kardar | Not nominated |
| Singapore | The Kingdom and the Beauty | 江山美人 | Mandarin | Li Han-hsiang | Not nominated |
| United Arab Republic | The Nightingale's Prayer | دعاء الكروان | Egyptian Arabic | Henry Barakat | Not nominated |
| Yugoslavia | Train Without a Timetable | Vlak bez voznog reda | Serbo-Croatian | Veljko Bulajić | Not nominated |

== Sources ==
- Margaret Herrick Library, Academy of Motion Picture Arts and Sciences
