= Wawelberg Group =

Polish special-forces unit

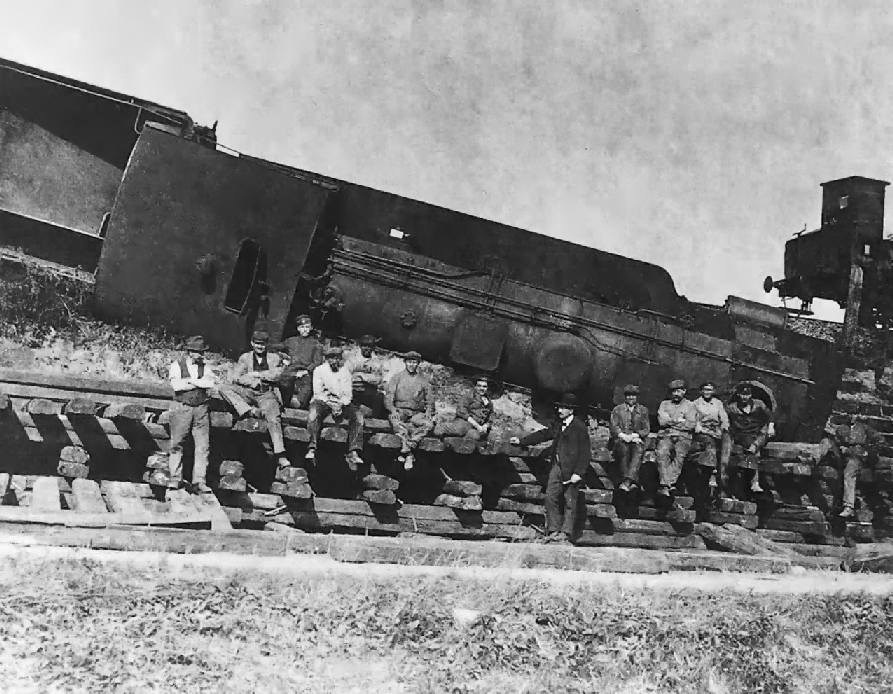
German train derailed by the Poles at Kędzierzyn-Koźle

The Wawelberg Group (Polish: Grupa Wawelberg), also known as the Konrad Wawelberg Destruction Group (Polish: Grupa Destrukcyjna Konrada Wawelberga), was a Polish special-forces unit. The group began the Third Silesian Uprising on May 2/3, 1921 by blowing up seven rail bridges linking Upper Silesia with the rest of Germany.

== Origins ==
The Wawelberg Group was organized by the Polish General Staff's Section II (Intelligence) as the "Destruction Office" in the waning days of 1920 (see History of Polish intelligence services) as rumors flew that the Inter-Allied Plebiscite Commission would grant almost all of Upper Silesia to Germany.

The Destruction Office took the "Wawelberg" name from the nom de guerre of its commander, Captain Tadeusz Puszczyński — "Konrad Wawelberg." Puszczyński was a graduate of the Warsaw Polytechnic and had served in the World War I Polish Legions and in the Polish Military Organization. He had also participated in the 1920 Second Silesian Uprising. His crucial task was to find the right people and carry out acts of sabotage (terror) in the rear of the German positions. All the men in the Wawelberg Group had to be skilled combat engineers with extensive knowledge of explosives.

== The Group ==
The Group's deputy commander was Lt. Edmund Charaszkiewicz. Puszczyński recruited, from among his soldiers, two officer cadets (podchorąży), the brothers Tadeusz and Janusz Meissner. All four men would later be decorated with the Virtuti Militari, 5th class, on June 27, 1922. Puszczyński divided his men into four teams — A, G, U and N. These designations came from the initial letters of the Polish phrase Akcja Główna Unieruchomienia Niemców ("Main Operation to Immobilize the Germans"). All the agents were armed, wore civilian clothes, and were provided with money.

The men of the Wawelberg Group knew that, to overcome German military superiority in the area, they had to cut the rail and telegraph links between Upper Silesia and Germany. Therefore, the teams were deployed about the western part of Upper Silesia, ready to attack. Team G, 13 men commanded by Lt. Włodzimierz Dąbrowski, was deployed near Gogolin and ordered to watch the rail line between Krapkowice and Prudnik. Team U, 10 men commanded by Lt. Edmund Charaszkiewicz, was deployed on the border between Głubczyce and Prudnik counties, to keep an eye on the rail lines Głogówek – Racławice Śląskie – Prudnik, and Głubczyce– Racławice Śląskie.

Puszczyński — "Wawelberg" — himself, with a small team (including former German Army sapper Wiktor Wiechaczek and miner and explosives expert Herman Jurzyca), deployed in the deep rear of the German positions, at the village of Szczepanowice (German: Sczepanowitz), some five kilometers west of Opole (since 1936, it is a district of Opole). Their task was to blow up the crucial 200-meter-long Oder River rail bridge.

== Operation "Bridges" ==
The Poles' plan, Akcja Mosty (Operation "Bridges"), was implemented on the night of May 2/3, 1921. Puszczyński and his men, equipped with some 320 kilograms of explosives, after initial difficulties managed to destroy a span of the Szczepanowice bridge. The other groups also succeeded in their objectives. Altogether the Poles managed to destroy seven rail bridges at such places as Szczepanowice, Kluczbork, Kędzierzyn-Koźle, Głogówek and Świętochłowice.

The blowing up of the bridges initiated the Third Silesian Uprising, the greatest and best-organized of the three. The Germans, taken by surprise, needed time to repair their severed communications and to transport their troops, and the Poles took advantage of the situation. All the major rail lines leading to Upper Silesia (such as the Wrocław – Opole – Katowice, and the Nysa – Kędzierzyn-Koźle) had been immobilized. Two German military rail transports had also been destroyed.

== Aftermath ==
After the operation, most of the Polish agents managed to withdraw to Sosnowiec, which due to its proximity to the border was the main base of Polish operations. The Germans captured an unknown number of the men who had blown up the bridge at the village of Dobra; they were imprisoned for a few weeks at Opole. Also caught, near Głubczyce, were two Poles who were trying to make their way to Czechoslovakia, but the Germans did not know their identity and released them.

The Germans announced, in the June 18, 1921 Amts-Blatt der Königlichen Regierung zu Oppeln (Official Gazette of the Opole District), a reward of 10,000 Reichsmarks for information about the perpetrators of the attacks.

== See also ==
- Upper Silesia plebiscite
- Tadeusz Puszczyński
- Edmund Charaszkiewicz
- Janusz Meissner
