= A. J. Kardar =

Pakistani film director (1926–2002)

Akhtar J. Kardar
- Born: 25 November 1926; Lahore, British India
- Died: 14 February 2002 (aged 75); London, England
- Occupation: Film director
- Years active: 1959-1969

Akhtar J. Kardar (25 November 1926 – 14 February 2002), popularly known by the initials AJ, was a Pakistani film director, producer and screenwriter. He was the brother of filmmaker Abdur Rashid Kardar and the cousin of international cricketer Abdul Hafeez Kardar.

He is credited in particular for having directed The Day Shall Dawn original title as Jago Hua Savera (1959), a film which has received international recognition and numerous awards. It was the first Pakistani film to be submitted for an Oscar in the Best Foreign Film Category.

== Biography ==
Akhtar J Kardar graduated from the Royal Naval Academy after serving through World War II as a Commissioned Officer. He served until 1945 after an attack on his ship the Ituara in the Gulf, where he was one of a few members to survive a torpedo hit. A few years later, he went on to work as a journalist and studied Art and Cinematography at the London School of Arts & Goldsmiths College.

In 1959 he started making films and has since written, produced and directed three feature films and 59 documentaries. His work has been exhibited in several international film festivals. Some of the awards his work has received include The Boston Film Festival Award (1961), The Moscow Gold Medal Award (1959), The Golden Dolphin Award from Iran and the Nigar Award from Pakistan (1969).

He was the managing director for seven years of one of Pakistan's premier documentary film production companies; National Film Studios Ltd and retained as consultant for 5 years by the National Film Development Corporation of Pakistan.

During 1982 and 1985, he served as a senior lecturer in "The Theory & Practice of Film Making" in the Yarmouk University (Jordan), where he received an honorary doctorate by the university.

== Selected filmography ==
- The Day Shall Dawn (1959)
- Qasam Us Waqat Ki (1969)

== See also ==
- List of submissions to the 32nd Academy Awards for Best Foreign Language Film
- List of Pakistani submissions for the Academy Award for Best Foreign Language Film
