= Szczepanowice =

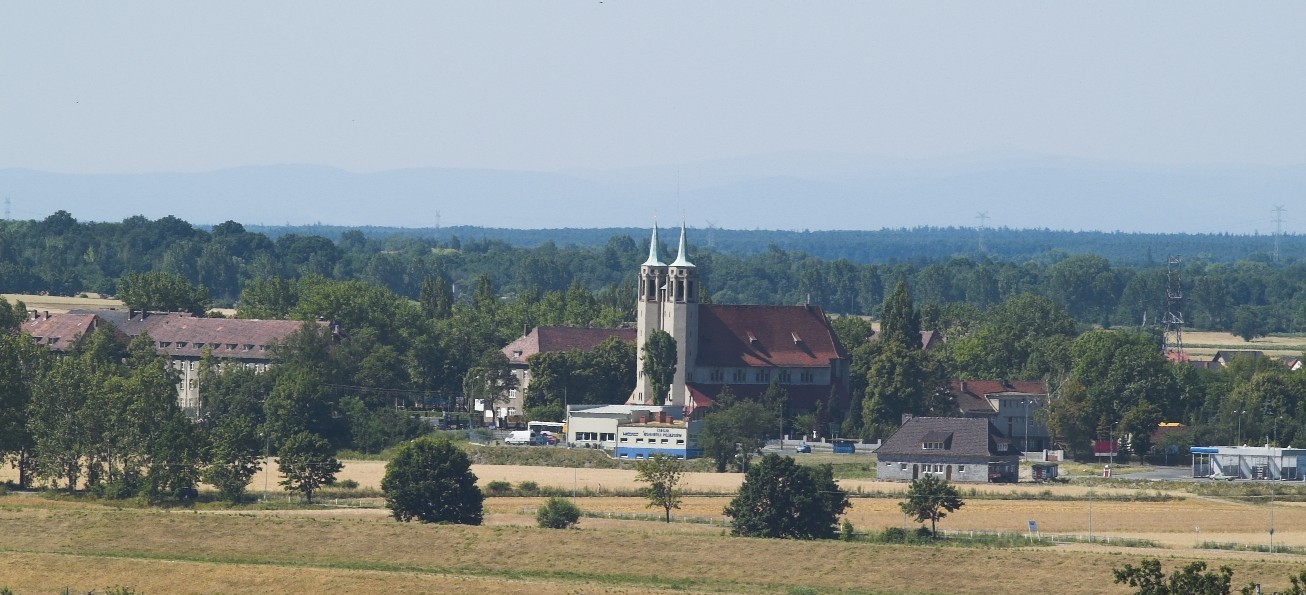
- Saint Joseph's Church in Szczepanowice

- Location within Poland
- Coordinates: 50°39′30″N 17°53′40″E
- Country: Poland
- Voivodeship: Opole
- County/City: Opole
- Within city limits: 1936
- Time zone: UTC+1 (CET)
  - Summer (DST): UTC+2 (CEST)
- Vehicle registration: OP

Szczepanowice (German: Sczepanowitz, Stefansfeld; since 1936, Stefanshöh) is a district of Opole, Poland.

== Etymology ==
The name comes from the Polish masculine given name Szczepan.

== History ==
Szczepanowice was first mentioned as a settlement in the first half of the 13th century – in 1254 as Sczepanowicz, and in 1278 as Sczepanowice.

At the opening of the Third Silesian Uprising (1921), the town's railroad bridge was one of seven that were blown up by the Wawelberg Group, a destruction unit run by Polish military intelligence (Section II).

Formerly a village, Szczepanowice was annexed to the city of Opole in 1936. It has some 3,200 residents and comprises mainly single-family dwellings. In addition there is a cluster of apartment houses on ulica Gospodarcza and of row houses on ulica Stawowa.

In 1997 Szczepanowice suffered a millennium flood of the Odra River.
