= The Eagle (1959 film) =

Orzeł
- Directed by: Leonard Buczkowski
- Written by: Leonard Buczkowski, Janusz Meissner
- Music by: Waldemar Kazanecki
- Production company: KADR
- Release date: 7 February 1959
- Running time: 103 minutes
- Country: Poland
- Language: Polish

The Eagle (Polish: Orzeł) is a 1959 Polish war film directed by Leonard Buczkowski. It is based on the true story of the Polish World War II submarine ORP Orzeł. Since the real Orzeł was sunk in the war, to assure authenticity her role was played by her sister ship, the ORP Sęp. The film was entered into the 1st Moscow International Film Festival.

The story is inspired by the Orzeł incident, when Orzeł entered, in September 1939, the harbour of neutral Estonia and left its commanding officer with symptoms of illness. The Estonian authorities tried to intern the submarine, under pressure from Germany and the Soviet Union, but it escaped.

== Cast ==
- Aleksander Sewruk as Commander Henryk Kłoczkowski
- Wieńczysław Gliński as Captain Jan Grabiński
- Jan Machulski as Lieutenant Pilecki
- Roland Głowacki as Lieutenant Roland
- Bronisław Pawlik as Mate Rokosz
- Andrzej Harder as Ensing Morawski
- Zbigniew Filus as Bossman Wacał Pierzchała
- Henryk Bąk as Bossman Leon Wiktorczyk
- Ignacy Machowski as Bossman Marita
- Czesław Piaskowski as Bossman Serafin

== See also ==
- Cinema of Poland
- List of Polish language films
- Submarine films
