= Helena Grossówna =

Polish actress and dancer (1904–1994)

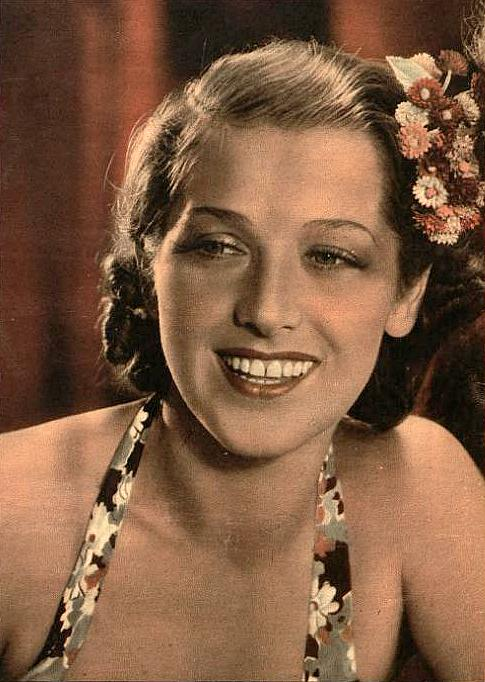
- Helena Grossówna (pre-1939)
- Born: 25 November 1904; Thorn, German Empire
- Died: 1 July 1994 (aged 89); Warsaw, Poland
- Occupation: Actress
- Years active: 1926–1967
- Spouse(s): Jan Gierszał, Tadeusz Cieśliński

Helena Grossówna (25 November 1904 – 1 July 1994) was a Polish actress and dancer, who starred in several popular Polish films during the interwar period.

== Early life ==
She was the daughter of Leonard Gross, a German, and Valeria Winiawska, a Pole. Her father was a butcher and her mother, having lost her husband, had to raise her four children alone, including Helena.

== Career ==
Helena Grossówna is believed to have begun her career as an extra in the operetta The Csárdás Princess, directed by Witold Zdzitowiecki, which premiered at the Municipal Theater in Toruń on December 6, 1924. However, Grossówna herself mentioned that she debuted as a dancer in 1924 in Toruń, performing in A Midsummer Night’s Dream, directed by Stanisława Wysocka.

In 1926, Grossówna completed her studies at the ballet school associated with the Municipal Theater, where she performed for the next two seasons. In 1928, she moved to Paris to continue her ballet training under Russian ballerinas of Polish descent Matylda Krzesińska and Bronisława Niżyńska. That same year, she married Jan Gierszał, a businessman and art patron, and they settled in a property near Paris previously owned by Pola Negri, the Hollywood star of Polish origin.

Grossówna made cinematic history by speaking the first words in Polish ever officially recorded on a sound film, during the production of the Polish version of The Doctor's Secret in June 1930. Filmed at a studio near Paris by the American studio Paramount, this film featured actors such as Zbigniew Sawan and Maria Gorczyńska, with Grossówna playing a small role.

After returning to Poland in 1931, Grossówna became a prima ballerina at the Teatr Wielki in Poznań and later worked as a choreographer in Bydgoszcz. In 1935, she starred in the operetta Jacht miłości at the New Theatre in Poznań. That same year, she moved to Warsaw, performing in cabarets like "Cyrulik Warszawski" and "Małe Qui pro quo". Between 1935 and 1939, Grossówna appeared in seventeen films, becoming a significant figure in Polish cinema. Her notable roles include Piętro wyżej (1937), where she played the love interest of Eugeniusz Bodo, and Paweł i Gaweł (1938), where she sang the lullaby "Ach, śpij kochanie" with Adolf Dymsza. In Zapomniana melodia (1938), she was serenaded by Aleksander Żabczyński with the famous song "Już nie zapomnisz mnie."

Grossówna was one of the most popular stars of pre-war Polish cinema, forming a memorable trio on screen with Bodo and Dymsza. Her appeal extended beyond the screen; she won a poll for the most beautiful smile in Warsaw, organized by Gazeta Codzienna. Pre-war press often described her as embodying "a Venus type, increasingly rare, with perfect oval features, fair complexion, and dreamy, tender eyes," attributes that captivated audiences. She bought a house with a garden in Międzylesie. In autumn, she was to appear in a film adaptation of Zakrzewski's novel Crazy Julka, and in January 1940 she was to travel to the USA to perform. This was combined with her winning a plebiscite by the American Polish community, which chose Grossówna as the queen of the screen. The outbreak of the Second World War thwarted these plans.

== Activities during World War II ==
She worked as a waitress during the German occupation of Poland, and at the same time, she served as an officer (lieutenant) in the Polish underground. During the Warsaw Uprising of 1944, she was in command of a women's section of the battalion "Sokół" (Eng. falcon), for which she was highly decorated. After the defeat of the uprising, she was deported to the Gross-Lübars prisoner of war camp near Magdeburg, then to the Stalag VI-C in Oberlangen. Here, on April 12, 1945, she was liberated by the Polish 1st Armoured Division. She returned to Poland and in 1948 where she joined the Warsaw theatre "Syrena". In 1964 she retired.

== Selected filmography ==
- Kochaj tylko mnie (1935)
- The Haunted Manor (1936)
- Dodek na froncie (1936)
- Piętro wyżej (1937)
- A Diplomatic Wife (1937)
- Florian (1938)
- Paweł i Gaweł (1938)
- Szczęśliwa trzynastka (1938)
- Zapomniana melodia (1938)
- Królowa przedmieścia (1938)
- Robert and Bertram (1938)
- The Vagabonds (1939)
- The Two Who Stole the Moon (1962)

In 2013 the Polish Post issued a commemorative stamp of her, with Adolf Dymsza and Mieczysława Ćwiklińska.
