= Zapomniana melodia =

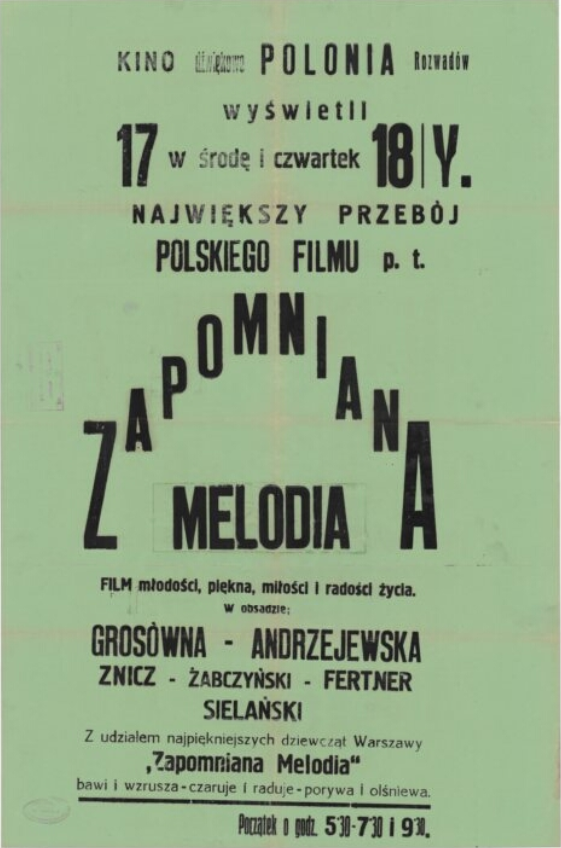
- Directed by: Konrad Tom; Jan Fethke
- Written by: Jan Fethke; Napoleon Sądek; Ludwik Starski
- Produced by: Jan Breit (production manager)
- Starring: Helena Grossówna; Aleksander Żabczyński; Antoni Fertner
- Cinematography: Jerzy Sten
- Edited by: Jerzy Sten
- Music by: Henryk Wars
- Release date: November 25, 1938 (Poland)
- Running time: 87 minutes
- Country: Poland
- Language: Polish

Zapomniana melodia (Forgotten melody) is a Polish musical comedy from 1938 directed by Konrad Tom and Jan Fethke, featuring three well-known songs by Ludwik Starski with music by Henryk Wars: Ach, jak przyjemnie! and Już nie zapomnisz mnie, along with an elaborate arrangement of the song Frère Jacques. The film's protagonists are the lovers, boarding school student Helenka Roliczówna (Helena Grossówna) and Stefan Frankiewicz (Aleksander Żabczyński). The young man sings the titular "forgotten melody" (Już nie zapomnisz mnie), but when a series of misunderstandings arise between the couple, their feelings fade and they forget the lyrics of the song. However, they happily come to an understanding, Stefan remembers the song's lyrics, and the lovers live happily ever after. Helenka's father, Bogusław Rolicz (Antoni Fertner) – the president of a cosmetics company – uses the "forgotten melody" to remember the recipe for his invention and protect it from theft by a competitor in the industry, Roxy.

Zapomniana melodia was a box office success, and its accompanying songs became hits. Interwar critics had mixed opinions about the film; while most viewed the production positively, there were also very negative reviews in the trade press. In later years, film scholars and historians praised the production. Jerzy Toeplitz wrote that it was "the only successful cultural musical comedy in the entire pre-war Polish film industry (...) ", which "had a well-constructed plot, humor, and charm".

== Plot ==
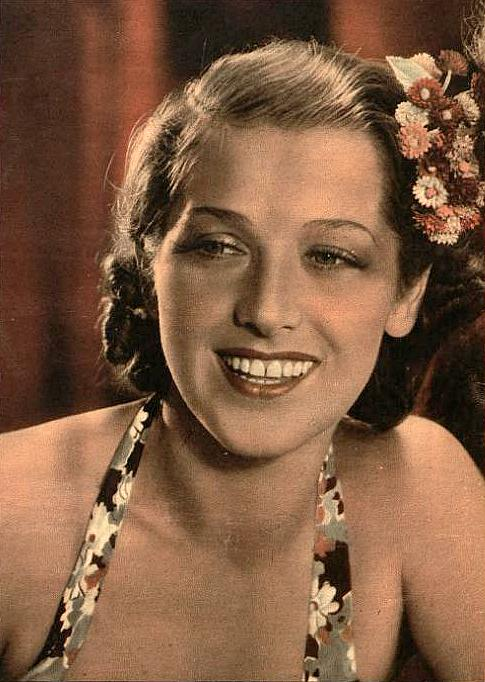
Helena Grossówna, playing the role of Helenka Rolicz

Helenka Roliczówna, the daughter of a wealthy entrepreneur in the cosmetics industry, is a boarder at the Institute for the Education of Girls near Warsaw. Along with her friend, Jadzia Pietrusińska, they lead the class in pranks on their conservative singing teacher, Professor Frankiewicz, who forces them to practice singing the song Frère Jacques until they drop. A series of misunderstandings unfold when Stefan Frankiewicz, the professor's nephew, arrives by motorboat from Warsaw. He engages in a conversation with Helenka on the river after colliding with her kayak while she was paddling back to the dock after physical education class. During the next music class, the girls once again play a prank on their teacher by directing a love letter to him. After reading the message about the urgent need for a meeting, the irritated professor throws the note out the window directly into Stefan's hands, who was waiting at the school gate. Seeing Helenka's figure in the window, frightened by the incident, Stefan assumes the letter is addressed to him. During the break, Roliczówna and Pietrusińska unsuccessfully try to talk to Stefan and resolve the misunderstanding but are chased away by Frankiewicz. He recognizes his nephew and scares him off from the school gate, fearing a repetition of his past antics.

At the same time, Bogusław Rolicz, in the final stages of preparing to present his latest incredible achievement to the supervisory board – chocolate-flavored soap that bounces like a ball after being wetted – fears that his competitor, Mr. Roxy, will steal the recipe and take all the profits. At the urging of his secretary, he decides to memorize the formula because no one can steal it from his mind. As the president of the board of trustees of the institute, he visits the school and observes his daughter's progress. In the evening, Helenka meets Stefan at the dock, according to the information conveyed in the letter, to clarify the misunderstanding. During a playful argument, the man falls into the water, pretending to drown. The frightened boarding students rush to his rescue and carry him to the institute. Professor Frankiewicz expresses outrage at the repeated encounter with his nephew, insisting that he deny any relationship and leave the school as soon as possible. The situation takes an unexpected turn. To avoid embarrassing his relative, Stefan tells everyone that his name is Stefan Roxy (he read the name on a bottle of cologne). Soon after, the school principal proudly announces the courage of the students to President Rolicz. In light of this event, the industrialist intends to fund a winter swimming pool for the school. The school principal reveals the joyful news to the music teacher, then scolds him upon learning that he expelled the boy from school. Professor Frankiewicz encourages Stefan to return. A deeper love develops between Helenka and Stefan.

President Rolicz struggles to memorize the recipe, but his prolonged efforts yield no results. At one point, Helenka plays the song Stefan sang for her, prompting the industrialist to come up with the formula words set to a catchy melody and begin making progress in memorization. Meanwhile, dancer Lili Fontelli, whom Stefan showered with expensive gifts and confessed his love to, begins searching for her beloved at the institute. Giving only his name to the coachman, she arouses suspicion among the educators that Professor Frankiewicz is the admirer of the nightclub star. In the evening, the music teacher goes to the Imperial club where the dancer performs to clarify the situation. At the same club, Helenka, accidentally taking Stefan's coat, has a discreet meeting with him, while unaware, her father goes there for a meeting with his partners.

Professor Frankiewicz explains the recent mistake to Lili Fontelli, then, unaccustomed to alcohol, at her urging, he drinks a cocktail, which suddenly worsens his health. Shortly afterward, the dancer notices Stefan and warmly greets him. After their date, Helenka realizes she left her coat behind and returns to the Imperial to retrieve it. Mistakenly interpreting Stefan and Lili's affection as genuine, she rejects the boy's love. President Rolicz witnesses the inappropriate behavior of the professor and is shocked by his daughter's presence with a stranger at the dance hall, and to top it off, his secretary convinces him that Stefan is the son of a competitor in the industry. The angry president expels Helenka from the institute and renounces his patronage of the institution. Professor Frankiewicz resigns from his position as a teacher. Despite further misunderstandings, Zapomniana melodia ultimately leads to a happy ending. During a board meeting, Rolicz forgets the memorized formula, and an anxious Helenka fails to remember Stefan's song, so she must – not without joy – restore him to favor. Stefan sings the "forgotten melody", the president remembers the formula, and happily accepts his daughter's love for her former enemy. Learning about the dismissal of the music teacher, the boarding students take successful action to save his position at the school. In the final scene, all the characters paddle kayaks, singing Ach, jak przyjemnie! joyfully.

== Cast ==
The information provided is a cast list for the film Zapomniana melodia:

- Helena Grossówna as Helenka Rolicz, daughter of President Rolicz
- Aleksander Żabczyński as Stefan Frankiewicz
- Antoni Fertner as President Bogusław Rolicz, Helenka's father
- Michał Znicz as Professor Frankiewicz, Stefan's uncle
- Jadwiga Andrzejewska as Jadzia Pietrusińska
- Stanisław Sielański as Secretary Jarząbek
- Józef Orwid as Marcin, the coachman
- Władysław Grabowski as a partner in Rolicz's company
- Jerzy Roland as Alfred
- Alina Żeliska as Lili Fontelli
- Renata Radojewska as Rena
- Teodozja Bohdańska as the headmistress
- Roman Dereń as a partner in Rolicz's company (not credited)
- Janina Krzymuska as the cooking teacher (not credited)
- Wincenty Łoskot as Jan, Rolicz's butler (not credited)
- Zygmunt Regro-Regirer as the waiter at the Imperial restaurant and dance hall (not credited)
- Mieczysław Winkler as the receptionist at the Continental hotel (not credited)
- Wacław Zdanowicz as the bartender at the Imperial restaurant and dance hall (not credited)

== Production ==
I was supposed to leave Warsaw and head east to Vawkavysk, where I was going to work in an office. But I had to wait a bit for the position to become available. Because of that, I had a lot of free time, so together with my friends from the Wysocka's school, we decided to work as extras. They paid well, and for a couple of days, we traveled to Warsaw, where we witnessed the filming of all the main scenes.
– Stanisława Sobiech, background actress

In the first half of 1938, a group of filmmakers and producers established a private limited company called Omnia-Film to produce the musical comedy Zapomniana melodia. The first information about starting the creation of this new film project appeared in the May issues of Wiadomości Filmowe, followed by further news in the weekly magazine Kino and the monthly magazine Srebrny Ekran. The directors of the production were Konrad Tom and Jan Fethke, with the screenplay by Napoleon Sądek, Jan Fethke, and Ludwik Starski. The music was prepared by Henryk Wars, while the lyrics of the songs – Ach, jak przyjemnie! and Już nie zapomnisz mnie – as well as the modern arrangement signed as Panie Janie (w stylu jazz) were composed by Ludwik Starski.

The main female role was played by Helena Grossówna, while the main male character was portrayed by Aleksander Żabczyński. The rest of the cast included Antoni Fertner, Michał Znicz, Stanisław Sielański, Józef Orwid, Władysław Drabowski, Teodozja Bohdańska, Jadwiga Andrzejewska, Alina Żeliska, and Renata Radojewska. In the role of boarders, besides Grossówna, Andrzejewska, and Radojewska, background actors, who were students at Tacjanna Wysocka's dance school (advertised in the press as "the most beautiful Warsaw women"), also appeared.

The filming took place at the Falanga studio on Trębacka Street in Warsaw, with outdoor takes filmed in Zegrzynek near Warsaw, and other smaller scenes shot on the streets of Warsaw, such as Traugutta Street. The filming was completed in early November.

The premiere of Zapomniana melodia took place on 25 November 1938, at the Pan cinema in Warsaw. The film was a box office success. The audience flocked to cinemas, and Ach, jak przyjemnie! and Już nie zapomnisz mnie became hit songs. Helena Grossówna accepted the film studio's proposal to attend every premiere of the film in major cities across Poland.

== Reception ==
=== Reviews ===
Stefania Heymanowa, associated with the weekly magazine Bluszcz, did not share the enthusiasm of the audience. She believed that Zapomniana melodia repeated all the imperfections of Polish comedy: the lack of reflection of Polish realities of the setting and the presented environment, the senselessness of the script, the lack of plot logic, the blind imitation of American life and customs, the lack of in-depth character development (the boarders resemble more of a group of girls; they lack individual traits). In the summary of her review, she wrote: In total, "Zapomniana melodia" is at most a farce, with a few pleasant songs, and one should not be deluded that it is a model for Polish musical comedy. Anna Zahorska from Kultura appreciated the fairly cohesive script, the wit of some scenes, and the actors' performances (with the exception of Żabczyński, who apart from his looks, did not impress with much else, moving as if indifferent). In a further opinion, she echoed Heymanowa: Couldn't the screenwriters' imagination come up with a more pleasant combination? These trivialities, moralisms, displays of human inferiority, the incredibly low level of the characters, the poor atmosphere of each script, this mixing of school with dancing always characterizes films made in Poland. Additionally, she sarcastically referred to the music, which should be at a concert level, not a revue level.

Other press reviewers, including Kino, Wiadomości Filmowe, 5-ta Rano, Kurier Czerwony, and Kurier Poznański, while pointing out some flaws in the film, expressed positive opinions about it. Some of them compared the beginning of Zapomniana melodia, with the schoolgirls singing while kayaking, to the first scenes of Mad About Music (1938, directed by Norman Taurog) with Deanna Durbin at the helm, where a group of boarders sang while riding bicycles on a wide avenue. Additionally, they unanimously agreed that the acting was very good. A reviewer, hiding under the pseudonym "Kl.", was of the opinion that: Grossówna and Andrzejewska here appear as if racing nobly for the palm of precedence, which must be awarded to each of them, as they created two distinct types of boarders: the scatterbrain and the romantic. We're short on lovers here. But it must be admitted that Żabczyński is faultless in his role. He loves and sings as required, he's handsome and photogenic. The lack of a second lover is not only lamented by Polish cinema... The burden of comedy is divided among several stars borrowed from the stage: on the reliable Fertner, on the professionally seconding him in the amusing role of the devoted secretary Sielański, who in turn is always perfectly matched even in bit parts by Orwid and Grabowski.

=== Years later ===
Leszek Armatys dedicated an essay to the production, in which he stated that the smoothly executed Zapomniana melodia brought relaxation and cheerfulness to Poles during the increasingly real threat of war. The critic praised the creators for assembling a cast of movie stars and entrusting them with roles consistent with their typecasting, refreshing the comedic formula by adding a group of girls unseen before in Polish cinema, fulfilling the role of revue girls. Additionally, he appreciated the skillful use of the formula of American sentimental comedies, driving the action with continuous misunderstandings, and using musical scenes (the jazzy vocal-dance improvisation of Frère Jacques canon by the girls on assembled school benches). In summarizing his statement, he complained about escapism, shallowness, and vulgarity of some comedic devices, but above all, he praised Zapomniana melodia because next to a few other films made at the end of the Second Polish Republic, it was a work (among comedies – the only one!) in which a certain efficiency of execution finally began to pay off after decades of experience: a certain efficiency of execution was revealed, expected for years. And even more: as if there was a certain distance from the operetta convention used commonly in Polish film comedies. Film scholars and film historians such as Tadeusz Lubelski, Jan Lewandowski, Marek Haltof, and Jerzy Toeplitz considered Zapomniana melodia to be a first-rate musical comedy of the interwar period in terms of craftsmanship.

== Songs ==
Everything was happening in a studio-arranged classroom. We pushed the benches aside and started dancing on them. It was all done on the fly. There were no rehearsals or even practicing steps. We were supposed to do something like tap dancing. We were professional dancers, so we had the right preparation. It turned out very well, and there was no need to reshoot that scene. Then a few more shots and close-ups were taken of us sitting in the benches.
– Stanisława Sobiech, background actress

Songs performed in the film by the original group were soon performed by various singers for record labels:

- Frère Jacques (Swing-Foxtrot) – Adam Aston accompanied by the Dance Orchestra Syrena Record; conductor: Henryk Wars (December 1938)
- Ach, jak przyjemnie! (Foxtrot) – Adam Aston accompanied by the Dance Orchestra Syrena Record; conductor: Henryk Wars (December 1938)
- Już nie zapomnisz mnie (Slowfox) – Adam Aston accompanied by the Dance Orchestra Syrena Record; conductor: Henryk Wars (December 1938)
- Już nie zapomnisz mnie (Slowfox) – Zbigniew Rawicz accompanied by the Dance Orchestra Syrena Record (January 1939)
- Ach, jak przyjemnie! (Foxtrot) – Zbigniew Rawicz accompanied by the Dance Orchestra Syrena Record (January 1939)
- Już nie zapomnisz mnie (Slowfox) – Albert Harris accompanied by the Dance Orchestra Odeon Records; conductor: Jerzy Gert
- Ach, jak przyjemnie! (Foxtrot) – Albert Harris accompanied by the Dance Orchestra Odeon Records; conductor: Jerzy Gert
- Już nie zapomnisz mnie (Slowfox) – Mieczysław Fogg for the Victor record label (early 1939)
- Ach, jak przyjemnie! (Foxtrot) – Mieczysław Fogg for the Victor record label (early 1939)

Since 2012, an annual competition for film songs titled Zapomniana melodia has been held at the Industrial Cultural Center in Rybnik-Niewiadom.

== Bibliography ==
=== Press ===
- "Dziś premiera". Kurier Warszawski. Vol. 25, no. 324. Warsaw: Feliks Mrozowski and Konrad Olchowica. 1938.
- Heymanowa, Stefania (1938). "Z życia ekranu". Bluszcz. Vol. 24, no. 52. Warsaw: Michał Glücksberg.
- "Na świetlanej scenie". 5-ta Rano. Vol. 19, no. 353. Warsaw: Prasa Nowa. 1938. Archived from the original on 2019-10-18.
- Brun, Leon, ed. (2 Oct 1938a). "Na okładkach". Kino (in Polish). Vol. 9, no. 40. Warsaw: Prasa Polska S.A.
- Brun, Leon, ed. (1938b). "Na ekranach polskich". Kino (in Polish). Vol. 9, no. 50. Warsaw: Prasa Polska S.A.
- Hermelm, Bronisław, ed. (1 May 1938a). "Niniejszym podajemy do wiadomości..." Wiadomości Filmowe (in Polish). Vol. 6, no. 9. Warsaw: Ignacy Rotsztadt-Miastecki.
- Hermelm, Bronisław, ed. (15 May 1938b). "Niniejszym komunikujemy..." Wiadomości Filmowe (in Polish). Vol. 6, no. 10. Warsaw: Ignacy Rotsztadt-Miastecki.
- Hermelm, Bronisław, ed. (1 Dec 1938c). "Z polskiego świata filmowego". Wiadomości Filmowe (in Polish). Vol. 6, no. 23. Warsaw: Ignacy Rotsztadt-Miastecki.
- "Z kin poznańskich". Kurier Poznański. Vol. 27, no. 588. Poznań: Prasa Polska. 1938.
- "W polskim świecie filmowym". Kino. Vol. 6, no. 45. Warsaw: Prasa Polska S.A. 1938.
- "W polskim świecie filmowym". Kino. Vol. 20, no. 47. Warsaw: Prasa Polska S.A. 1938.
- "Wędrówka po ateliers". Kino. Vol. 25, no. 39. Warsaw: Prasa Polska S.A. 1938.
- Saliński, Stanisław Maria, ed. (1938). "Na srebrnym ekranie". Kurier Czerwony. Vol. 28, no. 329. Warsaw: Prasa Polska.
- Zahorska, Anna (1938). "Recenzje filmowe". Kultura. Vol. 11, no. 50. Poznań: Stanisław Bross.

=== Studies ===
- Armatys, Leszek; Armatys, Barbara; Stradomski, Wiesław (1988). Historia filmu polskiego. Vol. 2. Warsaw: Wydawnictwa Artystyczne i Filmowe. ISBN 8322103689.
- Armatys, Leszek; Stradomski, Wiesław (1988). Od "Niewolnicy zmysłów" do "Czarnych diamentów". Szkice o polskich filmach z lat 1914–1939. Warsaw: Centralny Ośrodek Metodyki Upowszechniania Kultury. ISBN 837010049X.
- Haltof, Marek (2004). Kino polskie. Translated by Przylipiak, Mirosław. Gdańsk: Słowo/obraz terytoria. ISBN 8389405385.
- Kydryński, Lucjan (1993). Kino muzyczne. Przewodnik po filmach muzycznych 1927–1992. Warsaw: Wydawnictwa Artystyczne i Filmowe. ISBN 8322106440.
- Lewandowski, Jan F. (1997). 100 filmów polskich. Katowice: Videograf II. ISBN 8371833261.
- Lerski, Tomasz (2004). Syrena Record. Pierwsza polska wytwórnia fonograficzna 1904–1939. New York-Warsaw: Editions "Karin". ISBN 8391718905.
- Lubelski, Tadeusz (2015). Historia kina polskiego 1895–2014. Kraków: Towarzystwo Autorów i Wydawców Prac Naukowych "Universitas". ISBN 9788324227075.
- Toeplitz, Jerzy (1969). Historia sztuki filmowej. Vol. IV. Warsaw: Wydawnictwa Artystyczne i Filmowe. ISBN 9788324227075.
- Zajiček, Edward (2009). Poza ekranem. Kinematografia polska 1896–2005. Warsaw: Stowarzyszenie Filmowców Polskich. ISBN 8392391942.
