= Romeo i Julcia =

1933 Polish comedy

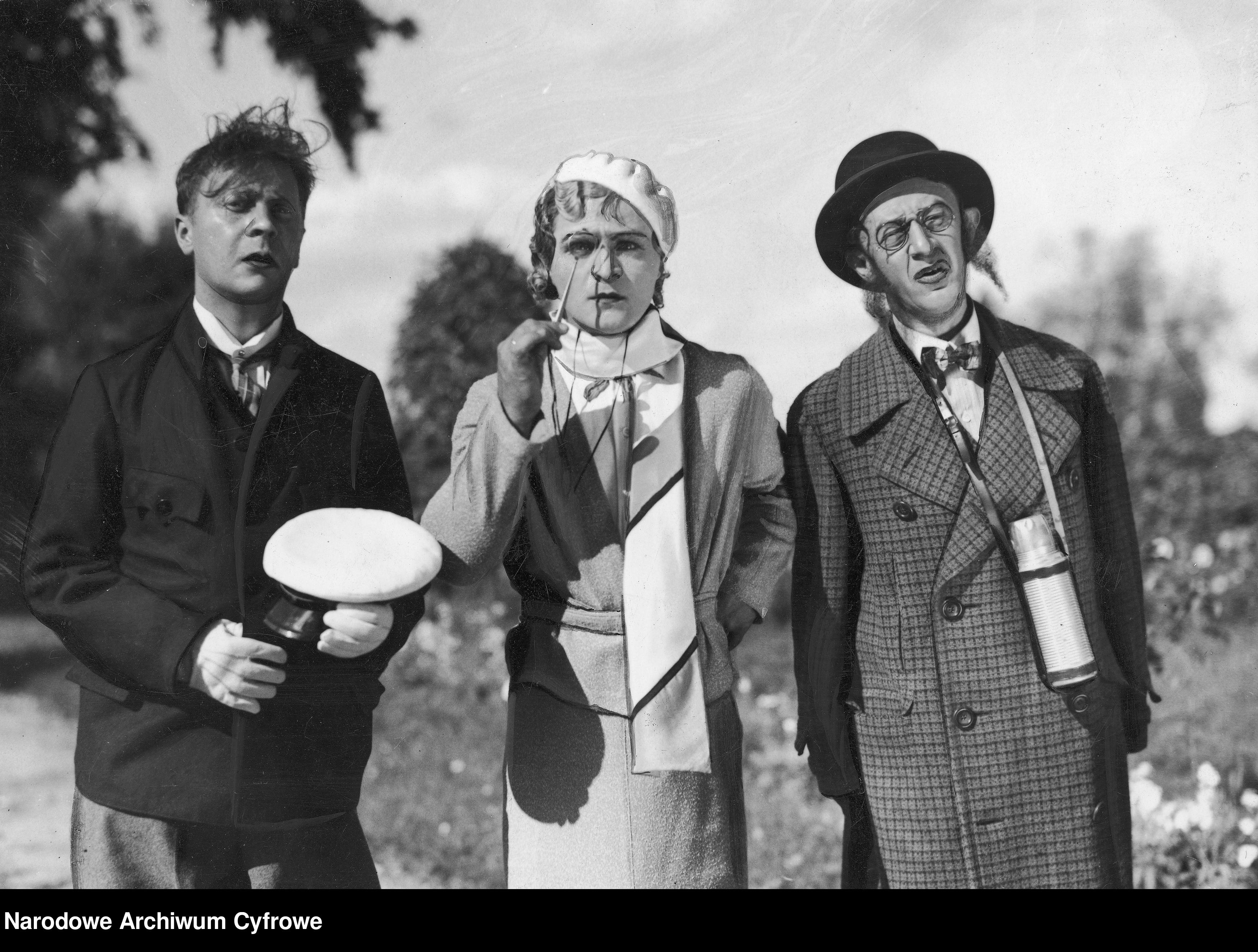
- Stanisław Sielański, Adolf Dymsza, and Konrad Tom in a scene from the film
- Directed by: Jan Nowina-Przybylski
- Written by: Napoleon Sądek, Konrad Tom
- Produced by: Dawid Lebenbaum
- Starring: Zula Pogorzelska, Adolf Dymsza, Konrad Tom, Stanisław Sielański, Antoni Fertner
- Cinematography: Antoni Wawrzyniak
- Music by: Henryk Wars, Konrad Tom
- Production company: Del-film
- Release date: January 21, 1933 (Poland)
- Running time: 71 minutes
- Country: Poland
- Language: Polish

Romeo i Julcia is a Polish black-and-white comedy from 1933 directed by Jan Nowina-Przybylski, based on a screenplay by Napoleon Sądek. The film's plot revolves around the activities of a matrimonial agency and a school of good manners called Romeo i Julcia, run by Teofil Rączka (Adolf Dymsza) and Moniek Platfus (Konrad Tom). Among the students at the school is Frania Krochmalska (Zula Pogorzelska). Soon, the owners receive an assignment to dissuade the Koziegłowicz family (Antoni Fertner and Irena Skwierczyńska) from an American girl they have chosen as a future wife for their son Roman (Wacław Ścibor-Rylski). However, the boy has fallen in love with the forester's daughter, Krysia (Maria Nobisówna). To carry out their plan, Teofil disguises himself in women's clothing and pretends to be an American woman.

The production of Romeo i Julcia received mixed reviews from critics. They were critical of the screenplay, cinematography, editing, and sound quality, as well as the overall quality of the film. However, the performances of the actors received positive feedback.

== Plot ==
Docent Teofil Rączka and Professor Moniek Platfus establish a matrimonial agency called Romeo i Julcia, which also serves as a school of good manners. Among the students is a laundress named Frania Krochmalska, who seeks to learn proper behavior during meals and dancing. Soon, the agency successfully arranges the marriage of Adela Gzyms and Walery Łypko. One day, Teofil and Moniek check on the couple's progress. To their surprise, Adela and Walery start arguing and, upon seeing the agency owners, begin to chase them through the streets. The participants of the scuffle end up at the police station, where the owners clarify that they are not responsible for the state of the couple's marriage.

Meanwhile, Frania is fired from her job and finds work as a maid at the Koziegłowicz family's estate in a village near Warsaw. Their son, Roman, intends to spend his life with Krysia, the forester's daughter. However, the Koziegłowicz couple has other plans for him. They decide to set him up with Mary, the daughter of their wealthy friend from America. Shortly, Mary will be visiting Poland to meet them. Frania advises Roman to seek help from the Romeo i Julcia agency regarding the matter. Teofil disguises himself as Mary, while Moniek plays the role of her butler. At the party, Moniek does everything to dissuade Roman's parents from accepting the American girl. The scheme succeeds, as the Koziegłowicz family abandons their plans for their son's marriage. Roman generously rewards Teofil and Moniek, who use the money to set up a new, stylish marriage agency office.

== Cast ==
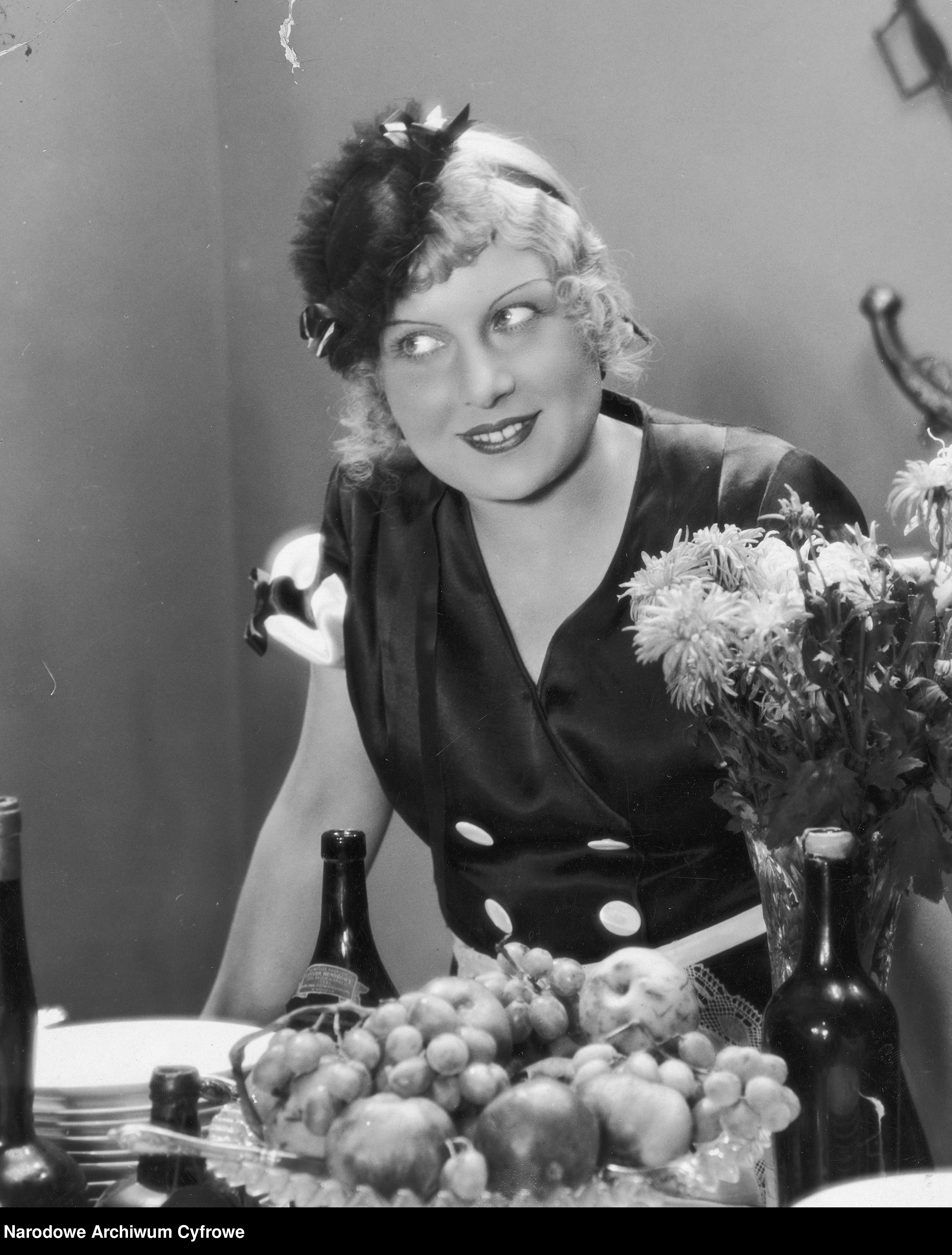
Zula Pogorzelska as Franka Krochmalska in one of the film's scenes

- Zula Pogorzelska as Franka Krochmalska
- Adolf Dymsza as Teofil Rączka
- Konrad Tom as Professor Moniek Platfus
- Stanisław Sielański as Lamus
- Antoni Fertner as Onufry Koziegłowicz
- Irena Skwierczyńska as Otylia, wife of Koziegłowicz
- Wacław Ścibor-Rylski as Roman, son of the Koziegłowicz family
- Maria Nobisówna as Krysia
- Stanisława Perzanowska as Adela Gzyms
- Zygmunt Chmielewski as Walery Łybko
- Ryszard Misiewicz as Kajtuś, who is trying to win Mary
- Józef Orwid as Kajtuś's father
- Stefania Betcherowa as the owner of the laundry Under the Stiff Collar (in the credits, name: Maria)
- Eugeniusz Koszutski – 2 roles: photographer; guest at the Koziegłowicz party
- Stanisław Belski as a gentleman from the confectionery
- Feliks Chmurkowski as carpenter Wiórek
- Bolesław Mierzejewski as the police commissioner
- Jerzy Roland as a representative of the Insurance Association
- Tekla Trapszo as Krysia's mother
- Wacława Szczuka-Wawa as a participant in the salon manners course (not credited)
- Halina Zawadzka as a participant in the salon manners course (not credited)

== Historical background ==
During the silent film era, comedy appeared very rarely in Polish cinema. This situation was due to the lack of suitable actors and creators capable of effectively preparing a comic silent show based on visual gags and the characters' struggles with life's adversities. This changed with the introduction of sound in Polish film in the early 1930s. In the 1929/1930 season, none of the 17 films produced represented this genre; however, by the turn of 1932 and 1933, 5 out of 12 premieres were comedies. Several factors contributed to the popularity of comedies (mainly in the form of farce or musical comedy) in the first half of the 1930s.

There were ready-made teams of actors and authors working in Warsaw's literary cabarets and revues, such as Qui Pro Quo, Teatr Banda, and Morskie Oko. Screenwriters from this environment or inspired by its representatives did not strive for originality and used plot patterns from French boulevard farces, Berlin musical comedies, and Viennese operettas, adding characters and motifs developed over the years on Warsaw's cabaret stages.

At that time, Great Depression affected all social strata. Viewers wanted to forget their daily worries, so themes of lottery wins, wealthy marriages, and surprising social promotions dominated comedies. Humor, based on banal and improbable situations, was accompanied by cheerful songs, catchy sayings, and satire on the petty bourgeoisie. The production of comedies was somewhat easier and sometimes a bit cheaper than producing films from other genres.

=== Production ===
The 254th issue of the newspaper ABC published on 5 September 1932 announced that filming for the movie Romeo i Julcia had begun, produced by Del-film. The film was directed by Jan Nowina-Przybylski, with a screenplay by Napoleon Sądek. The dialogues were written by Konrad Tom. The soundtrack was composed by Henryk Wars, featuring songs such as the tango Nie warto, the foxtrot To wszystko umiem ja, the march To jest bon ton, and the foxtrot Ho! Ho! with lyrics by Konrad Tom. Filming, conducted by Antoni Wawrzyniak, took place in the D’Alben Studio and on location. The set design was handled by Stefan Norris. The cast mainly included Konrad Tom, Adolf Dymsza, Zula Pogorzelska, Stanisław Sielański, and Antoni Fertner.

== Reception ==
=== Theatrical release and reviews ===
The premiere of Romeo i Julcia took place on 21 January 1933 at the Apollo cinema in Warsaw. The film remained in theaters until March 8.

Józef Fryd from the weekly Kino gave a clearly positive review of the film, describing the script as clever and humorous, with a large number of visual gags and funny situations. According to him, the story had a cohesive nature, and the music by Henryk Wars was of high quality; the film fulfilled its primary goal, which was to entertain the audience.

Reviews from Kurier Warszawski and Polska Zbrojna were somewhat less favorable. Both reviewers noted that the weaknesses of Romeo i Julcia were the lack of proper pacing, sluggish direction, underutilization of the cast and ideas, gaps in the script, and poor sound quality. Additionally, the second reviewer commented on the first part of the production, stating that it relied too much on "Jewish" humor, while the opening scene with the orchestra and the finale, though "good as an idea", were executed "without proper flair and expression". However, they overlooked these flaws due to several excellent scenes, such as the moment of "the supposed madness of the supposed American woman".

Romeo i Julcia was harshly criticized by Jerzy Toeplitz, Stefania Zahorska, and Stefania Heymanowa. Toeplitz wrote in Kurier Polski that Jan Nowina-Przybylski's production amounted to "repetitions, a lack of invention, still vulgar and tasteless jokes, and above all – boredom, hellish boredom. In this regard, Romeo i Julcia leads Polish film comedies – we have never seen anything so ineptly done, so far removed from cinema, and so unfunny". According to the critic, the script, photography, editing, and sound were of poor quality. Stefania Zahorska from Wiadomości Literackie called the film trash, made without "any cinematic sense" and lacking "even the most primitive craftsmanship honesty". Stefania Heymanowa echoed her sentiment, stating that after watching Romeo i Julcia, one feels "shame – that's the only emotion a viewer with at least some refined taste experiences. Not only do you feel ashamed that the film is made without a basic understanding of cinematography, but even more so that this is what Polish humor looks like! Crudeness, triviality, and a complete lack of culture. At best, it's vulgar, coarse laughter like that of washerwomen and market sellers from Kercelak. How can one dream of art – of a smile!".

Most critics praised the acting performances. A journalist from Polska Zbrojna stated, "the entire cast does a good job. The viewer's attention is mainly drawn to Dymsza, excellent in the role of the American woman. This popular comic proved his wide range of talent. Konrad Tom is amusing as Professor Platfus, but his humor is based almost exclusively on 'Jewish humor' dialogues. Stanisław Sielański revealed an extraordinary comic talent in the role of the stuttering secretary of the matchmaking office 'Romeo i Julcia'. Zula Pogorzelska has little room to shine. Fertner and Skwierczyńska play their roles well. All actors in the supporting roles maintain the overall standard". Toeplitz was more critical in his note: "Tom is unbearably 'Jewish', and Dymsza, potentially excellent material for an actor, was 'let loose' by the director. Zula Pogorzelska emerges relatively unscathed, perhaps because her role is small and insignificant. Fertner is good in a dull, structurally weak episode. The others don't need mentioning – maybe Sielański, who overacts but is undoubtedly talented, stands out favorably".

=== Years later ===
When comparing ten Polish comedies from the early 1930s, Leszek and Barbara Armatys gave a negative assessment of Romeo i Julcia, Sto metrów miłości (1932), and Pieśniarz Warszawy (1934). In their opinion, these films were mass-produced according to prevailing trends, providing easy entertainment suited to the tastes of "sappers, cooks, and domestic helpers". However, according to them, like other representatives of this genre, they do hold some value, namely in showcasing the style of famous cabaret artists of the time and elements of Warsaw dialect.

Jerzy Toeplitz deemed Romeo i Julcia, Sto metrów miłości, Ułani, ułani, chłopcy malowani (1932), and 10% dla mnie (1933) as crude. He particularly condemned the "coarse humor, often toilet-type", and criticized the actors' performances, stating that instead of showcasing their comedic talents, they were "fooling around".

Karolina Kosińska analyzed four films: Romeo i Julcia, Czy Lucyna to dziewczyna? (1934), Książątko (1937), and Piętro wyżej (1937). She argued that the motif of characters cross-dressing as the opposite sex is not merely a comedic plot device. The role reversal "creates an aura of ambiguous sexuality that transcends the norms of bourgeois mores in the interwar period".

== Bibliography ==
- Armatys, L.; Stradomski, W. (1988). Od "Niewolnicy zmysłów" do "Czarnych diamentów". Szkice o polskich filmach z lat 1914–1939 [From "The Slave of the Senses" to "Black Diamonds": Sketches on Polish Films from 1914 to 1939] (in Polish). Warsaw: Centralny Ośrodek Metodyki Upowszechniania Kultury. ISBN 83-7010-049-X.
- Armatys, L.; Armatys, B.; Stradomski, W. (1988). Historia filmu polskiego [History of Polish Cinema] (in Polish). Vol. 2. Warsaw: Wydawnictwa Artystyczne i Filmowe. ISBN 83-221-0368-9.
- Toeplitz, Jerzy (1959). Historia sztuki filmowej [History of Film Art] (in Polish). Vol. III. Warsaw: Wydawnictwa Artystyczne i Filmowe.
