= Konrad Tom =

Polish actor, writer, singer (1887–1957)

Konrad Tom Konrad Runowiecki
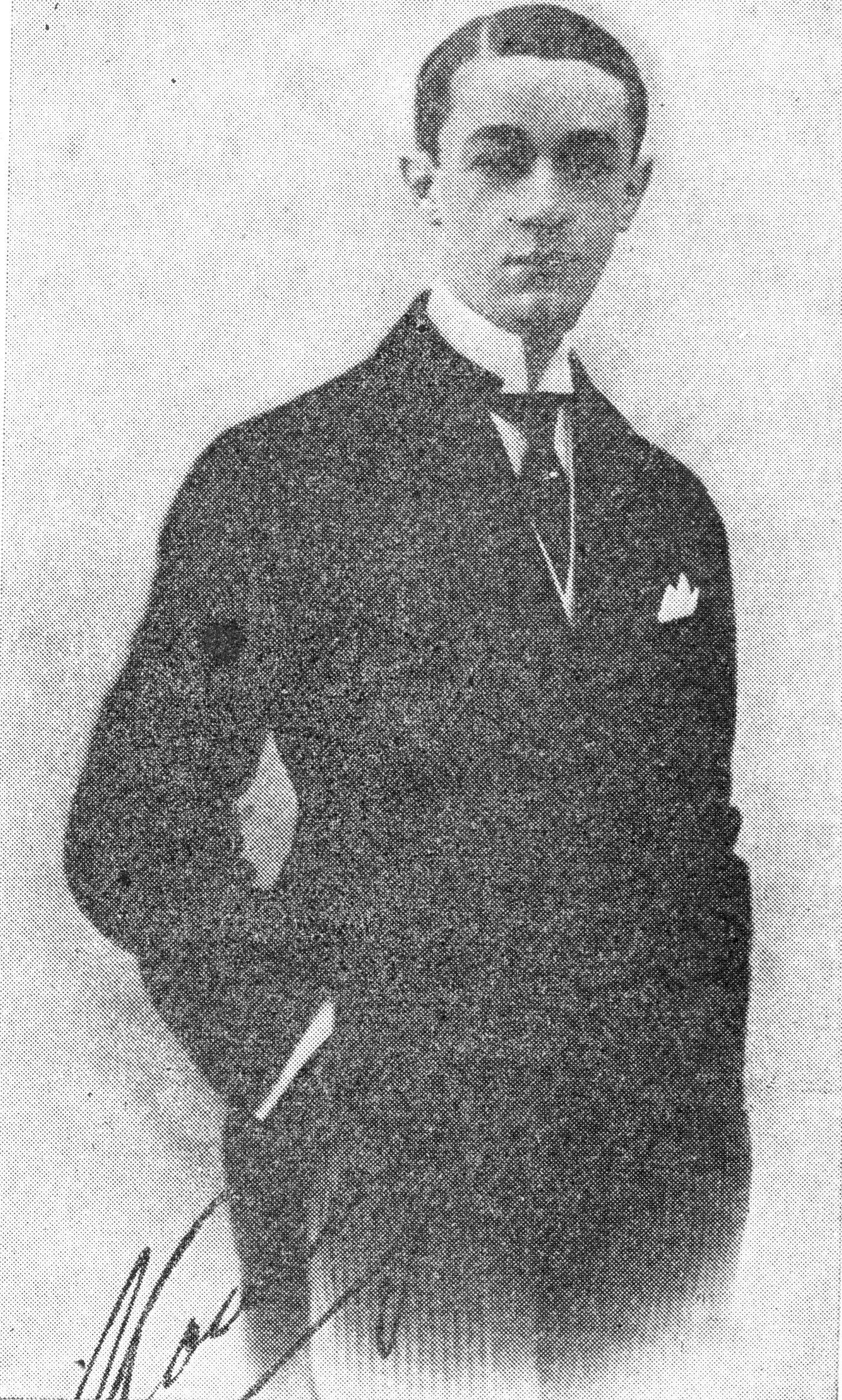
- Tom, c. 1919

Background information
- Born: 9 April 1887; Warsaw, Poland
- Origin: Jewish-Polish
- Died: 9 August 1957 (aged 70) Los Angeles, California, U.S.
- Genres: Film and cabaret
- Occupations: Actor, singer-songwriter

Konrad Tom (9 April 1887 – 9 August 1957), born Konrad Runowiecki, was a Polish Jewish actor, writer, singer and director born in Warsaw. He wrote song lyrics in Polish and in Yiddish for stage, film and cabaret, including szmonces. His wife was actress Zula Pogorzelska.

Yiddish talkies were not only comparable to those of the Polish mainstream but were produced by the same people. The most successful Yiddish talkies were directed by established industry figures including Waszyński, Ford, Henryk Szaro, Jan Nowina-Przybylski, Leon Trystan, and Konrad Tom.

== Selected filmography ==
=== Screenplays ===
- Rivals (1925)
- Is Lucyna a Girl? (1934)
- Antek policmajster 1935 (with Emanuel Schlechter)
- Ada, to nie wypada 1936
- Bolek i Lolek and Dodek na froncie, 1936, both starred Adolf Dymsza, music Henryk Wars and Walter Dana
- Yidl Mitn Fidl (Judeł gra na skrzypcach), Yiddish, 1936, starring Molly Picon
- Książatko 1937
- Three Troublemakers (1937)
- A Diplomatic Wife (Dyplomatyczna żona) (1937)
- Adventure in Warsaw (Abenteuer in Warschau) (1937)
- Mamele, Yiddish, 1938, starring Molly Picon, music director Ivo Wesby
- Włóczegi 1939
- Wielka droga 1946

=== Song lyrics ===
- Kocha, lubi, szanuje (with Emanuel Schlechter, performed by Mieczysław Fogg)
- Nic o tobie nie wiem (with Emanuel Schlechter, music Henryk Wars)
- Zlociste wloski, Tyle milosci performed by Eugeniusz Bodo
- Madame Loulou to music by Harry Waldau

=== Actor ===
- 1932 – Sto metrów miłości
- 1933 – Jego ekscelencja subiekt
- 1933 – Romeo i Julcia
- 1934 – Co mój mąż robi w nocy?
- 1935 – ABC miłości
- 1935 – Antek policmajster
- 1935 – Wacuś
- 1937 – Miss Minister Is Dancing
