= Ach, śpij kochanie =

Popular Polish lullaby

- by Henryk Wars and Ludwik Starski
- English: Oh, sleep, my darling
- Genre: Lullaby
- Language: Polish
- Composed: 1938

Ach, śpij kochanie (English: Oh, sleep, my darling) is a popular Polish lullaby. It was written in 1938 by Henryk Wars and Ludwik Starski.

The song was first performed in Poland by Adolf Dymsza and Eugeniusz Bodo in the 1938 movie Paweł i Gaweł. It was also performed in the 1939 Polish comedy film Włóczęgi.
