= Allan Starski =

Polish production designer (born 1943)

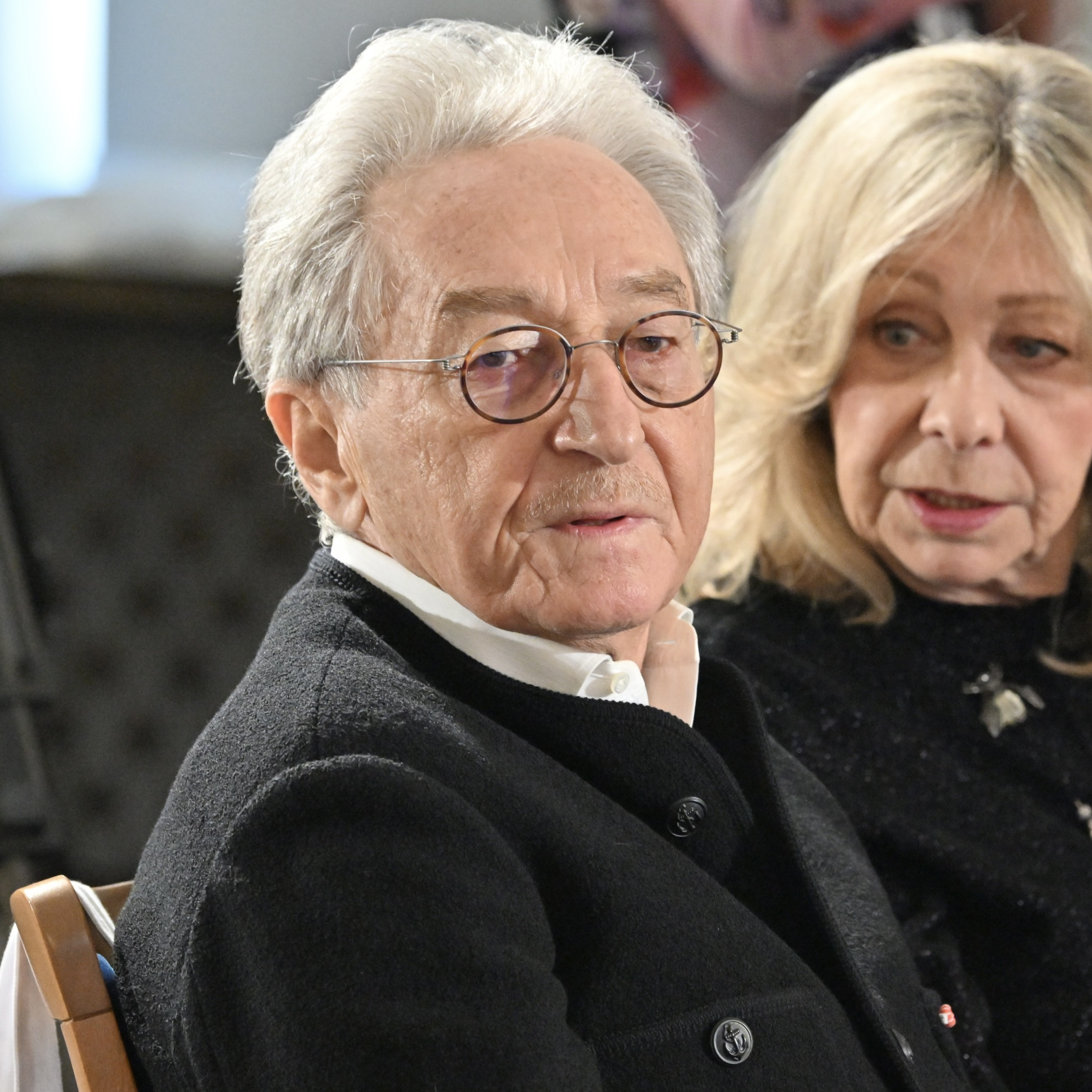
- Born: 1 January 1943 (age 83); Warsaw, Poland
- Occupations: Production designer, set decorator
- Years active: 1973 – present

Allan Mieczysław Starski (born 1 January 1943 in Warsaw) is a Polish Oscar-winning production designer and set decorator.

== Life and career ==
Allan Starski is the son of Ludwik Starski (originally Ludwik Kałuszyner) famous screenwriter and songwriter of Jewish descent (such as Zapomniana melodia and "Piętro wyżej"). In 1969, he graduated with a degree in architecture from the Academy of Fine Arts in Warsaw (Pol. Akademia Sztuk Pięknych).

His first work as a production designer was in a film by Ryszard Ber called Chłopcy (Boys) in 1973. Starski collaborated with famous Polish Oscar and Palme d'Or-winning director Andrzej Wajda on projects like Człowiek z marmuru (Man of Marble), Człowiek z żelaza (Man of Iron), Panny z Wilka (The Maids of Wilko) and Pan Tadeusz. Starski also worked on stage productions with Wajda, Aleksander Bardini, Arthur Miller and Andrzej Łapicki.

In 1993, he won an Academy Award (shared with Ewa Braun) for Best Art Direction/Set Decoration for Steven Spielberg's Schindler's List. He also has worked with Agnieszka Holland (Europe, Europe and Washington Square) and Jerzy Stuhr (Historie miłosne-Love stories). Starski worked with Roman Polanski on The Pianist in 2002 (winning a Cesar Award) and Oliver Twist in 2005. His latest projects are the American films Hannibal Rising by Peter Webber and Snow Princess by Mark Roemmich.

== See also ==
- Cinema of Poland
- List of Poles
- List of Polish Academy Award winners and nominees
