= Robert and Bertram (1938 film) =

1938 film

- Directed by: Mieczysław Krawicz
- Written by: Gustav Räder (play); Johann Nestroy (sketches); Jan Fethke; Napoleon Sądek; Emanuel Schlechter; Ludwik Starski
- Produced by: Józef Rosen
- Starring: Helena Grossówna; Eugeniusz Bodo; Adolf Dymsza; Antoni Fertner
- Cinematography: Stanisław Lipiński
- Music by: Henry Vars
- Production company: Rex-Film
- Release date: 12 January 1938
- Running time: 80 minutes
- Country: Poland
- Language: Polish

Robert and Bertram (Polish: Robert i Bertrand) is a 1938 Polish comedy film directed by Mieczysław Krawicz and starring Helena Grossówna, Eugeniusz Bodo and Adolf Dymsza. It was inspired by a comedy sketch by Johann Nestroy which was in turn based on an 1856 farce Robert and Bertram by the German writer Gustav Räder featuring two wandering vagrants with hearts of gold. A German adaptation was made the following year. The film's sets were designed by the art directors Jacek Rotmil and Stefan Norris.

== Cast ==
- Helena Grossówna as Irena
- Eugeniusz Bodo as Bertrand
- Adolf Dymsza as Robert
- Mieczysława Ćwiklińska as siostra Ippla
- Antoni Fertner as Ippel, ojciec Ireny
- Michał Znicz as baron Dobkiewicz
- Józef Orwid as dozorca więzienia
- Julian Krzewiński as lokaj
- Feliks Żukowski as pan młody
- Henryk Małkowski
- Edmund Minowicz
- Wincenty Łoskot

== Bibliography ==
- Haltof, Marek. Historical Dictionary of Polish Cinema. Rowman & Littlefield Publishers, 2015.
- Skaff, Sheila. The Law of the Looking Glass: Cinema in Poland, 1896-1939. Ohio University Press, 2008.
