= Harry Waldau =

German musician and composer

- Born: Valentin Pinner; 1876; Liegnitz, Germany
- Died: 1943 (aged 66–67); Auschwitz concentration camp
- Occupations: Musician, Composer

Harry Waldau (born Valentin Pinner) (1876–1943), born in Liegnitz, Germany, was murdered in the Auschwitz concentration camp.

He was a Jewish pianist, composer and lyricist and part of the 1920s cabaret scene in Berlin, writing songs like Savannah Tango, Mensch komm mal rüber, Warum kiekste mir denn immer uff die Beene and Die Tausend-Kronen-Note for singer Claire Waldoff. Konrad Tom wrote Polish words for Waldau's Madame Loulou and Adam Aston performed it.

Waldau was deported on 2 March 1943 from Berlin on Transport 32 and murdered in Auschwitz later that month.

Waldau also composed the music for the 1930 film Retreat on the Rhine.
