= Ludwik Sempoliński =

Polish film actor

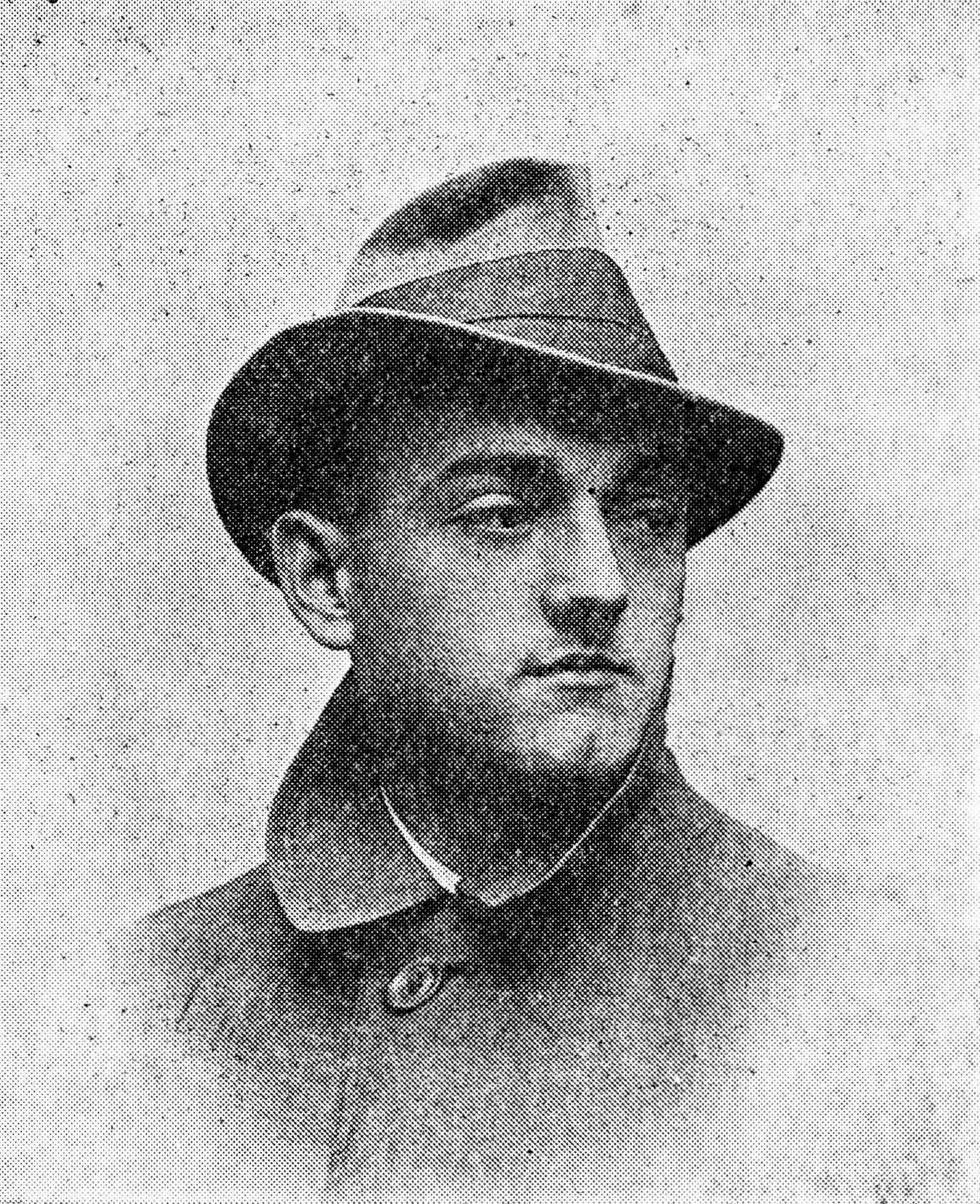
- Ludwik Sempoliński in 1917
- Born: 18 August 1899; Warsaw, Congress Poland
- Died: 17 April 1981 (aged 81); Warsaw, Poland
- Occupation: Actor
- Years active: 1935-1966

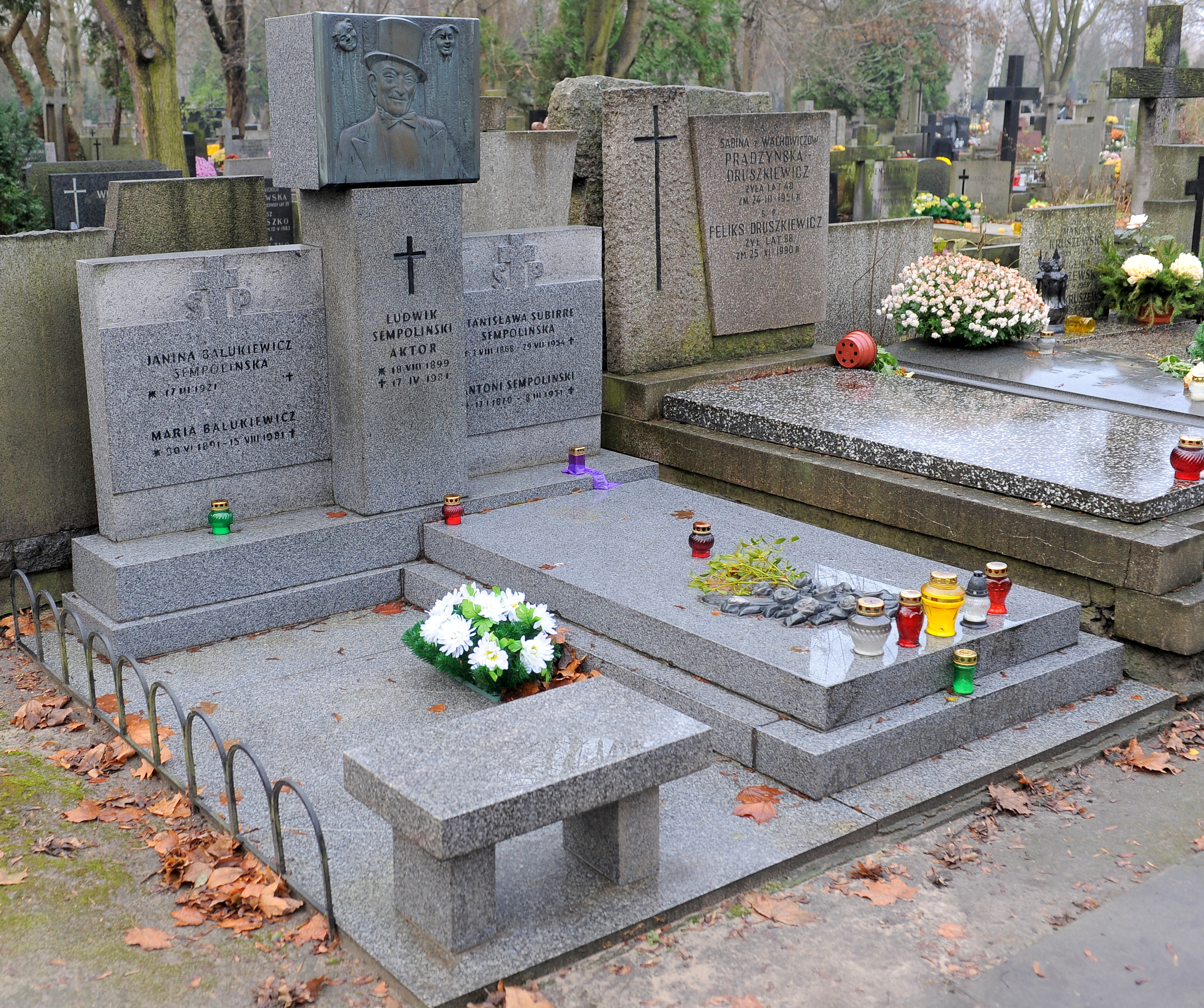
Grave of Sempoliński at the Powązki Cemetery in Warsaw

Ludwik Sempoliński (18 August 1899 – 17 April 1981) was a Polish film actor. He appeared in twenty films between 1935 and 1966.

== Selected filmography ==
- Jaśnie pan szofer (1935)
- Barbara Radziwiłłówna (1936)
- Róża (1936)
- Piętro wyżej (1937)
- Three Troublemakers (1937)
- Paweł i Gaweł (1938)
- A Sportsman Against His Will (1940)
- Warsaw Premiere (1951)
- Irena do domu! (1955)
