= Mielczarek =

Mielczarek is a surname. Notable people with the surname include:

- Klemens Mielczarek (1920–2006), Polish actor
- Marcin Mielczarek (born 1982), Polish Paralympic athlete
- Ray Mielczarek (1946–2013), Welsh footballer
