= Gehenna (1938 film) =

1938 film

- Directed by: Michał Waszyński
- Written by: Helena Mniszek (novel), Anatol Stern (writer)
- Starring: Lidia Wysocka, Witold Zacharewicz, Bogusław Samborski, Ina Benita
- Cinematography: Albert Wywerka
- Music by: Ivo Wesby
- Release date: 29 October 1938
- Running time: 80 minutes
- Country: Poland
- Language: Polish

Gehenna, also known as Through Hell or Anguish, is a 1938 Polish melodrama film based on the 1914 novel of the same name by Helena Mniszkówna and directed by Michał Waszyński.

== Plot ==
After her mother's death, teenage Ania is cared for by her uncle Kościesza. While walking in the forest, Ania meets Prince Andrzej, and they fall in love. However, her uncle does not want to agree to this marriage, explaining that he would then have to give up the estate he manages. However, it turns out that the real reason is different. Uncle Kościesza also desires this girl despite their blood relationship. Desperate, Ania runs away to Andrzej. Kościesza decides to take revenge.

== Cast ==
- Lidia Wysocka... Ania Tarłówna
- Witold Zacharewicz ... Prince Andrzej Olelkowicz
- Bogusław Samborski ... Uncle Kościesza
- Ina Benita... Lorka, Ania's cousin
- Wlodzimierz Lozinski ... Jaś, Ania's cousin
- Antoni Fertner ... The Veterinarian
- Mieczysława Ćwiklińska ... Ewelina, the housekeeper
- Józef Orwid ... Grzegorz, the gamekeeper
- Jerzy Woskowski ... The lame tramp
- Stanisława Wysocka ... Ksenobia - the prince's nanny
- Seweryna Broniszówna ... Gypsy fortune teller
- Tadeusz Wesolowski ... Okszta, the pilot
- Tamara Paslawska ... The Gypsy queen
- Wanda Jakubinska ... Ania's mother
- Stefan Hnydziński ... The prince's manservant
