= The Haunted Manor (1936 film) =

1936 film

- Directed by: Leonard Buczkowski
- Written by: Jan Fethke; Jan Adolf Hertz
- Based on: The Haunted Manor by Jan Checinski
- Produced by: Marian Czauski
- Starring: Witold Conti; Helena Grossówna; Mieczyslawa Cwiklinska
- Cinematography: Albert Wywerka
- Music by: Adam Wieniawski
- Production company: Imago-Vox
- Distributed by: Star Film Company
- Release date: 14 April 1936
- Running time: 85 minutes
- Country: Poland
- Language: Polish

The Haunted Manor (Polish: Straszny dwór) is a 1936 Polish musical film directed by Leonard Buczkowski and starring Witold Conti, Helena Grossówna and Mieczyslawa Cwiklinska. The film's sets were designed by the art directors Stefan Norris and Jacek Rotmil. It is based on the opera The Haunted Manor composed by Stanisław Moniuszko.

== Cast ==
- Witold Conti as Stefan
- Helena Grossówna as Jadwiga
- Mieczyslawa Cwiklinska as Miecznikowa
- Kazimierz Czekotowski as Zbigniew
- Lucyna Szczepanska as Hanna
- Mariusz Maszynski as Damazy
- Stanislaw Sielanski as Jasiek
- Eugeniusz May as Swordsman
- Józef Orwid as Maciej
- Amelia Rotter-Jarninska as Royal Housekeeper

== Bibliography ==
- Balski, Grzegorz. Directory of Eastern European Film-makers and Films 1945–1991. Flicks Books, 1992.
- Skaff, Sheila. The Law of the Looking Glass: Cinema in Poland, 1896-1939. Ohio University Press, 2008.
