= Mieczysława Ćwiklińska =

Polish film actress, stage actor and singer

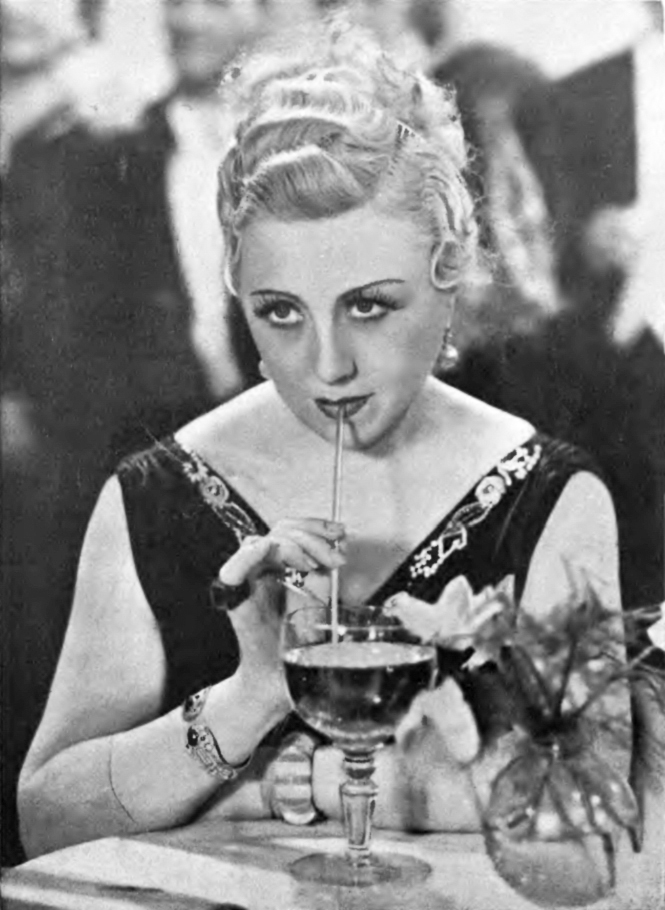
- Born: Mieczysława Trapszo; 1 January 1879; Lublin, Congress Poland
- Died: 28 July 1972 (aged 93); Warsaw, Poland
- Occupation: Actress

Mieczysława Ćwiklińska-Steinsberg (née Mieczysława Trapszo, Polish: [mʲɛt͡ʂɨ'swava 'trapʂɔ]; 1 January 1879 – 28 July 1972) was a Polish film actress, stage actor, and singer. She was often nicknamed Lińska or Amiette.

Born in Lublin, Poland, Ćwiklińska made her debut in 1900 at the Teatr Ludowy (The People's Theatre) in Warsaw in Michał Bałucki's play Grube Ryby. She was married three times, her last husband was the book publisher Marian Steinsberg.

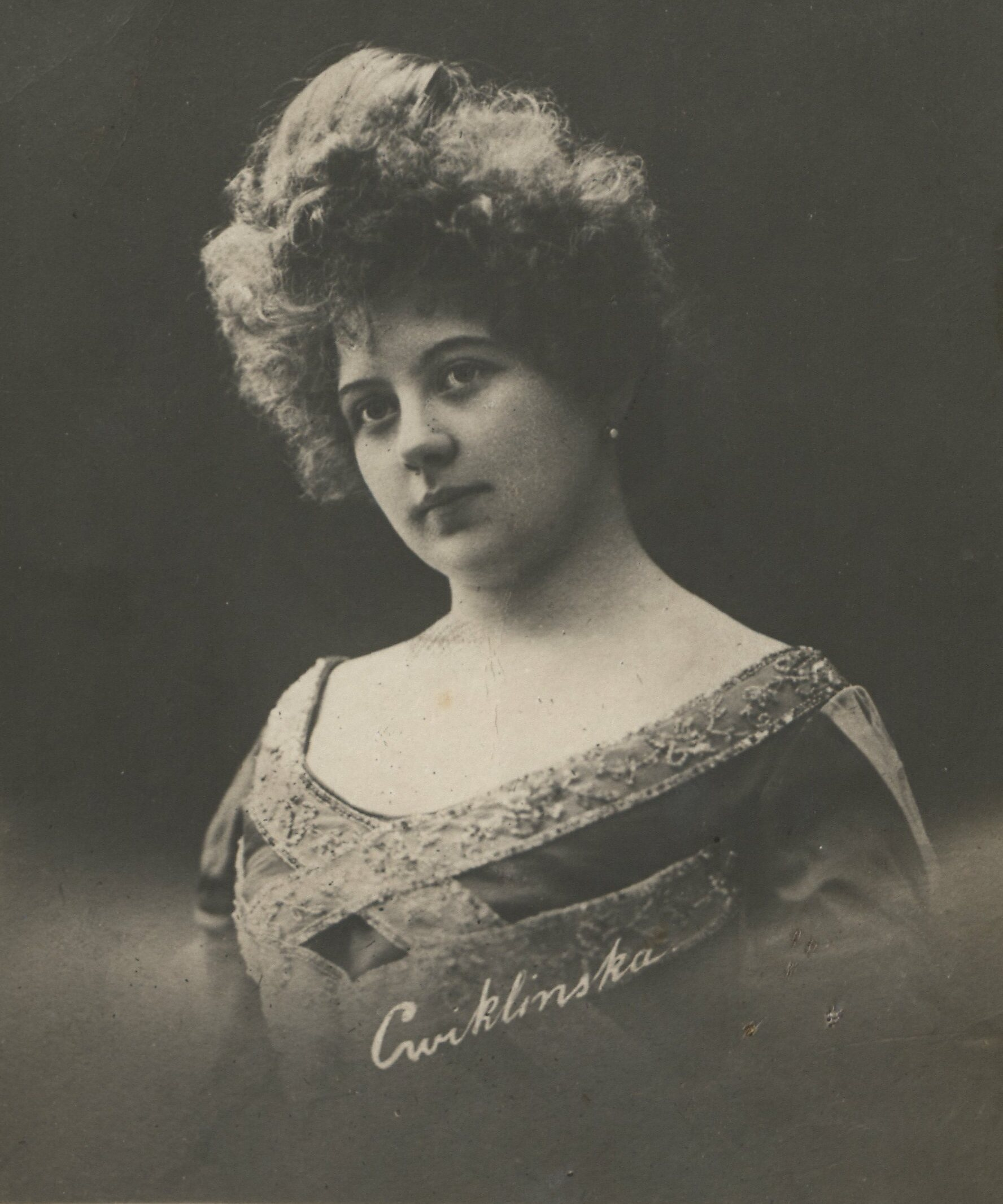
Mieczysława Ćwiklińska circa 1900

In 2013 the Polish Post issued a commemorative stamp of her, with Helena Grossówna and Adolf Dymsza.

== Partial filmography ==
- His Excellency, The Shop Assistant (Jego ekscelencja subiekt, 1933) - Mrs. Idalia Porecka
- Is Lucyna a Girl? (1934) (with Eugeniusz Bodo) - Countess Renata Czerminska
- Police Chief Antek (Antek policmajster, 1935) - The Governor's Wife
- Wacuś (1935) - The Widow Centkowska
- Panienka z poste restante (1935) - Mrs. Smith
- Dodek na froncie (1936) - Putkovnikova
- Pan Twardowski (1936) - Neta's Aunt
- The Haunted Manor (1936) - Swords-woman
- Jadzia (1936) - Mme. Oksza
- The Leper (1936) - Baroness Idalia Elzonowska
- American Adventure (1936) - Barbara Malska
- Miss Minister Is Dancing (1937) - Leopoldyna 'Polly' Gribaldi
- Count Michorowski (1937) - Baroness Idalia Elzonowska
- A Diplomatic Wife (1937) - Apolonia
- Dorożkarz nr 13 (1937) (with Stanislaw Sielanski in leading role) - Mrs. Tarska
- Pan redaktor szaleje (1937) - The Aunt
- Znachor (1937) - Florentyna Szkopkowa
- The Girls from Nowolipki (1937) - Raczynska
- Niedorajda (1937)
- Robert and Bertram (1938) - Ippel's Sister
- Adventure in Warsaw (1938) - Apollonia, komische Alte
- Heather (1938) - Ramszycowa
- Second Youth (Druga młodość, 1938) - Janina's Mother
- Strachy (1938) - Teresa's aunt
- Profesor Wilczur (1938) - Florentyna Szkopkowa
- The Line (1938) - Ziembiewiczowa
- Gehenna (1938) - Ewelina, the housekeeper
- Sygnały (1938) - Marquise de Boncroix
- Krystyna's Lie (1939) - Teofila Marlecka, Janek's mother
- Biały murzyn (1939) - Countess Lipska, Jadwiga's aunt
- Doctor Murek (1939) - Mrs. Czabranowa
- At the End of the Road (1939) - Kordelia, Gabriela's aunt
- Nad Niemnem (1939)
- Ja tu rządzę (1939) - Mother Lulewiczowna
- Złota Maska (1939) - Runicka - Ksawery's Mother
- Żołnierz królowej Madagaskaru (1940)
- Żona i nie żona (1941) - Baroness
- To Happiness Through Tears (1941) - Lena's secretary
- Testament profesora Wilczura (1942)
- Border Street (1948) - Mrs. Klara (final film role)

== Sources ==
- Bojarska, Maria (1988). Mieczysława Ćwiklińska (in Polish). Państwowy Instytut Wydawniczy. ISBN 83-06-01370-0.
