= Niedorajda =

1937 Polish film

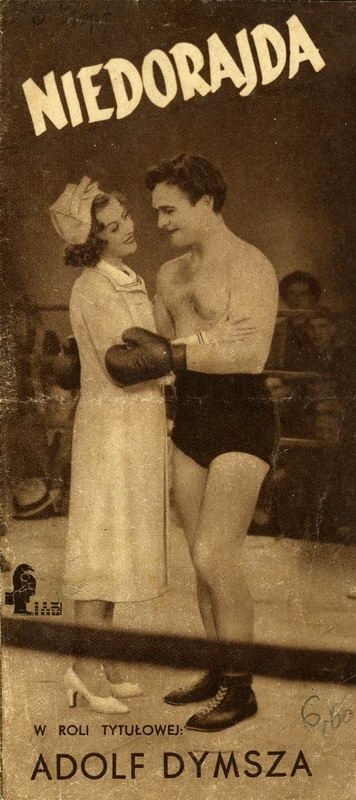
Niedorajda

Niedorajda is a 1937 Polish comedy film directed by Mieczysław Krawicz and produced by the Rex-Film studio. This comedy was also shown in the USA under the title Good for Nothing.

The film stars Adolf Dymsza playing a character who dresses up as a young girl, an alleged twin sister to gain the confidence of his sweetheart's guardian.

== Cast ==
- Adolf Dymsza as Florek Wegorzek
- Renata Radojewska as Basia
- Michał Znicz as Pan Rowek
- Józef Orwid as Onufry Majewski
- Wanda Jarszewska as Onufry's wife
- Andrzej Bogucki as Zenon Majewski
- Seweryna Broniszówna as Aunt Agata
- Irena Skwierczyńska as Marianna, the cook
- Adolf Kantor as Michal Koperski, boxer
- Jerzy Kobusz as 'Mruk', Florek's friend
- Klemens Mielczarek as Boxer 'Kciukinir', Florek's friend
- Zofia Wilczynska as Chambermaid
- Mieczyslaw Winkler as Antoni, Onufry's employee
