= Three Troublemakers =

1937 film

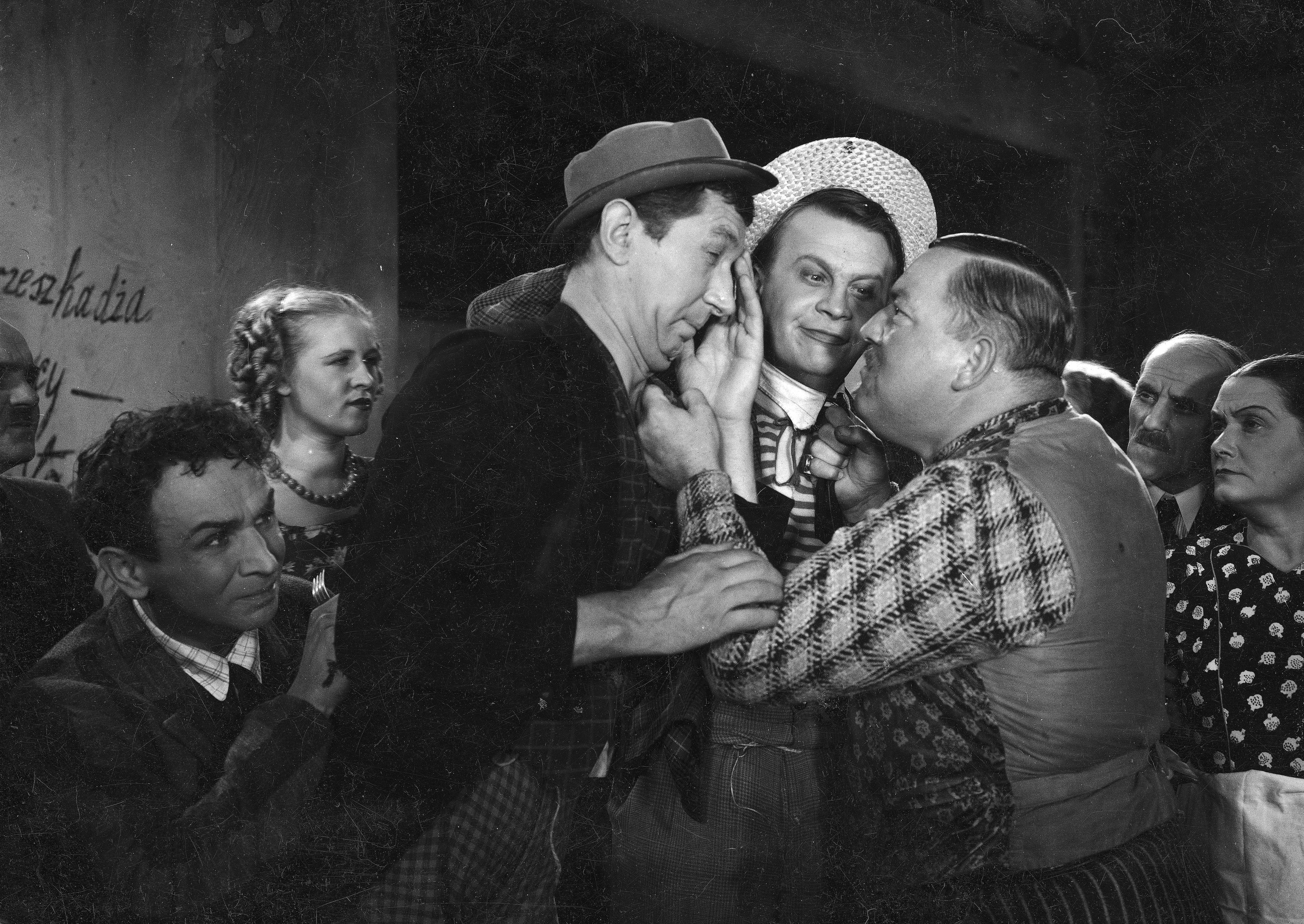
- Directed by: Henryk Szaro
- Written by: Jan Fethke; Konrad Tom
- Based on: Galganach, czyli Trójka hultajska lub zlote niedole by Jan Nestroy
- Produced by: Wladyslaw Mikosz
- Starring: Elzbieta Barszczewska; Lena Zelichowska; Jerzy Pichelski
- Cinematography: Stanislaw Lipinski
- Music by: Henry Vars
- Production company: Femika-Film
- Release date: 16 November 1937
- Running time: 84 minutes
- Country: Poland
- Language: Polish

Three Troublemakers (Polish: Trójka hultajska) is a 1937 Polish musical comedy film directed by Henryk Szaro and starring Józef Kondrat, Stanislaw Sielanski and Tamara Wiszniewska. The film's sets were designed by the art director Stefan Norris and Jacek Rotmil.

== Cast ==
- Józef Kondrat as Ignacy Wiórek, czeladnik stolarski
- Stanislaw Sielanski as Igielka, Czeladnik Krawiecki
- Stanislaw Wolinski as Szydelko, Czeladnik Szewski
- Tamara Wiszniewska as Lucia Stolarska, daughter
- Józef Orwid as Majster Stolarski
- Antoni Szczerba-Ferski as Wycior Sr., Majster Kominiarski
- Tadeusz Fijewski as Tadeusz Wycior, oldest son
- Aniela Rolandowa as Kasia, the maid
- Mela Kubanska as Basia, the waitress
- Czeslaw Skonieczny as The Innkeeper
- Ina Benita as Inez, gold-digger
- Wladyslaw Grabowski as Ryszard Farfacki, sugar-daddy
- Zofia Ordynska as Maria Stolarska
- Irena Skwierczynska as Ignacy's Aunt - Carousel Owner
- Helena Zarembina as The Aunt's Friend
- Ludwik Sempolinski as Rymek, poet
- Wincenty Loskot as Majster Krawiecki
- Leon Luszczewski as Duke
- Janusz Srebrzycki as Secretary

== Bibliography ==
- Haltof, Marek. Historical Dictionary of Polish Cinema. Rowman & Littlefield Publishers, 2015.
- Skaff, Sheila. The Law of the Looking Glass: Cinema in Poland, 1896-1939. Ohio University Press, 2008.
