= His Excellency, The Shop Assistant =

1933 Polish film

Jego ekscelencja subiekt
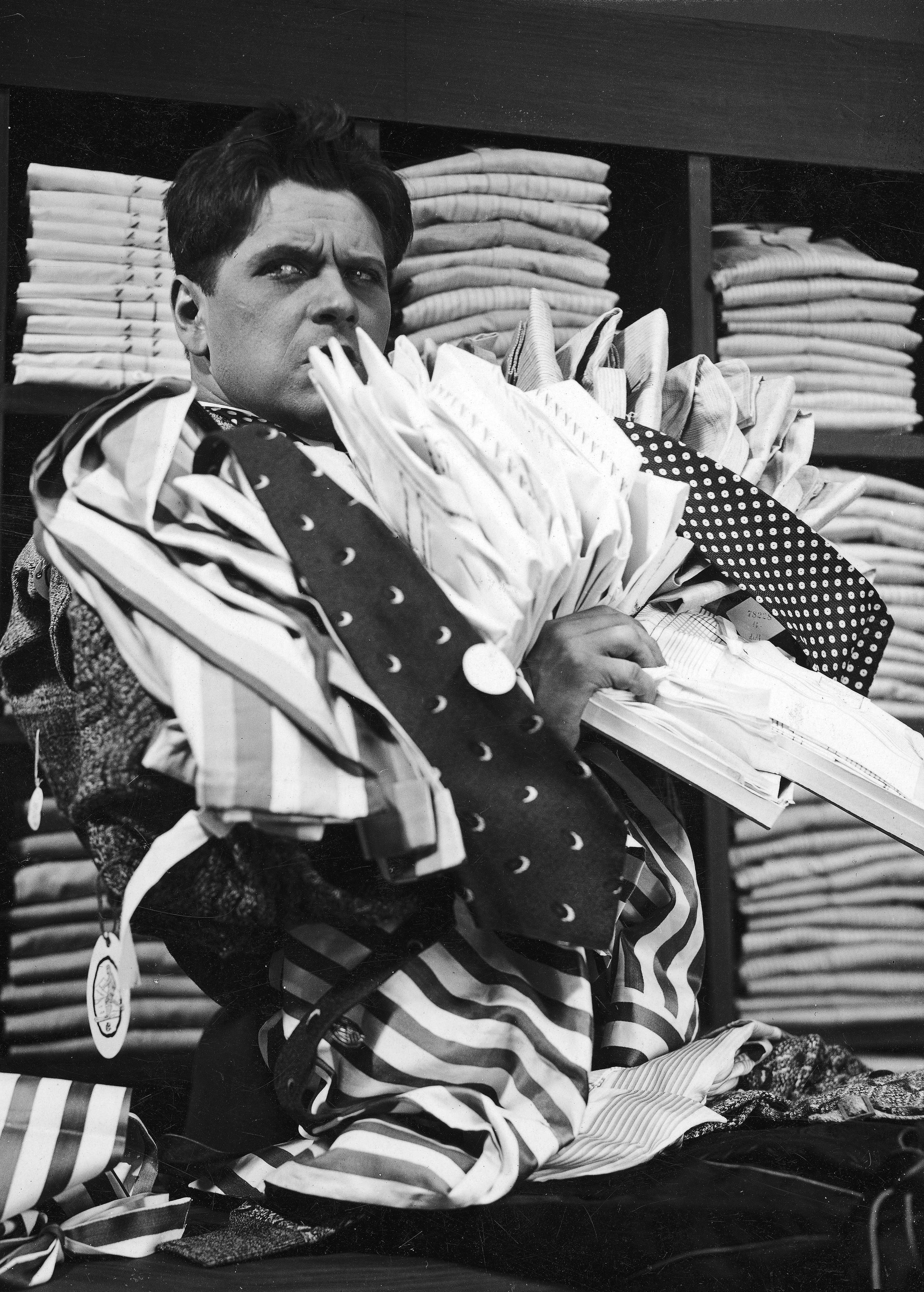
- Directed by: Michał Waszyński
- Written by: Konrad Tom
- Release date: 7 April 1933
- Country: Poland
- Language: Polish

His Excellency, The Shop Assistant (Polish: Jego ekscelencja subiekt) is a 1933 Polish romantic comedy film directed by Michał Waszyński.

== About the movie ==
The title role was played by Eugeniusz Bodo, the leading lover of pre-war Polish cinematography. The songs "Tyle miłości" and "Złociste włos" come from the film. The film was shot during the Great Depression, to which references were found in the film.

The photos were taken in Warsaw ( Bogusław Herse Fashion House at Marszałkowska Street, Café Adria at Moniuszki Street, Krakowskie Przedmieście Street, Traugutta Street, Kolonia Staszica and Kolonia Lubeckiego in Ochota ).

The subtitles in the film are in the form from before the Polish spelling reform of 1936.

== Plot ==
Jerzy is an adored sales assistant at the exclusive Bogusław Herse Fashion House in Warsaw. With New Year's Eve approaching, Jurek "borrows" an evening outfit (a tailcoat) from a shop mannequin at work and heads out into the city. He accidentally helps a woman who has fallen in the street and ends up accompanying her to a New Year's Eve ball for the upper classes at the Porecki residence. A series of funny misunderstandings lead to the guests mistaking him for the well-known and highly respected counselor Chełmoński. Jurek does not correct this mistake because he is busy courting the hosts' daughter, Ania. The young couple quickly fall in love.

The clerk continues to pretend to be an "excellency" until he realizes that his and Miss Porecka's love has no future. It turns out that Ania's parents intend to marry her off to a so-called good match—someone with high social and financial status. The Poreckis are in a dire financial situation and hope that their daughter's wealthy marriage will save them. The lovers are forced to part ways, but a series of coincidences and Jurek's determination cause their fate to take an unexpected turn. Ania's future husband, Kracht, turns out to be a conman who is only interested in her dowry. A confrontation ensues, during which Jurek teaches Kracht a lesson. In the end, Ania and Jurek stay together, and the manager of the fashion house promises Jurek a salary five times higher.

== Cast ==
- Eugeniusz Bodo ... Jurek Czermoński, the shop assistant
- Konrad Tom ... Mr. Porecki
- Mieczysława Ćwiklińska ... Mrs. Idalia Porecka
- Ina Benita ... Ania Porecka
- Wiktor Biegański ... Warehouse Director
- Andrzej Bogucki
- Helena Buczyńska
- Zygmunt Chmielewski ... Kracht
- Feliks Chmurkowski
- Ewa Erwicz
- Ludwik Fritsche... The Valet
- Zofia Kajzerówna
- Henryk Rzętkowski
- Irena Skwierczyńska ... Acting Director
- Zofia Ślaska
- Stefan Szczuka
- Alina Żeliska
