= Neighbors (1937 film) =

1937 Polish film

- Piętro wyżej
- Directed by: Leon Trystan
- Written by: Emanuel Schlechter; Ludwik Starski; Eugeniusz Bodo
- Starring: Eugeniusz Bodo; Józef Orwid; Helena Grossówna; Ludwik Sempoliński
- Cinematography: Seweryn Steinwurzel
- Music by: Henryk Wars
- Production company: Urania-Film
- Release date: February 18, 1937
- Running time: 84 minutes
- Country: Poland
- Language: Polish

Neighbors (Polish: Piętro wyżej) is a 1937 Polish musical romantic comedy film directed by Leon Trystan and starring Eugeniusz Bodo, Józef Orwid and Helena Grossówna. Its plot follows two neighbors who, although unrelated, happen to have the same last name (Henryk and Hipolit Pączek) and are complete opposites of each other. Complications arise when the niece of the older, Hipolit Pompek arrives for a visit and gets into Henryk's apartment who immediately falls for her.

The film was awarded the main prize at the Polish Film Festival in Lviv in 1938. In September Piętro wyżej was dubbed into Yiddish and released in December of that year under the title Shkheynim in New York. Famous Polish-Jewish actor Menasze Oppenheim starred in the lead role. Neighbors is one of the most popular Polish pre-war films. Heavily inspired by pre-Code motion pictures, the film is noted for the first ever on-screen depiction of a drag queen in Polish cinema.

== Synopsis ==
The film tells the story of two neighbors in a tenement house at 13 Szczęśliwa Street: the older Hipolit Pączek (who lives below) and the younger Henryk Pączek (a tenant living one floor above). Apart from their last names, they have almost nothing in common. The former is a classical music lover, while the latter is a well-known radio announcer and jazzman. They wage constant war with each other, as the owner of the tenement cannot remove the troublesome tenant. The situation is further complicated by the arrival of Hipolit's young relative named Lodzia, with whom (with reciprocity) Henryk falls in love.

In addition to situational comedy and witty dialogues, the success of the film was also ensured by songs performed by Eugeniusz Bodo, that all turned out to be hits.

== Cast ==
- Eugeniusz Bodo - Henryk Pączek (Note: Yiddish version: "Pompek")
- Jozef Orwid - Hipolit Pączek
- Helena Grossówna - Lodzia
- Ludwik Sempoliński - Kulka-Kulkiewicz
- Stanisław Woliński - Protazy
- Czesław Skonieczny - Damazy
- Alina Zeliska - Alicja Bonecka
- Feliks Chmurkowski - Stefan Bonecki
- Julian Krzewinski - director of Polish Radio
- Ludwik Perski - musician
- Stefan Laskowski - musician
- Wincenty Łoskot - musician
- Mieczyslaw Bil-Bilażewski - announcer at the masked ball
- Aleksander Suchcicki - radio employee

== Production ==
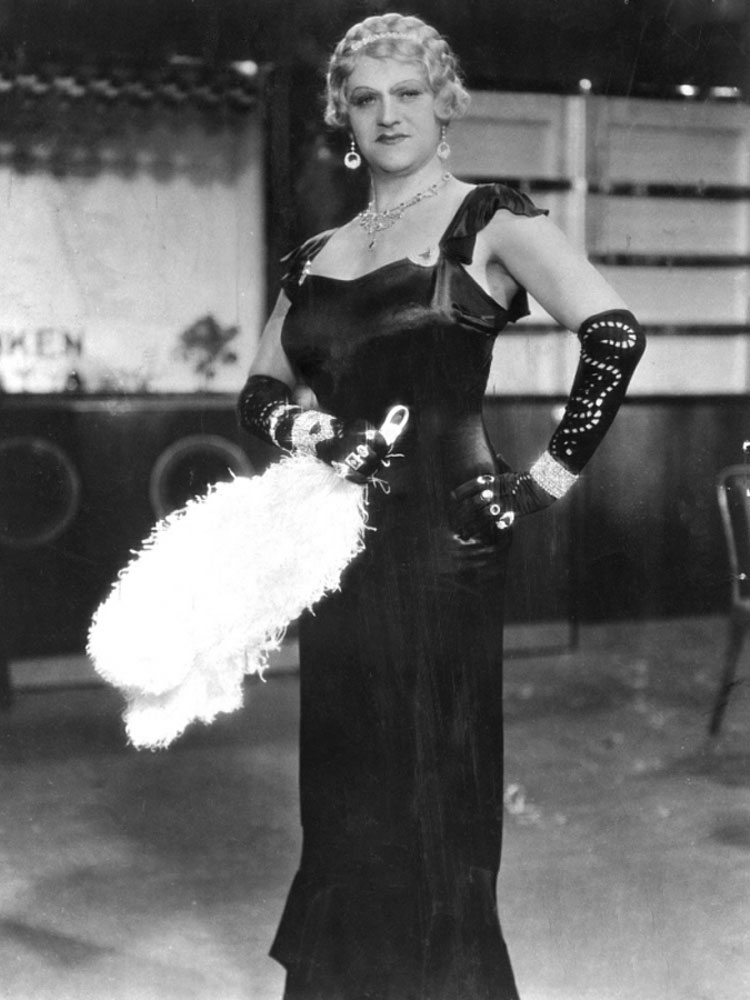
Eugeniusz Bodo as actress Mae West

Neighbors was produced by the studio Urania-Film under the direction of Witold Dybowski. The direction of the film was assigned to Leon Trystan, while the script for it was written by Emanuel Schlechter, Ludwik Starski and the film's star – Eugeniusz Bodo. The latter also took artistic direction of the film. Seweryn Steinwurzel was responsible for the film's cinematography.

=== Music ===
The score for the film and its songs were composed by Henryk Wars, with Schlechter writing the words. Three songs appeared in Neighbors in total:

- "Dziś ta i jutro ta" (foxtrot)
- "Sex appeal" (foxtrot)
- "Umówiłem się z nią na dziewiątą" (tango)

== Reception ==
In the trade weekly illustrated magazine Kino, there was a positive review of Neighbors: "...at last a very good Polish film comedy (...) a step up in film development". A review in Nasz Przegląd praised the comedy for the fact that "the humor derived from moral motifs transforms with the development of the plot into comedy reminiscent of the Marx Brothers' [Marx] surrealist humor". On the other hand, Neighbors was heavily criticized in right-wing circles. Mieczyslaw Hoszowski wrote the following about the film:

They found people who showed shamelessness on the screen to the masses and made them believe it was the height of artistry. Then they defined stupidity as humor, wit or comedy, and the uncritical masses went along with it because it suited their low instincts. Combining both, they created a revue film and a film comedy, and with the help of appropriate advertising, they won over not only the masses, but also - "the intelligentsia".

Also, the reviewer of the right-wing Prosto z mostu A. Mikulowski expressed disapproval of the Mae West parody scene: when "Bodo appears dressed as a woman, arousing the enthusiasm of the less picky audience, then the hands folded in applause fall down". An anonymous review in Gazeta Polska stated: "The film as a whole is banal. The interiors are thoroughly unsightly. [...]. The unfortunate idea with a radio speaker dressed as Mae West sinks seriously into vulgarity".

Years later, Neighbors was reviewed favorably. Paula Apanowicz of the Oldcamera.pl portal stated that Trystan's film was "a journey into a distant era - an encounter with a laughing interwar, feeling on the back of one's neck the cool breath of the catastrophe that was about to happen in a moment". Lukasz Budnik of Film.org.pl emphasized that Neighbors is "one of the most valuable films of that time [the interwar period], considered by many today to be the best"

== Bibliography ==
- Hoberman, J. (1991). Bridge of Light: Yiddish Film Between Two Worlds. Museum of Modern Art. ISBN 0805241078.
- Paula Apanowicz: "Neighbors" - An unforgettable comedy of pre-war Poland. OldCamera.pl, 2020-04-20 [accessed 2020-11-18]. (Polish).
- Łukasz Budnik: Neighbors. 80 years since the premiere. Film.org.pl, 2017-02-18. [Accessed 2020-11-18].
- Marek Hendrykowski. Around the definition of film parody. "Images. The International Journal of European Film, Performing Arts and Audiovisual Communication." 14 (23), pp. 29–38, 2014. ISSN 1731-450X
- Sebastian Jagielski. Queer theory and Polish cinema. "Cultural Studies Review." 13 (3), pp. 256–272, 2012. ISSN 1895-975X
- Iwona Kurz: Leprechaun or qui pro quo, or the body in the film culture of the interwar period. In: The body and sexuality in Polish cinema. Sebastian Jagielski, Agnieszka Morstin-Popławska (eds.). Kraków: Jagiellonian University Publishing House, 2009, pp. 13–23. ISBN 978-83-233-2642-7
- Arkadiusz Lewicki. Transgender/transvestitism/cross-dressing in Polish cinema. "Journalism and Media." 11, pp. 49–56, 2020. doi:10.19195/2082-8322.11.5 ISSN 2082-8322. [accessed 2020-12-30].
- Film reviews, "Our Review" (63), 1937, p. 6.
- Wandering through the cinemas. "The Apartment Above," "Gazeta Polska" (66), 1937, p. 13.
