= Paweł i Gaweł =

1938 film

Pawel i Gawel is a 1938 Polish comedy film directed by Mieczysław Krawicz and produced by the Rex-Film studio.

== Cast ==
- Eugeniusz Bodo as Paweł Gawlicki
- Adolf Dymsza as Gaweł Pawlicki
- Helena Grossówna as Violetta Bellami
- Józef Orwid as Hubert, her manager
- Halina Doree as Amelcia, landlady's daughter
- Zofia Mellerowicz as Landlady
- Tadeusz Fijewski as Stefek
- Karol Dorwski as Reporter Lisek
- Roman Dereń as The Editor
- Irena Skwierczyńska as Gypsy Palmreader
- Michał Halicz as Gypsy
- Sergius Kwiek as Gypsy Leader
- Zespół Cygański Kwieków as Gypsy Dancers and Musicians
