= Dodek na froncie =

- Directed by: Michał Waszyński
- Written by: Jan Fethke, Napoleon Sadek
- Release date: 29 March 1936
- Running time: 82 minutes
- Country: Poland
- Language: Polish

Dodek na froncie is a 1936 Polish comedy film directed by Michał Waszyński.

== Cast ==
- Adolf Dymsza ... Dodek Wedzonka
- Alicja Halama ... Zofia Majewska
- Mieczysław Cybulski ... Lt. Jerzy Majewski
- Helena Grossówna ... Zuzia, the maid
- Michał Znicz ... Lt. Duszkin
- Józef Orwid ... Col. Józef Pulkovnik
- Mieczysława Ćwiklińska ... Putkovnikova
- Władysław Grabowski ... Grand Duke Vladimir Pavtovich
- Waclaw Zdanowicz ... Russian Captain
- Stefan Hnydziński ... Ordonnanz
- Chór Dana ... Russian soldiers chorus
- Chór Cyganski Sieminowa ... Gypsy chorus
- Alla Bayanova ... Gypsy singer (episode)
