= Adolf Dymsza =

Polish comedy actor

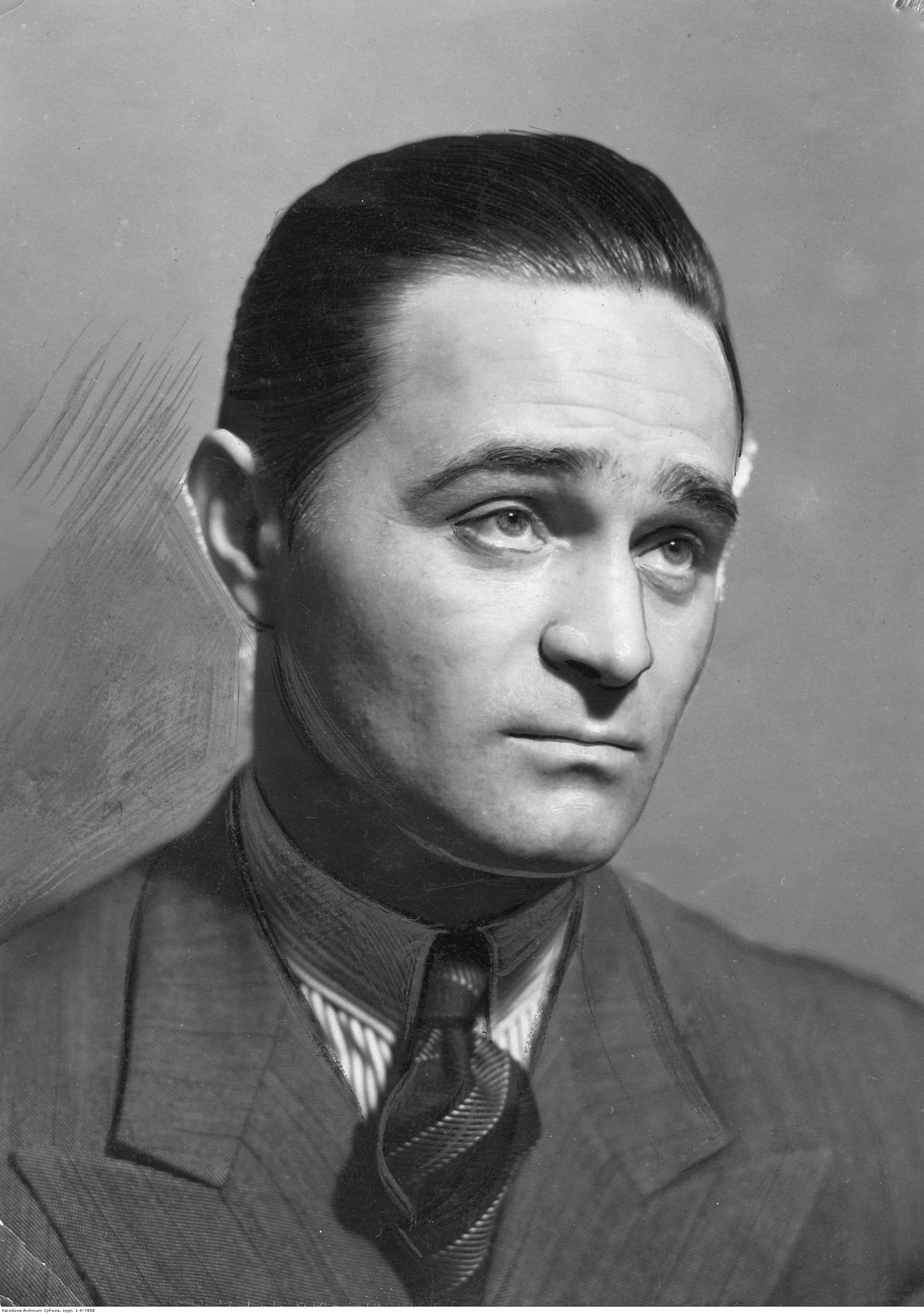
- Adolf Dymsza in 1933 film Dvanáct křesel
- Born: Adolf Bagiński; 7 April 1900; Warsaw, Poland
- Died: 20 August 1975 (aged 75); Góra Kalwaria, Poland

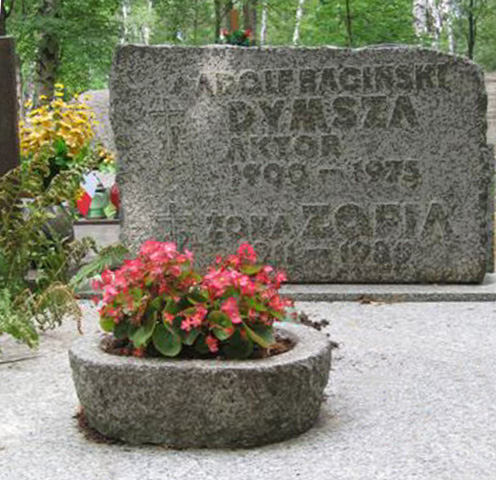
Adolf Dymsza monument at Powązki Cemetery

Adolf Dymsza (born Adolf Bagiński; 7 April 1900 – 20 August 1975) was a Polish comedy actor of both the pre-World War II and post-war eras. He starred in both theatre and film productions, mainly before World War II. He and Kazimierz Krukowski performed as the duo Lopek and Florek in kleynkunst productions at Qui Pro Quo and other noted Warsaw cabarets. Another pseudonym was "Dodek." He was arguably the most popular Polish comic actor of the 1930s, Andrzej Wajda remarked once, that for him Dymsza and Eugeniusz Bodo were symbols of pre-war Polish cinema in general. To this day he is considered the king of Polish film comedy.

== Life ==
Dymsza was born Adolf Bagiński on 7 April 1900 in Warsaw, then in Russian Empire, to Adolf Sr. and Matylda née Połądkiewicz. At the age of 15 he worked as a busboy in some of Warsaw's cabarets. He graduated from a local II Gymnasium and then studied at the Hipolit Wawelberg's Trade School. During World War I and the subsequent Polish-Bolshevik War he started his career as a dancer in cabarets and theatres of Warsaw, Minsk and Grodno. He returned to Warsaw after the war, but no theatre would hire him and he spent several years giving dance lessons and occasionally singing in cabarets. It is speculated that he might have appeared in a number of silent films in that period, none of them survive to our times however.

His debut came in 1925, when he was hired by the famous Qui Pro Quo cabaret as a singer and dancer, "immediately conquering the audience with his natural juvenile wit and temperamental performances of Warsaw street types." He remained part of Qui Pro Quo's crew until 1931, appearing on stage along such stars of contemporary Polish cabaret and cinema as Marian Hemar, Eugeniusz Bodo, Hanka Ordonówna, Mieczysław Fogg, Mira Zimińska, Zula Pogorzelska and Fryderyk Jarosy.

Initially rarely seen on screen, Dymsza first made a name for himself as an excellent comedian in Warsaw's cabarets in the 1920s. In 1930 he starred in the first of his films: the Wiatr od morza and Niebezpieczny romans. Altogether, in the inter-war period, Dymsza appeared in 24 feature sound films, acting the leads for the most part. Many of them were cheap comedies and farces, replete with songs and music and a few excellent actors such as Adolf Dymsza. Modern critics consider some of those films remarkable only because of the performance of Dymsza. A popular actor in film comedies, he recorded very few of the great hits from his cabaret and film performances.

After the German and Soviet invasions of Poland, Dymsza ignored the Polish actors' boycott and worked in the Nazi-administered cabarets of Warsaw.

"Yet, after 1945 when Second World War was over, his disloyal attitude to the patriotic attitude was quickly forgotten by Polish fans of his talent. Perhaps, need to laugh again was strong enough in the society so deeply traumatised by the atrocities of war, and Dymsza's talent in evoking happy-go-lucky air of the past Warsaw street was highly desirable. Also, rather proletaryan style of his roles was a helpful circumstance in revival of his career in a postwar communist Poland. After few years of being banned from public performing in Warsaw, in 1951 Dymsza was back on stage of the Warsaw comedy theatre "Syrena" and in the movies."

After the war it was revealed that Dymsza helped to save several Poles from hands of Gestapo, helped Jews in the Warsaw Ghetto and hid a Jewish performance artist in his apartment, Mieczysław L. Kittay, despite the threat of death penalty for harboring a Jew.

In 1958, he toured the United States and Canada with Kabaret Wagabunda.

Late in his years he retired to a care house in Góra Kalwaria, where he died on 20 August 1975. He is buried at Warsaw's Powązki Cemetery.

In 2013 the Polish Post issued a commemorative stamp of him, with Helena Grossówna and Mieczysława Ćwiklińska.

== Selected filmography ==
- 1929 – Police Chief Tagiejew
- 1930 – Wiatr od morza (as Stefek)
- 1930 – Niebezpieczny romans
- 1932 – Sto metrów miłości (as Dodek)
- 1933 – Romeo i Julcia (as Teofil Rączka)
- 1933 – Każdemu wolno kochać (as Hipek)
- 1933 – Dwanaście krzeseł (as antiquary Wladyslaw Kepka)
- 1935 – Antek policmajster (as Antek Król)
- 1935 – ABC miłości
- 1935 – Wacuś (as Wacuś, Tadeusz)
- 1936 – Dodek na froncie (as Dodek)
- 1937 – Niedorajda (as Florek)
- 1938 – Robert and Bertram (as Robert)
- 1938 – Paweł i Gaweł (as Gaweł)
- 1939 – A Sportsman Against His Will (as Dodek Czwartek)
- 1948 – Skarb (as Alfred Ziółko)
- 1953 – Sprawa do załatwienia (in eight different roles)
- 1955 – Irena do domu! (as Zygmunt Majewski)
- 1956 – Nikodem Dyzma (as Nikodem Dyzma) based on The Career of Nicodemus Dyzma
- 1959 – Cafe Pod Minogą (as Maniuś Kitajec)
- 1962 – Mój stary (as Grzela)
- 1969 – Sól ziemi czarnej (as Ordynans)
- 1970 – Pan Dodek (as Dodek)
