= Irena Skwierczyńska =

Polish actress (1897–1984)

- Born: 26 April 1897; Warsaw, Poland, Russian Empire (now Warsaw, Poland)
- Died: 15 May 1984 (aged 87); Warsaw, Poland
- Occupation: Actress
- Years active: 1933-1971

Irena Skwierczyńska (26 April 1897 – 15 May 1984) was a Polish film actress. She appeared in more than 25 films between 1933 and 1971.

== Selected filmography ==
- His Excellency, The Shop Assistant (1933)
- Prokurator Alicja Horn (1933)
- Uhlan's Pledge (1934)
- Wacuś (1935)
- Granny Had No Worries (1935)
- Będzie lepiej (1936)
- 30 karatów szczęścia (1936)
- Niedorajda (1937)
- Three Troublemakers (1937)
- Rena (1938)
- Paweł i Gaweł (1938)
- At the End of the Road (1939)
