= The Doctor's Secret =

The Doctor's Secret may refer to:

== Film ==
- The Doctor's Secret (1909 film), a French silent short film
- The Doctor's Secret (1913 film), an American silent short film
- The Doctor's Secret (1929 film), an American drama film
- The Doctor's Secret (1930 film), a Swedish-language drama film
- The Doctor's Secret (1931 film), an American drama film
- The Doctor's Secret (1955 film), an Austrian drama film

== Literature ==
- The Doctor's Secret, an 1890 novel by Eliza Margaret von Booth
- "The Doctor's Secret", a 1938 short story by William J. Makin; basis for the 1939 film The Return of Doctor X
