= Klemens Mielczarek =

Polish film actor

- Born: 17 October 1920; Lublin, Poland
- Died: 2 January 2006 (aged 85); Warsaw, Poland
- Occupation: Actor
- Years active: 1935–1991

Klemens Mielczarek (17 October 1920 – 2 January 2006) was a Polish film actor. He appeared in more than 20 films between 1935 and 1991.

== Selected filmography ==
- Wacuś (1935)
- Niedorajda (1937)
