= Józef Orwid =

Polish actor

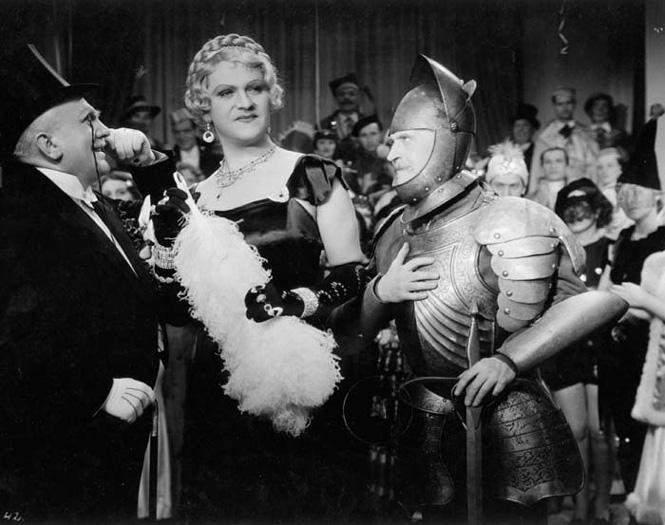
- Józef Orwid (in armor) in a scene from the film Piętro wyżej
- Born: Józef Kotschy; 14 November 1891; Besko, Austria-Hungary
- Died: 13 August 1944 (aged 52); Warsaw, Poland
- Occupation: Actor

Józef Orwid (born Józef Kotschy; 14 November 1891 – 13 August 1944) was a Polish stage and film actor. He died in the Warsaw Uprising.

== Filmography ==
- Ten Percent for Me (1933)
- Każdemu wolno kochać (1933)
- Romeo i Julcia (1933)
- Młody las (1934)
- ABC miłości (1935)
- Antek policmajster (1935)
- Manewry miłosne (1935)
- Panienka z poste restante (1935)
- Wacuś (1935)
- 30 karatów szczęścia (1936)
- Dodek na froncie (1936)
- Dwa dni w raju (1936)
- Fredek uszczęśliwia świat (1936)
- Jadzia (1936)
- Mały marynarz (1936)
- The Haunted Manor (1936)
- Wierna rzeka (1936)
- Książątko (1937)
- Niedorajda (1937)
- Pan redaktor szaleje (1937)
- Miss Minister Is Dancing (1937)
- Parada Warszawy (1937)
- Piętro wyżej (1937)
- Three Troublemakers (1937)
- Ułan księcia Józefa (1937)
- Dziewczyna szuka miłości (1938)
- Florian (1938)
- Gehenna (1938)
- Królowa przedmieścia (1938)
- Paweł i Gaweł (1938)
- Robert and Bertram (1938)
- Serce matki (1938)
- Szczęśliwa trzynastka (1938)
- Zapomniana melodia (1938)
- Ja tu rządzę (1939)
- Złota Maska (1939)
- A Sportsman Against His Will (1940)
- To Happiness Through Tears (1941)
