= Adam Aston =

American singer

- Born: Adolf Loewinsohn; 17 September 1902; Warsaw, Poland
- Died: 10 January 1993 (aged 90); London, England
- Other names: Adam Wiński, Adam Stanisław Lewinson, J. Kierski, Ben-Lew

Adam Aston (born Adolf Loewinsohn, 17 September 1902, Warsaw, Poland: died 10 January 1993 in London, England) was a Polish singer, actor, and pianist of Jewish origin. He sang in Polish, Italian, English, Hebrew and Yiddish and was one of the most popular artists in interwar Poland. He often worked with Henryk Wars. He also went under the names Adam Wiński, Adam Stanisław Lewinson, recorded also under names J. Kierski, Adam Winski and Ben-Lewi. He used the name Ben-Lewi when recording in Hebrew. He is often remembered as the fourth great male voice of the era, alongside Mieczysław Fogg, Tadeusz Faliszewski, and Eugeniusz Bodo.

== Life ==
He was born Adolf Stanisław Loewinsohn into a Jewish family. His father, Maksymilian, was a merchant, and his mother, Gustawa, was a teacher from Popielcy. Aston spent his childhood and youth in Warsaw, where he attended the Mikołaj Rej Gymnasium. There he encountered his first vocal mentor, Ludwik Heintze, a professor at the Conservatory and conductor of the school choir and orchestra. This early exposure to structured musical training shaped his vocal discipline and musical sensitivity.

In 1920, before completing secondary school, Aston volunteered for the Polish Army during the Polish Soviet War. After graduating in 1921, he enrolled in the Faculty of Law at the University of Warsaw, and graduated in 1925. He then completed a course in dentistry, only to change professions again in 1928, when he began working for the Warsaw branch of the Dutch liqueur company Hulstkamp, which had opened in Poland the year before. Initially employed in sales and distribution, Aston rose to become a controller and eventually head of procurement and director of the representative office. He remained associated with the company until September 1939, despite a 1938 article in Polski Restaurator emphasizing Hulstkamp’s purely Christian and Catholic character, an ironic detail given Aston’s Jewish origins.

Despite his business career, Aston’s true passion was always music. He made his first recordings around 1927, likely for the Beka label, and from 1927 to 1929 undertook private vocal lessons with Wacław Brzeziński, the renowned teacher of Jan Kiepura. Aston aspired to become an opera singer, studied conducting, possessed absolute pitch, and was an accomplished pianist. By the end of the 1920s, he had already gained a reputation as a self made musician of exceptional musicality.

His artistic breakthrough came in 1930, when composer and bandleader Henryk Wars founded Chór Warsa, inspired by the popularity of male vocal ensembles such as Chór Dana and American groups like the Mills Brothers. Aston was invited to join the ensemble alongside Tadeusz Faliszewski and Stefan Sas Jaworski, with a fifth member variously identified as Aleksander Puchalski or Bolesław Reiff. The group quickly gained prominence, recording forty two dance pieces for Syrena Electro between 1930 and 1933. When they began recording for Columbia, Wars renamed the ensemble Weseli Chłopcy z Columbii.

The group became known for refined and harmonized interpretations of popular songs such as Barbara, Już taki jestem zimny drań, and Miłość ci wszystko wybaczy, as well as for film recordings including music for Szyb L 23, shown at Warsaw’s Apollo Cinema. Critics praised the ensemble’s vocal cohesion and Wars’s understated piano accompaniments. Their success opened the doors for Aston to appear at the prestigious Morskie Oko revue theater, exposing him to large Warsaw audiences hungry for modern popular music.

Among the ensemble’s members, Aston stood out most distinctly. His warm and velvety baritone quickly marked him as an individual star, prompting Wars to suggest a stage name derived from the phrase as tonu, meaning ace of tone. The pseudonym Adam Aston was formally adopted in 1935. Tango became his signature genre, a style that had swept Poland in the years following independence in 1918. In 1932, Aston recorded the deeply moving tango Czemuś o mnie zapomniał, with music by Szymon Kataszek, a pioneer of Polish jazz. The song cemented his reputation as the supreme interpreter of sentimental and emotionally charged tangos.

By 1933, Aston was recording hit after hit, including To płacze serce, Tylko Ty, and Jesienne róże. Alongside his ensemble work, he began recording independently, laying the groundwork for a solo career. He collaborated with leading composers and lyricists of the era, recording the foxtrot Katiusza, also known as To lubią Sowiety, with music by Zygmunt Białostocki and lyrics by Andrzej Włast, as well as the waltz Bajki to words by Julian Tuwim. He later sang the waltzes Opium and Morfina, both dark and sensual explorations of obsessive love and emotional intoxication.

Aston occasionally collaborated with other leading vocalists, including Faliszewski, with whom he recorded the tango Znakiem tego in 1936. His voice became ubiquitous in Polish popular culture. He recorded commercial jingles, appeared in advertisements, and sang for radio and film. He performed and conducted in Dwie Joasie in 1935 alongside Jadwiga Smosarska, appeared as a gypsy singer in Manewry miłosne, and sang the Polish version of Cheek to Cheek titled W siódmym niebie in Top Hat. He also recorded in French and Hebrew, including a Hebrew version of To ostatnia niedziela titled To Ostatni Szabas, under the pseudonym Ben Lewi.

Between 1930 and 1939, Aston is estimated to have recorded approximately nine hundred and sixty sides for labels including Syrena Electro, Odeon, Parlophon, Lonora Electro, and Columbia, sometimes under aliases such as Adam Wiński or Jerzy Kierski. Known personally as warm and charming, and free of professional jealousy, he was widely respected within artistic circles. In 1935, he married the actress Lucyna Nowikow.

The outbreak of war in September 1939 shattered his flourishing career. Aston was evacuated with Polish Radio staff to Lwów, where he joined Henryk Wars’s Tea Jazz Orchestra, which toured the Soviet Union under official tolerance. After Germany invaded the Soviet Union in 1941, the ensemble dissolved, and Aston and his wife fled to Frunze in Kyrgyzstan, where they nearly died of starvation. They were saved by a pre war colleague, Ryszard Frank, also known as Henryk Szprycer, who was then active in a military orchestra.

Following the Sikorski Mayski Agreement, Aston joined the Polish Second Corps under General Władysław Anders. He served both as a soldier and as a performer with the Polish Army Theatre founded by Feliks Konarski, traveling through Iran, Palestine, Egypt, and Italy. He appeared on Polish Radio in Cairo and took part in the Battle of Monte Cassino. One of his most famous performances came later, when he sang Czerwone maki na Monte Cassino for BBC radio, concluding with a verse in Italian, and later performed it in Michał Waszyński’s film Wielka Droga. He also recorded the English language song Warsaw Melody, expressing longing for his destroyed hometown.

After demobilization, Aston settled briefly in London before emigrating to South Africa, where he worked again in the alcohol industry and later managed a paper factory in Johannesburg, while continuing occasional performances for Polish audiences. In 1953, Billboard magazine noted reissues of his pre war recordings, though they were often misunderstood as new releases.

After suffering a heart attack in 1959, Aston retired and returned permanently to London. He performed occasionally at the Polish Theatre Polonia, became a member of ZASP, and visited Poland in the mid 1960s to record for Polish Radio and give interviews. Thereafter, he largely withdrew from public life, and like many interwar stars, gradually faded into obscurity as musical tastes changed.

Adam Aston died in London in 1993 at the age of ninety, with a funeral of 600 attendees. His wife survived him by nine years. Despite his immense contribution to Polish musical culture, his resting place at Golders Green Crematorium bears no monument or plaque. All that remains are fading flowers, an echo of the line he once sang, Jesienne róże więdną już.
