= Ludwik Starski =

Polish Jewish writer and sound engineer

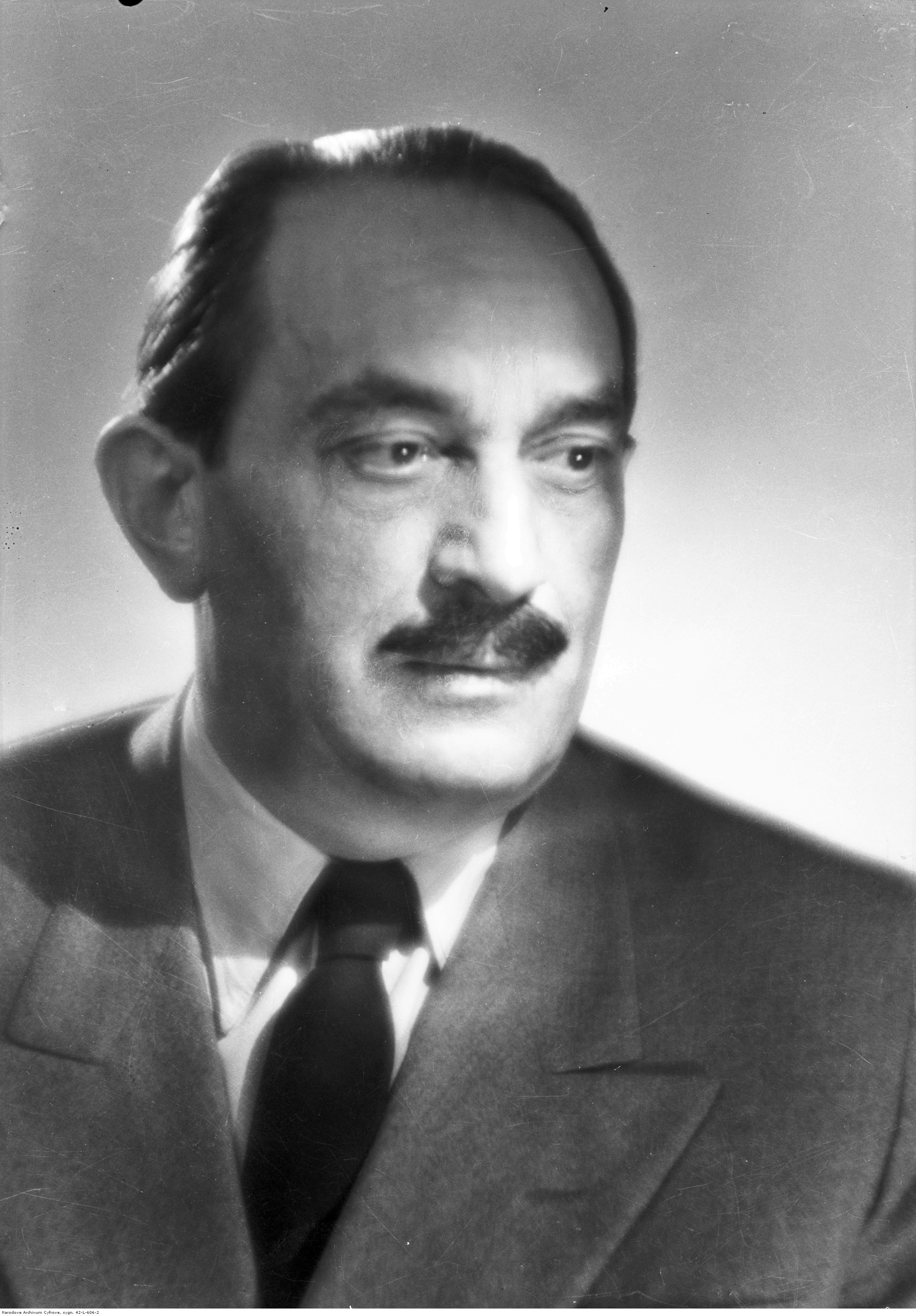
Ludwik Starski

Ludwik Starski (born Ludwik Kałuszyner, 1 March 1903 in Łódź – died 29 February 1984 in Warsaw) was a Polish Jewish lyricist, sound engineer and screenwriter of the twentieth century. He was the father of the set designer Allan Starski, who often worked with movie director Andrzej Wajda and received the Academy Award for "Best Set Design" for Schindler's List in 1994. Ludwik worked with Eugeniusz Bodo, Władysław Szpilman and with Tadeusz Sygietyński.

Before the Second World War he was a journalist with the newspaper Express Wieczorny Ilustrowany (The Evening Express). He was also a lyricist of songs for cabarets, cafés and theater, including theater Qui Pro Quo, Gong, Morskie Oko, Perskie Oko, in Warsaw. Some of his songs were performed by singer Irena Santor to the music of composer Władysław Szpilman. Starski worked with singer actor Eugeniusz Bodo (whom he met at Qui Pro Quo) and wrote lyrics to some of his hit songs including Sex Appeal.

Between 1934 and 1978, he wrote a score of films for which he was also an engineer.

He married Maria Bargielska (1911–1986); they had one son, Allan Starski, who became an Academy Award winning production designer and set decorator. Ludwik Starski was the brother of journalist and writer Adam Ochocki.

== Selected filmography ==
- Robert and Bertram (1938)
- A Sportsman Against His Will (1940)
