= Antoni Fertner =

Polish actor

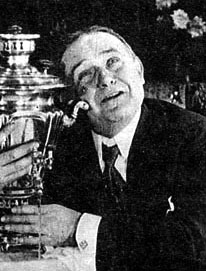
- Antoni Fertner, 1916
- Born: 23 May 1874; Częstochowa
- Died: 16 April 1959 (aged 84); Kraków, Poland
- Occupation: Polish actor

Antoni Fertner (23 May 1874 – 16 April 1959) was a Polish stage actor (graduated from drama school in 1895) and one of the earliest Polish film actors. His first film, Antoś pierwszy raz w Warszawie (Antoś for the First Time in Warsaw) premiered October 22, 1908. It is the earliest surviving Polish feature film and considered to be the founding date of Polish Film. He is considered to be the first recognizable star of Polish Cinema. His favorite brand of comedy was farce, which with the help of musical comedy revived his career in the 1930s.

Besides his film and stage career, his favorite hobby was bicycling.

== Early career ==
Antoni Fertner had a prominent stage career before film, performing in many theaters and cabaret's.

His first film was Antoś for the First Time in Warsaw (Antoś pierwszy raz w Warszawie). While visiting Warsaw from Moscow to Paris, Joseph Meyer and Ferner produced this short comedy. Fertner commissioned and starred in the film. It premiered October 22, 1908 at the Oaza Cinema, a theater which he co-owned, to a full house of 180 people.

Ferner's talent was noticed from the beginning and he was one of the most successful film professionals of the time.

He formed a production company with fellow actors, Julian Krzewiński, Wincenty Rapacki, Juliusz Zagrodzki and cameraman, Stanislaw Sebel. They specialized in comedy featuring films starring Fertner.

== Move to Moscow ==
After fleeing to Moscow, Russia during World War I, he signed with the Russian Lucifer Company in 1915. This led to the creation of Antosha (Tony in Russian) and the Antosha series. His character has been compared to France's Max Linder and America's Sidney Drew. He starred in 24 films as Antosha, however, as most pre-revolution Russian films, many from the series are gone.

He appeared in over 30 Russians films earning the nickname “the Russian Max Linder.”

== Return to Poland ==
After the Bolshevik takeover, Fertner returned to Poland. He appeared in only 2 films in the 1920s. However, the popularity of musical comedy mixed with his forte, farce comedy, he revived his career. During the 1930s, he appeared in over 15 films, including many important classic Polish musical comedies such as Ada! Don't Do That (1936) and The Forgotten Melody (1938).

After World War II, he performed in numerous Kraków theatre's. However, he would never appear in any postwar films. His last film appearance is The Vagabonds (1939).

== Filmography ==
- Antoś in Warsaw for the First Time (1908)
- Antek Klawisz, Hero of the Vistula (1911)
- Antosha Ruined by a Corset (1916)
- The Slave of Love (1923)
- Rivals (1925)
- Romeo and Juliet (1933)
- Jaśnie pan szofer (1935)
- Police Chief Antek (1935)
- Rivals (1935)
- Little Sailor (1936)
- Fred Makes the World a Better Place (1936)
- Two Days in Paradise (1936)
- Ada, Don't Do That! (1936)
- Daddy Gets Married (1936)
- Będzie lepiej (1936)
- Bolek i Lolek (1936)
- My Editor is Going Crazy (1937)
- The Little Prince (1937)
- The Forgotten Melody (1938)
- Gehenna (1938)
- Robert and Bertram (1938)
- The Vagabonds (1939)

== Bibliography ==
- Bert. (1938, Jun 29). Pictures: Film reviews - pan redaktor szaleje. Variety (Archive: 1905-2000), 131, 26
- Galea, Roberto. “Polish Cinema of the Silent Film Era.” Culture.pl, June 2012
- Haltof, Marek. Polish National Cinema. New York: Berghahn Books, 2002.
- Haltof, Marek. Historical Dictionary of Polish Cinema. Lanham, Md.: Scarecrow Press, 2007
- Kramer, Fritzi. “Antosha Ruined by a Corset (1916) A Silent Film Review.” Movies Silently, Movies Silently, 26 June 2018.
- Shan. (1936, Dec 16). Film reviews: BOLEK AND LOLEK. Variety (Archive: 1905-2000), 125, 21
- Skaff, Sheila. The Law of the Looking Glass: Cinema in Poland, 1896–1939. Ohio University Press, 2008
- Wear. (1938, Jan 12). Pictures: Film reviews - KSIAZATKO. Variety (Archive: 1905-2000), 129, 27
