= Eugeniusz Bodo =

Polish director, actor and producer

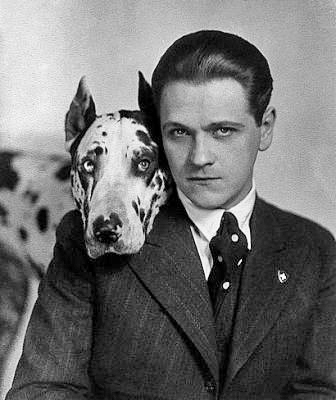
- Eugeniusz Bodo and his dog Sambo
- Born: Bohdan Eugène Junod; 28 December 1899; Geneva, Switzerland
- Died: 7 October 1943 (aged 43); Kotlas, Soviet Union
- Occupations: Actor; singer; dancer; screenwriter; film director

Eugeniusz Bodo (born Bohdan Eugène Junod; 28 December 1899 – 7 October 1943) was a film director, producer, singer, pianist and one of the most popular Polish actors and comedians of the interwar period. He starred in some of the most popular Polish film productions of the 1930s, including His Excellency, The Shop Assistant (Polish: Jego ekscelencja subiekt), Czy Lucyna to dziewczyna?, and Pieśniarz Warszawy.

A skilled singer, he became an icon of Polish musical comedy and a "symbol of Polish commercial cinema". In the late 1930s he also became a successful entrepreneur – co-owner of a successful film studio, café, and producers' company. Arrested by the Soviet NKVD in the aftermath of the German and Soviet invasion of Poland, he perished in the Soviet Gulag.

== Biography ==
Bohdan Eugène Junod was born on 28 December 1899. His birthplace is uncertain; sources name Warsaw, Łódź, and Geneva, Switzerland. His mother was Jadwiga Anna Dorota née Dylewska. His father, Teodor Junod, was a Swiss citizen who moved to Russian-held Poland and in 1903 settled in Łódź. There he opened a revue-cinema, Urania – the first permanent cinema theatre in that city. It was there that Bodo made his stage debut at the age of six.

In 1917 Junod moved to Poznań where he joined "Teatr Apollo". In 1919 (under a new stage name of Eugeniusz Bodo, the surname created from the initials of his own first name Bohdan and his mother's – Dorota) he started acting in various Warsaw-based theatres, variétés and cabarets (Qui Pro Quo, Perskie Oko and Cyrulik Warszawski being the most famous). He also played major roles in Warsaw-based "Teatr Polski" and Wilno-based "Teatr Lutnia".

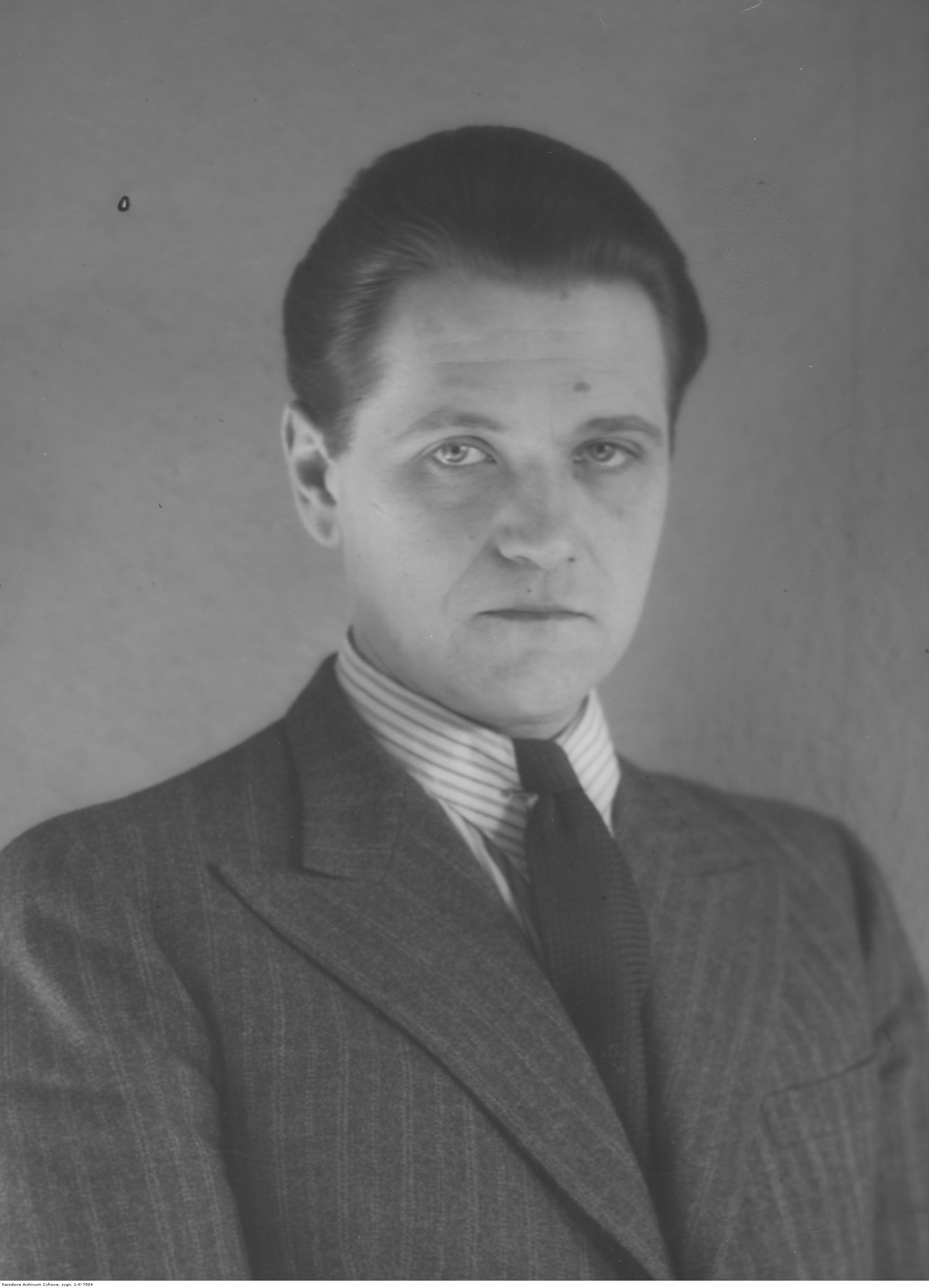
Eugeniusz Bodo in 1935

He is best known for his film roles; he played in more than thirty films. His screen debut was a 1925 silent film Rywale. With the advent of sound film Bodo in a matter of years became one of the best-known Polish actors. Usually appearing in musical comedies, already in 1932 he was voted the King of Polish Actors by Film magazine's readers. His popularity rose following three mistaken identity comedies: 1933 His Excellency, The Shop Assistant, 1935 His Excellency, the Chauffeur (both directed by Michał Waszyński and co-starring Ina Benita) and 1934 Czy Lucyna to dziewczyna? (co-starring Jadwiga Smosarska). Always appearing well-dressed, in 1936 Bodo was awarded the title of King of Style by the readers of Film magazine.

In 1931 Bodo became a co-founder of the B.W.B. film studio, and, in 1933, he opened a private producers' company "Urania", named after his fathers' cinema in Łódź. His best-known film was Neighbors (Piętro wyżej) (1937), which he wrote and produced himself. On 10 January 1939 Bodo with his business partner Zygmunt Woyciechowski opened a restaurant and a café – the "Café Bodo" – at Warsaw's prestigious Pierackiego street (modern Foksal). By that time his popularity reached far beyond the borders of Poland, to the extent that Yugoslavian press dubbed him Polish Maurice Chevalier. Bodo himself toured Germany promoting Polish-made feature films on that market.

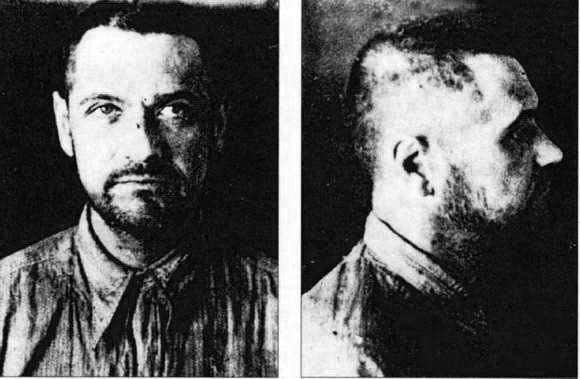
Eugeniusz Bodo after arrest by NKVD. Last photo

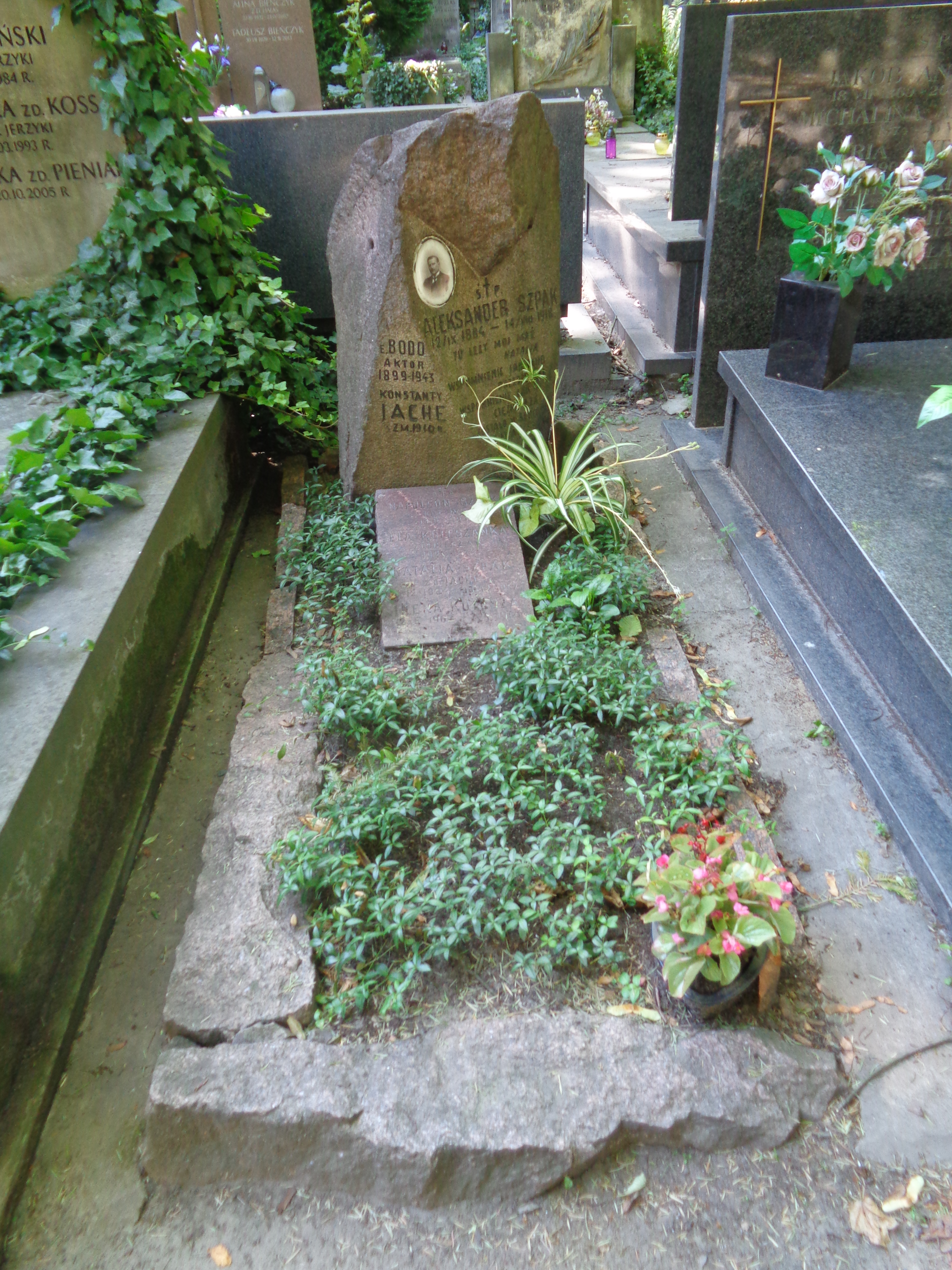
The symbolic grave of Eugeniusz Bodo at the Powązki Cemetery in Warsaw.

During the invasion of Poland he organized recitals for the Polish soldiers and civilians during the Siege of Warsaw. He then fled to Lwów, where he joined the Tea-Jazz band led by Henryk Wars. With that troupe he toured the Soviet Union in 1940, he also published a record containing Russian-language versions of his songs. Simultaneously he started efforts to leave the Soviet Union using his Swiss passport. However, shortly after the German invasion of the Soviet Union he was arrested by the NKVD and sentenced to 5 years of lager/labor camp as a result of NKVD Interrogation carried out by NKVD chief Pyotr Fedotov signed on 20 October 1942 (source: documents sent to Poland by the Russian Red Cross in 1992). Initially imprisoned in Butyrki prison in Moscow, he was not released following the Sikorski-Mayski Agreement as the Soviet authorities argued that he was not a Pole but rather a Swiss citizen and hence the Amnesty for Polish citizens in the Soviet Union did not apply to him. Eugeniusz Bodo starved to death on his way to a remote Soviet gulag camp, in Kotlas. He was declared dead on 7 October 1943.

His whereabouts remained unknown for another 50 years. Before the collapse of communism in 1989, the Soviets gave the false version that Bodo had been murdered by the Germans in 1941. This version is repeated even in some modern publications. It was only in 1991 that the Soviet authorities revealed his fate. The tragic circumstances surrounding Bodo's death became the subject of a documentary by Stanisław Janicki Eugeniusz Bodo: Za winy niepopełnione (For Crimes Not Committed). The title of the 1997 documentary refers to a 1938 film in which Bodo starred.

In October 2011 in Kotlas, where he died, a cenotaph in his honor was unveiled at a local cemetery.

== Films ==
- Rivals (as Geniuś) (1925)
- Czerwony błazen (1926)
- Uśmiech losu (as the dancer in a cabaret) (1927)
- Człowiek o błękitnej duszy (as the sculptor) (1929)
- Police Chief Tagiejew(as Markovskiy) (1929)
- Kult ciała (as Franciszek, Czesław's helper) (1930)
- Na Sybir (as the worker) (1930)
- Niebezpieczny romans (the main villain) (1930)
- The Beauty of Life (1930) (as Roszow) (1930)
- Wiatr od morza (as Otto) (1930)
- Bezimienni bohaterowie (as the police captain Szczerbic) (1932)
- Głos pustyni (as sheik Abdullah) (1932)
- Jego ekscelencja subiekt (Jurek, the title role) (1933)
- Zabawka (Kuźma, son of the forest worker) (1933)
- Czarna perła (as Stefan) (1934)
- Is Lucyna a Girl? (as Stefan Żarnowski) (1934)
- Kocha, lubi, szanuje (as pharmacy terminator Władysław) (1934)
- Pieśniarz Warszawy (as Julian) (1934)
- Jaśnie pan szofer (as Boratyński) (1935)
- American Adventure (as Paweł) (1936)
- Bohaterowie Sybiru (as Władek) (1936)
- Książątko (as Tadeusz Rolski) (1937)
- Neighbors (Piętro wyżej) (as Henryk Pączek, radio speaker) (1937)
- Skłamałam (as Karol Borowicz) (1937)
- Paweł i Gaweł (as Paweł) (1938)
- Robert i Bertrand (as Bertrand) (1938)
- Strachy (as Zygmunt Modecki) (1938)
- Za winy niepopełnione (as Torence, Holski's friend and partner) (1938)
