= Jerzy Petersburski =

Polish actor and musician

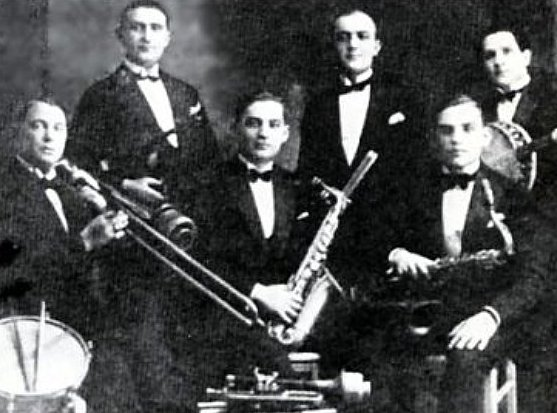
- The Gold & Petersburski Orchestra, which Jerzy co-founded
- Born: 20 April 1895; Warsaw, Congress Poland, Russian Empire
- Died: 7 October 1979 (aged 84); Warsaw, Polish People's Republic
- Occupations: Pianist; composer

Jerzy Petersburski (20 April 1895 – 7 October 1979) was a Jewish Polish pianist and composer of popular music, renowned mostly for his Tangos, some of which (such as To ostatnia niedziela, Już nigdy and Tango milonga / English and German versions: Oh, donna Clara) were milestones in popularization of the musical genre in Poland and are still widely known today, almost a century after their creation.

== Early life ==
Jerzy Petersburski was born on 20 April 1895 into the well-known Warsaw family of Jewish musicians, Melodysta family (on his mother's side). He graduated from the Warsaw Conservatory, where he was taught by professor Antoni Sygietyński. Having graduated, Petersburski moved to Vienna, where he continued his studies in conducting at the faculty of piano of the local Music Academy. A talented pianist, he was persuaded by his friend Imré Kálmán to devote himself to popular rather than classical music. In Vienna he also debuted as a composer for Alexander Vertinsky, a renowned Russian poet and songwriter, famous for his romances.

== Return to Poland ==
Upon his return to Poland, with his cousin Artur Gold, he co-founded the Petersburski & Gold Orchestra, which performed at the fashionable nightspot Adria. He became well known for music for cabaret and theaters in Warsaw. Among them was Julian Tuwim's and Marian Hemar's Qui Pro Quo, one of the most famous Polish cabarets of the interbellum. In late 1920s and 1930s, Petersburski became one of the most popular Polish composers as several of his songs became hits on Polish Radio and in music theatres throughout the country. Apart from Marian Hemar, the list of lyricists for his songs included some of the most renowned of their times: Andrzej Włast, Emanuel Szlechter, Ludwik Szmaragd and Artur Tur. Also the performers of Petersburski's songs added to his popularity: Wera Bobrowska (Już nigdy), Hanka Ordonówna (Sam mi mówiłeś), Tola Mankiewiczówna (Ty, miłość i wiosna), Ludwik Sempoliński (Cała przyjemność), Chór Dana and Mieczysław Fogg (Bez śladu) and Adolf Dymsza (Ja i żonka ma).

Despite having composed numerous waltzes and foxtrots, as well as two operettas (Kochanka z ekranu and Robert i Bertram), Petersburski is best known for his tangos. In 1928 he composed a song for Stanisława Nowicka Tango Milonga. The song became a major hit and was almost instantly translated to several languages, gaining much popularity abroad, both in Europe and in America (the English and German title being Oh, Donna Clara. The song was sung by many foreign artists, including Al Jolson, Henry Varny and Édith Piaf.

"Another of his tango compositions that attained international recognition was To ostatnia niedziela (The last Sunday) (1933) with lyric by Zenon Friedwald describing the final meeting of former lovers who are parting. In Poland, To ostatnia niedziela is commonly and erroneously called the Suicide Tango - although the true Suicide Tango was the Hungarian art song Smutna niedziela (Gloomy Sunday). During the 1930s [Peterburski's tango] became an enormous evergreen in the Soviet Union as Utomlyonnoye sontse, where it was played on virtually every street corner. It was so popular, that it was considered their own Russian tune."

Petersburski also wrote music for four Polish films in the 1930s, including Eugeniusz Bodo's successful Królowa przedmieścia of 1938.

== Air Force Service ==
During the German invasion of Poland in 1939, Petersburski was drafted into the Polish Air Force. After Poland was overrun by both Nazi Germany and Soviet Russia, he escaped Jews-hunting Germans to the Soviet-occupied eastern part of Poland. In 1940, he was allowed to continue his career and became the leader of the Belarusian Jazz Orchestra band. He performed many of his pre-war hits with new lyrics in Russian. Among the original compositions of that time was the very popular waltz Sinii Platochek (The Blue Handkerchief, Polish title Błękitna chusteczka) performed by Klavdiya Shulzhenko, which became a popular folk song under the name The 22 June. Another of his popular Russian songs (performed by, among others, the Isaak Dunayevsky's Orchestra) was Utomlionnoye solntse (Weary sun), in fact a Russian version of his pre-war To ostatnia niedziela. See also Burnt by the Sun. He also reorganized the Petersburski & Gold orchestra, this time together with Artur's brother Henryk Gold.

After the Sikorski-Mayski Agreement of 1941 he joined the Polish II Corps under Władysław Anders. Evacuated from the Soviet Union with the rest of the Polish Army to Persia, he moved to Cairo where he started working for the Polish Radio.

In 1947 he traveled, via Palestine, to Brazil, where he had a piano duo with his friend from pre-war Poland, also a Polish Jewish composer, Alfred Schuetz. From 1948 to 1968 he lived in Argentina, working with 'Radio El Mundo' in Buenos Aires. During this time, he composed the hit song All Roads Lead to Buenos Aires, part of which became a famous radio jingle. He also co-led the El Nacional theatre orchestra with the famous Polish-Jewish cabaret actor Lopek (Kazimierz Krukowski). After the death of his wife Maria Minkowska during the earthquake in 1967, Petersburski moved to Caracas, Venezuela and in 1968 returned to Poland. In 1968, after resettling in his beloved Warsaw, he married Sylwia Klejdysz, an opera singer. His son, Jerzy Petersburski Jr., was born in 1969. Jerzy Petersburski died in Warsaw in 1979.

== Decorations ==
- 1936: Gold Cross of Merit: citation: "the first Polish composer whose music crossed our borders".

== Death ==
Jerzy Petersburski died on 7 October 1979 in Warsaw and is buried in Powązki Cemetery in Warsaw.
