= The Unthinkable (1926 film) =

1926 film

O czym się nie myśli
- Directed by: Edward Puchalski
- Written by: J.H. Skotnicki
- Starring: Józef Węgrzyn; Igo Sym; Mira Zimińska
- Cinematography: Zbigniew Gniazdowski
- Production company: Sfinks
- Release date: 29 April 1926
- Country: Poland
- Languages: Silent; Polish intertitles

The Unthinkable (Polish: O czym się nie myśli) is a 1926 Polish silent drama film directed by Edward Puchalski and starring Józef Węgrzyn, Igo Sym and Mira Zimińska. The film marked the debut of Jan Kiepura who went on to international success. It was made as a follow-up to the 1924 film The Unspeakable by the same director.

The film's sets were designed by the art director Józef Galewski.

== Cast ==
- Józef Węgrzyn as Wierciak
- Maria Modzelewska as Zofia Wierciakówna
- Mania Malukiewicz as Jadzia Wierciakówna
- Igo Sym as Orlicz, composer
- Władysław Grabowski as Borski, violinist
- Mira Zimińska as Wanda, pianist
- Stefan Szwarc as Czernik
- Władysław Walter as Knajpiarz
- Witold Roland as Taki sobie gosc
- Ignacy Miastecki as Felczer
- Janusz Star as Slepy inspicjent
- Jan Kiepura
- Józef Sliwicki
- Paweł Owerłło
- Zofia Czaplińska

== Bibliography ==
- Skaff, Sheila. The Law of the Looking Glass: Cinema in Poland, 1896-1939. Ohio University Press, 2008.
