= Mieczysław Fogg =

Polish singer and artist

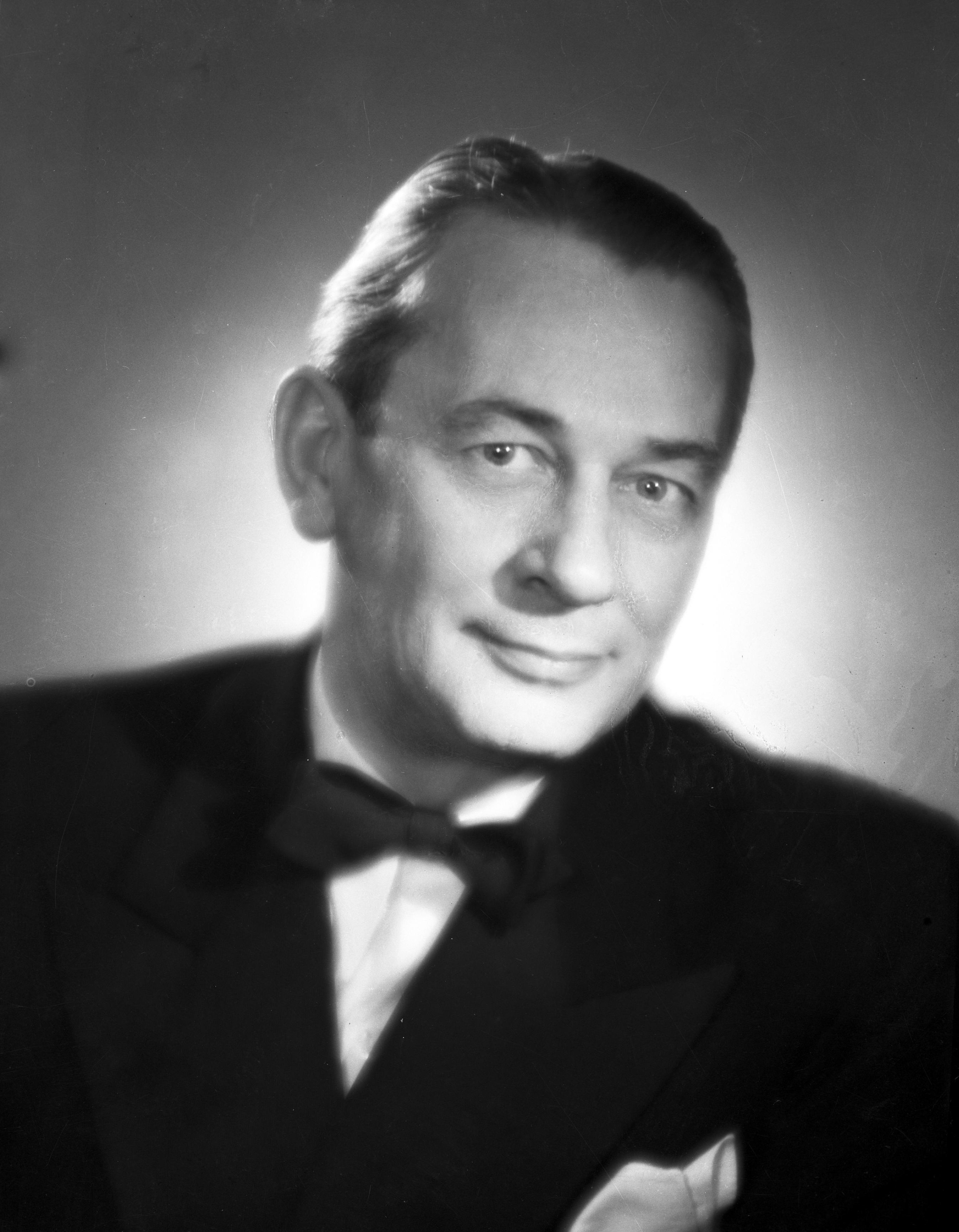

Background information
- Born: Mieczysław Fogiel; May 30, 1901; Warsaw, Congress Poland
- Origin: Warsaw, Poland
- Died: September 3, 1990 (aged 89) Warsaw, Poland
- Genre: Pop
- Occupations: Actor, Film director, Singer, Chorister, Dancer, Pedagogue, Soldier, Ticket clerk
- Instrument: Vocal
- Years active: 1926–1987
- Spouse: Irena Fogg née Jakubowska (married 1925)

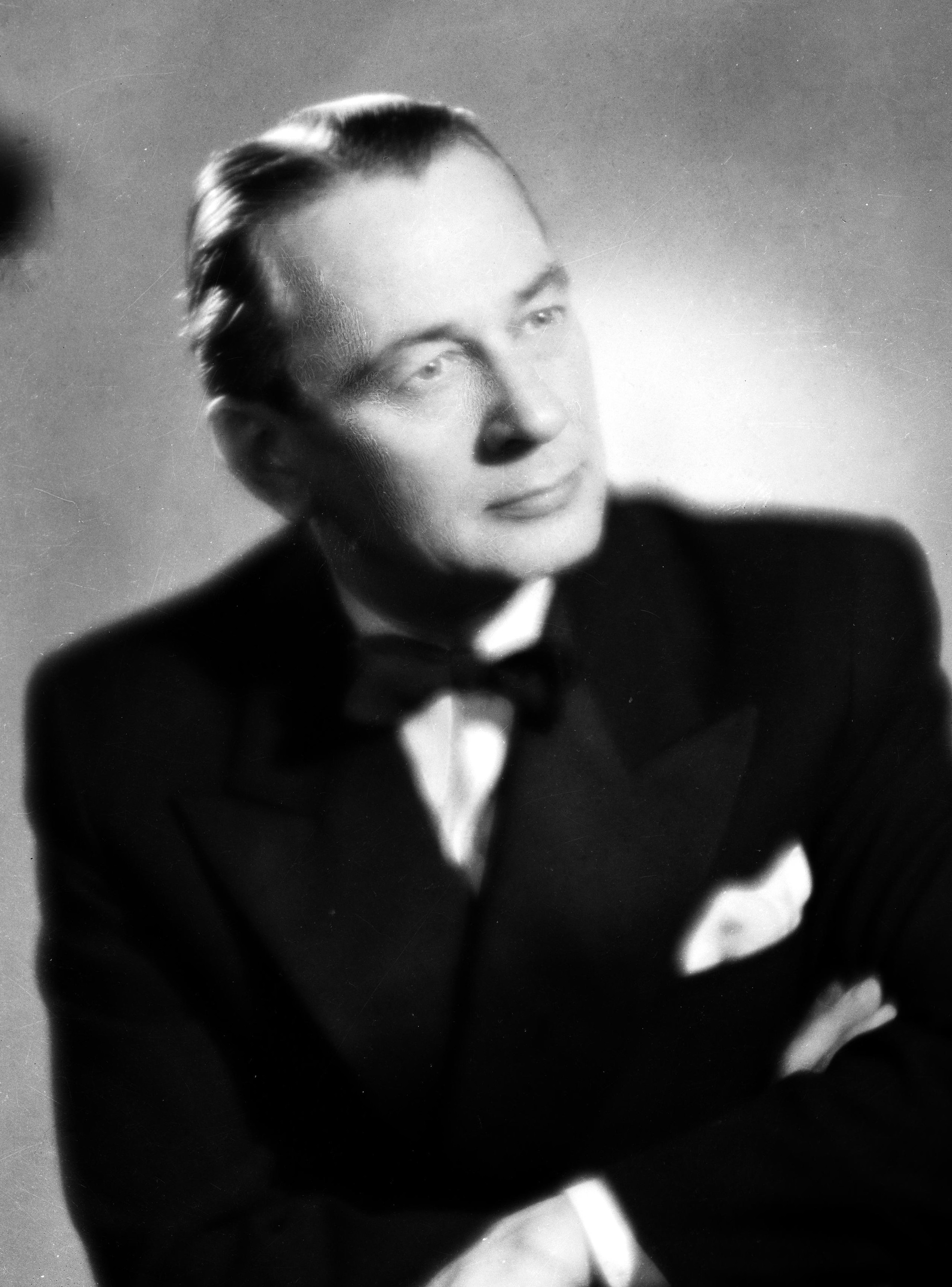

Mieczysław Fogg (born Mieczysław Fogiel; 30 May 1901, Warsaw – 3 September 1990, Warsaw) was a Polish singer and artist. His popularity started well before World War II and continued well into the 1980s. He had a characteristic way of staying very serious yet slightly emotional on stage when singing. Fogg had a lyric baritone voice and can be compared to French Tino Rossi in style.

== Biography ==
Mieczysław Fogiel was born 30 May 1901 in Warsaw, then a province gubernia capital in Russian Empire. His father was Antoni Fogiel (1874–1924), an engine driver, mother was Anna Apolonia Fogiel née Beck (1877–1967), a shopkeeper, he had six siblings. He spent his childhood there and, after graduating from a local gymnasium in 1922, he started working as a railway worker. About that time, he also joined the choir of the St. Anne's Church. There his friend, Ludwik Sempoliński, made him join the classes of music organized by Jan Łysakowski, Eugeniusz Mossakowski, Wacław Brzeziński, Ignacy Dygas and many other notable Polish musicians of the epoch. Initially a hobbyist, in 1928 he met Władysław Daniłowski Dan, who chose him as a soloist for his newly formed Dan's Choir. The choir became extremely popular the following year when Jerzy Petersburski's song Tango Milonga became an international hit. This and other tangos and romances performed by the choir in the famous Qui pro Quo theatre led Fogiel to become one of the most popular Polish singers. After 1932, Fogiel, under a new pseudonym of Fogg, toured a number of countries, including Germany, Latvia, the Soviet Union, Finland, Norway, Sweden, Austria and Italy. In the United States, the group toured over 31 states.

His popularity was increased by the fact that Fogg was keen on languages and was able to sing in local languages of the countries he toured. He also appeared in a number of duos with other popular artists of the time, including Hanka Ordonówna, Stefcia Górska, Zula Pogorzelska and Adolf Dymsza. He also appeared in 11 films. After the Dana Choir was disbanded in 1938, Fogg started a solo career. The same year, he was chosen as the most popular Polish singer by the Polish Radio. He toured the country with a trio consisting of himself, Mira Zimińska and Tadeusz Sygietyński. Among the authors of his songs was also Marian Hemar.

After the outbreak of World War II, Fogg remained in Warsaw, where he joined the underground Armia Krajowa. He gave concerts in the few cafes available to Poles under German occupation. During the Warsaw Uprising, he gave countless concerts both on the barricades, in hospitals and in the bomb shelters beneath the city. For his efforts to keep high the morale of the soldiers and civilians of the fighting city, he was awarded with some of the highest Polish decorations. Fogg was also one of the Polish Righteous among the Nations. He hid a Jewish family of Ivo Wesby in his apartment until the end of World War II.

After the war, in 1945, he opened up his own cafe in the ruins of Warsaw. The cafe, located at 119 Marszałkowska Street, was the first music theatre opened after the war in the destroyed city and served as one of the very few centres of culture. However, the following year, it was nationalized by the new communist authorities of Poland and closed soon afterwards. Fogg continued to give hundreds of concerts in all parts of Poland and also headed his private music record firm Fogg Records, which shared the fate of Fogg's cafe in 1951. His popularity as a singer remained high and in 1958 he was again chosen the most popular Polish singer by the audience of the Polish Radio – 20 years after he was given the same title for the first time.

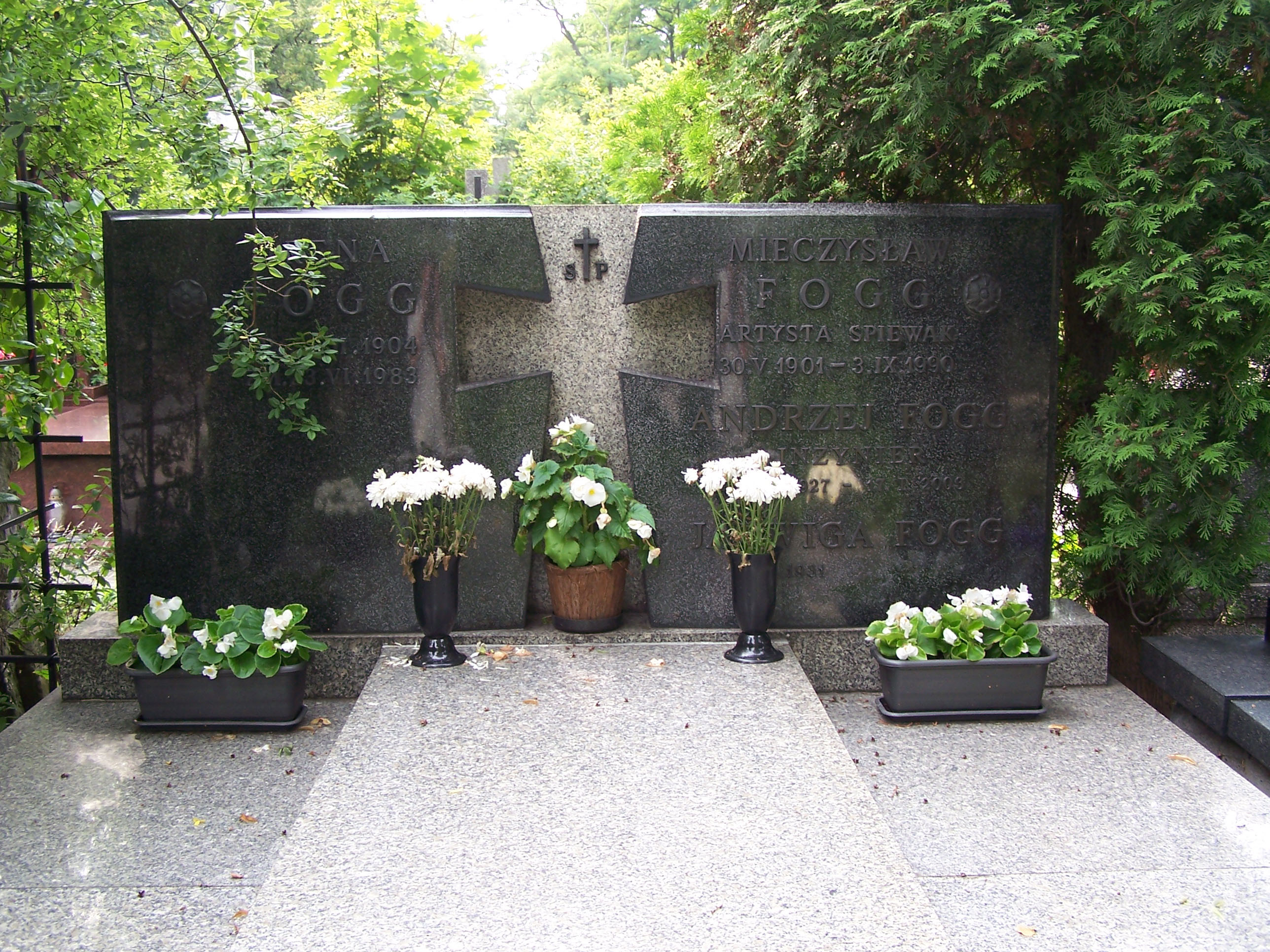
Fogg's grave in the Bródno Cemetery

He continued to give concerts almost until his death in 1990. Throughout his 60-year long career, he gave more than 16,000 of them in all countries of Europe, Brasil, Israel, Ceylon, New Zealand, Australia, Canada and the US. His everlasting popularity led to the creation of a number of anecdotes. In one of them, the Polish archaeologists supposedly discovered an Egyptian mummy. After they unfolded it, they were surprised by the mummy asking a short question: "Is Fogg still giving concerts?"

Mieczysław Fogg died in Warsaw on 3 September 1990 and is buried at the Bródno Cemetery, Warsaw with his wife and son.

== See also ==
- To ostatnia niedziela

== Sources ==
- Rogowski, Zbigniew Karol; Mieszkowska, Anna; Fogg, Mieczysław (2009). Od palanta do belcanta (in Polish) (3rd ed.). Warszawa: Prószyński i S-ka. ISBN 978-83-7648-174-6.
- Michalski, Dariusz (2015). Poletko pana Fogga (in Polish) (2nd ed.). Warszawa: Wydawnictwo MG. ISBN 978-83-7779-519-4.
