= Wesby =

Wesby is a surname. Notable people with the surname include:

- Alex Wesby (born 1980), American basketball player
- Ivo Wesby (1902–1961), Polish composer and director
