= Białostocki (disambiguation) =

Białostocki may refer to:

- Białostocki, meaning "of Bialystok" is used in Polish names for various locations, such as powiat białostocki for Białystok County, Poland
- Jan Białostocki (1921–1988), Polish historian
- Gabriel Białostocki, or Gabriel of Białystok, (1684–1690), a child saint in the Russian Orthodox Church, the victim of a murder which served as a base for a blood libel
- Zygmunt Białostocki (1897–1942), Polish Jewish musician and composer
