= Friedwald =

Friedwald is a surname. Notable people with the surname include:

- Will Friedwald (born 1961), American author and music critic
- Zenon Friedwald (1906–1976), Polish writer, artist, and lyricist
