= Bolek and Lolek (film) =

1936 Polish film

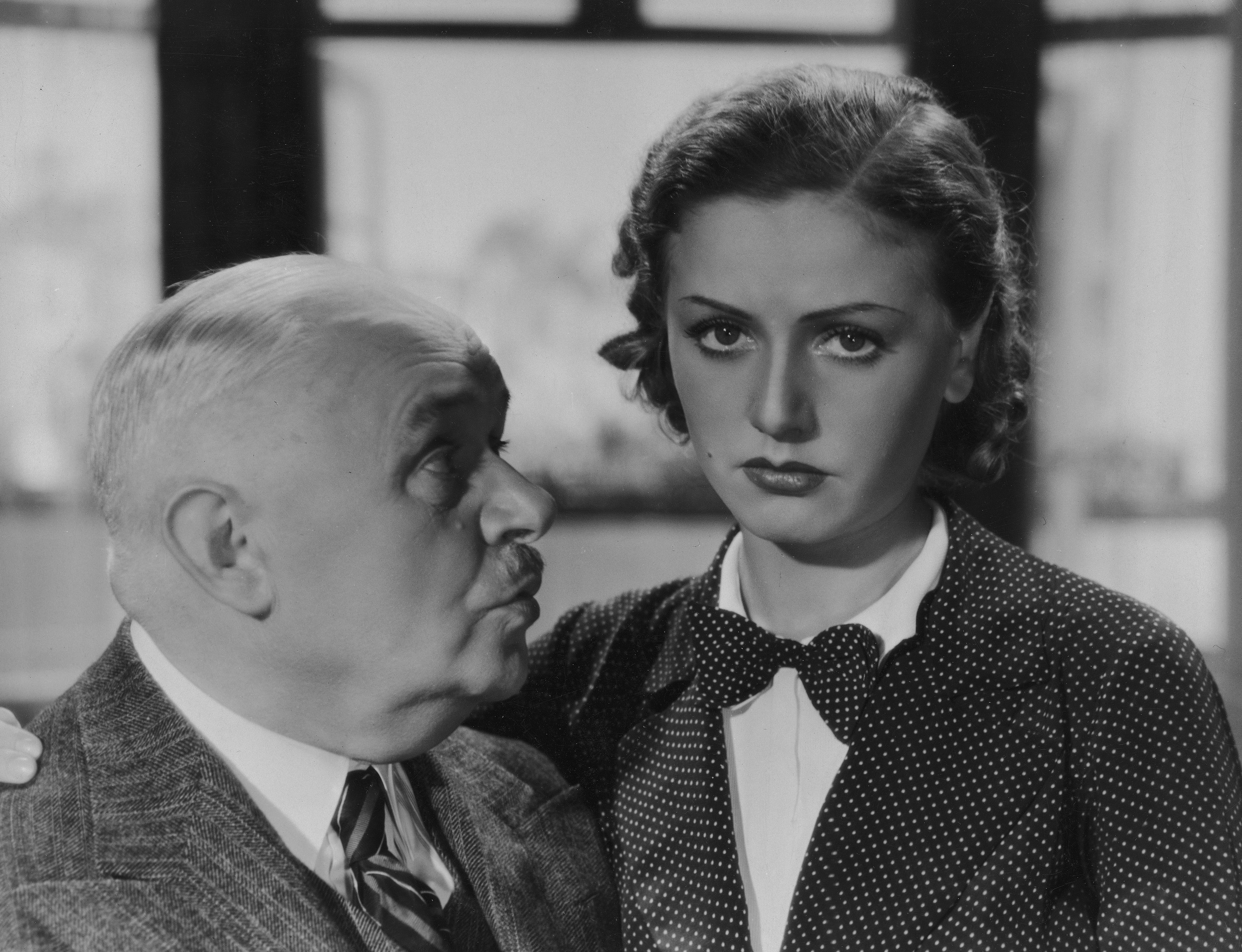
- Scene from the movie
- Directed by: Michał Waszyński
- Written by: Jan Fethke, Napoleon Sadek
- Starring: Adolf Dymsza
- Music by: Jerzy Jurandot
- Production company: Rex-Film
- Release date: 1936
- Country: Poland
- Language: Polish

Bolek and Lolek (Polish: Bolek i Lolek) is a 1936 Polish comedy film directed by Michał Waszyński.

== Reviews ==
"DYMSZA CALLS FOR EVERYONE TO CINEMA "EUROPA* Dymsza is a completely unique natural talent. Dymsza is an actor with incredible intuition. Dymsza is an artist who speaks to the viewer in his own language of means and ways of expression. Dymsza is the Napoleon of humor.

"Bolek and Lolek", in the cinema "Europa*" is Dymsza's latest and best creation.

Script - extremely inventive. Dialogues - witty. Music - catchy. ...The main attraction of the film is Dymsza.

..... phenomenon worth seeing | berghem, film." p.3 Głos Poranny : dziennik społeczny, polityczny i literacki. 1936-11-16 R. 8 nr 315

"AN: "Bolek i Lolek", dir. Waszyński. You can have a recipe for excellent cookies. You can have a recipe for a good comedy or farce. However, for the cookies to be really edible and the comedy really funny, the recipe alone is not enough. Waszyński uses the excellent comedian Dymsza, but he does not know how to use jokes. It is known that at the same "joke", told by the same person, people laugh one time and the joke does not get it another time. More than one of us has experienced this on ourselves. This is only proof of how subtle the effects of jokes are sometimes. Waszyński does not know how to be subtle and uses unpolished ideas according to the cheapest recipe. Ultimately, "Bolek i Lolek", a film with a three plus rating, with democratic tendencies, can be entertainment for the less demanding wider masses. The best part is the beginning, some '/, of the film, in which there is no too much talk and everything is explained by itself, in a film way." p. 634 Myśl Narodowa : tygodnik poświęcony kulturze twórczości polskiej. R. 16, 1936, nr 40

== Cast ==
- Adolf Dymsza ... Bolek Cybuch / Lolek Charkiewicz
- Janina Wilczówna... Krysia Brown
- Antoni Fertner ... Mr. Brown
- Andrzej Bogucki ... Lolek's friend
- Jadwiga Bukojemska
- Helena Cary
- Maria Chmurkowska ... Lolek's Aunt
- Feliks Chmurkowski ... Lolek's Father
- Wladyslaw Grabowski ... Jan, Lolek's servant
- Janina Janecka ... Foreman
- Zdzisław Karczewski ... Franek
- Jerzy Kobusz ... Janek

== Music ==
=== Composer : Henryk Wars Songs : Jerzy Jurandot ===
And play it for me; foxtrot, with Bolek and Lolek, score: Jurandot, music: H. Wars. © Dec. 18, 1936; E for. 49665; New stage, Warsaw, Poland. 14071

[and] O lamour; slow-fox: Zz Bolek and Lolek, score: Jurandot, music; H. Wars, arr. I. Wesby; orchestration pages. © Dec. 18, 1935; EH for. 49667; New stage, Warsaw, Poland. 14072

[and] O lamour; slow-fox: Zz Bolek and Lolek, lyrics: Jurandot, music; H. Wars, arr. I. Wesby; orchestrations pages. © Dec. 18, 1935; EH for. 49667; New scene, Warsaw, Poland. 14072 O, Vamour; slow-fox, from Bolek and Lolek, lyrics: Jurandot, m: H. Wars. © Dec. 18, 1936; E for. 49666; New scene, Warsaw, Poland. 15754
