= Stefania Grodzieńska =

Polish writer, actress, dancer, radio announcer and satirist

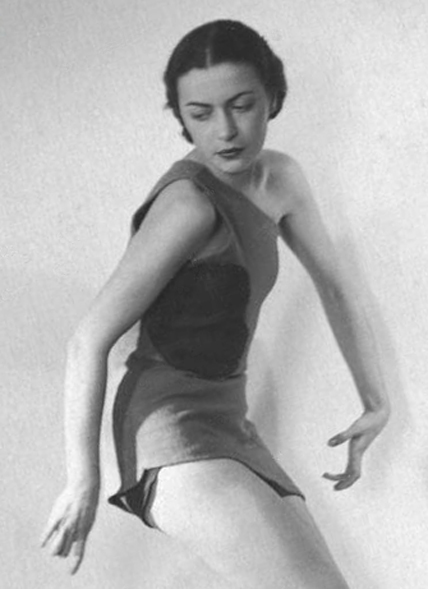
- Grodzieńska in 1937 as stage performer
- Born: 2 September 1914; Łódź, Congress Poland, Russian Empire
- Died: 28 April 2010 (aged 95); Skolimów-Konstancin, Poland
- Other name: Stefania Grodzieńska-Jurandot
- Occupations: Actress, dancer, writer
- Years active: 1933–2010
- Spouse: Jerzy Jurandot
- Website: https://www.imdb.com/name/nm0973225

Stefania Grodzieńska (2 September 1914 – 28 April 2010) was a Polish writer, stage and theatrical actress during the Interbellum; dancer, radio announcer, and satirist known as the First Lady of Polish Humor.

== Biography ==
Grodzieńska was born in Łódź to a family of a university professor during the final years of the Russian imperial possession. She spent some of her childhood in Moscow, and attended a ballet school in Berlin. She married for the first time at the age of 18 and moved to Warsaw in 1933. She worked in Cyganeria Theatre, and danced in Teatr Kameralny (Intimate Theatre). Soon, dir. Fryderyk Jarosy brought her into the staff of Cyrulik Warszawski, a Polish satirical theatre. Grodzieńska met there her second husband, writer Jerzy Jurandot whom she married in 1938. During the Nazi German occupation of Poland they lived in the Warsaw Ghetto, but escaped before the murderous Grossaktion Warsaw of 1942.

After World War II she started writing feuilletons for the Polish satirical magazine Szpilki, she also wrote many monologues and sketches. Her essays were performed by Hanka Bielicka, Adolf Dymsza, Loda Halama, Alina Janowska, Kalina Jędrusik, Bogumił Kobiela, Irena Kwiatkowska and others. For several years Stefania Grodzieńska was working in Polskie Radio, and then for a couple of years in the entertainment section of Telewizja Polska.

She was the wife of Jerzy Jurandot, a poet, dramatist, satirist and songwriter. She died after a short illness on 28 April 2010, aged 95, in Skolimów.

== Writings ==
She authored several sets of feuilletons: Dzionek satyryka, Jestem niepoważna, Brzydki ogród, Felietony i humoreski, Plagi i plażki, Rozmówki, and Kłania się PRL. She also wrote the novel, Wspomnienia chałturzystki as well as several biographies and memoirs.

== Prizes and distinctions ==
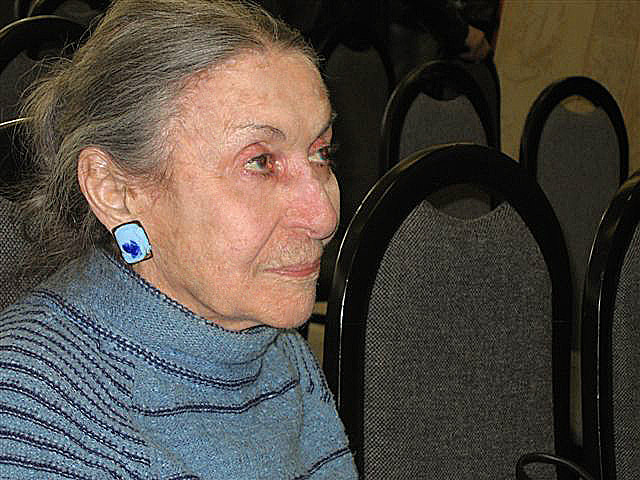
Grodzieńska in 2006 (at age 92)

- Diamentowy Mikrofon (Diamond Microphone)
- Hiacynt (Hyacinth)
- Commander's Cross of the Polonia Restituta
- Gold Medal for Merit to Culture – Gloria Artis
