= Second Youth =

Second Youth may refer to:

- Second Youth (1924 film), an American silent comedy romance
- Second Youth (1938 film), a Polish romantic drama
