= Mohort =

Mohort may refer to:

- Mohort, an 1855 poem by Wincenty Pol
- Julian Mohort, pen name of Polish poet Julian Ochorowicz
- Irena Mohort, a lead character of the 1938 Polish film Second Youth

== See also ==
- Mohor (TV series), an Indian Bengali television soap opera
