= Uhlan's Pledge =

1934 film

- Directed by: Mieczyslaw Krawicz
- Written by: Kazimierz Andrzej Czyzowski; Marian Hemar
- Based on: Uhlan's Pledge by Kazimierz Andrzej Czyzowski
- Produced by: Stanislaw Szebego
- Starring: Witold Conti; Tola Mankiewiczówna; Franciszek Brodniewicz
- Cinematography: Zbigniew Gniazdowski
- Music by: Wladyslaw Eiger
- Production company: Blok-Muzafilm
- Distributed by: Muzafilm
- Release date: 23 February 1934
- Running time: 73 minutes
- Country: Poland
- Language: Polish

Uhlan's Pledge (Polish: Sluby ulanskie) is a 1934 Polish romantic comedy film directed by Mieczyslaw Krawicz and starring Witold Conti, Tola Mankiewiczówna and Franciszek Brodniewicz. It was shot at the Falanga Studios in Warsaw. The film's sets were designed by the art directors Stefan Norris, Jacek Rotmil and Juliusz Gardan. It is also known by the alternative title Love in the Army.

== Cast ==
- Witold Conti as Maj. Jan Zaleski
- Tola Mankiewiczówna as Krzysia, as an adult
- Franciszek Brodniewicz as Col. Goncza
- Maria Modzelewska as Maria Pleszczynska
- Niunia Szalonek as Krzysia, as a child
- Wladyslaw Walter as Doctor Demol
- Irena Skwierczynska as Barbara, Demol's cook
- Maria Zabczynska as Agata, Maria's cook
- Wanda Jarszewska as Gospodyni
- Czeslaw Skonieczny as Wachmistrz. Patyczek
- Stanislaw Sielanski as Grzes
- Aleksander Zabczynski as Stanislaw Pleszczynski
- Wojciech Ruszkowski as Rotmistrz Jakubek
- Wladyslaw Lenczewski as Lasota
- Andrzej Bogucki as Officer
- Leszek Pospielowski as Officer
- Jerzy Sulima-Jaszczolt as Officer
- Kazimierz Pawlowski as Officer

== Bibliography ==
- Haltof, Marek. Historical Dictionary of Polish Cinema. Rowman & Littlefield Publishers, 2015.
- Skaff, Sheila. The Law of the Looking Glass: Cinema in Poland, 1896-1939. Ohio University Press, 2008.
