= To ostatnia niedziela =

Polish tango song

Song
- Published: 1935
- Genre: tango
- Composer: Jerzy Petersburski
- Lyricist: Zenon Friedwald

To ostatnia niedziela (Polish: The Last Sunday; 1935) is one of the long-time hits of Jerzy Petersburski. A nostalgic tango with lyrics by Zenon Friedwald describing the final meeting of former lovers just before they break up. It was performed by numerous artists and gained the nickname of Suicide Tango, due to its brooding lyrical content.

== Other versions ==
In 1937, a Russian version was written by Iosif Alvek and performed by singer Pavel Mikhailov, backed by the State Radio Committee Jazz Band. It was led by pianist Aleksandr Tsfasman under the title of Wearied Sun (Russian: Утомлённое солнце, Utomlyonnoye solntse). After the war the song remained largely successful and was one of the symbols of pre-war music in Polish popular culture. Performed by, among others, Mieczysław Fogg and Piotr Fronczewski. It appeared in a number of films, including:

- Andrei Mikhalkov-Konchalovsky's Siberiade (1979),
- Yuri Norstein's acclaimed Tale of Tales of the same year,
- The Parrot Speaking Yiddish (1990) directed by Efraim Sevela,
- Schindler's List (1993),
- Krzysztof Kieślowski's award-winning Three Colors: White (1994),
- Nikita Mikhalkov's Burnt by the Sun (1994)

There exists a famous contemporary recording of the [violinist Gidon Kremer.

Also the Ukrainian version written by Volodymyr Knyr exists.

A pop-rock version was used for the trailer of Atomic Heart.

== Lyrics ==
=== Polish original ===
Original	Translations	
Polish	English	Russian
Stanza 1
Teraz nie pora szukać wymówek,	Now is not the time to search for excuses,	Теперь не время искать объяснений,
Fakt, że skończyło się,	It's a fact that it's over,	Факт, что все закончилось,
Dziś przyszedł inny, bogatszy	Today another, a wealthier man came,	Теперь пришел другой, он богаче
I lepszy ode mnie,	Better than me	И лучше меня.
I wraz z tobą skradł szczęście me!	And he has stolen, along with you, my happiness	И вместе с тобой он украл мое счастье!
Jedną mam prośbę, może ostatnią	I have one favour to ask, maybe it's the last one	У меня лишь одна просьба, может, последняя
Pierwszą od wielu lat:	The first one for many years:	И первая за много лет —
Daj mi tę jedną niedzielę, ostatnią niedzielę,	Give me this one Sunday, the last Sunday	Дай мне еще одно воскресенье, последнее воскресенье,
A potem niech wali się świat!	And then let the world fall apart.	А после пусть рушится мир!
Chorus
To ostatnia niedziela,	This is the last Sunday	Это последнее воскресенье,
Dzisiaj się rozstaniemy,	Today we break up	Сегодня мы расстанемся,
Dzisiaj się rozejdziemy	Today we walk away	Сегодня мы разойдемся
Na wieczny czas.	Forever	Навеки.
To ostatnia niedziela,	This is the last Sunday	Это последнее воскресенье,
Więc nie żałuj jej dla mnie,	So don't grudge it for me	Так не пожалей его для меня,
Spojrzyj czule dziś na mnie	Look at me, tenderly	Посмотри на меня с чувством
Ostatni raz.	For the last time	В последний раз.
Będziesz jeszcze dość tych niedziel miała,	You will have enough Sundays still	У тебя будет еще сколько угодно таких воскресений,
A co ze mną będzie, któż to wie?	Who knows what will happen to me	А что будет со мной — кто знает?
To ostatnia niedziela,	This is the last Sunday	Это последнее воскресенье,
Moje sny wymarzone,	My dreamed fantasies,	Мои мечтательные сны,
Szczęście tak upragnione	The happiness I desired	Счастье, такое желанное,
Skończyło się!	Are over	Закончилось!
Stanza 2
Pytasz co zrobię i dokąd pójdę.	You ask, what will I do, where will I go	Ты спрашиваешь, что я сделаю и куда пойду.
Dokąd mam iść? Ja wiem!	Where should I go? I know!	Куда мне идти? Я знаю!
Dziś dla mnie jedno jest wyjście,	There is only one solution	Теперь для меня есть один выход,
Ja nie znam innego,	I don't know about any other	Другого я не знаю,
Tym wyjściem jest… no, mniejsza z tem.	This solution is... let's not talk about that	Этот выход… впрочем, не будем об этом.
Jedno jest ważne, masz być szczęśliwa,	One thing is important, you must be happy	Важно одно — ты должна быть счастлива,
O mnie już nie troszcz się.	Don't worry about me anymore	Обо мне уже не беспокойся.
Lecz zanim wszystko się skończy,	But before all ends	Только прежде чем все закончится,
Nim los nas rozłączy,	Before the destiny sets us apart	Прежде чем судьба разлучит нас,
Tę jedną niedzielę daj mnie.	Give me this last Sunday	Дай мне это единственное воскресенье.
Chorus

=== Russian version ===
Original (Russian)	Translation (English)
Chorus
Утомлённое солнце	The weary sun
Нежно с морем прощалось,	Gently parted with the sea,
В этот час ты призналась,	At this hour you declared,
Что нет любви.	There is no love.
Stanza
Мне немного взгрустнулось —	I was saddened slightly -
Без тоски, без печали	Without anguish, without sorrow
В этот час прозвучали	At this hour resounded
Слова твои.	Your words.
Расстаёмся, я не стану злиться,	As we part, I will not be angry,
Виноваты в этом ты и я.	The fault lies with me and you.
Chorus
