= Adventure in Warsaw =

1938 film directed by Carl Boese

- Directed by: Carl Boese
- Written by: Bobby E. Lüthge; Konrad Tom
- Starring: Georg Alexander; Paul Klinger; Jadwiga Kenda; Hedda Björnson
- Cinematography: Georg Krause
- Music by: Michael Jary
- Production companies: Nerthus Film; Polski Tobis
- Distributed by: Tobis Film
- Release date: 1 February 1938
- Countries: Germany; Poland
- Language: German

Adventure in Warsaw (German: Abenteuer in Warschau) is a 1938 German-Polish comedy film directed by Carl Boese, starring Georg Alexander, Paul Klinger and Jadwiga Kenda. The film was the second of two German-Polish co-productions following Augustus the Strong (1936).

A separate Polish version A Diplomatic Wife was released.

== Cast ==
- Georg Alexander as Exzellenz Bernardo de Rossi - Gesandter in Warschau
- Paul Klinger as Henry de Fontana - Gesandtschaftsrat
- Jadwiga Kenda as Jadwiga Janowska - seine Frau
- Hedda Björnson as Ines Costello - eine junge Witwe
- Baby Gray as Wanda - eine angehende Soubrette
- Robert Dorsay as Jan - Operettenbuffo
- Richard Romanowsky as Stanislaus Bilinski - Theaterdirektor
- Rudolf Carl as Kupka - sein Sekretär
- Mieczysława Ćwiklińska as Apollonia, komische Alte
- Eugen Wolff as Mit seinen Tanzorchester

== Bibliography ==
- Bock, Hans-Michael; Bergfelder, Tim, eds. (2009). The Concise Cinegraph: Encyclopaedia of German Cinema. New York: Berghahn Books. ISBN 978-1-57181-655-9.
- Kreimeier, Klaus (1999). The Ufa Story: A History of Germany's Greatest Film Company, 1918–1945. Berkeley: University of California Press. ISBN 978-0-520-22069-0.
- Skaff, Sheila (2008). The Law of the Looking Glass: Cinema in Poland, 1896–1939. Athens, OH: Ohio University Press. ISBN 978-0-8214-1784-3.
