= Henryk Rzętkowski =

Polish actor

- Born: 15 April 1901; Warsaw, Poland, Russian Empire (now Warsaw, Poland)
- Died: 10 January 1972 (aged 70); Warsaw, Poland
- Occupation: Actor
- Years active: 1924–1960

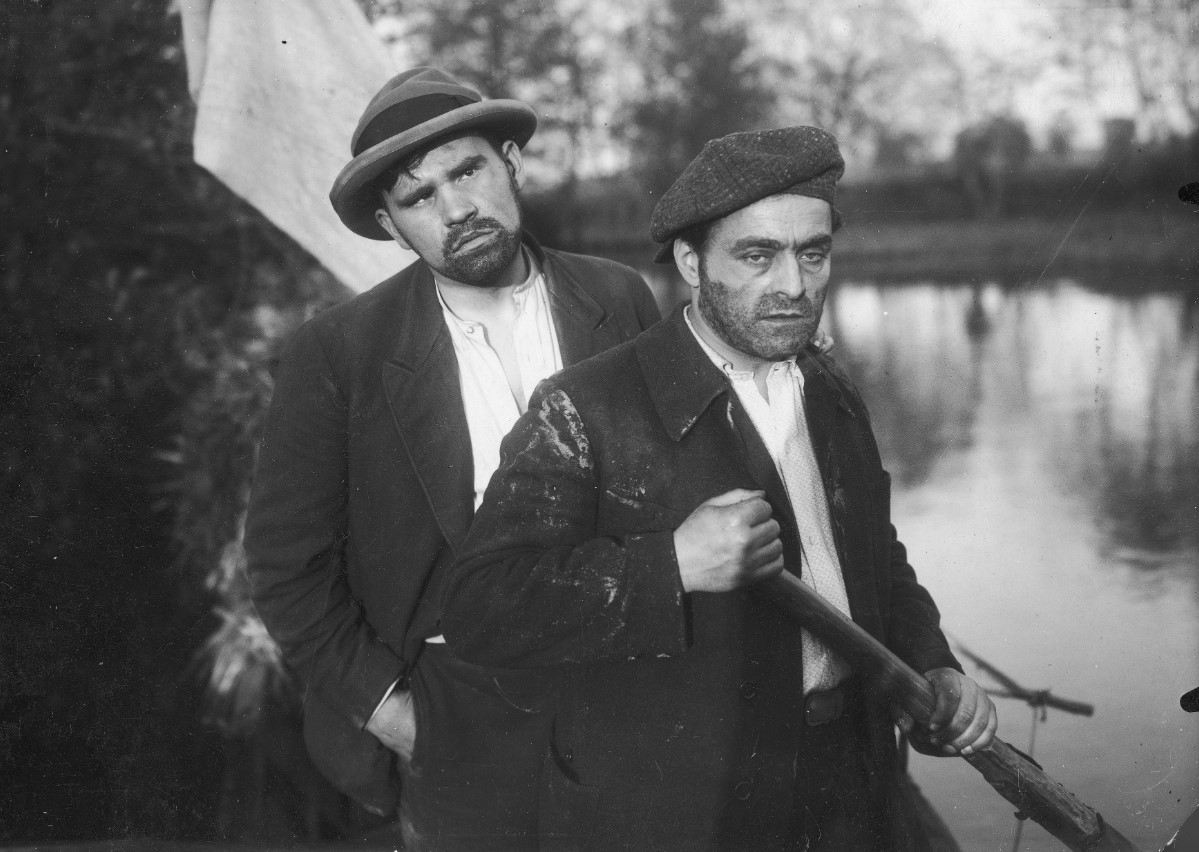
Henryk Rzętkowski and Michał Halicz in a scene from the film "Uhlans, Uhlans, Painted Boys"

Henryk Rzętkowski (15 April 1901 – 10 January 1972) was a Polish film actor. He appeared in more than 25 films between 1924 and 1960.

== Selected filmography ==
- Pan Tadeusz (1928)
- Police Chief Tagiejew (1929)
- The Ten from Pawiak Prison (1931)
- Księżna Łowicka (1932)
- His Excellency, The Shop Assistant (1933)
- Pieśniarz Warszawy (1934)
