= Wojciech Ruszkowski =

Polish actor

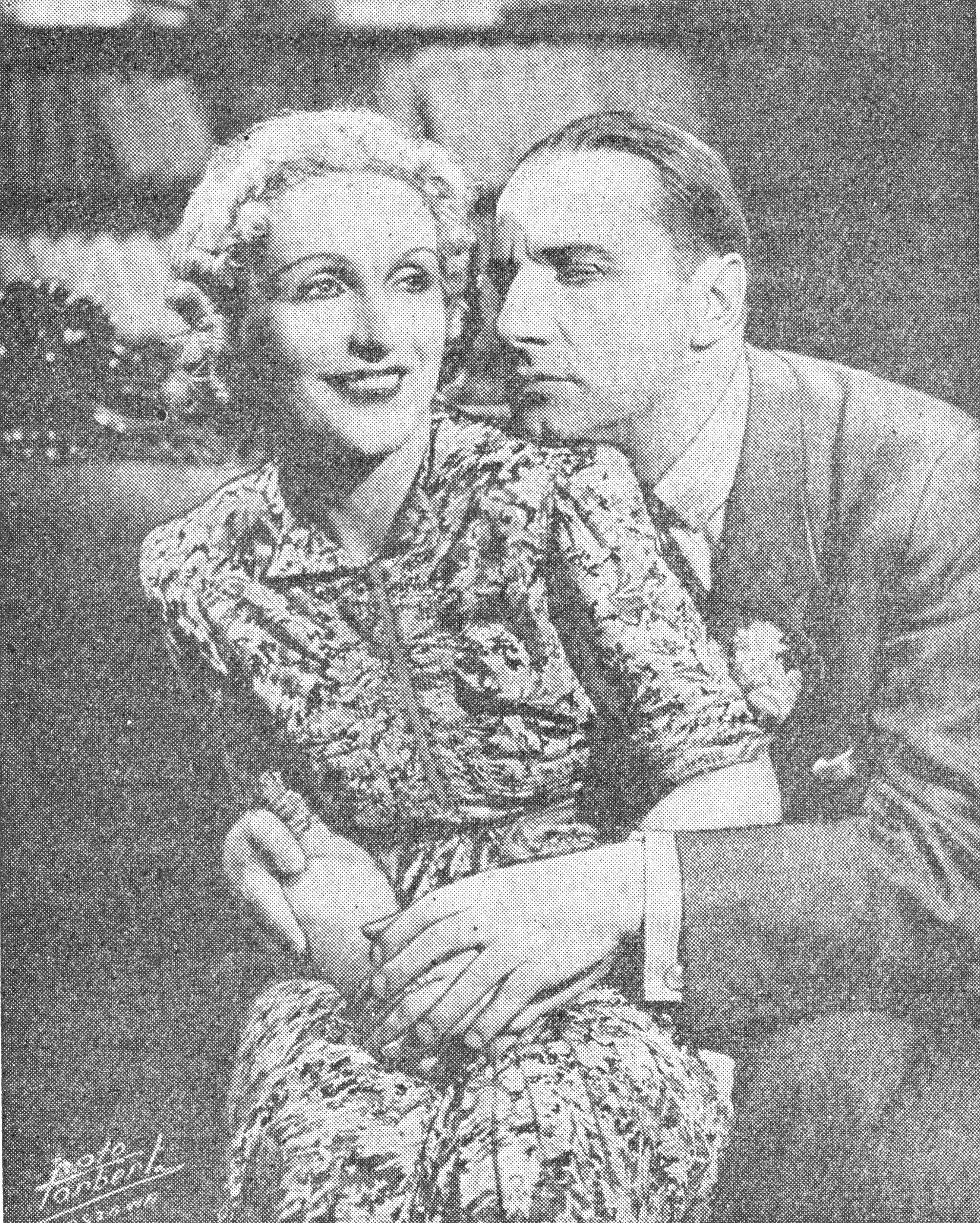
- Wojciech Ruszkowski with Kazimiera Skalska
- Born: 29 May 1897; Lemberg, Austria-Hungary (now Lviv, Ukraine)
- Died: 29 December 1976 (aged 79); Kraków, Poland
- Occupation: Actor
- Years active: 1933-1967

Wojciech Roman Ruszkowski (29 May 1897 – 29 December 1976) was a Polish film actor. He appeared in ten films between 1933 and 1967.

== Selected filmography ==
- Prokurator Alicja Horn (1933)
- Co mój mąż robi w nocy (1934)
- Uhlan's Pledge (1934)
- Love, Cherish, Respect (1934)
- Two Joasias (1935)
- A Diplomatic Wife (1937)
- A Sportsman Against His Will (1940)
