= Maria Chmurkowska =

Polish actress (1901–1979)

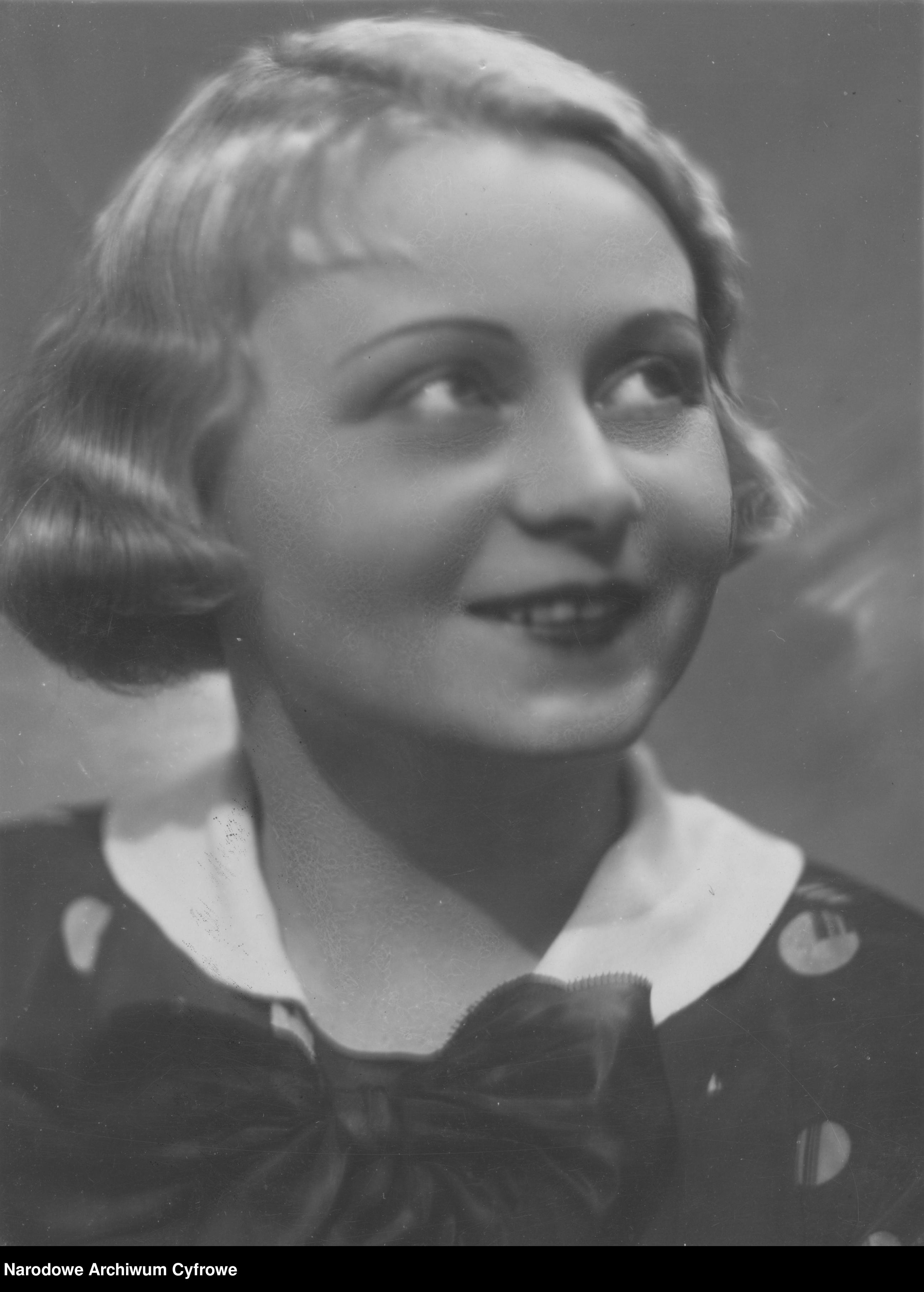
- Born: 9 January 1901; Warsaw, Poland, Russian Empire (now Warsaw, Poland)
- Died: 9 June 1979 (aged 78); Warsaw, Poland
- Occupation: Actress
- Years active: 1934–1967

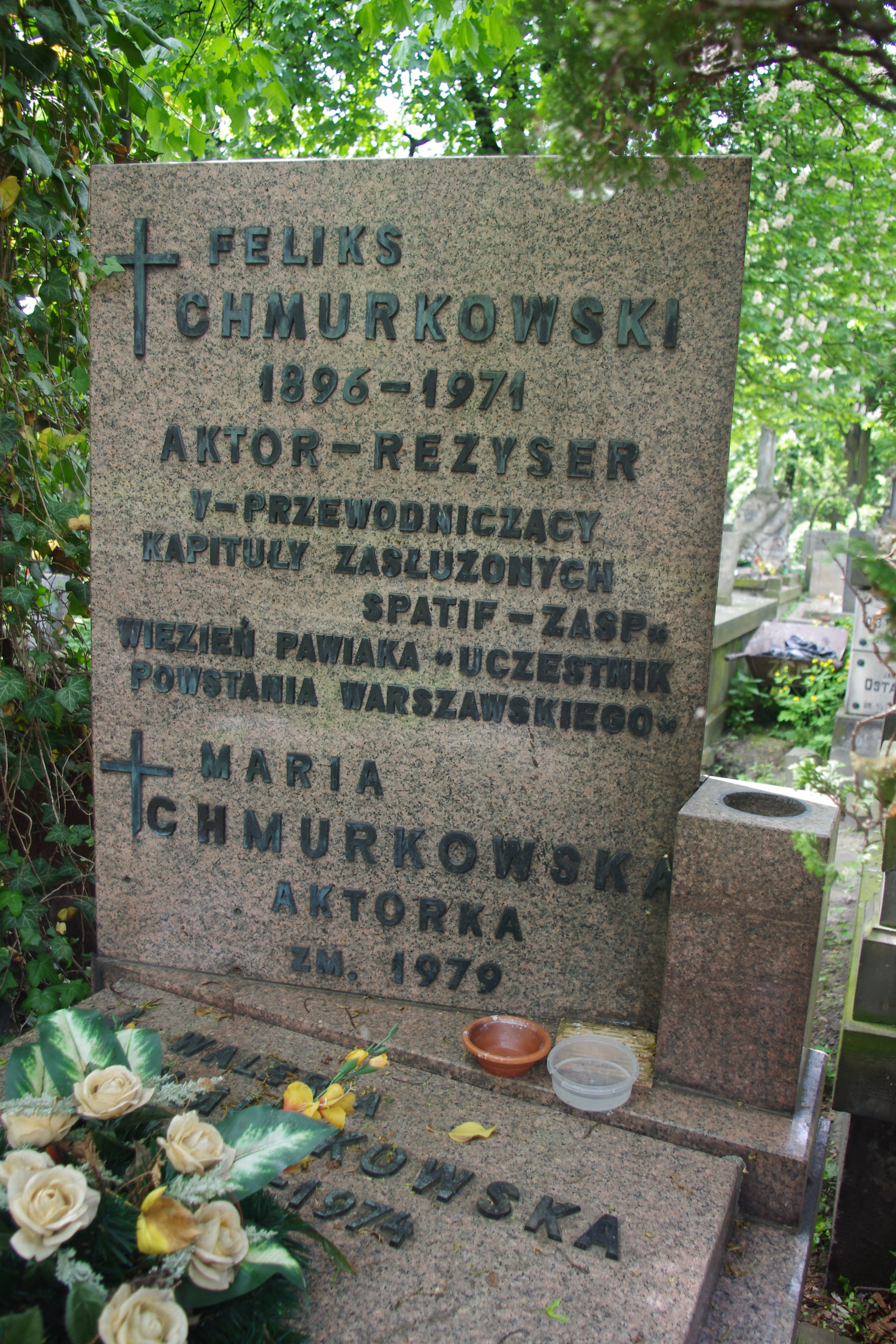
Grave of Chmurkowska at the Powązki Cemetery in Warsaw

Maria Chmurkowska (9 January 1901 – 9 June 1979) was a Polish film actress. She appeared in ten films between 1934 and 1967.

== Selected filmography ==
- Love, Cherish, Respect (1934)
- Bolek i Lolek (1936)
- 30 karatów szczęścia (1936)
- Krystyna's Lie (1939)
