= Ostatnia brygada =

1938 Polish film

- Directed by: Michał Waszyński
- Written by: Anatol Stern
- Based on: Ostatnia brygada by Tadeusz Dołęga-Mostowicz
- Starring: Zbigniew Sawan, Maria Gorczyńska, Elżbieta Barszczewska, Lidia Wysocka
- Music by: Henryk Wars
- Release date: September 20, 1938 (Poland)
- Country: Poland
- Language: Polish

Ostatnia brygada (literally, "last brigade"; alternative title: Prawo do szczęścia) is a 1938 Polish film scripted by Anatol Stern from a novel of the same name by Tadeusz Dołęga-Mostowicz. It was directed by Michał Waszyński, and starred Zbigniew Sawan, Maria Gorczyńska, Elżbieta Barszczewska, and Lidia Wysocka.

== Plot ==
Andrzej Dowmunt, who has acquired a large fortune in Africa, returns to Poland to invest his capital in his homeland. To his surprise, he notices that the Polish elites do not care about the fate of the reborn state and its economic situation, but only about their own private interests. Despite his resistance, Andrzej gradually becomes part of the corrupt elites and leads an empty life. As a wealthy and handsome man, he is very popular with women.

Andrzej becomes entangled in an unfortunate affair with Lena, the wife of a wealthy banker, who turns out to be an agent of Soviet intelligence. He breaks up with her and has her arrested. He decides he must put his life in order and use his fortune for the economic development of the country. He marries Marta Rzecka and opens a grain trading company. Family happiness and business success are disrupted by the news of his old friend Michał Żegota's terminal illness. Andrzej visits Michał and encounters his wife, Ewa, who was Andrzej's first love.

It is revealed that Ewa's ten-year-old son, Janek, is actually Andrzej's child. After Michał dies, Andrzej decides to divorce his wife Marta to be with Ewa, but fate intervenes and Ewa drowns at sea. Janek is now an orphan and Andrzej and Marta take him in to raise as their own.

== Cast ==
- Zbigniew Sawan ... Andrzej Dowmunt
- Maria Gorczyńska ... Lena
- Elżbieta Barszczewska ... Ewa
- Lidia Wysocka ... Marta Rzecka
- Jerzy Pichelski ... Żegota
- Kazimierz Junosza-Stępowski ... Kulcz, Lena's husband
- Stanisław Sielański ... Feliks
- Pelagia Relewicz-Ziembińska ... Zuzanna
- Aleksander Balcerzak ... Janek
- Marcin Bay-Rydzewski ... Valet
- Józef Maliszewski ... Doctor
- Henryk Rydzewski ... Officer
- Artur Socha ... Engineer
- Zofia Wilczyńska ... Chambermaid
