= Augustus the Strong (film) =

1936 film

- German: August der Starke
- Directed by: Paul Wegener
- Written by: Herbert Tjadens; Johannes Eckardt; Rolf Meyer; Carl Haensel
- Produced by: Curt Haensel
- Starring: Michael Bohnen; Lil Dagover; Marieluise Claudius; Günther Hadank
- Cinematography: Karl Puth
- Edited by: Rolf Meyer
- Music by: Hans Erdmann
- Production companies: Nerthus Film; Polski Tobis
- Distributed by: Hammer-Tonfilm
- Release dates: 17 January 1936 (Germany); November 1936 (Poland)
- Running time: 108 minutes
- Countries: Germany; Poland
- Language: German

Augustus the Strong (German: August der Starke) is a 1936 German-Polish biographical film directed by Paul Wegener and starring Michael Bohnen, Lil Dagover, and Marieluise Claudius. The film depicts the life of Augustus the Strong, the Eighteenth Century ruler of Saxony and Poland. It was partly shot at the Grunewald Studios in Berlin. The film's sets were designed by the art directors Karl Machus and Ludwig Reiber.

== Production ==
A multiple-language version was made in Polish, directed by Stanisław Wasylewski and featuring a Polish cast. Another Polish-German co-production Adventure in Warsaw was produced the following year.

== Cast ==
- Michael Bohnen as Augustus the Strong
- Lil Dagover as Countess Aurore Königsmark
- Marieluise Claudius as Countess Anna Constanze Cosel
- Günther Hadank as Charles XII
- Franz Schafheitlin as Flemming
- Ernst Legal as Joseph Fröhlich/Count Saumagen
- Walther Süssenguth as Fürstenberg
- Maria Krahn as Eberhardine
- Karl Hannemann as Patkul
- Paul Mederow as Pöppelmann
- Hans Kettler as Schulenburg
- Curt Lucas as Count Hoym
- Rose Borgh as Ballet Dancer 2
- Eva Wegener as Ballet Dancer 1
- Ernst Rotmund as Wirt in Warschau
- Hans Rudolf Waldburg as the Bishop of Gnesen
- Ewald Schindler as the personal physician
- Franz Weilhammer as Permoser
- Carl Heinz Charrell as Dinglinger
- Paul Hildebrandt as Leibbursche at Karl XII
- Ferdinand Asper as Ballet Master
- Wolfgang von Schwindt as host
- Dieter Horn as Brühl
- Franz Stein as superintendent
- Armin Schweizer as Hofriseur
- Kai Möller as General Piper
- Maria Loja as ballet master
- Hamala as dancer
- Maria Balcerkiewiczówna as Princess Jablonowska
- Maria Wieke as Ihre Begleiterin
- Tamara Wiszniewska as Jasia
- Franciszek Brodniewicz as Adelsmarschall
- Wanda Jarszewska as Eine polnische Wirtin
- Harry Muratov as Polish innkeeper
- Loda Halama as young fiancée
- Wilhelm Mewes as Saxon Kutscher
- Aleksander Suchcicki as court marshal

== See also ==
- The King's Prisoner (1935)

== Bibliography ==
- Bock, Hans-Michael; Bergfelder, Tim, eds. (2009). The Concise Cinegraph: Encyclopaedia of German Cinema. New York: Berghahn Books. ISBN 978-1-57181-655-9.
- Bock, Hans-Michael . Die Tobis 1928-1945: eine kommentierte Filmografie. Edition Text + Kritik, 2003.
- Klaus, Ulrich J. Deutsche Tonfilme: Jahrgang 1936. Klaus-Archiv, 1988.
