= A Sportsman Against His Will =

1940 film

- Directed by: Mieczyslaw Krawicz
- Written by: Marek M. Libkow; Ludwik Starski
- Produced by: Marek M. Libkow
- Starring: Adolf Dymsza; Aleksander Zabczynski; Ina Benita
- Cinematography: Jack Jonilowicz
- Music by: Henry Vars
- Production company: Libkow Film
- Release date: 31 May 1940
- Running time: 78 minutes
- Country: Poland
- Language: Polish

A Sportsman Against His Will (Polish: Sportowiec mimo woli) is a 1940 Polish comedy film directed by Mieczyslaw Krawicz and starring Adolf Dymsza, Aleksander Zabczynski and Ina Benita. Location shooting took place around Zakopane. The film's sets were designed by the art directors Stefan Norris, Jacek Rotmil and Józef Galewski. It was the last film produced during the Second Polish Republic completed just before the outbreak of the Second World War and released during the Occupation of Poland.

== Synopsis ==
Dodek Czwartek, a Warsaw hairdresser swaps places with Jerzy Piatek a top ice hockey player to aid the latter in his pursuit of the attractive Lili, an industrialist's daughter.

== Cast ==
- Adolf Dymsza as Dodek Czwartek - Hairstylist
- Aleksander Zabczynski as Jerzy Piatek
- Ina Benita as Lili Madecka
- Józef Orwid as Melchior Madecki
- Helena Buczynska as Mrs. Madecka
- Stanislaw Wolinski as Jan - Butler
- Ludwik Sempolinski as Baron Drops
- Halina Doree as Idalia - Secretary
- Wojciech Ruszkowski as Dzems - Hotel Detective
- Jerzy Lasocki as Adas - Hairstylist
- Henryk Malkowski as Kulka - Wlasciciel Sklepu
- Roman Deren as Hair Salon Owner
- Wojciech Trojanowski as Komentator radiowy
- Zdzislaw Motyka as Sport instructor

== Bibliography ==
- Haltof, Marek. Historical Dictionary of Polish Cinema. Rowman & Littlefield Publishers, 2015.
- Skaff, Sheila. The Law of the Looking Glass: Cinema in Poland, 1896-1939. Ohio University Press, 2008.
