= Two Joasias =

1935 film

- Directed by: Mieczyslaw Krawicz
- Written by: Jan Fethke
- Starring: Jadwiga Smosarska; Ina Benita; Franciszek Brodniewicz
- Cinematography: Zbigniew Gniazdowski
- Music by: Wladyslaw Eiger; Alfred Scher; Stanislaw Szebego
- Production company: Blok-Muzafilm
- Release date: 25 September 1935
- Running time: 86 minutes
- Country: Poland
- Language: Polish

Two Joasies (Polish: Dwie Joasie) is a 1935 Polish comedy film directed by Mieczyslaw Krawicz and starring Jadwiga Smosarska, Ina Benita and Franciszek Brodniewicz. It was shot at the Falanga Studios in Warsaw. The film's sets were designed by the art directors Stefan Norris, Jacek Rotmil and Juliusz Gardan. It is also referred to in some English-language sources as Love Conquers All, as it was released in the United States in 1936 as Milosc Wszystko Zwycieza, which so translates.

== Cast ==
- Jadwiga Smosarska as Joasia Wisniewska
- Ina Benita as Flora
- Lucyna Szczepanska as Klimcia
- Franciszek Brodniewicz as Robert Rostalski
- Michal Znicz as Hilary Cicherkiewicz
- Wojciech Ruszkowski as Michal Grubski - Rostalski's Friend
- Wladyslaw Grabowski as Anzelm - Rostalski's Tailor
- Aleksander Zelwerowicz as Kowalski
- Janina Janecka as Mrs. Kowalska
- Ludwik Fritsche as Prince
- Zofia Czaplinska as Janowa
- Tadeusz Fijewski as Antos the Courier
- Aleksander Suchcicki as Rene - Foredancer
- Loda Niemirzanka as Candidate for the Position of Typist

== Bibliography ==
- Haltof, Marek. Historical Dictionary of Polish Cinema. Rowman & Littlefield Publishers, 2015.
- Skaff, Sheila. The Law of the Looking Glass: Cinema in Poland, 1896-1939. Ohio University Press, 2008.
