= Józef Węgrzyn =

Polish actor

Józef Wegrzyn
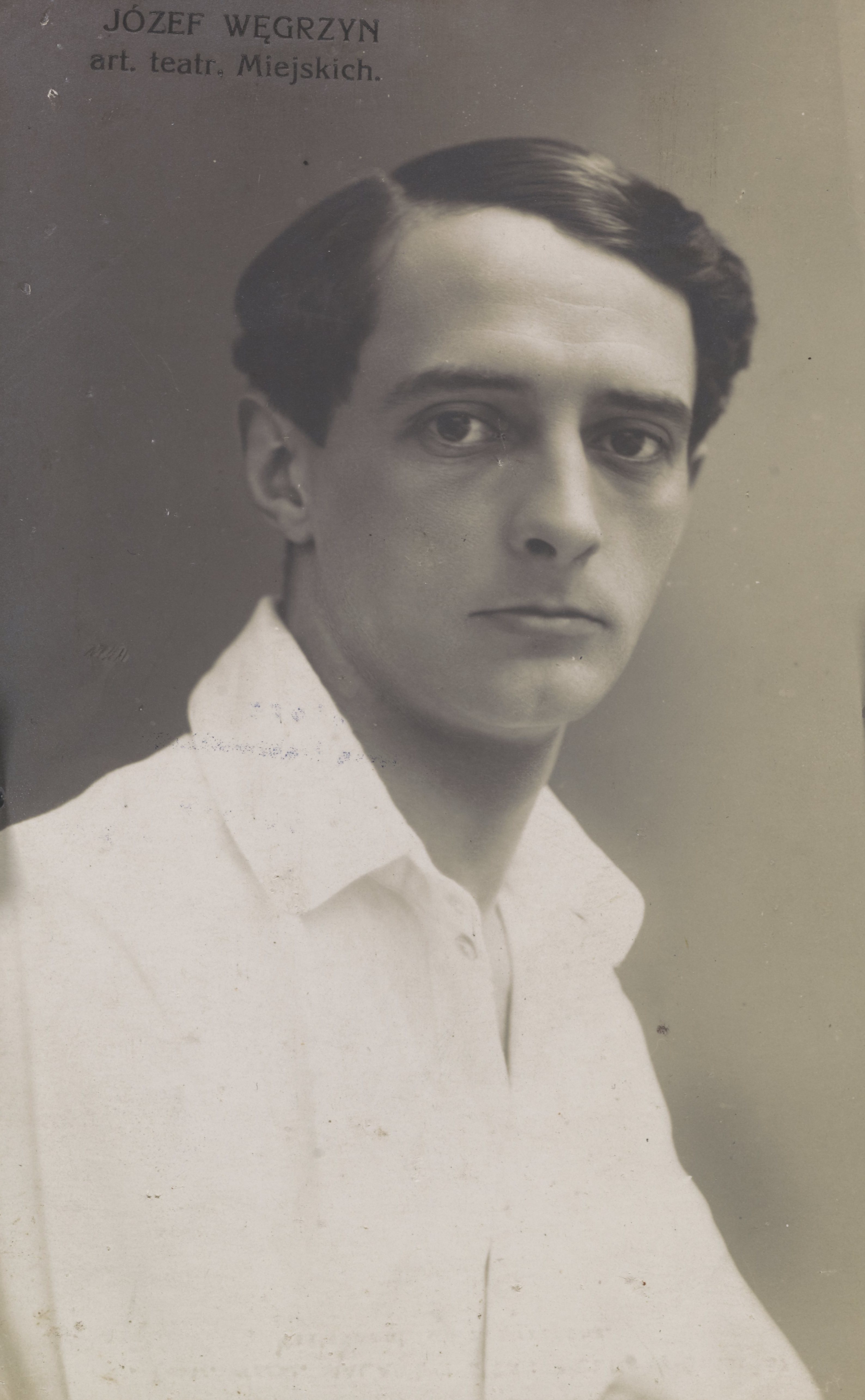
- Born: 13 March 1884; Warsaw, Poland, Russian Empire
- Died: 4 September 1952 (aged 68); Koscian, Wielkopolskie, Poland
- Occupation: Actor
- Years active: 1914–1957 (film )

Józef Wegrzyn (1884–1952) was a Polish film actor.

== Selected filmography ==
- Ludzie bez jutra (1921)
- Ssanin (1924)
- The Unspeakable (1924)
- The Unthinkable (1926)
- The Ten from Pawiak Prison (1931)
- Księżna Łowicka (1932)
- The Story of Sin (1933)
- The Leper (1936)
- Znachor (1937)
- Rena (1938)
- Profesor Wilczur (1938)

== Bibliography ==
- Skaff, Sheila. The Law of the Looking Glass: Cinema in Poland, 1896–1939. Ohio University Press, 2008.
