= A Diplomatic Wife =

1937 film directed by Carl Boese and Mieczysław Krawicz

- Directed by: Carl Boese; Mieczysław Krawicz
- Written by: Bobby E. Lüthge; Konrad Tom
- Starring: Jadwiga Kenda; Aleksander Żabczyński; Lena Żelichowska; Mieczysława Ćwiklińska
- Cinematography: Henryk Vlassak
- Music by: Michael Jary
- Production companies: Nerthus Film; Polski Tobis
- Distributed by: Tobis Film
- Release date: 28 March 1937
- Countries: Germany; Poland
- Language: Polish

A Diplomatic Wife (Polish: Dyplomatyczna żona) is a 1937 German-Polish comedy film directed by Carl Boese and Mieczysław Krawicz, starring Jadwiga Kenda, Aleksander Żabczyński and Lena Żelichowska. It is the Polish language version of Adventure in Warsaw.

== Cast ==
- Jadwiga Kenda as Jadwiga Janowska
- Aleksander Żabczyński as Henryk de Fontana
- Lena Żelichowska as Inez de Costello
- Mieczysława Ćwiklińska as Apolonia
- Tadeusz Frenkiel as Radio Reporter
- Helena Grossówna as Wanda
- Loda Halama as Dancer
- Wanda Jarszewska as Salon Owner
- Józef Kondrat as Krupka, male secretary
- Jerzy Leszczyński as Ambassador
- Wojciech Ruszkowski as Jan Wolski
- Igo Sym as Tenor
- Michał Znicz as Theater Director

== Bibliography ==
- Bock, Hans-Michael & Bergfelder, Tim. The Concise Cinegraph: Encyclopaedia of German Cinema. Berghahn Books, 2009.
- Kreimeier, Klaus. The Ufa Story: A History of Germany's Greatest Film Company, 1918–1945. University of California Press, 1999.
- Skaff, Sheila. The Law of the Looking Glass: Cinema in Poland, 1896–1939. Ohio University Press, 2008.
