= Ivo Wesby =

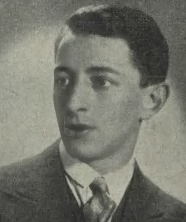
- Born: Ignacy Singer; 1902; Kraków, Poland
- Died: 1961 (aged 58–59)

Ivo Wesby (1902–1961), born Ignacy Singer in Kraków, Poland, was a Polish composer and director. He studied music in Vienna. In the 1920s he was music director of various revi-teaters (revue theaters) in Warsaw, and in the last years before the outbreak of World War II he led the well known Groyse Revie (Big Revue). Wesby was a music director for some famous Polish and Yiddish films including Mamele, Fredek uszczęśliwia świat, Co mój mąż robi w nocy, Serce matki, Moi rodzice rozwodzą się, Gehenna, Rena, and Królowa przedmieścia.

In the Warsaw Ghetto, with Jerzy Jurandot he created a revi-teater in the Polish language, with actors from the Polish stage. He survived the war thanks to Polish singer Mieczysław Fogg, who hid his family, and emigrated to the United States.
