= Maria Gorczyńska =

Polish actress (1899–1959)

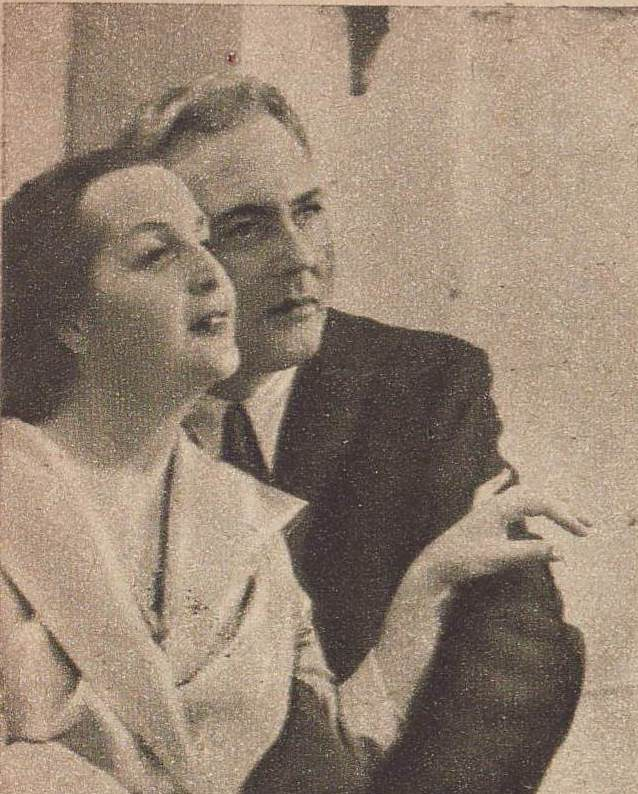
- Maria Gorczyńska and Aleksander Żabczyński in a film scene in 1948
- Born: 27 January 1899; Lublin, Poland, Russian Empire (now Lublin, Poland)
- Died: 23 June 1959 (aged 60); Warsaw, Poland
- Occupation: Actress
- Years active: 1922-1959

Maria Gorczyńska (27 January 1899 – 23 June 1959) was a Polish stage and film actress. She appeared in fifteen films between 1924 and 1952.

== Selected filmography ==
- The Unspeakable (1924)
- Co mój mąż robi w nocy? (1934)
- Pieśniarz Warszawy (1934)
- Second Youth (1938)
- Ostatnia brygada (1938)
- Youth of Chopin (1952)
