= The Unspeakable =

1924 film

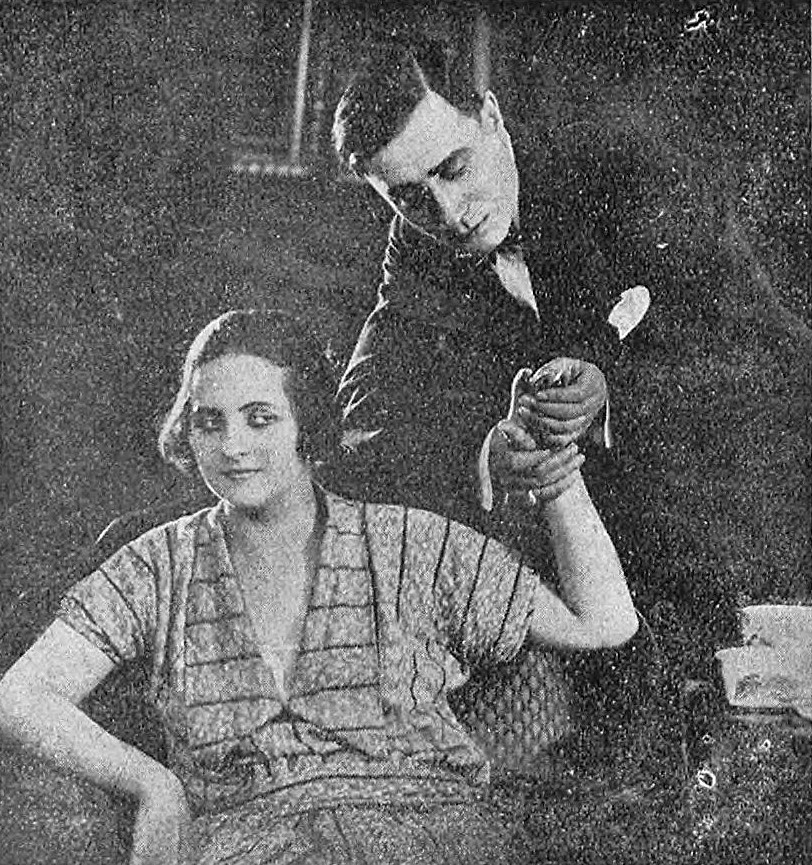
- Directed by: Edward Puchalski
- Written by: Edward Puchalski; Gabriela Zapolska (novel)
- Starring: Jadwiga Smosarska; Wanda Siemaszkowa
- Cinematography: Zbigniew Gniazdowski
- Production company: Sfinks
- Release date: 21 October 1924
- Country: Poland
- Languages: Silent; Polish intertitles

The Unspeakable (Polish: O czym się nie mówi, also O czem się nie mówi) is a 1924 Polish lost silent drama film directed by Edward Puchalski, starring Jadwiga Smosarska and Wanda Siemaszkowa. It was remade in 1939.

The film's sets were designed by the art directors Józef Galewski and Mieczysław Krawicz.

== Plot ==
Krajewski, a banking clerk, falls in love with Frania, a girl he met accidentally. Frania returns the favor, but it turns out that she is so impoverished that she works as a prostitute. She's completely dependent on her pimp, Kosz, and his partner in crime, Prysadna. The next day Krajewski meets Kosz, who treats him as a client and offers him to find and deliver a woman that Krajewski is looking for. Krajewski describes Frania, who is brought to him. Krajewski then offers Frania the prospect of a life together.

== Cast ==
- Jadwiga Smosarska as Frania Watorek 'Poranek'
- Kazimierz Justian as clerk Krajewski 'Tatuńcio'
- Wanda Siemaszkowa as Romanowa
- Władysław Grabowski as Konitz
- Stefan Jaracz as counselor Wolski
- Maria Gorczyńska as Mańka
- Wieslaw Gawlikowski as pimp Kosz
- Maria Chaveau as Prysadna
- Ludwik Fritsche as Ten, co płaci
- Maria Dulęba as Gwozdecka
- Maria Balcerkiewiczówna as "one of them"
- Justyna Czartorzyska
- Józef Węgrzyn
- Mira Zimińska
- Tadeusz Olsza
- Jan Szymanski
- Wlodzimierz Macherski

== Bibliography ==
- Skaff, Sheila. The Law of the Looking Glass: Cinema in Poland, 1896-1939. Ohio University Press, 2008.
