= Duchess of Łowicz (film) =

1932 Polish film

- Directed by: Mieczysław Krawicz; Janusz Warnecki
- Written by: Witold Brumer
- Starring: Stefan Jaracz; Jadwiga Smosarska; Józef Węgrzyn; Stanislaw Gruszczynski
- Cinematography: Zbigniew Gniazdowski
- Music by: Feliks Rybicki
- Distributed by: Jan Bratkowski
- Release dates: 4 September 1932 (Poland); 30 April 1933 (US)
- Country: Poland
- Language: Polish

Duchess of Łowicz (Polish: Księżna Łowicka), also known as November Night (Polish: Noc Listapodowa), is a Polish-language historical film directed by Mieczysław Krawicz and Janusz Warnecki, and written by Witold Brumer. It was based on a 1908 book Księżna Łowicka by Wacław Gąsiorowski. It was the first high-budget Polish-language film, and one of the first Polish-language non-silent feature films.

== Cast ==
- Stefan Jaracz - Grand Duke Constantine Pawlowicz
- Jadwiga Smosarska - Joanna Grudzinska
- Józef Węgrzyn - Major Walerian Lukasinski
- Stanislaw Gruszczynski - Alojzy Szczygiel, poet
- Amelia Rotter-Jarninska - Joanna's Mother
- Artur Socha - Lieutenant Piotr Wysocki
- Aleksander Zelwerowicz - Joanna's Father, Broniec
- Loda Niemirzanka - Chambermaid
- Jan Szymański - General Koruta
- Lucjan Zurowski - General Gendze
- Juliusz Luszczewski - Makrot, a spy
- Waclaw Pawlowski - Professor Szkaradowski
- Wanda Jarszewska - Honoratka
- Henryk Rzętkowski - Wartownik
