= Jadwiga Smosarska =

Polish actress (1898–1971)

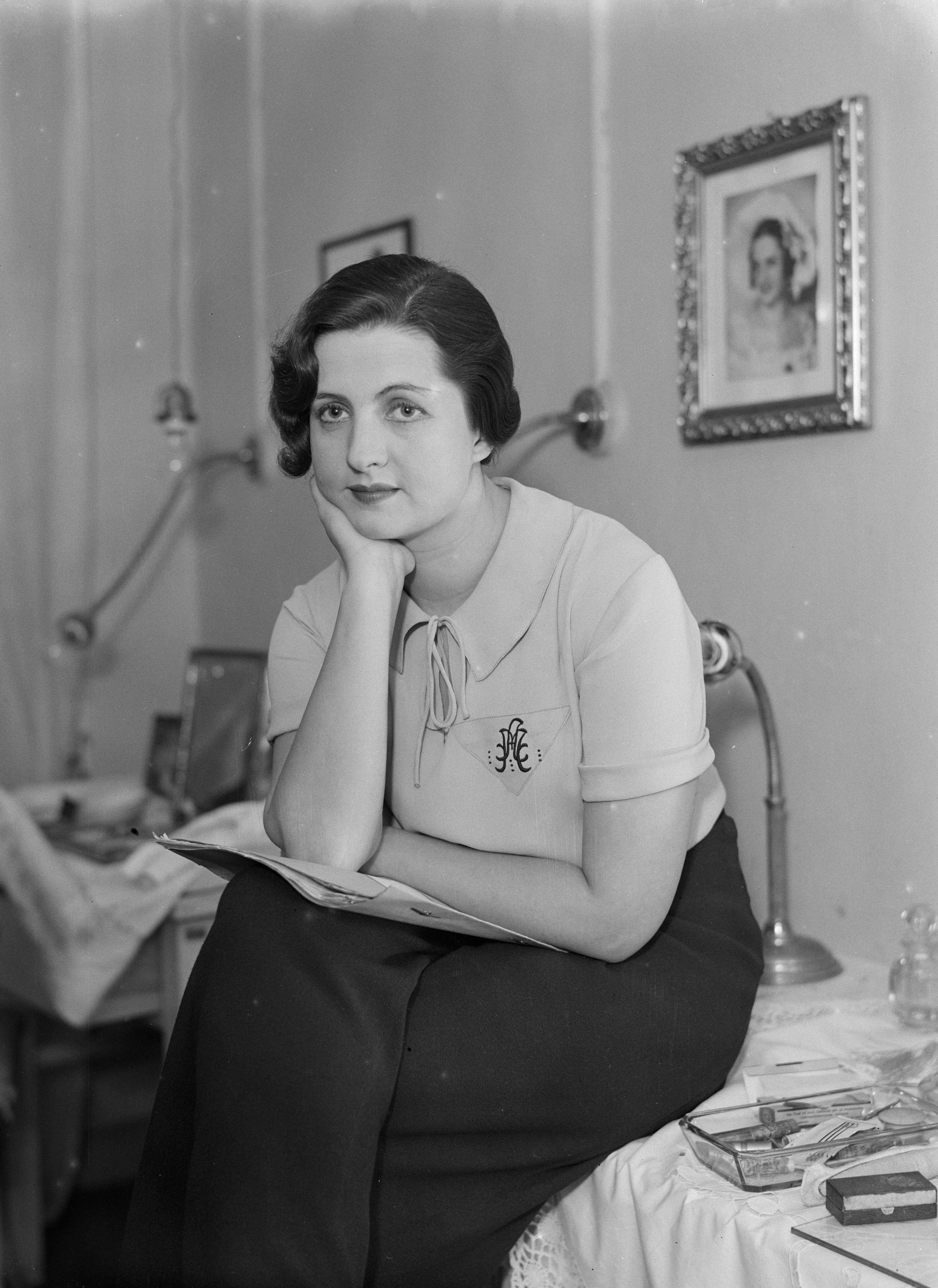
- Jadwiga Smosarska in 1934
- Born: 23 September 1898; Warsaw, Poland, Russian Empire (now Warsaw, Poland)
- Died: 1 November 1971 (aged 73); Warsaw, Poland
- Occupation: Actress
- Years active: 1919–1937

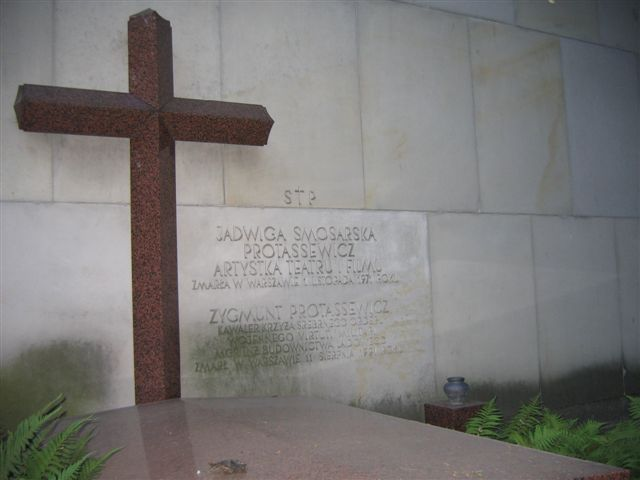
Grave of Jadwiga Smosarska and her husband Zygmunt Protassewicz at the Powązki Cemetery in Warsaw

Jadwiga Smosarska (23 September 1898 – 1 November 1971) was a Polish film actress. She appeared in more than 25 films between 1919 and 1937, as well as various stage productions.

== Biography ==
Smosarska was known for playing characters representative of Polish clichés that reflected the suffering of the country's citizens. Patriotic, romantic and in good social standing, her characters often struggled with malaise and a tragic love life. In the 1920s she rose to fame in Poland as one of Sfinks Film Studio's leading stars after Pola Negri left the country for Germany.

Smosarska fled Warsaw in 1939, seeking refuge in Lithuania before securing passage by boat to the United States through Scandinavia. Though she attempted to establish a career in Hollywood, her accent proved too much of a challenge for American film makers. In 1954 Smosarska toured parts of Canada to help raise money for welfare projects aimed at assisting Polish immigrants. Sponsored by Toronto's Advance Film Service, the trip began at Eaton Auditorium on 6 March, before stops in London, Hamilton, Ottawa, Montreal, Oshawa, Wellington and Brantford. She remained in the United States until 1970, before returning to live the final year of her life in Poland.

== Selected filmography ==
- The Unspeakable (1924)
- Trędowata (1926)
- Exile to Siberia (1930)
- Księżna Łowicka (1932)
- Prokurator Alicja Horn (1933)
- Is Lucyna a Girl? (1934)
- Two Joasias (1935)
- Barbara Radziwiłłówna (1936)
- Jadzia (1936)
- Ułan Księcia Józefa (1937)
