= Prokurator Alicja Horn =

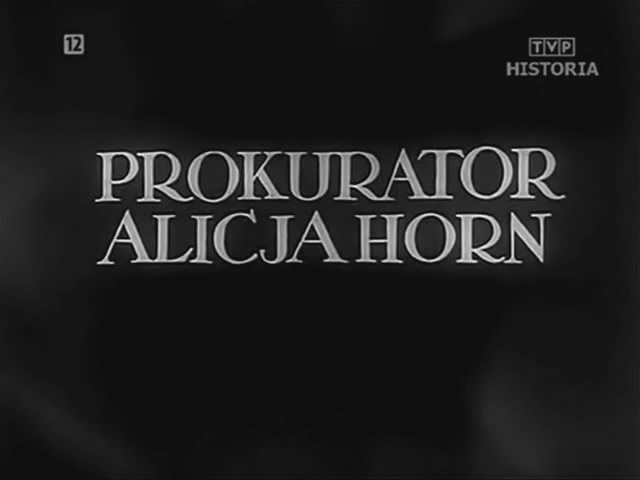
- Screenshot from polish movie "Prokurator Alicja Horn"
- Directed by: Marta Flantz and Michał Waszyński
- Written by: Tadeusz Dolega-Mostowicz (novel), Marta Flantz (writer)
- Release date: 1933
- Running time: 69 minutes
- Country: Poland
- Language: Polish

Prokurator Alicja Horn is a 1933 Polish film directed by Marta Flantz and Michał Waszyński. The film's art direction was by Jacek Rotmil.

== Cast ==
- Jadwiga Smosarska ... Alicja Horn
- Zofia Mirska ... Julka
- Franciszek Brodniewicz ... Jan Winkler
- Bogusław Samborski ... Prof. Brunicki
- Loda Halama ... Dancer
- Jan Kurnakowicz ... Journalist
- Tadeusz Fijewski ... Journalist
- Irena Skwierczyńska ... unidentified character
- Wanda Jarszewska ... unidentified character
- Wojciech Ruszkowski ... unidentified character
- Paweł Owerłło ... unidentified character
- Stanisław Grolicki ... unidentified character
