= Witold Conti =

Polish actor

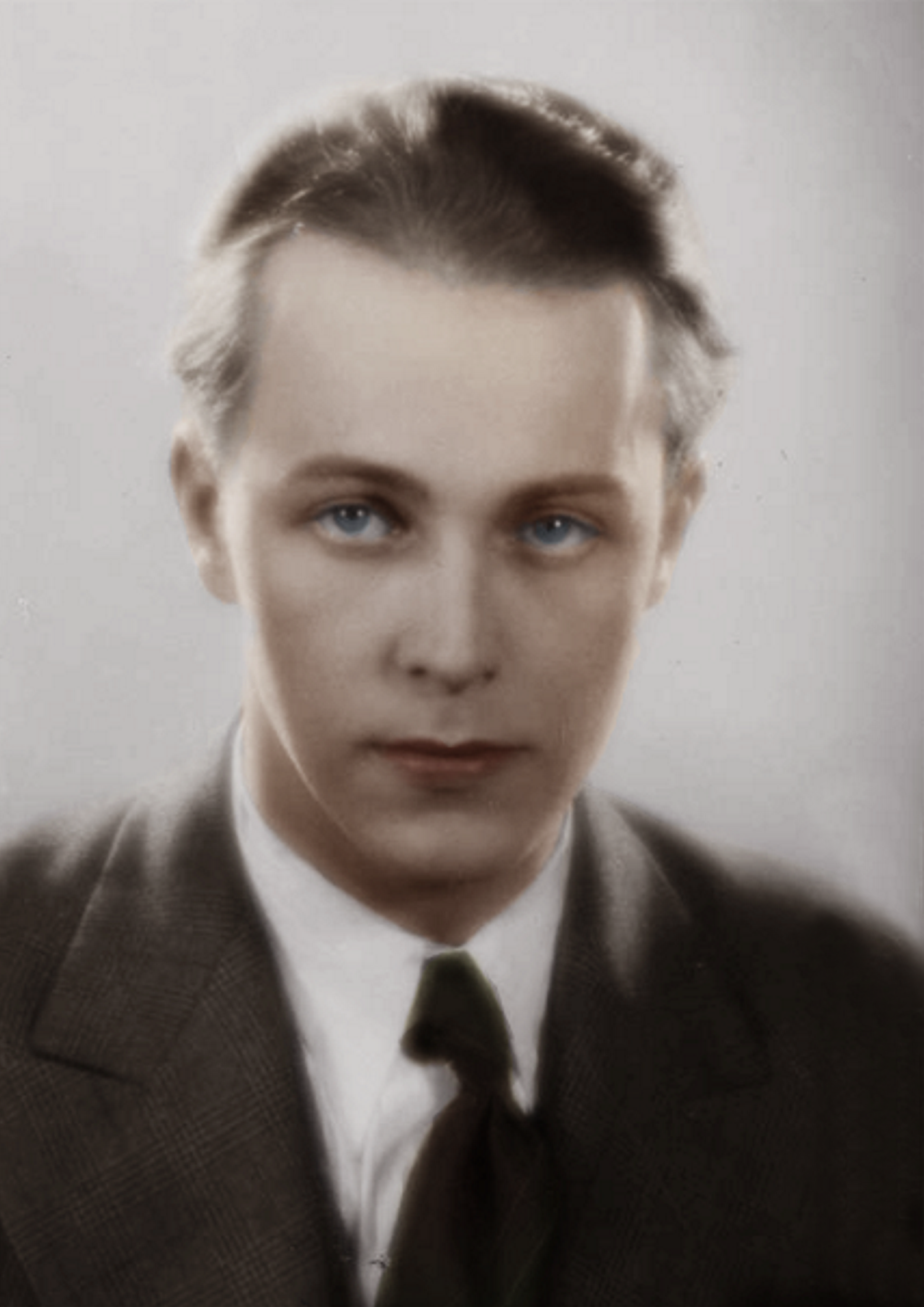
- Born: 1908; Berlin, Germany
- Died: 1944 (aged 35–36); Nice, France
- Occupation: Actor
- Years active: 1930–1937

Witold Conti (1908–1944) was a Polish film actor. He appeared in nine films between 1930 and 1937.

== Career ==
He was the son of Stanisława and Maksymilian Kozikowski. His father was the head of the State Employment Agency. In 1920, he emigrated to Poland from Germany. He studied law at the Faculty of Law of the University of Poznań, and at the same time he studied singing with professor Zygmunt Zawrocki. After some time, he moved to Paris, where he was supposed to continue his law studies, but then he began studies in the violin and vocal classes of the local music conservatory instead. During this time, he met and befriended Pola Negri. In the years 1930–1938, he performed in Warsaw revue theaters, cabarets, and in feature films (where he mainly played the leading roles of handsome lovers). He also occasionally performed at the Summer Theater and the Operetta on Karowa Street. He also performed in the programme Podwieczorek przy mikrofonie of Polskie Radio.

== Private life and Death ==
Conti had relationships with both men and women and could be considered bisexual by modern definition. At the beginning of his artistic career, he was in a relationship with an openly gay composer Karol Szymanowski. After this relationship ended, in 1938, he married Zofia Halina Margulies, daughter of Maurycy Margulies, general director of munition factory "Pocisk". After the outbreak of World War II, in September 1939, he left with his wife and son to Vilnius, from where he moved to France. During World War II, he performed there in Polish community centers. He died in Nice during the bombing by the British of the hinterland of the German army occupying this part of France. Witold Conti's funeral took place on 29 May 1944 at the Caucade cemetery in Nice.

After the war, his wife remarried to an American soldier. Their family moved to Albuquerque, where Witold's son Janusz Kozikowski grew up. Janusz became a renowned visual artist and married Nancy Kozikowski.

== Nagrody ==
- 1938: award of the Minister of Industry and Trade at the Film Festival Targi Wschodnie in Lwów for a role of lieutenant Andrzeja Zadora in a film Ułan księcia Józefa

== Selected filmography ==
- Sound of the Desert (1932)
- Każdemu wolno kochać (1933)
- Uhlan's Pledge (1934)
- The Haunted Manor (1936)
- Ułan księcia Józefa (1937)
