= Love, Cherish, Respect =

Kocha, lubi, szanuje
- Directed by: Michał Waszyński
- Written by: Napoleon Sądek
- Release date: 2 November 1934
- Country: Poland
- Language: Polish

Kocha, lubi, szanuje (English translation, Love, Cherish, Respect ) is a 1934 Polish language romantic comedy film, produced in Poland by the European subsidiary of Universal Pictures and directed by Michał Waszyński.

== Cast ==
- Eugeniusz Bodo ... Władysław, drugstore clerk
- Loda Halama ... Loda, Władysław's girl
- Zula Pogorzelska ... Servant Kunegunda
- Władysław Walter ... Franciszek, coachman
- Michał Znicz... Apothecary
- Helena Zarembina ... Apothecary's Wife
- Wojciech Ruszkowski ... Count Maurycy Stopalski
- Konrad Tom... Director
- Stanisław Sielański ... Stage Manager Strunka
- Ludwik Lawiński ... Shop owner
- Wanda Jarszewska ... Loda's housekeeper
- Paweł Owerłło ... Director of a Theater Agency
- Elżbieta Kryńska ... Secretary
- Maria Chmurkowska ... Diva Wioletta
