= Wanda Jarszewska =

Polish actress (1888–1964)

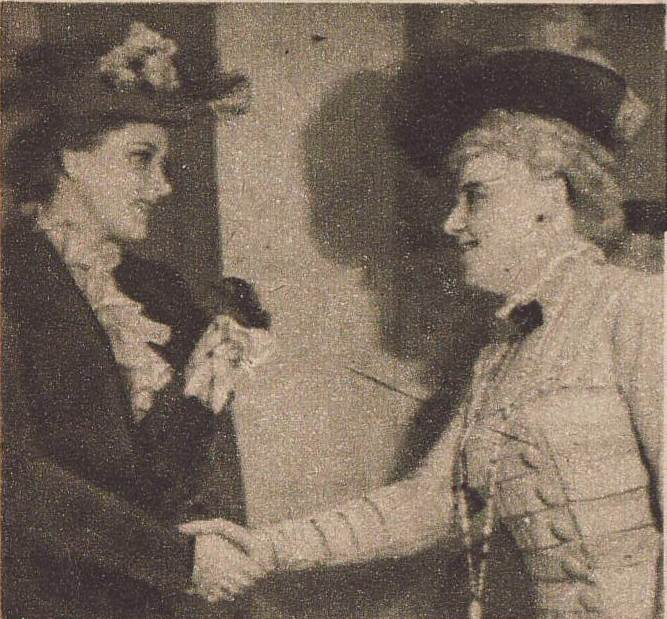
- Wanda Jarszewska with Stanisława Angel-Engelówna in 1948
- Born: 3 November 1888; Warsaw, Poland, Russian Empire (now Warsaw, Poland)
- Died: 15 May 1964 (aged 75); Warsaw, Poland
- Occupation: Actress
- Years active: 1916–1962

Wanda Jarszewska (3 November 1888 – 15 May 1964) was a Polish film actress. She appeared in more than 40 films between 1916 and 1962.

== Selected filmography ==
- The Adventures of Anton (1913)
- Pan Twardowski (1921)
- Księżna Łowicka (1932)
- Life Sentence (1933)
- Dvanáct křesel (1933)
- Prokurator Alicja Horn (1933)
- Zabawka (1933)
- Love, Cherish, Respect (1934)
- Uhlan's Pledge (1934)
- Police Chief Antek (1935)
- Będzie lepiej (1936)
- The Leper (1936)
- 30 karatów szczęścia (1936)
- American Adventure (1936)
- Augustus the Strong (1936)
- Znachor (1937)
- A Diplomatic Wife (1937)
- Niedorajda (1937)
- The Line (1938)
- Heather (1938)
- Second Youth (1938)
- Doctor Murek (1939)
