= Stanisław Szebego =

Polish film director and composer

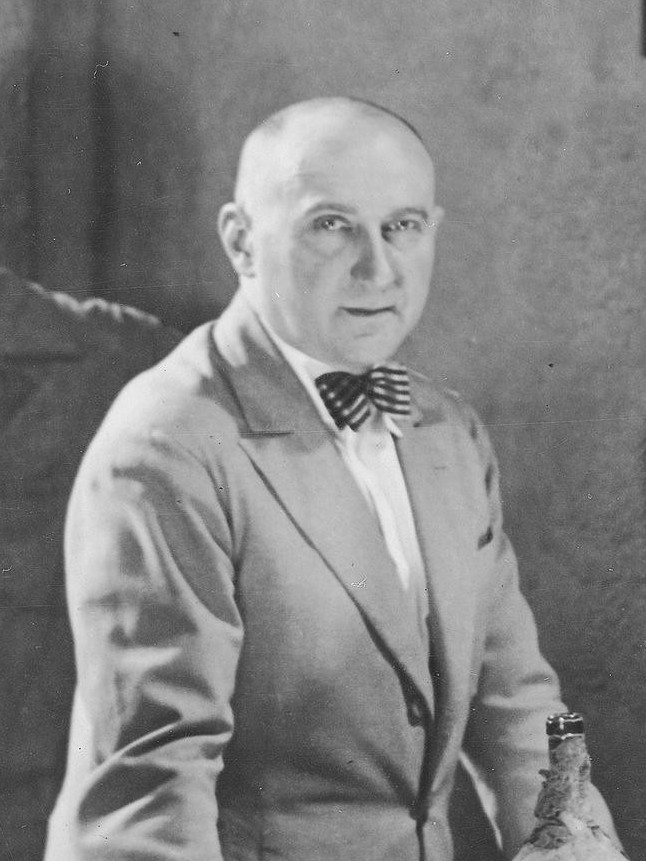
- Szebego in 1932
- Born: Stanisław Finkelsztajn ca 1891; Warsaw
- Died: 1944; Warsaw
- Occupations: film director and producer, music composer
- Years active: 1916-1939

Stanisław Szebego (c. 1891 – 1944) was a Polish film producer, director and composer.

== Life ==
Szebego was born in Warsaw ca. 1891, under the name Stanisław Finkelsztajn. In 1916 he worked as an assistant director on the film Studenci (Students), since then he has worked on subsequent films mainly as an assistant director and director of photography, although in 1919 he appeared in front of the camera in the film Ludzie bez jutra. In 1930 together with Mieczysław Krawicz and Zbigniew Gniazdowski they established a movie production company "Blok". After the establishing of Blok Szebego worked primarily as a production manager, but in 1937 he directed Książątko (Princeling). Szebego was also a dance music composer, he wrote a tango Blondyneczka (Little Blonde Woman) and a foxtrot Od miłości nikt się nie wykręci (Nobody will get away from love) used in a film Dwie Joasie (Two Joannas). He collaborated many times with Mieczysław Krawicz, being called by the press "[Krawicz's] brave companion". Szebego did not hide his homosexuality in the artistic circles, but his relation with Krawicz was probably just a friendship.

In 1940-1942 Stanisław Szebego as a Jew was detained in the Warsaw ghetto, where he acted in the Nowy Teatr Kameralny. In March 1942 he and the actor Michał Znicz celebrated a 25-year anniversary of their artistic careers. Before the ghetto extermination in July 1942 r. Szebego and Znicz were freed by their friends, with Szebego being given a hiding spot by Krawicz.

== Death ==
Stanisław Szebego died in the Warsaw Uprising.
