= Loda Halama =

Polish dancer and actress (1911–1996)

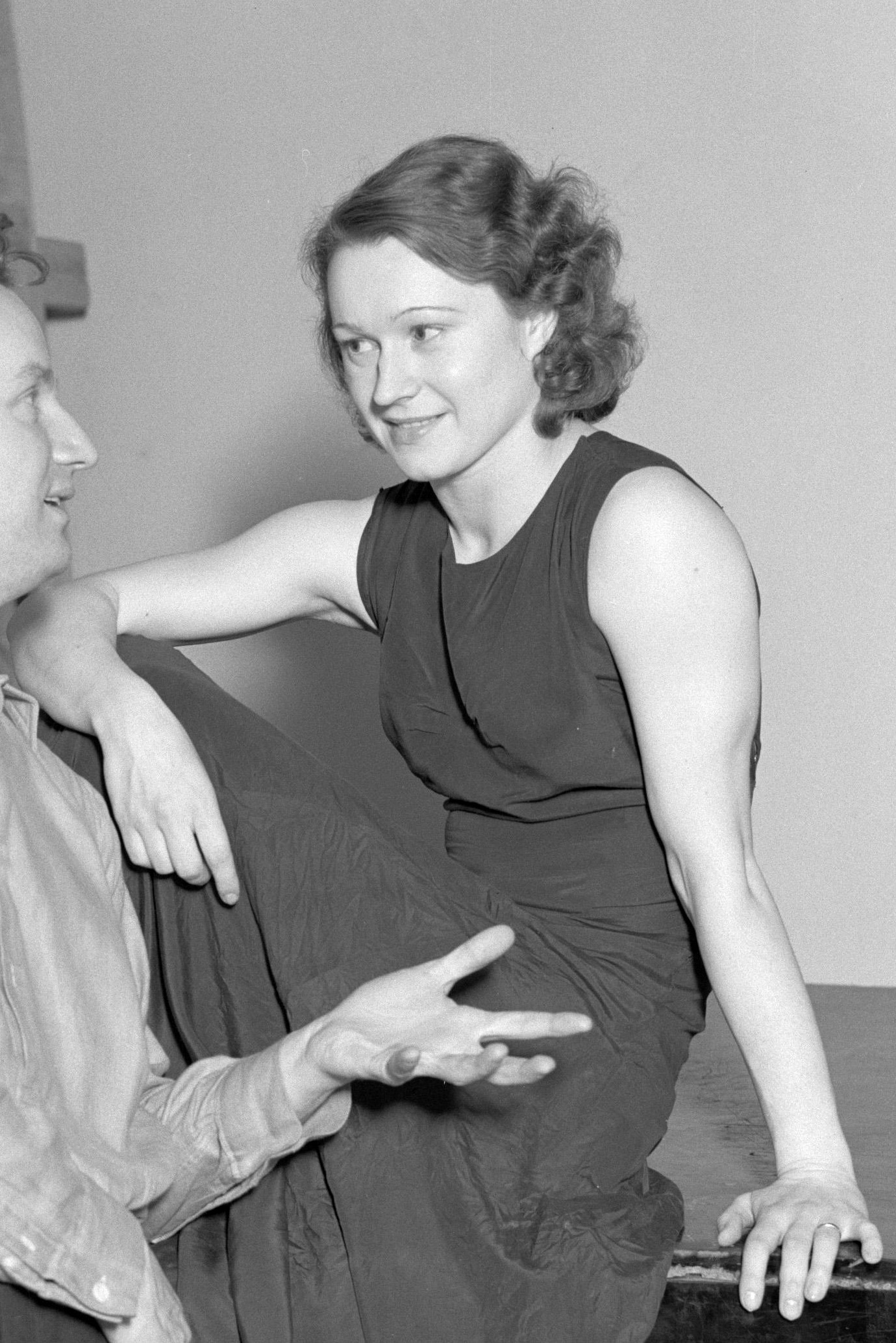
- Loda Halama in 1934
- Born: Leokadia Halama; 20 July 1911; Czerwińsk nad Wisłą, Poland, Russian Empire (now Czerwińsk nad Wisłą, Poland)
- Died: 13 July 1996 (aged 84); Warsaw, Poland
- Occupations: Dancer, actress
- Years active: 1927–1950

Loda Halama (20 July 1911 – 13 July 1996) was a Polish dancer and actress. She was the Principal dancer of Grand Theatre, Warsaw (1934–1936). She appeared in eleven films between 1927 and 1950.

== Selected filmography ==
- Prokurator Alicja Horn (1933)
- Love, Cherish, Respect (1934)
- Augustus the Strong (1936)
- A Diplomatic Wife (1937)
- Krystyna's Lie (1939)
