= Mieczysław Krawicz =

Polish film director

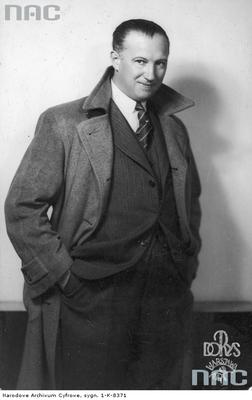
Mieczysław Krawicz (1934)

Mieczysław Krawicz (2 February 1892 in Warsaw – 17 September 1944 in Warsaw) was a Polish film director.

== Life ==
He was born on 2 February 1892 in Warsaw, in the Catholic family of Juliusz and Antonina (1857–1941). He graduated from high school and the Higher Trade Courses in Warsaw. After returning home from further studies in Germany, he started working with the "Sfinks" film company. Initially, he dealt with office matters, later designing film decorations, organizing shooting and production, ending with directing. In 1926 he played the role of Brochwicz in the adaptation of Trędowata. In 1930, together with Stanisław Szebego and Zbigniew Gniazdowski, they founded the "Blok" film company, in which he initially acted as production manager and then a film director. From 1930 he was the vice-president of the Film Producers Union, he was also the Secretary General of the Supreme Council of the Film Industry in Poland.

In the 1930s, he collaborated with many Jewish producers and directors, which sparked rumors that Krawicz himself was to be a Jew. In October 1939, the anti-Semitic one-day magazine "W natarciu" published these rumors as fact. Despite this, during the occupation, the director managed have his two films (Sportowiec mimo woli and Ja tu rządzę, filmed before the war) shown in cinemas. In occupied Warsaw, Krawicz ran a philatelic shop at ul. Marszałkowska 114. He was suspected of collaborating with the Abwehr and was spied on by Polish counter-intelligence, but a Polish investigation from 1951 showed that Krawicz was hiding his Jewish former associate, Stanisław Szebego, in his apartment. It is suggested that the director maintained "proper" relations with Germans in order to avoid any suspicions of this.

Mieczysław Krawicz was the head of the cinematographers who filmed the Warsaw Uprising. On 13 September 1944 he was seriously wounded in the head after a bomb blast, while he was on the balcony of his apartment at ul. Lwowska 8. He died 4 days later in a field hospital of his injuries. He was buried in a collective insurgent grave at ul. Lwowska 13; later exhumed and buried in Powązki (quarter 304-6-13).

Little is known about his private life - it is known that he was married and later divorced, according to the reports of Polish counter-intelligence, "his wife left him when she discovered that he was homosexual".

== Filmography ==
- Grzeszna miłość (1929)
- Szlakiem hańby (1929)
- The Ten from Pawiak Prison (1931)
- Księżna Łowicka (1932)
- Ułani, ułani, chłopcy malowani (1932)
- Każdemu wolno kochać (1933)
- Szpieg w masce (1933)
- Uhlan's Pledge (1934)
- Is Lucyna a Girl? (1934)
- Two Joasias (1935)
- Jadzia (1936)
- Jego wielka miłość (1936)
- A Diplomatic Wife (1937)
- Niedorajda (1937)
- Skłamałam (1937)
- Moi rodzice rozwodzą się (1938)
- Paweł i Gaweł (1938)
- Robert i Bertrand (1938)
- Ja tu rządzę (1939)
- O czym się nie mówi... (1939)
- A Sportsman Against His Will (1940)
