= Mira Zimińska =

Polish actress (1901–1997)

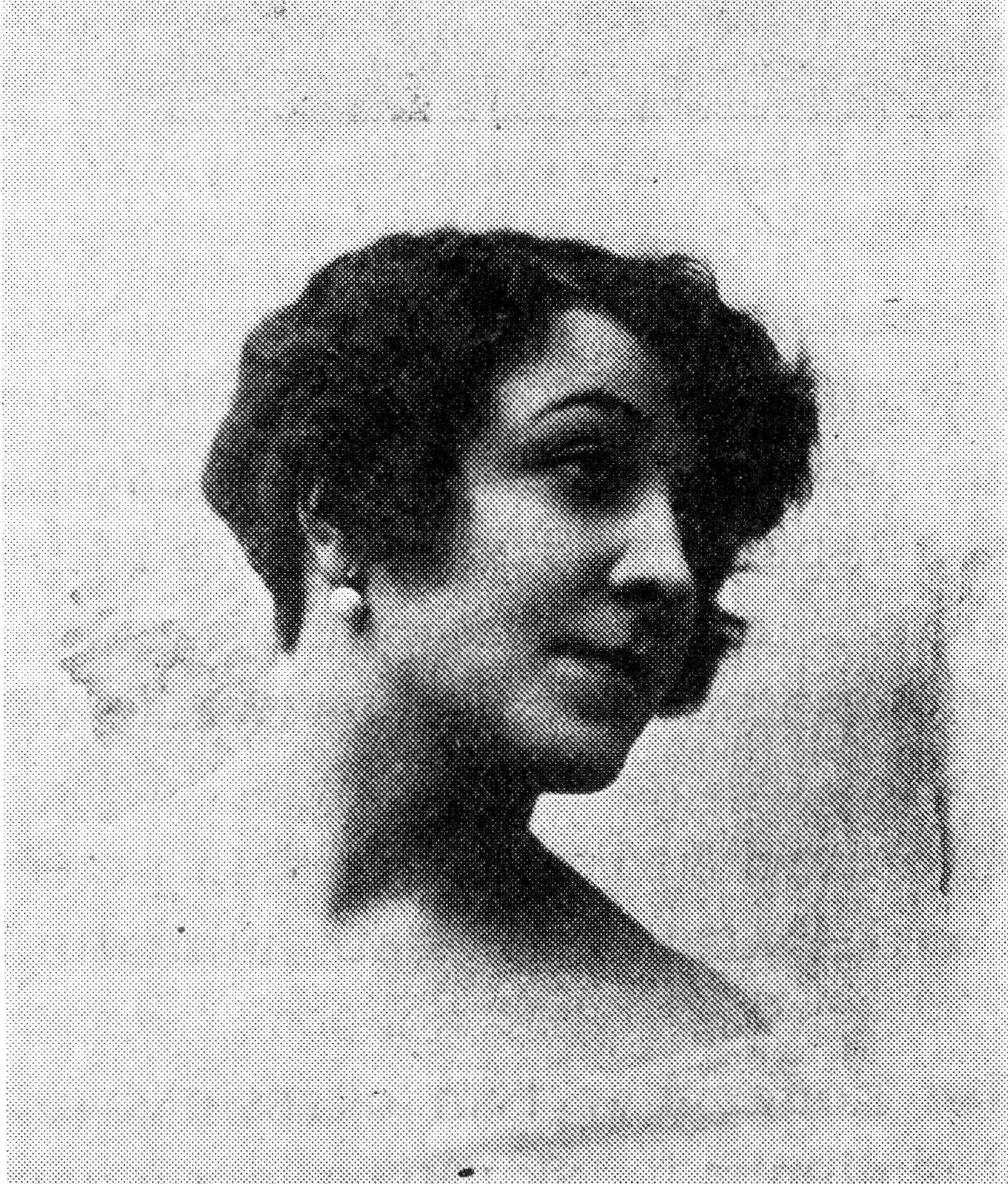
- Mira Zimińska-Sygietyńska
- Born: 22 February 1901; Płock, Płock Governorate, Congress Poland
- Died: 26 January 1997 (aged 95); Warsaw, Poland
- Occupations: actress, singer, director
- Years active: 1918–1997
- Spouses: Jan Zimiński (1917–1920), Tadeusz Sygietyński (1954–1955)

Mira Zimińska-Sygietyńska (born Marianna Magdalena Burzyńska; 22 February 1901 – 26 January 1997) was a Polish stage and film actress. She was the founder and long-time director of the Mazowsze folk group. She was awarded the Order of the White Eagle, Poland's highest military and civilian honour, in 1996.

== Personal ==
Zimińska was born in Płock in central Poland as the daughter of Jakub Burzyński. Unofficially, the actress gave the year 1895 as her date of birth. She was associated with the theatre since childhood. Her parents worked in the Płock theatre: Her mother was an usherette and buffet server, and her father was a set decorator. She made her theatre debut at the age of seven as the Child in Ich cztero by Gabriela Zapolska. Her successful performance meant that she was then entrusted with other roles.

At the age of 16, she married Jan Grzegorz Zimiński, a singing teacher who led the orchestra of the Płock theatre. The couple separated in 1920, but officially divorced only in 1953.

In 1954 she married Tadeusz Sygietyński. After his death in 1955, she became a director of Mazowsze.

She died in 1997 and is buried together with her husband in the Avenue of Merit of the Powązki Military Cemetery in Warsaw.

== Pre World War II ==
During her performances at the Polish Theatre in Radom, she was noticed and hired by one of the owners of the Warsaw Qui Pro Quo theatre, then one of the most popular Polish cabarets. In 1919, she moved to Warsaw. In the years 1918–1939, she performed as an actress and singer, among others, in "Qui Pro Quo", "Morski Oko", "Banda", " Cyrulik Warszawski ", "Ali Baba", Teatr Kameralny. Sometimes, she also served as emcee, as was the case during the performance in Hallo! Ciotka!, when her charm combined with verve and sharp wit won the audience over. Zimińska became a favourite of the intelligentsia. She was one of the first Polish female motorists. She drove luxury Mercedes cars and a red Bugatti convertible, famous in Warsaw at the time.

In 1929, she made her debut as a stage actress, appearing at the Polish Theatre in Artystach. Her dramatic roles quickly won her recognition from both critics and audiences. In the years 1928–38 and 1946–48, she performed both drama and comedy in Warsaw's Polski, Ateneum, and Kameralny theatres.

In 1934, she edited the satirical column Duby smalone in "Kurier Poranny" and, together with Stefan Jaracz and Karol Benda, ran the Actor's Theatre.

She also successfully appeared in films. She made her debut in the silent film era. She appeared mainly in comedic roles, for example Ada! to nie wypada!, Papa się żeni, and Manewry miłosne.

She also recorded albums for Syrena Rekord, Columbia Records, and Polskie Nagrania. In 1938, she performed a stage program with Eugeniusz Bodo.

== World War II ==
During the German occupation, Zimińska was a member of the Polish Home Army. She also wrote anti-Nazi songs for Warsaw newspapermen. In 1942, she was arrested and imprisoned in Pawiak Prison. After her release (thanks to the efforts of her husband and Adolf Dymsza), she performed in so-called public theatres such as the "Złoty Ulu".

During the Warsaw Uprising, she was a nurse in a hospital and performed in the Home Army Front Theatre. After the suppression of the Uprising, she was in a camp in Pruszków, from where she was sent to Tarczyn together with Sygietyński. They both reappeared in Warsaw just after the city was occupied by Soviet and Polish troops.

== Postwar ==
In 1947, her role in the play Żołnierz królowej Madagaskaru (Soldier of the Queen of Madagascar), despite its great success, was Zimińska's farewell to the stage, from which she left at the peak of her fame.

In 1948, together with Tadeusz Sygietyński, she founded the State Folk Song and Dance Ensemble "Mazowsze". In 1955, after Sygietyński's death, Zimińska became the artistic director of the ensemble, and from 1957 she was its director.

She was the founder and originator of the Children's Song and Dance Ensemble "Varsovia", based in Warsaw (called "Little Mazowsze"). The ensemble has existed since 1978 to the present.

She was a distinguished member of ZASP ("Związek Artystów Scen Polskich"), the Association of Polish Stage Artists.

== Filmography ==
- 1922 – Wszystko się kręci
- 1924 – The Unspeakable
- 1925 – Iwonka
- 1926 – The Unthinkable
- 1930 – Exile to Siberia
- 1930 – Paramount on Parade (Polish version only)
- 1933 – Każdemu wolno kochać
- 1935 – Manewry miłosne
- 1936 – Papa się żeni
- 1936 – Ada! To nie wypada!
- 1951 – Warsaw Premiere (story idea)
