= Tola Mankiewiczówna =

Polish singer and actress (1900–1985)

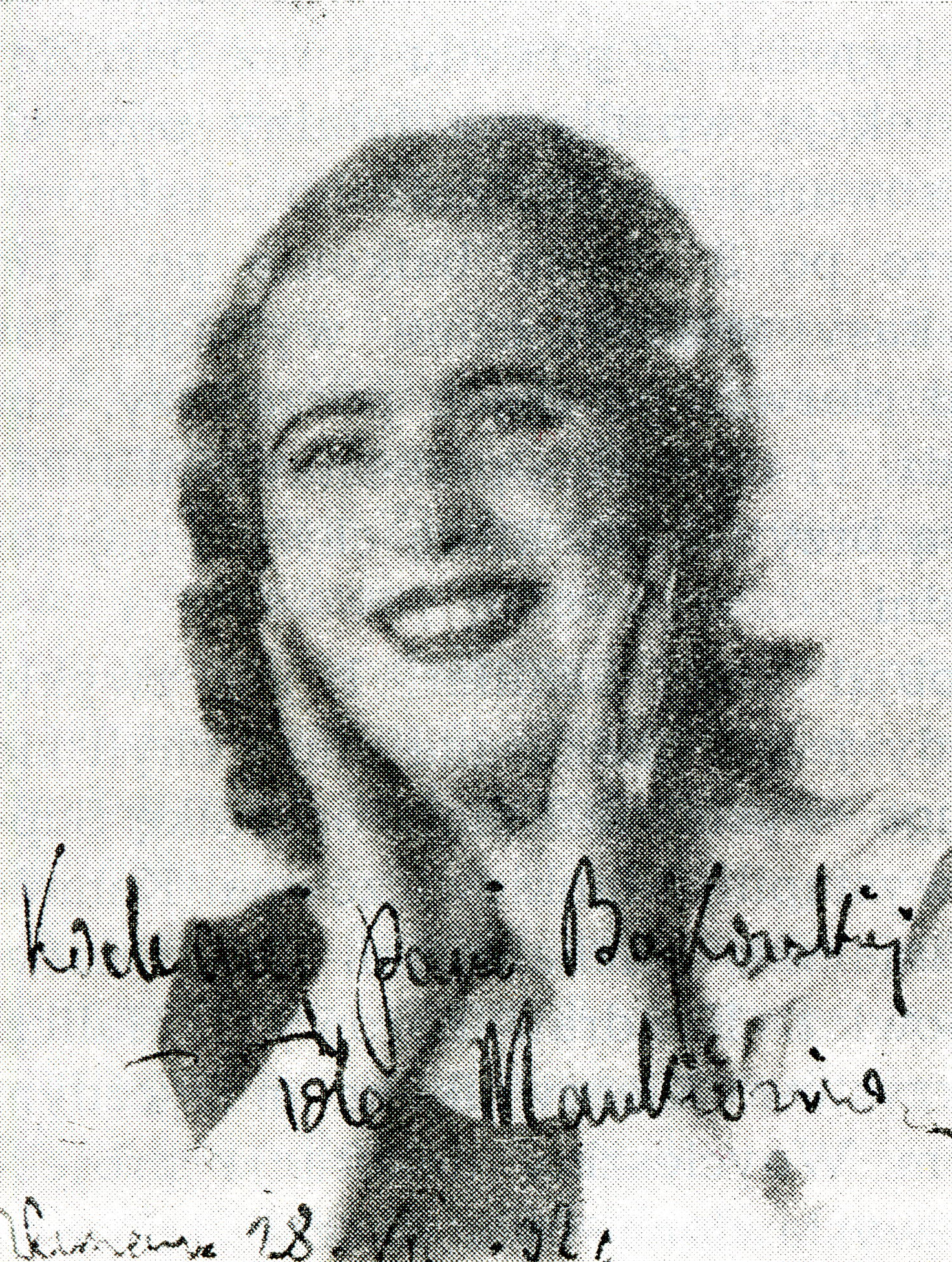
- Born: Teodora Oleksa; 8 May 1900; Bronowo, Congress Poland
- Died: 27 October 1985 (aged 85); Warsaw, Poland
- Occupations: Singer, actress
- Years active: 1921-1975

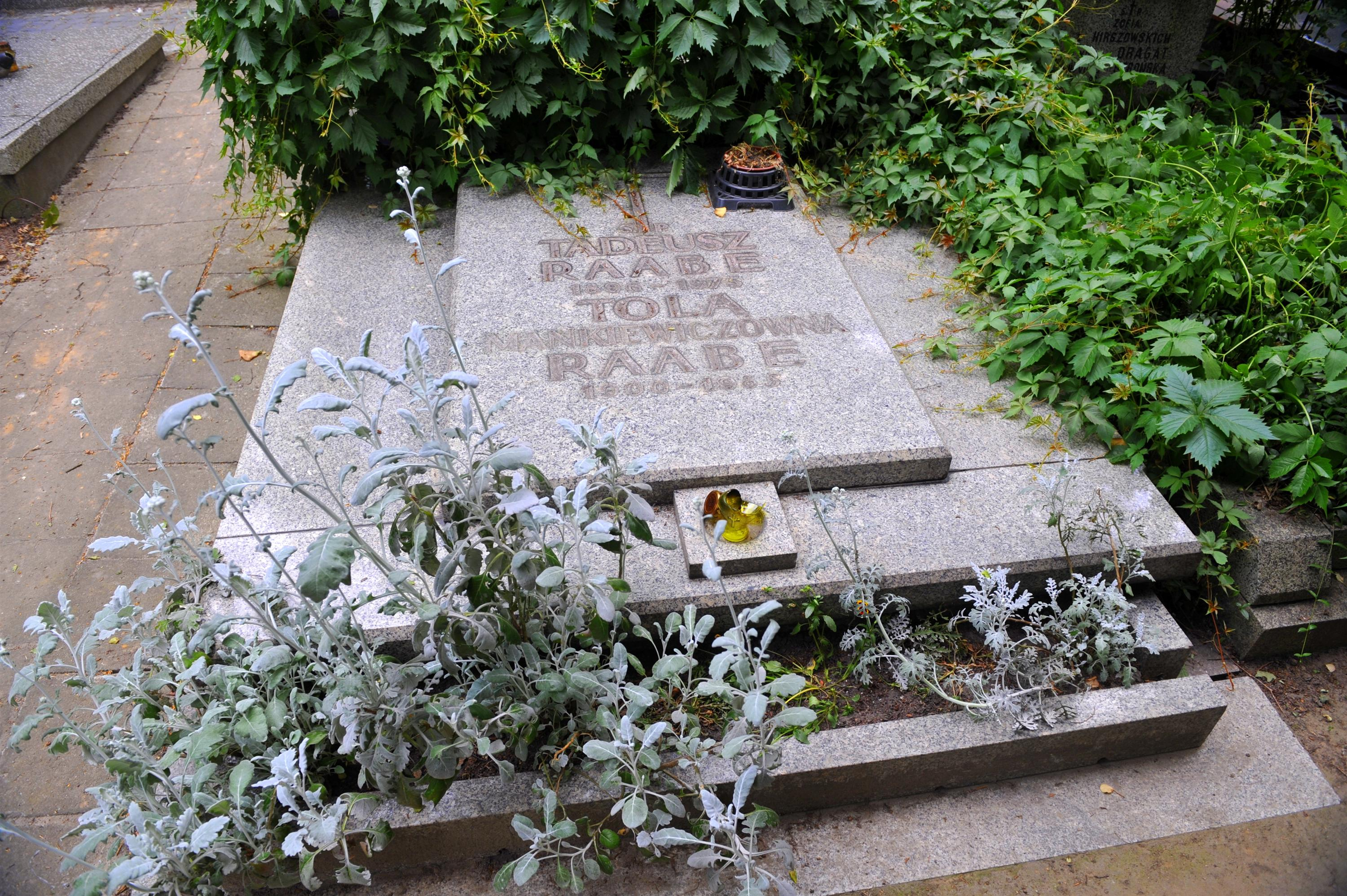
Grave of Mankiewiczówna at the Protestant Reformed Cemetery in Warsaw

Tola Mankiewiczówna (8 May 1900 – 27 October 1985) was a Polish singer and actress. She has recorded albums for such labels as: Columbia, Syrena and Estar. During the war, these recordings were lost and Mankiewiczówna never regained them.

== Selected filmography ==
- Ten Percent for Me (1933)
- Co mój mąż robi w nocy (1934)
- Uhlan's Pledge (1934)
- Parade of the Reservists (1934)
- Miss Minister Is Dancing (1937)
