= Jerzy Jurandot =

Polish poet (1911–1979)

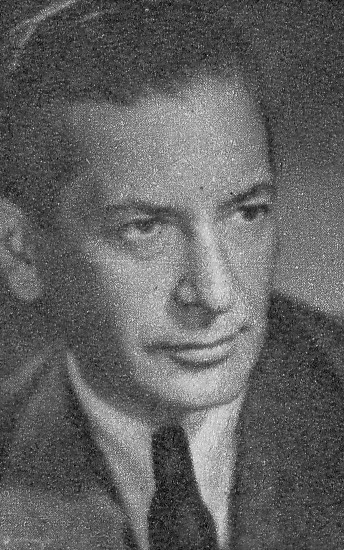
- Jerzy Jurandot (1955)
- Born: 19 March 1911; Warsaw, Russian Partition
- Died: 16 August 1979 (aged 68); Warsaw, Poland
- Occupations: Poet, dramatist, satirist
- Spouse: Stefania Grodzieńska
- Website: https://www.imdb.com/name/nm0973225/

Jerzy Jurandot, born Jerzy Glejgewicht (19 March 1911 – 16 August 1979), was a popular Polish poet of Jewish ancestry, dramatist, satirist and songwriter.

== History ==
Jurandot was born and died in Warsaw. He first became successful at the end of the 1920s, and in 1930s grew in popularity. As writer, he co-founded the cabarets Qui Pro Quo and Cyrulik warszawski as well as contributed to other theatres such as Morskie Oko and Banda. He also wrote dialog for the films such as Ada to nie wypada, Manewry miłosne and Pani minister tańczy.

In 1942 he became the literary manager of the revue-theatre Femina in the Warsaw Ghetto, working with composer Ivo Wesby. He escaped before the Ghetto liquidation and hid with his non-Jewish friends at an estate in Mory near the city. After World War II Jurandot created and managed the satirical theatre Syrena (Mermaid): between 1945–50 and 1955–57. In 1952-55 he acted as director of the Satirical Theatre (Teatr Satyryków) in Warsaw.

He was the husband of writer, actress and satirist Stefania Grodzieńska.

== Works ==
- Theater pieces
  - Plecy - (1945)
  - Takie czasy - (1954)
  - Trzeci dzwonek - (1958)
  - Mąż Fołtasiówny - (1960)
  - Operacja Sodoma, czyli dziewiąty sprawiedliwy - (1962)
  - Pamiątkowa fotografia - (1966)
  - Rachunek nieprawdopodobieństwa - (1971)
- Contributions
  - Dzieje śmiechu - 1959
