= Zygmunt Białostocki =

Polish musician and composer

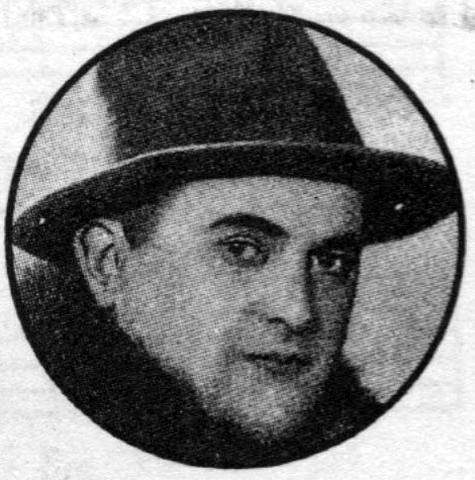
- Born: 15 August 1897; Białystok, Poland
- Died: c. 1942; Warsaw Ghetto, Warsaw, Poland
- Occupations: Composer, pianist, conductor, music director
- Years active: 1920s–1939
- Spouse: Sofia Białostocka

Zygmunt Białostocki (15 August 1897 – c. 1942) was a Polish Jewish musician and composer. He composed many popular Polish pre-war songs and worked as a conductor and a première pianist in Warsaw between the World Wars.

== Life ==
Zygmunt Białostocki was born in Białystok, Poland. He received musical training as a pianist, and between 1925 and 1930 he worked as music director and conductor in the Municipal Theatre in Łódź. Later he moved to Warsaw, where he worked in "revue-theaters" and cabarets (within what is known in Yiddish as kleynkunst), including Perskie Oko, Morskie Oko, Nowy Momus, and Nowy Ananas.

He worked with the lyricist Zenon Friedwald (Zenon Frivald-Vardan). His song M’ken nisht tsvingen tsu keyn libe was popularized by the film actor and singer Eugeniusz Bodo in the Polish version called Nie można kogoś zmuszać do miłości. His tango, Rebeka, built on Chasidic motifs and sung by Chasidic Jews as a zemer was popular in nightclubs, coffee houses, and restaurants across Warsaw between the wars. The lyrics were written by Andrzej Włast; the song was first recorded by Zofia Terne (1932) and premiered at the Morskie Oko cabaret, performed by Dora Kalinówna.

In 1932 he was the music director and composer of the score for the Biała trucizna (White Venom) movie. In 1933 he worked as accompanist in the Warsaw Nowy Momus and Oasis cabarets, in the Warsaw-Prague Perskie Oko cabaret, and in the Warsaw Nowy Ananas theater. His musical comedy called Miłość i złoto (Love and gold), written with Józef Haftman, opened in December 1933 at the Teatr 8:30.

Apart from Rebeka, Białostocki's other szlagiery (hits) included:

- foxtrots: Ach, te Rumunki, Katiusza, Andriusza, Ecie-pecie (lyrics by himself);
- tangos: Jesienne marzenia, Andrusowskie tango, Pomalutku, po cichutku (lyrics by Andrzej Włast), Szczęście trzeba rwać jak świeże wiśnie, and Zoboth (lyrics by W. Jastrzębiec). and Choć goło lecz wesoło (lyrics by Alexander Jellin), Nasze kawalerskie, Noc jesienna (lyrics by Zbigniew Drabik Argus, 1936), Na dnie serca, Nie można zmuszać do miłości, Pieśń o matce (Song about mother) (lyrics by Tadeusz Zeromski and Jerzy Wrzos, sung by Stefan Witas, 1933).

His wife, Sofia, was also a composer and a talented singer who used to sing Gypsy love songs.

After the German invasion of Poland in 1939 and the German occupation of Poland the Białostockis were forced to live in the ghetto in Warsaw. They are mentioned in Stanisław Adler's Warsaw ghetto memoir, Adler’s account specifically mentions that Białostocki was a pianist living on the sixth floor of Adler’s building and that he was “always ready to play any compositions on the piano, especially among good company and vodka.”

Zygmunt Białostock and his wife were murdered by Germans during the liquidation of the Warsaw Ghetto, most probably in 1942.

== See also ==
- Music of Poland
- List of Poles
