= Co mój mąż robi w nocy =

1934 Polish film

- Directed by: Michał Waszyński
- Written by: Emanuel Schlechter (dialogue), Anatol Stern (writer)
- Release date: 1934
- Running time: 70 minutes
- Country: Poland
- Language: Polish

Co mój mąż robi w nocy (What Is My Husband Doing Tonight?) is a 1934 Polish musical comedy film directed by Michał Waszyński.

== Plot ==
Industrialist Roman Tarski moves from Kraków to Warsaw. He is a co-owner of a thriving construction company "Żel-Beton", but one day the other partner runs away with the company's money. Tarski tries to make ends meet, but this task is very difficult because his wife, Stefa, does not know about the new situation and is having fun as before. Tarski sells his wife's jewelry, while the bailiff seizes the movable property of their home. Their maid's fiancé is the waiter, from whom Tarski accidentally learns that the waiter always has money. Faced with this perspective, he takes a job as a waiter for the Alhambra night dance. In addition, he simulates a break-in into his own home, during which he allegedly lost money and jewels from the box. The new job, which Roman Stefie is not talking about, consumes whole nights, which causes her anxiety and suspicions of betrayal. One day he catches Tarski playing with their maid. So she asks her admirer, Baron Lolo, to find out what her husband is doing at night. After many adventures and misunderstandings, everything ends happily and the dishonest partner is caught. Thanks to this, Tarski gets his money back.

== Cast ==
- Michał Znicz ... Roman Tarski
- Maria Gorczyńska ... Stefa Tarska
- Kazimierz Krukowski ... Baron Lolo Karolescu
- Tola Mankiewiczówna ... Kazia, maid
- Wojciech Ruszkowski ... Walery, a waiter
- Romuald Gierasieński ... Fafula, headwaiter and Kasia's father
- Wiktor Biegański ... Dr. Djagnozinski
- Konrad Tom ... The Private Detective
- Paweł Owerłło ... Manager of the 'Alhambra'
- Fryderyk Jarossy ... Mr. Picknick
- Elżbieta Barszczewska ... Kobieta na dancingu
- Eugeniusz Koszutski ... Workman
- Julia Krzewiński ... Tenant
- Kazimierz Pawłowski ... Mężczyzna na dancingu
