= Second Youth (1938 film) =

1938 film by Michał Waszyński

Druga młodość
- Directed by: Michał Waszyński
- Written by: Henry Bataille (play Maman Colibri), Anatol Stern (screenplay)
- Release date: 1938
- Running time: 80 minutes
- Country: Poland
- Language: Polish

Second Youth or Druga młodość is a 1938 Polish romantic drama film directed by Michał Waszyński.

== Cast ==
- Maria Gorczyńska... Irena Mohort
- Kazimierz Junosza-Stępowski ... Ludwik Mohort
- Witold Zacharewicz ... Jerzy Oledzki
- Mieczysław Cybulski ... Ryszard Mohort
- Wlodzimierz Lozinski ... Pawel Mohort
- Michał Znicz ... Klaudiusz
- Elzbieta Krynska ... Janina
- Mieczysława Ćwiklińska ... Janina's Mother
- Stanisława Wysocka ... Jerzy's Grandmother
- Tamara Wiszniewska... Tamara Korska
- Wanda Jarszewska ... Tamara's Mother
- Paweł Owerłło ... Tamara's Father
- Stefan Hnydziński ... Butler
- Henryk Malkowski ... Professor, party guest (as H. Malkowski)
