= Zenon Friedwald =

Ludwig Zenon Friedwald (Louis Fox, Zenon Frivald-Vardan, Wardan; 17 April 1906 in Lviv – 3 December 1976 in Tel Aviv) was a Polish Israeli writer, artist, and lyricist.

He wrote the lyrics for Ta ostatnia niedziela (The Last Sunday), Zakochany księżyc, and Zygmunt Białostocki's hit M'ken nisht tsvingen tsu keyn libe.

In September 1939, Friedwald, who worked at the Polish Ministry Of Military Affairs, was evacuated to Romania and later to Greece, Turkey, and finally Israel. He became a key figure in post-war Polish-Jewish circles in Israel.
