= Bal u Starego Joska =

"Bal u starego Joska" (Bal na Gnojnej) is a waltz ballad by the Polish-Russian composer, Fanny Gordon, and lyricists, Julian Krzewiński and Leopold Brodziński. It is a popular Polish song in the piosenka apaszowska or apache songs genre which arose in the Polish underworld of the 1930s. The song was written around 1934 for one of Warsaw's literary cabaret theatres. The theatres were frequented by the Polish intelligentsia.

== Background ==
The song belongs to a genre called piosenki apaszowskie which has its origin in the street songs of the French Apaches underworld. The Polish word apasz describes a member of the Warsaw underworld. The lyrics are in stylized Warsaw slang similar to Parisian argot. The French singer, Aristide Bruant was a proponent of the Los Apaches genre.

The song describes a violent party at a café on Gnojna Street in Warsaw (now 7 Rynkowa (Market street)). The street was in the heart of the vibrant Warsaw Jewish district. The café was run by Gruby Josek until 1932. It was popular among traders and porters from the nearby Hala Mirowska (food market). Writers and politicians would also visit late at night after Warsaw's exclusive restaurants were closed.

The text was written for one of Warsaw theatres or cabaret revues. Both the composer Fanny Gordon and the lyricists Julian Krzewiński and Leopold Brodziński were creators of the first Polish operetta, Yacht of Love (English title, New York Baby), which played at the "8.30 pm Theatre".

In January 1933, the Morskie Oko theatre presented Dodatek Nadzwyczajny (Special Edition) which was set in the alleys and taverns of Warsaw. One scene took place at the U Joska na Gnojnej cafe.

The song remains a popular Polish underground ballad, often sung in the specific dialect of the Praga district.

== Lyrics ==
Sleepless nights in Warsaw's quarter
I still trace them on my lips
At the Fatty Josek's tavern on the Dung Street
Gathered flower of the night.

Without food and without sleep,
as long as there is a drink
When the music plays its song
You have to dance and have to live!

Its notes, accordion, at three-quarter plays,
The gang is dancing, move away!
With reverence 'cause it won't be all that good,
When the Dung Street dances hard

Who knows Tony feels respect
There was one who did not know
And he ended for this reason
Finished in the darkly, darkly grave.

Lanterns in the dark are lit
Watchman sadly whistles song
Hangman close to gallows waits
For Tony's fate is coming soon

Its notes accordion on three-quarter sobs
The gang is dancing I am not
Why are they dancing on the Dung Street
When more than one pair is gone?

== Recordings ==
The first recording of the song was performed by Tadeusz Faliszewski. It was published in about 1934 by the leading Polish record company of that time, Syrena Rekord. Ron Davis recorded jazz versions of "Bal u starego Joska" on his album, My Mother's Father's Song (2010).
