= Fanny Gordon =

Polish-Soviet composer

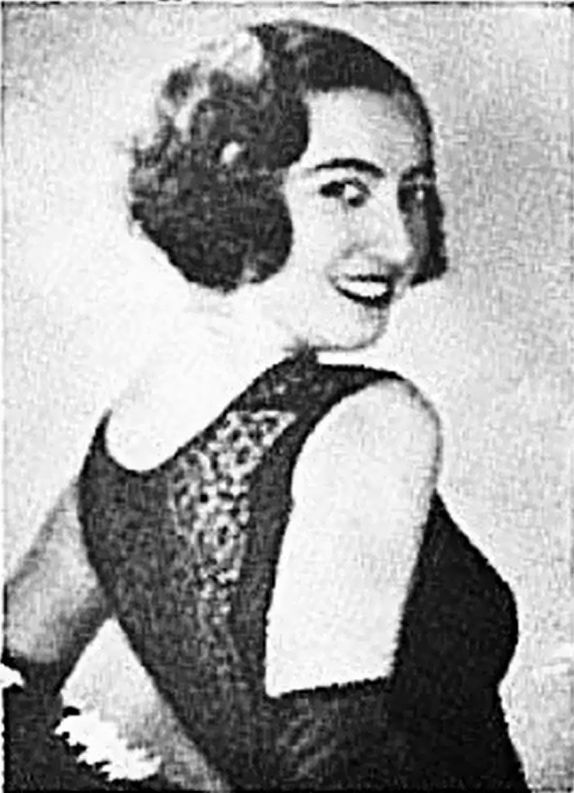
Fanny Gordon, Warsaw composer

Fanny Gordon, (Polish:Faina Markowna Kwiatkowska Russian: Фаина Марковна Квятковская (Faina Markovna Kvyatkovskaya) - (also known as Faiga Jofé, Fayge Yoffe or Fayge Yofe; 23 December 1914 in Yalta – 9 July 1991 in Leningrad) was a Polish-Soviet composer. She was the only female laykhte-muzik ("light" i.e. pop music) composer in Poland.

== Life and career ==
Gordon was born in 1914 in Yalta, Crimea, Russian Empire. After the Russian Revolution her family emigrated to Poland. Faiga wrote poetry and composed songs for Warsaw cabarets and music theatres.

One of Gordon's most famous songs, composed around 1931, was Przy samowarze ("By the Samovar"), performed by Zula Pogorzelska and Tadeusz Olsza at the Morskie Oko theatre in the revue "Podróż na księżyc" (Journey To The Moon) in April 1931. Andrzej Włast wrote the lyrics in 1931 and the song became an international hit, recorded by German and American dance bands. Later a record company asked her to write Russian words to the melody, and the result was «У самовара».

Her other hits included the tango "Skrwawione serce" ("My Bleeding Heart") sung by Polish "queen of tango" Stanisława Nowicka, the foxtrot "Abdul Bej" based on oriental motifs, sung by Tadeusz Faliszewski and Albert Harris, and "Siemieczki", called "The Polish Bublitshki". Her tango "Nietoperze" ("The Bats"), with lyrics about those who hunt for love at night written by Szer-Szeń (pen-name of the prominent Polish poet, Jan Brzechwa). Her "Bal u starego Joska" ("Party at the Old Josel's"), also known as "Bal na Gnojnej" ("Party At the Dung Lane"), lyrics by Andrzej Włast, was intended as a send-up of Warsaw "apasz" (underworld) ballads and became so famous it is now often cited as the first Warsaw underworld folksong. After the war the song was often performed by Stanisław Grzesiuk. In 1933, she wrote the operetta Jacht miłości (Yacht of Love) with a hit, the tango "Indie" (also performed in the Netherlands and the United States as "New York Baby").

Before World War II Gordon lived alternately in Warsaw and the United States. She was trapped in Warsaw at the outbreak of the war, but escaped to Vilnius, Lithuania, and eventually to Leningrad (Saint Petersburg), where she continued to compose under the names Fania Markovna Kviatkovskaya and Fania Kwiatkowski. She died in Leningrad in 1991.
