= Henry Vars =

Polish-American composer (1902–1977)

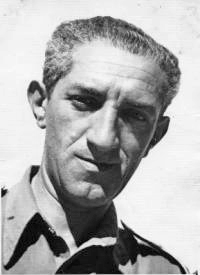
- Vars c. 1944
- Born: Henryk Warszawski; December 29, 1902; Warsaw, Congress Poland, Russian Empire
- Died: September 1, 1977 (aged 74); Los Angeles, California, U.S.
- Resting place: Hillside Memorial Park Cemetery, Culver City
- Other name: Henryk Wars
- Occupations: Composer; arranger; conductor; pianist; bandleader
- Years active: 1927–1974

Henry Vars (born Henryk Warszawski; December 29, 1902 – September 1, 1977) was a Polish-American composer, arranger and conductor whose compositions spanned popular, jazz and classical genres. He is regarded as the most important musical theatre, pop and film music composer of the interwar Poland.

Known in Poland as Henryk Wars, he is widely considered a pioneer of Polish jazz with his first composition "New York Times" (1927) being regarded as the very first jazz song in the history of Polish music. His other jazz and pop songs from the period include "Miłość ci wszystko wybaczy" (1933), "Umówiłem się z nią na dziewiątą", "Sex appeal" (both from 1937), "Ach, jak przyjemnie" and "Już nie zapomnisz mnie" (both from 1939).

In the United States, Henry Vars is best remembered for scoring westerns Seven Men From Now (1956) and Escort West (1959), with an adventure film Flipper (1963) being his most famous work. His other American works include a Margaret Whiting song "Over and Over and Over", Mel Tormé's "I Owe A Kiss To A Girl In Iowa" (both from 1950), Brenda Lee's "Speak to Me Pretty" (1961) and Doris Day's Walk With Him (1962). Wars also composed a symphony, now available on the Internet, as is his Piano Concerto of 1950.

== Biography ==
Henryk Wars was born on 29 December 1902 in Warsaw, in the Russian Partition of Poland, to Józef Izrael Warszawski, an engineer, and Sara Warszawska (née Lubelska), into an assimilated Polish-Jewish family. He was the second of four children, with three sisters: Józefina, Paulina, and Franciszka. Beginning in 1906, the family spent eight years in France due to his father's work. There, Wars learned French and received his first piano lessons from his mother before continuing his musical education with a private teacher. The family returned to Warsaw in 1914, settling at 14 Waliców Street. His older sister, Józefina, later became a mezzo-soprano at the Warsaw Opera and La Scala, while his younger sister Paulina pursued a career as a concert pianist and accompanist before being murdered at the Treblinka extermination camp during the Holocaust. His youngest sister, Franciszka, married an Italian diplomat and did not pursue a professional musical career.

Wars attended the newly opened Mazovian Voivodeship Gymnasium, at 16 Klonowa Street, where he quickly overcame the major educational gaps resulting from his years abroad and completed his secondary education, passing the matura examination in 1920. Described as a diligent student, he also displayed an exceptional aptitude for music and drawing, becoming known among his classmates for his ability to play pieces by ear and for sketching caricatures. He later recalled his seventh-grade history lessons as especially influential. During the Polish–Soviet War, inspired by radio posters and the mass mobilization of students to defend the newly independent Polish state, he volunteered for military service and fought in the Battle of Warsaw, for which he was awarded the Cross of Valour.

After the war, Wars initially pursued law at Warsaw University, while simultaneously studying painting at the Academy of Fine Arts. During his studies at the Academy of Fine Arts, a youth concert was organized, which he conducted. Professor Emil łynarski, who had just arrived from Bolshevik Russia, came to the concert. He noticed Henryk, handed him his business card, and asked him to come to his hotel where he was staying the next morning. In shock, he waited until tomorrow. In the morning he ran to the professor, played some composition on the piano. The professor recognized that he had talent and gave him a scholarship to the conservatory.

However, not discounting the above scenario, According to records, On September 3, 1919, a request from Henryk Wars addressed to the Director of the Conservatory of Music in Warsaw was received, asking to have the honor of being admitted to the ranks of harmony class students, enclosing the documents: birth certificate, smallpox vaccination, and school certificates. A week later under this request, a note appeared: passed the task for a 4 (good).

Wars studied composition under Professor Roman Statkowski and Emil Młynarski, Under Emil Młynarski, Wars perfected his piano skills in his piano class. In 1922, Emil Młynarski resigned from pedagogical work and dedicated himself exclusively to the Warsaw Opera. He handed over his students and authority over the Conservatory to Henryk Melcer. He soon became famous for very modern pedagogical methods. He introduced experimental teaching programs, changed examination rules, and set incredibly high demands for teachers and students. Despite this, Henryk Wars recalled him very warmly later on, emphasizing how much immense knowledge he acquired from Melcer.

An account from his conservatory years on his discovery of jazz was this: "I had been recommended to the owner of Syrena Record, a gramophone company with a music shop on Marszałkowska Street, to design a poster for him. While working in the shop, I found myself completely captivated by the music playing in the background. They were American records featuring orchestra leaders like Fletcher Henderson and Louis Armstrong—masters of a sound I had never encountered before. It was called jazz. Noticing my intense reaction to the music, the shop owner unexpectedly asked the cashier, Mrs. Lucia, to gift me ten records, though to this day I have no idea why. I took them home, and the very next day, I brought them along with a portable gramophone into Professor Statkowski’s class at the conservatory. I asked him to listen to this fresh, unfamiliar style of music. To my absolute horror, the professor kicked me out of the classroom, gramophone and all, and told me never to show my face there again."

After graduating in 1925, Wars returned to military service, and he served as a trainee in the first course at the Reserve Artillery Officer Cadet School in Włodzimierz Wołyński, Echoes of these experiences would soon resonate throughout his creative work in the form of marches, patriotic songs, and wartime ballads. However, the pieces that stuck with him most vividly were the short, popular songs known as żurawiejki, which were sung across nearly every military unit but were completely new to him at the time.

Having shed his uniform, he could finally dedicate himself fully to good music. His father had come to terms with the fact that Henryk would not be joining the ranks of Warsaw lawyers, assuming instead that he would see him at the conductor’s podium in a philharmonic or an opera house, but Henryk had fallen in love with syncopated music. It was at the Qui Pro Quo cabaret that he met Andrzej Włast, who was already a well-known lyricist, director, and impresario—a frequent guest of Parisian cabarets and a passionate lover of American jazz.

In 1927, he composed the song "New York Times" ("I do nothing all day but read the New York Times"), which was performed at the Karuzela (Merry-Go-Round) Theatre by Tadeusz Olsza and recorded by Henryk Gold's Orchestra for Syrena Rekord. He submitted the piano score to the Gebethner and Wolff publishing house, but had to cover the printing costs out of his own pocket. This was despite the fact that Włast—who wrote the lyrics for the song New York Times—had been publishing his own songs with them for many years. In the Warsaw Carousel revue titled Może tak (Perhaps So), the song was performed as a duet by Tadeusz Olsza and Eugeniusz Koszutski. To give fate a helpful nudge, the day after the premiere, the Warszawski family visited every sheet music and record shop across Warsaw. They explicitly asked for the recordings and sheet music of the song New York Times by the young, talented Henryk Wars. Whenever they received a negative reply, they expressed absolute outrage that such a hit wasn't available for purchase yet.

Although the song was a commercial and popular failure, it succeeded in bringing Wars's name to Andrzej Włast. Wars later recounted going all across Warsaw's musical stores with his entire family, to find records or sheet music (drawn by Wars), of the song. Later attempts to success included his "Polonia" waltz, an attempt by Andrzej Wlast to mimic the "can-can" of the Moulin Rouge in Paris for the Morskie Oko Theatre, but also failed.

Wars's first major success came in 1928 with "Zatańczmy tango" ("Let's Dance a Tango"), written for Stanisława Nowicka and Eugeniusz Bodo. The song quickly became an hit all across Poland, The recorded version by Taduesz Faliszewski proved so phenomenally popular that Syrena Record struggled to keep pace with producing the physical discs and covers, as well as major sheet music runs. Despite his sudden success with tango, Henryk Wars refused to give up on jazz. He stubbornly searched for the right venue, form, and method to popularize this style of music. Following the triumph of the revue To trzeba zobaczyć and his promotion to musical director of the stage, Wars faced no resistance when proposing several jazz numbers for each new production.

Around this time, he was hired as chief conductor and pianist at the Morskie Oko Theatre, after much thought by Wlast and also joined Henryk Gold's Orchestra.

From 1929, Henryk Wars played with Leon Boruński in revues as a regular duo called "Jazz for Two Pianos." During this time, he organized a reveller-style choir, the Jazz Singers, for the Morskie Oko Film Festival and recorded two albums with them on Syrena Record. This ensemble was the precursor to the later professional vocal group, the Wars Choir, which operated from 1930 until the end of 1933. Under Wars's direction and with his regular accompaniment, the Choir performed in revue theaters and recorded exclusive albums for Syrena Record. After the Choir ceased operations, Wars led a similar vocal ensemble called the Weseli Chłopcy z Columbii (Merry Boys from Columbia), which performed at venues such as the Hollywood Cinema in Warsaw and recorded albums for Columbia Records.

During the 1930s, Wars composed songs for a series of musical comedies in Poland, and his significance in the country is comparable to that of Irving Berlin in America. Between 1930 and 1939, he scored approximately 50–53 films, including Pieśniarz Warszawy, Manewry Miłosne, Romeo i Julcia, Antek Policmajster, and Włóczęgi. His melodies from this period, along with those of Jerzy Petersburski and Zygmunt Wiehler, remain extemely popular in Poland, with many songs closely associated with pre-war Lwów. Recent recordings include Ach, śpij kochanie (Ah, Sleep My Darling) by Grzegorz Turnau and others, as well as numerous performances of Tylko we Lwowie. The aforementioned songs are still sung widely and have becomes household names. In 1993, Wars's song "Milosc ci wszystko wybaczy" appeared in Schindler's List. In 2002, his song Umówiłem się z nią na dziewiątą (I Have a Date with Her at Nine) appeared in Roman Polański's film The Pianist.

Wars composed his first film score for Na Sybir in 1930, after gaining fame as a conductor and performer at various Warsaw cabarets and theaters, including Morskie Oko, Hollywood, and Wielka Rewia. On June 18, 1930, a revue entitled Dancing Every Day was staged at the Morskie Oko Theatre, for which Wars created the main theme and arranged all the songs. A major milestone in his career was the establishment of cooperation with the Sfinks-Libkow Film studio, for which he composed the music for one of the first Polish sound films, "Na Sybir", in 1930. The film's sound was coordinated under his direction at the UFA studio in Berlin, and the premiere took place on October 31, 1930, at the Royal Castle in Warsaw, in the presence of President Ignacy Mościcki. At Wars's request, the president supported the purchase of film sound equipment for Poland, which was later installed in the Syrena Record studio. Wars said that "Na Sybir" was a turning point for his entire career, turning him into an very well sought composer. Wars recalls, when walking through Warsaw, he noticed a motorcade of three Cadillacs—the presidential car flanked by two security vehicles. At one point, the entire column pulled over by the sidewalk because President Mościcki wanted to stop and greet him personally. A few days later, Wars received an invitation to a private audience, during which he was gifted two antique vases. They stood proudly in his Warsaw apartment all the way until the outbreak of the war.

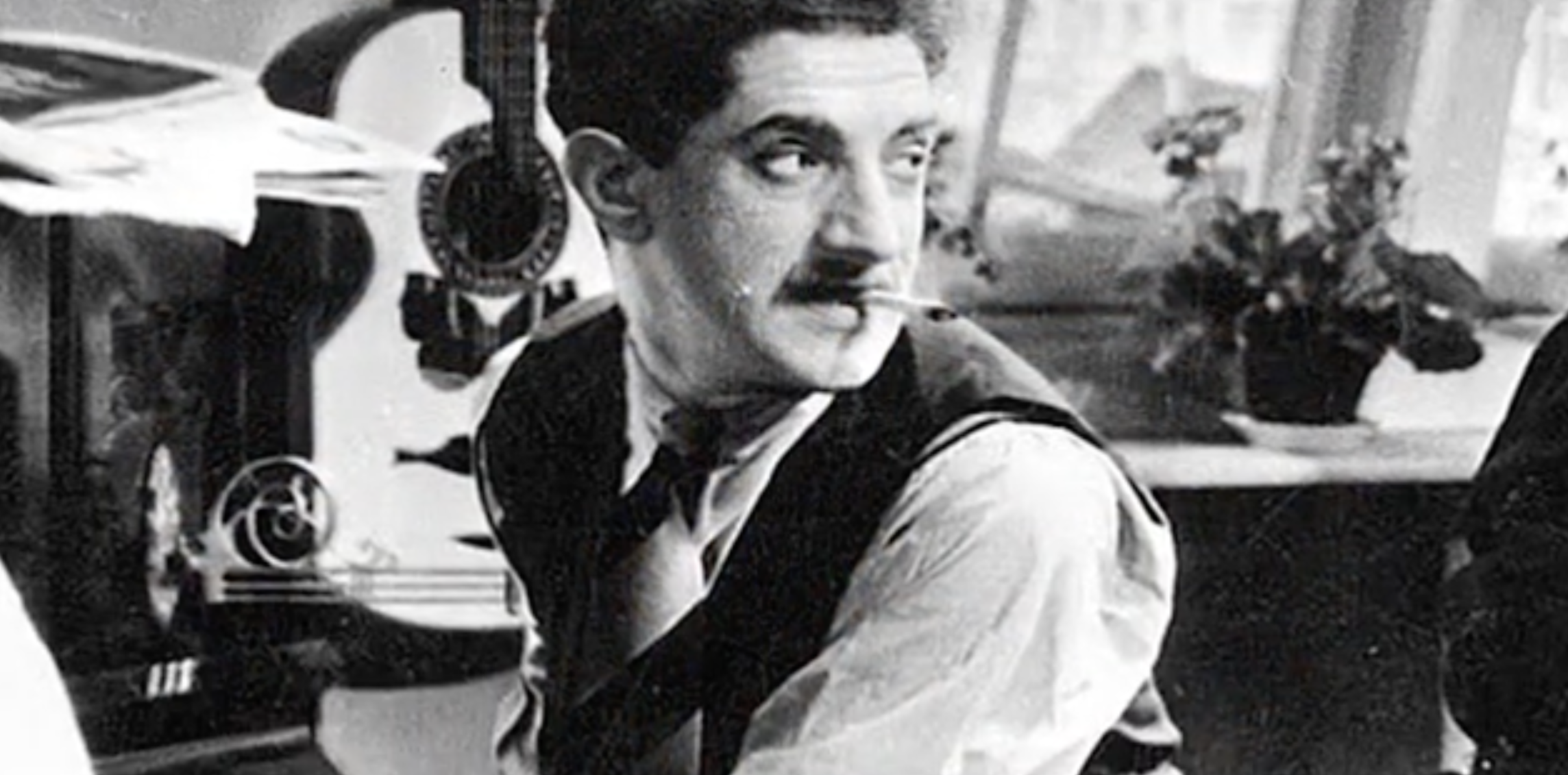
Henryk Wars playing the piano in the film Pietro Wyzej (1937)

He also composed scores for the films Paweł i Gaweł, Szpieg w masce (A Masked Spy), Piętro wyżej (Neighbors), and Zapomniana melodia (A Forgotten Melody). Wars was a pioneer of swing music in Poland, as his orchestrations were the first to use the word "Swing" in the country. The peak of his film composition career came in 1937, when he composed music and songs for thirteen films. Over time, film music became so important to Wars that he resigned from his position as musical director at Syrena Record, although he would lead the Syrena-Record orchestra along with Iwo Wesby, the new musical director. .

In pre-war Poland, swing never achieved wide popularity, largely because of the conservative musical tastes of Polish audiences and the cautious artistic policies of the country's major record labels. At Syrena-Electro, artistic decisions were dominated by Wars, who, despite having embraced jazz in his youth, and was a pioneer of swing, prioritized commercially reliable genres such as the tango, waltz, and moderate foxtrots. The belief of the shareholders of major recording companies was that music like tangos and waltzes would be more suitable for the Polish middle classes, something that the other big 2 bandleaders in Poland, Henryk Gold, the leader of the Columbia Records Orchestra, and Jerzy Gert, the director of the "Odeon" orchestra, had to follow. Franciszek Związek, a Polish bandleader, recalled that Syrena-Electro was not that interested in recording the more jazzy foxtrot pieces, as the Great Depression meant the focus was on the most profitable endeavors. Eddie Rosner, the famous trumpet player and later the leader of the State Jazz Orchestra of the USSR had only recorded 3-4 slides for Syrena-Rekord, despite his popularity.

Wars also conducted for the Odeon recording company at 13 Plocka Ulica, Warsaw, from 1929 to 1931, and for Homocord, Parlophon, and Columbia Records, all represented by the pressing factory at the same address. He occasionally wrote lyrics for film songs under the pseudonym "Fraska." Wars had a very good singing voice and frequently joined singers in his recordings. He was hired as a conductor by the Hollywood, Cyganeria, and Cyrulik Warszawski theaters.

In 1934, Wars worked as a musician in Great Britain for an extended period. His songs, such as Zrób to Tak and O, Alaska!, became hits in Italy and England. Zrób to Tak being an instrumental hit known as "Pretty Face," and O, Alaska! recorded by Alberto Semprini's Orchestra, the premier orchestra in Italy. After returning to Poland, he was commissioned by Polish Radio to record Stille's jazz piano recital on tape, which was broadcast on Berlin Radio on January 3, 1935. In the fall of 1935, he conducted performances of J. Berstl's operetta Szczęsty pech (Lucky Bad Luck) at the Summer Theater. His considerable conducting abilities, not only in light music, are further evidenced by the fact that in 1938–39, he conducted symphonic concerts organized under the auspices of the Symphonic Music Association.

Until the outbreak of World War II, Henryk Wars lived and composed at 23 Aleje Jerozolimskie Street, moving there in 1934. Rehearsals for artists performing his works were held there; the living room housed two Steinway grand pianos – a white one and a black one. He actively participated in the work of the Association of Stage Authors and Composers of Poland and frequently served on its board (he served as its secretary from 1936).

Shortly before the outbreak of World War II, Henryk Wars was drafted into the Polish Army and served in the defense of Poland in 1939. He was taken prisoner of war by the German army but managed to escape from a transport train at a rest stop. In 1940, he organized the big band Tea-Jazz in Soviet-occupied Lwów. Tea-Jazz was a term coined by Leonid Utesov, from Odessa, to refer to his theatricalized jazz performances.

Wars's family faced grave danger during this period. His wife, Carola, and their children, including Robert (born 1934) and Danuta, were forced into the Warsaw Ghetto. Through Wars's connections in the USSR, he obtained Soviet passports that enabled his family to escape. Robert later recounted that a Nazi guard inspected the passports but let them pass to the Aryan side of Warsaw, joking, "See you soon in Moscow." From 1940, Wars was the target of attacks by far-right Polish political groups under control of the Nazi government due to his Jewish background, which led to the banning of his records in Nazi-occupied Poland.

During this period, Wars also composed music for many Soviet films, including Мечта, reportedly Franklin Roosevelt's favorite film, Морской ястреб, and Швейк готовится к бою. He composed his first symphony at this time.

Although the Tea-Jazz orchestra began in Lwów, it soon toured extensively across the Soviet Union, from Odessa to Moscow and beyond. Hnatiuk notes that the first tour to Odessa occurred in 1940, just as mass deportations of Poles began in Lwów. It is difficult to determine whether the timing was entirely coincidental or whether some friendly Soviet colleagues tipped them off. Singers from the Theater of the Opera, actors from all three dramatic theaters, and performers from the satirical Teatr Miniatiur appear on the list of 644 refugees whom the local Soviet theater administration reclaimed from the NKVD, thus saving them from deportation. In contrast, the names of the jazz orchestra members of Wars, do not appear on this list. Henryk Wars became a friend of the Soviet composer Aram Khachaturian.

Tea-Jazz records became very popular in the USSR. Priced at seven roubles, they included Russian versions of pre-war Polish songs such as Zapomnienie (Oblivion) and Nic o Tobie Nie Wiem (I Hardly Know Anything about You). Many of the songs from pre-war repertoires were translated by Feliks Konarski, who had been born in Kyiv. Wars's 1939 hit from the film Włóczęgi, Tylko we Lwowie, was translated into Russian as Ждем вас во Львове! (Lviv Awaits You) and was performed as the finale of every show. This number was released on a record under the Soviet Gramplastrest recording company, featuring an intricately designed label. Tea-Jazz also recorded Yiddish songs; Wars, along with the pre-war singer Albert Harris, recorded Bei Mir Bist Du Schön in Yiddish. Many other Tea-Jazz recordings may have existed, but most are lost, as swing records were largely abandoned after 1945.

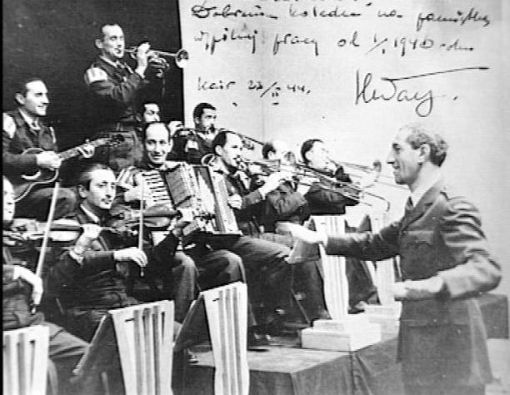
The Polish Parade Orchestra, led by Henryk Wars, Cairo 1942

In late 1941, Wars and his musicians joined the Polish II Corps of General Anders as part of the Polska Parada cabaret, performing across Persia, Iraq, Egypt, and Palestine. Henry Vars performed in front of Reza Pahlavi and King Farouk of Egypt. The family traveled across the Caspian Sea on a rusty Soviet freighter to Persia, and his young son Robert sometimes played drums on stage with the orchestra. Wars's ensemble was highly acclaimed among Allied forces and won first prize in an artistic competition among Allied military ensembles. In Italy, they were involved in performances connected to the Red Poppies on Monte Cassino in 1944.

After the war, Wars briefly remained in Italy, composing music for Polish and Italian films, including Wielka Droga (Great Way, 1946), and recording for the Italian company La Voce del Padrone. He served in the army as a second lieutenant and was awarded the Silver Cross of Merit and the Military Medal. He also received the Order of Cavaliere de Croce d'Italia personally from the last Italian king, Victor Emmanuel, making him a member of the Italian nobility. He also received an award from President Truman, later on. He toured and performed concerts across Italy, France, and England, but the rise of communism in Poland and new opportunities abroad prompted him to emigrate to the United States in 1947.

Upon arrival in New York, Wars, who changed his name to Henry Vars, faced financial and professional struggles. He even considered abandoning music to become a clerk, as he was not receiving any opportunities. He was forced to do odd jobs, including working as a janitor, taxi driver, and running errands, while relying on the income of his wife, Elizabeth, a fashion designer. Vars's first wife, Carola, separated from him. In 1950, he was reunited with his son Robert, who had been in Tel-Aviv and urgently required surgery, which he received from a top UCLA medical specialist.

Robert recalls, "My father wasn’t a Hollywood type, to go for drinks with producers, parties, have martinis. He was a grey-haired, cultural European." His wife Elizabeth worked for income as a fashion designer, while he sought film opportunities. At the time most of the film production was being done in Europe rather than Hollywood because costs were so much lower there. In 1950, with sponsorship from Ira Gershwin, and Artur Rubenstein, Vars joined ASCAP, marking the start of his official American career. He got his first break via the Columbia Records Company. The family settled in Los Angeles, and Vars began writing film scores professionally. He became a close friend of John Wayne, and his songs were performed by well-known artists such as Margaret Whiting, Bing Crosby, Doris Day, Brenda Lee, and Dinah Shore.

Vars composed the score and title song for the Flipper Movie (1963) and Television (1964) series, as well as for Daktari. His work spanned multiple genres, including Westerns, crime films, mysteries, horror, children's films, and television. Early U.S. credits include Chained for Life (1951), followed by Seven Men From Now (1956), Man in the Vault, Escort West, Freckles, and the 1956 Western Gun the Man Down. He also contributed uncredited cues to other productions. Vars's son Robert became a successful lawyer, and Vars was highly respected in his family and professional circles.

In 1967, Vars visited Europe and returned to Warsaw, where he performed concerts in the Palace of Culture and Science with the famous Polish singer Anna German. His visit was widely covered in the news, including a newsreel in Polska Kronika Filmowa. He also visited his sister in France and traveled to London. At one point, he considered relocating to Warsaw, following his colleague and 1930s composer friend Jerzy Petersburski, but ultimately remained in Los Angeles. Vars's final credited film work was Fool's Parade (1971), starring James Stewart. In his later years, he enjoyed visual art, sketching, and attending cultural events, including Polish church events at the Cathedral of Jasna Gora in Los Angeles. He maintained a vibrant personality and strong family relationships. Wars was an accomplished caricaturist; among his collection are caricatures of H. S. Truman, Lyndon Johnson, Mao Tse Tung, Jackie Kennedy, Charles de Gaulle, Pandit Nehru, Abdel Gamel Nasser, and many others.

Regarding his composition style, Vars noted that the actor Eugeniusz Bodo could sit at the piano and quickly inspire him with tunes. Vars was also known for spending long hours improvising at the piano.

== Death ==
Vars died on September 1, 1977, in his home in Beverly Hills, reportedly listening to music by his beloved teacher Karol Szymanowski. You, your talents, and your music will live forever in the lives you touched, was the inscription on his gravestone. Vars had two children: one an attorney, the aforementioned Robert Vars, the other, Danuta, an housewife, and four grandchildren. One grandchild was a medical student at Stanford University. After the war, he composed symphonic works, including a one-movement piano concerto, a symphony, and Urban Sketches, which were rediscovered in the 1990s. In 2017, Polish Radio and the National Centre for Culture released an album collecting these works, performed by the Polish Radio Orchestra and pianist Piotr Orzechowski.

In the early 1930s, Vars met Maurice Ravel and George Gershwin in Paris. His orchestral triptych, City Sketches (High-Rise; Downtown Blues; Freeway Scherzo), is stylistically reminiscent of Gershwin's An American in Paris and incorporates jazzy elements similar to those in Ravel's later works.

== Discography ==
A ja cię kochać nie przestanę (words by Andrzej Włast, 1933)

A jednak czegoś mi brak (words by Jerzy Jurandot, 1936)

A mnie w to graj (words by Jerzy Jurandot, movie Bolek i Lolek, sung by Adolf Dymsza)

A u mnie siup, a u mnie cyk (words by Emanuel Schlechter, 1936, sung by Adolf Dymsza)

A. B. C. miłości / Abecadło miłości / ABC miłości (words by Marian Hemar, 1935)

Ach, jak oni się kochają / Dama kier i walet pik (words by Andrzej Włast, 1932)

Ach, jak przyjemnie (words by Ludwik Starski, movie Zapomniana melodia, 1938, sung by Adam Aston, later by Irena Santor)

Ach, jedź na Wschód / Jedź na Wschód (words by Andrzej Włast, 1935)

Adios! / Żegnaj (words by Andrzej Włast, pasodoble, 1933)

Alaska / Oh! Alaska (words by Bolesław Rajfeld, foxtrot, 1934)

Angelita (words by Andrzej Włast, tango andaluzyjskie, 1929)

Betty Boop (words by Andrzej Włast, foxtrot, 1933)

Będzie lepiej / Jutro będzie lepiej (words by Emanuel Schlechter, movie Będzie lepiej, 1936)

Biała Lady / Srebrny ptak (words by Andrzej Włast, boston hawajski, 1930)

Biedny Żyd / Zimny drań (words by Edward Rozenberg, parodia, 1934)

Carmencita (words by Andrzej Włast, tango, 1930)

Co bez miłości wart jest świat? / Cóż bez miłości wart jest świat / Mahomet bez brody (words by Konrad Tom, Emanuel Schlechter, foxtrot, 1935)

Co ja zrobię, że mi się podobasz? (words by Jerzy Jurandot, movie Papa się żeni, 1936, sung by Zbigniew Rakowiecki and Lidia Wysocka)

Co, jak, gdzie / Co, jak i gdzie (words by Jerzy Walden, 1936)

Codziennie dancing (words by Andrzej Włast, slowfox, 1930)

Conchita (Wars – Jerry) (words by Jerzy Ryba, rumba, 1932)

Czarny Jim / Czarny Jim bawełnę zbiera (words by Andrzej Włast, foxtrot, 1939)

Czekałem tyle dni (words by Jerzy Ryba, slow tango-fox, 1938)

Czekam / Piosenka dla lotnika (words by Feliks Konarski, tango slowfox, 1932)

Czemu cię nie mogę zapomnieć? / Czemu (words by Henryk Wars, foxtrot, 1932)

Czy pani tańczy rumbę? (words by Andrzej Włast, rumba, 1931)

Czy przyjdziesz znów (words by Andrzej Włast, blues, 1930)

Czy to warto być upartą? / Czy warto być upartą / Czy to warto? (words by Konrad Tom, slowfox, 1935)

Czy tutaj mieszka panna Agnieszka (words by Emanuel Schlechter, tango, 1937)

Dajcie mi żyć (words by Ludwik Starski, foxtrot, 1933)

Dla ciebie chcę być biała / Dla ciebie chcę być białą / Ja chcę być biała (words by Konrad Tom, Emanuel Schlechter, jig foxtrot, 1934)

Dlaczego nie chcesz spać / Ach, śpij kochanie / Kołysanka (words by Ludwik Starski, slowfox, movie Paweł i Gaweł from 1938, sung by Eugeniusz Bodo and Adolf Dymsza)

Dobranoc, oczka zmruż / Kołysanka Tońka (words by Emanuel Schlechter, movie Włóczęgi from 1939, sung by Szczepko and Tońko)

Don Pedro / Don Pedro tango gra (words by Andrzej Włast, tango komiczne, 1933)

Droga do Warszawy (words by Feliks Konarski, marsz, 1942)

Dwa pocałunki (words by Jerzy Walden, slowfox, 1936)

Dziewica z kolonii Staszica / Moja dziewica z kolonji Staszica (words by Julian Tuwim, foxtrot, 1927)

Dzisiaj ta, jutro tamta / Dzisiaj ta i jutro ta / Pierwsze szczęście (words by Emanuel Schlechter, foxtrot, 1937)

Dziś będziesz moją (words by Aleksander Jellin, tango, 1933)

Ewelina (words by Jerzy Jurandot, movie Papa się żeni, 1936, sung by Mira Zimińska)

Florek, gdzie twój humorek? / Co z tobą Florek, gdzie twój humorek? (words by Jerzy Jurandot, foxtrot, 1937)

Frontem do morza! (words by Andrzej Włast, marsz, 1933)

Gdy szczęście podaje ci dłoń / Gdy miłość podaje ci dłoń (words by Emanuel Schlechter, slowfox, 1934)

Gdyby szczęście przyszło dziś (words by Marian Hemar, walc, 1935)

Gdzie najlepiej (words by Aleksander Świtaj, tango, 1946)

Habanita (words by Jerzy Jurandot, rumba, 1937)

Hio, hio! (words by Andrzej Włast, slowfox, 1939)

Hip – hip – hurra! / Na cześć młodości / Hip, hip, hura! (words by Ludwik Starski, fox marsz, 1939)

Ho! Ho! (words by Konrad Tom, foxtrot, 1933)

Hokus-pokus (words by Jerzy Jurandot, slowfox, 1936)

Hop, siup (words by Emanuel Schlechter, 1937)

Idź, nie wracaj / Idź... Nie wracaj! (words by Andrzej Włast, tango dramatyczne, 1932)

inc: Ten krawat w grochy / Złociste włoski (words by Konrad Tom, slowfox, 1933)

incipit: I zbuduję ci domeczek (words unknown, kujawiak, 1937)

Ja mam dryg, ja mam szyk (?) / Jak być żoną, jak być matroną... (words by Konrad Tom, foxtrot, 1934)

Jak kochać, to namiętnie / Jeśli kochać, to namiętnie (words by Jan Brzechwa, tango, 1931)

Jak pani się ten pan podoba (words by Andrzej Włast, foxtrot, sung by Krystyna Paczewska)

Jak trudno jest zapomnieć (words by Jerzy Jurandot, tango slowfox, 1935)

Jak za dawnych lat / Powróćmy jak za dawnych lat (words by Jerzy Jurandot, tango, sung by Stefan Witas, 1935)

Jedna, jedyna / Jest jedna, jedyna / Jest tylko jedna (words by Emanuel Schlechter, tango, 1937)

Jest jedna droga (words by Feliks Konarski, slowfox, 1946)

Już nie mogę dłużej kryć (words by Jerzy Jurandot, movie Pani minister tańczy from 1937, sung by Tola Mankiewiczówna and Aleksander Żabczyński)

Już nie zapomnisz mnie / Zapomniana melodia (words by Ludwik Starski, movie Zapomniana melodia from 1938, sung by Aleksander Żabczyński)

Już taki jestem zimny drań (words by Jerzy Nel and Ludwik Starski, movie Pieśniarz Warszawy from 1934, sung by Eugeniusz Bodo)

Kocha, lubi, szanuje (words by Konrad Tom and Emanuel Schlechter, movie Kocha, lubi, szanuje, sung by Mieczysław Fogg, later by Irena Santor)

Kochaj mnie, a będę twoją (words by Andrzej Włast and Emanuel Schlechter, tango, 1930)

Kocham (words by J. Roland, movie Bezimienni bohaterowie, 1931)

Kołysanka (?) / Śpij ma dziecino, oczki zmruż (words by Jerzy Walden, movie unknown, 1936)

Kryzys (words by Emanuel Schlechter, Konrad Tom, foxtrot, 1933)

Kto usta twe całował (words by Julian Tuwim, walc-boston, 1934)

Kwiat jabłoni / Jabłoni kwiat (words by Konrad Tom, blues japoński, 1931)

Lim-pam-pom / Lambeth Walk z filmu "Kłamstwo Krystyny" / Lim pam pom / Limpampom (words by Jerzy Jurandot, foxtrot, 1939)

Maleńka Jenny (words by J. Roland, movie Głos pustyni, 1932, sung by Mieczysław Fogg)

Mała ale zuchwała (words by Emanuel Schlechter, slowfox, 1934)

Małpy / Na baobabie (words by Andrzej Włast, black-bottom, 1927)

Marionetki / Marjonetki (words by Andrzej Włast, foxtrot, 1933)

Marzenie / Gdy wszystko stracę, ty zostaniesz mi (words by Andrzej Włast, tango, 1929)

May Wong (words by Andrzej Włast, blues, 1929)

Miłość ci wszystko wybaczy / Miłość ci wszystko przebaczy (words by Julian Tuwim, movie Szpieg w masce, 1933, sung by Hanka Ordonówna)

Miłość to cały świat (words by Emanuel Schlechter, slowfox, 1935)

Miss Mary (words by Aleksander Jellin, foxtrot, 1932)

Modna piosenka (Wars – Schlechter) (words by Emanuel Schlechter, tango, 1939)

Moja królewna / Bajka / Za siódmą górą / Może ty będziesz mą królewną / Może ty jesteś mą królewną (words by Ludwik Starski, tango, 1938)

Może dzień, może rok (words by Feliks Konarski, foxtrot, 1938)

Mój czarny chłopiec (words by Andrzej Włast, slowfox, 1931)

Mój świat się zaczął dziś / Przychodzi nie wiesz skąd (words by Emanuel Schlechter, tango, 1935)

Mój torerro / Mój torero (words by Andrzej Włast, bolero, 1932)

Mów coś! (words by Andrzej Włast, foxtrot, 1931)

Mów, że myślisz o mnie (words by Emanuel Schlechter, walc, 1935)

My dwa, oba cwaj (words by Emanuel Schlechter, foxtrot, movie Będzie lepiej, 1936, sung by Szczepko and Tońko)

My huzarzy wolne ptaki (words by Jerzy Jurandot, marsz, 1935)

Na cześć młodości / Hip, hip, hura! (words by Ludwik Starski, movie Sportowiec mimo woli, 1939)

Na pierwszy znak / Gdy dasz mi znak (words by Julian Tuwim, movie Szpieg w masce, 1933, sung by Hanka Ordonówna)

New York Times (from 1928, sung by Tadeusz Olsza and Eugeniusz Koszutski)

Nic o Tobie nie wiem (words by Konrad Tom and Emanuel Schlechter, movie Włóczęgi, 1939, sung by Andrzej Bogucki and Zbyszko Runowiecki)

Nic takiego (words by Marian Hemar, movie ABC miłości, 1935, sung by Kazimierz Krukowski and Adolf Dymsza)

O, Key (words by Konrad Tom and Emanuel Schlechter, movie Czy Lucyna to dziewczyna, 1934, sung by Eugeniusz Bodo and Jadwiga Smosarska)

On nie powróci już (words by Andrzej Włast, sung by Chór Dana)

Panie Janie w stylu jazz (words by Ludwik Starski, movie Zapomniana melodia, 1938)

Piosenka o zagubionym sercu (words by A. M. Świniarski, movie Pan minister i dessous, sung by Hanka Ordonówna)

Płomienne serca (words by Marian Hemar, movie Na Sybir, 1930, sung by Tadeusz Faliszewski)

Reformy pani minister (words by Jerzy Jurandot, movie Pani minister tańczy, 1937, sung by Tola Mankiewiczówna)

Serce Batiara (words by Emanuel Schlechter, movie Serce Batiara for 1939 release, all copies lost)

Sexapil (words by Emanuel Schlechter, movie Piętro wyżej, 1937, sung by Eugeniusz Bodo)

Szczęście raz się uśmiecha (words by Julian Tuwim, movie Pan minister i dessous, sung by Hanka Ordonówna)

Tak cudnie mi (words by Jerzy Jurandot, movie Pani minister tańczy, 1937, sung by Tola Mankiewiczówna and Aleksander Żabczyński)

Tyle miłości (words by Konrad Tom, movie Jego ekscelencja subiekt, 1933, sung by Eugeniusz Bodo)

Tylko Ty (words by Aleksander Jellyn, 1930s–1933)

Tylko we Lwowie (words by Emanuel Schlechter, movie Włóczęgi, 1939, sung by Szczepko and Tońko)

Tylko z Tobą i dla Ciebie (words by Ludwik Starski and Jerzy Nel, movie Pieśniarz Warszawy, 1934, sung by Eugeniusz Bodo)

Umówiłem się z nią na dziewiątą (words by Emanuel Schlechter, movie Piętro wyżej, 1937, sung by Eugeniusz Bodo)

W hawajską noc (words by Konrad Tom and Emanuel Schlechter, movie Czarna perła, sung by Eugeniusz Bodo, later by Irena Santor)

Zakochany złodziej (words by Emanuel Schlechter and Ludwik Starski, 1937)

Zapomnisz o mnie (words by Andrzej Włast, sung by Tadeusz Faliszewski)

Zatańczmy tango (words by Andrzej Włast)

Złociste włoski (words by Konrad Tom, movie Jego ekscelencja subiekt, 1933, sung by Eugeniusz Bodo)

Zrób to tak (words by Ludwik Starski and Jerzy Nel, movie Pieśniarz Warszawy, sung by Eugeniusz Bodo)

Żołnierz polski (words by Julian Tuwim, patriotic song, 1930s)

Zostań, zostań tu (words by Emanuel Schlechter, foxtrot, 1936)

Za każdym razem (words by Jerzy Jurandot, 1937)

Za mną płynie świat / Ten świat płynie za mną (words by Ludwik Starski, 1936)

Zimny drań / Już taki jestem zimny drań (words by Jerzy Nel and Ludwik Starski, movie Pieśniarz Warszawy, sung by Eugeniusz Bodo)

== Concert Music ==
- Symphony No. 1 (1949)
- Concerto for Piano and Orchestra (1950)
- City Sketches (1951)
- Maalot. Elegy for Orchestra in Memory of Murdered Children (1974)

== Selected filmography ==
- Na Sybir (1930)
- Jego ekscelencja subiekt (1933)
- Life Sentence (1933)
- Pieśniarz Warszawy (1934)
- Is Lucyna a Girl? (1934)
- Count Michorowski (1937)
- Three Troublemakers (1937)
- Miss Minister Is Dancing (1937)
- Neighbors (1937)
- Krystyna's Lie (1939)
- Zapomniana melodia (1939)
- A Sportsman Against His Will (1940)
- Chained for Life (1951)
- The Big Heat (1953)
- Seven Men From Now (1956)
- Gun the Man Down (1956)
- The Unearthly (1957)
- China Doll (1958)
- The Little Shepherd of Kingdom Come (1961)
- Battle at Bloody Beach (1961)
- House of the Damned (1963)
- Flipper (1963)
- Flipper's New Adventure (1964)
- Fools' Parade (1971)
