= Michał Tyszkiewicz =

Michał Tyszkiewicz or Mykolas Tiškevičius is the name of several members of the Polish–Lithuanian noble Tyszkiewicz family:

- Michał Tyszkiewicz (16th century), envoy to the Crimean Khanate
- Michał Tyszkiewicz (1761–1839), polkovnik, purchased manors in Palanga and Biržai
- Michał Tyszkiewicz (1828–1897), collector of antiques and amateur Egyptologist
- Michał Stanisławowicz Tyszkiewicz (1857–1930), Ukrainian cultural activist, diplomat for the Ukrainian People's Republic
- Michał Zygmunt Tyszkiewicz (1903–1974), diplomat and songwriter
