= Andrzej Włast =

Polish Jewish songwriter

Andrzej Wlast
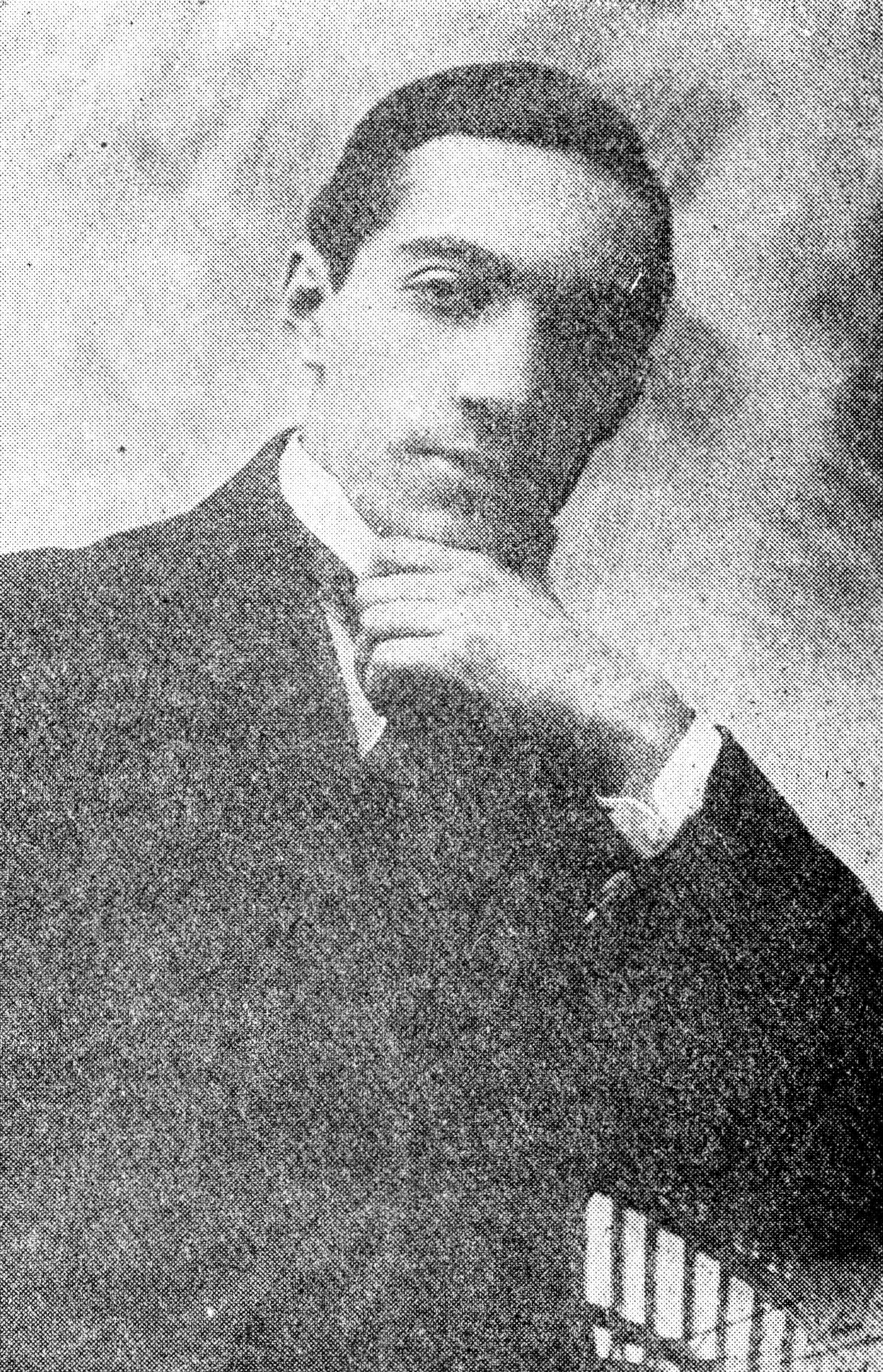
- Andrzej Włast, Polish cabaret lyricist and writer
- Born: Gustaw Baumritter; March 17, 1895; Łódź, Congress Poland, Russian Empire
- Died: 1942 (aged 46–47); Warsaw Ghetto, General Government
- Education: University of Warsaw
- Occupations: Lyricist, poet, cabaret writer, theatre director
- Years active: 1914–1942
- Known for: Lyrics for Polish interwar cabaret and popular music

Andrzej Włast (born Gustaw Baumritter; 17 March 1895 – December 1, 1942?) was a Polish lyricist, satirist, theatre director, and publicist. He was one of the most popular songwriters of the interwar period, a leading figure in Warsaw cabarets, and the founder of the revue theatre Morskie Oko. Włast wrote thousands of songs, including Tango Milonga, Jesienne róże, Rebeka, and Szkoda twoich łez, which were the greatest blockbusters of the Second Polish Republic. and is credited with coining the term przebój as a Polish equivalent of the German Schlager.

== Biography ==
Włast was born in Łódź to Szymon Baumritter and Salomea née Eisenmann. His father was a banker for a branch of the Imperial Russian Bank of Lodz (Bank Handlowy). He was educated at a private secondary school run by A. Jeżewski, in Łódź. On his mother's side, Włast's relatives included Icek Rabinowicz-Eisenmann, owner of a tenement house at Konstantynowska Street 5, where Włast was raised. He was introduced to cabarets and variety theaters in his hometown of Łódź, by sneaking into them, such as the theater Urania, owned by Teodor Junod, the father of the Polish film actor, Eugeniusz Bodo, secretly with his friend Julian Tuwim, a year older than him. The elegant atmosphere of the venues—the men in tuxedos, women in sequined dresses, and the spectacle of revue entertainment—left a lasting impression on him and inspired his ambition to pursue a theatrical career. Immediately after high school, he moved to Warsaw, where, as Andrzej Włast, a pseudonym that was made by Julian Tuwim, in his free time, he wrote a revue titled “Under the Walls of Warsaw”, which made his debut on December 20, 1914, at the Shareholder Theatre (preceding Tuwim's cabaret debut by a year). He also got a contract with the Teatr Wspólne (Participation Theatre) immediately after high school. He also studied Law at the University of Warsaw, along with History and Medicine from 1913 to 1915.

Twenty-year-old Andrzej Włast joined the 5th Infantry Regiment of the Polish Legions., in 1916. He would not go to the front, when it turned out he had literary experience, he was assigned to headquarters, to the Propaganda Department, where he organized cultural events, wrote propaganda posters and texts for the Polish Army, and organized cultural events.

The Legions were a unique formation, full of cultural figures. The young Włast made many contacts, which later helped him secure leadership positions in theaters. An ancedote about Wlast once said that, during a performance in the cafe "Adria", an instrumental performance of "Złociste chryzantemy" was performed. Wlast, who was reportedly irritated that the song had become a popular hit without being his own lyrical work, he spontaneously improvised and performed a parody version of the refrain, which disrupted the performance and caused a moment of confusion and scandal among the audience. The incident is further embellished in some versions by claims that the situation was not escalated due to the presence of influential generals connected to the Polish Legions, which helped prevent any official consequences.

One of Włast's first hits was the song "Vivat coalition!" from the patriotic revue "Vivat freedom" from 1915 – sung at the Miraż Theatre with great success as late as 1918 (after the revue's second premiere on November 12, 1918). During the war, as a young cabaret artist, he managed to appear at the Bi-Ba-Bo Theatre, after Julian Tuwim convinced him and Artur Szyk to restart the cabaret's activities in Lodz, and in May 1916 Włast became literary manager of Bi-Ba-Bo, for 11 days, launched his own revue titled Być albo nie być, and gave the green light to Tuwim's revue debut. In Bi-Ba-Bo, he also debuted the early satirical song Za 10 Lat, where Włast imagined the future of cabaret and included both himself and Tuwim (“Wim”). The joke was that artists would become fantastically wealthy and that a “Wim or Włast” would receive 7.50 for a song.

Apart from this, he appeared at Miraż, and Czarny Kot. On the 18th of March, 1918, at a meeting at the Café Udziałowa in Warsaw, he established ZAIKS, along with Julian Tuwim.

After the war, he collaborated with the Teatr Arystyczny (Artistic Theatre), Teatr Mały (Little Theatre), and Sfinks (Sfinks). In 1920, he began working with the best cabaret of the interwar period, Qui Pro Quo, where he worked alongside cabaret heavyweights such as Tuwim, Hemar, and Fryderyk Jarossy. One of his greatest hits of this time period was "Uj, ta Wiosna!"

Włast was described as both shy and romantically inclined, and he wrote love poetry, though these efforts did not significantly advance his personal romantic life. It is said that someone told him that "his only chance at success in love", could be achieved through the creation or co-creation of popular songs, which he took seriously, despite already having written several patriotic and political compositions. Acting on this idea, he attempted to establish himself in the genre of popular music, including an early romantic song composed with Franciszek Plewczyński, which he reportedly offered to Pola Negri in 1921. Although Negri accepted and even performed the piece, she is said to have either ignored or not understood its intended romantic subtext. Following this, Włast focused on promoting other performers, helping to launch the career of Stanisława Nowicka, later known as the “queen of tango.”

During this time, he also published his debut and only book of poetry, "Serce tatuowane" (Tattooed Heart) (1923).

Andrzej Włast published the film column series Dziesiąta Muza (Impresje) in the trade magazine Ekran i Scena between 1923 and 1924. His criticism was impressionistic in form and focused less on plot analysis than on acting, directing, visual style, and audience response. Włast frequently criticized contemporary German cinema for excessive artificiality, overuse of spectacle, theatrical acting, and reliance on monumental sets and technical effects at the expense of realism. He also repeatedly expressed dissatisfaction with Polish film production, accusing it of weak scripts, stage-like acting, and low artistic ambition despite adequate financial and technical resources. In contrast, he praised American films for their narrative clarity, realism, restrained acting, and effective use of cinematic means. A central theme of his criticism was film acting, particularly facial expression and gesture, which he regarded as the defining elements of the medium.

Włast remained in Tuwim's shadow, intimidated by his reputation and by the artistic prestige of the capital, Within a short time, however, Włast established himself in the field of popular songwriting. As new musical trends became fashionable in Warsaw, Tuwim and Włast became acquainted with the popular tune “Bubliczki”, reaching Poland from Bolshevik Russia in 1926. Tuwim intended to write Polish lyrics for it, Włast completed his own version immediately after their meeting, drafting the text during a brief stop in a café for some coffee and bagels. He then quickly incorporated the song into the revue “Klejnoty Warszawy” (“Jewels of Warsaw”), allowing his version to reach audiences before Tuwim had finished his adaptation. As a result, Włast consolidated his position as a songwriter capable of rapidly producing material for mass audiences, adapting quickly to changing trends and theatrical demands.

In July 1927, he became artistic director of “Perskie Oko.” In reality, he—the author of the most popular songs—was invited to save the failing theater, which featured stars such as Bodo, Zula Pogorzelska, Konrad Tom, Loda Halama, and others. However, the audience, already small, kept shrinking.

“Perskie Oko” closed after two months. Włast took a risk: he opened his own cabaret, “Nowe Perskie Oko.” He rented another hall with a larger audience and better stage. In November, the new revue theater opened with the program “The Audience Has the Floor” and became a success. Because the owners of the “Perskie Oko” brand sued him for using the name, Włast changed it to “Morskie Oko.”

In 1927, Włast formed a writing and composing partnership with Henryk Wars, together they would write many hits. They would also collaborate on Włast's new stage, Morskie Oko, this time his own venture. At 3 Jasna Street (in the building formerly occupied by Perskie Oko), Włast created Warsaw's first proper revue theater, modeled on the lavish Parisian stage spectacles such as the Moulin Rouge and, above all, the Casino de Paris, which he frequently visited from 1926 (drawing heavily on their programs). Włast was not only owner, director, and producer of “Morskie Oko,” but also its leading author. At Morskie Oko, Wars and Włast also transplanted the latest styles from overseas, Włast was always ahead of competitors. Several times a year he visited Paris, studying programs of famous cabarets such as Casino de Paris and Folies-Bergère, and used his observations in his work. After his trip to America, including New York and Los Angeles, new dances appeared in “Morskie Oko”: Charleston, cakewalk, two-step, black bottom. Wlast's heavy success was also due to his connections. He was extremely connected, having people from Jan Brzechwa to Antoni Slominski to Bodo and Ordonowna collaborate with him frequently. He was also a stakeholder and a member of the board of directors in Gebethner and Wolff, Poland's largest publishing company, which also enabled him to continuously promote sheet music, and the literary director and a stakeholder of the Syrena-Rekord recording company, which was Poland's main recording firm.

The theatre was based in the former Perskie Oko premises, redesigned as a modern revue space with a large stage, orchestra pit, and technical infrastructure suited for fast-changing multi-scene productions, allowing for frequent programme turnover typical of interwar revue economics. Unlike more literary cabarets such as Qui Pro Quo, Morskie Oko operated on a commercially driven model with high production turnover, often staging entirely new programmes several times per season in response to rapidly shifting audience tastes. It became closely associated with the star system of interwar Warsaw entertainment, regularly featuring leading performers of the period such as Hanka Ordonówna, Zula Pogorzelska, Konrad Tom, and Loda Halama, whose popularity helped define the theatre's mass appeal.

In 1929, members of the Morskie Oko revue troupe undertook a private trip to Poznań without Włast's knowledge. He later criticized the journey as "crazy", and very poorly planned, noting that the round trip took around sixteen hours, leaving only about one hour in the city, and stated that it had been undertaken “in secret" from him. Following the fatal car accident involving actor Witold Roland, Włast remained involved with the theatre, commented to the press on the aftermath, and reported that Eugeniusz Bodo was deeply affected by the event, even fainting during a performance, while members of the ensemble were emotionally distressed. He also assisted with post-accident formalities, assisting authorities, delivering the body back to Roland's family, and represented Morskie Oko at Roland's funeral, where he delivered Roland's funeral speech, a very touching one.

The economic crisis reduced audiences, and in 1933 “Morskie Oko” closed. The main reason was the declining popularity of revue theater. Włast shifted to operetta, then film revue, then back again to theater under different names and formats.

Włast, however, was undeterred and launched another project that same year – the Rex Theatre at 18 Karowa Street. It staged revues and mixed programmes written by Julian Tuwim, Marian Hemar, and Włast himself, becoming a major success. Włast later left the theatre to organize the production Gwiazda areny ("Star of the Arena") at the Staniewski Circus, with his good friends Eugeniusz Bodo and Hanka Ordonowna.

After Włast left, the theatre lost its stable artistic direction. Management began organizing ad hoc theatrical events instead of maintaining a coherent repertoire. The theatre experimented with a variety of productions—operettas, musical comedies, ballet evenings, and guest performances—in an attempt to find what audiences wanted. Despite these efforts, productions such as Tańce, hulanki, swawola... and Panie darmo failed to attract sufficient audiences. As a result, the theatre closed.

Later, the same location housed the Wielka Rewia music hall, run by Włast, occasionally, in the former arena of the Quid Pro Quo theatre. It operated until January 1939, before giving way to the small literary theatre Ali Baba (created with Kazimierz Krukowski).

After the outbreak of the war, Andrzej Włast remained in Warsaw and soon found himself in the ghetto. During the Invasion of Poland, he encouraged for the theatre workers of Ali Baba to keep acting, saying that the "show must go on".

As Dariusz Michalski writes, Włast was very heavily disliked by many of the inhabitants of the ghetto, due to his more Polonized, commercial role, so almost no one wanted to assist him. He was in bad shape in the ghetto from the start. When the Germans established the ghetto, he entered it with his parents. Within a week, he lost both parents. Those who saw him then said he aged quickly and looked deeply sad.

In the autumn of 1940, as the Warsaw Ghetto was being established, Andrzej Włast convened a meeting of Warsaw theatre artists at his apartment, inviting people such as Jerzy Jurandot, Stefania Godzińska, Michał Znicz, Edmund Minowicz, and Iwo Wesby, to discuss the situation of performers under the new conditions. He proposed organizing theatrical performances at the Melody Palace on Rymarska Street, having already discussed the idea with the venue's owner, in order to provide income for artists who lacked other means of support. The participants agreed to proceed with the plan and initially shared its administration, with proceeds to be divided equally among them. However, due to concerns about Włast's adaptation to the wartime conditions of more modest production standards, as Wlast was used to extravagant performances, the management of the enterprise was later transferred to Jerzy Jurandot, a decision supported unanimously, including by Włast himself.

He also performed at the Sztuka café on Leszno Street, but his songs were not as well received in the inhumane conditions of the Ghetto. Eventually, he was called into a forced labor battalion, but via WW1 connections got a job as a worker for a German firm. Eventually, during the Gross-Aktion Warsaw, he desperately tried to find a way out of the ghetto. According to Bernard Goldstein, a Bundist in the Ghetto, Wlast was to be taken to be shot at 13 Gensha Street, Warsaw, but survived via paying a ransom. After this near death experience, Wlast was destitute in the ghetto, and hysterical. Singer Ola Obarska and other friends on the Aryan side of Warsaw outside the ghetto arranged to rescue him. He reached the gate with a small satchel. However, seeing a German SS in uniform staring, he panicked and ran. The guard shot him, and Wlast died of his injuries.

== Legacy ==
Wlast was a tall, dark-haired, with horn-rimmed glasses and a slightly bald head. He was eager and friendly to welcome debutants who brought their manuscripts, and he loved to create new stars. Unmarried, he devoted himself entirely to his favorite pastime. A workaholic and demanding boss, he dismissed actors who were lazy or failed to meet expectations, however. He was said to be able to write a hit song between sips of coffee, and participated heavily in Varsovian cultural life, being seen at all major events and balls, and frequently participating at motor racing tournaments across Poland, even winnng a major tournament in 1928 in Krakow. A lover of motor vehicles, he owned an Packard.

As others say - Włast consciously and deliberately lowered himself to the level of a suburban pub, a mangle, the amorous chatter of semi-literates. He mainly treated poetry like something made quickly for an audience,

Critics emphasized that his lyrics, in terms of style—especially against the backdrop of the progressive and contemporary language of Hemar and Tuwim's texts—were a return to the Young Poland movement. But it was his songs that the streets—and not just Warsaw—sang with relish. Marian Hemar recalled:

"Before the war in Warsaw, Tuwim and I were supposedly writing the best songs. But the hits that went straight from the stage to the streets of Warsaw, Łódź, Radom, that blared from radio and gramophone speakers – only Andrzej Włast could write these. He was said to have a series of rhymes prepared, to which he would then add more or less appropriate words, recalled cabaret actor Kazimierz Krukowski (Lopek). Słonimski and Boy-Żeleński laughed at them, writing that "his songs have the valuable property that they can be sung backwards and in all directions – a spring of happiness, a swarm of dreams, the heat of songs, the charm of caresses." Włast didn't pretend to be a poet; he was more of a craftsman who delivered new products on time (often weekly in the cabaret). Sometimes even ahead of schedule, keeping his finger on the pulse of new developments and staying ahead of the competition. As Groński writes:

"When Gypsy rhythms became fashionable, he switched to Gypsyism, when Russia came into fashion via Paris, he quickly overtook Tuwim and translated Bubliczki."

He was also a pioneer in the field of szmonces—a popular genre in Polish cabaret that exploited the humorous qualities of Jewish Polish (the sketch "Uś, Wiosna ta"). His szmonces, the first in Polish cabaret, were performed by Józef Urstein (Pikuś). His first hit song, "Gołda," sung by Janina Madziarówna, also referenced szmonces.

All those who remember Włast emphasize his exceptional intelligence (which also explains the frequent accusations of cynicism). Jerzy Jurandot says as to why he focused on mass commercialization: I think he simply quickly realized that a song's street popularity depends primarily on its melody, and to a much lesser extent on its lyrics, while the composer's and lyricist's income depends on the song's popularity. Having gained this awareness, he abandoned all literary ambitions and, with complete cynicism, embarked on a serial production of melodramatic, tear-jerking masterpieces."

Andrzej Włast expressed a distinctly anti-elitist attitude toward literature and literary criticism. In his only published volume of poetry, Serce tatuowane (Tattooed Heart), he openly distanced himself from professional critics. In the poem “Krytykom” (“To the Critics”), he rejected scholarly interpretation of his work, declaring that he valued the opinions of ordinary readers more highly than expert criticism. This stance reflected his broader conviction that literature should be addressed to a popular audience rather than to literary elites.

Włast articulated his worldview more explicitly in the poem “Ewangelia” (“The Gospel”), where he dissociated himself from poets associated with philosophical or symbolic traditions, such as Leopold Staff and Maurice Maeterlinck. In contrast to their idealism, Włast presented a bleak and cynical vision of reality, portraying the world as morally degraded and everyday life as governed by material and mundane concerns.

A particularly revealing text in Serce tatuowane is the poem “Prostytucja” (“Prostitution”), which is often read in a biographical context. The poem depicts writing as a form of commercial transaction carried out under time pressure and external demand. The act of producing commissioned work is presented as leading to a sense of inner death and creative exhaustion. Although the speaker is praised for his talent and rewarded financially, he experiences a loss of personal authorship and emotional connection to his work. The poem concludes with the admission that, despite continuing to write, the resulting texts no longer feel authentically his own.
