= De moribus tartarorum =

De moribus tartarorum (On the Custom of Tatars) may refer to one of the following treatises:

- De moribus tartarorum, lituanorum et moscorum by Michalon Lituanus
- De moribus tartarorum. Itinerarium orientis by William of Rubruck
