= Huragan =

1928 film

- Directed by: Józef Lejtes
- Written by: Jerzy Braun
- Starring: Zbigniew Sawan; Renata Renee; Aleksander Zelwerowicz
- Cinematography: Hans (Jan) Theyer, Juliusz Mars
- Production company: Polska Wytwórnia Filmów Historycznych
- Release date: March 16, 1928 (Poland)
- Running time: 117 minutes
- Country: Poland
- Language: Silent film

You may also be looking for ORP Huragan.

Huragan is a Polish historical film directed by Józef Lejtes. It was released in 1928.

== Plot ==
The film takes place in Congress Poland in 1863. Magrave Aleksander Wielopolski, proponent of peace with Russia, convinces Russian authorities to conscript young Polish activists into the Russian Army (for 20-year service), to avoid their uprising. One of the conspiration leaders, Tadeusz, avoids the conscripts and saves beautiful Helena from the hands of a Russian officer Ignatow. The January Uprising starts.

== Cast ==
- Zbigniew Sawan – Tadeusz Orda
- Renata Renee – Helena Zawisza
- Aleksander Zelwerowicz – Aleksander Wielopolski
- Robert Valberg – count Ignatow
- Jonas Turkow – barkeep
- Marian_Jednowski – Andrzej Zawisza
- Artur Socha – forestry worker
- Lucjan Żurowski – Ignatow' aide
- Ada Kosmowska – Helena's mother
- Janka Leńska – Janka, Helena's sister
- Oktawian Kaczanowski
- Janusz Star
- Jaga Boryta
- Jerzy Klimaszewski
- Aleksander Suchcicki
- Zbigniew Ziembiński
- Helena Buczyńska
- Janusz Dziewoński
- Karol Hanusz
- Henryk Małkowski
