= Karol Hanusz =

Polish actor (1894–1965)

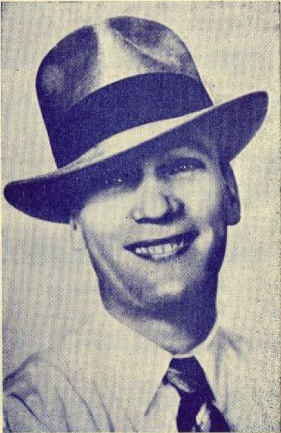
- Born: 30 May 1894; Warsaw, Poland
- Died: 20 December 1965 (aged 71); Warsaw, Poland
- Other names: Paweł Weiss, Józef Czarnecki, W. Lepecki, I. Trembecki, Władysław Kochański, S. Wasilewski, J. Kelter, Andrzej Kulesza, St. Ostrowski (artistic pseudonyms for music recordings)
- Years active: 1911–1965
- Known for: Huragan, song recordings for Syrena Rekord

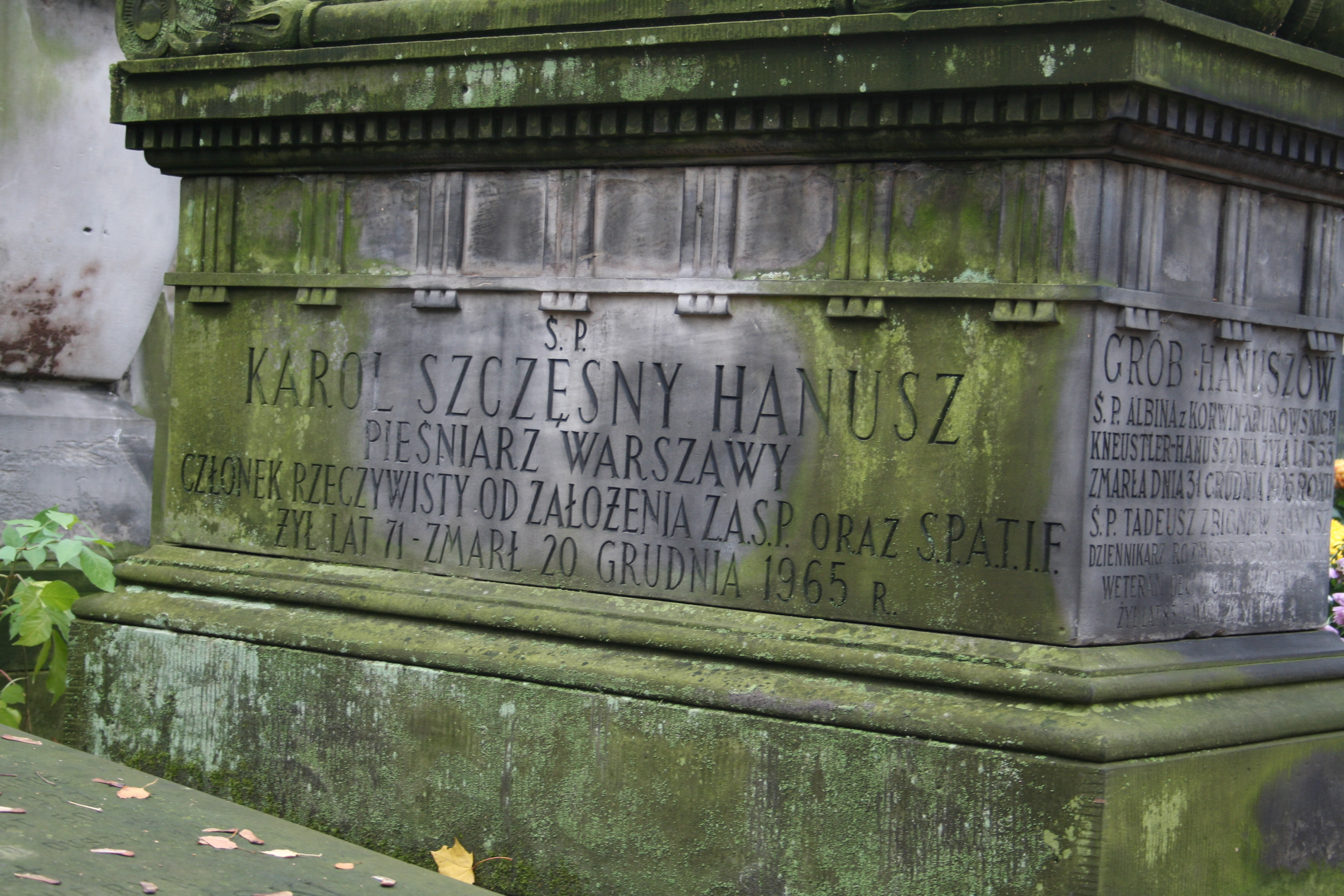
Grave in Powązki Cemetery

Karol Szczęsny Hanusz (30 May 1894 – 20 December 1965) was a Polish theatrical, cabaret and silent film actor and singer (baritone). He was one of the first Polish cabaret stars.

== Life ==
Hanusz was born on 30 May 1894 to Jan and Albina nee Korwin–Krukowska in Warsaw, but grew up in Kraków. After attending and graduating a classical high school (1909–1911) he went to a drama school in Kraków, and had private singing lessons.

Around 1910 Hanusz started recording songs. He did records for various companies under various pseudonyms; in Syrena Rekord: J. Czarnecki, W. Lepecki, J. Satalecki, I. Trembecki, S. Wasilewski, Władysław Kochański; in „Płyta Polska” J. Czarnecki, J. Kelter, Andrzej Kulesza, St. Ostrowski. As Paweł Weiss he recorded songs for „Pathe”, „Stella Concert Record”, „Efte Płyta”, „Płyta Polska”, „Beka”, „Scala Record” and „Grand Gala Record”.

In 1911, Hanusz made his stage debut with a performance at the Polish Theater in Sosnowiec. At first he played in the province. He performed, among others in the Theater of Zagłębie Dąbrowskie, Częstochowa and Łódź (1915, Bi-Ba-Bo Theatre). Only in 1916, after moving to Warsaw, did he become a famous cabaret and revue actor. He performed in almost all revue theaters in Warsaw, such as "Miraż", "Chochoł", "Sfinks", "Czarny Kot", "Qui Pro Quo", "Perskie Oko", "Morskie Oko", "Cyrulik Warszawski", "Ateneum." He cooperated with the State Enterprise of Stage Events (Państwowe Przedsiębiorstwo Imprez Estradowych). In Warsaw Hanusz was one of the first artists to promote tango songs on Polish scenes, singing Ostatnie Tango (The Last Tango) by Emile Deloire in Czarny Kot in 1919, and earning the moniker of "The King of Tango".

Between 1922 and 1928 Hanusz had cameo roles in four silent films; the last production he acted in was Huragan (1928).

From 1937 Hanusz also performed in France. He was counted among the most renowned cabaret artists. He was also one of the first Polish cabaret stars. During World War II, he performed in public (German-directed) revue theaters and sang in cafes.

After war Hanusz was back to stage performances for many theaters, where he sang songs, performed monologues and parody sketches. His repertoire included songs by Julian Tuwim, Lucjan Konarski, Zofia Bajkowska, Jerzy Boczkowski and others.

In 1964 Hanusz held a jubilee of 55 years of artistic work.

Hanusz was a member of Union of Polish Stage Artists (ZASP) and SPATiF (Association of Polish Theatrical and Film Actors).

In the artistic circles it was no secret Hanusz was gay. He was famously a friend of Eugeniusz Bodo (nowadays speculated to have been a relationship) and Hanka Ordonówna, whose artistic pseudonym came from Hanusz' idea.

Hanusz died 20 December 1965. He was murdered in his apartment by a man he picked up while cruising, a fate of many gay men whose lives in the Polish People's Republic were relegated to the (often dangerous) underground because of societal homophobia. He was buried in a family grave on Powązki Cemetery, with an epitaph "Pieśniarz Warszawy" (The Warsaw's Singer).

== Filmography (silent films) ==
- Huragan, 1928
- Przeznaczenie, 1928
- Od kobiety do kobiety, 1923
- Wszystko się kręci, 1922

== Discography (selected) ==
- 1927 – J. Trembecki artysta Teatrów Krakowskich śpiew, Syrena Rekord (SR 3030, 3031)
- 1927 – W. Lepecki znany pieśniarz kabaretowy, Syrena Rekord (SR 3129–3132)
- 1927 – I. Trembecki artysta Teatrów Krakowskich śpiew, Syrena Rekord (SR 3134, 3133)
- 1927 – W. Lepecki piosenkarz kabaretowy, Syrena Rekord (SR 3151–3152)
- 1930 – S. Wasilewski artysta Teatrów Krakowskich śpiew, Olimpia (505–509)
- 1930 – Władysław Kochański artysta Teatrów Krakowskich śpiew, Olimpia (510–541)

== Bibliography ==
- Adrjański, Zbigniew (2002). Kalejdoskop estradowy : leksykon polskiej rozrywki 1944–1989 : artyści, twórcy, osobistości. Warszawa: Bellona. ISBN 83-11-09191-9.
- Sempoliński, Ludwik (1977). Wielcy artyści małych scen. Warszawa: Czytelnik.
- Lerski, Tomasz (2003). Syrena Record : pierwsza polska wytwórnia fonograficzna = Poland's first recording company : 1904-1939. Karin. ISBN 83-917189-0-5.
