= Hanka Ordonówna =

Singer, dancer and actress

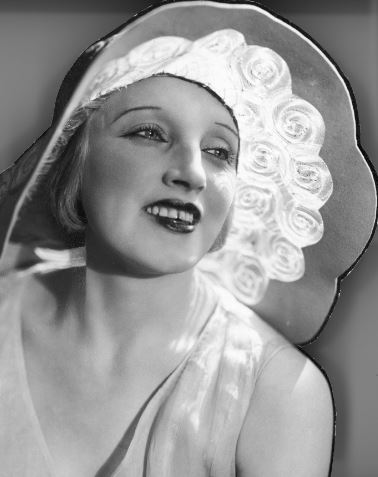
- Ordonówna in 1930
- Born: Maria Anna Pietruszyńska; 4 August 1902; Warsaw, Congress Poland, Russian Empire
- Died: 8 September 1950 (aged 47); Beirut, Lebanon
- Resting place: Powązki Cemetery
- Occupations: Actress, singer
- Years active: 1918–1939
- Spouse: Count Michał Tyszkiewicz (m. 1931)

Hanka Ordonówna or Ordonka (born Maria Anna Pietruszyńska; 4 August 1902 in Warsaw – 8 September 1950 in Beirut) was a Polish singer, dancer and actress.

== Life ==
She began her career at the age of 16 in a Warsaw cabaret named Sfinks and then the theater Wesoły Ul (Merry Hive) in Lublin under the stage name Anna Ordon, invented by her fellow actor friend Karol Hanusz. There she was singing hits still popular today: "O mój rozmarynie" (Oh My Rosemary), "Rozkwitały pęki białych róż" (White Rosebuds Were Blooming), and "Ułani, ułani" (Uhlans, Uhlans).

When this cabaret closed, Hanka Ordonówna moved to Warsaw and worked at the cabaret Miraż, where she was spotted by Fryderyk Jarosy, director of the Warsaw cabaret Qui Pro Quo; it was under his guidance that she became a star, recording "Miłość ci wszystko wybaczy" (Love Will Forgive You Everything, song by Henryk Wars and Julian Tuwim) in the 1933 movie Szpieg w masce (A Masked Spy). Another hit was Marian Hemar's Jakieś małe nic (Some Little Nothing), 1934.

In 1931, she married Count Michał Tyszkiewicz, who wrote many of her songs. Though a Countess, she continued to perform on a cabaret stage, and even rode a horse in a circus revue. She developed lung disease, which plagued her for the rest of her life. She died in 1950 in Beirut.

== Selected filmography ==
- The Little Eagle (1927)

== See also ==
- List of Poles
