= Michał Tyszkiewicz (envoy) =

Lithuanian noble and diplomat (fl. 1533–1552)

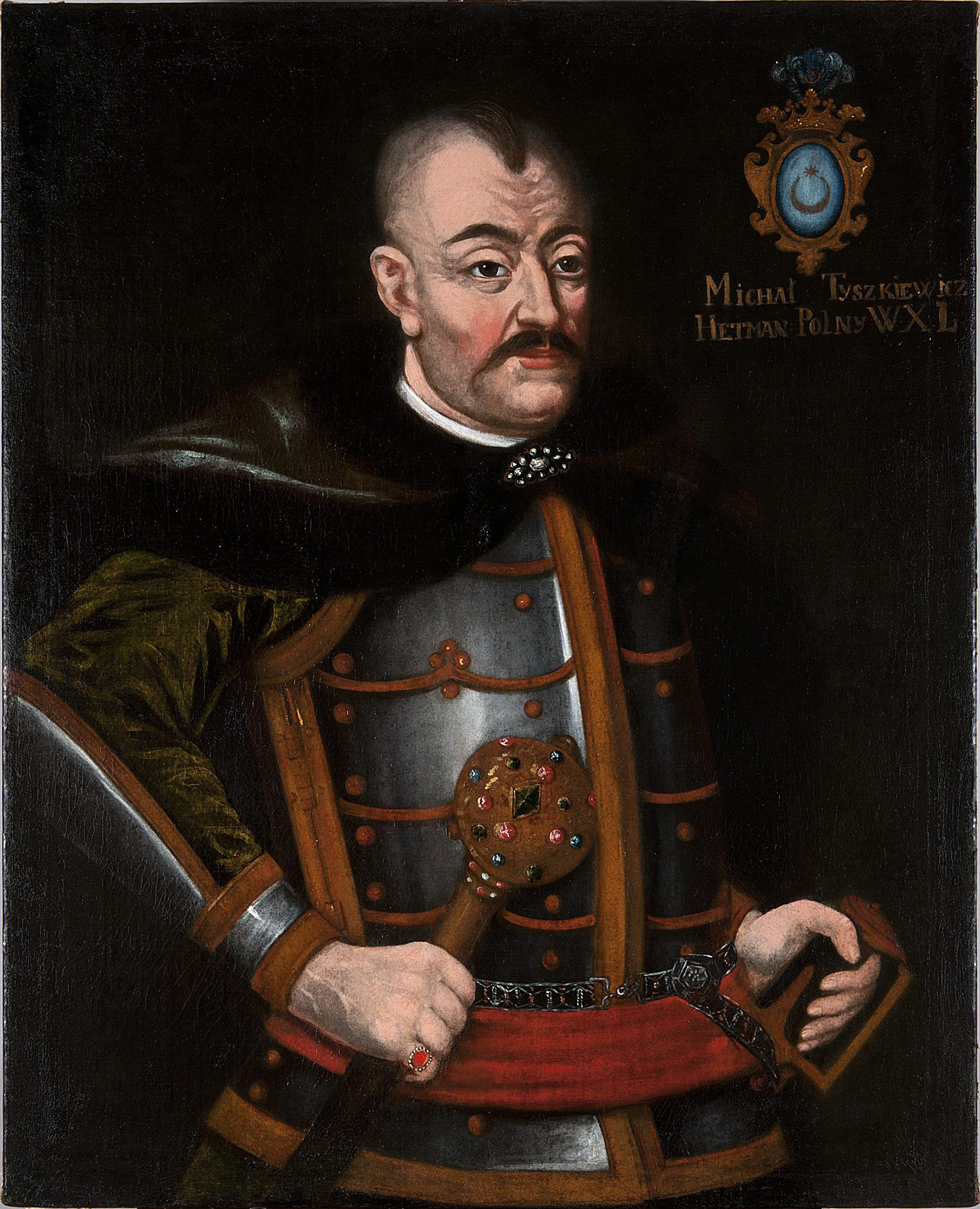
Portrait, 1794

Michał Tyszkiewicz (Ukrainian: Михайло Тишкевич; Lithuanian: Mykolas Tiškevičius; fl. 1533–1552) was a Ruthenian noble from the Grand Duchy of Lithuania. He was the youngest son of Tyszko, founder of the Tyszkiewicz family. He served as the diplomatic envoy to the Crimean Khanate in 1537 but was detained and released only in 1540.

== Biography ==
Tyszkiewicz and his four brothers served at the royal court of the Grand Duke Sigismund I the Old. Most successful of them was Vasyl Tyszkiewicz who became Voivode of Podlaskie and Voivode of Smolensk. Michał Tyszkiewicz was mentioned in surviving records for the first time in 1533 when received permission from the Grand Duke to marry Petronilla, widow of Glinsky. She was older and wealthier and brought several estates as her dowry.

Tyszkiewicz was sent as an envoy to the Crimean Khanate in 1537. At the time, Poland–Lithuania feared an attack by Suleiman the Magnificent, returning victorious from the first campaign of the Ottoman–Safavid War. Tyszkiewicz was sent to renew peace with Khan Sahib I Giray. However, Khan detained Tyszkiewicz and demanded that Poland–Lithuania increased its tribute. Grand Duke Sigismund refused and threatened war. The peace was concluded and Tyszkiewicz returned at the beginning of 1540.

In 1537, Tyszkiewicz received a manor near Eišiškės from the Grand Duke Sigismund I the Old. The manor was set on fire by two men sent by Mykolas Pašicas, the manor's previous owner, in 1550. The fire destroyed one building with 18 body armors and damaged others. The armor and other military equipment destroyed by fire is indicative of Tyszkiewicz's military service during the Muscovite–Lithuanian Wars.

== Michalonis Lithuani? ==
In 1929, Russian historian Matvey Lubavsky published an article identifying Tyszkiewicz as the author of the Latin treatise De moribus tartarorum, lituanorum et moscorum. The treatise was published in 1615 and identified its author in genitive as "Michalonis Lithuani", which is often reconstructed as Mykolas Lietuvis or Michael the Lithuanian. Lithuanian historian Ignas Jonynas came to the same conclusion. They based their argument on the first name and on the fact that both men spent time in Crimea.

However, Polish historian Jerzy Ochmański disproved the theory as "Michalonis Lithuani" identified himself as a Catholic and Tyszkiewicz was an Eastern Orthodox Ruthenian. Ochmański proposed that Michalonis is not the first name but a patronymic on the verge of becoming a last name and identified the author as Vatslav Nikolayevich (Vaclovas Mikalojaitis, Wacław Nikołajewicz), who served as a secretary in the Grand Duke's chancery for about 30 years.

== Bibliography ==
- Jonynas, Ignas (1966). "„Fragmentų" autorius". In Lietuvis, Mykolas (ed.). Apie totorių, lietuvių ir maskvėnų papročius (PDF) (in Lithuanian). Vilnius: Vaga. OCLC 20774980.
- Lubavsky, Matvey (1966). "Kas buvo Mykolas Lietuvis, XVI a. viduryje parašęs traktatą „Apie totorių, lietuvių ir maskvėnų papročius"". In Lietuvis, Mykolas (ed.). Apie totorių, lietuvių ir maskvėnų papročius (PDF) (in Lithuanian). Vilnius: Vaga. OCLC 20774980.
- Patiejūnienė, Eglė (2012). "Mykolas, vardu Venclovas, arba Mykolo Lietuvio asmenybės mįslė". Orbis Lituaniae (in Lithuanian). Vilnius University.
