= Ron Davis (jazz musician) =

Canadian jazz pianist

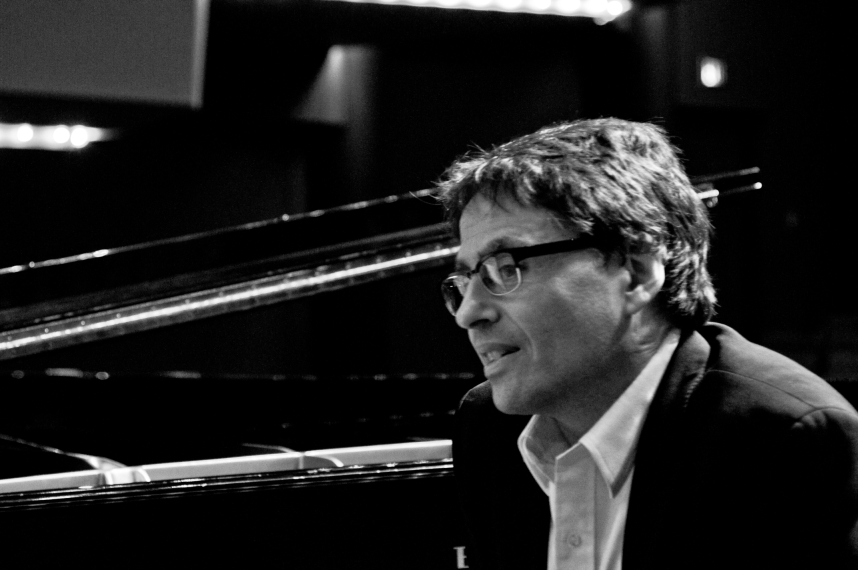

Background information
- Born: Toronto, Ontario, Canada
- Genres: Jazz
- Occupations: Musician, composer
- Instrument: Piano
- Website: rondavismusic.com

Ron Davis is a Canadian jazz pianist.

== Early life ==
Davis is the youngest son of Alex Davis and Alice Davis(née Ladowsky). His maternal grandfather was Józef Ładowski, a Polish restaurateur who owned a restaurant in the 1920s and early 1930s in Warsaw. The 1930s Polish song, Bal u Starego Joska, cites this restaurant and refers to Ładowski (Gruby Josek).

Davis's parents survived The Holocaust as inmates of the Bergen-Belsen concentration camp (father) and the Skarżysko-Kamienna labour camp (mother) before settling in Toronto, Canada, in 1948.

Davis was enrolled at the Royal Conservatory of Music to study theory and piano. He studied with teacher Darwyn Aitken, a student of both Oscar Peterson and David Saperton. At thirteen, Davis made his public debut playing the Maple Leaf Rag at a convention held by the Toronto Ragtime Society. At sixteen, Davis made his professional debut when he performed at the grand opening of a Toronto restaurant.

He continued to perform as a jazz pianist as a teen and young adult in clubs as he made his way through university and law school.

== Education and early career ==
Davis studied French at the University of Toronto. He wanted to continue on to graduate studies but his parents were adamant that he become a lawyer. He was able to make a compromise with them by studying law at the University of Ottawa Faculty of Law where they had just launched a French common law program.

Davis received his J.D. law degree in 1982 and completed his articles with Philip M. Epstein, doing civil litigation and solicitor negligence defence work, sharing space with criminal lawyer Edward Greenspan. In 1984 he was called to the Ontario bar.

Two years after his call to the bar, Davis ran into a professor and mentor from his undergraduate years who encouraged him to return to academia and do graduate work in French. From 1987 to 1993, Davis completed a Masters and PhD in French Linguistics at the University of Toronto. His thesis was titled Chronosemantics: A Theory of Time and Meaning and won him the 1993 University of Toronto French Department Doctoral Thesis Prize. He also was given a position as an assistant professor in the French Department.

== Professional music ==
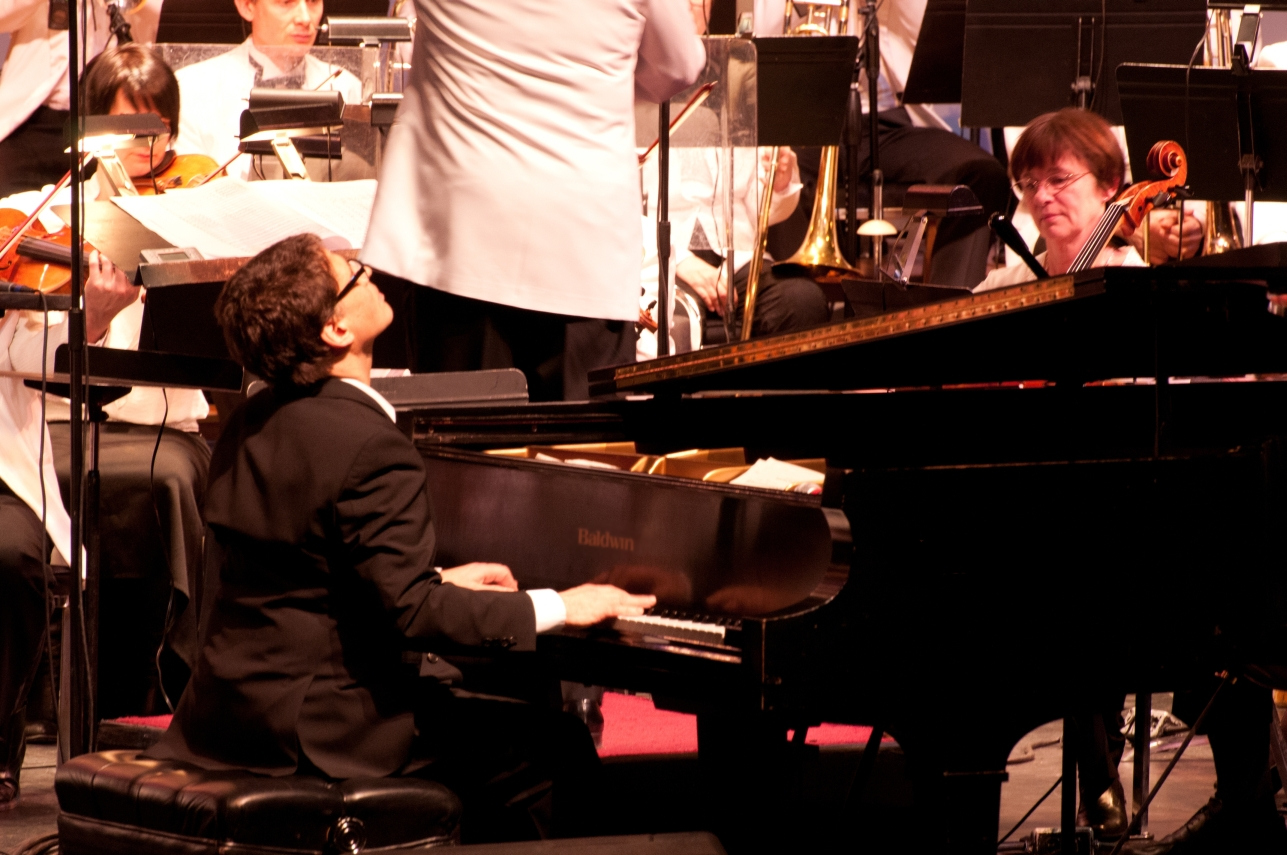
Ron Davis performing Symphronica with the Windsor Symphony Orchestra

In 1997, Davis met jazz saxophonist, Doug Banwell, who convinced him to resume playing piano. The duo started playing gigs regularly, and Davis began to focus on music full-time. Davis credited the law, in part, for his success in the music business. In an interview with the Law Times, he said that the law taught him to deal with loss, pressure, and adversity.

In music, as in all arts, you have to learn to accept rejection constantly...Some cases are won because the lawyer asserts them with great conviction and belief. It's the same in the arts," he says. Art is a form of persuasion. I'm always aware of the depth and beauty of the music I'm making.

Since 1997, Davis has performed live, and recorded music. He created Symphronica, a classical jazz fusion. Davis has recorded albums in various size ensembles (from duos to symphonies) and styles, such as chamber jazz, straight-ahead, and electric.

In 2018 he completed a third year of performances in Scotland at the Edinburgh Festival Fringe.

And in 2020, Davis' twelfth studio album, Symphronica Upfront, was nominated for a Juno Award for Instrumental Album of the Year.

Davis derives his style from the swing and bop eras. He cites pianists Oscar Peterson, Art Tatum, and Thelonious Monk as inspirations. In an interview with the National Post, Davis described said, "One of the things about this music is it's handmade."

== Personal life ==
Davis is married to singer Daniela Nardi. In 2012, he co-produced her album Espresso Manifesto.

== Discography ==
Year recorded	Title	Label	Personnel/Notes
2001	Solo Duo Trio	Cullinor	
2003	So Much	Cullinor/Rosemary Lane	Jazz Album of the Year nominee – Canadian Independent Music Awards
2004	Mungle Music	Davinor	
2005	Shimmering Rhythm	Davinor/Minerva Road	Top 10 2005: JAZZ.FM91, CODA, Zeitgeist, l'Express
2007	Subarashii Live	Davinor/Minerva Road	No. 1 – ChartAttack, December 2007
2008	The Bestseller	Davinor/Minerva Road	Best of 2008 – JAZZ.FM91, SoundProof
2010	My Mother's Father's Song	Davinor/Minerva Road	Critics' Pick - Toronto Star - CD Release Concert
2013	Blue Modules	Davinor/Minerva Road	Best of 2013 – JAZZ.FM91
2013	Symphronica	Acronym/Universal	Top of National Radio Jazz charts February–March 2014
2016	Pocket Symphronica	Really	
2017	RhythmaRON	Really	
2018	SymphRONica UpfRONt	Really	2020 Juno Award Nominee (Instrumental Album of the Year)
2020	Instrumental Music Liberation Front	Really	
