= Józef Ładowski =

Polish restaurateur

- Born: c. 1900
- Died: 7 October 1932; Warsaw, Poland
- Resting place: Jewish Cemetery, Warsaw
- Other names: Josek Ładowski, Gruby Josek ("Fat Josek"), Fat Yosl
- Occupation: Restaurateur
- Known for: Tavern U Grubego Joska; subject of the song Bal u starego Joska
- Spouse: Maria (Miriam) Lipowicz
- Children: 4
- Relatives: Ron Davis (grandson)

Józef Ładowski (Josek Ładowski, Gruby Josek, Fat Yosl, Yosek) (born c. 1900, died Oct. 7, 1932 in Warsaw) was a Polish restaurateur and main topic of the ballad Bal u starego Joska.

== Biography ==
In the 1920s and early 1930s, he was the owner of a small restaurant on Rynkowa Street (formerly known as Gnojna) 7 in the Jewish district of Warsaw. His tavern was a beloved place for Warsaw's rich and poor. Colonel Wieniawa-Długoszowski (at one moment president of Poland), marshal Piłsudski's personal adjutant, was frequent visitor and many others from Warsaw's high society.

=== Personal life ===
He married Maria (Miriam) Lipowicz, who had a bakery in Stopnica. He lived with his family at the Rynkowa (Market) Street 7 and had four children: Alicja Ładowska (Davis) (born 15 June 1925), Mieczysław, Ryszard, and Franciszka. Josek Ładowski's cousin Aaron (Arne) Ładowski arrived in Toronto in Canada in 1906 from Kielce and established the United Bakers Dairy Restaurant there in 1912 which still exists today (2016).

=== Death ===
When he died on October 7, 1932, at 11 pm, Warsaw's ABC newspaper reported that Gruby Josek was respected among Warsaw's criminal underground and that he had served as a judge in many disputes. He is buried in the Jewish Cemetery in Warsaw.

== In popular culture ==
The tavern was known as U Grubego Joska ("At Fat Joe's"). It was notorious enough that a song was written about it in 1934, Bal u starego Joska, which remains as one of the most popular Polish underground ballads often sung in the specific dialect of Warsaw's Praga district.

Sleepless nights in Warsaw's quarter
I still trace them on my lips
At the Fatty Josek's tavern on the Dung Street
Gathered flower of the night.

His grandson Ron Davis recorded jazz versions of Bal u starego Joska on his 2010 album My Mother's Father's Song.
