= Daniela Nardi =

Canadian singer and songwriter

- Origin: Toronto, Ontario, Canada
- Genres: Jazz pop rock world electronica
- Occupations: Musician; Composer
- Instrument: voice piano
- Website: www.danielanardi.com

Daniela Nardi is a classically trained Canadian singer and songwriter based in Toronto, Ontario. She studied music from the age of five at the Royal Conservatory of Music in Toronto, and her studies culminated in a Bachelor of Fine Arts in Music from York University.

She has composed for various independent films, and her resume includes experience as an actor and voice-over artist. Nardi has performed in Toronto clubs (The Montréal Bistro, Lula Lounge) and at festivals in both Canada (Rimouski Jazz Festival, Distillery Jazz) and abroad (in front of 100,000 people at a festival in Indonesia, in tandem with her jazz piano-playing husband, Ron Davis.

In 2009 she was chosen as the Best Female Vocalist at the Canadian Smooth Jazz Awards.

In 2024, she was appointed as Executive Director of the Toronto Mendelssohn Choir.

== Material ==
Nardi focuses on her life as inspiration for her songwriting. Her first album One True Thing deals with her childhood. Her second, The Rose Tattoo, deals with her mother's battle with cancer and eventual death.

== Discography ==
- One True Thing (2003)
- Espresso Manifesto: Songs of Paolo Conte (2006)
- The Rose Tattoo (2008)
- Canto (2015)
