= Concerto for Piano and Orchestra (Wars) =

Piano concerto written by Henryk Wars in 1950

- Milky Way Concerto
- by Henryk Wars
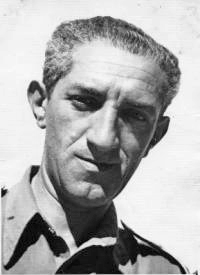
- Henryk Wars c. 1944
- Key: F minor
- Style: Neo-romantic
- Form: Piano concerto
- Composed: 1950
- Duration: 10 minutes

Premiere
- Date: late 1950s
- Location: Hollywood Bowl, Los Angeles, United States
- Conductor: Henry Vars
- Performers: Harry Sukman (piano)

The Concerto for Piano and Orchestra in F minor, is a symphonic work for piano and orchestra completed by Henryk Wars in 1950. The composer gave the work's public debut in Hollywood, later the same decade, with his friend and student Harry Sukman providing the piano part.

The piece is a one-movement piano concerto incorporating melody of one of Wars' nostalgic wartime songs "Po mlecznej drodze" (1942) (Note: Eng. "Along the Milky Way") with lyrics by a poet Feliks Konarski about longing for Warsaw. The inclusion of this material may have inspired Wars to consider giving his work the title of Milky Way Concerto, as evidenced in various sketches for the work held at the University of Southern California, in Los Angeles. The composition is often compared to the works of Rachmaninoff and Tchaikovsky.

== Background ==
Henryk Wars, a Polish composer of Jewish ancestry, was born in 1902 in the Russian partition of Poland. After Poland gained independence in 1918, Wars made a career in the 1930s as one of the pioneers of jazz in Central Europe and as a film music composer. He scored some of the most notable Polish films of the era, such as Neighbors (1937) and The Accidental Sportsman (1940). The fact that his popular songs were included in most of films he worked at, made him the best-remembered hitmakers of the interwar period in Poland.

Shortly before the outbreak of World War II, Wars was drafted into the Polish Army and served in the defense of Poland in 1939. He organized later the new jazz band in 1940 in Soviet-occupied Lviv, where he also composed his first symphony. In late 1941, he and his musicians joined the Polish II Corps of Władysław Anders as part of the cabaret. At this time, in Iraq, Wars composed the nostalgic tune "Po mlecznej drodze" to the lyrics by a Polish poet and songwriter Feliks Konarski. The song, which was about returning the pre-war Warsaw with memories, was first sung by Irena Anders for the soldiers on their trek from Persia to Monte Cassino. The translated lyrics for the last chorus run as follow:

Along the Milky Way our thoughts run,
and maybe now they are over Warsaw.
And maybe they stopped their mad run,
and look at the sandy bank of the Vistula.

Along the Milky Way, thoughts rush into the world,
and are faster and bolder than the wind.
And they carry the faith that the time is getting closer,
When we will run along with them.

"Along the Milky Way" was also successfully used in Michał Waszyński's feature film, Wielka droga (1946), with Irena Anders in the lead. After being demobilized from the army in 1947, Henryk Wars emigrated to the US, where he made his name again as the film music composer. His title song for the adventure film Flipper (1963) became a minor hit in the 1960s.

Wars decided to return to his 1942 composition eight years later by basing upon it his only piano concerto. The inclusion of this material may have inspired Wars to consider giving his work the title of Milky Way Concerto or Starlight Concerto, as evidenced in various sketches for the work held at the University of Southern California, in Los Angeles. The solo piano intonation of this tune is taken up by the orchestra and rounded up in an extended buildup. Besides comparing Wars' concerto to the works of Rachmaninoff and Tchaikovsky, it is also compared to Richard Addinsell's Warsaw Concerto (1941) and George Gershwin's Rhapsody in Blue (1924).

== Recordings ==
A live recording of the Concerto for Piano and Orchestra made on 18 December 2016 is available on the 2017 compilation album by Polskie Radio called Henryk Wars: Symphonic Works, with Piotr Orzechowski performing the piano part.
