= ORP Huragan =

ORP Huragan may refer to:

- The planned ORP Huragan and ORP Orkan, or Improved Grom-class destroyers
- French destroyer Ouragan
