= Stanisława Nowicka =

Polish dancer and singer

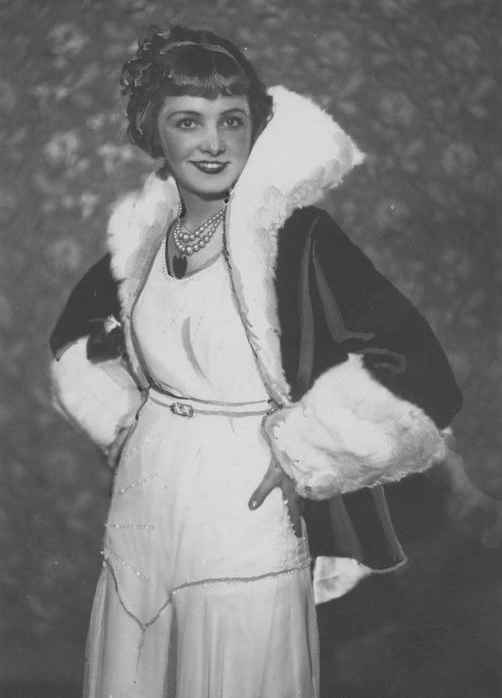
- Nowicka as Miss Zakopane 1931
- Born: 8 March 1905; Warsaw, Poland
- Died: 24 October 1990 (aged 85); York, New York, US
- Other names: Sylwia Nowicka; Stanisława Sowińska; Stacha Nowicka
- Occupations: Singer; dancer; medium
- Known for: Tango songs

Stanisława Nowicka (8 March 1905 – 24 October 1990) was a Polish dancer and singer, known as the "Queen of Tango".

== Life ==
Nowicka studied in Grand Theatre, Warsaw, debuting as a dancer in 1915. In 1916 she and Pola Negri danced in "Casino" theatre in Łódź. She debuted as a singer in 1920, and in the same year performed as a singer together with Karol Hanusz.

In 1927, she started working in „Nowe Perskie Oko”, then "Morskie Oko", and then „Wesołe oko” cabaret. In 1929, she started recording songs for Syrena Rekord. The same year he gave Jerzy Petersburski's famous Tango Milonga (known in Europe as Oh Donna Clara) its debut in the Morskie Oko cabaret. Other songs she covered included tangos: „I tak mi ciebie żal”, „Nie odchodź ode mnie”, „Za dawno za dobrze się znamy”, and a popular song Chodź na Pragę for a revue Uśmiech Warszawy (1930). She performed as an actress and singer in Rycerze mroku (1932), her only film credit. Late 1934(?) or in 1936 the Polish daily Slowo Polskie sent her to New York as correspondent; she never returned. She ran a "Polish hour" in Radio Chicago, did some translation work and continued performing as a singer.

She was a spiritist and was considered a medium by many; she had a clairvoyance studio in Yorktown on Gomer Street, was active in the Theosophical Society in America. She used her medium skills by giving Aleksander Janta-Połczyński a diagnosis for his throat illness that supposedly came from "pre-World War One Greater Poland man" and by taking care of Jan Lechoń, who valued her spiritist prognoses and "Polish atmosphere" of her household.

She died in Yorktown in 1990, and has a symbolic grave on Bródno Cemetery in Warsaw.
