= Ola Obarska =

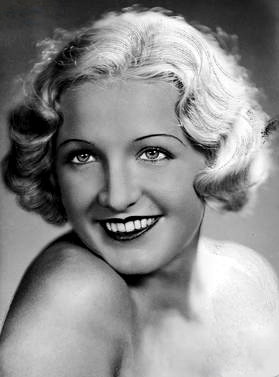
- Ola Obarska in 1933
- Born: Olimpia Obarska; 1 June 1910; Bromberg, German Empire (now Bydgoszcz, Poland)
- Died: 1 January 1994 (aged 83); Warsaw, Poland
- Occupations: actress, singer, songwriter
- Spouse: Zdzisław Forkasiewicz

Olimpia Obarska-Forkasiewicz (1 June 1910 — 1 January 1994), better known by her stage name Ola Obarska, was a Polish actress, operetta singer, librettist, theatre director, journalist and songwriter.

== Biography ==
Olimpia Obarska was born and grew up in Bromberg (now called Bydgoszcz). She graduated from Artur Rubinstein Music High School in Bydgoszcz, then studied at the Cours du Fanloup in Boulogne sur Seine, France.

She debuted in 1928 in the operetta Polska krew at the State Theatre in Bydgoszcz. In 1933, she moved to Warsaw, where she performed at the Warsaw Operetta and the Polish Theatre. In the late 1930s, Ola Obarska left Poland to perform in Vienna and Berlin. She returned to Poland in 1939 and began acting at the Grand Theatre in Warsaw.

During World War II, Obarska sang in Warsaw cafés, before joining the First Polish Army in 1944. She combat route to Berlin as a theater director and actress front-line.

After the war, she performed at the People's Theatre in Warsaw, and worked for Polish Radio. She also started writing songs; her songs were sung by Violetta Villas, Mieczysław Fogg, Rena Rolska, and many other Polish singers.

Obarska died on 1 January 1994 in Warsaw, and was buried at the Powązki Cemetery.
