= Ignas Jonynas =

Lithuanian diplomat, historian, and university professor

- Born: 24 January 1884; Atesninkai, Suwałki Governorate, Congress Poland
- Died: 14 July 1954 (aged 70); Kaunas, Lithuania
- Education: Imperial Moscow University; University of Grenoble
- Occupations: Diplomat, historian, professor
- Employer(s): Ministry of Foreign Affairs of Lithuania; University of Lithuania; Vilnius University

Ignas Jonynas (24 January 1884 – 14 July 1954) was a Lithuanian diplomat, historian, and university professor. As a diplomat he is known for negotiations with the Second Polish Republic and League of Nations regarding Vilnius Region. As a historian he specialized in the history of Lithuania in the 13–16th centuries and lectured at the University of Lithuania and Vilnius University from 1924 until his death. He published little, but had a formative influence on the subsequent generations of historians.

== Biography ==
From 1904, Jonynas studied history at the Imperial Moscow University under Matvei Lyubavsky, an expert on the Lithuanian Metrica—medieval archives of the Grand Duchy of Lithuania. Lyubavsky's critical approach to historical sources greatly influenced Jonynas. Jonynas participated in the Russian Revolution of 1905 and thus had to transfer to the University of Grenoble to study French language and literature. He also attended lectures on history at the University of Berlin. Acquitted by Russian courts, he returned to Moscow to finish his studies. After graduation in 1911, he worked as a school teacher in Noginsk and Moscow until 1919.

At the end of World War I, he returned to Lithuania and joined the People's Commissariat of Education of the Lithuanian Soviet Socialist Republic. After the failure of the Soviet government, he lived in Vilnius, worked as a school principal, and opposed Polish ambitions in the city. For a few months in mid-1920, he was the chief Lithuanian commissioner in the Vilnius Region. After the 1920 Żeligowski's Mutiny, during which Polish forces captured Vilnius, Jonynas moved to Kaunas and joined the control commission of the League of Nations to negotiate the dispute over the Vilnius Region. After the diplomatic efforts failed in 1922, Jonynas continued to be employed by the Ministry of Foreign Affairs of Lithuania until 1929. From 1924 until his death, he lectured at the University of Lithuania and Vilnius University, attaining professorship in 1932.

== Works ==
As a historian, Jonynas wrote little convinced that his works were not properly researched or that everything was already written by somebody else. He contributed articles on Lithuanian dukes, nobles, treaties, and other topics to the Lithuanian Encyclopedia, the first universal encyclopedia in the Lithuanian language. He studied and translated from Latin De moribus tartarorum, lituanorum et moscorum (posthumously published in 1966). His most important work was a study on the family of Vytautas, Grand Duke of Lithuania from 1392 to 1430. However, Jonynas helped to form a new generation of Lithuanian historians and raised their level of professionalism. He always critically analyzed primary sources and dismissed secondary sources—thus helping to rid Lithuanian historiography of mistakes, medieval legends and myths, foreign biases and stereotypes.
