= Tadeusz Olsza =

Polish film and stage actor

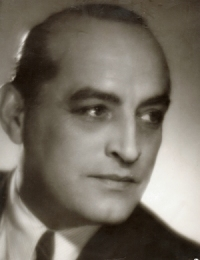
Tadeusz Olsza

Tadeusz Olsza (3 December 1895 – 1 June 1975), born Tadeusz Blomberg, was a Polish film and stage actor, cabaret singer, dancer and director born in Warsaw. From 1915 to 1917, he taught vocal classes at Warsaw Conservatory. Starting in 1921 he performed in such Warsaw cabarets and vaudevilles as Stańczyk, Karuzela, Nietoperz (The Bat), Stara Banda, Qui Pro Quo, Perskie Oko, Morskie Oko, Nowości, and Cyruliku Warszawskim. He was known for his parody of Felicjan Sławoj Składkowski, a Polish physician, general and politician.

He performed monologue, satires, revue sketches, vignettes and in musical theater; was also known as a great tango dancer, partnering Loda Halama and her sister Zizi in a hit musical review Tysiąc pięknych dziewcząt (A thousand beautiful girls) and performing with Stanisława Nowicka, "Queen of the Tango."

He began his film career in small roles in German films (Mater Dolorosa and Jugendliebe). In Poland his film appearances included Uwiedziona, Krzyk w nocy, O czym się nie mówi, Głos Serca, Antek Policmajster, Jaśnie pan szofer, and Jego wielka miłość.

Olsza worked in Polish Radio almost from its inception; some of his archived performances are still broadcast.

After the Nazi invasion of Poland he went to Bucharest, Romania, where he joined the group of Polish emigree theater artists. In 1941 he joined the Polish Army in France, then Scotland where he run the theatre for First Brigade of the Polish-Scottish Shooters (see Polish Army in the West).

After the war he returned to Poland where he performed in 1947, first in Kraków, then in Warsaw, as star of the first post-war Polish vaudeville (written by Julian Tuwim): Żołnierz królowej Madagaskaru (Soldier of The Queen Of Madagascar)). In 1948 he played the stages of Buffo and Syrena theaters; he remained with Syrena until his retirement in 1971. In 1972 he left for London, to join his wife, where he died in 1975.

He is buried at Ramsgate Cemetery, Cecilia Road in Ramsgate, Kent, England.

PERSONAL

In 1946 in Edinburgh, Scotland, Tadeusz married Priscilla Frances MacGregor-Brown. They met and courted while both served in uniform in Britain during WWII.

Priscilla was born on May 19, 1924, in Dunfurline, near Edinburgh, Scotland, the daughter of physician parents Dr. Robert Muir MacGregor and Dr. Phyllis MacGregor-Brown. She was educated at St. Serf's girls boarding school in Edinburgh and later as a librarian. During WWII she volunteered for duty with the British military and was detailed to the FANYs (First Aid Nursing Yeomanry), with further assignment to the elite SOE (Special Operations Executive) group. SOE detailed specially trained women to maintain communications with resistance movements in occupied Europe; as volunteers to train as wifeless operators; and as coders. Priscilla served as a communications coding cryptographer until discharge in 1945. Some of her military time was spent at the famed British communications and intelligence center at Bletchley Park in England.

Tadeusz and Priscilla lived in Warsaw, Poland, until his retirement in the late 1960s, during which time Priscilla was employed in the cultural attache's office of the American embassy. The couple relocated back to Britain in 1972. After Tadeusz died in 1975 Priscilla supported herself as a librarian at U.S. Naval headquarters in London and at the American High School in St. Johns Wood, London.

Tadeusz and Priscilla were survived by a daughter Bronislawa (son-in-law Leszek Tyburski), two grand children (George Tyburski and Fiona Tyburski-Archer) and a great grandson (Zachery Tyburski). As of 2023 All the decedents of Tadeusz and Priscilla Olsza Blomberg live in the suburbs of Detroit, Michigan, US.

In 1980 Priscilla married Captain James E. "Gene" Wentz, USN, in Toronto, Canada. She traveled with him to assignments at the Pentagon, The Defense Language Institute in Monterey, California, and the Naval War College in Newport, Rhode Island. After retirement from the navy the couple lived in London from 1984-88 before returning permanently to the Washington area.

(3) More biographical information about Priscilla Olsza Blomberg Wentz is contained in "A Wentz Family History," U.S. Library of Congress control number 2001131604.
