= Michał Zygmunt Tyszkiewicz =

Polish diplomat and songwriter

Michał Tyszkiewicz (25 May 1903 – 21 March 1974) was a Polish diplomat and songwriter. An heir to the once mighty Tyszkiewicz family, he is best known as the husband of Hanka Ordonówna, a star of Polish pre-war cinema and stages.

== Biography ==
Following the Soviet occupation of Vilnius, both Tyszkiewicz and his wife were arrested by the NKVD. Separated, they were reunited in Persia following their release after the Sikorski-Mayski Agreement. As part of the Anders' Army the couple organised evacuation of Polish children from USSR concentration camps to India. Tyszkiewicz also briefly served as the first secretary of the Polish Embassy in Tehran. After the war he could not return to Soviet-controlled Poland.

== Personal life ==
Tyszkiewicz was married to Hanka Ordonówna, a start of Polish pre-war cinema and stage. The couple adopted his nephew Jan Tyszkiewicz, son of Michał Tyszkiewicz's brother, who had been murdered by the NKVD in 1940.

Tyszkiewicz died in Munich on 21 March 1974.

== See also ==
- Tyszkiewicz family
