= De moribus tartarorum, lituanorum et moscorum =

16th-century treatise by Michalo Lituanus

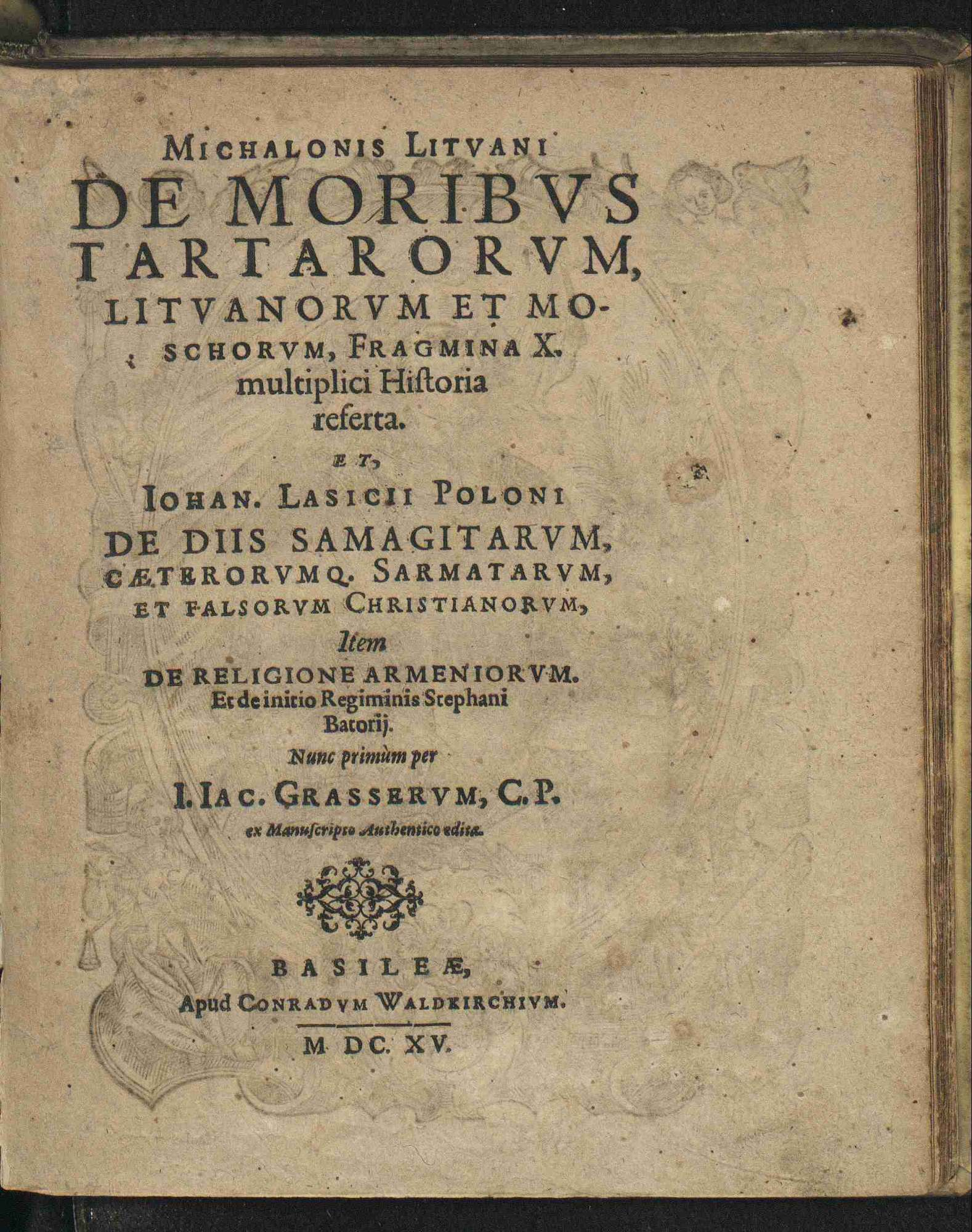
Title page of the book (1615)

De moribus tartarorum, lituanorum et moscorum ("On the Customs of Tatars, Lithuanians and Muscovites") is a 16th-century Latin treatise by Michalo Lituanus ("Michael the Lithuanian"). The work, which was originally dedicated to King of Poland and Grand Duke of Lithuania Sigismund II Augustus, survived only in ten fragments that were first published in 1615 by Johann Jacob Grasser in Basel, Switzerland.

== Content ==
The treatise is thought to date from around 1550: the author's ideas and writing style show the clear influence of humanism.

While the treatise contains some useful historical information, this should be treated with care. The work is neither a chronicle nor a travel book, but rather a political essay which is critical of the author's motherland (Grand Duchy of Lithuania) and overly praises Muscovy and the Crimean Khanate for their centralized governments and united subjects. The author examines the reasons behind Lithuania's decreasing power and influence, criticises the nobility and high Catholic officials, and advocates for a strong centralized government. He further idealizes the era of Vytautas the Great, when the ruling class supposedly did not pursue self-interests, and instead served the state.

Michalo supports the theory that the Lithuanian nation was founded by the legendary dynasty of the Palemonids from the late Roman Empire, and he proposes introducing Latin as the Grand Duchy's official language, thereby restoring forgotten ancestral traditions. As proof of the similarity between Lithuanian and Latin, Michalo includes a list of 74 words that are similar in the two languages. He also compares ancient Roman traditions with pagan Lithuanian customs. Furthermore, Michalo criticized the usage of Ruthenian language in the Grand Duchy of Lithuania and described refugees from Muscovy as "Muscovite spies".

== Author ==
The identity of the author – also known as Mykolas Lietuvis, Michalo Lituanus, Michałon (Michalon) Litwin, and Michalo the Lithuanian – is not known. In the book's title his name is given in the genitive as "Michalonis Lithuani" ("Michael the Lithuanian's").

Modern historians, including (Lithuanian) Ignas Jonynas and (Russian) Matvey Lubavsky, have identified the author as Michał Tyszkiewicz, the Lithuanian envoy to the Crimean Tatars in 1537–1539. However, Tyszkiewicz was an Eastern Orthodox while " Michalo the Lithuanian" identified himself as a Catholic.

Polish historian Jerzy Ochmański has proposed notary Vatslav Nikolayevich (Vaclovas Mikalojaitis or Wacław Nikołajewicz, c. 1490 – c. 1560) from Maišiagala. Nikolayevich began to serve Grand Chancellor of Lithuania Albertas Goštautas around 1526. In 1528 and from 1534 until his death, he was a secretary at the Grand Duke's Chancery. He was an envoy of the Grand Duchy of Lithuania to Moscow in 1537 and 1555–1556, and to Crimea in 1543.
