= Henryk Gold =

Polish-born American composer, arranger and orchestra director

- Born: Henryk Gold; 1902; Warsaw, Poland
- Died: 9 January 1977 (aged 74–75); New York City, United States

Henryk Gold (1902 – 9 January 1977 in New York City, United States) was a Polish-American composer, arranger, and orchestra director.

== Early life and family ==
Henryk Gold was born in Warsaw into a highly musical family. His mother, Helena (née Melodyst), came from the famous Warsaw klezmer family Melodysta, and his father, Michał Gold, was the principal flutist of the Warsaw Opera Orchestra. His father died suddenly on stage during a concert in 1904, when Henryk was only two years old. Gold's older brother, Artur Gold (1903–1943), also became a renowned composer and orchestra leader, but was murdered in Treblinka during the Holocaust. Henryk had two other brothers, Abram and Jaker, both musicians; Abram was killed in 1942, while Jaker's fate remains unknown. His grandfather, Wolf Zeew Gold, was also a klezmer musician.

Henryk Gold married Bronisława Gold (née 1911) in 1946, while they had met in 1942. Tragically, much of his family, including his first wife, daughter, and son, were killed during the Holocaust. His surviving relatives included a sister in Buenos Aires and two nephews, both musicians, whom Gold welcomed as his own family. Bronisława Gold remained in New York until her death in 1999. He lived in 124 W. 93rd Street, Upper West Side, Manhattan, but in the pre-war period, lived in 122 Chelmnia Street, with the rest of the Gold Family.

After his father's death, Henryk was sent to relatives in Tambov, Russia, where he began violin studies in 1907. He was later admitted to the Glazunov Conservatory and, following World War I, returned to Warsaw to continue his studies at the Warsaw Conservatory under Stanisław Barcewicz (violin) and Aleksander Michałowski (piano). By age seventeen, he was playing violin in the Warsaw Philharmonic and conducting a military orchestra. He also served in the Russian army during World War I and in the Polish army during the Polish-Soviet War of 1920, composing at least one military march.

== Early Career in Poland ==
In the early 1920s, Gold became interested in dance and jazz music, inspired by the European spread of jazz from bands such as the Original Dixieland Jazz Band. Following the example of saxophonist Zygmunt Karasiński, who had founded the first Polish jazz band in 1923, Gold and his brother Artur established an eight-piece jazz band in 1925 at Warsaw's Café Bodega. Their success led to a recording contract with Syrena Record, with early recordings including "Heebie Jeebies" and "Oh, Miss Hannah," alongside tangos and waltzes popular at the time.

Initially, Gold's orchestra played a salon-style, ragtime-influenced repertoire, but by 1929, with the addition of drummer Jerzy (George) Scott, the ensemble became a versatile dance orchestra. During the 1930s, Gold emerged as one of Poland's most popular musicians, recording for both Syrena Electro and Columbia Records, writing songs for films, and running the famed nightclub Adria in Warsaw alongside his brother and fellow composer Jerzy Petersburski. His orchestra accompanied many leading singers of the period, including Hanka Ordonówna, Adam Aston, Janusz Popławski, and Witold Conti. Henryk Gold's orchestra recorded many tangos, which made up around 2/3 of Polish dance music of the 1930s, and was extremely well regarded. Gold also composed music for films such as Niebezpieczny romans (1931), where he was photographed standing with the Polish President during the premier.

== World War II ==
In 1939, Gold and his orchestra were invited to perform at the World's Fair in New York as part of the Polish delegation. When World War II began on 1 September 1939, Gold and his band were in Lwów, which was occupied by the Red Army on 17 September, following the Ribbentrop-Molotov Pact. While Henryk survived, his brother Artur was killed in Treblinka in 1943.

Gold escaped eastward and, together with Jerzy Petersburski formed a large jazz-symphonic orchestra performing for Polish soldiers in the Soviet Union, By 1940, the orchestra, often referred to as "Blue Jazz," had made its way to Moscow, where it performed in prominent venues such as the Hermitage Garden, where with Jerzy Petersburski and Stanley Laudan, the song "Blue Handkerchief" was composed. It quickly became a mass hit in the USSR and was adapted into one of, if not the most famous song of the Great Patriotic War. To this day, the song is extremely well known in Post-Soviet countries, while its origins are less well known.

In 1942, Gold served as a sergeant in the Polish Armed Forces in the USSR, later joining the Propaganda and Education Department of the Polish Army on the Eastern Front. In April of that year, he arrived at the port of Pahlevi in Persia with the Wars Orchestra, then went on to Tehran. On May 10, 1942, he arrived in Palestine with the Czołówka Theatre. A concert program says that on August 12, 1942, he played for the Polish Red Cross – Palestine Branch – at the Ohel Theatre in Tel Aviv as part of the Artistic Ensemble of the Polish Army in the Middle East. The concert was organized to benefit the children of Polish refugees from the Soviet Union. During this period, together with Petersburski (piano) and Fred Melodyst (cello), he formed a trio, the Command's representative ensemble, performing at concerts and on important occasions. The trio gave concerts in Tel Aviv, Baghdad, and Tehran, among other places. Gold also performed with an orchestra and artists at the Europa Cafe in Zion Square in Jerusalem. The concerts lasted until October 4, 1943.

During his time in Palestine, Gold composed several songs for the local Jewish community, including Szalom ("Peace"), Arcenu ha-ktantonet ("Our Little Country"), and Ruach ("Wind"), sometimes under the pseudonym Cwi Zahavi (Zahavi meaning "gold" in Hebrew). These songs are famous in Israel, even today, and are an integral part of Israeli folk culture.

== Postwar Career ==
After the war, Gold spent time in Britain, returned to Palestine, and eventually moved to Belgium, performing as a virtuoso violinist in prestigious venues such as La Grande Taverne Palace in Brussels. He toured Germany, France, and Belgium, He was billed as "Le virtuose international" and was featured in the Belgian press. He toured Germany, France, and Belgium and composed the song "Le Violon de Paris." On April 19, 1951, he accompanied the great Yiddish singer Leo Fuld (1912-1997) with his orchestra at the French premiere of the film "L'aigle de désert," directed by Frederick De Cordova. In Paris, he worked as a violinist, recording for the "Saturne" Label, which includes pieces such as Autumn Leaves, and La Violon de Paris. In 1953, Gold emigrated to the United States permanently. With dancer Loda Halama, and a star-revue orchestra on October 10, 1953, performed a concert called "Fragments of Warsaw" to a crowd of around 3,000.

From 1953 to 1966, he directed the dance orchestra at the Plaza Hotel in Manhattan and performed at the Polish club Zielony Balonik (Green Balloon). He continued to record and lead orchestras for music halls, revues, and radio broadcasts, composing numerous dance tunes, some in English, and arranging American popular songs for violin, along with being the musical director for many Broadway plays. His repertoire from this period included classical pieces, tangos, foxtrots, and virtuosic solo violin works.

== Death ==
Henryk Gold retired in 1975 and died in New York City on 6 January 1977. He is remembered as one of the foremost conductors of Polish interwar dance orchestras, a virtuoso violinist, a prolific composer, and a bridge between European salon music, jazz, and American popular music.
