= Tadeusz Faliszewski =

Polish singer, cabaret actor and director of revues and operettas

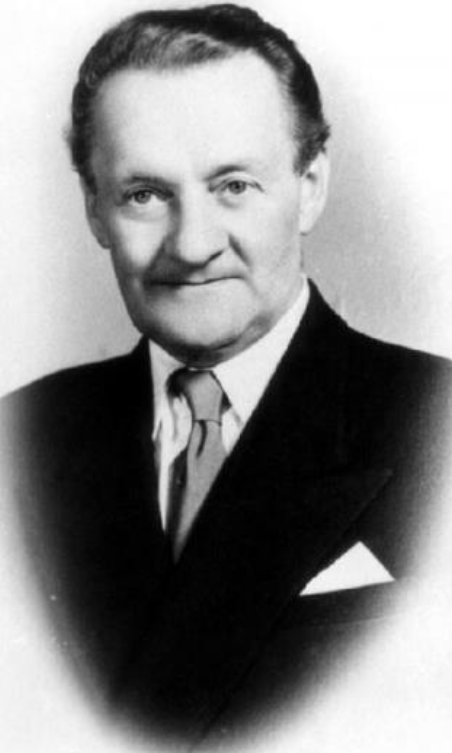

Background information
- Also known as: Jerzy Nowogrodzki, Jerzy Orowski, Jan Pobóg, Jan Saskowski
- Born: October 20, 1898; Zywiec, Galicia, Austria-Hungary
- Died: September 2, 1961 (aged 62) Chicago, USA
- Genres: pop music, tango, operetta
- Occupations: Singer, Actor
- Years active: 1922-1960
- Labels: Syrena Records
- Spouse: Halina Kidawska (1915-1960)

Tadeusz Faliszewski (also known under his scenic names: Jerzy Nowogródzki, Jerzy Orowski, Jan Pobóg, Jan Saskowski; 1898 in Żywiec – 1961 in Chicago), was a Polish singer, cabaret actor, director of revues and operettas.

== Life ==
Tadeusz was the son of Władysław Faliszewski and Matylda née Kirchner. He spent his childhood in Lviv, where he attended school. He graduated from the Lviv Polytechnic School.

During World War I, he fought in the ranks of the 3rd Squadron of the 1st Uhlan Regiment of the Polish Legions. From December 14, 1915, he was undergoing treatment at the Convalescent Home in Kamieńsk, and later in a hospital in Kraków.

During the war with the Bolsheviks, he was a liaison officer with the Ministry of Military Affairs. He was verified in the rank of lieutenant with seniority on June 1, 1919 in the corps of reserve officers of the administration, economic department. In the years 1923–1924 he was assigned in the reserve to the District Economic Plant No. IX in Brześć nad Bugiem. In 1934 he was in the corps of reserve officers of intendants.

He made his debut as an actor in 1922. His mother, who had tried her hand at singing in her youth, financed his expensive singing lessons entirely. He played on stages and stages in many Polish cities, including Kraków, Radom, Kalisz and Częstochowa In 1922 he devoted himself to artistic work . His mother, who had tried her hand at singing in her youth, financed his expensive singing lessons entirely. Tadeusz Faliszewski was first hired by the director of the traveling Kraków Operetta "Nowości", Tadeusz Pilarski. In the 1924/1925 season at the "Nowości" theatre in Poznań, he was already Lucyna Messal's partner (October 1924). Then he performed at the theatre in Kalisz. In the 1925/1926 season, he performed at the "Eldorado" theatre in Warsaw. In the following season, he was hired by the "Nowości" theatre in Częstochowa. In May 1927, Faliszewski made his first recordings for "Syrena Record". In 1927–1928, he performed at the "Mignon" musical theatre in Warsaw. From February 2, 1929 to February 24, 1930, he managed the newly built, largest cinema in Warsaw – "Hollywood". On August 29, 1930, he performed for the first time at the "Nowy Ananas" theatre in Warsaw. On October 6, 1930, he began performing on the stage of the "Morskie Oko" revue theatre. At the same time, he joined the Henryk Wars Choir. In 1931, he played in "Nowy Ananas", then in "Morskie Oko" and "Mignon". From February 1932, he performed at the "Hollywood" cinema, then sang in extras at the "Collosseum" cinema, and from September 1932 to early 1933, he was the artistic director of "Mignon". In October 1933, he played at the "Praskie Oko" revue theatre. In 1934 he managed the "Splendid" cinema, and in 1935 he was the director of revue performances in the "Bagatela" theatre in Łódź. In the spring of 1937 he took part in the Evenings of Humor and Song in the Municipal Theatre in Bydgoszcz and in Gdańsk at the Danziger Hotel. In the seasons of 1937/1938 and 1938/1939 he performed in the "8.15" theatre in Warsaw.

He quickly became a popular singer, a performer of many hits, as well as a valued operetta and revue singer. He collaborated with stages in Poznań, Kalisz, Przemyśl, Radom, Częstochowa, Łódź, Vilnius and Kraków. He appeared in operettas and musical comedies such as Princess Csardas, Dolly, Virtuous Susanna, The Fiancée Was Lost, Baron Kimmel and Miss Water. He starred in the film Queen of the Suburbs (directed by Eugeniusz Bodo.

In the Polish Radio competition organized in 1937 to select the most popular singer, he took third place, after Mieczysław Fogg and Stefan Witas.

In 1937 he appeared in Konrad Tom's film Parada Warszawy, a year later, in Królowa przedmieścia, directed by Eugeniusz Bodo.

In the interwar period he made a great number of recordings, most of them for "Syrena Record". He used several pseudonyms: Jan Saskowski (for his first recordings from 1927), Jerzy Nowogródzki (this pseudonym, used only once, was derived from his place of residence at ul. Nowogrodzka 27); while on "Melodia Electro" records issued from 1935 he used the pseudonym Jan Pobóg (the pseudonym came from the coat of arms of the Faliszewski family). He also recorded for the "Odeon" label and very often for "Lonora Electro" (under his own name and under the pseudonym Jerzy Orowski).

His repertoire included tangos, lyrical and satirical songs, and he also performed operetta arias and songs from revues and films. He was compared to Al Jolson from the film Sonny Boy.

On August 24, 1939, he was mobilized. He took part in the September Campaign. In March 1940, he was arrested and then imprisoned in the Gusen camp, where he sang in the choir and led an artistic group, organizing a stage theater. After liberation, he spent some time in Austria in a DP camp; then he was transferred to the 2nd Army Corps of General Władysław Anders. He served in the 5th Division in Italy as an educational officer and director in the "Wolves" theater.

After World War II, he initially stayed in England, giving singing recitals. Later he went to Italy and then to the USA. He lived in Chicago, performed in programs organized by Feliks Konarski – "Ref-Rena" – in Teatrzyk pod anteną; he made recordings in a record company run by Jan Wojewódka

His wife was the actress Halina Kidawska.
