= Syrena Rekord =

Polish record company

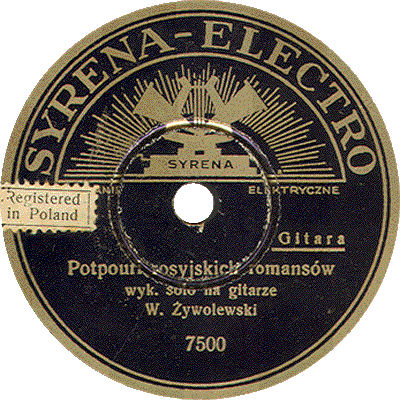
Label of company from 1930 to 193

Syrena Record (also known as Syrena-Rekord and later Syrena-Electro) was the first Polish recording company and one of the most influential phonographic labels in Central and Eastern Europe during the early 20th century. Founded in Warsaw in 1908 by Juliusz Fejgenbaum, the company played a central role in the development of Polish popular music, classical recordings, Jewish musical culture, and early sound film during the interwar period. At its height in the late 1920s and 1930s, Syrena was the dominant recording company in Poland and among the largest in Europe, employing hundreds of workers and exporting records internationally.

== History of Syrena ==
=== Pre-World War I ===
Juliusz Feigenbaum was among the earliest figures involved in introducing sound recording technology to the Polish lands under Russian partition. By the 1890s he was importing and selling Edison phonographs and wax cylinders in Warsaw, helping to establish a market for recorded sound in a region that lacked a domestic phonographic industry. In 1904 he began issuing gramophone discs under the Ideal label, which is generally regarded as the first Polish record label. These early recordings were produced locally and featured Polish-language repertoire, including theatrical monologues, patriotic songs, folk material, and salon music, demonstrating that local recording and pressing could compete with imported products from Western Europe.

In 1908 Feigenbaum reorganized his enterprise under the name Syrena Record, choosing a name derived from the syrenka, the mermaid emblem of Warsaw, as a symbolic assertion of Polish cultural identity. The company’s first pressing plant was located on Piękna Street in Warsaw. From the outset, Syrena distinguished itself by recording local artists rather than relying on imported masters and by issuing recordings in multiple languages that reflected the ethnic and cultural diversity of the region. Its catalog included Polish, Yiddish, Russian, Ukrainian, and Hebrew material, a breadth that was unusual even by European standards.

Syrena expanded rapidly in the years preceding the First World War. In 1909 the company was awarded a Grand Gold Medal at the First Exhibition of Industry and Agriculture in Częstochowa, an important public recognition of the technical quality of its products. Contemporary trade publications compared Syrena’s discs favorably with those of major international firms such as Pathé Frères. In 1911 the company moved into a large, purpose-built factory at 66 Chmielna Street in Warsaw, near the Warsaw–Vienna Railway Station, which enabled efficient distribution throughout the Russian Empire. By 1912 the factory was capable of producing up to 15,000 shellac records per day and employed several hundred workers, making Syrena one of the three largest record manufacturers in Europe at the time.

Before 1914 Syrena conducted extensive mobile recording expeditions across Eastern Europe, including sessions in Warsaw, Łódź, Kraków, Moscow, Saint Petersburg, Kyiv, and Odessa. Recordings were made acoustically using large recording horns, with wax masters transported back to Warsaw for plating and pressing. The company’s repertoire encompassed operetta, cabaret, urban romances, folk music, military marches, Jewish cantorial singing, klezmer ensembles, and popular theatre songs. Its Jewish recordings in particular constituted one of the largest Yiddish-language discographies in Europe, documenting performers, repertories, and performance styles that would later be largely destroyed during the Holocaust.

=== Interwar period ===
The outbreak of the First World War brought Syrena’s rapid growth to an abrupt halt. In 1915 the Russian evacuation of Warsaw forced the suspension of production, and after the German occupation of the city, large quantities of shellac were confiscated for military use. Although the company briefly resumed limited production under occupation, shortages of raw materials made continued operation impossible, and by 1917 record manufacturing had ceased entirely. Some recording equipment was transferred to Moscow, while the Warsaw factory survived largely intact but stood idle for the remainder of the war.

Following the restoration of Polish independence in 1918, Syrena resumed operations in a country devastated by war, inflation, and political instability. One of the company’s earliest postwar releases was Mazurek Dąbrowskiego, the Polish national anthem, which was initially marketed as a folk song due to lingering political uncertainty. During the early 1920s Syrena rebuilt its business through the reissue of prewar recordings, the export of discs to Germany and Austria, and the domestic assembly and sale of gramophones. Label designs from this period were simplified, reflecting both economic constraints and changing aesthetic tastes.

The mid-1920s marked the beginning of Syrena’s interwar golden age. As Polish popular culture flourished, the company became the dominant force in the domestic recording market. In 1928 the composer and arranger Henryk Wars assumed the role of musical director, a position from which he exerted a decisive influence on the sound of Polish popular music. Under his leadership Syrena emphasized professionally arranged recordings, jazz-influenced orchestration, and Polish-language repertoire that blended international dance styles such as tango and foxtrot with local lyrical traditions.

Between 1928 and 1929 Syrena adopted electrical recording technology, replacing acoustic horns with microphones and modern cutting lathes. To mark this transformation, the company rebranded itself as Syrena-Electro. New studios were constructed on Wiśniowa Street in Warsaw, equipped with soundproof rooms and advanced recording equipment modeled on Western European and American systems. In 1929 Syrena became a joint-stock company, with a formal corporate structure that included artistic, technical, and commercial departments. At its peak the enterprise employed several hundred people and issued thousands of recordings annually.

During the 1930s Syrena recorded nearly all major Polish popular performers of the period, including Mieczysław Fogg, Adam Aston, Tadeusz Faliszewski, Eugeniusz Bodo, and Zula Pogorzelska. It also continued to record Jewish artists, such as the celebrated cantor Gershon Sirota and the comedy duo Dzigan and Shumacher, alongside numerous cantorial and klezmer ensembles. The company’s catalog encompassed popular dance music, jazz, Jewish theatre, classical music, spoken-word recordings, comedy, patriotic material, and commercial recordings, making it one of the most comprehensive discographies produced by any European label of the era.

Although Syrena was primarily associated with popular music, it also devoted a significant portion of its output to classical recordings. Its most ambitious project was the complete recording of Stanisław Moniuszko’s opera Halka between 1929 and 1930, released in 1932 as a deluxe multi-disc album. This undertaking represented the first complete opera recording produced in Poland and was regarded as a landmark achievement in the country’s recording history. Syrena’s studios were also closely connected with Polish radio and early sound cinema, contributing music and technical facilities to some of Poland’s first sound films, including Moralność Pani Dulskiej in 1930.

The German invasion of Poland in September 1939 brought Syrena’s existence to an abrupt end. The Syrena Factory was bombed to destruction in September 4, 1939 by the German Luftwaffe and Chairman Hilary Tempel, was shot by the Gestapo in Palmiry in 1940, while musical director Iwo Wesby was sent to the Warsaw Ghetto.

References

- Syrena early history - Juliette Bretan
- Syrena interwar history - Juliette Bretan
- Tomasz Lerski (2004). Syrena Record - pierwsza polska wytwórnia fonograficzna - Poland's first recording company - 1904-1939. New York, Warszawa: Karin. ISBN 978-83-917189-0-2.
