= List of Polish films before 1930 =

List of films produced in the Cinema of Poland before 1930.

Title	Director	Cast	Genre	Notes
1902
Powrót Birbanta	Kazimierz Prószyński	Kazimierz Junosza-Stępowski		
Przygoda dorożkarza	Kazimierz Prószyński			
1908
Antoś pierwszy raz w Warszawie	Jerzy Meyer			
Pruska kultura				
1911
Antek klawisz, bohater Powiśla	Józef Ostoja-Sulnicki			
Chasydka i odstępca	Andrzej Marek			
Dzieje grzechu	Antoni Bednarczyk			
Dzień kwiatka	Julian Krzewiński			
Kosz primadonny	Julian Krzewiński			
Macocha				
Meir Ezofowicz	Józef Ostoja-Sulnicki			
Okrutny ojciec	Andrzej Marek			
Sąd Boży	Stanisław Knake-Zawadzki			
Skandal na ulicy Szopena				
Zabójca z nędzy	Abraham Izaak Kamiński			
Zazdrosny konkurent				
1912
Bóg, człowiek i szatan	Abraham Izaak Kamiński			
Krwawa dola	Władysław Paliński			
Miłosne przygody panów Z. i J., znanych osobistości w D.				
Mirełe Efros	Andrzej Marek			
Niebezpieczny kochanek	Kazimierz Kamiński			
Obłąkany				
Ofiara namiętności	Władysław Paliński			
Pietro Caruso	Kazimierz Kamiński			
Pomszczona krzywda				
Przesądy	Józef Ostoja-Sulnicki			
Spodnie jaśnie pana	Aleksander Hertz			
Wojewoda				
Wydziedziczeni	Abraham Izaak Kamiński			
1913
Antek kombinator				
Bigamistka	H. Fiszer			
Córka kantora	H. Fiszer			
Dramat Wieży Mariackiej	Wiktor Biegański			
Fatalna klątwa	H. Fiszer			
Grzech	Stanisław Sebel			
Halka	Stanisław Sebel			
Kara Boża	H. Fiszer			
Kościuszko pod Racławicami	Orland			
Najmilszy ze złodziei	Zygmunt Wesołowski			
Nieznajomy	H. Fiszer			
Obrona Częstochowy	Edward Puchalski			
Przygody pana Antoniego	Wiktor Biegański			
Ubój	H. Fiszer			
Wykolejeni	Kazimierz Kamiński			
Zemsta spoza grobu				
1914
Ach, te spodnie!	Edward Puchalski			
Bóg wojny				
Fatalna godzina	Stanisław Sebel			
Macocha	Abraham Izaak Kamiński			
Męty z Warszawy				
Slave of the Senses	Jan Pawlowski	Pola Negri, Wojciech Brydzinski	Drama	
Słodycz grzechu	Edward Puchalski			
Tajemnica pokoju nr 100	Stanisław Sebel			
Wróg tanga	Seweryn Majde			
1915
Karpaccy górale				
Skandal w eleganckim świecie				
Szpieg	Aleksander Hertz			
Wyklęta córka	Abraham Izaak Kamiński			
Zaczarowane koło	Witalis Korsak-Gołogowski			
Żona	Jan Pawłowski			
1916
Chcemy męża				
Małżeństwo na rozdrożu				
Ochrana warszawska i jej tajemnice				
Pod jarzmem tyranów	Franz Porten	Franciszek Frączkowski, Marian Jednowski, Stanisław Polański, Helena Zahorska, Bolesław Brzeski, Stanisław Dąbrowski, Zygmunt Noskowski, Irena Regicz, Wanda Jarszewska, Bolesław Mierzejewski		
Studenci		Kazimierz Junosza-Stępowski, Władysław Grabowski, Mia Mara, Rafaela Bończa, Pola Negri, Józef Węgrzyn, Halina Bruczówna		
Wściekły rywal		Mia Mara, Józef Węgrzyn, Julian Krzewiński, Wanda Szymborska, Stanisław Jarniński		
1917
Bestia		Pola Negri, Maria Dulęba, Witold Kuncewicz, Jan Pawłowski, Mia Mara		
Carat i jego sługi		Kazimierz Junosza-Stępowski, Halina Bruczówna, Józef Węgrzyn, Paweł Owerłło, Alekandra Dobrzańska, Anna Belina, Józef Grodnicki, P. Śnieżko, Emilia Różańska, Józef Zejdowski, Henryk Małkowski		
Jego ostatni czyn		Pola Negri, Józef Węgrzyn, Kazimierz Junosza-Stępowski, Halina Bruczówna, Paweł Owerłło		
Kobieta				
Arabella		Pola Negri, Józef Węgrzyn, Władysław Grabowski, Jan Pawłowski, Antoni Bednarczyk		
Pokój nr 13		Kazimierz Junosza-Stępowski, Pola Negri, Jan Pawłowski, Rafaela Bończa, Andrzej Bogucki, Emilia Różańska, Iza Kozłowska, Helena Arkawin		
Tajemnica Alei Ujazdowskich		Pola Negri, Rafaela Bończa, Helena Arkawin, Iza Kozłowska, Kazimierz Junosza-Stępowski, Jan Pawłowski, Andrzej Bogucki		
Topiel	Władysław Lenczewski			
1918
Carska faworyta	Władysław Lenczewski			
Książę Józef Poniatowski	Aleksander Hertz			
Melodie duszy				
Mężczyzna	Aleksander Hertz			
Rozporek i ska	Konrad Tom			
Sezonowa miłość	Władysław Lenczewski			
Złote bagno	Władysław Lenczewski			
1919
Blanc et noir	Eugeniusz Modzelewski			
Carewicz	Marian Fuchs			
Dla szczęścia	Aleksander Hertz			
Droga do upadku czyli w nawiasach życia				
Kobieta, która widziała śmierć	Władysław Lenczewski			
Krysta	Aleksander Hertz, Danny Kaden			
Lokaj	Eugeniusz Modzelewski			
Panna po wojnie	Władysław Lenczewski			
Przestępcy	Eugeniusz Modzelewski			
Tamara	Nina Niovilla			
1920
The Jews in Poland				
Bohaterstwo polskiego skauta	Ryszard Bolesławski			
Córka pani X	Ryszard Bolesławski			
Czaty	Nina Niovilla			
Dla ciebie, Polsko	Antoni Bednarczyk			
Konsul Pomeranc	Konrad Tom			
Krwawy terror				
Nie damy ziemi skąd nasz ród	Władysław Lenczewski			
Powrót	Aleksander Hertz			
1921
Cud nad Wisłą	Ryszard Bolesławski			
Ludzie bez jutra	Aleksander Hertz			
Dwie urny	Cezar Rino-Lupo			
Idziem do Ciebie, Polsko, matko nasza	Nina Niovilla			
Janko Zwycięzca	Gustaw Cybulski			
Krzyk				
Pan Twardowski	Wiktor Biegański		Fantasy, Horror	
Uroda zycia	Eugeniusz Modzelewski and William Wauer			
1922
Chłopi				
Otchlan pokuty	Wiktor Biegański			
Strzal				
Tajemnica przystanku tramwajowego	Leon Trystan			
Zazdrosc	Wiktor Biegański			
1923
Awantury miłosne panny D.	Tadeusz Chrzanowski			
Bozyszcze	Wiktor Biegański			
Kule, które nie trafiają	Tadeusz Chrzanowski			
Niewolnica milosci	Jan Kucharski, Stanislaw Szebego and Adam Zagórski			
Syn szatana	Bruno Bredschneider	Anastazy Nawrocki, Stanislaw Jarocki, Wladyslaw Jaminski	Horror, Drama	
1924
Atakualpa	Henryk Bigoszt, Ignacy Miastecki		Horror, Romance	
Śmierć za życie. Symfonia ludzkości	Jan Kucharski			
(Tkies khaf) Ślubowanie	Zygmund Turkow			Yiddish language
1925
Iwonka	Emil Chaberski			
Rivals	Henryk Szaro	Elna Gistedt, Antoni Fertner, Eugeniusz Bodo	Comedy	
1926
Czerwony blazen				
O czym się nie myśli				
Tredowata	Boleslaw Mierzejewski and Edvard Pukhalsky			
1927
Bunt krwi i zelaza	Leon Trystan			
The Call of the Sea	Henryk Szaro	Maria Malicka, Jerzy Marr, Nora Ney	Romance	
Kochanka Szamoty	Leon Trystan		Drama, Horror	
Orle	Wiktor Biegański			
Ziemia obiecana	Zygmund Turkow and Aleksander Hertz			
1928
The Final Touch	Juliusz Gardan	Stefan Szwarc, Tadeusz Fijewski, Ludwik Fritsche	Drama	
Huragan	Joseph Lejtes			
Liebeshölle	Wiktor Biegański			
Pan Tadeusz	Ryszard Ordynski			
Przedwiosnie	Henryk Szaro			
Szalency	Leonard Buczkowski			
The Wild Girl	Henryk Szaro	Maria Malicka, Zbigniew Sawan, Aleksander Zabczynski	Romance	
1929
Grzeszna miłość	Mieczysław Krawicz, Zbigniew Gniazdowski			
Kult ciała	Michał Waszyński	Victor Varconi, Agnes Petersen-Mozzuchinowa, Fryderyk Delius, Krystyna Ankwicz, Eugeniusz Bodo	Romantic comedy	
Mocny czlowiek	Henryk Szaro			
Nad Radem	Aleksander Ford			
Pod banderą miłości				
Police Chief Tagiejew	Juliusz Gardan	Boguslaw Samborski, Zbigniew Sawan, Maria Bogda	Drama	
Tajemnica skrzynki pocztowej				
W lasach polskich				
