= Marta Flantz =

Polish actress and director (1885-1938)

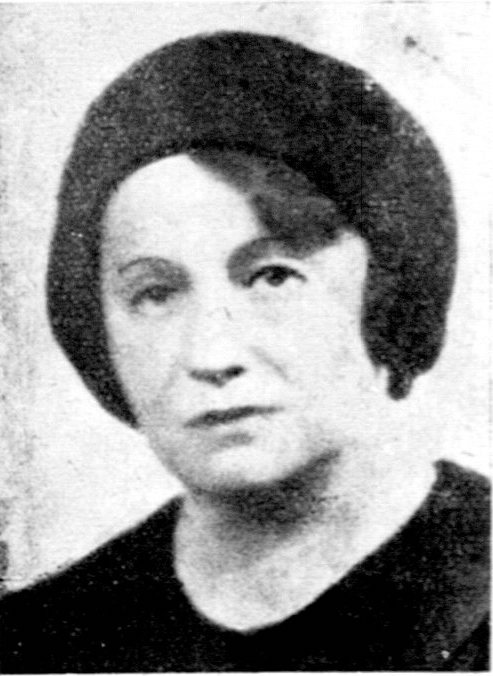
- Marta Flantz, 1934
- Born: 1885
- Died: 1938 (aged 52–53)
- Occupations: Actress, director

Marta Flantz, also spelled Flanz (1885 – 1938) was a Polish German-speaking actress and film director. She was among the first women in Poland to direct a feature film.

== Biography ==
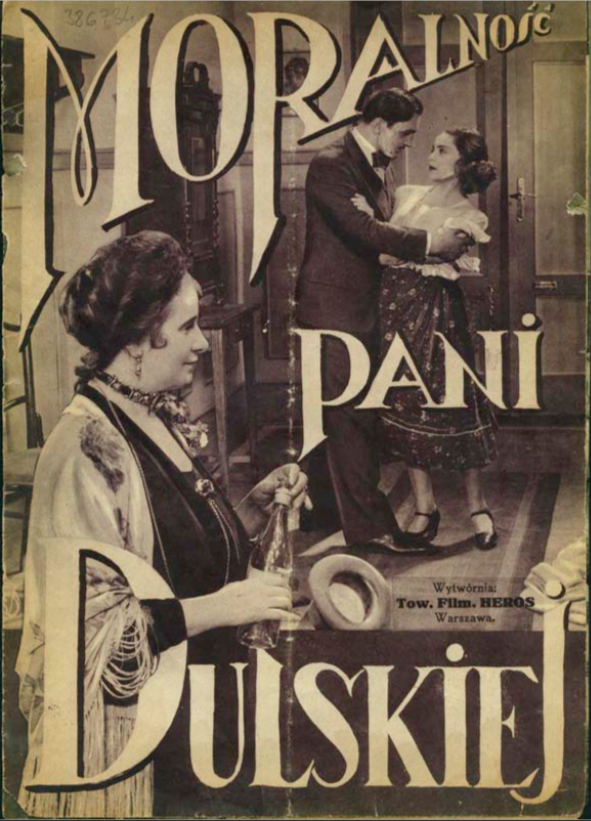
Cover of a leaflet promoting The Morality of Mrs. Dulska with Flantz at the fore

Marta Flantz was born in 1885. She studied acting in Vienna with Max Reinhardt; she acted in German. Flantz was married to the film director Bolesław Land. Together with Nina Niovilla, Stanisława Perzanowska (co-director of Jego wielka miłość; 1936) and Wanda Jakubowska, she was one of four women who directed full-length feature films in the interwar Poland.

In 1929, Flantz played the title role in The Morality of Mrs. Dulska (1930) – the first Polish sound film, an adaptation of Gabriela Zapolska's play with the same title. Flantz was also a co-director of the sound scenes. Because she played in German, her role was dubbed. Her acting received favorable reviews.

In the 1930s, Flantz joined the Leo-Film production company ran by Maria Hirszbein. Flantz, together with Bolesław Land, wrote the screenplay for Prokurator Alicja Horn (1933), based on the novel by Tadeusz Dołęga-Mostowicz. Flantz also directed the film together with Michał Waszyński. Two years later, she was the sole director of the romantic comedy Kochaj tylko mnie produced by Leo-Film. The main roles were played by: the debutante Lidia Wysocka, Kazimierz Junosza-Stępowski, Michał Znicz, Witold Zacharewicz and Helena Grossówna. The film followed love affairs of a theater star.

Flantz died in 1938.

== Works ==
- 1929: Police Chief Tagiejew – the role of Ciotunia
- 1930: The Morality of Mrs. Dulska – the role of Aniela Dulska, direction of sound scenes
- 1931: Uwiedziona – the role of Madame
- 1933: Prokurator Alicja Horn – screenplay and direction
- 1935: Kochaj tylko mnie – direction
