= Winawer =

Winawer is a surname. Notable people with the surname include:

- Szymon Winawer (1838–1919), Polish chess player
- Bruno Winawer (1883–1944), Polish columnist, comedy writer, and physicist
- Melodie Winawer, American neurologist

== See also ==
- Vinaver
