= Lech Owron =

Polish actor (1893–1965)

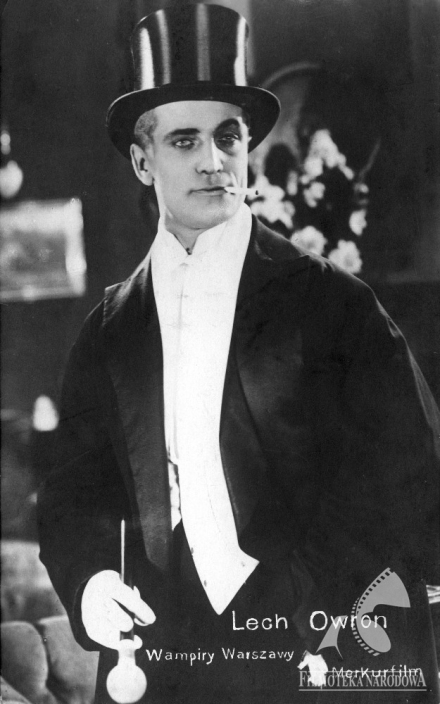
- Born: 6 July 1893; Radom, Congress Poland, Russian Empire
- Died: 9 June 1965 (aged 71); Katowice, Poland
- Other name: Lech Owron-Przyłuski
- Occupation: Actor
- Years active: 1925–1960

Lech Owron (6 July 1893 – 9 June 1965) was a Polish stage and film actor whose career began in the 1920s during the silent film era.

== Early life ==
Born in Radom, Lech Owron graduated from the Edward Rontaler Gymnasium in Warsaw, he then studied mining engineering in Mons, Belgium. During the outbreak of World War I, he was in Russia and returned to Poland in 1919 where he became the director of the newly formed Quid Pro Quo Theater in Warsaw. He also worked as bank clerk in the early 1920s.

== Acting career ==
Owron began his career in film with the role of the villainous Baron Kamiłow in the Wiktor Biegański directed 1925 crime drama Vampires of Warsaw. The film was a financial and critical success in Poland. However, Owron soon found himself typecast within the film industry and for a number of years many of his film roles were that of villains and scoundrels.

He worked steadily through the late 1920s and early 1930s in film, but soon found himself discouraged by the roles he was receiving. One of his more successful roles of the era was the 1926 Biegański directed comedy drama Orlę (English release title: The Little Eagle), in which he played the role of the brigand Janosik; a Robin Hood-like character of the Tatra Mountains.

Following a small role in the 1933 Mieczysław Krawicz directed drama Szpieg w masce (English release title: Spy), he temporarily retired from film and began to concentrate on roles on the stage. He returned to the screen in two films in 1937 before once again retiring.

Following the end of World War II, Owron returned to the stage sporadically with various theater engagements. He made one final film in 1960, Krzyżacy (Knights of the Teutonic Order), directed by Aleksander Ford before permanently retiring from acting altogether. He died in Katowice in 1965.

== Filmography ==
Year	Title	Role	Notes
1925	Vampires of Warsaw	Baron Kamiłow	
1926	Czerwony błazen	Prosecutor Gliński	
1927	Orlę	Janosik	
1927	Bunt krwi i żelaza	Journalist Ryszard Wertczyński	
1928	Ludzie dzisiejsi	Herbutt, manager	
1928	Romans panny Opolskiej		
1929	9:25. Przygoda jednej nocy		
1929	Mocny człowiek	Actor	
1929	Z dnia na dzień	Sędzia Wojskowy	
1929	Szlakiem hańby	Artur Klug	
1930	Dusze w niewoli	Witold Kaniewski	
1930	Niebezpieczny romans	A Detective	
1931	Cham	Chauffeur	
1932	Szyb L-23		
1932	Rok 1914		
1932	Rycerze mroku		
1933	Ostatnia eskapada		
1933	Szpieg w masce	Man talking to Skalski	
1937	O czym marzą kobiety	Croupier	
1937	Pan redaktor szaleje		
1937	Dorożkarz nr 13	Croupier	
1960	Knights of the Teutonic Order	Castle Commander	(final film role)
