= Vampires of Warsaw =

1925 Polish film directed by Wiktor Biegański

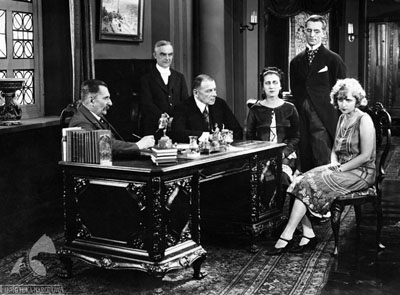
- A scene from the film.
- Directed by: Wiktor Biegański
- Written by: Wiktor Biegański (based on his own stage play)
- Starring: Oktawian Kaczanowski; Halina Labedzka; Maria Balcerkiewiczówna; Igo Sym
- Cinematography: Ferdynand Vlassak; Antoni Wawrzyniak
- Production company: Merkurfilm
- Release date: 28 October 1925
- Running time: 36 minutes
- Country: Poland
- Languages: Silent; Polish intertitles

Vampires of Warsaw (Polish: Wampiry Warszawy) is a 1925 Polish silent crime film directed by Wiktor Biegański and starring Oktawian Kaczanowski, Halina Labedzka and Maria Balcerkiewiczówna. It was Biegański's most popular film, and displayed the influence of Soviet cinema on his work. The film is considered lost, so it is difficult to describe the plot in detail, but from what can be gathered the film appears to have been a murder mystery whodunit featuring a pair of Russian aristocrats who are determined to marry a wealthy father/daughter and murder them for their inheritance. Despite the title the film did not actually feature any vampires of the supernatural variety.

Actor Igo Sym, who later shared billing in films with top name stars like Marlene Dietrich, became a Nazi informant in WWII and turned in a number of fellow Polish actors and theater owners who were aligned with the Resistance forces in Poland. In 1941, some Polish freedom fighters assassinated Sym, and the Nazis retaliated by executing 21 hostages and sending dozens of others to Auschwitz.

== Cast ==
- Oktawian Kaczanowski as Pradowski
- Halina Łabędzka as Urszula Pradowska
- Maria Balcerkiewiczówna as Countess Tamarska
- Igo Sym as Tadeusz Wyzewicz, lawyer
- Lech Owron as Baron Kamiłow
- Marian Kiernicki as Antoni, lokaj
- Wiera Pogorzanka as Tonia
- Katarzyna Dworkowska as Przelozona klasztoru
- Piotr Hryniewicz as Prosecutor
- K. Marczewski as Lichwiarz

== Bibliography ==
- Haltof, Marek. Polish National Cinema. Berghahn Books, 2002.
