= Countess Walewska =

Countess Walewska may refer to:

- Marie Walewska, Polish noblewoman
- Countess Walewska (1914 film), a Polish historical film
- Countess Walewska (1920 film), a German silent historical film
