= The Morality of Mrs. Dulska (film) =

1930 Polish film

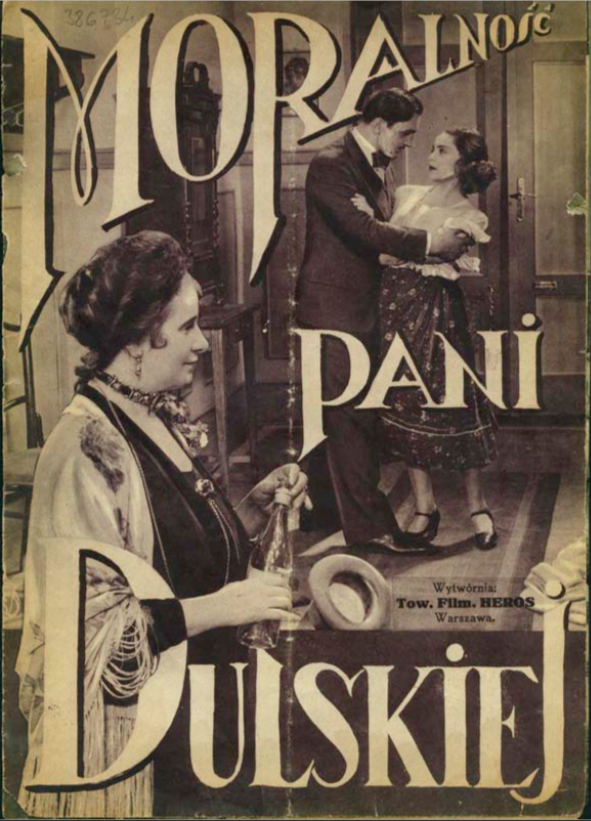
- Moralność pani Dulskiej
- Directed by: Bolesław Newolin
- Screenplay by: Bolesław Newolin; Bolesław Land
- Based on: Play "The Morality of Mrs. Dulska" by Gabriela Zapolska
- Starring: Dela Lipińska; Marta Flantz; Ludwik Fritsche; Tadeusz Wesołowski; Anna Daszyńska
- Cinematography: Giovanni Vitrotti
- Music by: Ludomir Różycki
- Release date: 1930
- Running time: 105 min
- Country: Poland
- Language: Polish

The Morality of Mrs. Dulska (Polish: Moralność pani Dulskiej) is a 1930 Polish film, directed by Bolesław Newolin based on Gabriela Zapolska's play of the same name. It was the first Polish sound film. The dialogues were recorded on vinyl records that were lost, so the film is currently silent.

== Plot ==
The action of the film takes place in Warsaw (not in Lviv like in the original play) at the beginning of the 20th century. The Dulski family welcomes a new servant - Hanka. The girl falls in love with their son Zbyszek. The young people have an affair which results in an illegitimate child. Zbyszek wants to marry the girl but meets the resistance of his parents.

== Cast ==
- Dela Lipińska (Hanka)
- Marta Flantz (Aniela Dulska)
- Ludwik Fritsche (Felicjan Dulski)
- Tadeusz Wesołowski (Dulski Zbyszko)
- Juliusz Lubicz-Lisowski (Antek)
- Maria Chaveau (Juliasiewiczowa)
- Anna Daszyńska (Mela)
- Zofia Batycka (actress)
- Adolf Dymsza (constable)
- Roman Dereń (watchman)
- Helena Sokołowska (Zofia Madrygał, fiancée's mother)
- Janina Modzelewska (Tadrachowa)
- Stanisława Kamińska (Marysia)
- Jan Szymański (Tadrach, old villager)
- Krystyna Ankwicz
