= Maria Balcerkiewiczówna =

Polish actress (1903–1975)

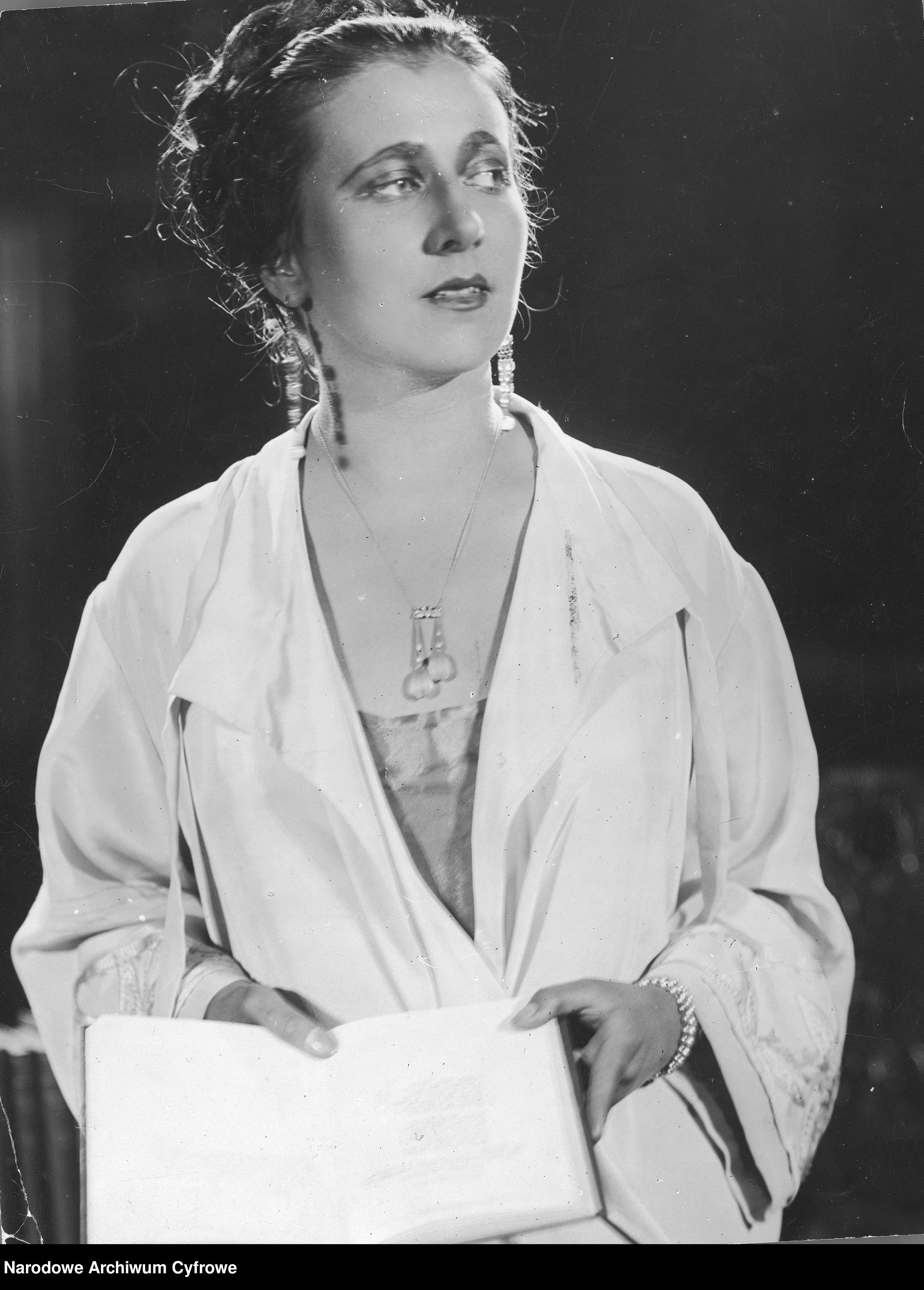
- Maria Balcerkiewiczówna in 1926
- Born: Maria Wanda Balcerkiewiczówna; 21 December 1903; Warsaw, Poland
- Died: 11 February 1975 (aged 71); London, United Kingdom of Great Britain and Northern Ireland
- Other name: Maria Balzerkiewicz
- Occupation: Actor
- Years active: 1922–1936

Maria Wanda Balcerkiewiczówna (21 December 1903 – 11 February 1975) was a Polish stage and film actress of the early 20th century.

Born in Warsaw, she graduated from the C. Rino-Lupo film school in 1921, followed by a year of private acting lessons under the tutelage of Aleksander Zelwerowicz before making her stage debut on the theater stages of Warsaw in 1922, including stints at the National Theatre, Warsaw and the Grand Theatre, Warsaw. She made her film debut in the 1924 Edward Puchalski-directed O czym sie nie mówi, starring Jadwiga Smosarska.

From 1929 to 1931 she led her own acting troupe through the Polish provinces, bringing theater to small towns and villages, where she would also recite poetry. During World War II, Balcerkiewiczówna fled to London where she would settle permanently and became a member of the Association of Polish Stage Artists (ZASP) while in exile. Proficient in nine languages, she spent her later years working as a translator. She died in London in 1975.

== Filmography ==
Year	Title	Role	Notes
1924	The Unspeakable	Unspeakable	
1925	Vampires of Warsaw	Countess Tamarska	
1926	Tredowata	Melania Barska	
1927	Usmiech losu	Losnicka, cabaret actress	
1928	Ludzie dzisiejsi	Teacher	
1934	Zamarle echo	Ewa	
1934	Młody Las	Jakubowska	
1935	Her Highness Dances the Waltz	Countess Lubowska	
1936	Augustus the Strong	Princess Jablonowska	
1936	Valse éternelle	Countess Labowiska	(final film role)
