= Love Only Me =

1935 Polish film

- Directed by: Marta Flantz
- Written by: Karol Jarossy, Adolf Lantz (screenplay), Emanuel Schlechter (dialogue)
- Starring: Lidia Wysocka, Kazimierz Junosza-Stępowski, Witold Zacharewicz, Helena Grossówna
- Cinematography: Henryk Vlassak
- Music by: Władysław Eiger, Emanuel Schlechter
- Release date: 12 December 1935
- Running time: 84 minutes
- Country: Poland
- Language: Polish

Love Only Me (Polish: Kochaj tylko mnie) is a 1935 Polish romantic comedy film directed by Marta Flantz.

== Cast ==
- Lidia Wysocka – Lidia Relska / Hanka, Żarski's daughter
- Kazimierz Junosza-Stępowski – Żarski
- Witold Zacharewicz – Stefan Guzecki
- Helena Grossówna – Lulu Bilska
- Michał Znicz – revue manager
- Władysław Grabowski – baron Hipolit Karcz
- Barbara Gilewska – Relska's dresser
- Stanisław Sielański – Piętek, secretary
- Emanuel Schlechter – author
- Józef Kondrat – messenger
- Zbigniew Rakowiecki – dancer
