= The Abyss of Repentance =

1923 film

- Directed by: Wiktor Biegański
- Written by: Wiktor Biegański
- Starring: Antoni Piekarski; Ryszard Sobiszewski; Halina Maciejowska; Jerzy Starczewski
- Cinematography: Zbigniew Gniazdowski; Stanisław Sebel
- Production company: Kinostudia
- Release date: 7 January 1923
- Country: Poland
- Languages: Silent; Polish intertitles

The Abyss of Repentance (Polish: Otchłań pokuty) is a 1923 Polish silent drama film directed by Wiktor Biegański and starring Antoni Piekarski, Ryszard Sobiszewski and Halina Maciejowska. The film was shot and set in the Tatra Mountains.

== Cast ==
- Antoni Piekarski as Lesniczy
- Ryszard Sobiszewski as Molski, father
- Halina Maciejowska as Maria 'Mary' Molska
- Wiktor Biegański as Ryszard 'Rysio' Molski, Mary's brother
- Jerzy Starczewski as Narzeczony Marii

== Bibliography ==
- Haltof, Marek. Polish National Cinema. Berghahn Books, 2002.
