= Zofia Jaroszewska =

Polish actress (1902–1985)

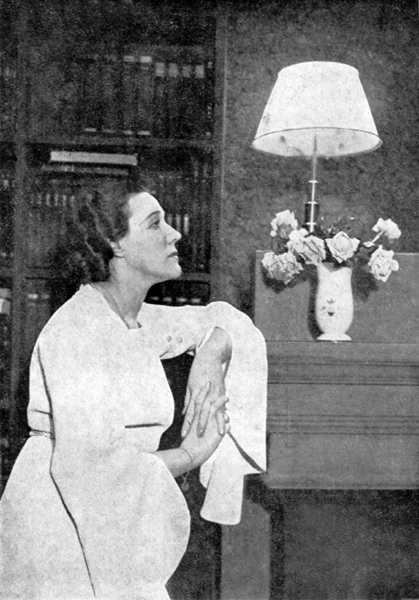
- Born: 25 September 1902; Irbit, Irbitsky Uyezd, Perm Governorate, Russian Empire (now Sverdlovsk Oblast, Russia)
- Died: 25 September 1985 (aged 83); Kraków, Poland
- Occupation: Actress
- Years active: 1922-1983

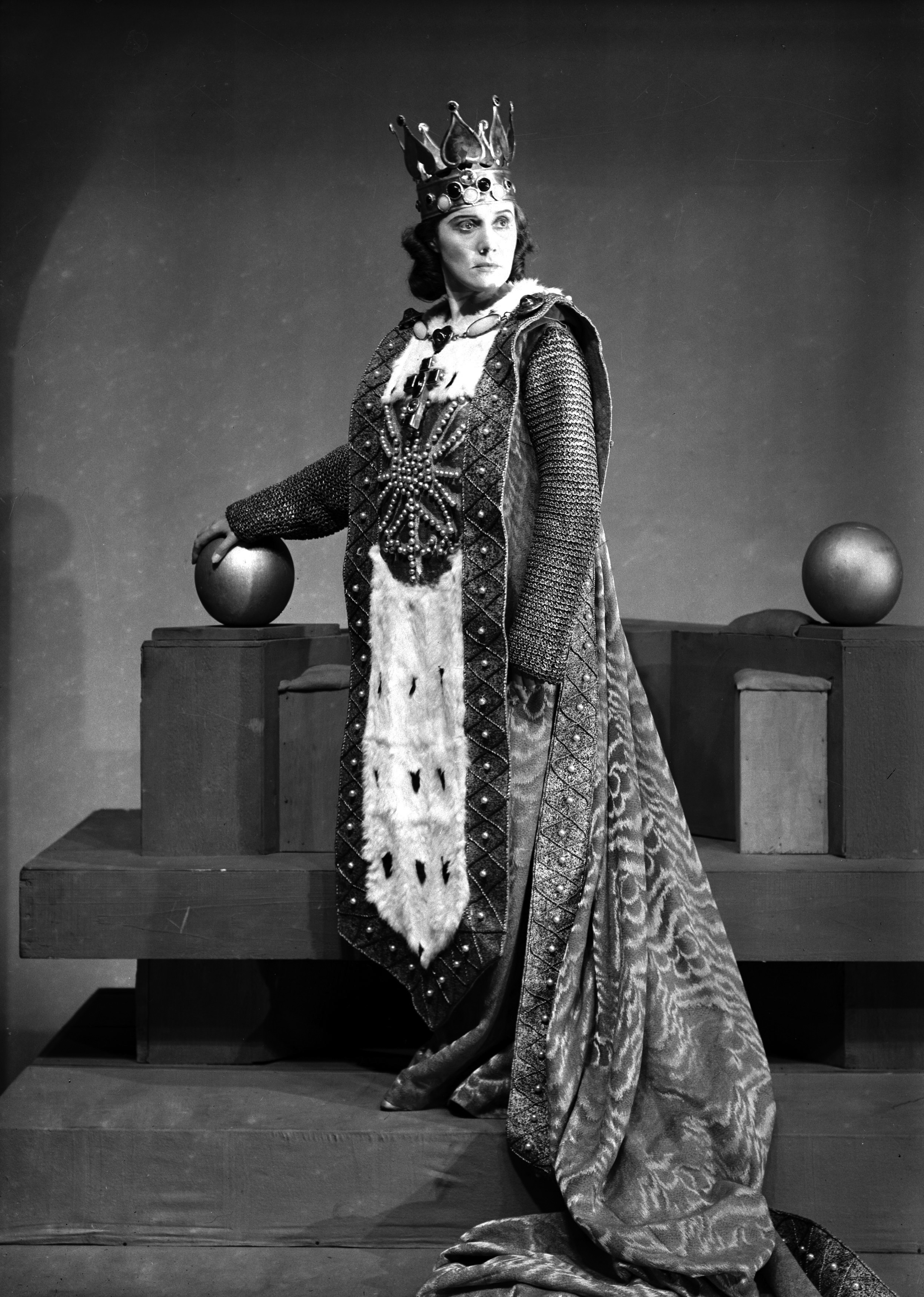
Zofia Jaroszewska in the role of Balladyna, 1938

Zofia Jaroszewska (25 September 1902 – 25 September 1985) was a Polish film and theatre actress.

== Biography ==
Her remainings were buried at the Salwator Cemetery.

== Selected filmography ==
- Jealousy (1922)
- Dvanáct křesel (1933)
- The Doll (1977; TV series) as Mrs Zasławska
- The Maids of Wilko (1979) as Wiktor's aunt

== Awards ==
- Officer's Cross of the Order of Polonia Restituta (22 July 1952)
- Medal of the 10th Anniversary of People's Poland (28 January 1955)
- Order of the Banner of Labour, first class (1969)
