= Uwiedziona =

1931 film

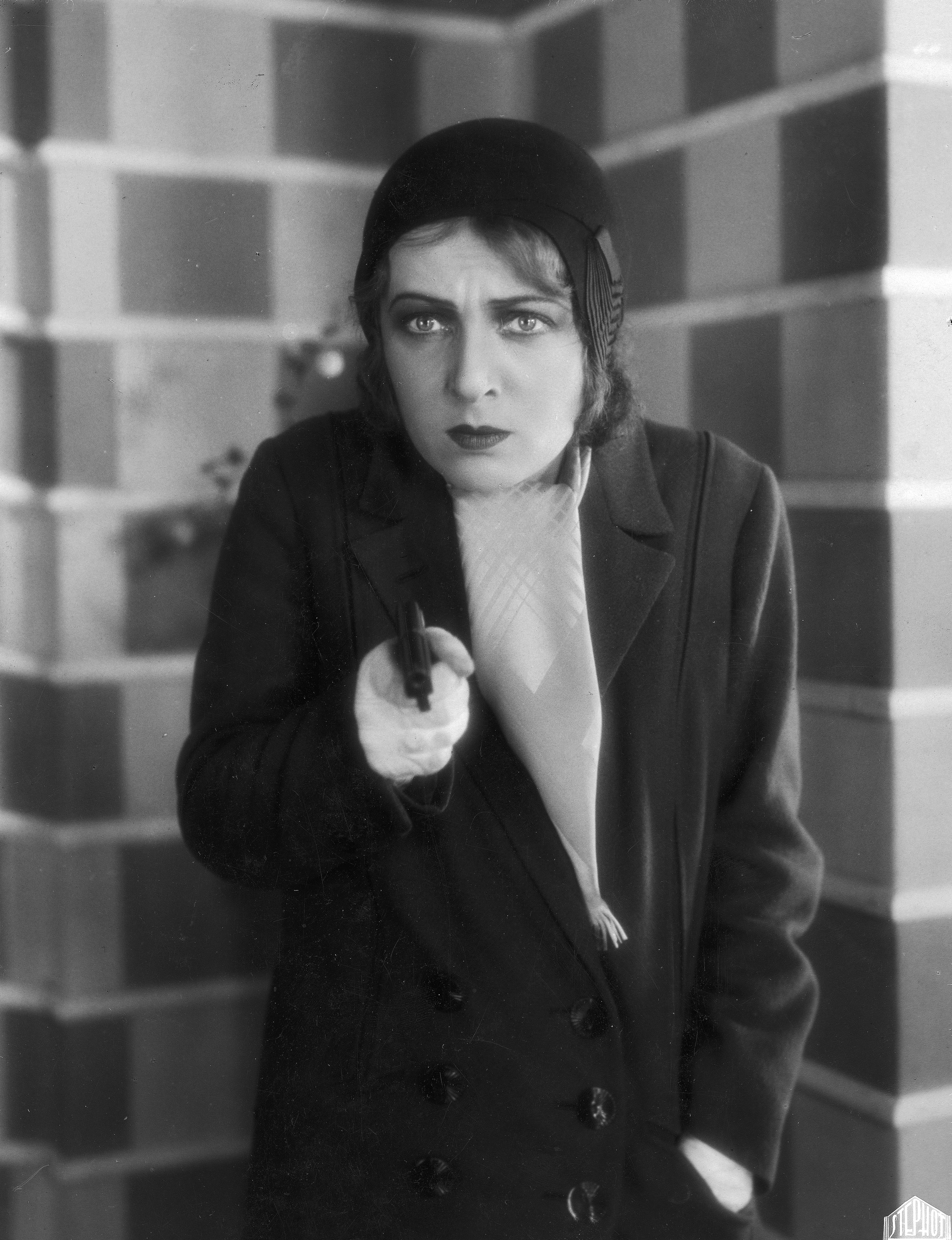
- Uwiedziona - Actress Maria Malicka (1900-1992)
- Directed by: Michał Waszyński
- Written by: Leo Belmont, Jerzy Kossowski
- Release date: 7 March 1931
- Country: Poland
- Language: Polish

Uwiedziona is a 1931 Polish film directed by Michał Waszyński.

== Cast ==
- Maria Malicka ... Lena
- Kazimierz Junosza-Stępowski ... Rawicz
- Krystyna Ankwicz ... Maria Rawicza
- Zbigniew Sawan ... Jerzy Rawicz
- Tadeusz Olsza ... Gustav von Wollendorf
- Irena Dalma ... Young Girl
- Eliza Fischer ... Young Girl
- Marta Flantz ... Madame
- Michal Halicz ... Cousin
- Oktawian Kaczanowski
- Jan Kochanowicz ... Defense Attorney
- Leon Rechenski ... Presiding Judge
- Jan Rogozinski
- Stanisław Sielański ... Guest
- Czesław Skonieczny ... Tailor
- Zofia Slaska
- Tadeusz Wesolowski ... Jerzy's Friend
- Janusz Ziejewski... Jerzy's Friend
- Zbigniew Ziembinski... Journalist
