= Ludzie bez jutra =

1921 film

- Poster for the film
- Directed by: Aleksander Hertz
- Written by: Stanislaw Jerzy Kozlowski
- Starring: Józef Węgrzyn; Halina Bruczówna; Pavel Owerlio; Iza Kozlowska
- Production company: Sfinks
- Release date: 1921
- Country: Poland
- Language: Silent (Polish intertitles)

Ludzie bez jutra (English: People with no Tomorrow, it was also shown under several English titles, among them At the Time of the Czars and The Bartenieff Affair) is a 1921 Polish silent film by director Aleksander Hertz. The film was considered lost for almost a hundred years before being rediscovered in Germany in 2015.

Ludzie bez jutra (1919)

== Production ==
The film has been considered to be among several films made in the 1910 and 1920s which were playing off of anti-Russian feelings in Poland during that time. The film was the last film made by director Aleksander Hertz before Polish independence from Russia.

== Plot ==
The film is based on the real life ill-starred love affair between Polish actress Maria Wisnowska and Russian cavalry officer Alexander Bartenev. The affair led to Bartenev eventually killing Wisnowska as part of a suicide pact.

== Reception ==
The film was met with negative reactions upon its release, it became controversial with both government censors and general audiences for portraying the events of the murder realistically. The controversy brought the studio Sfinks into a public scandal.

== See also ==
- Cinema of Poland
- List of rediscovered films
- List of Polish films before 1930
