= The Idol (1923 film) =

1923 film

- Directed by: Wiktor Biegański
- Written by: Gustaw Kamienski
- Produced by: Józef Szwajcer
- Starring: Ryszard Sobiszewski; Norbert Wicki; Antoni Piekarski; Maria Lubowiecka
- Cinematography: Stanislaw Sebel
- Production company: Polfilma
- Release date: 18 May 1923
- Country: Poland
- Languages: Silent; Polish intertitles

The Idol (Polish:Bożyszcze) is a 1923 Polish silent drama film directed by Wiktor Biegański and starring Ryszard Sobiszewski, Norbert Wicki and Antoni Piekarski. The film was shot and set in the Tatra Mountains.

== Cast ==
- Ryszard Sobiszewski as Jan Zadroga, painter
- Norbert Wicki as Wolski, sculptor
- Antoni Piekarski as Wezyk
- Maria Lubowiecka as Stasia Wezykówna
- Jerzy Starczewski as Jan Zadroga, young
- Leon Trystan as Wolski, young

== Bibliography ==
- Haltof, Marek. Polish National Cinema. Berghahn Books, 2002.
