= Mieczysław Srokowski =

Polish writer and poet

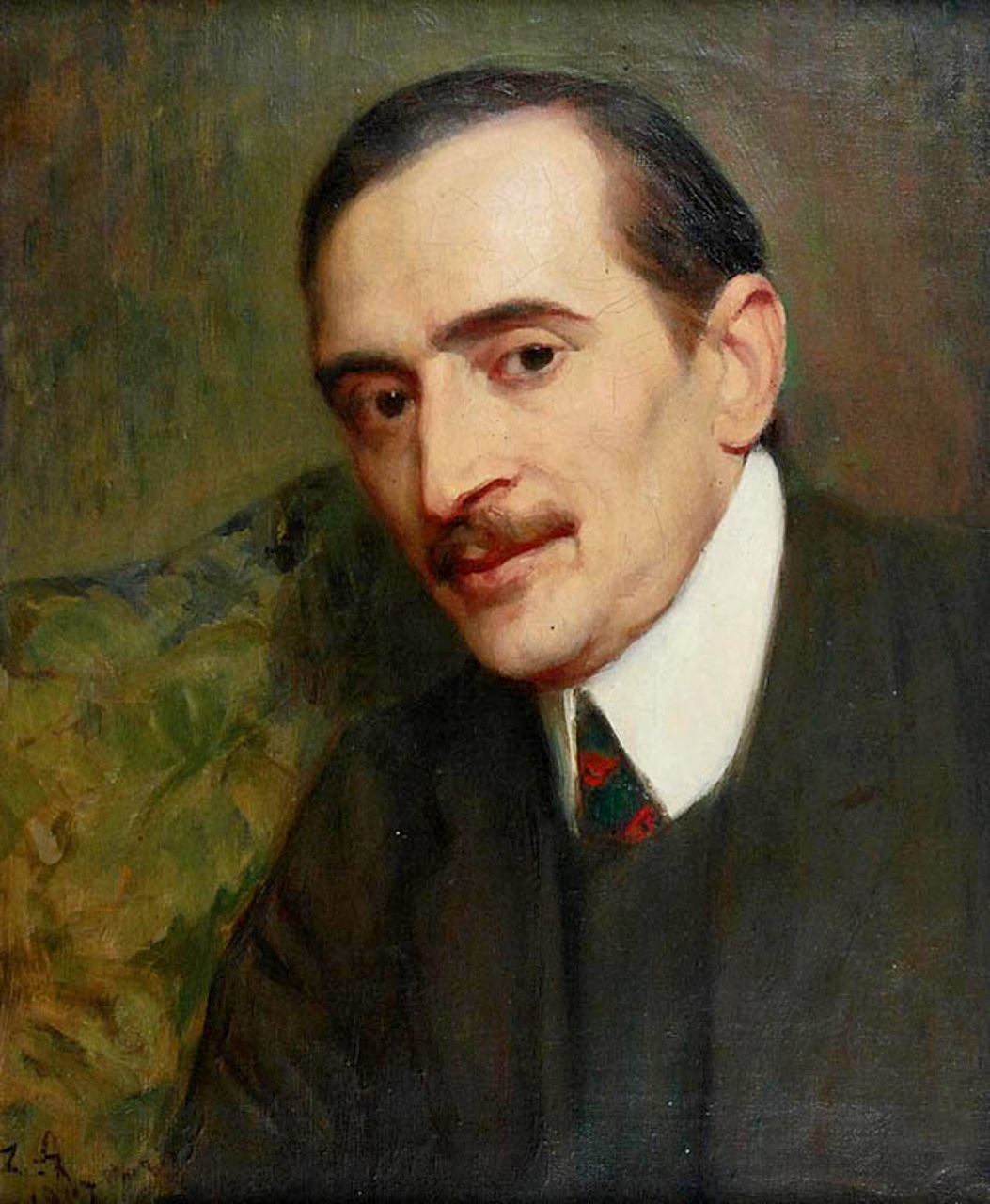
Zygmunt Andrychiewicz: Portrait of Mieczysław Srokowski

Mieczysław Srokowski (14 August 1873 in the village of Bybło, Podole – 11 September 1910 in Warsaw) was a Polish writer and poet. His 1910 novel, Kult ciała, Dziennik człowieka samotnego was adapted in the film Kult ciała in 1930 and starred Victor Varconi.

== Selected works ==
- Chore sny (1899)
- Epigoni (1904)
- Krew (1906)
- Ich Tajemnica (1908)
- Kult ciała, Dziennik człowieka samotnego (1910)
- Anachroniści (1910)
- Jak łza (1910)
- Jus primae noctis (nieukończona) (1910)
