= Ewa Mazierska =

Polish academic

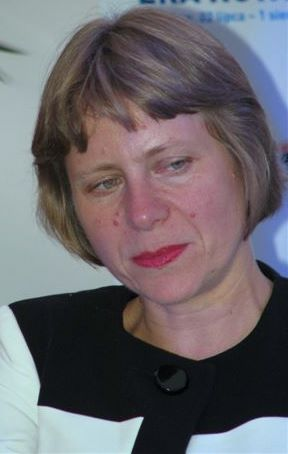
- Ewa Mazierska: Wrocław (Poland), July 25, 2010
- Born: 1964 (age 60–61); Włocławek, Polish People's Republic
- Occupation: Film critic

Ewa Mazierska (born 1964) is a film critic and reader in contemporary cinema in the Department of Humanities of the University of Central Lancashire. Her publications include various articles in Polish and English and a number of monographs. She also co-edited Relocating Britishness (co-authors: John Walton, Susan Sydney-Smith, and Steven Caunce; Manchester University Press, 2004).

Education:

- 1987; Masters in philosophy, Warsaw University, Poland
- 1995; Ph.D., Lódz University, Poland

Film critic Michał Oleszczyk writes she is one of the two Poland-born scholars leading the field of Polish films studies outside Poland (the other one being Marek Haltof).

== Selected bibliography ==
=== In English ===
- 2003 - From Moscow to Madrid: European Cities, Postmodern Cinema (co-author: Laura Rascaroli)
- 2004 - Dreams and Diaries: The Cinema of Nanni Moretti (co-author: Laura Rascaroli)
- 2006 - Crossing New Europe: Postmodern Travel and the European Road Movie
- 2006 - Women in Polish Cinema (co-author: Elżbieta Ostrowska)
- 2007 - Roman Polanski: The Cinema of a Cultural Traveller
- 2007 - Polish Postcommunist Cinema: From Pavement Level
- 2008 - Larks on a String: Masculinities in Polish and Czech and Slovak Cinema
- 2010 - Jerzy Skolimowski: The Cinema of a Nonconformist
- 2010 - Nabokov's Cinematic Afterlife
- 2017 - Poland Daily: Economy, Work, Consumption and Social Class in Polish Cinema
- 2020 - Popular Viennese Electronic Music, 1990-2015: A Cultural History

=== In Polish ===
- 1999 - Człowiek wobec kultury: James Ivory i jego filmy (Oficyna Wydawnicza ER, ISBN 83-900494-1-4)
- 1999 - Uwięzienie w teraźniejszości i inne postmodernistyczne stany: Twórczość Wong Kar-Waia (Książka i Prasa, ISBN 83-909696-7-X)
- 2007 - Słoneczne kino Pedra Almodóvara (Słowo/Obraz Terytoria, ISBN 978-83-7453-732-2)
- 2010 - Pasja. Filmy Jean-Luca Godarda (Korporacja Ha!art, ISBN 978-83-61407-23-2)
