= The Drama of the St. Mary's Church Tower =

- Directed by: Wiktor Biegański
- Written by: Wiktor Bieganski
- Starring: Włodzimierz Kosiński; Helena Górska; Władysław Puchalski; Wiktor Biegański
- Cinematography: Rajmund Czerny
- Release date: 1913
- Country: Poland
- Languages: Silent; Polish intertitles

The Drama of the St. Mary's Church Tower (Polish: Dramat Wieży Mariackiej) is a 1913 Polish silent drama film directed by Wiktor Biegański and starring Włodzimierz Kosiński, Helena Górska and Władysław Puchalski. The film was Bieganski's debut as a director. It was filmed in Lviv and Kraków, then part of Austria-Hungary. It is likely that the film and Bieganski's next production, The Adventures of Anton, were never put on general release. Elements of the film still survive.

== Cast ==
- Włodzimierz Kosiński as Szmidt
- Helena Górska as Ada
- Wiktor Biegański as Rudolf
- Władysław Puchalski as kamieniarz
