= Jealousy (1922 film) =

1922 film

- Directed by: Wiktor Biegański
- Written by: Wiktor Biegański
- Starring: Zofia Jaroszewska; Mariusz Maszynski; Antoni Piekarski; Michał Waszyński
- Cinematography: Zbigniew Gniazdowski
- Production company: Kinostudia
- Release date: 5 September 1922
- Country: Poland
- Languages: Silent; Polish intertitles

Jealousy (Polish:Zazdrosc) is a 1922 Polish silent drama film directed by Wiktor Biegański and starring Zofia Jaroszewska, Mariusz Maszynski and Antoni Piekarski.

== Cast ==
- Zofia Jaroszewska as Malgorzata Durerówna
- Mariusz Maszynski as Feuerbach, teacher
- Antoni Piekarski as Ludwik Durer, Malgorzata's father
- Michał Waszyński as Teacher
- Konstanty Meglicki as Parobek
- Jerzy Starczewski as Malarz
- Ignacy Miastecki
- Stanislawa Slubicka

== Bibliography ==
- Skaff, Sheila. The history of cinema in Poland and the transition from silent to sound film, 1896-1939. University of Michigan., 2004.
