= Marian Fuks (photographer) =

Polish photographer, photojournalist and film-maker (1884–1935)

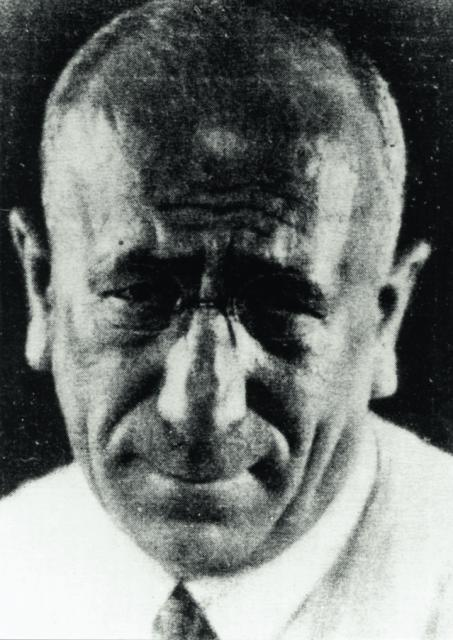
Portrait (possibly a self-portrait) of Fuchs, some time before 1935

Marian Fuks (his first name often rendered Marjan; 1884–1935) was a Polish photographer, photojournalist, and film-maker, one of pioneers of newsreel production and modern montage techniques.

== Life ==
Marian Fuks was born in 1884 in Warsaw, which was then Russian-held part of Poland. Initially a photojournalist for the Świat weekly, after 1906 Fuks opened up a photographic atelier in Warsaw which he expanded in 1910 into one of the first press photo agencies in Central Europe. In 1912 he also started filming newsreel reportages on important contemporary events, such as the trial of Damazy Macoch, the 1914 trial of Count Bogdan Jaksa-Ronikier or police officers apprehending criminals in Łódź. He also filmed the funeral of Bolesław Prus in May 1912. Before World War I he was among the founding members of the Association of Professional Photographers and the Society of Photography Professionals.

As a photojournalist he documented some of the most notable events in contemporary Polish history, including the entry of Polish Army in Kiev, and the May Coup d'État. In 1925 he also published a history of photojournalism in Poland Zaranie fotografii dziennikarskiej w Polsce.

Fuks also collaborated on a number of feature silent films, notably the 1912 silent film Obłąkany starring Stefan Jaracz and Carewicz, based on a play by Gabriela Zapolska and directed by William Wauer. In 1932 he released a documentary Gdańsk w cieniu swastyki ("Danzig in the Shadow of Swastika") on the rise of Nazism in the Free City of Danzig. He died in Warsaw in 1935, and his studio continued to function for a couple more years.
