= Vinaver =

Vinaver is a surname. Notable people with the surname include:

- Eugène Vinaver (1899–1979), Russian-born French scholar and British academic
- Maxim Vinaver (1863–1926), Russian lawyer, politician and patron
- Michel Vinaver (1927–2022), French dramatist and writer
- Stanislav Vinaver (1891–1955), Serbian writer, poet, translator, and journalist

== See also ==
- Winawer
