= Jan Pawłowski =

Polish footballer (born 1992)

Personal information
- Full name: Jan Paweł Pawłowski
- Date of birth: 18 November 1992 (age 33)
- Place of birth: Sokółka, Poland
- Height: 1.87 m (6 ft 1 1/2 in)
- Position: Striker

Team information
- Current team: Jagiellonia Białystok U19 (manager); KS Wasilków (assistant coach)

Youth career
- Sokół Sokółka
- 2005–2008: MOSP Jagiellonia Białystok

Senior career*
| Years | Team | Apps | (Gls) |
| 2009–2011 | Jagiellonia Białystok (ME) | 35 | (10) |
| 2009–2016 | Jagiellonia Białystok | 47 | (6) |
| 2012 | → Termalica Bruk-Bet (loan) | 12 | (2) |
| 2012–2013 | → Olimpia Grudziądz (loan) | 12 | (0) |
| 2013–2015 | Jagiellonia Białystok II | 18 | (7) |
| 2017–2020 | KS Wasilków | 28 | (19) |
| 2020–2022 | Jagiellonia Białystok II | 21 | (2) |
| 2022–2025 | KS Wasilków | 72 | (103) |
| Total | | 245 | (149) |
- * Club domestic league appearances and goals

Jan Paweł Pawłowski (born 18 November 1992) is a Polish former professional footballer who played as a striker. He currently serves as the manager of Jagiellonia Białystok's under-19 team, and is the assistant coach of IV liga Podlasie club KS Wasilków.

== Career ==
Pawłowski started his career with Jagiellonia Białystok.

== Honours ==
KS Wasilków

- IV liga Podlasie: 2018–19, 2024–25

== Notes ==
- Jan Pawłowski at 90minut.pl (in Polish)
- Profile at jagiellonia.neostrada.pl
- Profile at jagiellonia.pl
