= Rivals (1925 Polish film) =

1925 film

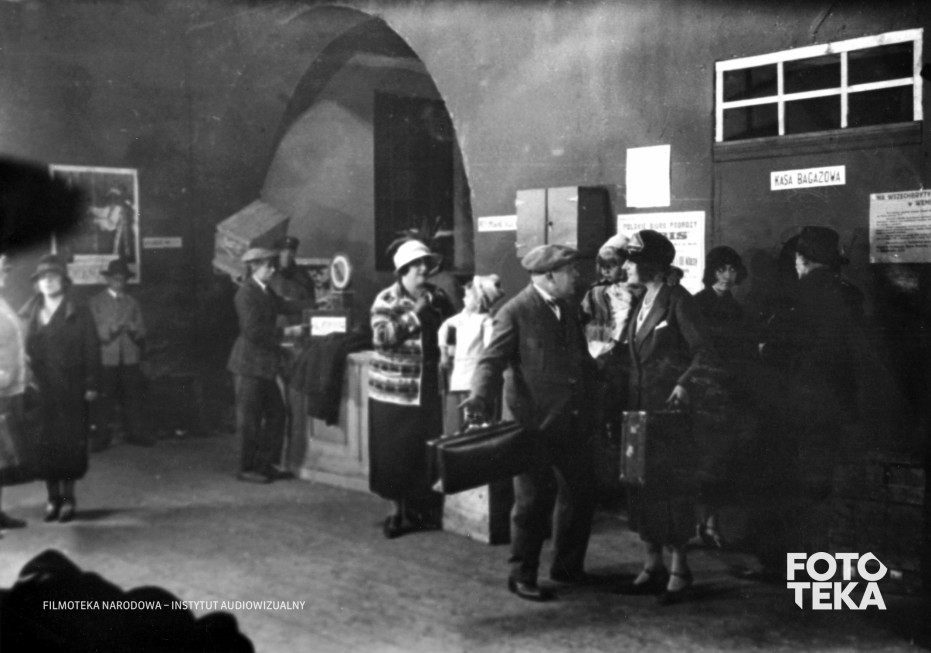
- Directed by: Henryk Szaro
- Written by: Konrad Tom
- Starring: Elna Gistedt; Antoni Fertner; Eugeniusz Bodo
- Cinematography: Seweryn Steinwurzel
- Music by: Tom Henryk
- Production company: Efes-Film
- Release date: 16 February 1925
- Country: Poland
- Languages: Silent; Polish intertitles

Rivals (Polish: Rywale) is a 1925 Polish silent romantic comedy film directed by Henryk Szaro and starring Elna Gistedt, Antoni Fertner and Eugeniusz Bodo.

== Cast ==
- Elna Gistedt as Gama
- Antoni Fertner as Tosio
- Eugeniusz Bodo as Genius
- Franciszek Radomski as Teobald, Gama's father
- Marian Koc
- Nina Wilinska
- Maria Chaveau
- Mieczyslaw Cybulski
- Michal Halicz
- Eugeniusz Koszutski
- Wanda Manowska
- Maria Mogilnicka
- Tadeusz Olsza
- Helena Peszynska
- Konrad Tom
- Waclaw Zdanowicz
- Józef Zejdowski
- Janina Zembianka

== Bibliography ==
- Ford, Charles & Hammond, Robert. Polish Film: A Twentieth Century History. McFarland, 2005.
- Haltof, Marek. Historical Dictionary of Polish Cinema. Rowman & Littlefield Publishers, 2015.
- Skaff, Sheila. The Law of the Looking Glass: Cinema in Poland, 1896-1939. Ohio University Press, 2008.
