= Bruno Winawer =

Polish Jewish physicist and author

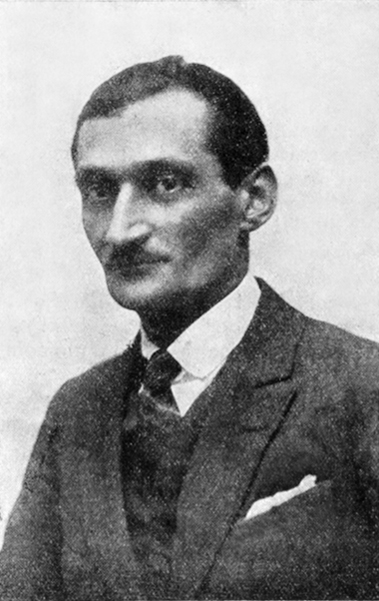
Bruno Winawer, ca. 1926

Bruno Winawer (17 March 1883 in Warsaw, Poland – 11 April 1944 in Opole Lubelskie, Poland) was a Jewish-descended Polish physicist, columnist, and author of comedies, science fiction novels, short stories, and poetry.

== Life ==
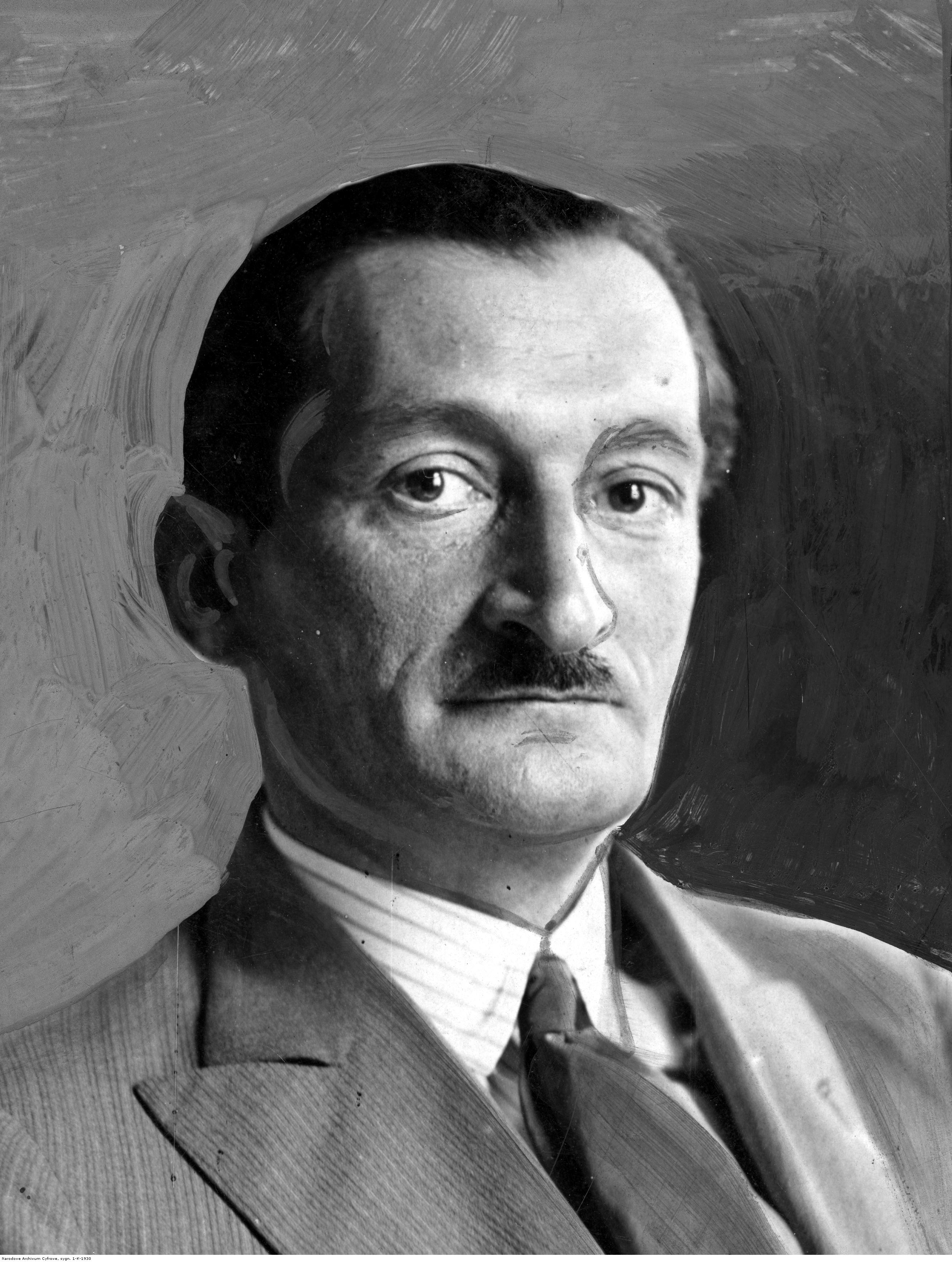
Winawer, 1930

Winawer studied physics at the University of Heidelberg, then served at the University of Amsterdam as assistant to Nobel laureate Pieter Zeeman.

In 1917–21 he held an academic post at the Warsaw Polytechnic, in Poland.

Winawer penned popular social comedies, often incorporating scientific themes; columns on science and literature; and science-fiction stories.

In 1921 he acted in the Polish silent film, Pan Twardowski.

Also in 1921, Joseph Conrad translated into English Winawer's short play, The Book of Job. Despite the translation’s shortcomings, Winawer felt pleased with it. But in spite of Conrad's efforts, the play was never staged in England; the translation was published only after Conrad's death.

After the outbreak of World War II, Winawer lived in Lwów, where he served as an assistant to physics Professor Stanisław Loria. In 1941, after the city's occupation by Nazi Germany, Winawer was sent to the Warsaw Ghetto; but in 1942 he managed to escape and lived under an assumed name. Arrested by the Germans, he was sent to the Treblinka concentration camp, but he again managed to escape.

== Death ==
He died on 11 April 1944 in Opole Lubelskie.

== Filmography ==
- Pan Twardowski (actor, 1921)
