= Maria Malicka (actress) =

Polish actress (1898–1992)

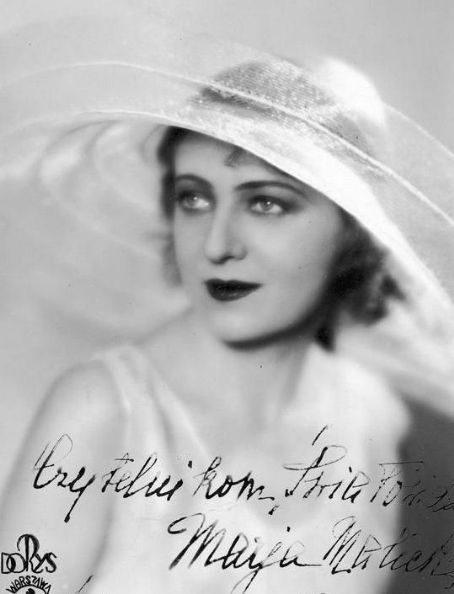
- Born: 9 May 1900; Krakau, Austria-Hungary (now Kraków, Poland)
- Died: 30 September 1992 (aged 92); Kraków, Poland
- Occupation: Actress
- Years active: 1927–1966
- Spouse: Zbigniew Sawan

Maria Malicka (9 May 1900 – 30 September 1992) was a Polish stage and film actress. She appeared in ten films between 1927 and 1966.

== Selected filmography ==
- The Call of the Sea (1927)
- The Wild Girl (1928)
- Uwiedziona (1931)
- Pan Twardowski (1936)
- Bariera (1966)
