= Janko Zwycięzca =

1921 film

- Directed by: Gustaw Cybulski
- Release date: 1921
- Country: Poland
- Language: Polish

Janko Zwycięzca is a 1921 Polish silent film comedy directed by Gustaw Cybulski.

== Cast ==
- Henryk Małkowski — Jas Czyzyk
- Jadwiga Doliwa — Magda
- Gustaw Cybulski — Plutonowy Brys
- Stanisława Kamińska
