= Aleksander Hertz =

Polish film producer and director

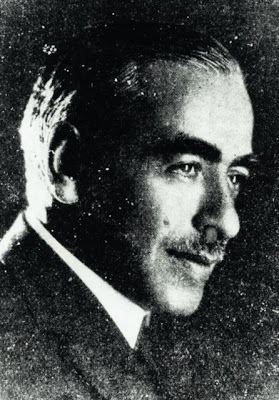
- Born: 1879; Warsaw, Congress Poland
- Died: 26 January 1928 (aged 48–49); Warsaw, Poland
- Occupations: Director; Producer
- Years active: 1911 - 1927

Aleksander Hertz (1879–1928) was a Polish film producer and director. Hertz was an influential figure in early Polish cinema, directing films such as the historical Countess Walewska in 1914. He founded the "Sfinks" film company. Hertz was of Jewish heritage.

== Selected filmography ==
=== Director ===
- Countess Walewska (1914)
- Bestia (1917)
- Ludzie bez jutra (People with no Tomorrow)

== Bibliography ==
- Liehm, Mira & Liehm, Antonín J. The Most Important Art: Eastern European Film After 1945. University of California Press, 1977.
