= Wojewoda (film) =

1912 film

Wojewoda is a Polish silent historical film. It was released in 1912.
