= Countess Walewska (1914 film) =

- Directed by: Aleksander Hertz
- Written by: Aleksander Hertz
- Starring: Stefan Jaracz; Maria Dulęba; Bronisław Oranowski
- Cinematography: Czeslaw Jakubowicz
- Production companies: Pathé Frères; Sokól
- Release date: 5 May 1914
- Country: Poland
- Languages: Silent; Polish intertitles

Countess Walewska is a 1914 Polish historical film directed by Aleksander Hertz and starring Stefan Jaracz, Maria Dulęba and Bronisław Oranowski. The film was made as a co-production with the French company Pathé Frères. It portrays the life of Maria Walewska the Polish-born mistress of the French Emperor Napoleon.

== Cast ==
- Stefan Jaracz as Napoleon Bonaparte
- Maria Dulęba as Maria Walewska
- Bronisław Oranowski as Duke Józef Poniatowski

== Bibliography ==
- Liehm, Mira & Liehm, Antonín J. The Most Important Art: Eastern European Film After 1945. University of California Press, 1977.
