= The Little Eagle =

1927 film

- Directed by: Wiktor Biegański
- Written by: Wiktor Biegański
- Produced by: Wiktor Biegański
- Starring: Oktawian Kaczanowski; Maria Majdrowicz; Nina Wilinska; Boleslaw Orlinski
- Cinematography: Antoni Wawrzyniak
- Release date: 1 January 1927
- Country: Poland
- Languages: Silent; Polish intertitles

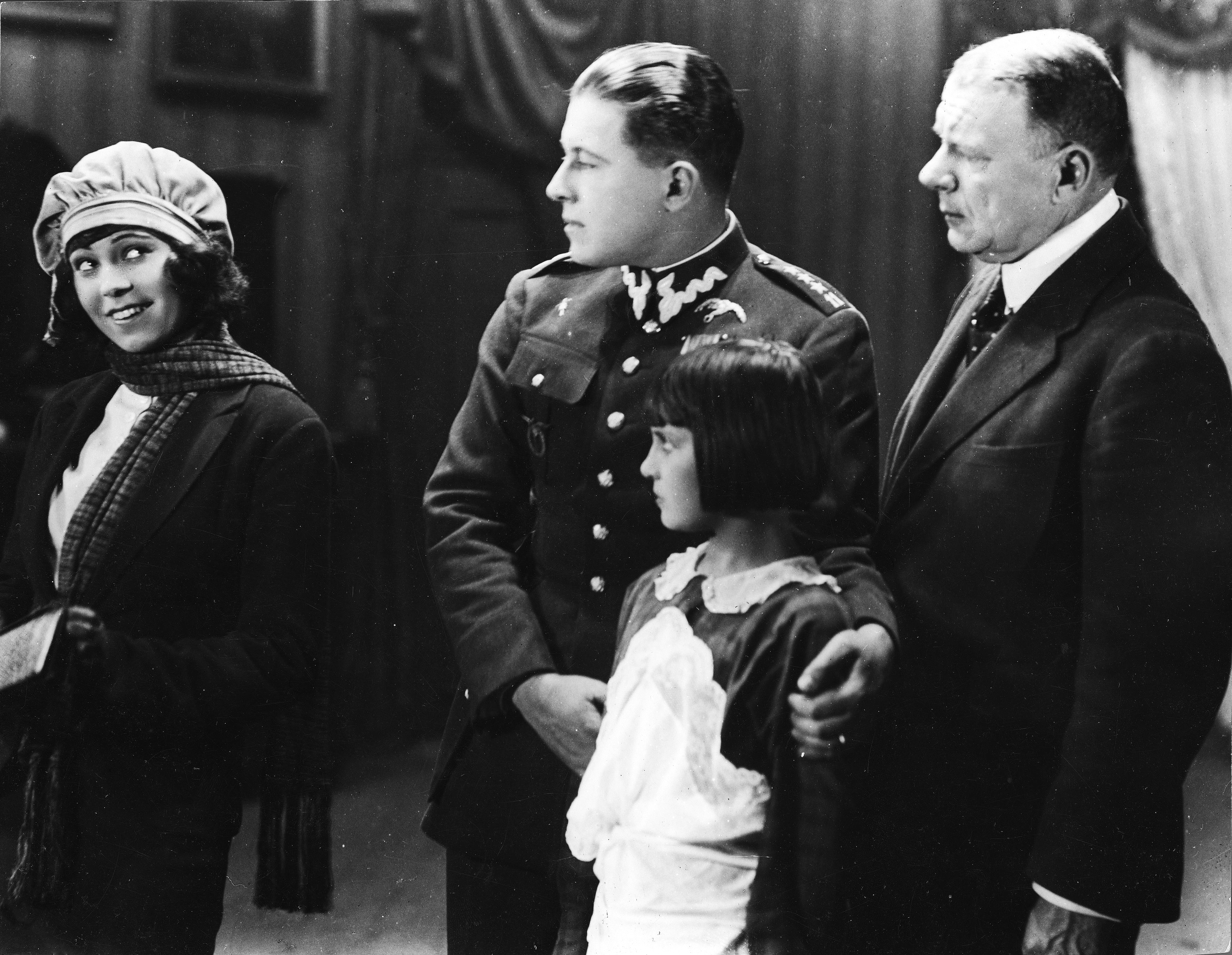
A scene from the film Orlę. From left: Nora Ney (as a shopgirl), Bolesław Orliński (as Kukliński's son, Janek, a military pilot), Nina Wilińska (as Krysia, Kukliński's daughter), and Oktawian Kaczanowski (as Janusz Kukliński, a former landowner).

The Little Eagle (Polish:Orlę) is a 1927 Polish silent comedy film directed by Wiktor Biegański and starring Oktawian Kaczanowski, Maria Majdrowicz and Nina Wilinska.

== Cast ==
- Oktawian Kaczanowski as Janusz Kuklinski
- Maria Majdrowicz as Halina Kuklinska
- Nina Wilinska as Krzysia Kuklinska
- Boleslaw Orlinski as Janek Kuklinski
- Jadwiga Daczynska as Ms. Zahorska
- Zdzisław Czermanski as Wiktor Zahorski
- Kurt R. Kurthoff as Hubert Stonor
- Hanka Ordonówna as Dancer, Stonor's friend
- Nora Ney as Panna sklepowa
- Lech Owron as Janosik
- Koszutski-Girls as Dancers

== Bibliography ==
- Skaff, Sheila. The Law of the Looking Glass: Cinema in Poland, 1896–1939. Ohio University Press, 2008.
