= Lokaj =

Lokaj is an Albanian surname. Notable people with the surname include:

- Fabian Lokaj (born 1996), an Albanian football player
- Nimon Lokaj (born 1941), an Albanian painter
