= Kult ciała =

1930 Polish film

- Directed by: Michał Waszyński
- Written by: Anatol Stern; Steve Sekely; Mieczysław Srokowski (novel)
- Produced by: Juliusz Zagrodzki
- Cinematography: Hans Theyer
- Music by: Teo Usuelli
- Release date: 18 January 1930
- Running time: 100 minutes
- Country: Poland
- Language: Polish

Kult ciała (The Cult of the Body) is a 1930 Polish film directed by Michał Waszyński. It is based on a novel by Mieczysław Srokowski and stars Victor Varconi.

== Cast ==
- Victor Varconi ... Czesław (as Michał Victor Varconyi)
- Agnes Petersen-Mozżuchinowa ... Hanka Złotopolska
- Fryderyk Delius ... Baron Stanisław Stumberg
- Krystyna Ankwicz ... Lina
- Eugeniusz Bodo ... Franciszek
- Paweł Owerłło ... Zahorski
