= Maria Dulęba =

Polish actress (1881–1959)

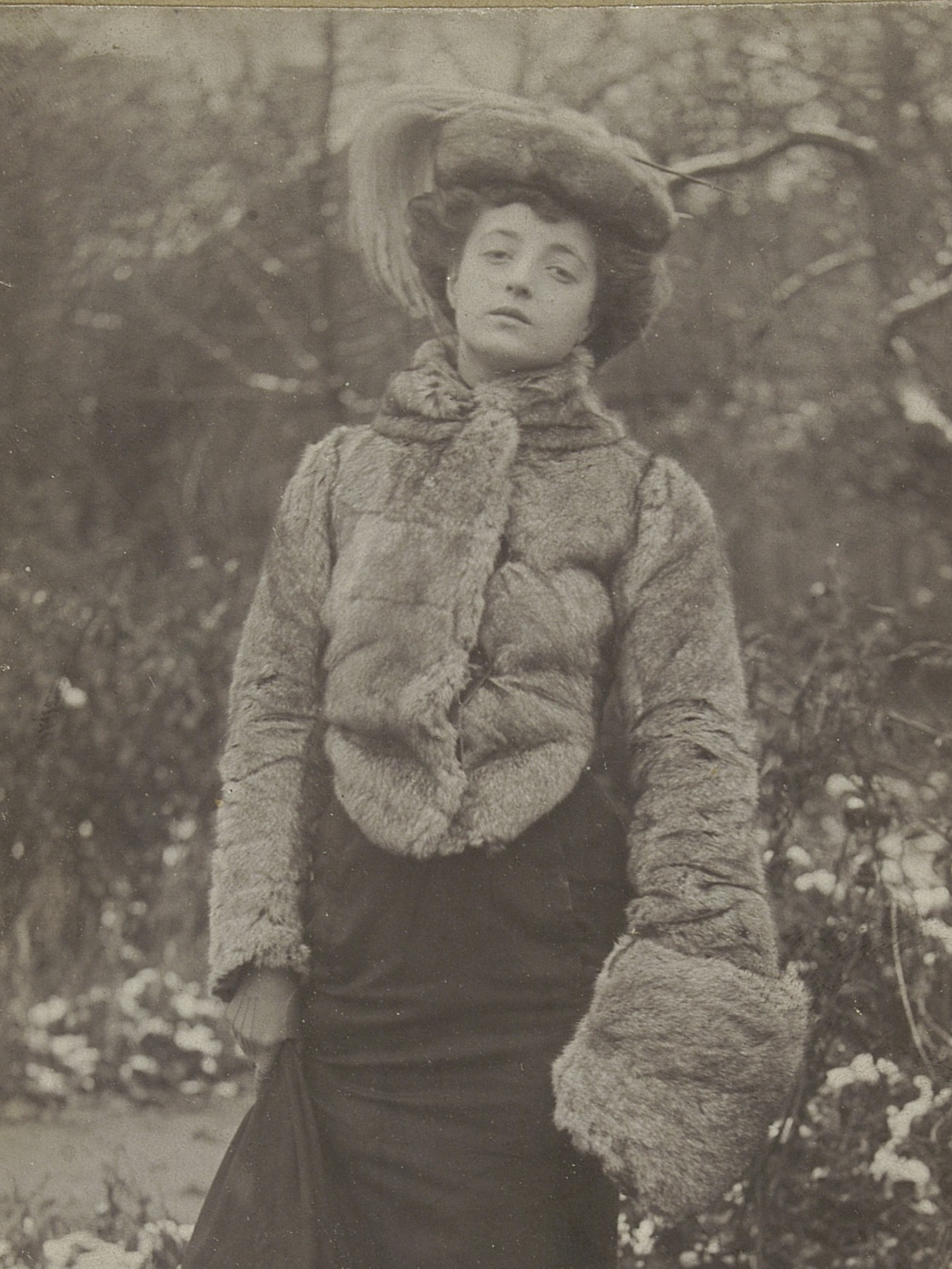
- Maria Dulęba in 1900
- Born: 17 October 1881; Kraków, Austria-Hungary
- Died: 6 May 1959 (aged 77); Warsaw, Poland
- Occupation: Actress

Maria Zofia Dulęba (17 October 1881– 6 May 1959) was a Polish stage and film actress. She made her stage debut in 1902 and performed in a number of films, mostly in the silent era. She later taught drama.

== Selected filmography ==
- Meir Ezofowicz (1911)
- Przesady (1912)
- Obrona Częstochowy (1913)
- Wykolejeni (1913)
- Slodycz grzechu (1914)
- Countess Walewska (1914)
- Bestia (1917)
- The Unspeakable (1924)
- The Story of Sin (1933)
- Żona i nie żona (1939)

== Bibliography ==
- Lerski, Halina. Historical Dictionary of Poland, 966-1945. ABC-CLIO, 30 Jan 1996.
