= The Morality of Mrs. Dulska =

Polish play

The Morality of Mrs. Dulska (Moralność pani Dulskiej)
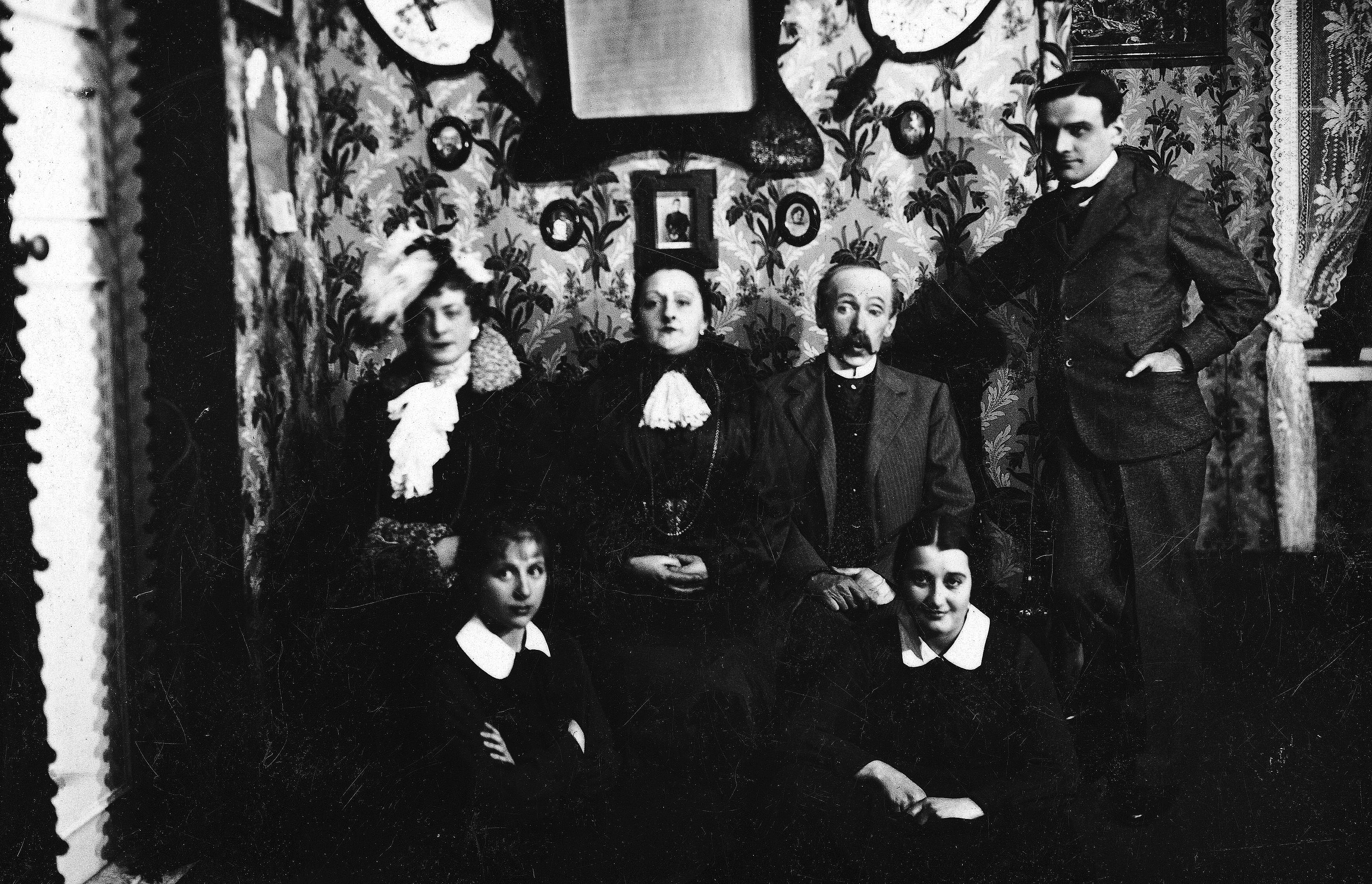
- Stage production of The Morality of Mrs. Dulska, Vilnius, 1935
- Original language: Polish
- Written by: Gabriela Zapolska
- Characters: Aniela Dulska; Felicjan Dulski; Zbyszko Dulski; Mela Dulska; Hesia Dulska; Juliasiewiczowa; Tenant; Hanka; Tadrachowa
- Genre: 'a petty-bourgeois tragic farce'
- Setting: Polish Galicia

Premiere
- Date: Krakόw, 1906

The Morality of Mrs. Dulska (Polish: Moralność pani Dulskiej) is a play by Gabriela Zapolska that debuted in Kraków in 1906. Hailed as a key work in early modern Polish drama, Zapolska's play tackles issues of social justice, socialism, morality, conscience, and the performative duality of social identity. It has inspired many film adaptations and has appeared on stage in many forms, even as a musical comedy.

Mrs. Dulska's view that "a secure living is the base of life... And as for a husband, you can train him" perfectly encapsulates the elements of bourgeois realism employed by Zapolska to bitingly skewer the inadequacy and hypocrisy of bourgeois life. As dramatist Alan P. Barr notes, "The Morality of Mrs. Dulska belongs to the social-protest literature that irritated the conservative sentiments of turn-of-the-century Europe". Zapolska's best known work, the enduringly popular play utilizes satiric wit to address the middle-class sensibilities of turn-of-the-century Galicia.

== Characters ==
- Aniela Dulska – mistress of the house; a landlady; shrewd, very concerned with appearances, dotes on her son
- Felicjan Dulski – her husband; passive and little-heard-from
- Zbyszko Dulski – their son; a philandering young man sick of his mother's overbearing tendencies
- Mela Dulska – their daughter; compassionate and concerned
- Hesia Dulska – their daughter; judgemental, sharp, and somewhat mean
- Juliasiewiczowa – a relation of Mrs. Dulska
- Tenant – a female tenant (attempts suicide)
- Hanka – The Dulski's servant, an exploited former peasant girl of low class
- Tadrachowa – Hanka's godmother, a washerwoman

== Plot ==
Mrs. Dulska is the tyrannical landlady of a nice tenement building who is prideful, clever, and above all else, concerned with appearances. Known for her thrifty nature and exploitive treatment of her tenants, she is a merciless embodiment of the bourgeois middle-class.

She exercises no sympathy or compassion toward those who rent from her. A first-floor tenant's attempted suicide by phosphorus necrosis is met with indifference, as is the fate of Hanka, her maid, whom she 'effectively prostitutes' to her son in an attempt to contain and control his philandering ways. Mela and Hesia, her daughters, are ignorant to the facts of life which she refuses to impart to them, instead insisting that they practice for their music lessons. Mr. Dulski, battered after years of his ruthless and overbearing wife, remains neutrally bland.

Mrs. Dulska's obsession is with her son, over whom she is wildly possessive. She is so afraid that he will abandon her that she bends to his every whim, especially with his relationship with Hanka that she foists upon them to curb his philandering. Despite this, he still resents her, particularly after she goes to great lengths to prevent his marriage to Hanka as she is horrified at what it will do to their social standing and their bloodline if he marries a poor peasant girl who is also their maid. Hanka is pregnant, and Zbyszko wants to marry her, but Mrs. Dulska tells her to get her registration book and get out, endeavoring to get her and the scandal that accompanies her out of their home.

Zbyszko's contempt for his mother and her social sensibilities is evident as he says he will marry Hanka anyway, telling her that her place is on the sofa next to Mrs. Dulska (much to Dulska's horror).

While Mela consoles Hanka, saying that she will be happy with Zbyszko, Hesia is unkind to her (primarily for reasons of class). Juliasiewiczowa is the first to posit the idea to Mrs. Dulska that Zbyszko has done all of this to spite her. Tadrachowa, Hanka's godmother, arrives, and makes a case for Hanka, saying that even though she is a bricklayer's daughter, she is an upstanding girl. She refers to herself as Zbyszko's 'mother-in-law' presumptively, a familiarity that horrifies Mrs. Dulska.

The play ends with Hanka being paid off (a thousand kronen) so that she will not speak of the engagement or her pregnancy, and so that she will not marry Zbyszko. At the close, Hanka is leaving, as Mela and Hesia reflect on her fate. Sympathetic and concerned, Mela frets that Hanka, a good and decent person, will kill herself. Hesia is laughing hysterically, saying that she has taken the thousand kronen to marry her alleged fiancé back in her home village, a customs man.

== Themes ==
=== Class aspiration and social sophistication ===
Class aspiration and/or social sophistication are at the heart of Mrs. Dulska's public persona, and translator Teresa Murjas utilised the expression of varying degrees of politeness and affectation present in the original Polish text to highlight a constant negotiation between the performed and public selves.

=== Duality of self ===
The Dulski family is full of double standards and contradictions in the way they dress and behave privately vs. publicly.

Polish actress Emilia Krakowska says the following of the "much-maligned landlady's sinful nature':

"Dulskaness confronts us at every step. It is middle-class duplicity, ignorance- that characteristic dual morality, distinctly dividing our behaviour between the home and the street. A morality encapsulated by the phrase 'what will people say?'

Zapolska's work received praise for its lack of oversimplification and complex examination of this particular middle-class sensibility, rendering it a well-constructed satire of the bourgeois.

Mrs. Dulska’s compartmentalized morals ("she can rent to whores, but not greet them; she can accept immorality if it is hidden indoors, but evicts a tenant who creates a scandal by trying to escape her abusive husband") reflect the divided lives and roles of her children, particular the son whom she dotes upon to the point of unhealthy possessiveness.

=== Cleanliness & moral "dirt" ===
Zapolska notes that Mrs. Dulska wears dirty, torn apparel when in the presence of her immediate family, but wears incredibly lavish and elaborate costumes in the presence of her 'public'. She has a "pathological love of cleanliness", polishing the floors in an obsessive manner "bordering on ritualistic" obligation. Contrasting to the meticulous attention to detail both in her clothing and cleaning, "the entire morally filthy, disgusting" business at the center of the play takes place

== Reception & Impact ==
The Morality of Mrs. Dulska was an immediate hit across all of partitioned Poland. During 1906-07 Krakow theatrical season, it had the longest run of the 82 staged texts, and, in March 1907, was seen by a record 5,000 audience members during that month alone. The play and its title character entered quickly into the vernacular, their notoriety cemented by the two follow-up stories Zapolska published in 1907, The Death of Felicjan Dulski and Mrs. Dulska in Court and by the 1909 satirical journal published in Krakow, Mrs. Dulska. As Polish stage writer Tadeusz Boy-Żeleński noted in 1932, she came to represent "a whole epoch". A new term arose in the Polish language: 'dulszczyzna', which roughly translates to "Dulska-ness" and functions as "a catch-all for the litany of reprehensible qualities exhibited by bourgeois philistine Aniela Dulska: double standards, endemic conservatism, excessive self-delusion, poor social conscience, weakness of character, hypocrisy, xenophobia, penny-pinching, vanity, pomposity, crassness, lack of compassion, sadistic self-aggrandizement, and bad taste", as notes translator Teresa Murjas.

== Translation ==
The predominant English language translation was developed by Dr. Teresa Murjas in conjunction with the University of Reading as a research project. Staged at the Centre for Polish Culture (POSK) in Hammersmith, London, Murjas's translation attempts to preserve the formality of address and early 20th century language of the period in which Zapolska wrote the Polish version of the play.

== Notable Productions ==
=== Film adaptations ===
- Boleslaw Niewolin's 1930 film, notable as the first Polish movie with sound (recorded on a gramophone record)
- cs:Morálka paní Dulské (1958)
- pl:Dulscy (1976)
- Panie Dulskie (2015)

=== 1967 Krakow Production ===
Lidia Zamkow's significant 1967 production presented the show with a contemporary set and costumes, departing from the realist depictions of Dulska predominant in theatre. The production also blurred the lines between the unpleasant characteristics of Mrs. Dulska's personality, making their depiction much more subtle, which sharpened the satiric element of Zapolska's work.

=== Dulska! (1989 Musical) ===
The 1989 musical adaptation of the play presented the events through an 'erotic cabaret-style set' in the bourgeois drawing room of the Dulski family. The production was viewed largely as an attempt to attract younger audiences to the classics and to reinvigorate audiences and students alike who had been 'overexposed' to the hugely popular work. The production also featured a revival of the undercurent sexuality present throughout the work

=== 2004 London Production ===
This first performance of the show in Britain was in Hammersmith, London, and was part of Dr. Teresa Murjas's translation project aimed at bringing this well-known Polish play into the English-speaking world. Staged at the Centre for Polish Culture (POSK) in Hammersmith, London, Murjas modelled the staging and many production elements on the 1967 Krakow production.

== See also ==
- Gabriela Zapolska
- Teresa Murjas
- Centre for Polish Culture (POSK)
- Polish theatre
