= Melodie Winawer =

American neurologist

Melodie Winawer is a board certified neurologist and the director of clinical neuroscience education at the Columbia University College of Physicians and Surgeons. Her primary research is the genetics of epilepsy, in which she examines how certain genes are risk factors for epilepsy. She is also a published author.

== Education ==
She attended the University of Pennsylvania School of Medicine and graduated in 1994. She then completed her internship at Mount Sinai Medical Center and residency at New York-Presbyterian/ Columbia University Medical center. Additionally, she completed two fellowships at the Columbia University Mailman School of Public Health and the Neurological Institute of the Columbia-Presbyterian Hospital. In total, she has an undergraduate degree in biological psychology from Yale University, a medical degree from the University of Pennsylvania, and a master's degree in epidemiology from Columbia University.

== Medical career ==
Her research uses genetic epidemiology techniques and mouse models to both analyze genes that may play a role in clinical epilepsy in humans and determine genes that increase seizure susceptibility.

She has received funding from the CURE foundation (Citizens United for Research in Epilepsy), the National Institute of Health, and the Epilepsy Consortium for her research into the role of genetics in epilepsy. She has served as the Principal Investigator for multiple studies. These include a study on the genetics of mouse seizure susceptibility with the NIH/NINDS from 2008 to 2013, and the Human Epilepsy Project, which worked to identify a variety of predictors for new-onest epilepsy.

Her work also includes seeing patients, running human studies to identify genes associated with epilepsy, and designing neuroscience courses. She is affiliated with New York-Presbyterian Hospital and Columbia University Irving Medical Center. Additionally, she teaches as an Associate Professor of Neurology at the Gertrude H. Sergievsky Center at Columbia University Irving Medical Center.

She received the Seymour Diamond Lectureship Award from the National Headache Foundation in 2014, an award which is granted to the author of the most significant paper related to headaches from the previous year.

== Writing career ==
Melodie is the author of two novels. Anticipation, a dual timeline story set in late Byzantine and modern Greece, is scheduled for publication in November, 2021. The Scribe of Siena (2017), a medieval Italian historical novel that explores the mystery of Siena’s devastation by the Plague, has been translated into German, Czech, Polish and Norwegian. Melodie has also published a short story, "778," which is included in the collection We All Fall Down: Stories of Plague and Resilience.
