= Bestia (1917 film) =

Bestia (English title: The Polish Dancer)
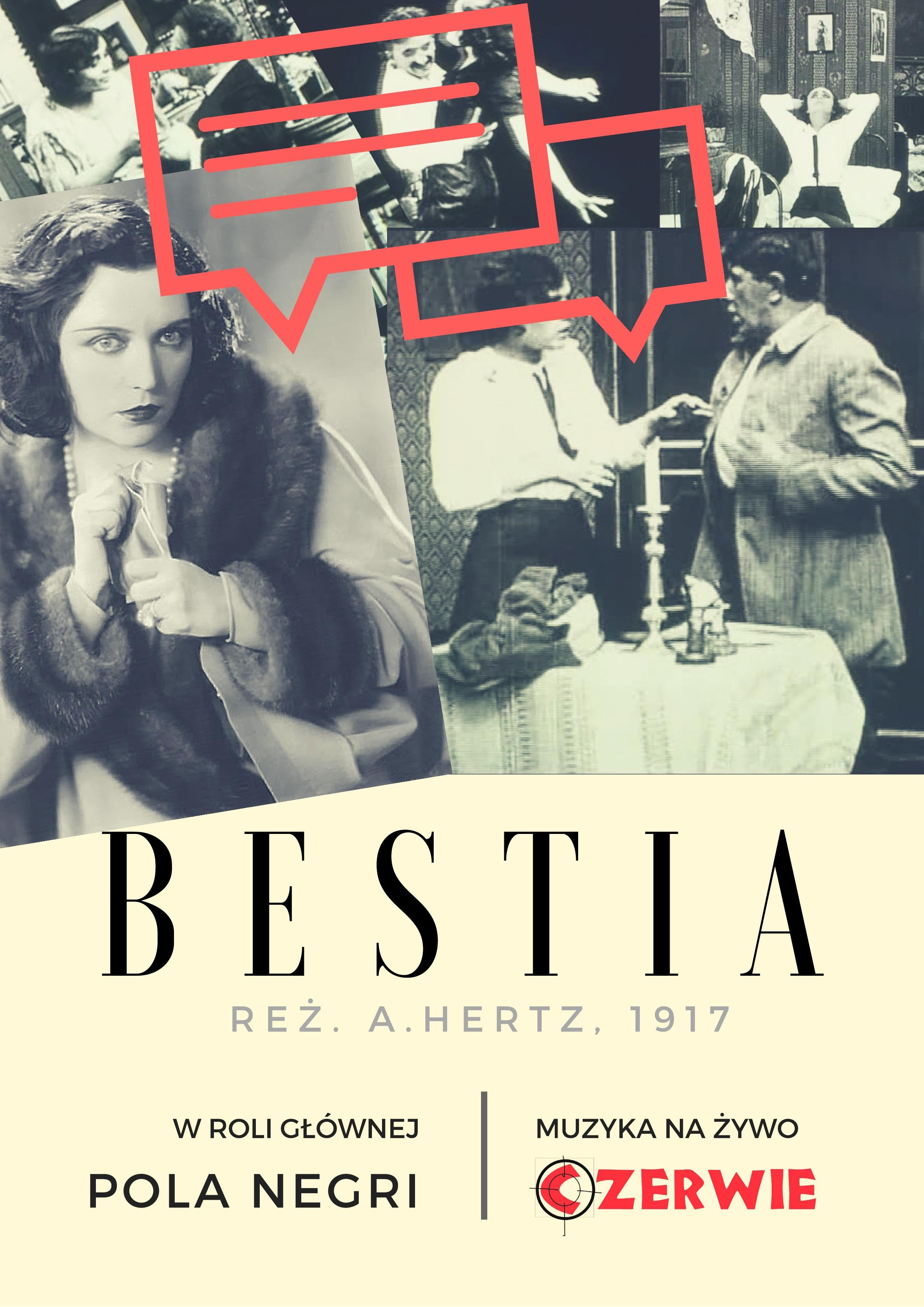
- film poster
- Directed by: Aleksander Hertz
- Starring: Pola Negri; Maria Dulęba; Jan Pawłowski; Mia Mara
- Cinematography: Witalis Korsak-Gołowski
- Distributed by: UFA
- Release date: 1917
- Running time: 63 minutes
- Country: Poland
- Language: Silent film

Bestia or The Polish Dancer (1917) by Aleksander Hertz

Bestia is a 1917 Polish silent film starring Pola Negri. It was directed by Aleksander Hertz and released by Warsaw-based film studio Sphinx Company. It was released in the U.S. under the title The Polish Dancer in 1921.

== Plot ==
Pola Basnikov is an adolescent girl living with her parents. She likes to stay out late and rabblerouse with her friends, to the worry of her parents. One night she and her father get into a fight, so Pola decides to run away. Her boyfriend, Dmitri, helps her get lodging at a hotel. Pola gets him drunk, takes all his money, and leaves, leaving behind a note promising to pay him back. Pola gets work as a model at a modeling studio, which opens up work for her as a cabaret dancer. One of the cabaret's patrons, a married man named Alexi, is taken by Pola, and the two engage in an affair, with Pola unaware that Alexi already has a family. Once Alexi gets the courage to leave his wife, he and Pola go to Cafe de Paris to celebrate. There, her old boyfriend, Dmitri, waits on them, but does not recognize Pola. Pola repays the money she took from him, leaving it with a note on the table. When Dmitri finds the money and the note, he is enraged and plans to take revenge on Pola. Meanwhile, Alexi's wife, Sonya, grants him a divorce, and moves in with her mother, only to become deathly ill. Pola learns that Alexi is married and casts him off, not realizing that he has already left his family for her. Soon after, the vengeful ex-boyfriend Dmitri kills Pola. Alexi tries to reconcile with his wife, only to learn that she has succumbed to her illness and has died.

== Production and release ==
Bestia was filmed in Warsaw, under German occupation, in 1916 and made its screen debut on January 5, 1917. The film features a lengthy dance sequence from popular theater actress Mia Mara, who was given top billing in a newspaper ad for Bestia in a period Polish newspaper. Mara went on to act in silent films in Germany under the name Lya Mara, most notably performing in G.W. Pabst's The Joyless Street (1925).

The film was released theatrically in the United States in 1921 on a States Rights basis by S.R. Levinson under the name The Polish Dancer. Copies of this version of the film survive at the George Eastman house and at the National Film Archive in Poland. The copy in Poland was brought from the United States in 1963 from the Museum of Modern Art in New York.

The Polish Dancer was digitally restored and released on DVD in 2011 by Bright Shining City Productions as part of the 3-DVD set Pola Negri: The Iconic Collection.

The film was digitally restored again in 2017, to celebrate the 100th anniversary of the film's release, by DI Factory and reKINO Studios in a project co-financed by the Polish Film Institute.

This is the only surviving Polish film of Pola Negri.

== Reception ==
Berlin-based author and journalist Frank Noack praises Pola Negri's performance in the film as "innovative," and says of the film itself, "[it] is rather well lit, its direction and cinematography are solid but unadventurous and not particularly inventive, and all the roles are well cast."

Blogger Chris Edwards says of the film, "I can't recommend The Polish Dancer, but I can recommend moments in it. For Pola Negri fans,...[i]t is an artifact from the earliest years of the career of a star. And an unrefined sample of the 'it' that made her great."

== Cast ==
- Pola Negri as Pola Basznikow
- Maria Dulęba as Sonia
- Witold Kuncewicz as Aleksy
- Jan Pawłowski as Dymitr
- Lya Mara
