= Pan Twardowski (1921 film) =

1921 film

- Directed by: Wiktor Biegański
- Written by: Wiktor Biegański; Mieczysław Szerer; Adam Zagórski
- Produced by: Józef Szwajcer
- Starring: Bronisław Oranowski; Wanda Jarszewska; Antoni Nowara-Piekarski; Maria Krzyżanowska
- Cinematography: Stanisław Sebel
- Production company: Polfilma
- Release date: February 1921
- Running time: 59 minutes
- Country: Poland
- Languages: Silent; Polish intertitles

Pan Twardowski is a 1921 Polish silent fantasy film directed by Wiktor Biegański and starring Bronisław Oranowski, Wanda Jarszewska and Antoni Nowara-Piekarski. Biegański was hired by the Polish government to make the film in an effort to foster a greater sense of Polish national identity—particularly in the ethnically mixed Upper Silesia. It is one of many films based on the legend of Pan Twardowski, the Polish word "Pan" being a respectable title often given to members of the nobility or diplomats.

== Plot ==
According to a 16th-century Polish legend, an occultist from Kraków sold his soul to the Devil in exchange for magic powers, but later reneged on the deal. The character is said to have been based on a real-life 16th century German nobleman who lived in Kraków and Nuremberg. There were many variations of the folktale over the years and since this film is now considered lost, it's impossible to tell which variation of the legend was used for the plot. But the 1936 sound film remake is said to have followed the story of this film closely, so the two films' storylines must be very similar.

== Cast ==
- Bronisław Oranowski as Mr. Twardowski
- Wanda Jarszewska as Mrs. Twardowska
- Antoni Nowara-Piekarski as Iwan IV Groźny
- Maria Krzyżanowska as Królowa nimf
- Mila Kamińska as Ulubienica cara
- Antoni Siemaszko as Stary bojar
- Władysław Grabowski as Młody Bojar
- Stanisław Bryliński as Diabeł
- Paweł Dydek-Dudziński as Pokurcz
- Władysław Lenczewski
- Stanisława Umińska
- Bruno Winawer
- Zofia Żukowska

== Bibliography ==
- Skaff, Sheila. The Law of the Looking Glass: Cinema in Poland, 1896–1939. Ohio University Press, 2008.
