= Gabriela Zapolska =

Polish writer (1857-1921)

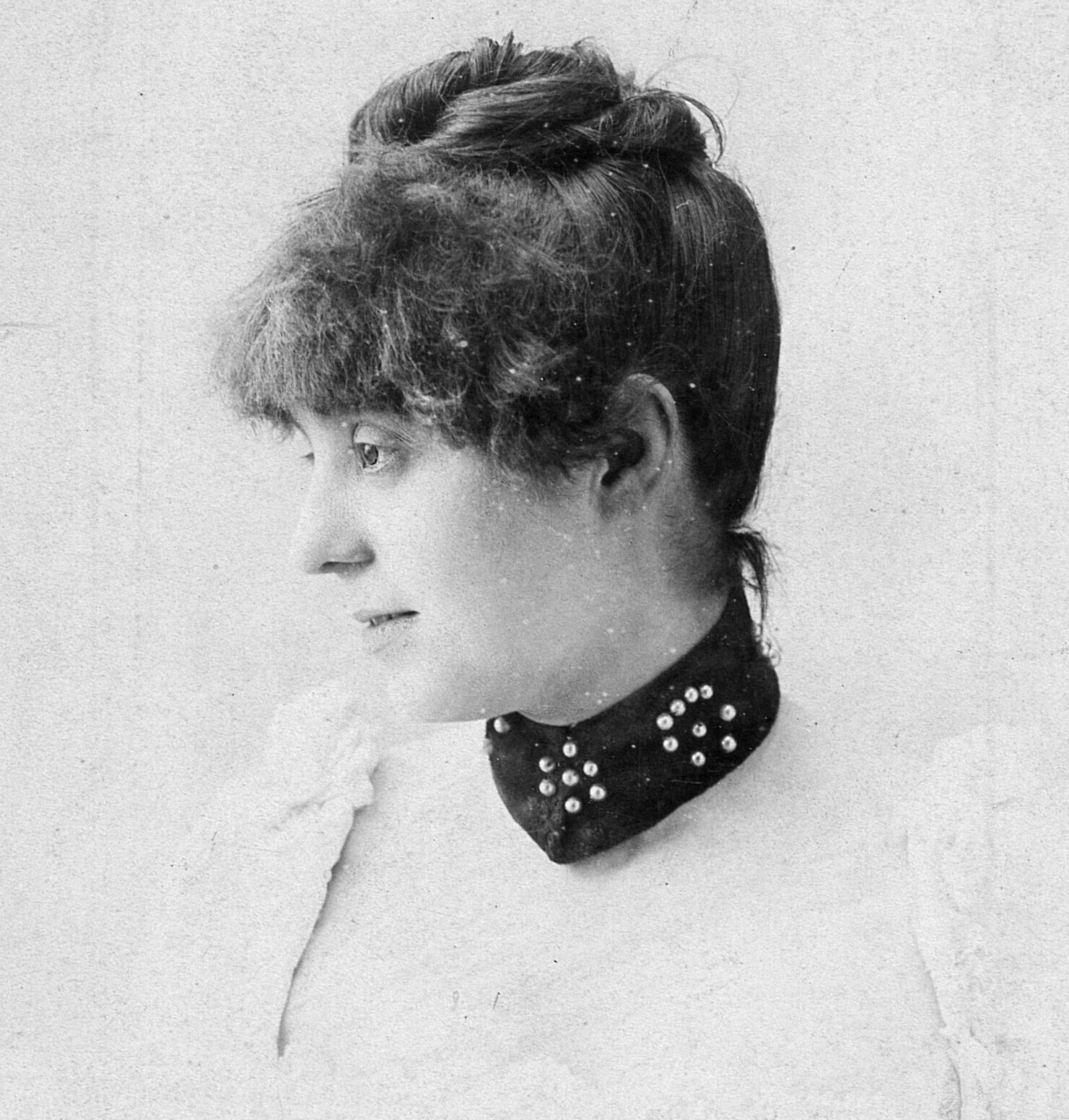
- Born: 30 March 1858; Pidhaitsi, Lutsky Uyezd, Volhynia Governorate, Russian Empire
- Died: 17 December 1921 (aged 64); Lwów, Poland
- Occupations: Novelist, publicist, playwright, prosaist
- Spouse(s): Konstanty Śnieżko-Błocki (divorced); Stanisław Janowski (divorced)
- Writing career
- Pen name: Gabriela Zapolska, Józef Maskoff, Walery Tomicki, Maryja, Marya, Omega, Szczerba
- Literary movement: Naturalism

Maria Gabriela Stefania Korwin-Piotrowska (1857–1921), known as Gabriela Zapolska, was a Polish novelist, playwright, naturalist writer, feuilletonist, theatre critic and stage actress. Zapolska wrote 41 plays, 23 novels, 177 short stories, 252 works of journalism, one film script, and over 1,500 letters.

Zapolska received most recognition for her socio-satirical comedies. Among them, The Morality of Mrs. Dulska, a tragic-farce, satirising ‘respectable’ bourgeois morals, is considered the most famous, and generally regarded as a landmark of early modernist Polish drama. Her stage plays were translated into foreign languages, and performed at Polish and European theatres, as well as adapted for radio and film. Zapolska herself acted on stage in over 200 plays in Warsaw, Kraków, Poznań, Lwów, Saint Petersburg and Paris.

== Life ==
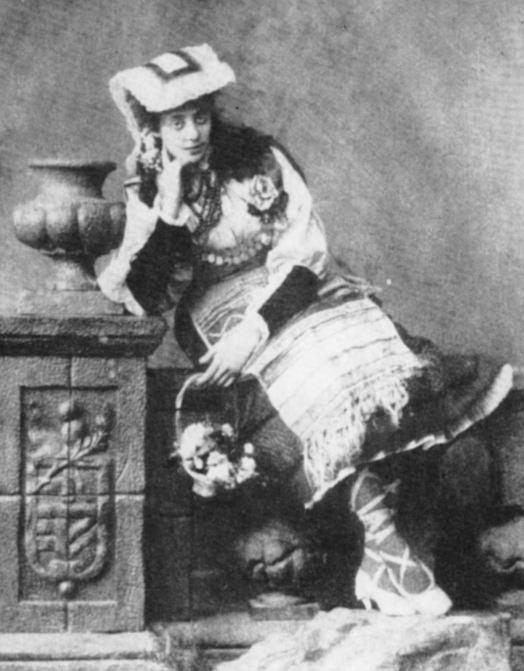
Zapolska in A Doll's House, 1883.

Zapolska was born on 30 March 1857 in Pidhatsi, near Lutsk, in Volhynia, to a wealthy family of Polish landed gentry. At that time, this territory was part of the Russian Empire. Her father, Wincenty Kazimierz Jan Korwin-Piotrowski, was a marshal of Volhynian szlachta. Her mother. Józefa Karska, a former ballet dancer. Zapolska studied at the Sacré Coeur Institute and in the Institute of Education and Science in Lwów. In 1876 she was forced by her family to marry a Polish lieutenant in the Tsarist guard, Konstanty Śnieżko-Błocki, but soon left him and divorced in 1888. During the years of 1879–1880 she lived in Warsaw, where she acted in an amateur theatre ran by the Philanthropy Society. In 1881 Zapolska became pregnant by an out-of-wedlock relationship and left her family. The same year she made her own short story debut by Jeden dzień z życia róży (One Day in the Life of a Rose). The following year, in 1882, she became a professional actress in the Kraków theatre, and assumed the pseudonym of Gabriela Zapolska. She also acted in Poznań, and in travelling troupes throughout the Congress Poland. In October 1888 she reportedly made a suicide attempt.

In 1889, Zapolska moved to Paris in hopes of an artistic career. There, she played minor roles in boulevard theatres, Théâtre Libre and Théâtre de l'Œuvre. She played in a stage adaptation of Intérieur (Interior) by Maurice Maeterlinck in Théâtre de l'Oeuvre. In Paris, Zapolska established contacts within the artistic milieu as well as with Polish socialist emigrants, which influenced her social views.

After coming back to her country, she settled in Kraków and acted in garden theatres, travelling troupes, and then in Kraków Juliusz Słowacki Theatre directed by Tadeusz Pawlikowski. Her defiant, suffragist nature led to conflicts with theatre principals. Following Pawlikowski's departure, in 1900 she abandoned her contract. After that, Zapolska set up her own stage which was active time-by-time. In 1902 Zapolska ran a drama school in Kraków and the Gabriela Zapolska Independent Theatre was founded later. Her experiences in Paris let her to produce two Maeterlinck stage adaptations – Princess Maleine, and L'Intruse (The Intruder), both produced in 1902.

In 1904 she moved to Lwów and married a painter, Stanisław Janowski. She became a patron of the travelling theatre named after her (Gabriela Zapolska Theatre) which during the years of 1907–1908 toured Galicia. She divorced her second husband in 1910. In the years of 1912–1913 Zapolska was a literary director of Teatr Premier. As a feuilletonist and theatre critic she collaborated with Gazeta Krakowska, Słowo Polskie, Nowa Reforma, Ilustracja Polska and Wiek Nowy. In 1915, after Lwów was captured by the Russian Army, she ran a small confectionery. Zapolska died on 17 December 1921 in Lwów (now Lviv, Ukraine) and buried at the Lychakivskiy Cemetery there.

== Style and themes ==
Gabriela Zapolska's works were dominated by naturalism – a literary movement seeking to replicate everyday reality. She was mainly influenced by Émile Zola, a French naturalist writer. Her output has a journalistic and didactic tone. She portrayed the lives of the poorest and most vulnerable people including proletarians, Jews, servants, prostitutes, etc.

Characters in Zapolska's works are mostly of ordinary type. She tends to skip psychological analysis as it was specific for the Young Poland writers. She also brought up controversial subjects, such as prostitution and venereal disease (O czym się mówi, O czym się nawet myśleć nie chce).

Zapolska created embittered literary characters, such as those in her best-known works, Moralność pani Dulskiej, Żabusia, Ich czworo. Tragedia ludzi głupich, Sezonowa miłość, and Panna Maliczewska.

=== Prose ===
Gabriela Zapolska made her own short story debut in 1881 by Jeden dzień z życia róży. Many of her early works was published in parts in Lwów and then, in Warsaw press, mainly in Przegląd Tygodniowy. She collected her early short stories in the volume of Z dziejów boleści (1890). Her novels and short stories were translated into many languages, including English, Russian, German, Swedish, Czech, Slovak, Hungarian, Ukrainian. Zapolska was criticized by conservatives for the more naturalist aspects of her works, such as perceived immorality, squalor, taboo subjects, etc. Notable Zapolska prose works include:

- Jeden dzień z życia róży (One Day in the Life of a Rose, 1881)
- Małaszka (1883)
- Kaśka Kariatyda (Cathy the Caryatid, 1885–1886)
- Przedpiekle (1889)
- Menażeria ludzka (1893)
- Janka (1895)
- Fin-de-sièclistka (Fin-de-siècle-ist, 1897)
- Zaszumi las (1899)
- Sezonowa miłość (1904)
- Córka Tuśki (1907)
- Pani Dulska przed sądem (1908)
- O czym się nie mówi (1909)
- Śmierć Felicjana Dulskiego (Death of Felicjan Dulski, 1911)
- Kobieta bez skazy (1913)
- O czym się nawet myśleć nie chce (1914)

=== Dramas ===
Zapolska is best known for her dramas, socio-satirical comedies and tragicomedy works. Her Moralność pani Dulskiej, a 'petty-bourgeois tragic-farce', is considered by her most-known work and regarded as a landmark of early modernist Polish drama. The story of Moralność pani Dulskiej was continued in two short stories—Pani Dulska przed sądem and Śmierć Felicjana Dulskiego. Her dramas were translated into other languages, played at the Polish and European stages, and adapted into radio and film. Notable Zapolska dramas include:

- Żabusia (Froggie, 1897)
- Małka Szwarcenkopf (1897)
- Jojne Firułkes (1898)
- The Morality of Mrs. Dulska, (1906)
- Ich czworo. Tragedia ludzi głupich (1907)
- Skiz (1908)
- Panna Maliczewska (Miss Maliczewska, 1910)

== Film adaptations ==
Movies based on Zapolska novels or dramas include:

- Carewicz (1918) – directed by Marian Fuks
- Tamten (1921) – by Władysław Lenczewski
- The Unspeakable (1924) – by Edward Puchalski
- Policmajster Tagiejew (1929) – by Juliusz Gardan
- Moralność pani Dulskiej (1930) – by Boleslaw Newolin; the first Polish movie with sound recorded on a gramophone record
- O czym się nie mówi (1939) – by Mieczysław Krawicz
- Morálka paní Dulské (adaption of Moralność pani Dulskiej, 1958) – by Jiří Krejčík; a Czechoslovak movie

== See also ==
- Feminism in Poland
- List of feminist literature
- List of Poles
- Polish literature

== Notes and references ==
- "Zapolska Gabriela". Nowa encyklopedia powszechna PWN. Vol. 6 (1st ed.). Warsaw: Wydawnictwo Naukowe PWN. 1997. p. 984. ISBN 83-01-11969-1.
- "Zapolska Gabriela". WIEM Encyklopedia (in Polish). Archived from the original on 2007-11-04.
