= The Wild Girl (1928 film) =

1928 film

- Directed by: Henryk Szaro
- Written by: Leon Brun; Henryk Szaro; Irena Zarzycka
- Produced by: Juliusz Zagrodzki
- Starring: Maria Malicka; Zbigniew Sawan; Aleksander Zabczynski
- Cinematography: Juliusz Mars; Ferdynand Vlassak
- Production company: Lux Film
- Release date: 29 November 1928
- Country: Poland
- Languages: Silent; Polish intertitles

The Wild Girl (Polish: Dzikuska) is a 1928 Polish silent drama film directed by Henryk Szaro and starring Maria Malicka, Zbigniew Sawan and Aleksander Zabczynski. The film's sets were designed by the art director Stefan Norris.

== Cast ==
- Michal Orlicz-Hryniewicz as Tomasz Kruszynski
- Maria Malicka as Ita Kruszynska, daughter
- Edward Nowina as Antoni Kruszynski, son
- Zbigniew Sawan as Student Witold Leski
- Zofia Czaplinska as Mrs. Leska, Witold's mother
- Alicja Borg as Janeczka Rosowska
- Aleksander Zabczynski as Baron Janusz Ziemski
- Wanda Zawiszanka as Ela Ziemska, baron's daughter
- Wieslawa Morecka as Maryska

== Bibliography ==
- Ford, Charles, Hammond, Robert, Polish Film: A Twentieth Century History. McFarland, 2005.
- Haltof, Marek. Historical Dictionary of Polish Cinema. Rowman & Littlefield Publishers, 2015.
- Skaff, Sheila. The Law of the Looking Glass: Cinema in Poland, 1896-1939. Ohio University Press, 2008.
