= Nina Niovilla =

Polish film director, screenwriter, actress, translator and teacher

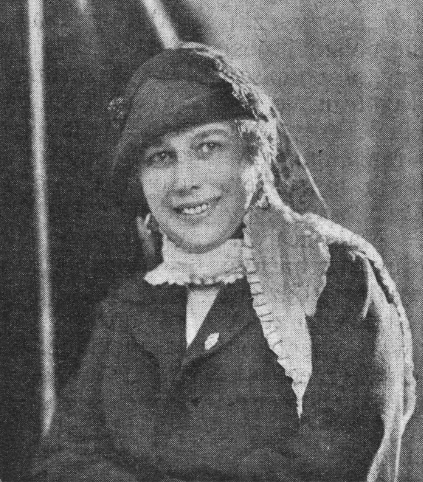
- Born: Antonina Elżbieta Petrykiewicz; 1874; Lviv
- Died: 1966 (aged 91–92); Paris
- Occupations: director, screenwriter, actress, translator, teacher

Antonina Elżbieta Petrykiewicz (born 1874, died 1966), better known as Nina Niovilla, was a Polish film director, screenwriter, actress, translator and a teacher. She was the first Polish female film director and the only female director of the silent film era in Poland.

== Life ==
She was born in 1874 in Lwow as Antonina Elżbieta Petrykiewicz. During World War I she made a living as a singer and an actress in Warsaw and Berlin.

In 1906 she had a daughter Ludwika Janina born in Lwow.

Niovilla was the first Polish woman to direct a film and – at the same time – the only female film director of the silent film era in Poland. She debuted in 1918 in Berlin, where she directed the movie Die Heiratsannonce, under a pseudonym Nina von Petry. Her first Polish film was Tamara, also known as Obrońcy Lwowa (1919), which she directed after returning to Poland. With its use of the Battle of Lemberg as the background of the plot, Tamara had a patriotic theme, which was a popular motif in Polish filmmaking at the time. As with all the films that followed, Niovilla wrote the script herself.

Her second Polish film was the melodrama Czaty – an adaptation of a ballad by Adam Mickiewicz about a jealous husband, which premiered on 20 November 1920. The rights to screen the picture were sold abroad. Around this time, Niovilla also performed in the Qui Pro Quo cabaret. Her next film, Idziem do ciebie, Polsko, matko nasza (1921) saw her return to patriotic themes. Niovilla’s final film was the melodrama Młodość zwycięża (1923), which she also produced. In 1926 the press informed that Niovilla was set to direct the film W szponach szakali based on a script by Kazimierz Krzyżanowski. None of her work has survived.

In 1926, Niovilla became one of the first international delegates of ZAIKS at the 35. ALAI Congress.

At the end of the 1920s she appeared in films and theatre plays directed by Danny Kaden (Niebezpieczny pocałunek), Edward Puchalski (Ludzie dzisiejsi), as well as Adam Augustynowicz and Ryszard Biske (9.25. Przygoda jednej nocy). She also taught acting. In 1919, she opened her own acting school in Warsaw called Warszawska Szkoła Gry Sceniczno-Filmowej and later opened its branches in Poznań, Vilnius, Lviv and Kraków. One of the school’s alumni was Aleksander Żabczyński.

Apart from working on films and teaching, Niovilla also translated theatre plays from English and French to Polish, which were then staged at, among others, the Polish Theatre in Warsaw, the National Theatre, the Teatr Nowy in Poznań and the Teatr Rozmaitości in Lviv. She also contributed to film magazines such as Sztuka i Film and Rewia Filmowa.

She left Poland in 1946 to join her daughter in Paris, where she died 20 years later. She was buried at the Batignolles Cemetery.

== Works ==
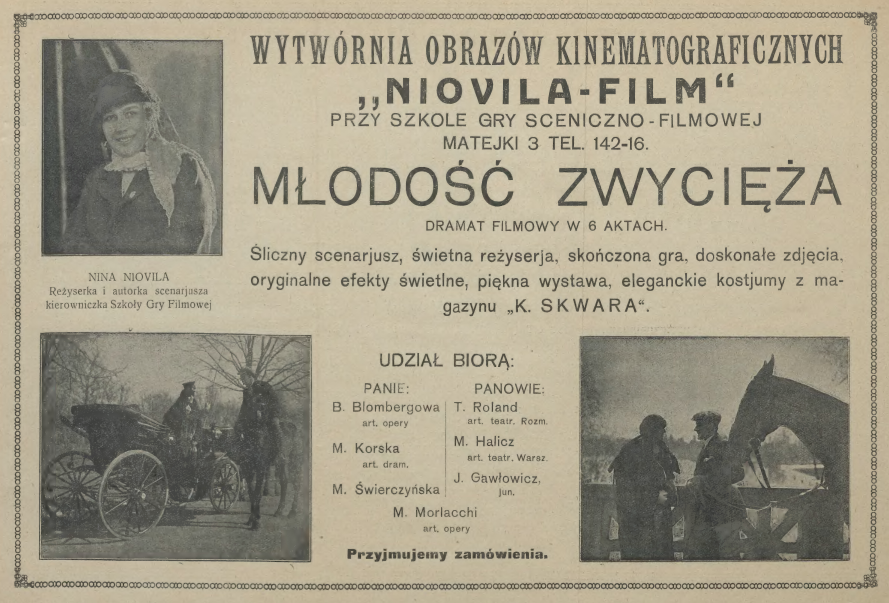
Advertisement for Młodość zwycięża

=== Filmography ===
- 1918: Die Heiratsannonce
- 1919: Tamara (also: Obrońcy Lwowa)
- 1920: Czaty
- 1921: Idziem do ciebie, Polsko, matko nasza
- 1921: Z dni grozy
- 1923: Młodość zwycięża
- 1929: 9:25. Przygoda jednej nocy (acting), directed by Adam Augustynowicz and Ryszard Biske

=== Translations ===
==== Plays ====
- Matka i córka (staged: 1908); Gaston Armand de Caillavet, Robert de Flers
- Familijka (1916, 1935); Eugene Holtai
- Mandaryn Wu (1926, 1927); Harold Owen, Harry Maurice Vernon
- Pociąg widmo (1926, 1928, 1956); Arnold Ridley
- Nieuchwytny (1928, 1933); Edgar Wallace
- Koniec pani Cheyney (1929); Frederick Lonsdale
- Niebieski lis (1930); Ferenc Herczeg
- Burza w domu panien (1941); Alex Breidhal

==== Novels ====
- 1939: Yang i Yin, Alice Tisdale Hobart; Warsaw: Towarzystwo Wydawnicze „Rój”
