= The Adventures of Anton =

- Directed by: Wiktor Biegański
- Written by: Wiktor Biegański
- Starring: Antoni Siemaszko; Wanda Jarszewska
- Cinematography: Rajmund Czerny
- Release date: 1913
- Country: Poland
- Languages: Silent; Polish intertitles

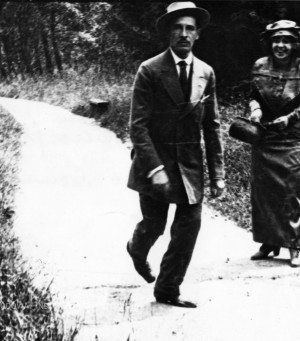
A still from the film

The Adventures of Anton (Polish:Przygody pana Antoniego) is a 1913 Polish silent comedy film directed by Wiktor Biegański and starring Antoni Siemaszko and Wanda Jarszewska. It is likely that the film and Biegański's previous production were never put on general release.

== Cast ==
- Antoni Siemaszko as Antoni
- Wanda Jarszewska

== Bibliography ==
- Skaff, Sheila. The Law of the Looking Glass: Cinema in Poland, 1896–1939. Ohio University Press, 2008.
