= Krystyna Ankwicz =

Polish actress (1907–1985)

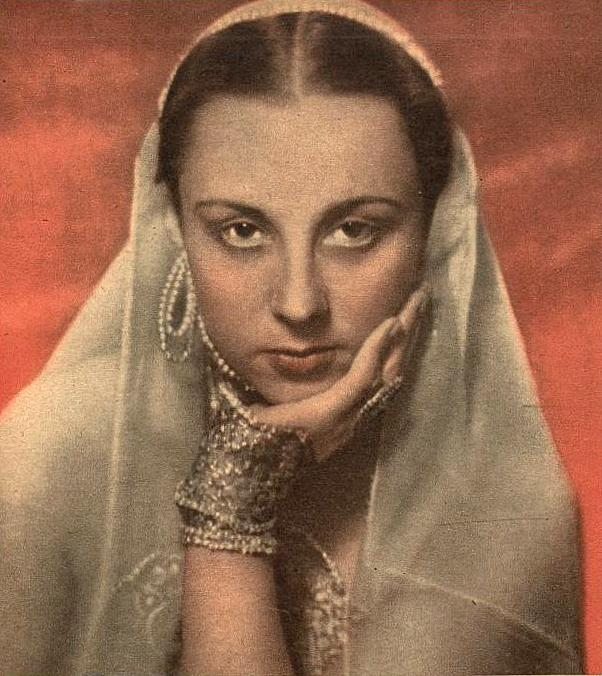
- Krystyna Ankwicz in Maskarada, 1939
- Born: Krystyna Szyjkowska; 4 April 1907; Lemberg, Galicia, Austria-Hungary (now Lviv, Ukraine)
- Died: 6 August 1985 (aged 78); Warsaw, Poland
- Other name: Monika de Witt
- Occupation: Actress
- Years active: 1929-1936

Krystyna Ankwicz (4 April 1907 – 6 August 1985) was a Polish film actress.

== Selected filmography ==
- Kult ciała (1930)
- Uwiedziona (1931)
- Sto metrów miłości (1932)
- Bohaterowie Sybiru (1936)
