= Wiktor Biegański =

Polish actor

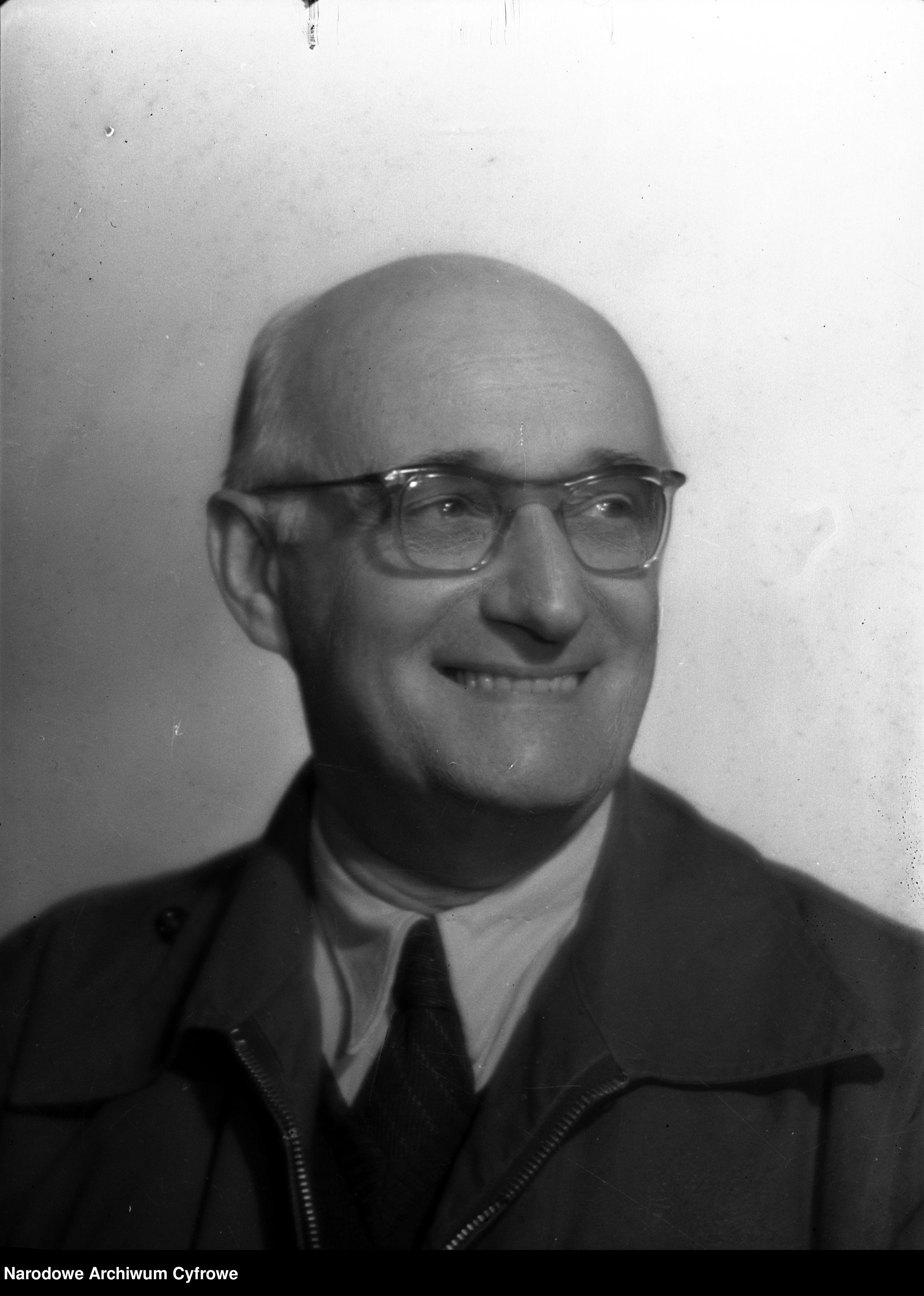
- Born: 16 November 1892; Sambor, Austria-Hungary (now Sambir, Ukraine)
- Died: 19 January 1974 (aged 81); Warsaw, Poland
- Occupations: Actor, film director, screenwriter
- Years active: 1919-1966

Wiktor Julian Biegański (16 November 1892 – 19 January 1974) was a Polish actor, film director and screenwriter. He appeared in 24 films between 1919 and 1966. He also directed eleven films between 1921 and 1929.

== Selected filmography ==
=== Actor ===
- The Drama of the St. Mary's Church Tower (1913)
- Charlotte Corday (1919)
- Bezimienni bohaterowie (1932)
- Dvanáct křesel (1933)
- His Excellency, The Shop Assistant (1933)
- Zabawka (1933)
- Młody Las (1934)
- Co mój mąż robi w nocy (1934)
- Pieśniarz Warszawy (1934)
- Jaśnie pan szofer (1935)

=== Director ===
- The Drama of the St. Mary's Church Tower (1913)
- The Adventures of Anton (1913)
- Pan Twardowski (1921)
- Jealousy (1922)
- The Abyss of Repentance (1923)
- The Idol (1923)
- Vampires of Warsaw (1925)
- The Little Eagle (1923)
- The Polish Marathon (1927)
- Pawns of Passion (1928)
- The Woman Who Desires Sin (1929)
