= Marek Haltof =

Professor of film studies (born 1957)

Marek Haltof (Józef Marek Haltof, born 1957 in Cieszyn, Poland,) is a professor of film studies. specializing in the cultural histories of Polish and Australian film.

He studied at the University of Silesia (Uniwersytet Śląski) in Poland and at Flinders University of South Australia in Adelaide. He received his Ph.D. degree in 1995 from the University of Alberta with a Ph.D. dissertation When Cultures Collide: The Cinema of Peter Weir. He received his habilitation in 2001 for Autor i kino artystyczne. Przypadek Paula Coxa (Author and Art Cinema: The Case of Paul Cox) from the Jagiellonian University in Kraków.

For several years he has taught at universities in Canada, including the University of Alberta and the University of Calgary, and since 2001 he is a professor at Northern Michigan University in Marquette, Michigan. He is the recipient of several grants and awards, including the 2012 Choice Award for Outstanding Academic Book in Film Studies for his Polish Film and the Holocaust: Politics and Memory (2012. In 2018 he was honored for Excellence in Scholarship at NMU.

Haltof established himself as one of the leading voices on Polish cinema. Film critic Michał Oleszczyk writes that Haltof is one of the two Polish-born scholars leading the field of Polish films studies outside Poland (with the other one being Ewa Mazierska). According to Oleszczyk, Haltof's Polish Cinema: A History (2019) is a "comprehensive, reliable" and "groundbreaking work," which "delivers rich, basic information in ways that are both enjoyable and intelligible for foreign readers." The same critic describes Haltof's Screening Auschwitz (2018) as "one of the finest single film monographs on the subject of Polish film - and perhaps one of the finest monographs on any significant work of cinema." Screening Auschwitz received the 2019 Waclaw Lednicki Humanities Award from the Polish Institute of Arts and Sciences of America.

== Books ==
- Polish Cinema: A History. Berghahn Books, 2019. ISBN 978-1785339721 A revised, updated, and expanded version of the 2002 book, which, as film critic Michał Oleszczyk wrote, "has become a staple in English-language teaching of Polish film".
- Screening Auschwitz: Wanda Jakubowska's The Last Stage and the Politics of Commemoration. Northwestern University Press, 2018. ISBN 978-0810136106.
- Historical Dictionary of Polish Cinema: Second Edition, Rowman and Littlefield, 2014. ASIN: B00T9911N8
- Polish Film and the Holocaust: Politics and Memory, Berghahn Books, 2012. ISBN 978-0857453563.
  - The book provides a comprehensive survey of Polish Holocaust films, which uses, in part, archival materials that clarify production and reception contexts. It covers 46 feature films and 68 documentaries, shorts and TV films, although misses some important ones (which were released during the preparation of the book). Magdalena Saryusz-Wolska remarks that the book is obviously not directed to Polish readers, because most of the covered issues may be found in Polish literature. Probably for this reason the author packed the book with a large number of films sacrificing the amount of individual coverage.
- The A to Z of Polish Cinema. Scarecrow Press, 2010. ISBN 978-0810876170.
- Historical Dictionary of Polish Cinema, Scarecrow Press, 2007. ISBN 978-0-8108-5566-3
- Kino australijskie. O ekranowej konstrukcji Antypodów (The Cinema of Australia: On the Screen Construction of Australia). słowo/obraz terytoria, 2005. ISBN 83-7453-670-5.
- The Cinema of Krzysztof Kieślowski: Variations on Destiny and Chance, Wallflower Press/Columbia University Press, 2004. ISBN 978-1903364925. Translated into Czech, Japanese, and Chinese.
- New Polish Cinema, Flicks Books, 2003. Co-editor with Janina Falkowska. ISBN 978-1862360020
- Polish National Cinema, Berghahn Books, 2002. ISBN 978-1571812759. The book was translated into Chinese (2011), Japanese (2006), and Polish (2004).
- Autor i kino artystyczne. Przypadek Paula Coxa (Author and Art Cinema: The Case of Paul Cox). Rabid, 2001. ISBN 978-83-88668-11-1.
- Kino Australii: o ekranowej konstrukcji Australii (Australian Cinema: The Screen Construction of Australia). PWSFTviT (Lodz Film School Press), 1996. ISBN 83-900788-8-0.
- Peter Weir: When Cultures Collide. Twayne Publishers, 1996. ISBN 0-8057-7843-8.
- Duo Nowak, 1996, a novel in Polish. ISBN 83-7164-013-7
- Kino lęków (The Cinema of Fears), Szumacher, 1992. ISBN 83-900332-7-5, a collection of essays
- Maks jest wielki (Max is Great), 1988, a novel in Polish. ISBN 83-216-0654-7
