= Przebudzenie =

1934 Polish drama film

- Directed by: Aleksander Ford; Jan Nowina-Przybylski
- Written by: Olga Fordowa; Napoleon Sądek
- Starring: Zofia Nakoneczna; Bazyli Sikiewicz; Igo Sym
- Cinematography: Stanisław Wohl
- Edited by: Seweryn Steinwurzel
- Music by: Simon Laks
- Production company: Palladium
- Release date: April 18, 1934 (Poland)
- Country: Poland
- Language: Polish

Przebudzenie (English: Awakening) is a 1934 Polish drama film directed by Aleksander Ford, based on a screenplay by Olga Fordowa. The film follows the struggles of a young high school graduate (Zofia Nakoneczna) employed as a governess by a wealthy Warsaw family. She falls in love with a mechanic, who is wrongly accused of theft, leading to his arrest and her dismissal. In a dream sequence, the heroine envisions the injustices faced by her and her beloved. Upon waking, she observes workers marching upward, symbolizing hope for a better future for the lower classes.

Created by members of the avant-garde film community, Przebudzenie addresses social inequalities and systemic flaws. Production faced challenges, including financial dependence on a Radom cinema owner and strict censorship requirements. The film was poorly received by audiences and critics, who criticized its lack of narrative coherence, heavy-handed symbolism, chaotic editing, and poor cinematography and sound. In 1935, a re-edited version directed by Jan Nowina-Przybylski, titled Miłość maturzystki (Love of a Graduate), was screened in provincial cinemas. The film is considered lost.

== Plot ==
Three high school graduates enter adulthood. The first becomes a doctor but contracts tuberculosis and dies. The second pursues an acting career, facing degradation. The third, the film's protagonist, arrives in Warsaw seeking employment and becomes a governess for a materialistic bourgeois family. Courted by a music teacher (Igo Sym), she rejects him, falling in love with a poor car mechanic (Bazyli Sikiewicz). When her employers' home is robbed, the mechanic, attempting to stop the thieves, is falsely arrested, and the governess is dismissed for alleged complicity. In a dream, she sees the injustices inflicted by her former employers and a ruthless prosecutor. Awakened by a factory siren, she watches workers marching upward, symbolizing a hopeful future for the working class.

== Cast ==
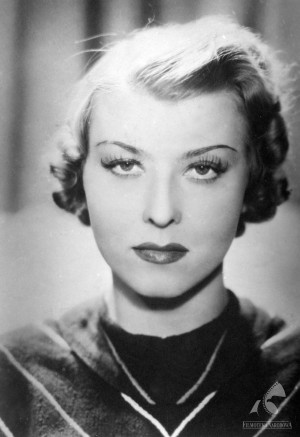
Zofia Nakoneczna, who played the lead role of the young graduate

- Zofia Nakoneczna as the young graduate
- Bazyli Sikiewicz as the mechanic
- Igo Sym as the music teacher
- Stefan Jaracz as a drunkard from the "circus"
- Aleksander Zelwerowicz as Płoński
- Janina Macherska as Płońska
- Kazimierz Junosza-Stępowski
- Władysław Walter
- Stanisław Sielański
- Jerzy Kobusz
- Rita Lorma
- Lola Dorcy
- Lidia Goebel
- Zygmunt Chmielewski
- Helena Zarembina
- Janek Alter
- Tadeusz Ordeyg
- Ewa Kołogórska
- Nina Hal
- Janina Krzymuska
- Zofia Mrozowicz
- Wołodia Jastrzębiec

== Production ==
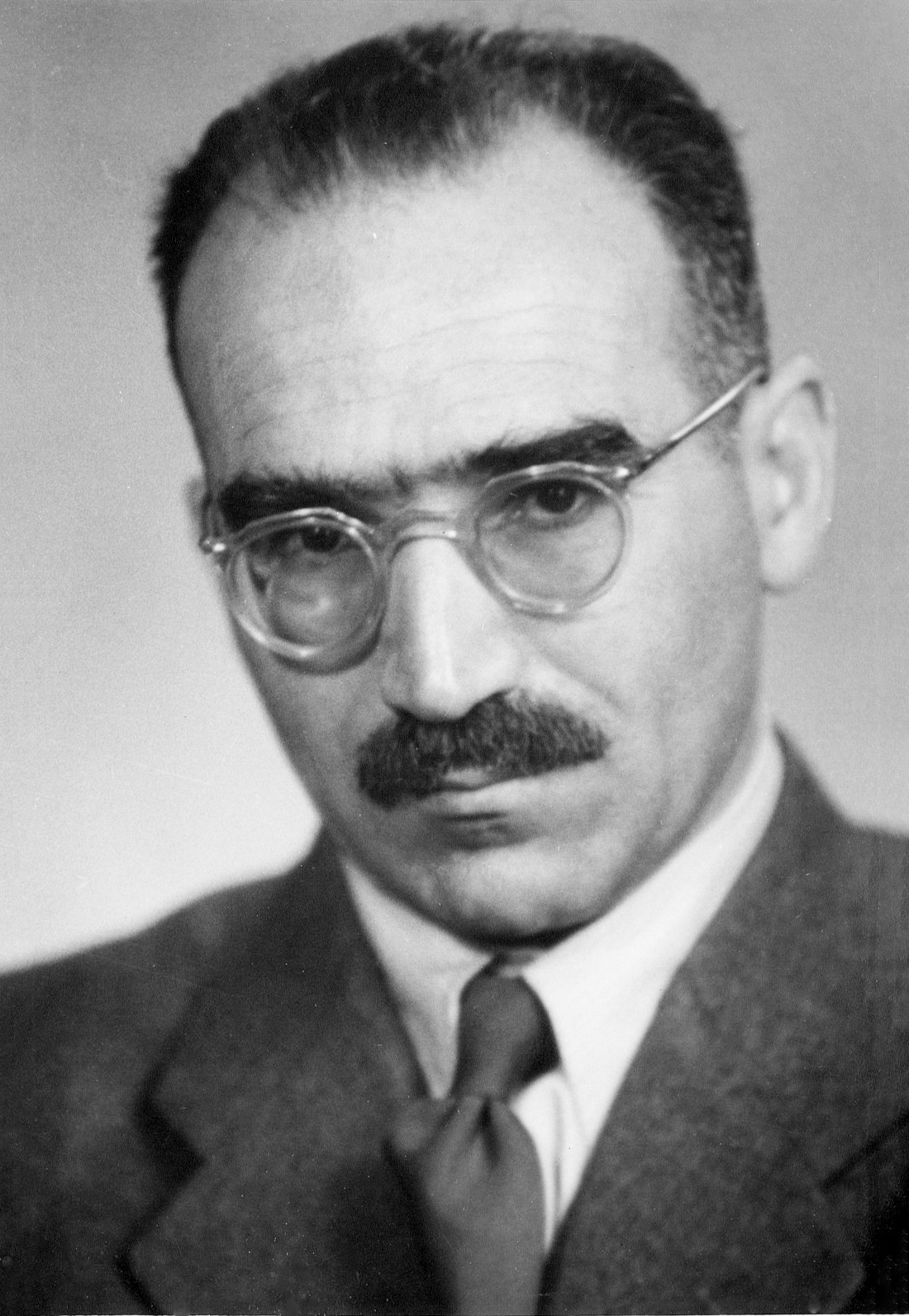
Aleksander Ford, director of the film

According to Ford's biographer Stanisław Janicki, funding for Ford's fourth feature film came from a Radom cinema owner. Ford aimed to focus on social issues. He described his vision:

Przebudzenie will be a social drama depicting the life of a young girl emerging from the sheltered world of home and school into reality. Her graduation marks an awakening from rosy, unrealistic dreams to a new, unknown, and threatening world… I sought to give my film a deeper social character, setting the action in both opulent salons and abject poverty… I aim to break from convention, not as an avant-garde experiment, but by building on existing achievements, adding truly new elements.

As in his debut feature Mascotte (1930), Ford used melodrama to veil critiques of the system, contrasting the bourgeoisie and proletariat, glorifying labor, and condemning systemic poverty and injustice.

Ford collaborated with members of the "Start" Artistic Film Enthusiasts Association, including Olga Fordowa (screenplay), Wanda Jakubowska (artistic director), Kazimierz Haltrecht and Aleksander Minorski (assistant directors), and Stanisław Wohl (cinematographer). Ludwik Perski also contributed. Non-avant-garde contributors included Simon Laks (music), Jacek Weinreich and W. Golińska (set design), and Julian Tuwim, who wrote the song Alkoholik.

Zofia Nakoneczna, a theater actress since 1930, debuted on film after being spotted by Ford's assistant during a rehearsal. Bazyli Sikiewicz played her love interest, with supporting roles by Igo Sym, Stefan Jaracz, Aleksander Zelwerowicz, Janina Macherska, Kazimierz Junosza-Stępowski, and Władysław Walter.

Production was tense. The Radom financier pushed to minimize costs and rushed filming, demanding completion in three days at D'Alben Studio at 42 Wolska Street, Warsaw. He halted work prematurely, forcing editing from existing footage. Censorship further altered Ford's vision.

== Release and reception ==
=== Theatrical release ===
Przebudzenie premiered on 8 April 1934 at Warsaw's Casino Theatre. It ran for two weeks due to audience dissatisfaction, with the premiere met with boos and stomping. Ford noted: "The film had to be made differently than envisioned, as the issue I aimed to address couldn't fit within my constraints. I faced countless obstacles, impossible to overcome".

=== Critical reception ===
Przebudzenie received negative reviews in outlets like Wiadomości Literackie, Kino, ABC, Kurier Polski, Kurier Warszawski, and Wieczór Warszawski. Critics, expecting more from Ford after his acclaimed Legion ulicy (1932), were disappointed by the film's artistic and social ambitions. Jerzy Toeplitz and Stefania Zahorska found its failure more frustrating than that of mass-produced comedy films or farces.

Reviewers criticized Ford's lack of focus, self-criticism, and concise storytelling. Toeplitz wrote: "To express a clear opinion, one must restrain temperament, avoid verbosity, summarize clearly, and avoid logical and grammatical errors". The film's excessive allegories and symbols, inspired by Soviet cinema, created confusion. A convoluted script and sloppy editing, with abrupt scene transitions, produced a "chaotic jumble of images and scenes, irritating with cheap symbols (trampled ‘whiteness', burning candles under bridges) and reformist jargon".

Critics from Wiadomości Literackie and Dekada noted distorted social truths and clumsy handling of class disparity, unemployment, and homelessness. Zahorska accused the filmmakers of plagiarism, citing uncredited use of scenes from Dziga Vertov's Soviet film Enthusiasm (1931). Poor sound and Stanisław Wohl's cinematography (save for a few strong shots) were also criticized.

Zahorska defended Ford: "It's particularly sad that this bitter Awakening came from his hand. But there's something beyond his personal fault. The paradox lies in conflicting interests, dependence on fleeting capital, or its absence. In wild, unhealthy haste, any significant intent gets lost or muddied. Ford may not be entirely to blame. He simply succumbed to the pressure". Teodor Braude of Dekada praised Ford's attempt to address contemporary issues despite the flaws.

Andrzej Ruszkowski called Zofia Nakoneczna's debut promising, though poorly filmed. Bazyli Sikiewicz fared worse. Performances by Aleksander Zelwerowicz, Stefan Jaracz, Igo Sym, Władysław Walter, Janina Macherska, and Kazimierz Junosza-Stępowski were praised. Child actress Ewa Kołogórska received high marks.

== Legacy ==
In 1935, Jan Nowina-Przybylski (director), Napoleon Sądek (writer), and Seweryn Steinwurzel (editor) re-edited the film, adding new scenes to recoup financial losses. Titled Miłość maturzystki (Love of a Graduate), it screened in provincial cinemas.

The National Film Archive considers Przebudzenie a lost film.
