= Legion ulicy =

1932 Polish drama film

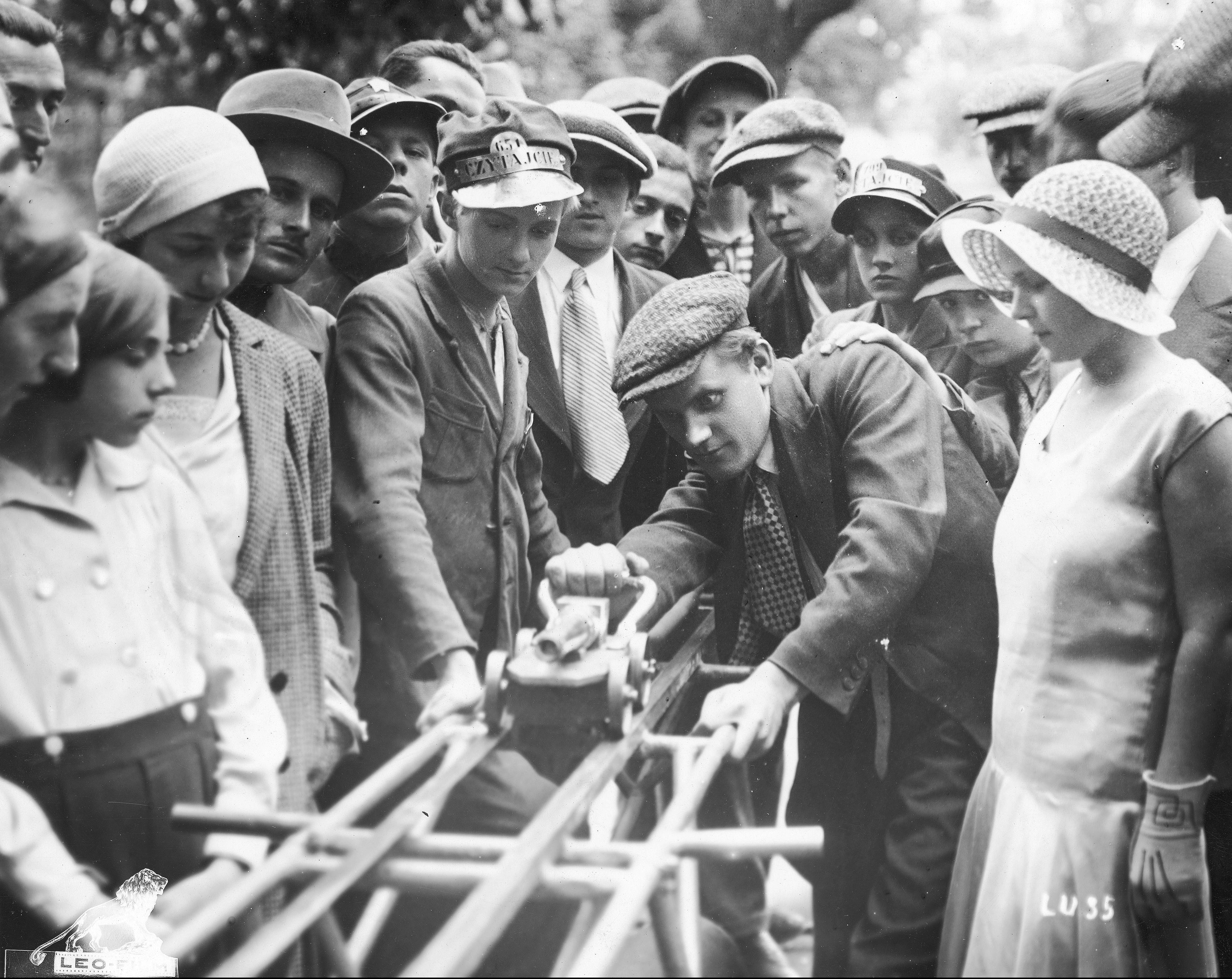
- Frame from the film
- Directed by: Aleksander Ford
- Written by: Maksymilian Emmer; Andrzej Wolica
- Starring: Tadeusz Fijewski; Maria Korska; Stefan Rogulski; Zofia Mirska; Zofia Słowińska; Jerzy Kobusz
- Cinematography: Seweryn Steinwurzel; Jerzy Maliniak
- Music by: Szymon Kataszek; Tadeusz Górzyński
- Production company: Leo-Film
- Release date: 18 March 1932 (Poland)
- Country: Poland
- Language: Polish

Legion ulicy (The Street Legion) is a Polish black-and-white drama film from 1932 directed by Aleksander Ford, based on a screenplay by Maksymilian Emmer and Andrzej Wolica. The production depicts the story of a teenage boy named Józek. The boy takes a job as a newsboy to help his mother, who has been injured in an accident.

Unlike most Polish productions of the time, which rejected realism and everyday life, Aleksander Ford tackled a theme close to life and Polish reality. The subject matter and innovative filmmaking methods brought Legion ulicy positive reviews from critics and enthusiastic reception from the audience. Copies of the film were lost during World War II.

== Plot ==
A teenage boy named Józek, living in Warsaw, must become self-sufficient when his mother, a seamstress, has an accident and is hospitalized. Losing their home and means of living, Józek decides to follow the advice of his friend Władek and joins "The Street Legion" – a group of boys delivering newspapers. He learns about their troubles and hardships, and through hard work, he earns the respect of his peers. At the same time, he develops a romantic relationship with Jaśka. However, his earnings are not enough to cover his mother's surgery and medical care, so he aspires to become a bicycle newspaper delivery boy. To acquire the needed bicycle, he participates in a street cycling race, with a bicycle as the main prize. He wins the competition.

== Cast ==
- Zofia Mirska – Jaśka
- Stefan Rogulski – Józek
- Tadeusz Fijewski – Władek
- Maria Korska
- Zofia Słowińska
- Jerzy Kobusz
- Hanna Sajowna
- J. Baill

== Production ==
Aleksander Ford became interested in the daily lives of newspaper boys, this "nameless 'the street legion', an atypical product of a big city", during the production of the short film Narodziny i życie gazety (1930). The Leo-Film studio, led by Maria Hirszbein, agreed to produce Legion ulicy due to the project's low costs. However, the studio was taking a risk, as the young director had yet to establish his name, the theme and plot of the film were radically different from previous Polish productions, and there were no prominent stars in the cast.

The screenplay for Legion ulicy was written by Maksymilian Emmer and Andrzej Wolica, who collaborated closely with Aleksander Ford on its creation. According to Leszek Armatys, the idea for the film's plot "gravitated towards a sentimental street ballad. Rather optimistic, closer to the simplicity of positivist urban scenes than to the authentic folk culture of street poetry". In this straightforward story, the creators referred to Polish reality and real life, and they presented in a moralizing way "the solidarity and friendship of proletarian children", discussing "the nobility of people capable of extending a hand to those in need".

Aleksander Ford made several directorial decisions that distinguished Legion ulicy from Polish films produced in the late 1920s and early 1930s. He abandoned the use of studios for authentic street settings and natural interiors, observing life in real time. He limited the casting of professional actors, especially well-known ones, opting instead for non-professional performers. Additionally, he paid close attention to editing, introducing thoughtful composition – reducing dialogue (for example, the conversation in the nearly ten-minute scene of Józek and Jaśka meeting on Kamienne Schodki was minimized). He "enriched the internal montage, introduced a counterpoint of image and sound (e.g., the sounds of the hospital where the protagonist's mother was being operated accompanied the cycling race scene)". The director also utilized natural sounds to emphasize the drama of the action. These elements resembled the principles of Italian neorealism and the poetics of cinéma vérité that emerged after World War II.

The film featured the tango Nie igraj z ogniem by Tadeusz Górzyński with lyrics by Stanisław Mara, as well as the tango Raz, dwa, trzy by Szymon Kataszek with lyrics by Jan Brzechwa.

== Premiere, reception, and awards ==
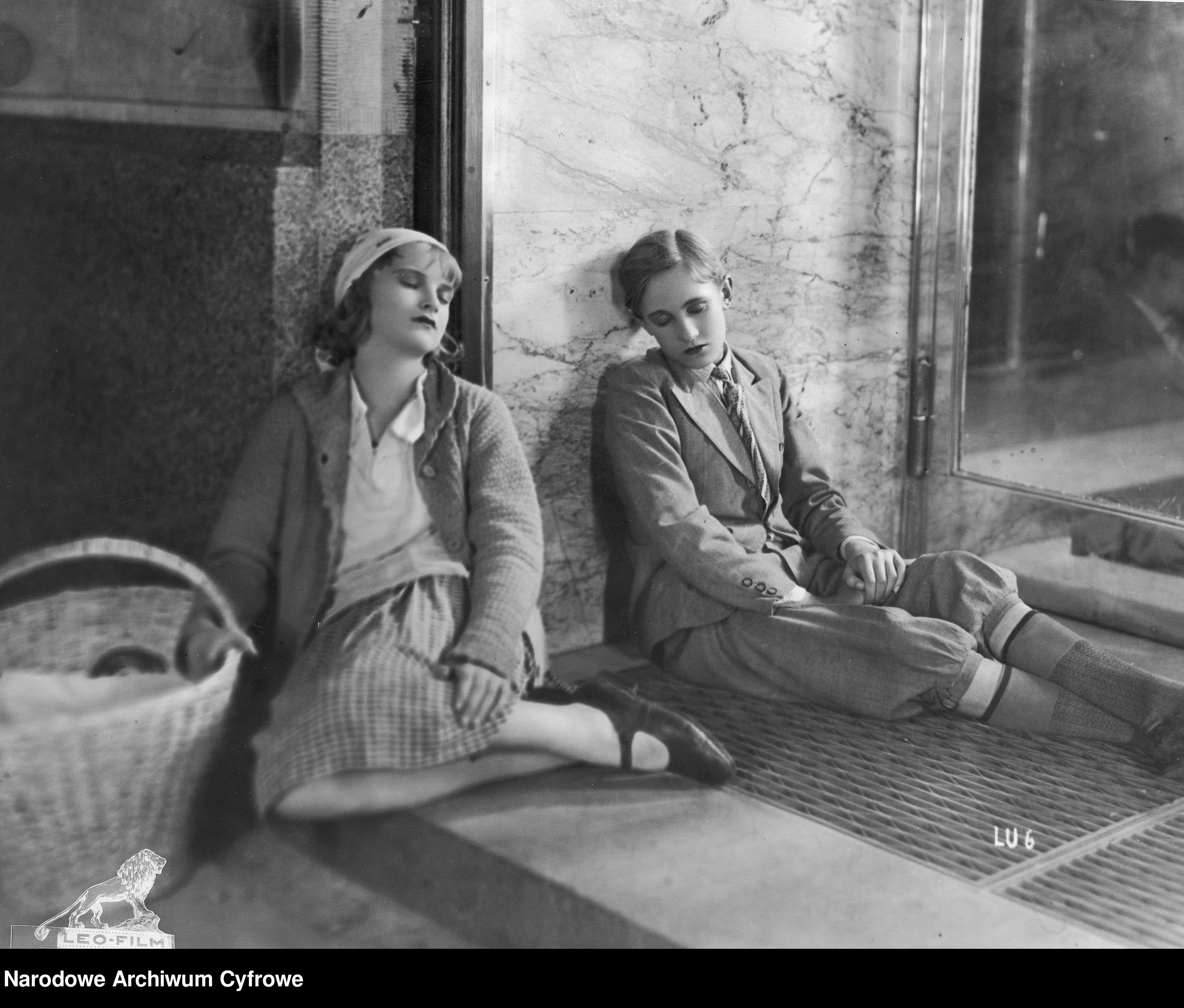
Zofia Mirska as Jaśka and Stefan Rogulski as Józek in one of the scenes from the film

Legion ulicy premiered on 18 March 1932 at the Stylowy cinema in Warsaw and was met with enthusiastic reviews from critics and a warm reception from the public.

In their initial comments, critics highlighted the significance of Legion ulicy against the backdrop of contemporary Polish cinema. Stefania Heymanowa wrote in Kino that, firstly, this production became a true film, combining elements of "movement, visual perception of the phenomenon, interesting photographic shots, montage", and thus moving away from simply adapting literature to the screen and photographing theater. Secondly, Ford abandoned popular themes like romance and patriotism in favor of presenting a simple story about life in an emotional and artistic way. Other reviewers noted that Legion ulicy avoided clichés, and the creators took a major step by applying a documentary technique and breaking away from the so-called star system. The film was recommended for children and youth.

Journalists also praised the technical aspects of Ford's work. According to Stefania Zahorska, the plot was not overly dramatized, but the depiction of the daily life of newspaper boys enriched the story. She also appreciated the "excellent editing, conducting the action through rhythm and scene arrangement", which was due to the director's skills. Jerzy Toeplitz of Kurier Polski noted the break from the typical love triangle (he, she, and the third person). He also pointed out some flaws, such as unclear symbolism (a tree in the desert) and moments where the synchronization of voice and image was off. On the positive side, he praised the cinematography by Seweryn Steinwurzel and Jerzy Maliniak.

Critics spoke favorably about the acting, particularly the performances of the main characters and the young extras. In Kurier Warszawski, it was written that the "leading trio, consisting of Stefek Rogulski, Tadek Fijewski – who had already appeared on screen before – and the sweet Zosia Mirska, performed their roles excellently, surrounded by a large group of real newspaper boys, portraying their roles with the sincerity and emotion that only children can achieve". A critic from the ABC newspaper praised Maria Korska’s portrayal of the mother and Jerzy Kobusz’s role as the newspaper delivery boy. However, Jerzy Toeplitz opined that the "adults" performed the weakest.

Legion ulicy won the gold medal for Best Film of 1932, awarded by the readers of the weekly Kino. One of the voters commented that the film was enjoyable "because it didn’t feature Cossacks and Polish uhlans, nor human traffickers, nor a manor with a 'sweet young lady', nor a vampire". The film topped the poll in ABC newspaper and appeared in the top rankings in Express Poranny's March survey of the best films shown in Warsaw cinemas, alongside À Nous la Liberté by René Clair and Shanghai Express by Josef von Sternberg. Thanks to the film’s success, Aleksander Ford ranked among the top five most popular Polish directors in a vote by Wiadomości Literackie, earning the title of a "truly cinematic" creator. Ryszard Ordyński, Michał Waszyński, Henryk Szaro, and Mieczysław Krawicz also held high positions in the rankings.

== Bibliography ==
- Armatys, L.; Stradomski, W. (1988). Od "Niewolnicy zmysłów" do "Czarnych diamentów". Szkice o polskich filmach z lat 1914–1939 [From "The Slave of the Senses" to "Black Diamonds": Sketches on Polish Films from 1914 to 1939] (in Polish). Warsaw: Centralny Ośrodek Metodyki Upowszechniania Kultury. ISBN 83-7010-049-X.
- Janicki, Stanisław (1967). Aleksander Ford (in Polish). Warsaw: Wydawnictwa Artystyczne i Filmowe.
- Toeplitz, Jerzy (1959). Historia sztuki filmowej [History of Film Art] (in Polish). Vol. III. Warsaw: Wydawnictwa Artystyczne i Filmowe.
- Armatys, L.; Armatys, B.; Stradomski, W. (1988). Historia filmu polskiego [History of Polish Cinema] (in Polish). Warsaw: Wydawnictwa Artystyczne i Filmowe. ISBN 83-221-0368-9.
