= Seweryn Steinwurzel =

Polish cinematographer

- Born: 18 January 1898; Warsaw, Poland, Russian Empire
- Died: 27 December 1983 (aged 85); Lod, Israel
- Occupation: Cinematographer
- Years active: 1923-1949 (film)

Seweryn Steinwurzel (1898–1983) was a Polish cinematographer. He was active during the Second Polish Republic beginning in the silent era. Of Jewish background, the film producer Leo Forbert was his cousin. He was married to the actress Nora Ney.

Following the Invasion of Poland in 1939 his career in the country ended. He worked as a filmmaker for the Polish Armed Forces in the West during the Italian campaign. Later in the decade he worked in Argentina and Brazil, before he later emigrated to Israel. He was one of a large number of filmmakers from pre-war Poland to flee into exile.

== Selected filmography ==
- Rivals (1925)
- The Call of the Sea (1927)
- The Final Touch (1928)
- Police Chief Tagiejew (1929)
- The Woman Who Desires Sin (1929)
- The Beauty of Life (1930)
- A Heart on the Street (1931)
- Bezimienni bohaterowie (1932)
- Legion ulicy (1932)
- Sound of the Desert (1932)
- Ten Percent for Me (1933)
- The Story of Sin (1933)
- Przebudzenie (1934)
- Córka generała Pankratowa (1934)
- Róża (1936)
- The Leper (1936)
- Barbara Radziwiłłówna (1936)
- Pan Twardowski (1936)
- Count Michorowski (1937)
- Neighbors (1937)
- The Girls from Nowolipki (1937)
- The Line (1938)
- Doctor Murek (1939)
- Krystyna's Lie (1939)
- Złota Maska (1940)

== Bibliography ==
- Ford, Charles & Hammond, Robert. Polish Film: A Twentieth Century History. McFarland, 2005.
- Haltof, Marek. Polish National Cinema. Berghahn Books, 2002.
- Skaff, Sheila. The Law of the Looking Glass: Cinema in Poland, 1896-1939. Ohio University Press, 2008.
