= A Heart on the Street =

1931 film

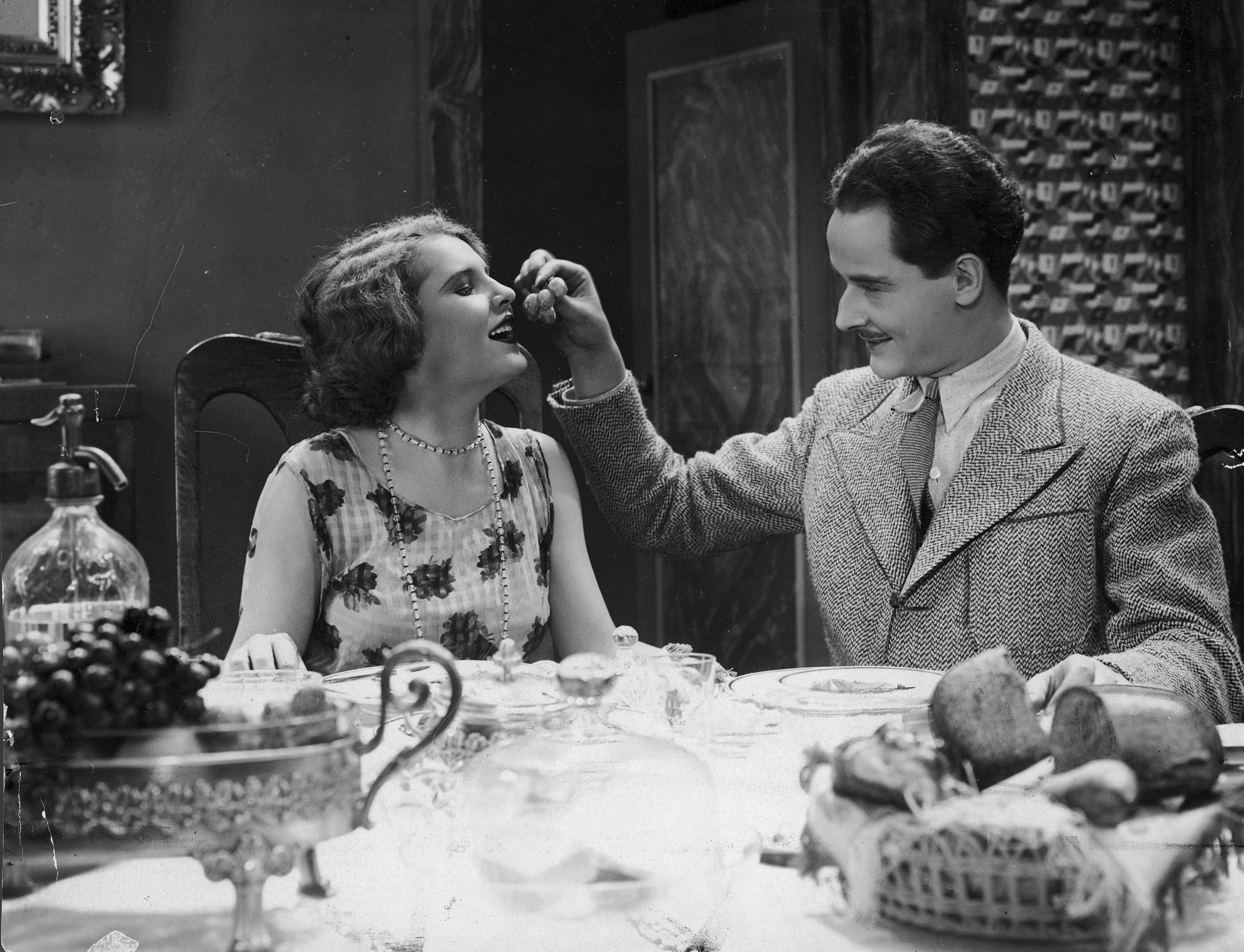
- Directed by: Juliusz Gardan
- Written by: Juliusz Gardan; Anatol Stern
- Based on: Novel by Stefan Kiedrzynski
- Starring: Nora Ney; Zbigniew Sawan; Ludwik Fritsche
- Cinematography: Seweryn Steinwurzel
- Music by: Szymon Kataszek
- Production company: Leo Film
- Release date: 5 February 1931
- Country: Poland
- Language: Polish

A Heart on the Street (Polish: Serce na ulicy) is a 1931 Polish romantic drama film directed by Juliusz Gardan and starring Nora Ney, Zbigniew Sawan and Ludwik Fritsche. The film's sets were designed by the art director Jacek Weinreich.

== Cast ==
- Nora Ney as Nadiezda
- Zbigniew Sawan as Henryk Barczynski
- Hanna Rozwadowska as Jadwiga Barczynska
- Ludwik Fritsche as General
- Maria Chaveau as Baroness
- Tom Breza
- Maria Modzelewska

== Bibliography ==
- Haltof, Marek. Historical Dictionary of Polish Cinema. Rowman & Littlefield Publishers, 2015.
- Skaff, Sheila. The History of Cinema in Poland and the Transition from Silent to Sound Film, 1896-1939. University of Michigan, 2004.
