= Juliusz Gardan =

Polish screenwriter and film director

- Born: 12 November 1901; Czestochowa, Poland, Russian Empire
- Died: 29 December 1944 (aged 43); Ashkhabad, Turkmenistan, Soviet Union
- Occupations: Director, screenwriter
- Years active: 1938–1939 (film)

Juliusz Gardan (1901–1944) was a Polish screenwriter and film director, one of the leading filmmakers of Second Polish Republic. After assisting director Henryk Szaro he moved into direction himself in 1928 and produced a number of popular hits during the 1930s. His career was halted by the outbreak of the Second World War and following the Soviet invasion of Poland as part of the Molotov-Ribbentrop Pact he was deported to the Soviet Union. He died in Ashkhabad in 1944.

== Filmography ==
=== Director ===
- The Final Touch (1928)
- Police Chief Tagiejew (1929)
- The Beauty of Life (1930)
- A Heart on the Street (1931)
- Ten Percent for Me (1933)
- Life Sentence (1933)
- Is Lucyna a Girl? (1934)
- The Leper (1936)
- Halka (1937)
- Miss Minister Is Dancing (1937)
- Heather (1938)
- Doktór Murek (1939)

=== Screenwriter ===
- The Final Touch (1928)
- The Beauty of Life (1930)
- A Heart on the Street (1931)
- Is Lucyna a Girl? (1934)
- The Leper (1936)
- Heather (1938)
- Doktór Murek (1939)

=== Art director ===
- Uhlan's Pledge (1934)
- Two Joasias (1935)

== Bibliography ==
- Haltof, Marek. Historical Dictionary of Polish Cinema. Rowman & Littlefield Publishers, 2015.
- Skaff, Sheila. The Law of the Looking Glass: Cinema in Poland, 1896-1939. Ohio University Press, 2008.
