= The Beauty of Life =

1930 film

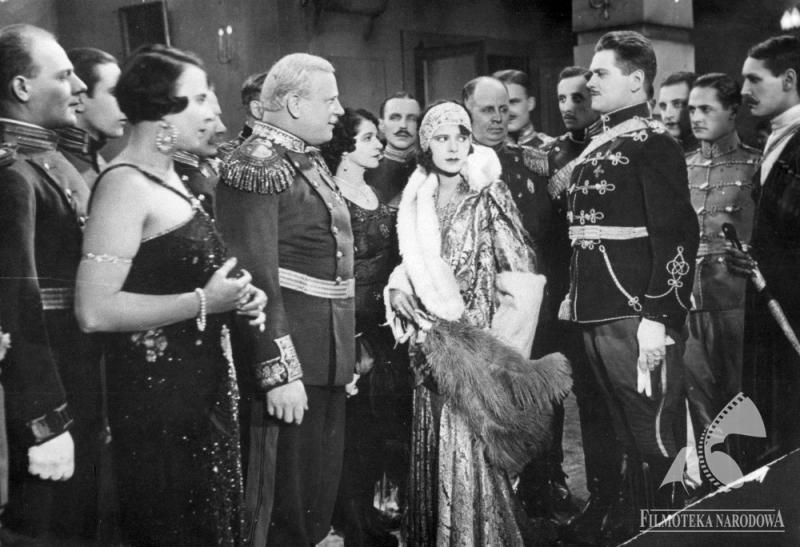
- Directed by: Juliusz Gardan
- Written by: Juliusz Gardan; Anatol Stern
- Based on: The Beauty of Life by Stefan Zeromski
- Starring: Adam Brodzisz; Boguslaw Samborski; Nora Ney
- Cinematography: Seweryn Steinwurzel
- Music by: Szymon Kataszek
- Production company: Leo Film
- Release date: 30 January 1930
- Country: Poland
- Languages: Silent; Polish intertitles

The Beauty of Life (Polish: Uroda zycia) is a 1930 Polish silent drama film directed by Juliusz Gardan and starring Adam Brodzisz, Boguslaw Samborski and Nora Ney. The film's sets were designed by the art director Stefan Norris. It is based on the 1912 novel of the same title by Stefan Zeromski.

== Cast ==
- Adam Brodzisz as Piotr Rozlucki
- Boguslaw Samborski as General Polenov
- Nora Ney as Tatjana Polenova
- Eugeniusz Bodo as Roszow
- Stefan Jaracz as Rozlucki, Piotr's father
- Wieslaw Gawlikowski as Uncle Michal
- Irena Dalma as Malgorzata Oscieciówna
- Ludwik Fritsche as General Polenov's kamerdyner
- Flora Kozakiewicz as Mademoiselle Mathilde
- Leonard Zajaczkowski as Ordynans Rozluckiego
- Tadeusz Fijewski as Schoolboy

== Bibliography ==
- Bren, Frank. World Cinema: Poland. Flicks Books, 1986.
- Skaff, Sheila. The History of Cinema in Poland and the Transition from Silent to Sound Film, 1896-1939. University of Michigan, 2004.
