= Córka generała Pankratowa =

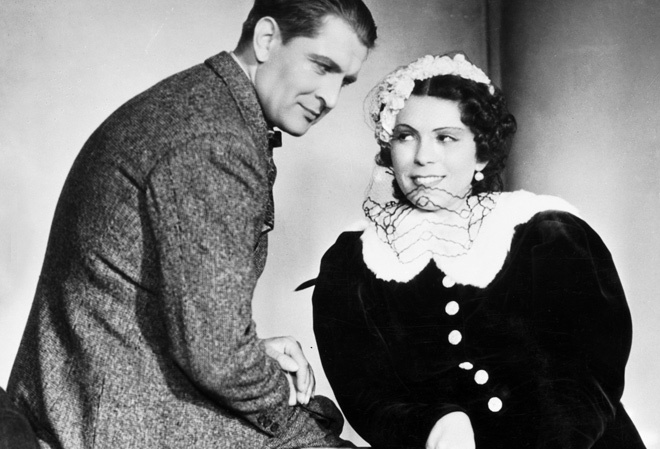
- Franciszek Brodniewicz and Nora Ney
- Directed by: Mieczysław Znamierowski; Józef Lejtes
- Written by: Marian Orlik
- Starring: Nora Ney; Franciszek Brodniewicz; Kazimierz Junosza-Stępowski
- Cinematography: Seweryn Steinwurzel
- Music by: Henryk Wars
- Release date: 1934
- Running time: 76 minutes
- Country: Poland
- Language: Polish

The General Pankratov's Daughter (Córka generała Pankratowa) is a Polish historical film directed by Mieczysław Znamierowski and written by Marian Orlik. It was released in 1934.

== Cast ==
- Nora Ney - Aniuta
- Franciszek Brodniewicz - Bolesław
- Kazimierz Junosza-Stępowski - general Pankratov
- Stanisław Grolicki - general-governor
- Aleksander Żabczyński - adjutant
- Mieczysław Cybulski - Alexey Voronov
- Zofia Lindorfówna - revolutionary
- Jerzy Leszczyński - count Bobrov
- Maria Bogda - revolutionary
- Zbigniew Ziembiński - revolutionary
- Stanisław Daniłłowicz - informant
- Helena Buczyńska - Aniuta's aunt
- Stanisława Perzanowska - owner of the apartment
- Zygmunt Chmielewski
- Stefania Górska
- Wanda Jarszewska
- Alina Żeliska
- Romuald Gierasieński
- Feliks Żukowski
- Zofia Terné
- Zofia Kajzerówna
- Ryszard Kierczyński
- Tadeusz Fijewski
- Henryk Rzętkowski
- Monica Carlo
- Rufin Morozowicz
