= Jaga Juno =

Polish actress (1900–1944)

- Born: 1900
- Died: 22 March 1944 (aged 43–44); Warsaw, German-occupied Poland
- Cause of death: Execution by shooting
- Occupation: Actress
- Years active: 1920s
- Relatives: Kazimierz Junosza-Stępowski (husband)

Jaga Juno (1900 – 22 March 1944) was a Polish actress. She was active in theatre and film in the early 1920s. During the German occupation of Poland, Juno was a Gestapo informant; in a raid by the Home Army in 1943, her husband Kazimierz Junosza-Stępowski was killed while trying to protect her. In March 1944, returning to her apartment after a period of refuge, she was shot and killed by Home Army members.

== Select filmography ==
- Tajemnica przystanku tramwajowego (1922)
