= Bohaterowie Sybiru =

1936 Polish drama film by Michał Waszyński

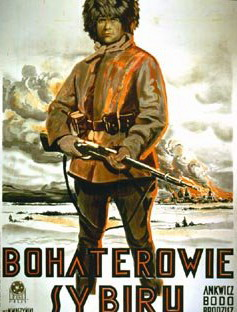
- Film poster
- Directed by: Michał Waszyński
- Written by: Eugeniusz Bodo, Jerzy Walden
- Music by: Henryk Wars
- Production company: Urania-Film
- Distributed by: Patria-Film
- Release date: 4 April 1936
- Running time: 93 min.
- Country: Poland
- Language: Polish

Bohaterowie Sybiru ("Heroes of Siberia") is a 1936 Polish black and white drama film directed by Michał Waszyński. It was preserved until modern times.

== Plot ==
In 1918, by the end of World War I a group of Polish POWs from the Austro-Hungarian Army, after leaning about the establishment of the independent Poland form a military detachment, which moves to join the Polish army. After their adventures amid the Russian Civil War they join the Polish 5th Rifle Division.

== Reception ==
The film review in Wiarus weekly (no.15, 1936) expressed a positive opinion. However Michał Sabatowicz (1895-1977) wrote that "unfortunately, it ended where its content should have started. It didn't evoke emotions from the viewers and left the screens. And yet it was a great opportunity to make this final tragedy of the Siberian wandering more vivid. Slavgorod, taiga, Klyukvennaya, Krasnoyarsk - mass graves - burials of hundreds of bodies in the moonlight - terrible nights and longing days, escapes, steppes, return to the fighting Poland and a rifle in hands again - this is a topic that would have captivated even this generation that is slowly getting to know us. However, the opportunity was not taken."

== Cast ==
- Adam Brodzisz ... Lieutenant (porucznik) Stefan Winiarski
- Eugeniusz Bodo ... soldier Władek
- Krystyna Ankwicz ... Janka, wife of the lieutenant, granddaughter of a Polish insurgent
- Kazimierz Junosza-Stępowski ... Imperial Russian Guards officer
- Lala Górska ... Lieutenant's daughter Zosia
- Jan Bonecki
- Feliks Chmurkowski ... Engineer Krysicki, volunteer
- Mieczysław Cybulski ... Roman Kłosewicz, Russian student
- Stanisław Daniłowicz ... Feliks Bochenek, a soldier who writes the memoir
- Ludwik Fritsche, grandpa Matuszewski, member of the January Uprising
- Stanisław Grolicki
- Stefan Hnydziński
- Eugeniusz Koszutski
- Jan Kurnakowicz ... Stiopa
- Żenia Magierówna
- Jerzy Roland
- Leon Wyrwicz, soldier Ziuńcio
