= Stanisława Wysocka =

Polish actress and theatre director

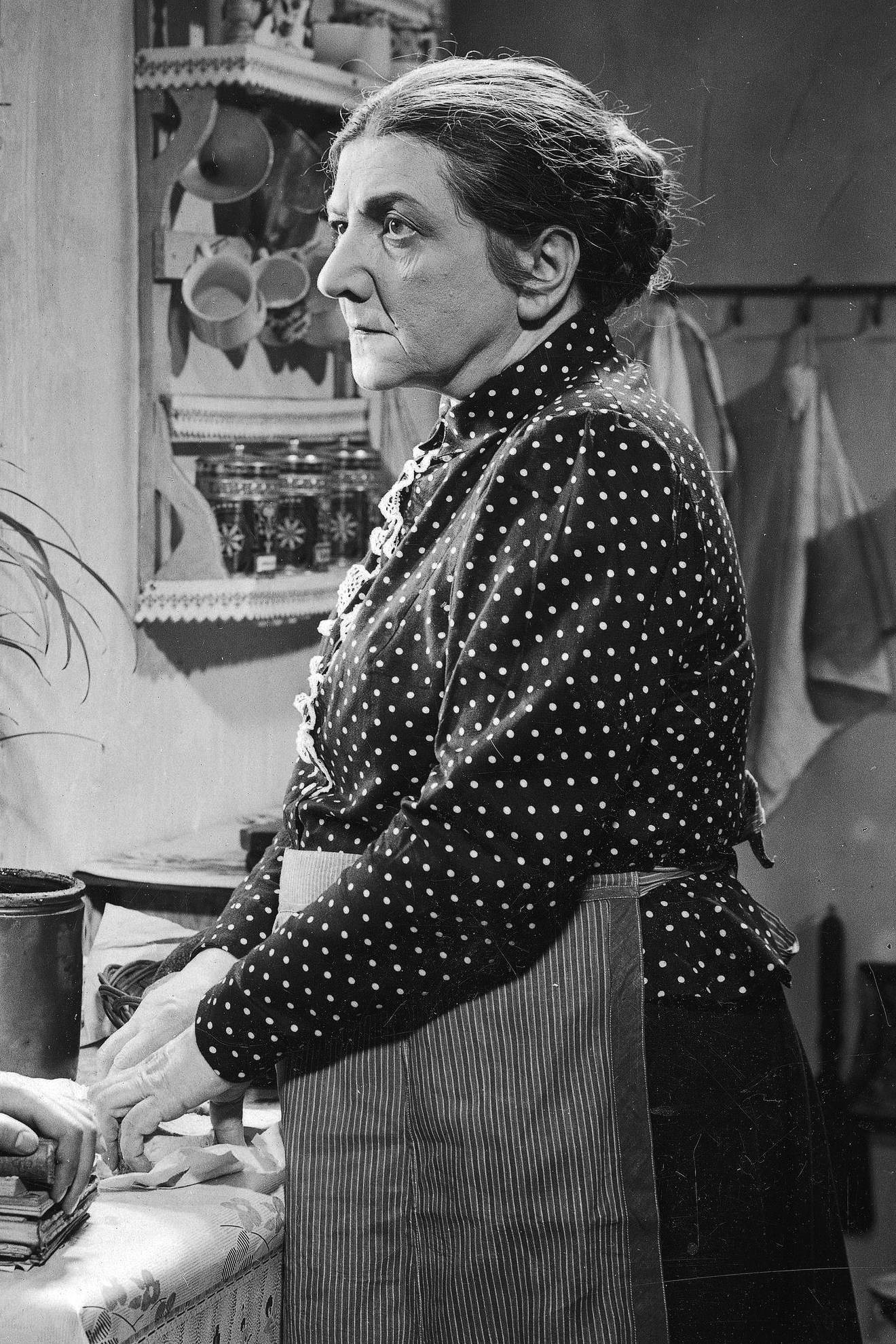
- Still of Wysocka from the film The Girls from Nowolipki, 1937
- Born: May 7, 1877; Warsaw, Warsaw Governorate, Congress Poland
- Died: January 17, 1941 (aged 63); Warschau, General Government
- Resting place: Rakowice Cemetery
- Other names: Wilska
- Occupation: Thespian
- Spouses: Kazimierz Wysocki; Grzegorz Stanisławski
- Children: Janina Wysocka-Ochlewska
- Awards: Order of Polonia Restituta; Cross of Merit; Academic Laurel

Stanisława Wysocka (1877–1941) was a Polish actress and theatre director. Teacher of Państwowy Instytut Sztuki Teatralnej.

== Filmography ==
- Ponad śnieg (1929)
- A Strong Man (1929)
- Jaśnie pan szofer (1935)
- The Leper (1936)
- The Girls from Nowolipki (1937)
- Second Youth (1938)
- Dziewczyna szuka miłości (1938)
- The Line (1938)
- Gehenna (1938)
- Heather (1938)
- Kobiety nad przepaścią (1938)
- Ludzie Wisły (1938)
- The Vagabonds (1939)
- Czarne diamenty (1939)
- O czym sie nie mówi... (1939)
- Nad Niemnem (1939)

== Bibliography ==
- Skaff, Sheila. The Law of the Looking Glass: Cinema in Poland, 1896-1939. Ohio University Press, 2008.
