= The Girls from Nowolipki =

1937 film

- Directed by: Joseph Lejtes
- Written by: Joseph Lejtes; Stanislaw Urbanowicz
- Based on: The Girls from Nowolipki by Pola Gojawiczynska
- Produced by: Alfred Niemirski
- Starring: Elzbieta Barszczewska; Jadwiga Andrzejewska; Tamara Wiszniewska
- Cinematography: Stanislaw Lipinski; Seweryn Steinwurzel
- Music by: Marian Neuteich; Roman Palester
- Production companies: Parlo Film; Rex-Film
- Distributed by: Parlo Film
- Release date: 26 October 1937
- Running time: 97 minutes
- Country: Poland
- Language: Polish

The Girls from Nowolipki (Polish: Dziewczeta z Nowolipek) is a 1937 Polish drama film directed by Joseph Lejtes and starring Elzbieta Barszczewska, Jadwiga Andrzejewska and Tamara Wiszniewska. It was shot at the Falanga Studios in Warsaw. The film's sets were designed by the art director Stefan Norris and Jacek Rotmil. It is based on the 1935 novel The Girls from Nowolipki by Pola Gojawiczynska, which was adapted into a 1985 film of the same title.

== Cast ==
- Elzbieta Barszczewska as Bronka Mossakowska
- Jadwiga Andrzejewska as Franka
- Tamara Wiszniewska as Amelka Raczynska
- Anna Jaraczówna as Kwiryna
- Stanislawa Wysocka as Mossakowska
- Mieczyslawa Cwiklinska as Raczynska
- Hanna Brzezinska as Manka
- Janina Janecka as Prymasiakowa
- Helena Buczynska as Franka's Mother
- Kazimierz Junosza-Stepowski as Mossakowski
- Tadeusz Bialoszczynski as Rózycki
- Stefan Hnydzinski as Michalowski
- Andrzej Szalawski as Ignas
- Józef Karbowski as Professor
- Wladyslaw Grabowski as Pharmacist
- Antoni Rózycki as Writer Szubow
- Kazimierz Pawlowski as Roman
- Wlodzimierz Lozinski as Mietek
- Saturnin Butkiewicz as Man Accompanying Rózycki
- Roman Deren as Man at the 'Akwarium' Club

== Bibliography ==
- Haltof, Marek. Historical Dictionary of Polish Cinema. Rowman & Littlefield Publishers, 2015.
- Skaff, Sheila. The Law of the Looking Glass: Cinema in Poland, 1896-1939. Ohio University Press, 2008.
