= Marian Neuteich =

Polish-Jewish composer, cellist and conductor

Marian Neuteich (29 May 1890 – c. 1943) was a Polish-Jewish composer, cellist and conductor.

During World War II, Neuteich was in the Warsaw Ghetto, where he was one of the conductors of the Jewish Symphony Orchestra. He was murdered in the Trawniki concentration camp.

== Selected filmography ==
- Róża (1936)
- The Girls from Nowolipki (1937)
- The Line (1938)
