= Franciszek Brodniewicz =

Polish actor (1892–1944)

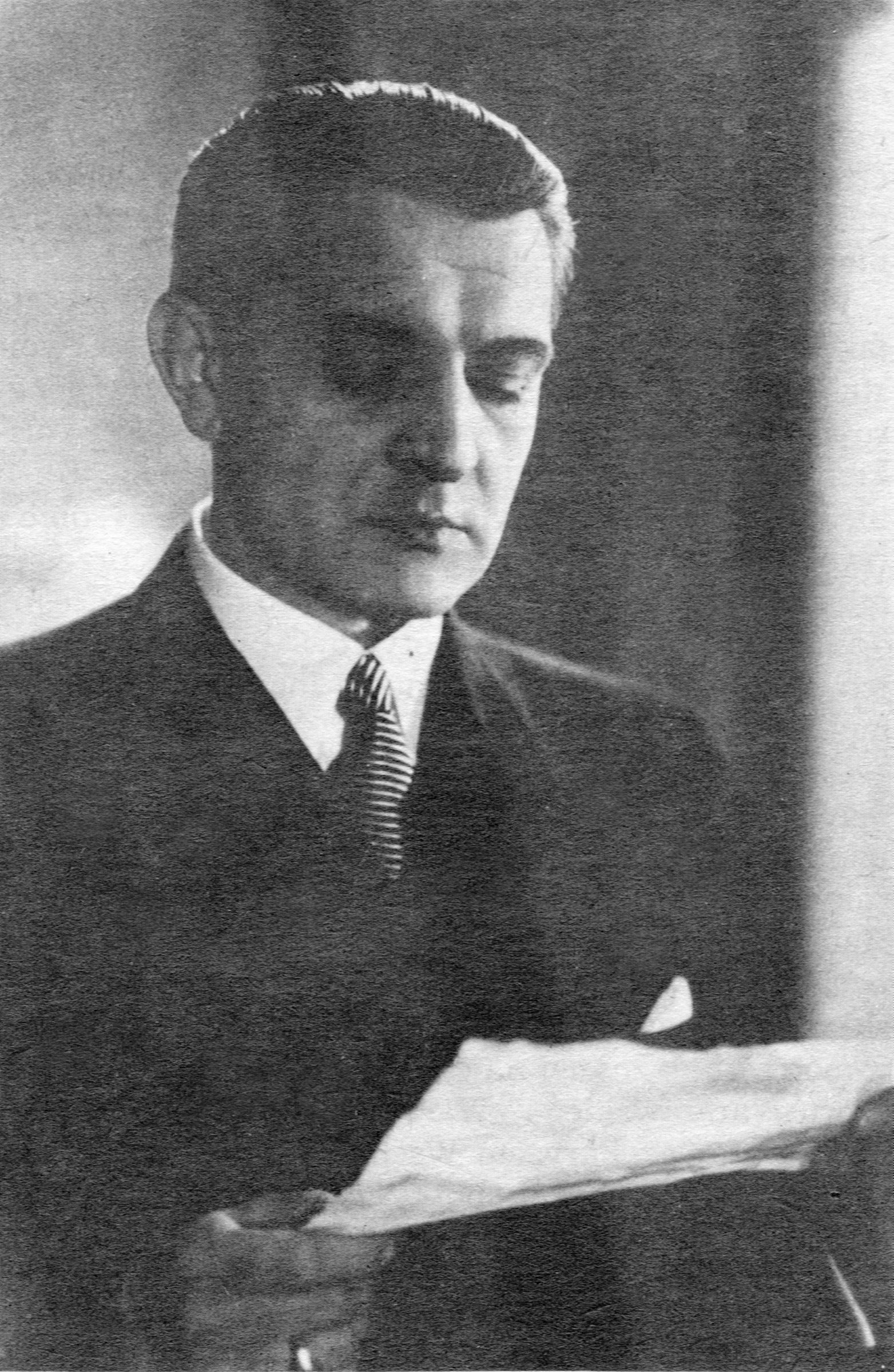
- Born: 29 November 1892; Kwilcz, Kingdom of Prussia (now Poland)
- Died: 17 August 1944 (aged 51); Warsaw, General Government
- Occupation: actor

Franciszek Brodniewicz (29 November 1892 – 17 August 1944) was a Polish actor. He died during the Warsaw Uprising.

== Filmography ==
- Dymitr Samozwaniec as Sigismund III Vasa (1922)
- Prokurator Alicja Horn as Jan Winkler (1933)
- Uhlan's Pledge as Gończa (1934)
- Black Pearl as Rena's husband (1934)
- Córka generała Pankratowa as Bolesław (1934)
- Dzień wielkiej przygody (1935)
- Two Joasias as lawyer Rostalski (1935)
- The Leper as Waldemar Michorowski (1936)
- Pan Twardowski as Twardowski (1936)
- Wierna rzeka as Wiesnicyn (1936)
- Augustus the Strong (1936)
- Mały marynarz as Franciszek Nowicki (1936)
- Daddy Gets Married as Robert Viscont) (1936)
- Ułan księcia Józefa as Józef Poniatowski (1937)
- Count Michorowski as Waldemar Michorowski (1937)
- Heather as Andrzej Sanicki (1938)
- Moi rodzice rozwodzą się as Jerzy Sławomir (1938)
- At the End of the Road as hrabia Wiktor Łański (1939)
- Doctor Murek as Doctor Murek (1939)
- To Happiness Through Tears as Jan Monkiewicz (1941)

== Bibliography ==
- Skaff, Sheila. The Law of the Looking Glass: Cinema in Poland, 1896-1939. Ohio University Press, 2008.
