= A Strong Man =

1929 Polish film

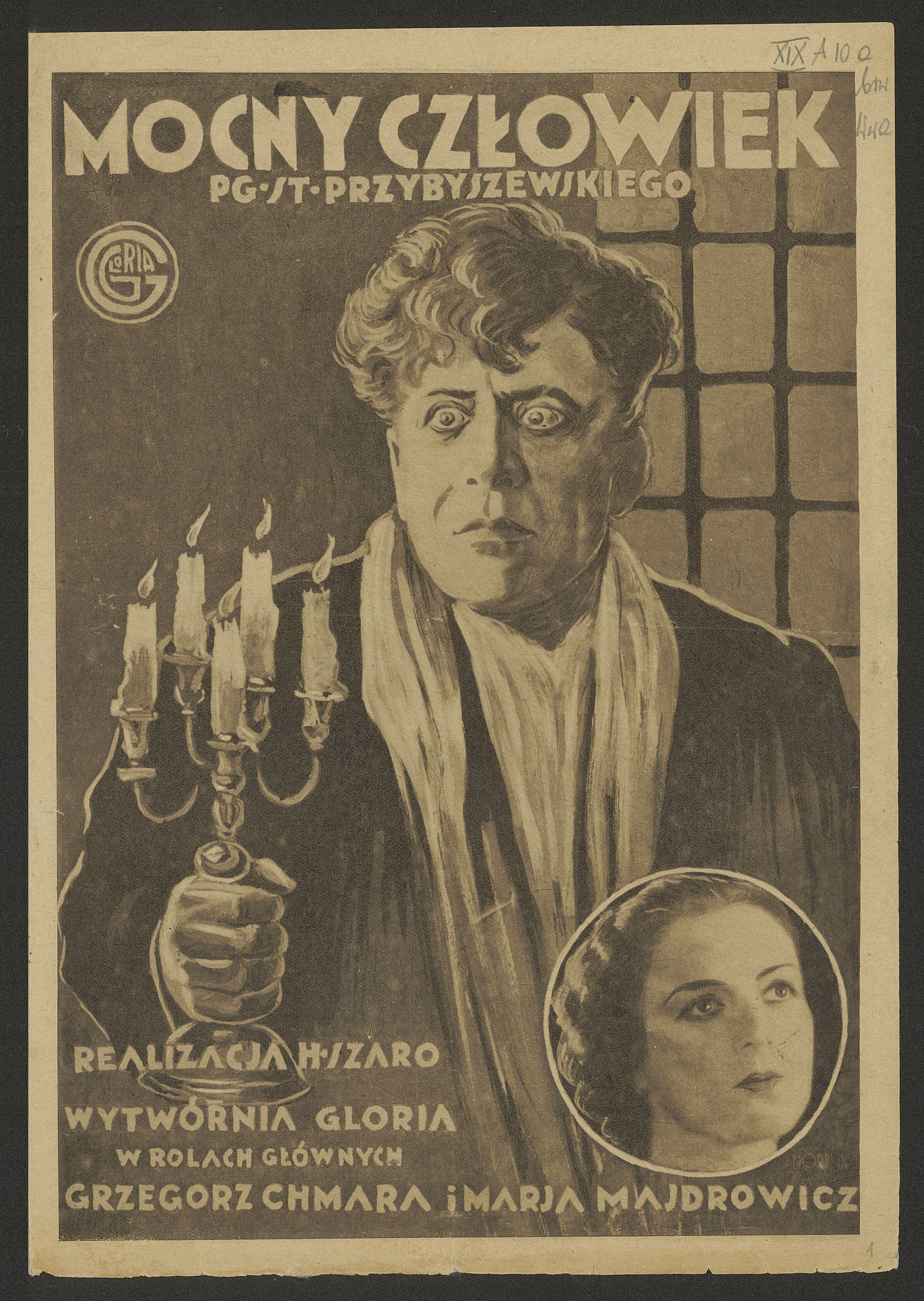
- Poster for the film
- Polish: Mocny człowiek
- Directed by: Henryk Szaro
- Written by: Jerzy Braun; Henryk Szaro
- Produced by: Marek Libkow
- Starring: Gregori Chmara; Agnes Kuck; Julian Krzewiński
- Cinematography: Giovanni Vitrotti
- Music by: Feliks Maliniak
- Production company: Gloria
- Release date: October 2, 1929 (Poland)
- Running time: about 78 minutes
- Country: Poland
- Language: Polish

A Strong Man (Polish: Mocny człowiek) is a 1929 Polish psychological thriller directed by Henryk Szaro and produced by Marek Libkow. It is the second adaptation of Stanisław Przybyszewski's 1912 novel of the same name. As one of the last Polish silent films, it presents a study of an artist (played by Grigorij Chmara) who ultimately loses a battle with his own conscience.

A Strong Man was inspired by the achievements of German expressionist cinema. Thanks to Giovanni Vitrotti's cinematography and the use of several innovative film techniques – such as double/triple exposure, point-of-view shots, and expressive montage – the film was highly regarded for its technical execution, especially within the context of Polish cinema during the interwar period. After World War II, when all known copies of the film in Poland were destroyed, it was long considered lost. It was only in 1997 that a copy was discovered in Belgium and subsequently returned to Poland. In 2006, a digitally restored version was released.

== Plot ==
A Strong Man (1929)

The film is set in interwar Warsaw. Henryk Bielecki, a journalist, is desperate to write a literary work that will bring him fame and fortune. His close friend, Jerzy Górski, has just completed his own novel but is near death. Bielecki plans to steal Górski's manuscript, so he hastens his friend's demise by administering morphine. Bielecki's lover, Łucja, accidentally witnesses Górski's death. He justifies his crime by claiming it was done out of love for her, while taking the deceased's manuscript. The book becomes a success, earning Bielecki the fame and wealth he craved. However, he soon begins an affair with Nina, the wife of his friend Ligęza, neglecting Łucja. When the relationship with Łucja deteriorates, Bielecki decides to kill her. During the premiere of a play based on the stolen novel, Bielecki is exposed. In desperation, he grabs a pistol and commits suicide in front of the gathered audience.

== Cast ==
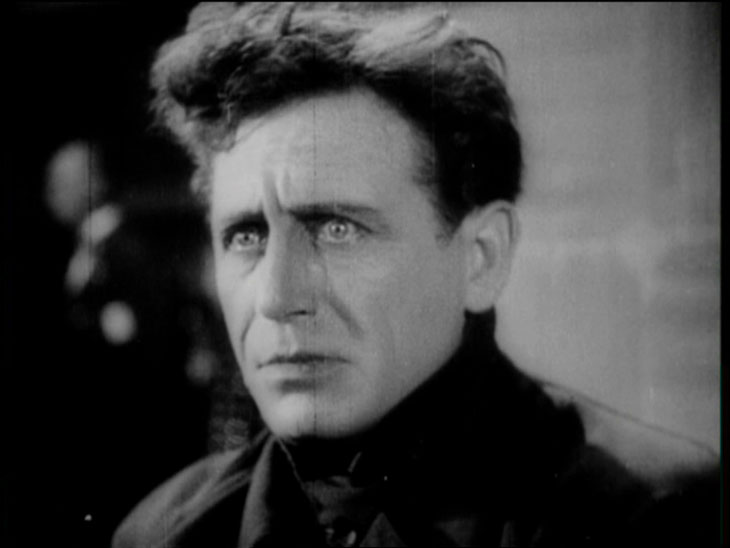
Gregori Chmara, the actor who played Bielecki

- Gregori Chmara – Henryk Bielecki
- Agnes Kuck – Łucja, Bielecki's lover
- Julian Krzewiński – Ligęza, a landowner
- Maria Majdrowiczówna – Nina, Ligęza's wife
- Artur Socha – Jerzy Górski, writer
- Stanisława Wysocka – Bielecki's grandmother
- Bolesław Mierzejewski – Director of the Ateneum Theatre
- Janina Romanówna – Nastka Żegota, actress and Ligęza's lover
- Aleksander Zelwerowicz – publisher
- Jan Kurnakowicz – publisher's secretary
- Ludwik Fritsche – moneylender
- Jerzy Dworski – Karewicz, set designer at Ateneum Theatre
- Lech Owron – actor
- Władysław Walter – theatre doorman
- Tadeusz Fijewski – Hotel Europejski bellboy

== Production ==
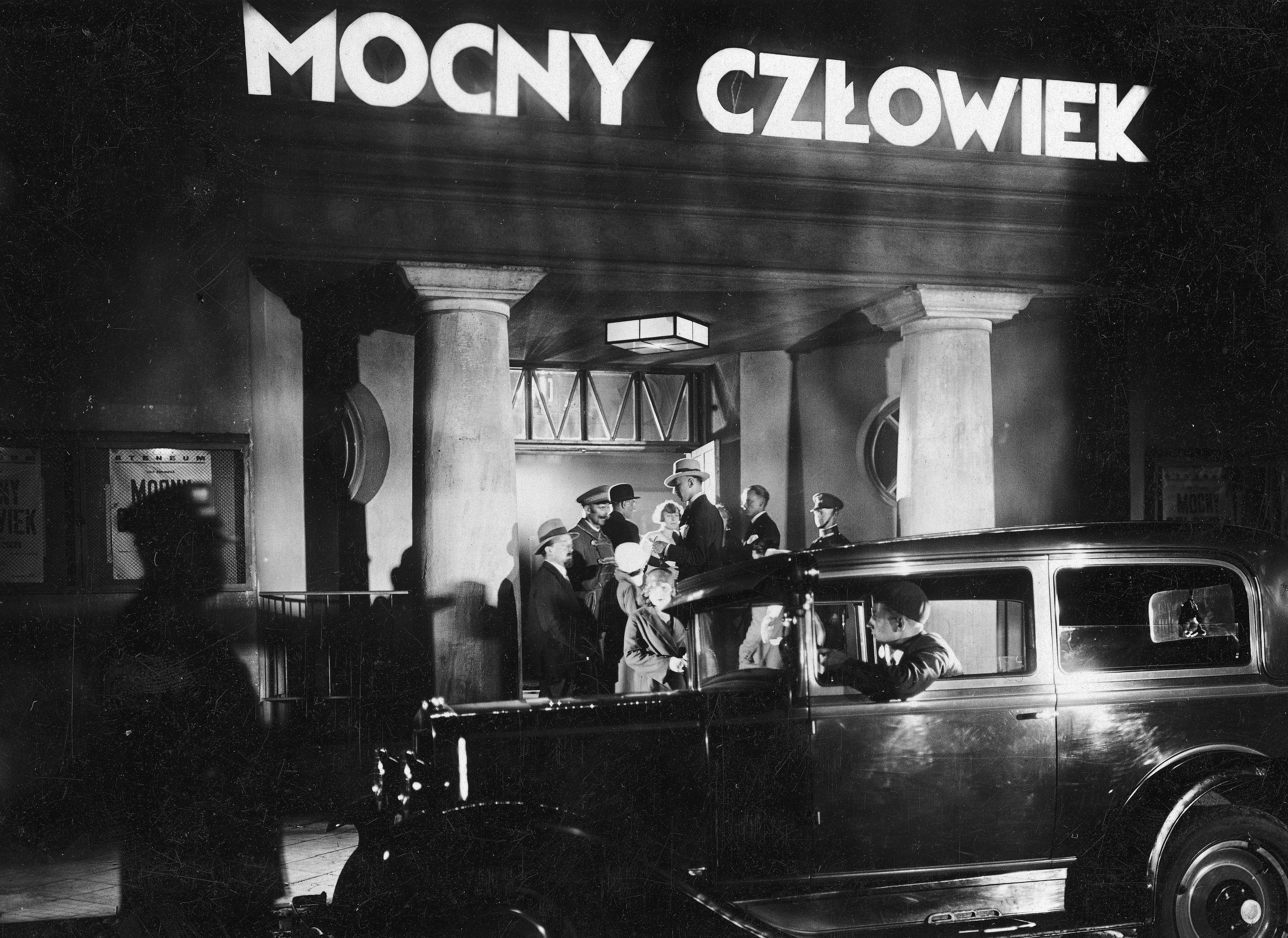
Scene from A Strong Man in front of the Ateneum Theatre

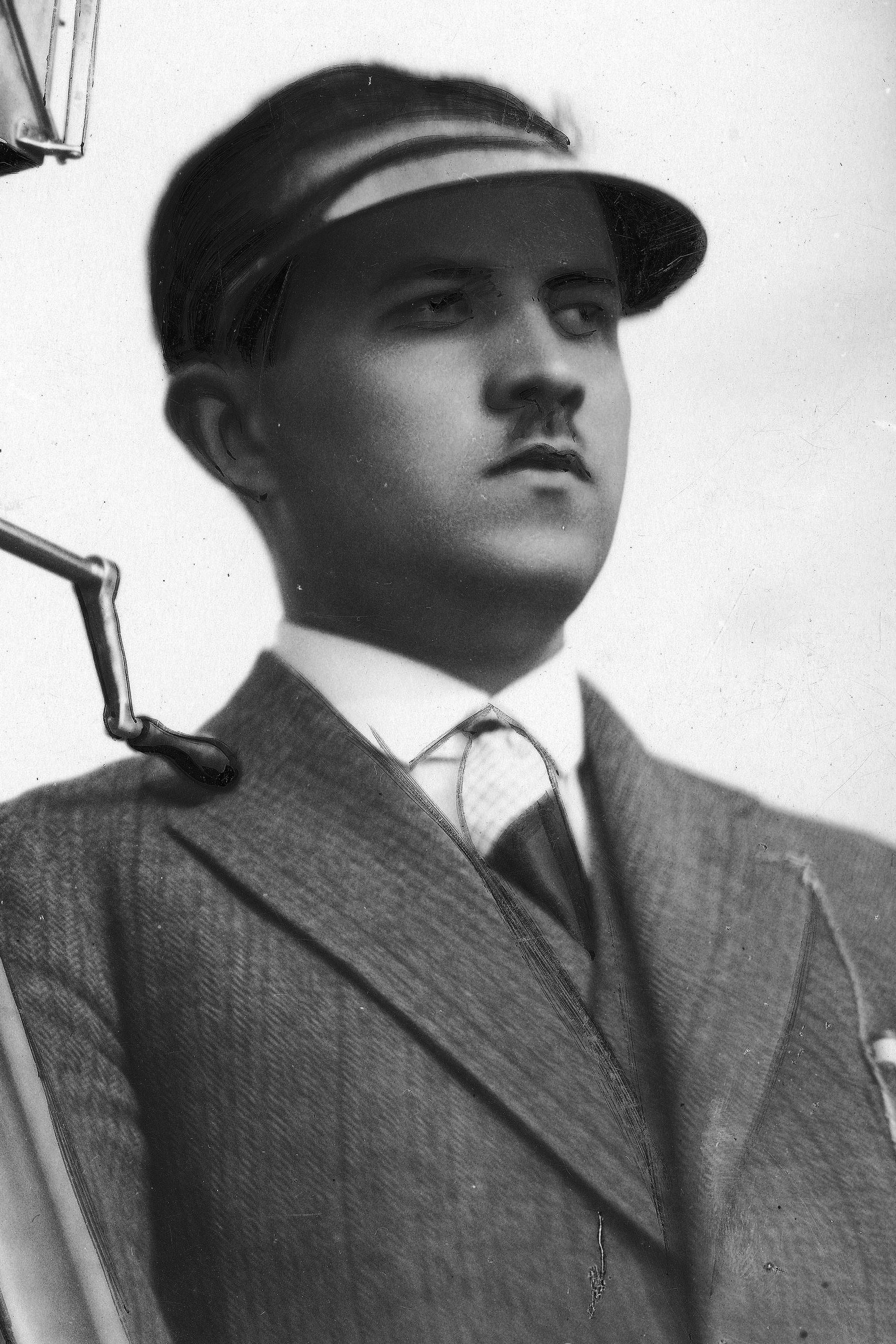
Henryk Szaro, the film's director

The screenplay for A Strong Man was based on the three-volume novel by Stanisław Przybyszewski (1911–1913), with each volume titled: Mocny człowiek (A Strong Man), Wyzwolenie (Liberation), and Święty gaj (Sacred Grove). Przybyszewski's literary fame was short-lived, waning during World War I. Thus, the choice to adapt A Strong Man for the screen was unexpected. The first cinematic adaptation occurred in 1917, when Vsevolod Meyerhold brought A Strong Man to the screen, drawn to Przybyszewski's expressionist themes. 12 years later, Henryk Szaro, a student of Meyerhold, took on the task of adapting it once again.

The idea for the adaptation came from producer Marek Libkow. The film's director, Henryk Szaro, co-wrote the screenplay with Jerzy Braun, a writer, editor, and publisher of Kraków's Gazeta Literacka. The literary adaptation of the screenplay was overseen by Andrzej Strug, who admitted in interviews that he updated the story's message: "The goal was to throw the protagonist into a contemporary setting, modernize his psyche, and strip away his demonic traits". As a result, Szaro's film not only addressed psychological themes but also touched on social issues, illustrating Warsaw's society at the time. The role of Bielecki was played by Russian actor Gregori Chmara, a refugee from the White émigré community.

=== Film style ===
The cinematography for A Strong Man was handled by Italian operator Giovanni Vitrotti. The filmmakers shot urban scenes in Warsaw and edited the film using double or, at times, triple exposure. Artur Piskorz, in a retrospective article, described the film's visual aspect (a result of the mentioned editing) as a manifestation of the creators' fascination with urban life: "The even flicker of neon lights, the steady ticking of clocks, the clatter of carriages on cobblestone streets, the hum of a printing press... City, machine, mechanization". Szaro juxtaposed scenes set in dim light or bright daylight with those taking place in dark interiors, contrasting the demonic image of the city with the idyllic view of the countryside that Bielecki visits with Nina.

Robert Birkholc noted that "the state of consciousness of the main character is conveyed through a full range of techniques: point-of-view shots, expressive montage contrasts, superimposed images, angles, and camera movements". Szaro drew inspiration from Vsevolod Meyerhold, the creator of the Russian adaptation of A Strong Man, in terms of craftsmanship. Additionally, the director chose to forgo conventional intertitles during the most dramatic moments of the film, placing titles directly within the frame and giving them movement. This stylistic choice, according to Jerzy Stachowicz, contributed to "much greater expressive power" than if the director had relied solely on intertitles.

== Reception ==
The premiere of A Strong Man took place on 2 October 1929. Despite limited audience interest, the film turned out to be a major artistic success, unparalleled in Polish cinema at the time. Interwar film critics recognized the film's references to the aesthetics of German expressionism. Janusz Maria Brzeski, writing for Ilustrowany Kurier Codzienny, admired the portrayal of Poland's capital: "Warsaw throbbing with life, with its skyscrapers, full of the lights and shadows of a big city. Warsaw, with its never-sleeping streets, full of cars and omnibuses – elegant couples – painted girls – café hooliganism, and all those contrasts that foreign directors so skillfully operate". According to Wieczór, A Strong Man demonstrated the international aspirations of Polish cinema: "It proves without a doubt that we are on the right path and that soon Polish films may be able to go abroad". Similarly, Karol Ford in Głos Prawdy wrote: "The crowd scenes could serve as a model for many a foreign filmmaker, and the technical side could impress even overseas studios". Stefania Heymanowa in Bluszcz stated that Szaro's work "could be shown all over Europe", though it was "too grim for American screens".

In a retrospective article, Natasza Korczarowska-Różycka emphasized that "the modernist anachronisms of the plot were overshadowed by the mastery of the cinematography", though in fact, Szaro's film remained "isolated" in its success within interwar Polish cinema. Joanna Preizner highlighted that the central message of A Strong Man was "a critique of the pursuit of success at any cost, a critique of a world that values only the rich and famous". Preizner also noted that beyond its connections to German expressionism, Szaro's film was "primarily a poignant and credible tale of human downfall". In a poll organized by the Museum of Cinematography in Łódź in 2015, on the occasion of cinema's 120th anniversary, where film culture promoters and filmmakers selected the 12 best Polish films, A Strong Man was the only Polish film from the interwar period to receive more than one vote. Paula Apanowicz from the OldCamera.pl portal considered A Strong Man the greatest Polish silent film.

== Distribution ==
After World War II, no copies of the film survived in Poland, and it was considered lost. However, in 1997, it was rediscovered in Belgium, at the Royal Film Archive. It turned out that shortly after its release in 1929, the film had been sold to several Western European countries. After being brought back to Poland, it was digitally restored. In 2006, it was released on DVD, accompanied by music from Maleńczuk Tuta Rutkowski Super Trio.

== Bibliography ==
- Korczarowska-Różycka, N. (2015). "Ekspresjonizm to gra... Ale właściwie, czemu nie? Mabuseria, czyli eksperyment w "Mocnym człowieku" Henryka Szaro" [Expressionism is a Game... But Really, Why Not? Mabuseria, or Experiment in Henryk Szaro's "A Strong Man"]. Kwartalnik Filmowy (in Polish) (89–90): 306–319. doi:10.36744/kf.2342. ISSN 0452-9502.
- Piskorz, A. (2015). ""Bujający w obłokach fantasta" – Henryk Szaro i jego Mocny człowiek" ["Head in the Clouds Dreamer" – Henryk Szaro and His "A Strong Man"] (PDF). Media – Kultura – Komunikacja Społeczna (in Polish). 11 (1).
- Stachowicz, J. (2018). Komputery, powieści i kino nieme. Procesy remediacji w perspektywie historycznej [Computers, Novels and Silent Cinema. Remediation Processes from a Historical Perspective] (in Polish). Warsaw: Wydawnictwo Uniwersytetu Warszawskiego. ISBN 978-83-235-3320-7.
