= The Final Touch =

1928 film

- Directed by: Juliusz Gardan
- Written by: Juliusz Gardan
- Starring: Stefan Szwarc; Tadeusz Fijewski; Ludwik Fritsche
- Cinematography: Seweryn Steinwurzel
- Edited by: Seweryn Steinwurzel
- Production company: Leo-Film
- Release date: 30 August 1928
- Country: Poland
- Languages: Silent; Polish intertitles

The Final Touch or The Dot on the I (Polish: Kropka nad i) is a 1928 Polish silent drama film directed by Juliusz Gardan and starring Stefan Szwarc, Tadeusz Fijewski and Ludwik Fritsche. The film's sets were designed by the art director Leo Forbert.

== Cast ==
- Lili Romska as Girl
- Stefan Szwarc as Man
- Bianka Dodo as Daughter
- Tadeusz Fijewski as Boy
- Robert Boelke as Other man
- Ludwik Fritsche as Autor
- Józef Maliszewski as Director

== Bibliography ==
- Ford, Charles & Hammond, Robert. Polish Film: A Twentieth Century History. McFarland, 2005.
- Haltof, Marek. Historical Dictionary of Polish Cinema. Rowman & Littlefield Publishers, 2015.
- Skaff, Sheila. The Law of the Looking Glass: Cinema in Poland, 1896-1939. Ohio University Press, 2008.
