= Ludwik Fritsche =

Polish actor

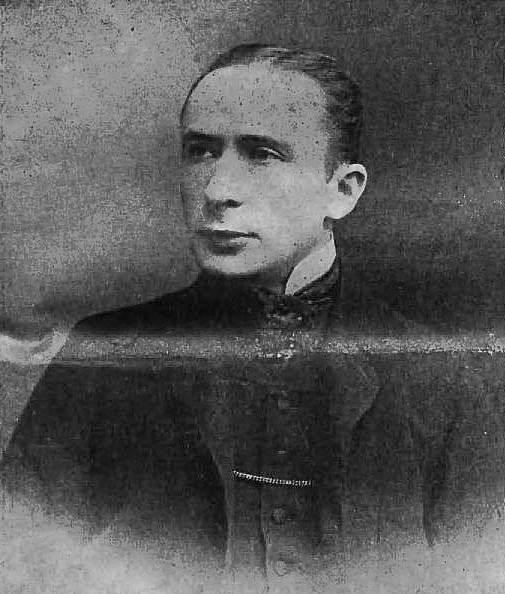
- circa 1905
- Born: 17 August 1872; Częstochowa, Poland, Russian Empire (now Częstochowa, Poland)
- Died: 4 September 1940 (aged 68); Warsaw, Poland
- Occupation: Actor
- Years active: 1922-1940

Ludwik Fritsche (17 August 1872 – 4 September 1940) was a Polish film actor. He appeared in more than 25 films between 1922 and 1940.

== Selected filmography ==
- The Unspeakable (1924)
- Pan Tadeusz (1928)
- The Final Touch (1928)
- A Strong Man (1929)
- The Beauty of Life (1930)
- A Heart on the Street (1931)
- The Ten from Pawiak Prison (1931)
- His Excellency, The Shop Assistant (1933)
- Każdemu wolno kochać (1933)
- The Story of Sin (1933)
- Ten Percent for Me (1933)
- Pieśniarz Warszawy (1934)
- Two Joasias (1935)
- The Leper (1936)
- 30 karatów szczęścia (1936)
- Bohaterowie Sybiru (1936)
- Count Michorowski (1937)
- Halka (1937)
- At the End of the Road (1939)
