= Nora Ney (actress) =

Polish film actress (1906–2003)

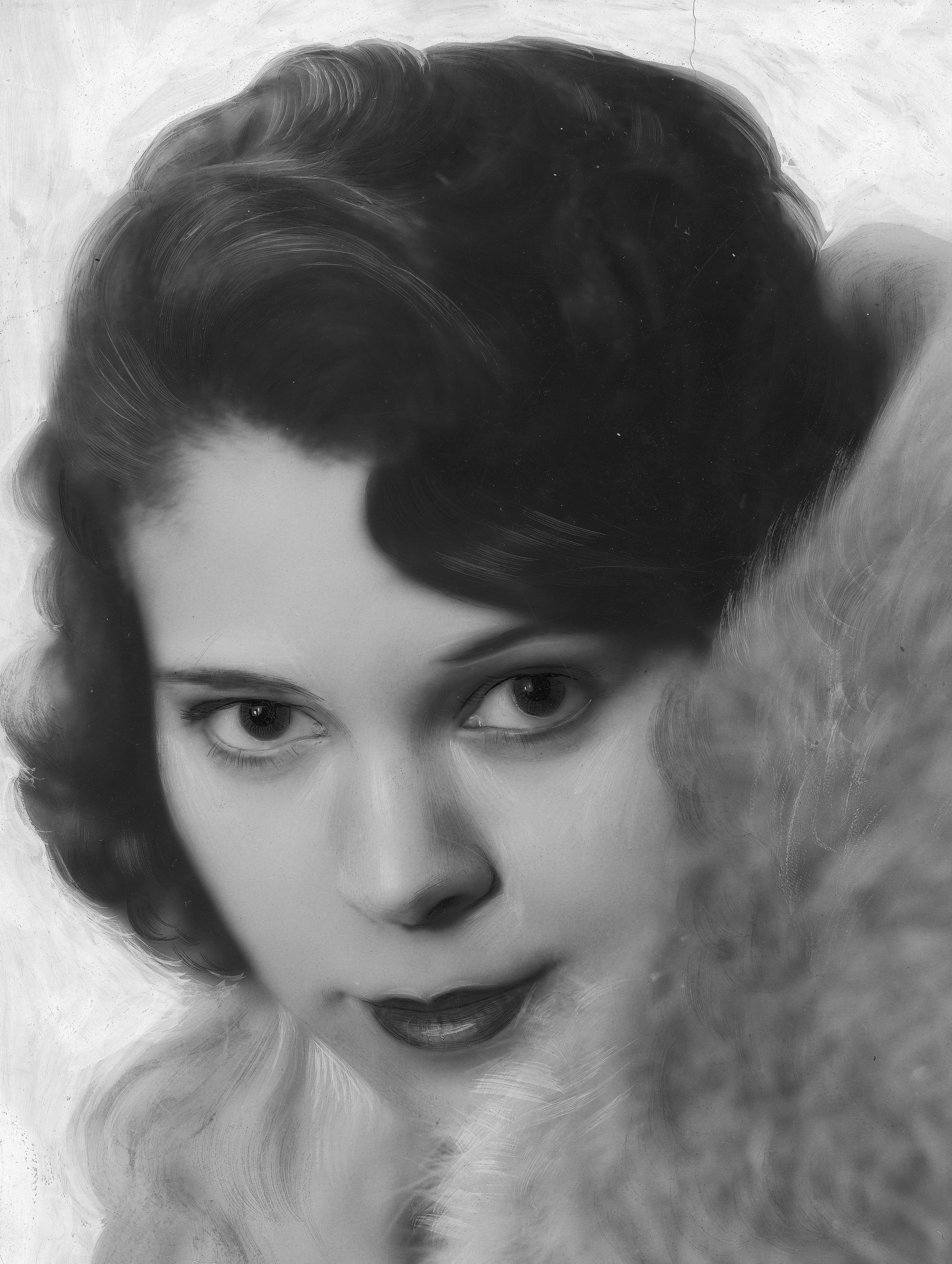
- Nora Ney, 1930
- Born: 25 May 1906; Sielachowskie, Podlaskie, Poland
- Died: 21 February 2003 (aged 96); Encinitas, California, USA
- Other names: Sonia Najman; Zofia Neuman

Nora Ney (born Sonia Najman or Zofia Neuman; 25 May 1906 – 21 February 2003) was a Polish film actress of Jewish descent.

Ney fled Poland to the USSR after the German occupation to accept an invitation from Mosfilm, but was soon deported to Kazakhstan. In 1946 she moved to the USA with her daughter Joanna. Due to the language barrier, she managed to secure only minor non-speaking roles in American films. She was married four times. Her first husband was the cinematographer Seweryn Steinwurzel.

== Biography ==
In an interview for a Polish weekly "Kino", the actress said that she was born in the village of Sielachowskie, while other sources say she was born in the town of Wasilków where her entire family lived. Her father, Jakob Najman, ran a woodyard and was a wealthy entrepreneur. Sonia's mother, Maria, died when she was still a small child, and her father remarried.

In 1925, she passed her high school final exams at the elite, private, coeducational Dawid Druskin High School in Białystok. Shortly after finishing her education, aware of plans to marry her off to a wealthy, older man, she left home.

The later great star of pre-war Polish cinema went to Warsaw, where she began studying at the Wiktor Biegański Film Institute. Her excellent conditions: extraordinary beauty, perfect figure, and high physical fitness were quickly appreciated, and her first film role allowed her to win a permanent contract with the Leo-Film studio, which guaranteed her economic stability and decent living conditions. Nora Ney debuted in 1926 with an episodic role as a circus performer in the silent film Red Jester (a crime comedy directed by Henryk Szaro). Her most famous role was the character of Aniuta in the film General Pankratov's Daughter (1934).

When the war broke out in 1939, Nora Ney, together with her daughter and husband, escaped to the East, to the Soviet Union; she was exiled deep into the empire which paradoxically saved her life. After the war, after a short stay in Poland, she decided to go to the United States - together with her daughter Joanna and sister Lidia Leichter, she came to New York in 1946, where she took small, silent film roles due to language reasons.

Ney married four times. Her first life partner was Seweryn Steinwurzel, an outstanding cinematographer who collaborated with her on many productions, and co-creator of her celebrity image in Polish cinema. The second spouse was Józef Fryd, a journalist, a distributor of foreign films in Poland, and a film producer. Ney's third husband was psychiatrist Eugeniusz J. Brown, with whom Nora did not have a long relationship in the United States. Her last husband was Leon Friedland, a retired businessman with St. Petersburg roots, with whom she moved to the south of the USA in the late 1980s. She died in Encinitas, California on February 21, 2003, aged 96.

The actress's only daughter, Joanna Maria Ney, born in 1936 from her marriage to Józef Fryd, is an American PR specialist, curator of dance art, and a member of the American Academy of Motion Picture Arts and Sciences.

== Selected filmography ==
- The Call of the Sea (1927)
- The Woman Who Desires Sin (Kobieta, która grzechu pragnie, 1929)
- Police Chief Tagiejew (1929)
- The Beauty of Life (1930)
- A Heart on the Street (1931)
- Sound of the Desert (Głos pustyni, 1932)
- Córka generała Pankratowa (1934)
- Kobiety nad przepaścią (1938)
- Doctor Murek (Doktór Murek, 1939)
