= The Leper (film) =

1936 film

- Directed by: Juliusz Gardan
- Written by: Jan Fethke; Juliusz Gardan
- Based on: The Leper by Helena Mniszek
- Produced by: Alfred Niemirski
- Starring: Elzbieta Barszczewska; Franciszek Brodniewicz; Tamara Wiszniewska
- Cinematography: Seweryn Steinwurzel
- Music by: Wladyslaw Eiger
- Production company: Sfinks
- Release date: 17 September 1936
- Running time: 90 minutes
- Country: Poland
- Language: Polish

The Leper (Polish: Tredowata) is a 1936 Polish romantic drama film directed by Juliusz Gardan and starring Elzbieta Barszczewska, Franciszek Brodniewicz and Tamara Wiszniewska. The film's sets were designed by the art directors Stefan Norris and Jacek Rotmil. It is based on the 1909 novel by Helena Mniszek.

== Cast ==
- Elzbieta Barszczewska as Stefcia Rudecka
- Franciszek Brodniewicz as Waldemar Michorowski
- Tamara Wiszniewska as Lucia Elzonowska
- Mieczyslawa Cwiklinska as Baroness Idalia Elzonowska
- Zofia Lindorf as Rita Barska
- Waclaw Pawlowski as Pratnicki, Stefcia's two-faced suitor
- Kazimierz Junosza-Stepowski as Maciej Michorowski
- Zygmunt Chmielewski as Count Barski
- Irena Malkiewicz as Melania Barska
- Wladyslaw Grabowski as Count Treska
- Wanda Jarszewska as Cwileka
- Ludwik Fritsche as The Baroness' Majordomo
- Józef Wegrzyn as Rudecki
- Alina Halska as Rudecka
- Maria Bozejewiczówna as Cwileka's Daughter
- Józef Zejdowski as Attending Physician
- Stanislawa Wysocka as A Duchess

== Bibliography ==
- Haltof, Marek. Historical Dictionary of Polish Cinema. Rowman & Littlefield Publishers, 2015.
- Skaff, Sheila. The History of Cinema in Poland and the Transition from Silent to Sound Film, 1896-1939. University of Michigan, 2004.
