= Police Chief Tagiejew =

1929 film

- Directed by: Juliusz Gardan
- Written by: Tadeusz Konczyc
- Based on: Pan policmajster Tagiejew by Gabriela Zapolska
- Produced by: Maria Hirszbein
- Starring: Boguslaw Samborski; Zbigniew Sawan; Maria Bogda
- Cinematography: Seweryn Steinwurzel
- Production company: Leo Film
- Release date: 30 March 1929
- Running time: 85 minutes
- Country: Poland
- Languages: Silent; Polish intertitles

Police Chief Tagiejew (Polish: Policmajster Tagiejew) is a 1929 Polish silent historical drama film directed by Juliusz Gardan and starring Boguslaw Samborski, Zbigniew Sawan and Maria Bogda. The film's sets were designed by the art director Józef Galewski. One of the most star-studded productions of the year, it is set in the nineteenth century during opression of the Poles by the Russian Emperor.

== Cast ==
- Boguslaw Samborski as Tagiejew
- Zbigniew Sawan as Wladyslaw Klicki, a painter
- Antoni Rózanski as Horski
- Maria Bogda as Jania Horska
- Jerzy Marr as Kazio Horski
- Nora Ney as Józia, maid
- Eugeniusz Bodo as Markowski
- Adolf Dymsza as Siemipudow
- Marta Flantz as Autun
- Lili Romska as Cabaret singer
- Julian Krzewinski as Hotel owner
- Henryk Rzetkowski as Policeman
- Halina Rapacka as Dancer
- Wieslawa Morecka as Dancer

== Bibliography ==
- Haltof, Marek. Historical Dictionary of Polish Cinema. Rowman & Littlefield Publishers, 2015.
- Skaff, Sheila. The Law of the Looking Glass: Cinema in Poland, 1896–1939. Ohio University Press, 2008.
