= Zbigniew Sawan =

Polish actor (1904–1984)

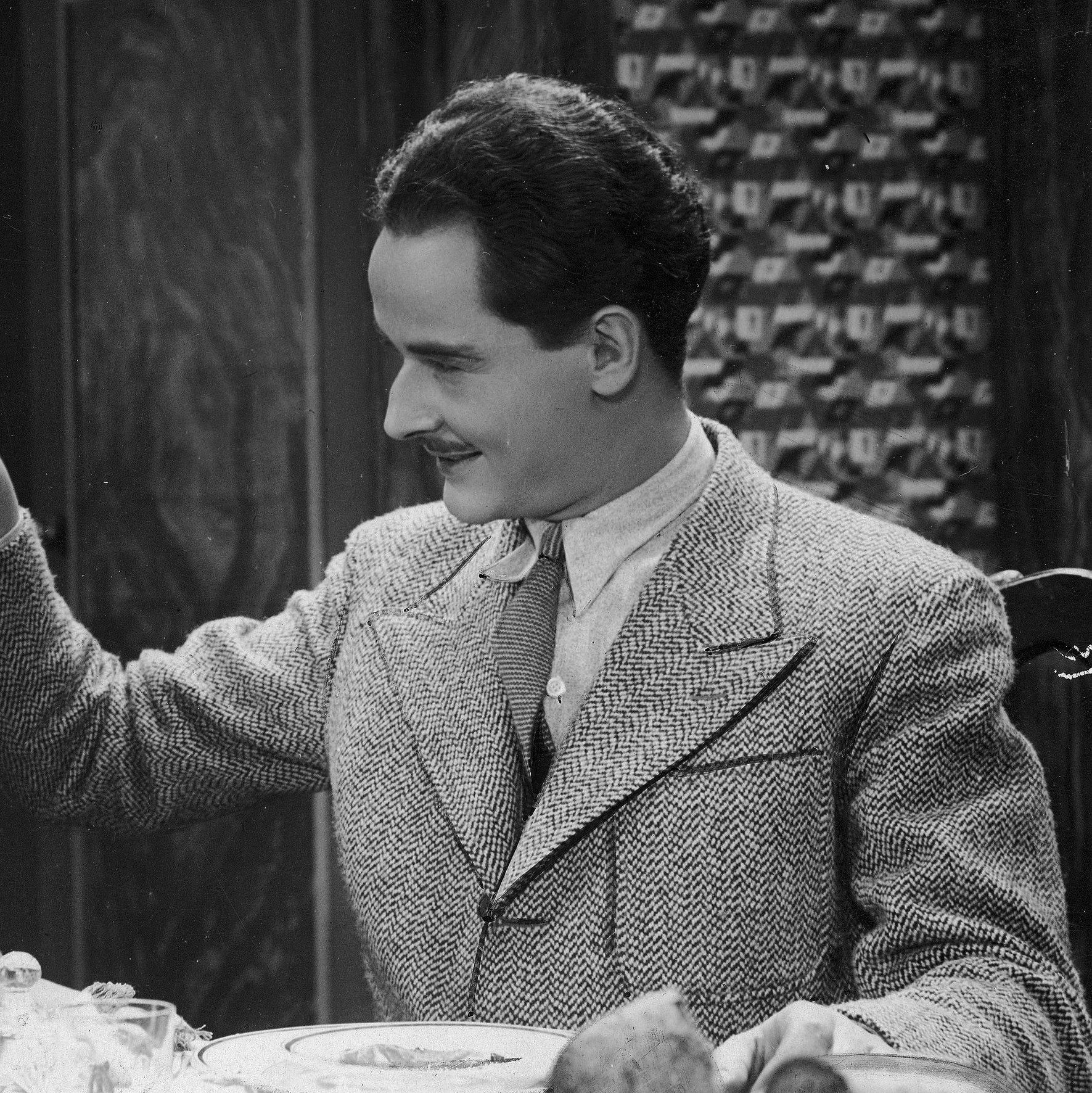
- Born: Zbigniew Nowakowski; 14 April 1904; Voskresenovka, Kursk Oblast, Russian Empire (now Russia)
- Died: 4 June 1984 (aged 80); Warsaw, Poland
- Occupations: Actor, theatre director
- Years active: 1928-1984
- Spouses: Maria Malicka, Lidia Wysocka

Zbigniew Sawan (14 April 1904 – 4 June 1984) was a Polish stage and film actor. He appeared in more than 25 films between 1928 and 1984. Studied directing in Państwowy Instytut Sztuki Teatralnej.

== Selected filmography ==
- Huragan (1928)
- The Wild Girl (1928)
- Pod banderą miłości (1929)
- Police Chief Tagiejew (1929)
- A Heart on the Street (1931)
- Uwiedziona (1931)
- The Palace on Wheels (1932)
- Ostatnia brygada (1938)
- The Ashes (1965)
