= Miss Minister Is Dancing =

1937 film

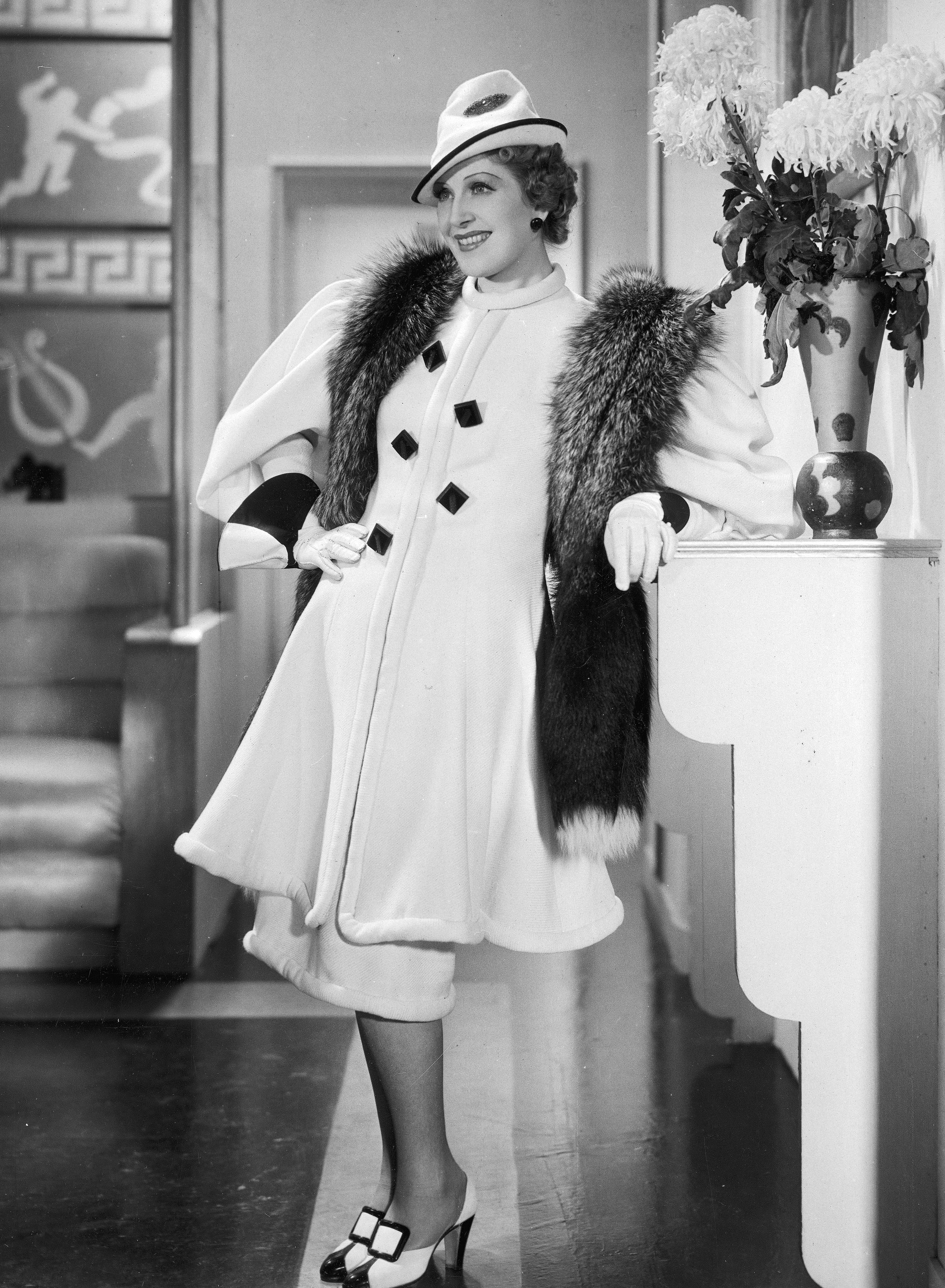
- Tola Mankiewiczówna in the film
- Directed by: Juliusz Gardan
- Written by: Alicja Stern; Anatol Stern; Konrad Tom
- Produced by: Marek M. Libkow
- Starring: Tola Mankiewiczówna; Aleksander Zabczynski; Józef Orwid
- Cinematography: Albert Wywerka
- Music by: Henry Vars
- Production company: Libkow Film
- Distributed by: Kinopol
- Release date: 21 January 1937
- Running time: 82 minutes
- Country: Poland
- Language: Polish

Miss Minister Is Dancing (Polish: Pani minister tanczy) is a 1937 Polish romantic comedy film directed by Juliusz Gardan and starring Tola Mankiewiczówna, Aleksander Zabczynski and Józef Orwid. It was shot at the Falanga Studios in Warsaw. The film's sets were designed by the art directors Stefan Norris and Jacek Rotmil.

== Cast ==
- Tola Mankiewiczówna as Minister Zuzanna/Lola, her twin
- Aleksander Zabczynski as Count Sebastian Maria Rajmund de Santis
- Józef Orwid as Apoloniusz
- Mieczyslawa Cwiklinska as Leopoldyna 'Polly' Gribaldi
- Michal Znicz as The Opposition Party Leader
- Konrad Tom as Nightclub Show Manager
- Stanislaw Sielanski as The Headwaiter
- Stefan Hnydzinski as Lola's Husband
- Henryk Malkowski as Bumcyk

== Bibliography ==
- Haltof, Marek. Historical Dictionary of Polish Cinema. Rowman & Littlefield Publishers, 2015.
- Skaff, Sheila. The History of Cinema in Poland and the Transition from Silent to Sound Film, 1896-1939. University of Michigan, 2004.
