= Stefan Norris =

- Born: 29 April 1894; Warsaw, Russian Empire
- Died: 24 November 1979 (aged 85); Bucharest, Romania
- Other name: Stefan Norr
- Occupation: Art director
- Years active: 1924-1975 (film)
- Parent(s): Stefan Norris, Tatiana Chuckrinder

Stefan Norris (1894–1979) was a Polish-born art director. He designed the sets for more than a hundred films. After the Invasion of Poland during the Second World War he settled and worked in Romania.

== Selected filmography ==
- The Wild Girl (1928)
- The Beauty of Life (1930)
- Ten Percent for Me (1933)
- Is Lucyna a Girl? (1934)
- Uhlan's Pledge (1934)
- Two Joasias (1935)
- The Haunted Manor (1936)
- The Leper (1936)
- Count Michorowski (1937)
- The Girls from Nowolipki (1937)
- Miss Minister Is Dancing (1937)
- Three Troublemakers (1937)
- The Vow (1937)
- Heather (1938)
- The Line (1938)
- Robert and Bertram (1938)
- At the End of the Road (1939)
- Krystyna's Lie (1939)
- A Sportsman Against His Will (1940)
- To Happiness Through Tears (1941)
- The Valley Resounds (1950)
- In Our Village (1951)
- Titanic Waltz (1964)

== Bibliography ==
- Hames, Peter. The Cinema Of Central Europe. Wallflower Press, 2004.
