= Krystyna's Lie =

1939 film

- Directed by: Henryk Szaro
- Written by: Stefan Kiedrzynski; Anatol Stern; Henryk Szaro
- Based on: Dzien upragniony by Stefan Kiedrzynski
- Produced by: Maria Hirszbein; Jerzy Starczewski
- Starring: Elzbieta Barszczewska; Lena Zelichowska; Jerzy Pichelski.
- Cinematography: Seweryn Steinwurzel
- Music by: Henry Vars
- Production company: Leo-Film
- Release date: 31 January 1939
- Running time: 93 minutes
- Country: Poland
- Language: Polish

Krystyna's Lie (Polish: Klamstwo Krystyny) is a 1939 Polish drama film directed by Henryk Szaro and starring Elzbieta Barszczewska, Mieczyslawa Cwiklinska and Michal Znicz. It was shot at the Sfinks Studios in Warsaw. The film's sets were designed by the art director Stefan Norris and Jacek Rotmil.

== Cast ==
- Elzbieta Barszczewska as Krystyna Olakówna
- Jerzy Sliwinski as Janek Marlecki
- Mieczyslawa Cwiklinska as Teofila Marlecka, Janek's mother
- Michal Znicz as Olak, Krystyna's father
- Kazimierz Junosza-Stepowski as Father Marlecki
- Feliks Chmurkowski as Wróbelek, clerk
- Tadeusz Fijewski as Messenger
- Loda Halama as Dancer
- Stefan Hnydzinski as Drunk
- Julian Krzewinski as Servant
- Zofia Niwinska as Halinka, Janek's fiancée
- Boguslaw Samborski as Klimkiewicz
- Stanislaw Wolinski as Portier Józef
- Jacek Woszczerowicz as Krazek
- Maria Chmurkowska as Guest
- Pawel Owerllo as Guest

== Bibliography ==
- Haltof, Marek. Historical Dictionary of Polish Cinema. Rowman & Littlefield Publishers, 2015.
- Skaff, Sheila. The Law of the Looking Glass: Cinema in Poland, 1896-1939. Ohio University Press, 2008.
