= Janina Janecka =

Polish actress (1893–1938)

- Born: 20 October 1893; Łódź, Congress Poland
- Died: 21 February 1938 (aged 44); Warsaw, Poland
- Occupation: Actress
- Years active: 1932-1938

Janina Janecka, real name Janina Dobrzyńska (20 October 1893 – 21 February 1938) was a Polish film actress. She appeared in eleven films between 1932 and 1938.

== Selected filmography ==
- Ten Percent for Me (1933)
- Two Joasias (1935)
- Bolek i Lolek (1936)
- The Girls from Nowolipki (1937)
- Heather (1938)
