= The Call of the Sea (1927 film) =

1927 film

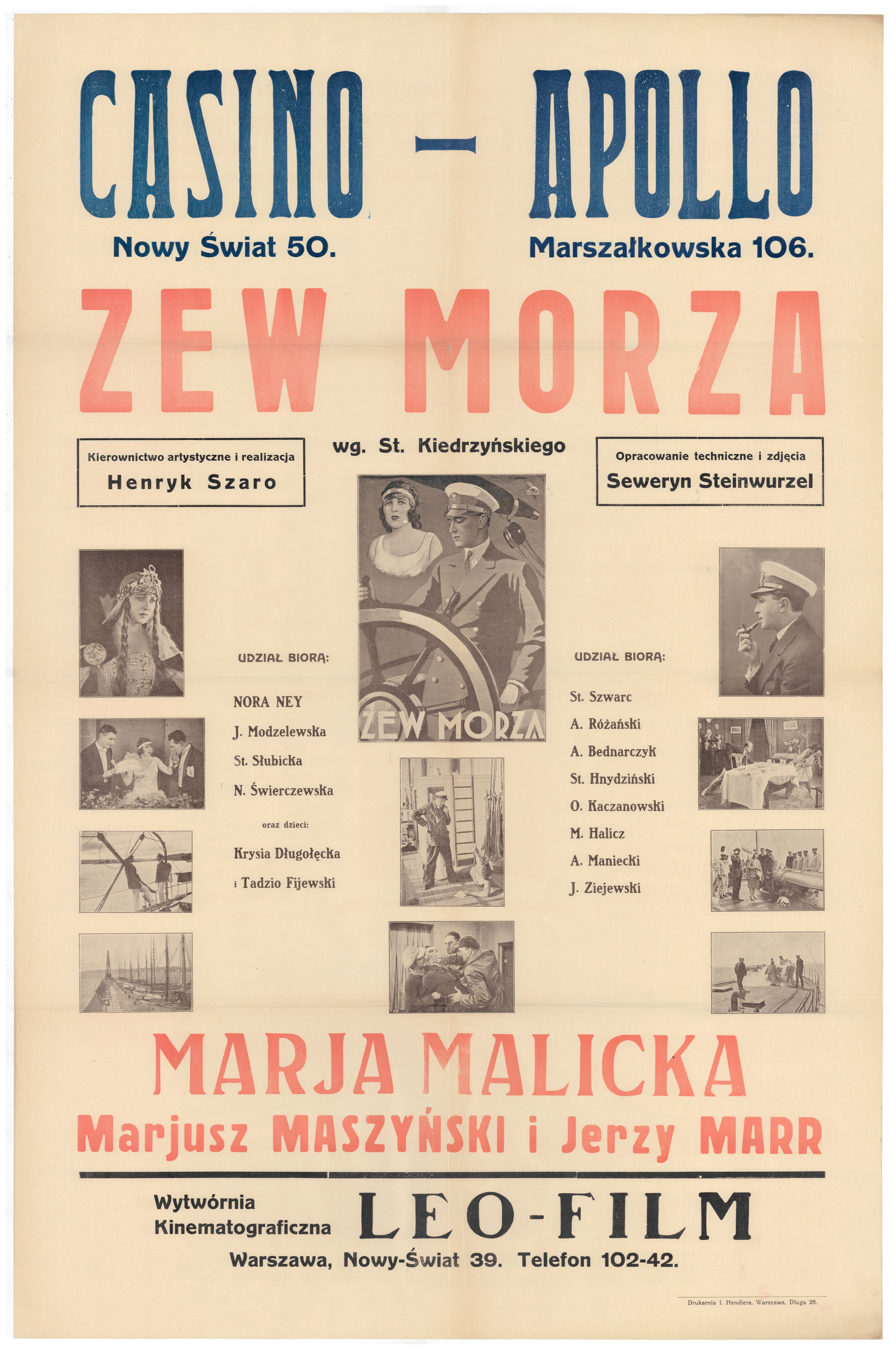
- Directed by: Henryk Szaro
- Written by: Stefan Kiedrzynski
- Produced by: Maria Hirszbein; Wladyslaw Markiewicz
- Starring: Maria Malicka; Jerzy Marr; Nora Ney
- Cinematography: Seweryn Steinwurzel
- Production company: Leo-Film
- Release date: 13 October 1927
- Running time: 126 minutes
- Country: Poland
- Languages: Silent; Polish intertitles

The Call of the Sea (Polish: Zew morza) is a 1927 Polish silent romance film directed by Henryk Szaro and starring Maria Malicka, Jerzy Marr and Nora Ney. The film's sets were designed by the art director Józef Galewski.

== Cast ==
- Maria Malicka as Hanka Ostojska/Princess
- Krysia Dlugolecka as Hanka, 7 year
- Antoni Rózanski as Miller
- Józefa Modzelewska as Miller's wife
- Jerzy Marr as Stach/Prince
- Nora Ney as Jola Van Loos
- Tadeusz Fijewski as Stach - Age 10
- Mariusz Maszynski as Karol Skarski
- Stefan Szwarc as Bosman Rudolf Minke
- Aleksander Maniecki as Helmsman Karlsen
- Janusz Ziejewski as Sailor
- Michal Halicz as Smuggler
- Stefan Hnydzinski as Farmhand in the mill
- Nina Swierczewska as Maid
- Antoni Bednarczyk as Captain Van Loos

== Bibliography ==
- Ford, Charles & Hammond, Robert. Polish Film: A Twentieth Century History. McFarland, 2005.
- Haltof, Marek. Historical Dictionary of Polish Cinema. Rowman & Littlefield Publishers, 2015.
- Skaff, Sheila. The Law of the Looking Glass: Cinema in Poland, 1896-1939. Ohio University Press, 2008.
