= Ten Percent for Me =

1933 Polish film

- Directed by: Juliusz Gardan
- Written by: Boleslaw Land
- Starring: Tola Mankiewiczówna; Tadeusz Wesolowski; Kazimierz Krukowski.
- Cinematography: Seweryn Steinwurzel
- Music by: Adam Rapacki
- Production company: Leo Film
- Release date: 7 January 1933
- Running time: 88 minutes
- Country: Poland
- Language: Polish

Ten Percent for Me (Polish: Dziesiec procent dla mnie) is a 1933 Polish comedy film directed by Juliusz Gardan and starring Tola Mankiewiczówna, Tadeusz Wesolowski and Kazimierz Krukowski. The film's sets were designed by the art director Stefan Norris.

== Cast ==
- Tola Mankiewiczówna as Zosia Grzybkówna
- Tadeusz Wesolowski as Janek, her beau
- Kazimierz Krukowski as Lopek, the hustler
- Janina Janecka as Mother Grzybkowa
- Wladyslaw Walter as Walery Grzybek
- Zofia Czaplinska as Mme. Patyk-Rossigol
- Tadeusz Fijewski as Hotel Pageboy
- Alma Kar as Dzunia, a boarder
- Juliusz Luszczewski as Zdzis, a boarder
- Józef Orwid as Leopold, a notar
- Czeslaw Skonieczny as Niebieski ptak
- Ludwik Fritsche as Unknown role

== Bibliography ==
- Ford, Charles & Hammond, Robert. Polish Film: A Twentieth Century History. McFarland, 2005.
- Haltof, Marek. Historical Dictionary of Polish Cinema. Rowman & Littlefield Publishers, 2015.
- Skaff, Sheila. The Law of the Looking Glass: Cinema in Poland, 1896-1939. Ohio University Press, 2008.
