= Stefan Hnydziński =

Polish actor (1901–1939)

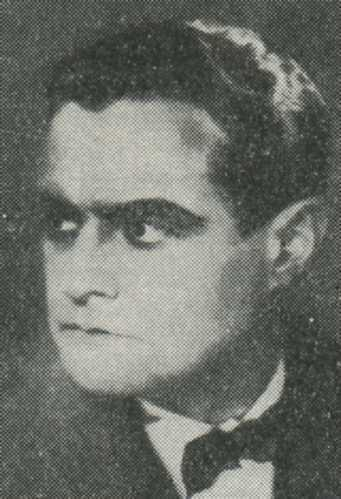
- Born: 29 July 1901; Przemyśl, Galicia and Lodomeria, Cisleithania, Austria-Hungary (now Poland)
- Died: 2 October 1939 (aged 38); Warsaw, Poland
- Occupation: Actor
- Years active: 1926-1939

Stefan Hnydziński (29 July 1901 – 2 October 1939) was a Polish film actor. He appeared in more than 25 films from 1926 to 1939. Hnydziński died of wounds sustained during the bombing of Warsaw in 1939.

== Selected filmography ==
- The Call of the Sea (1927)
- The Story of Sin (1933)
- Dodek na froncie (1936)
- Bohaterowie Sybiru (1936)
- Róża (1936)
- The Girls from Nowolipki (1937)
- Miss Minister Is Dancing (1937)
- Kobiety nad przepaścią (1938)
- Second Youth (1938)
- Gehenna (1938)
- Złota Maska (1939)
- Krystyna's Lie (1939)
