= Elżbieta Barszczewska =

Polish stage and film actress

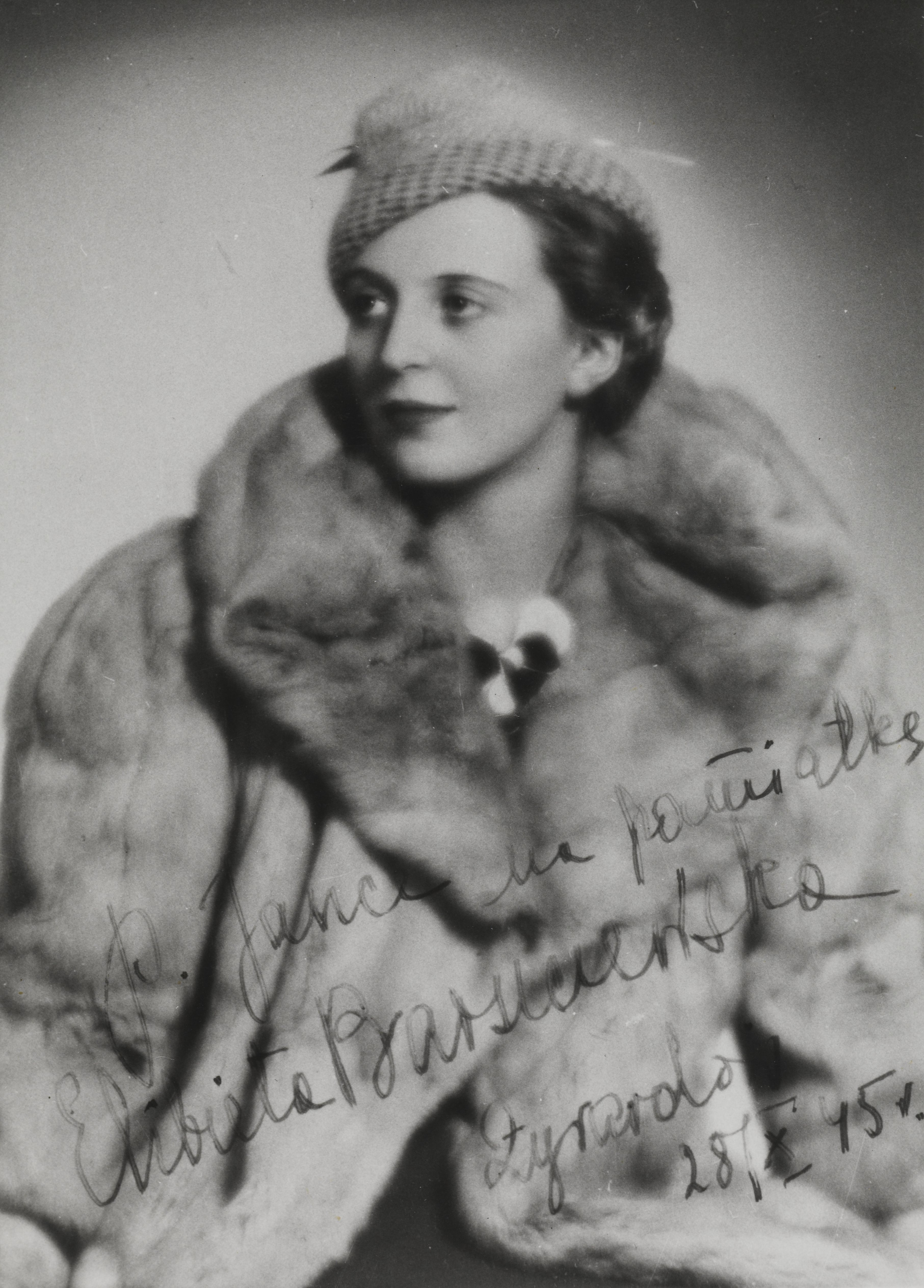
- Born: 29 November 1913; Warsaw, Congress Poland
- Died: 14 October 1987 (aged 73); Warsaw, Poland
- Resting place: Powązki Cemetery
- Years active: 1934–1981
- Spouse: Marian Wyrzykowski
- Children: Juliusz Wyrzykowski

Elżbieta Maria Barszczewska-Wyrzykowska (29 November 1913 – 14 October 1987) was a Polish stage and film actress.

After graduating Państwowy Instytut Sztuki Teatralnej, she debuted in Polish Theatre in Warsaw in 1934. She also starred in several movie roles, including 13 major ones. In occupied Poland, she took part in the activities of the underground theater. After the war she resumed work with the Polish Theater and the National Theatre. She was a mother of Juliusz Wyrzykowski.

== Selected filmography ==
- The Leper (1936)
- Pan Twardowski (1936)
- Znachor (1937)
- The Girls from Nowolipki (1937)
- Ostatnia brygada (1938)
- Profesor Wilczur
- Kościuszko pod Racławicami
- The Line (1938)
- The Three Hearts (1939)
- Krystyna's Lie (1939)
- Geniusz sceny
- Rytm serca (1977)
