= Is Lucyna a Girl? =

1934 film

- Directed by: Juliusz Gardan
- Written by: Juliusz Gardan; Mieczyslaw Krawicz; Konrad Tom
- Starring: Jadwiga Smosarska; Eugeniusz Bodo; Mieczyslawa Cwiklinska
- Cinematography: Zbigniew Gniazdowski
- Music by: Henry Vars
- Production company: Blok-Muzafilm
- Release date: 19 September 1934
- Running time: 80 minutes
- Country: Poland
- Language: Polish

Is Lucyna a Girl? (Polish: Czy Lucyna to dziewczyna?) is a 1934 Polish comedy film directed by Juliusz Gardan and starring Jadwiga Smosarska, Eugeniusz Bodo and Mieczyslawa Cwiklinska. The film's sets were designed by the art directors Stefan Norris and Jacek Rotmil.

== Cast ==
- Jadwiga Smosarska as Lucyna Bortnowska/Julian Kwiatkowski
- Eugeniusz Bodo as Engineer Stefan Zarnowski
- Mieczyslawa Cwiklinska as Countess Renata Czerminska
- Wladyslaw Grabowski as Amadeusz Maria de Witz
- Zygmunt Chmielewski as Pawel Bortnowski - Lucyna's Father
- Kazimiera Skalska as Tunia Zmijewska
- Pawel Owerllo as Braun - Factory Director
- Zofia Czaplinska as Malgosia - Lucyna's Nanny

== Bibliography ==
- Ford, Charles & Hammond, Robert. Polish Film: A Twentieth Century History. McFarland, 2005.
- Haltof, Marek. Historical Dictionary of Polish Cinema. Rowman & Littlefield Publishers, 2015.
- Skaff, Sheila. The Law of the Looking Glass: Cinema in Poland, 1896-1939. Ohio University Press, 2008.
