= Doctor Murek =

1939 film

- Directed by: Juliusz Gardan
- Written by: Tadeusz Dołęga-Mostowicz; Juliusz Gardan
- Based on: Doktor Murek zredukowany and Drugie życie doktora Murka by Tadeusz Dołęga-Mostowicz
- Starring: Franciszek Brodniewicz; Nora Ney; Jadwiga Andrzejewska
- Cinematography: Seweryn Steinwurzel
- Music by: Władysław Szpilman
- Production company: Parlo Film
- Release date: April 9, 1939 (Poland)
- Running time: 91 minutes
- Country: Poland
- Language: Polish

Doctor Murek(Polish: Doktór Murek) is a 1939 Polish drama film directed by Juliusz Gardan and starring Franciszek Brodniewicz, Nora Ney and Jadwiga Andrzejewska. It was shot at the Falanga Studios in Warsaw with sets designed by the art director Jacek Rotmil. The film is based on two novels by Tadeusz Dołęga-Mostowicz.

== Cast ==
- Franciszek Brodniewicz as Doctor Franciszek Murek
- Nora Ney as Arleta
- Jadwiga Andrzejewska as Mika
- Janina Wilczówna as Nira
- Ina Benita as Karolka
- Lidia Wysocka as Tunka Czabran
- Aleksander Zelwerowicz as chairman Jacek Czabran
- Mieczysława Ćwiklińska as Mrs. Czabran
- Kazimierz Junosza-Stępowski as chairman Jaźwicz
- Bronisław Dardziński as Kuzyk
- Maria Żabczynska as Kuzyk's wife
- Tadeusz Kański as Black Kazik
- Jerzy Kaliszewski as Jurek Czolkowski
- Stanisław Sielański as Cipak, shelter pal
- Wanda Jarszewska as the fortune-teller

== Bibliography ==
- Haltof, Marek. Historical Dictionary of Polish Cinema. Rowman & Littlefield Publishers, 2015.
- Skaff, Sheila. The Law of the Looking Glass: Cinema in Poland, 1896-1939. Ohio University Press, 2008.
