= Halka (1937 film) =

1937 film

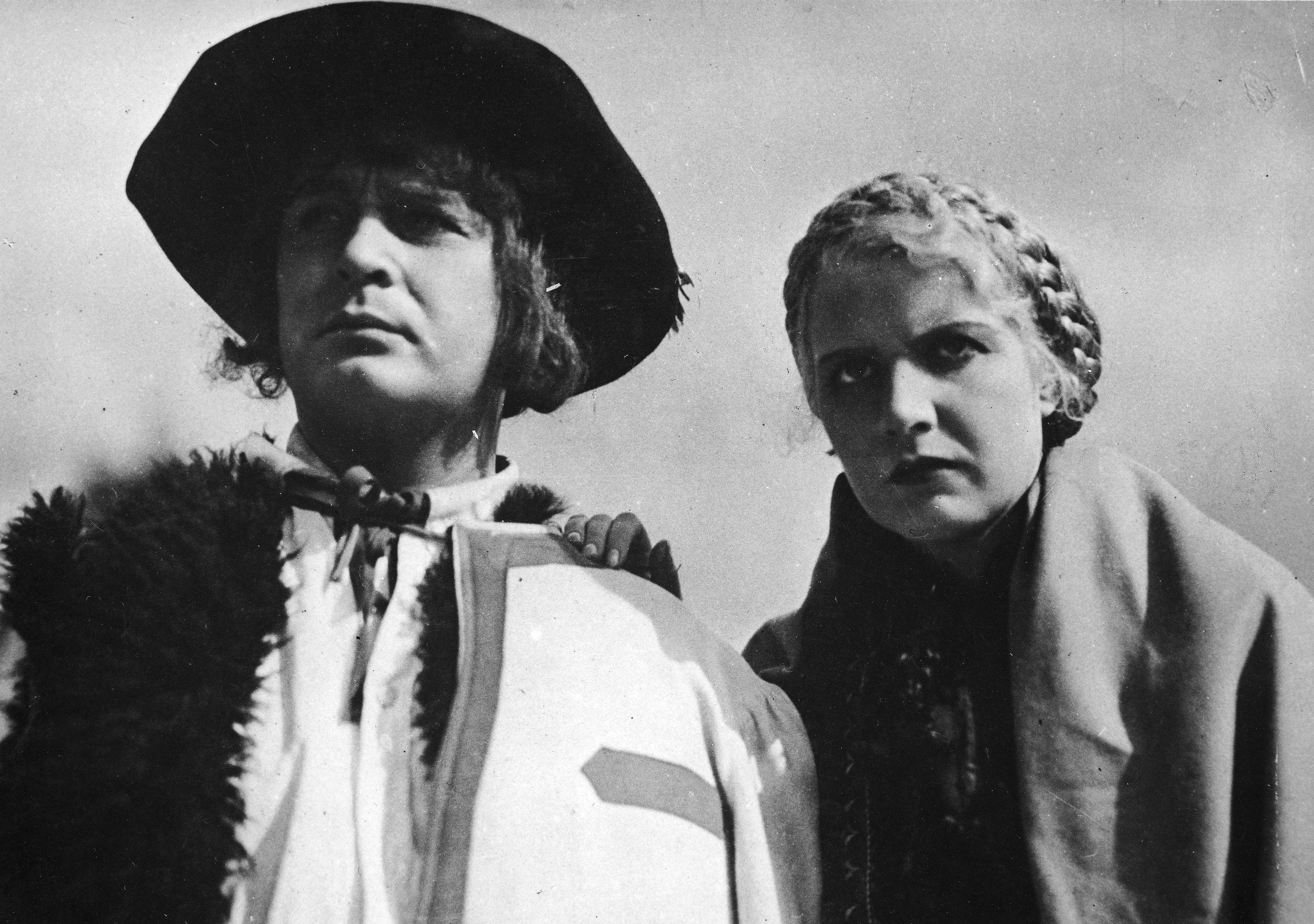
- Directed by: Juliusz Gardan
- Written by: Włodzimierz Wolski (libretto); Jarosław Iwaszkiewicz
- Starring: Liliana Zielinska; Witold Zacharewicz; Władyslaw Ladis-Kiepura; Janina Wilczówna
- Cinematography: Jakob Jonilowicz; Albert Wywerka
- Production company: Rex-Film
- Release date: 2 December 1937
- Running time: 86 minutes
- Country: Poland
- Language: Polish

Halka is a 1937 Polish musical film directed by Juliusz Gardan and starring Liliana Zielinska, Witold Zacharewicz and Władysław Kiepura. It is an adaptation of the 1848 opera Halka composed by Stanisław Moniuszko with a libretto by Włodzimierz Wolski. It was shot at the Falanga Studios in Warsaw.

== Main cast ==
- Liliana Zielińska as Halka
  - Ewa Bandrowska-Turska as Halka (singing voice)
- Witold Zacharewicz as Janusz
- Władyslaw Ladis-Kiepura as Jontek
- Janina Wilczówna as Zofia
- Jerzy Leszczyński as Stolnik
- Stanisław Grolicki as Damazy
- Leokadia Pancewicz-Leszczyńska as Janusz's Mother
- Bolesław Bolko as Szlachcic
- Ludwik Fritsche as Maciej, a servant

== Bibliography ==
- Skaff, Sheila. The Law of the Looking Glass: Cinema in Poland, 1896-1939. Ohio University Press, 2008.
