= The Woman Who Desires Sin =

1929 film

- Directed by: Wiktor Biegański
- Written by: Wiktor Biegański
- Produced by: Wiktor Biegański
- Starring: Carlotta Bologna; Tadeusz Wenden; Stefan Łada; Nora Ney
- Cinematography: Seweryn Steinwurzel; Antoni Wawrzyniak
- Release date: 22 November 1929
- Country: Poland
- Languages: Silent; Polish intertitles

The Woman Who Desires Sin (Polish: Kobieta, która grzechu pragnie) is a 1929 Polish silent crime film directed by Wiktor Biegański and starring Carlotta Bologna, Tadeusz Wenden and Stefan Łada. It was less popular with critics than some of Bieganski's earlier films.

== Cast ==
- Carlotta Bologna as Irena Parecka
- Tadeusz Wenden as Ing. Janusz Stoma
- Stefan Łada as Witold Tyński
- Nora Ney as Maryna
- Oktawian Kaczanowski as Tadeusz Parecki, Irena's father
- Jerzy Jabłoński as Agent policyjny
- Alma Kar as Wanda, Irena's friend
- Alojzy Kłyko as Kuba
- Wacław Korwin as Sędzia śledczy
- Włodzimierz Metelski as Ryszard Zychoń

== Bibliography ==
- Haltof, Marek. Polish National Cinema. Berghahn Books, 2002.
