= Stefan Kiedrzyński =

Polish writer and essayist

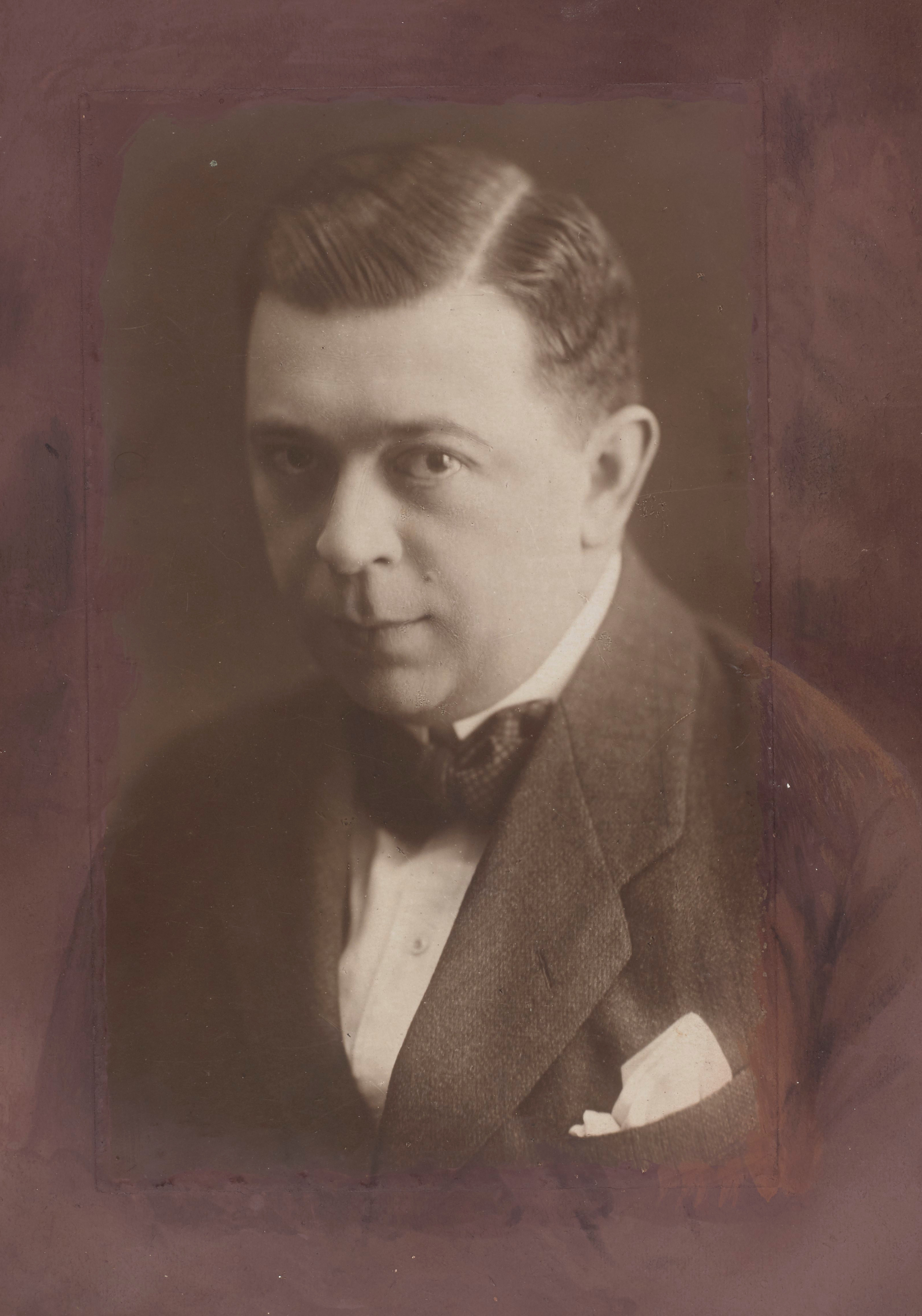
Stefan Kiedrzyński

Stefan Kiedrzyński (1888–1943) was a Polish writer and essayist. He published several novels and screenplays, mainly comedies.

== Screenwriting ==
Kiedrzyński is credited as the screenwriter for the films The Call of the Sea (1927). The films A Heart on the Street (1931) and Krystyna's Lie were based on two of his novels.
