= Heather (film) =

1938 film

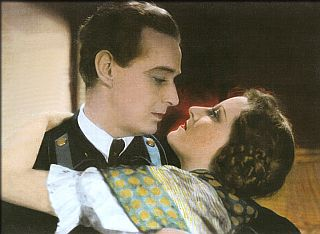
- Directed by: Juliusz Gardan
- Written by: Juliusz Gardan; Alfred Niemirski
- Based on: Wrzos by Maria Rodziewiczówna
- Produced by: Alfred Niemirski
- Starring: Stanisława Angel-Engelówna; Franciszek Brodniewicz; Hanna Brzezińska; Mieczysław Cybulski
- Cinematography: Jakub Joniłowicz
- Music by: Władysław Szpilman
- Production company: Elektra Film
- Release date: 16 April 1938
- Running time: 96 minutes
- Country: Poland
- Language: Polish

Heather (Polish: Wrzos) is a 1938 Polish melodrama film directed by Juliusz Gardan and starring Stanisława Angel-Engelówna, Franciszek Brodniewicz and Mieczysław Cybulski. The film's sets were designed by the art directors Stefan Norris and Jacek Rotmil. It is based on the novel by Maria Rodziewiczówna.

== Cast ==
- Stanisława Angel-Engelówna as Kazia
- Franciszek Brodniewicz as Andrzej Sanicki
- Hanna Brzezińska as Celina
- Mieczysław Cybulski as Stach Boguski
- Mieczysława Ćwiklińska as Ramszycowa
- Stanisława Wysocka as Stach's grandmother
- Kazimierz Junosza-Stępowski as Sanicki, Andrzej's father
- Aleksander Zelwerowicz as Kazia's father
- Lidia Wysocka as Dębska
- Leszek Pośpiełowski as Radlicz
- Janina Janecka as Kazia's stepmother
- Władysław Grabowski as count Kołocki
- Wanda Jarszewska as Wolska

== Bibliography ==
- Haltof, Marek. Historical Dictionary of Polish Cinema. Rowman & Littlefield Publishers, 2015.
- Skaff, Sheila. The History of Cinema in Poland and the Transition from Silent to Sound Film, 1896-1939. University of Michigan, 2004.
