= Stanisław Grolicki =

Polish actor

- Born: 2 February 1892; Kraków, Galicia, Austria-Hungary
- Died: 1 February 1947 (aged 54); Łódź, Poland
- Occupation: Actor

Stanisław Grolicki (2 February 1892 – 1 February 1947) was a Polish film actor.

== Selected filmography ==
- Prokurator Alicja Horn (1933)
- Bohaterowie Sybiru (1936)
- Daddy Gets Married (1936)
- Znachor (1937)
- Halka (1937)
- Florian (1938)
- Profesor Wilczur (1938)
- At the End of the Road (1939)
- The Three Hearts (1939)
- The Vagabonds (1939)
- To Happiness Through Tears (1941)

== Bibliography ==
- Skaff, Sheila. The Law of the Looking Glass: Cinema in Poland, 1896-1939. Ohio University Press, 2008.
