= Kazimierz Junosza-Stępowski =

Polish actor (1880–1943)

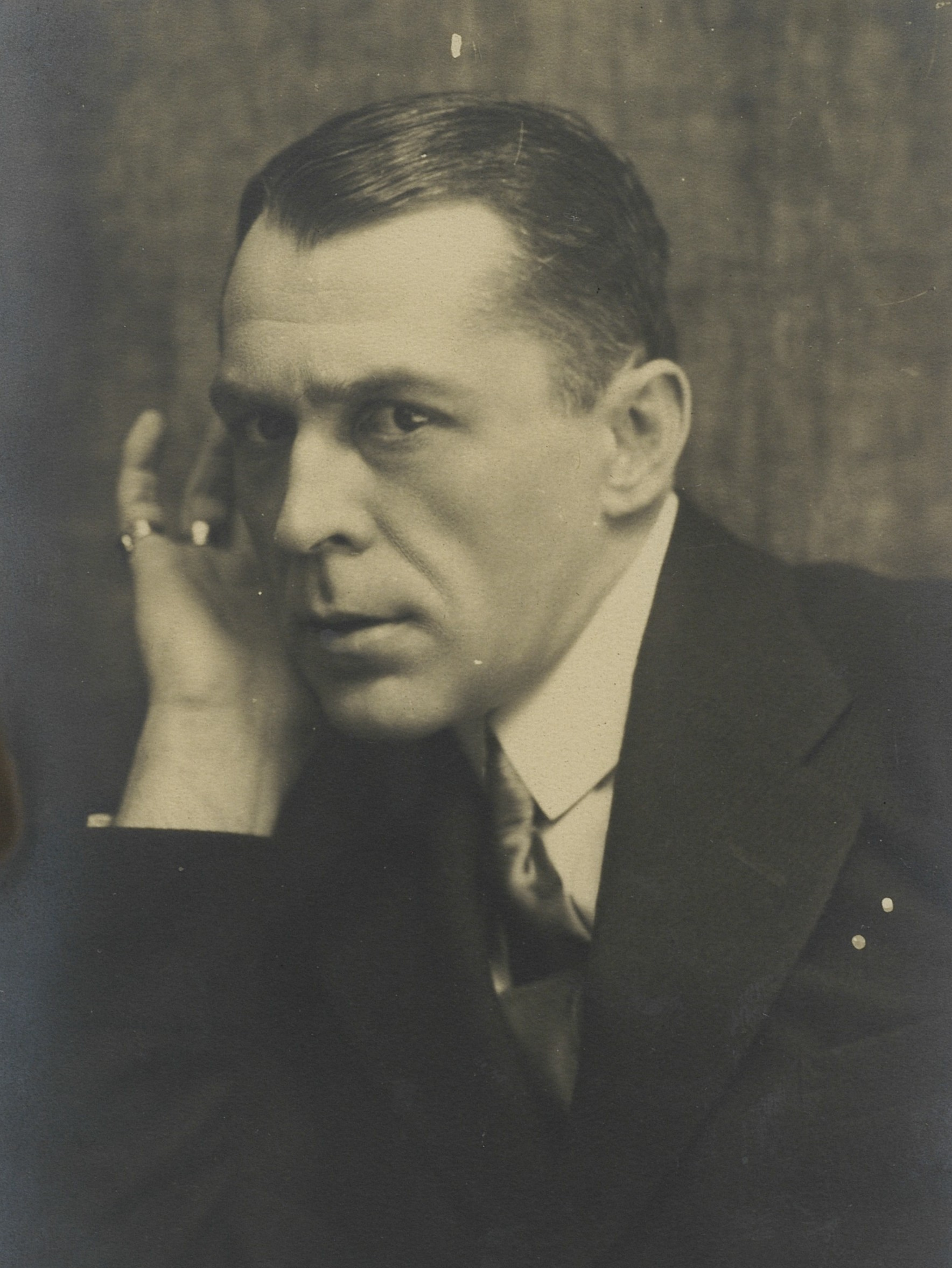
- Kazimierz Junosza-Stepowski
- Born: 26 November 1880; Venice, Italy
- Died: 5 July 1943 (aged 62); Warsaw, Occupied Poland
- Cause of death: Execution by shooting
- Occupations: Film actor Stage actor
- Years active: 1902–1939 (film)
- Relatives: Jaga Juno (wife)

Kazimierz Junosza-Stępowski (26 November 1880 – 5 July 1943) was a Polish stage and film actor. He was a legendary figure in Polish cinema who had appeared in the earliest Polish films in 1902. Junosza-Stępowski was killed while trying to protect his wife from members of the Polish Home Army, who had discovered she was an informer for the Gestapo.

He was married twice. His first wife was Helena Jankowska (d. 1915). In 1922 he married Iza Galewska.

== Selected filmography ==
- Uwiedziona (1931)
- The Story of Sin (1933)
- Córka generała Pankratowa (1934)
- Młody las (1934)
- Kochaj tylko mnie (1935)
- Pan Twardowski (1936)
- Bohaterowie Sybiru (1936)
- Róża (1936)
- The Leper (1936)
- Wierna rzeka (1936)
- Count Michorowski (1937)
- Znachor (1937)
- The Girls from Nowolipki (1937)
- Profesor Wilczur (1938)
- Kobiety nad przepaścią (1938)
- Ostatnia brygada (1938)
- Second Youth (1938)
- Rena (1938)
- Florian (1938)
- Heather (1938)
- Sygnaly (1938)
- Doktór Murek (1939)
- At the End of the Road (1939)
- Krystyna's Lie (1939)

== Bibliography ==
- Haltof, Marek. Polish Film and the Holocaust: Politics and Memory. Berghahn Books, 2012.
- Skaff, Sheila. The Law of the Looking Glass: Cinema in Poland, 1896–1939. Ohio University Press, 2008.
