= Tadeusz Fijewski =

Polish actor

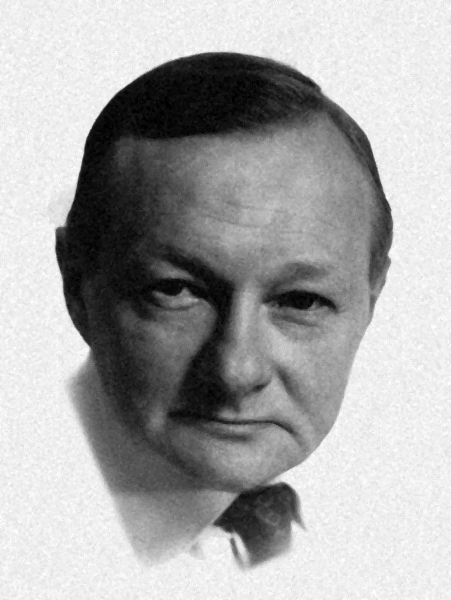
- Tadeusz Fijewski (1969)
- Born: 14 July 1911; Warsaw, Congress Poland
- Died: 12 November 1978 (aged 67); Warsaw, Poland
- Occupation: Actor
- Years active: 1927-1978
- Spouse: Helena Makowska-Fijewska

Tadeusz Fijewski (14 July 1911 – 12 November 1978) was a Polish stage and film actor. He appeared in 50 films between 1927 and 1978.

== Selected filmography ==
- The Call of the Sea (1927)
- The Final Touch (1928)
- Przedwiosnie (1928)
- Pod banderą miłości (1929)
- A Strong Man (1929)
- The Beauty of Life (1930)
- Prokurator Alicja Horn (1933)
- Ten Percent for Me (1933)
- Młody Las (1934)
- Córka generała Pankratowa (1934)
- Granny Had No Worries (1935)
- Two Joasias (1935)
- Znachor (1937)
- Three Troublemakers (1937)
- Pawel i Gawel (1938)
- Krystyna's Lie (1939)
- Border Street (1948)
- Nikodem Dyzma (1956)
- Kapelusz pana Anatola (1957)
- Pan Anatol szuka miliona (1958)
- Pętla aka The Noose (1958)
- Inspekcja pana Anatola (1959)
- The Impossible Goodbye (1962)
- Black Wings (1963)
- The First Day of Freedom (1964)
- Three Steps on Earth (1965)
- Lenin in Poland (1966)
- The Doll (1968)
- Czterej pancerni i pies (1966-1970)
- Kamizelka (1971)
- Na przelaj (1972)
- Chlopi (1972)
- Peasants (1973)
- Wiosna, panie sierzancie (1974)
- Nights and Days (Noce i dnie) (1975)
- Kazimierz Wielki (1976)
- Pelnia (1979)
