= Henryk Szaro =

Polish screenwriter and film director

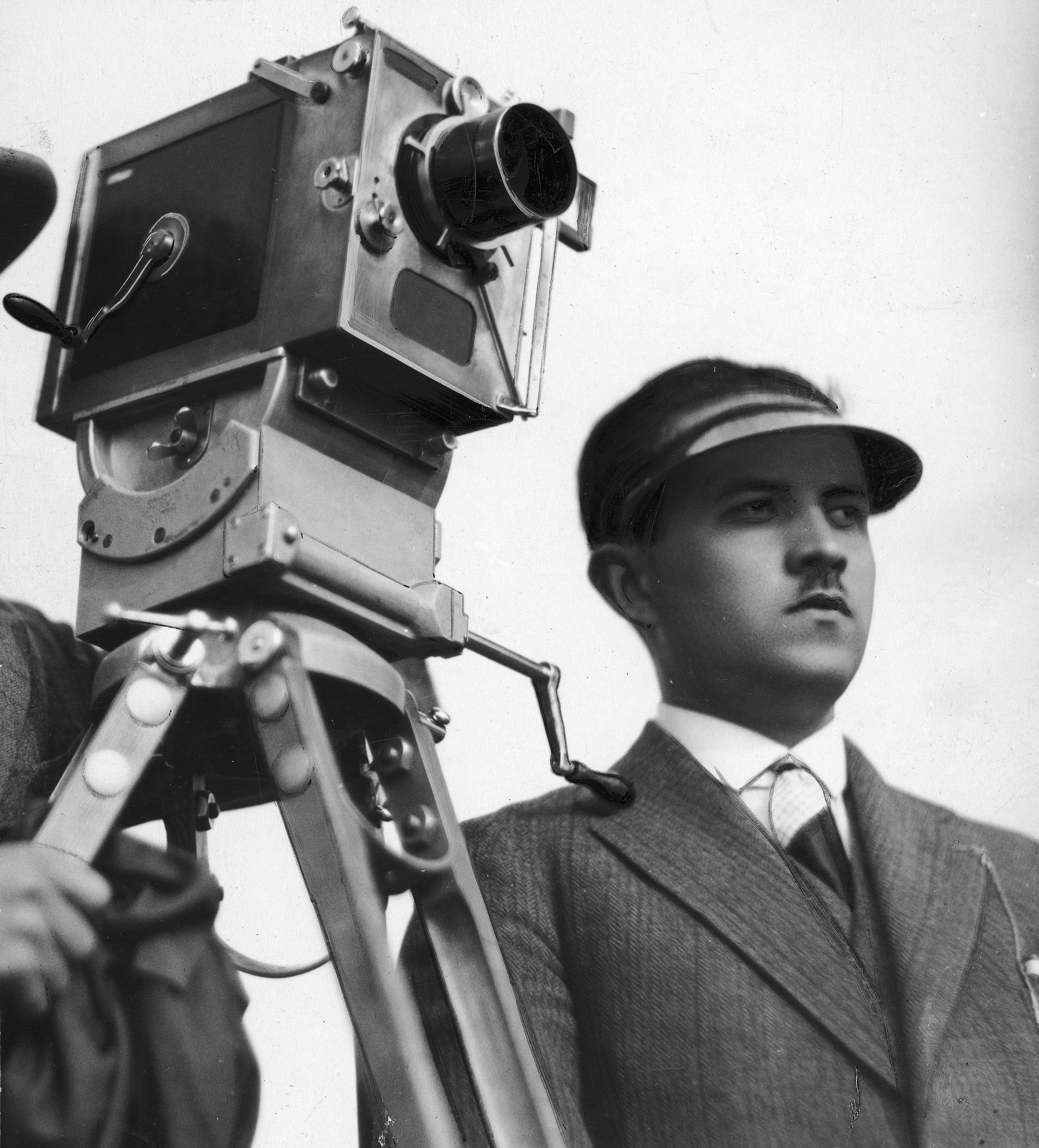
- Szaro in 1931.
- Born: 23 October 1900; Warsaw, Russian Empire
- Died: 8 August 1942 (aged 41); Warsaw, Occupied Poland
- Other name: Henoch Szapiro
- Occupations: Film director Screenwriter
- Years active: 1925–1939

Henryk Szaro (1900 – 1942) was a Polish screenwriter and film director. He was born Henoch Szapiro, of Jewish background. He became a leading Polish director of the late 1920 and 1930s. Szaro was killed in the Warsaw Ghetto in 1942 during the German Occupation of Poland in the Second World War.

== Selected filmography ==
=== Director ===
- Rivals (1925)
- The Call of the Sea (1927)
- The Wild Girl (1928)
- A Strong Man (1929)
- Exile to Siberia (1930)
- The Story of Sin (1933)
- Pan Twardowski (1936)
- Count Michorowski (1937)
- The Vow (1937)
- Three Troublemakers (1937)
- Krystyna's Lie (1939)

== Bibliography ==
- Haltof, Marek. Polish Film and the Holocaust: Politics and Memory. Berghahn Books, 2012.
- Skaff, Sheila. The Law of the Looking Glass: Cinema in Poland, 1896-1939. Ohio University Press, 2008.
