= Szymon Kataszek =

Polish composer

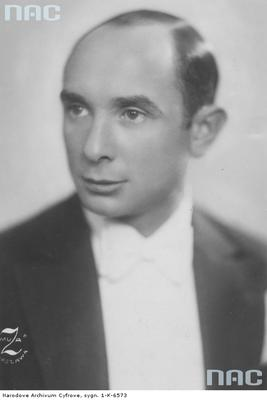
Szymon Kataszek c.1930-33 (National Digital Archive, Poland)

Szymon Kataszek (1898–1943) (born Boruch Szymon Kataszek), was a Polish-Jewish composer, bandleader, pianist, a pioneer of Polish jazz. Born in Warsaw 1898; studied piano at the Warsaw Music Institute and Rome's St. Cecilia Academy. He returned to Poland and first worked as an organist in St. Trinity Church, while also playing piano in nightclubs.

== Life and work ==
In 1920 he joined the Polish Army and fought in the Polish-Bolshevik War. In 1921 he played in dance orchestras in Gdańsk and Berlin, then returned to Warsaw and established a jazz quintet with his friend Zygmunt Karasiński; they played at the nightclub Oaza. In 1924 the Krasiński & Kataszek Band recorded for Syrena and toured.

Kataszek composed dozens of Polish foxtrots, black-bottoms, shimmies, and Charlestons often performed at the small night spots of Warsaw: Qui Pro Quo, Perskie Oko, and Rex - they included A ile mi dasz? (What Can I Get From You?), To Zula W futerko się otula (Here's Zula, Wrapped In Furs) written for the Charleston pioneer and Qui Pro Quo singer, Zula Pogorzelska, and Abram, ja ci zagram! (I'll Play It For You, Abram!). His tango Czemuś o mnie zapomniał? (Why Have You Forgotten Me?) received the 1932 Tango Competition Grand Prix. In 1933 he and Karasiński wrote two "schlagers" (hits) for the comedy film Każdemu wolno kochać: the rumba Chcesz to mnie bierz" (Take Me, If You Feel Like It) and the Każdemu wolno kochać (Everybody Has A Right To Love). Kataszek was chairman of the "Society For Workless Musicians" instituting a rule forcing all artists' unions in Poland to earmark 20% of radio performance income for unemployed musicians.

When World War II began, Kataszek left Warsaw for Lviv, which was under Soviet occupation; when in June 1941 the Soviet-German war erupted, he returned to Warsaw and entered the Warsaw Ghetto. He led the Jewish Ghetto Police Orchestra. When deportations to Treblinka and Bełżec started, he escaped to the "Aryan" side of the wall and went back to Lviv. He went back to bandleading but was recognised by an SS officer, arrested, sent to Pawiak prison in the Warsaw Ghetto, and shot on 22 May 1943.
