= List of Polish films of the 1930s =

List of films produced in the Cinema of Poland in the 1930s.

== 1930 ==
| Title | Director | Cast | Genre | Notes |
|---|---|---|---|---|
| The Beauty of Life | Juliusz Gardan | Adam Brodzisz, Boguslaw Samborski, Nora Ney | Drama | |
| Exile to Siberia | Henryk Szaro | Adam Brodzisz, Jadwiga Smosarska, Mira Zimińska | Historical drama | |
| Gwiazdzista eskadra | Leonard Buczkowski | | | |
| Janko Muzykant | Ryszard Ordyński | | | |
| Kult ciała | Michał Waszyński | | | |
| Mascotte | Aleksander Ford | | | |
| Narodziny gazety | Aleksander Ford | | | |
| Niebezpieczny romans | Michał Waszyński | Bogusław Samborski, Helena Stepowska, Józef Orski, Betty Amann, Eugeniusz Bodo, Adolf Dymsza | | |
| Tetno Polskiego Manchester | Aleksander Ford | | | |

== 1931 ==
| Title | Director | Cast | Genre | Notes |
|---|---|---|---|---|
| Cham | Jan Nowina-Przybylski | | | |
| Dziś mamy bal | Jerzy Zarzycki | | | |
| A Heart on the Street | Juliusz Gardan | Nora Ney, Zbigniew Sawan, Ludwik Fritsche | Drama | |
| The Ten from Pawiak Prison | Ryszard Ordynski | Józef Wegrzyn, Karolina Lubienska, Adam Brodzisz | Thriller | |
| Tytoniówka | Jerzy Zarzycki | | | |
| Uwiedziona | Michał Waszyński | Maria Malicka, Kazimierz Junosza-Stępowski, Krystyna Ankwicz, Zbigniew Sawan, Tadeusz Olsza | | |

== 1932 ==
| Title | Director | Cast | Genre | Notes |
|---|---|---|---|---|
| Bezimienni bohaterowie | Michał Waszyński | | | |
| Głos pustyni | Michał Waszyński | | | |
| Halutzim | Aleksander Ford | | | |
| Księżna Łowicka | Mieczysław Krawicz | | | |
| Legion ulicy | Aleksander Ford | | | |
| The Palace on Wheels | Ryszard Ordynski | Karolina Lubienska, Igo Sym, Zbigniew Sawan | Drama | |
| Reportaż nr 2 | Jerzy Zarzycki | | | |
| The Sea | Wanda Jakubowska, Stanisław Wohl and Jerzy Zarzycki | | Documentary short | |
| Sto metrów miłości | Michał Waszyński | | | |
| Szyb L23 | Leonard Buczkowski | | | |
| Ułani, ułani, chłopcy malowani | Mieczysław Krawicz | | | |

== 1933 ==
| Title | Director | Cast | Genre | Notes |
|---|---|---|---|---|
| Dziesięć procent dla mnie | Juliusz Gardan | | | |
| Jego ekscelencja subiekt | Michał Waszyński | | | |
| Każdemu wolno kochać | Mieczysław Krawicz and Janusz Warnecki | | | |
| Life Sentence | Juliusz Gardan | Jadwiga Andrzejewska, Irena Eichlerówna, Loda Niemirzanka | Drama | |
| Noc listopadowa | Mieczysław Krawicz and Janusz Warnecki | | | |
| Prokurator Alicja Horn | Michał Waszyński | | | |
| The Story of Sin | Henryk Szaro | Karolina Lubienska, Maria Duleba, Ludwik Fritsche | Drama | |
| Ten Percent for Me | Juliusz Gardan | Tola Mankiewiczówna, Tadeusz Wesolowski, Kazimierz Krukowski | Comedy | |
| Ułan i dziewczyna | Henryk Szaro | | | |
| Zabawka | Michał Waszyński | | | |
| Szpieg w masce | Mieczysław Krawicz | | | |

== 1934 ==
| Title | Director | Cast | Genre | Notes |
|---|---|---|---|---|
| Budujemy | Wanda Jakubowska | | | |
| Czarna perła | Michał Waszyński | | | |
| Is Lucyna a Girl? | Juliusz Gardan | Jadwiga Smosarska, Eugeniusz Bodo, Mieczyslawa Cwiklinska | Comedy | |
| Córka generała Pankratowa | Mieczysław Znamierowski | | | |
| Kocha, lubi, szanuje | Michał Waszyński | | | |
| Młody las | Joseph Lejtes | | | |
| Parada rezerwistów | Michał Waszyński | | | |
| Pieśniarz Warszawy | Michał Waszyński | | | |
| Przebudzenie | Aleksander Ford, Wanda Jakubowska and Jan Nowina-Przybylski | | | |
| Przybłęda | Jan Nowina-Przybylski and Jan Rogoziński | | | |
| Świt, dzień i noc Palestyny | Henryk Bojm | | Documentary | |
| Co mój mąż robi w nocy? | Michał Waszyński | | | |
| Uhlan's Pledge | Mieczysław Krawicz | Witold Conti, Tola Mankiewiczówna, Franciszek Brodniewicz | Comedy | |

== 1935 ==
| Title | Director | Cast | Genre | Notes |
|---|---|---|---|---|
| ABC milości | Michał Waszyński | | | |
| Al Chet | Alexander Marten | | | In Yiddish |
| Antek policmajster | Michał Waszyński | | | |
| Dzień wielkiej przygody | Joseph Lejtes | | | |
| Jaśnie pan szofer | Michał Waszyński | | | |
| Jego wielka miłość | Mieczysław Krawicz | | | |
| Kochaj tylko mnie | Marta Flantz | Lidia Wysocka, Witold Zacharewicz, Kazimierz Junosza-Stępowski, Helena Grossówna | romantic comedy | |
| Manewry miłosne | Jan Nowina-Przybylski and Konrad Tom | | | |
| Nie miała baba kłopotu | Michał Waszyński and Aleksander Ford | | | |
| Panienka z poste-restante | Michał Waszyński | | | |
| Pogrzeb Marszałka Józefa Piłsudskiego 12-V-18-V 1935 | | | Documentary | Funeral of Józef Piłsudski |
| Rapsodia Bałtyku | Leonard Buczkowski, Jakub Orłowski and Aleksander Pękalski | | | |
| Two Joasias | Mieczysław Krawicz | Jadwiga Smosarska, Ina Benita, Franciszek Brodniewicz | Comedy | |
| Wacuś | Michał Waszyński | | | |

== 1936 ==
| Title | Director | Cast | Genre | Notes |
|---|---|---|---|---|
| August Mocny | Paul Wegener | Michael Bohnen, Lil Dagover | Historical | Co-production with Germany, separate versions |
| 30 karatów szczęścia | Michał Waszyński | | | |
| Ada! To nie wypada! | Konrad Tom | | | |
| American Adventure | Ryszard Ordynski | Eugeniusz Bodo, Zofia Nakoneczna, Mieczyslawa Cwiklinska | Musical comedy | |
| Bohaterowie Sybiru | Michał Waszyński | | | |
| Bolek i Lolek | Michał Waszyński | | | |
| Dodek na froncie | Michał Waszyński | | | |
| Droga młodych | Aleksander Ford | | | |
| Dwa dni w raju | Leon Trystan | | | |
| Fredek uszczęśliwia świat | Zbigniew Ziembiński | | | |
| The Haunted Manor | Leonard Buczkowski | Witold Conti, Helena Grossówna, Mieczyslawa Cwiklinska | Musical | |
| Jadzia | Mieczysław Krawicz | | | |
| The Leper | Juliusz Gardan | Elzbieta Barszczewska, Franciszek Brodniewicz, Tamara Wiszniewska | Romance | |
| Milość wszystko zwycięża | | | | |
| Pan Twardowski | Henryk Szaro | | | |
| Róża | Joseph Lejtes | Irena Eichlerówna, Witold Zacharewicz | Historical | |
| Papa się żeni | Michał Waszyński | Mira Zimińska, Lidia Wysocka, Jadwiga Andrzejewska, Franciszek Brodniewicz | comedy | |
| Tajemnica panny Brinx | Bazyli Sikiewicz | | | |
| Wacek na froncie | Leonard Buczkowski | | | |
| Wierna rzeka | | | | |
| Barbara Radziwiłłówna | Joseph Lejtes | | | |
| Będzie lepiej | Michał Waszyński | | | |
| Yidl Mitn Fidl | Joseph Green and Jan Nowina-Przybylski | | | |

== 1937 ==
| Title | Director | Cast | Genre | Notes |
|---|---|---|---|---|
| Count Michorowski | Henryk Szaro | Franciszek Brodniewicz, Tamara Wiszniewska, Mieczyslawa Cwiklinska | Drama | |
| A Diplomatic Wife | Carl Boese, Mieczysław Krawicz | Aleksander Żabczyński, Lena Zelichowska | Comedy | Co-production with Germany. German version Adventure in Warsaw was also released. |
| Dorożkarz nr. 13 | leading role by Polish Prince of comedy: Stanislaw Sielanski, Marian Czauski | | | |
| The Girls from Nowolipki | Joseph Lejtes | Elzbieta Barszczewska, Jadwiga Andrzejewska, Tamara Wiszniewska | Drama | |
| Halka | Juliusz Gardan | Liliana Zielinska, Witold Zacharewicz | Musical | |
| Królowa przedmieścia | Eugeniusz Bodo | | | |
| Książątko | Stanisław Szebego and Konrad Tom | | | |
| Ludzie Wisły | Aleksander Ford and Jerzy Zarzycki | | | |
| Miss Minister Is Dancing | Juliusz Gardan | Tola Mankiewiczówna, Aleksander Zabczynski, Józef Orwid | Comedy | |
| Niedorajda | Mieczysław Krawicz | | | |
| O czym marzą kobiety | Alexander Marten | | | |
| Pan redaktor szaleje | Jan Nowina-Przybylski | | | |
| Parada Warszawy | Hanka Ordonówna and Konrad Tom | | revue film | |
| Płomienne serca | | | | |
| Skłamałam | Mieczysław Krawicz | | | |
| Sztandar Wolnosci | | | | |
| Three Troublemakers | Henryk Szaro | Elzbieta Barszczewska, Lena Zelichowska, Jerzy Pichelski | Musical comedy | |
| Ty co w ostrej świecisz bramie | Jan Nowina-Przybylski | | | |
| Ulica Edisony | Wanda Jakubowska | | | |
| The Vow | Henryk Szaro | Zygmunt Turkow, Kurt Katch, Dina Halpern | Drama | |
| Weseli biedacy | Leon Jeannot | | | |
| Znachor | Michał Waszyński | | drama | |
| Dybuk | Michał Waszyński | | | |
| The Jester | Joseph Green and Jan Nowina-Przybylski | | | |

== 1938 ==
| Title | Director | Cast | Genre | Notes |
|---|---|---|---|---|
| Druga mlodość | Michał Waszyński | | | |
| Dziewczyna szuka miłości | Romuald Gantkowski | | | |
| Florian | Leonard Buczkowski | | | |
| Gehenna | Michał Waszyński | Lidia Wysocka, Witold Zacharewicz, Bogusław Samborski, Ina Benita | melodrama | |
| Heather | Juliusz Gardan | Stanisława Angel-Engelówna, Franciszek Brodniewicz, Mieczysław Cybulski | Drama | |
| Kobiety nad przepaścią | Michał Waszyński | | | |
| Kościuszko pod Racławicami | Joseph Lejtes | | | |
| Krawa rosa | | | | |
| The Line | Joseph Lejtes | Elzbieta Barszczewska, Lena Zelichowska, Jerzy Pichelski | Drama | |
| Mamele | Joseph Green and Konrad Tom | | | |
| Moi rodzice rozwodzą się | Mieczysław Krawicz | | | |
| Ostatnia brygada | Michał Waszyński | Zbigniew Sawan, Maria Gorczyńska, Elżbieta Barszczewska, Lidia Wysocka | | |
| Paweł i Gaweł | Mieczysław Krawicz | | | |
| Piętro wyżej | Leon Trystan | | | |
| Profesor Wilczur | Michał Waszyński | | | |
| Rena | Michał Waszyński | | | |
| Robert and Bertram | Michał Waszyński | Eugeniusz Bodo, Adolf Dymsza | Comedy | |
| Serce matki | Michał Waszyński | | | |
| Strachy | Eugeniusz Cekalski and Karol Szolowski | | | |
| Sygnały | Joseph Lejtes | | | |
| Szczęśliwa 13-ka | Marian Czauski | | | |
| Ułan księcia Józefa | Konrad Tom | | | |
| Za winy niepopełnione | Eugeniusz Bodo | | | |
| Zapomniana melodia | Jan Fethke and Konrad Tom | | | |

== 1939 ==
| Title | Director | Cast | Genre | Notes |
|---|---|---|---|---|
| A Brivele der Mamen | Joseph Green | | | |
| At the End of the Road | Michal Waszynski | Kazimierz Junosza-Stepowski, Irena Malkiewicz, Tamara Wiszniewska | Drama | |
| Bezdomni | Alexander Marten | | | |
| Biały Murzyn | Leonard Buczkowski | | | |
| Czarne diamenty | Jerzy Gabryelski | | | |
| Doctor Murek | Juliusz Gardan | Franciszek Brodniewicz, Nora Ney | Drama | |
| Ja tu rządzę | Mieczysław Krawicz | | | |
| Krystyna's Lie | Henryk Szaro | Elzbieta Barszczewska, Lena Zelichowska, Jerzy Pichelski | Drama | |
| A Sportsman Against His Will | Mieczyslaw Krawicz | Adolf Dymsza, Aleksander Zabczynski, Ina Benita | Comedy | Released in 1940 |
| The Vagabonds | Michał Waszyński | Kazimierz Wajda, Henryk Vogelfänger, Helena Grossówna | Comedy | |
| The Three Hearts | Michał Waszyński | Jerzy Pichelski, Aleksander Żabczyński, Elżbieta Barszczewska | Romantic Comedy | |
| To Happiness Through Tears | Jan Fethke | Irena Malkiewicz, Franciszek Brodniewicz, Mieczyslawa Cwiklinska | Drama | Released in 1941 |
| Żołnierz królowej Madagaskaru | | | | |
| Żona i nie żona | | | | |
