= List of Polish films in the interwar period =

Poland existed as a state for the first time in over a hundred years with the proclamation of the Second Polish Republic in 1918. This state lasted until Poland was invaded and partitioned by Nazi Germany and the Soviet Union in the fall of 1939.

== 1910s ==
- Carska faworyta (1918)
- Książę Józef Poniatowski (1918)
- Rozporek i Ska (1918)
- Sezonowa miłość (1918)
- Corka Pani X (1919)
- Carewicz (1919)
- Kobieta, która widziała śmierć (1919)
- Ludzie bez jutra (1919)
- Panna po wojnie (1919)

== 1920s ==
- The Jews in Poland (1920)
- Pan Twardowski (1921) – directed by Wiktor Biegański
- Uroda zycia (1921) – directed by Eugeniusz Modzelewski and William Wauer
- Otchlan pokuty (1922) – directed by Wiktor Biegański
- Strzal (1922) – directed by Danny Kaden, Władysław Lenczewski
- Tajemnica przystanku tramwajowego (1922) – directed by Leon Trystan
- Zazdrosc (1922) – directed by Wiktor Biegański
- The Idol (1923) – directed by Wiktor Biegański
- Niewolnica milosci (1923) – directed by Jan Kucharski, Stanislaw Szebego and Adam Zagórski
- Tkies khaf (1924) (in Yiddish) – directed by Zygmund Turkow
- Iwonka (1925) – directed by Emil Chaberski
- Czerwony blazen (1926) – directed by Henryk Szaro
- Tredowata (1926) – directed by Boleslaw Mierzejewski and Edvard Pukhalsky
- Bunt krwi i zelaza (1927) – directed by Leon Trystan
- Kochanka Szamoty (1927) – directed by Leon Trystan
- Orle (1927) – directed by Wiktor Biegański
- Ziemia obiecana (1927) – directed by Zygmund Turkow and Aleksander Hertz
- Dzikuska (1928) – directed by Henryk Szaro
- Huragan (1928) – directed by Joseph Lejtes
- Kropka nad i (1928) – directed by Juliusz Gardan
- Liebeshölle (1928) – directed by Wiktor Biegański
- Pan Tadeusz (1928)- directed by Ryszard Ordynski
- Przedwiosnie (1928) – directed by Henryk Szaro
- Szalency (1928) – directed by Leonard Buczkowski
- Kult ciala (1929) – directed by Michał Waszyński
- Mocny czlowiek (1929) – directed by Henryk Szaro
- Nad Radem (1929) – directed by Aleksander Ford

== 1930s ==
=== 1930–1934 ===
- Exile to Siberia (1930) – directed by Henryk Szaro
- Gwiazdzista eskadra (1930) – directed by Leonard Buczkowski (lost film)
- Janko Muzykant (1930) – directed by Ryszard Ordynski
- Mascotte (1930) – directed by Aleksander Ford
- Narodziny gazety (1930) – directed by Aleksander Ford
- Niebezpieczny romans (1930) – directed by Michał Waszyński
- Tetno Polskiego Manchestern (1930) – directed by Aleksander Ford
- Cham (1931) – directed by Jan Nowina-Przybylski
- Dziś mamy bal (1931) – directed by Jerzy Zarzycki
- Tytoniówka (1931) – directed by Jerzy Zarzycki
- Uwiedziona (1931) – directed by Michał Waszyński
- Bezimienni bohaterowie (1932) – directed by Michał Waszyński
- Dziesięciu z Pawiaka (1932) – directed by Ryszard Ordynski
- Głos pustyni (1932)- directed by Michał Waszyński
- Halutzim (1932)- directed by Aleksander Ford
- Księżna Łowicka (Noc listopadowa) (1932) – directed by Mieczysław Krawicz and Janusz Warnecki
- Legion ulicy (1932) – directed by Aleksander Ford
- Morze (1932) – directed by Wanda Jakubowska, Stanisław Wohl and Jerzy Zarzycki
- Reportaż nr 2 (1932) – directed by Jerzy Zarzycki
- Sto metrów miłosci (1932) – directed by Michał Waszyński
- Szyb L23 (1932) – directed by Leonard Buczkowski
- Dzieje grzechu (1933) – directed by Henryk Szaro
- Dziesięć procent dla mnie (1933) – directed by Juliusz Gardan
- Jego ekscelencja subiekt (1933) – directed by Michał Waszyński
- Każdemu wolno kochać (1933) – directed by Mieczysław Krawicz and Janusz Warnecki
- Prokurator Alicja Horn (1933) – directed by Michał Waszyński
- Romeo i Julcia (1933) – directed by Jan Nowina-Przybylski
- Ułan i dziewczyna (1933) – directed by Henryk Szaro
- Wyrok życia (1933) – directed by Juliusz Gardan
- Zabawka (1933) – directed by Michał Waszyński
- Szpieg w masce (1933) – directed by Mieczysław Krawicz
- Budujemy (1934) – directed by Wanda Jakubowska
- Czarna perła (1934) – directed by Michał Waszyński
- Czy Lucyna to dziewczyna (1934) – directed by Juliusz Gardan
- Córka generała Pankratowa (1934) – directed by Mieczyslaw Znamierowski
- Kocha, lubi, szanuje (1934) – directed by Michał Waszyński
- Młody las (1934) – directed by Joseph Lejtes
- Parada rezerwistów (1934) – directed by Michał Waszyński
- Piesniarz Warszawy (1934) – directed by Michał Waszyński
- Przebudzenie (1934) – directed by Aleksander Ford, Wanda Jakubowska and Jan Nowina-Przybylski
- Przybłęda (1934) – directed by Jan Nowina-Przybylski and Jan Rogozinski
- Śluby ułańskie (1934) – directed by Mieczysław Krawicz
- Świt, dzień i noc Palestyny (1934) – directed by Henryk Bojm
- Co mój mąż robi w nocy (1934) – directed by Michał Waszyński

=== 1935–1939 ===
- ABC miłości (1935) – directed by Michał Waszyński
- Al Chet (1935) – directed by Alexander Marten
- Antek policmajster (1935) directed by Michał Waszyński
- Dwie Joasie (1935) – directed by Mieczysław Krawicz
- Dzień wielkiej przygody (1935) – directed by Joseph Lejtes
- Jaśnie pan szofer (1935) – directed by Michał Waszyński
- Jego wielka miłość (1935) – directed by Mieczysław Krawicz
- Kochaj tylko mnie (1935) – directed by Marta Flantz
- Manewry miłosne (1935) – directed by Jan Nowina-Przybylski and Konrad Tom
- Nie miała baba kłopotu (1935) – directed by Michał Waszyński and Aleksander Ford
- Panienka z poste-restante (1935) – directed by Michał Waszyński
- Pogrzeb Marszalka Józefa Pilsudskiego 12-V-18-V 1935 (1935) (documentary of Józef Pilsudski funeral)
- Rapsodia Bałtyku (1935)- directed by Leonard Buczkowski, Jakub Orlowski and Aleksander Pekalski
- Wacuś (1935)- directed by Michał Waszyński

== 1936 ==
- 30 karatów szczęścia (1936) – directed by Michał Waszyński
- Ada! To nie wypada! (1936) – directed by Konrad Tom
- Amerykańska awantura (1936) – directed by Ryszard Ordynski
- Bohaterowie Sybiru (1936) – directed by Michał Waszyński
- Bolek i Lolek (1936) – directed by Michał Waszyński
- Dodek na froncie (1936) – directed by Michał Waszyński
- Droga młodych (1936) (in Yiddish) – directed by Aleksander Ford
- Dwa dni w raju (1936) – directed by Leon Trystan
- Fredek uszczesliwia swiat (1936) – directed by Zbigniew Ziembinski
- Jadzia (1936) – directed by Mieczysław Krawicz
- Miłość wszystko zwycięża (1936)
- Pan Twardowski (1936) – directed by Henryk Szaro
- Papa sie żeni (1936) – directed by Michał Waszyński
- Róża (1936) – directed by Joseph Lejtes
- Straszny dwór (1936) – directed by Leonard Buczkowski
- Tajemnica panny Brinx (1936) – directed by Bazyli Sikiewicz
- Trędowata (1936) – directed by Juliusz Gardan
- Wacek na froncie (1936) – directed by Leonard Buczkowski
- Wierna rzeka (1936) – directed by Leonard Buczkowski
- Barbara Radziwiłłówna (1936) – directed by Joseph Lejtes
- Będzie lepiej (1936) – directed by Michał Waszyński
- Yidl Mitn Fidl (1936) – directed by Joseph Green and Jan Nowina-Przybylski

== 1937 ==
- Dorożkarz nr. 13 (1937) – directed by Marian Czauski
- Dyplomatyczna żona (1937) – directed by Carl Boese and Mieczysław Krawicz
- Dziewczęta z Nowolipek (1937) – directed by Joseph Lejtes
- Halka (1937) – directed by Juliusz Gardan
- Królowa przedmiescia (1937) – directed by Eugeniusz Bodo
- Ksiazatko (1937) – directed by Stanislaw Szebego and Konrad Tom
- Niedorajda (1937) – directed by Mieczysław Krawicz
- O czym marza kobiety (1937) – directed by Alexander Marten
- Ordynat Michorowski (1937) – directed by Henryk Szaro
- Pan redaktor szaleje (1937) – directed by Jan Nowina-Przybylski
- Pani minister tanczy (1937) – directed by Juliusz Gardan
- Parada Warszawy (1937) – directed by Hanka Ordonówna and Konrad Tom
- Płomienne serca (1937) – directed by Romuald Gantkowski
- Skłamałam (1937) – directed by Mieczysław Krawicz
- Sztandar Wolnosci (1937)
- Tkies Khaf (1937) (in Yiddish) – directed by Henryk Szaro
- Trójka hultajska (1937) – directed by Henryk Szaro
- Ty co w ostrej swiecisz bramie (1937) – directed by Jan Nowina-Przybylski
- Ulica Edisony (1937) – directed by Wanda Jakubowska
- Weseli biedacy (1937) (in Yiddish) – directed by Leon Jeannot
- Znachor (1937) – directed by Michał Waszyński
- Dybuk (1937) (in Yiddish) – directed by Michał Waszyński
- The Jester (1937) (in Yiddish) – directed by Joseph Green and Jan Nowina-Przybylski

== 1938 ==
- Krwawa rosa (1938)
- Moi rodzice rozwodza sie (1938) – directed by Mieczysław Krawicz
- Ostatnia brygada (1938) – directed by Michał Waszyński
- Pawel i Gawel (1938) – directed by Mieczysław Krawicz
- Profesor Wilczur (1938) – directed by Michał Waszyński
- Robert and Bertram (1938) – directed by Mieczysław Krawicz
- Serce matki (1938) – directed by Michał Waszyński
- Strachy (1938) – directed by Eugeniusz Cekalski and Karol Szolowski
- Sygnały (film) (1938) – directed by Joseph Lejtes
- Szczęśliwa 13-ka (1938) – directed by Marian Czauski
- Ułan księcia Józefa (1938) – directed by Konrad Tom
- Wrzos (1938) – directed by Juliusz Gardan
- Piętro wyżej (1938) – directed by Leon Trystan
- Zapomniana melodia (1938) – directed by Jan Fethke and Konrad Tom

Title	Director	Cast	Genre	Notes
1935
Jeszcze Polska nie zginęła	Franciszek Ożga, Zbigniew Jaszcz			
Złota Maska	Jan Fethke			
Sportowiec mimo woli	Mieczysław Krawicz			
1936
1937
Testament profesora Wilczura	Leonard Buczkowski			
Dziennik polskiego lotnika	Eugeniusz Cękalski			
Niedokończona podróż	Eugeniusz Cękalski			
Land Of My Mother	Romuald Gantkowski			narrated in English by Ewa Curie (with use of color pictures from reportage Beautiful Poland 1938–1939
1938
A Brivele der mamen	Joseph Green and Leon Trystan	Lucy Gehrman	Drama	A letter to mother; in Yiddish
Druga młodość	Michał Waszyński	Maria Gorczyńska	Drama, Romance	
Dziewczyna szuka miłosci	Romuald Gantkowski	Mieczysław Cybulski	Drama, Romance	
Florian	Leonard Buczkowski	Kazimierz Junosza-Stępowski	Romance, War	
Dziewczyna szuka miłosci	Romuald Gantkowski	Mieczysław Cybulski	Drama, Romance	
Za winy niepopełnione	Eugeniusz Bodo	Jerzy Pichelski	Drama, Romance	
Gehenna	Michał Waszyński	Lidia Wysocka	Drama, Romance	
Granica	Joseph Lejtes	Elżbieta Barszczewska	Drama, Romance	
Kobiety nad przepaścią	Michał Waszyński| and Emil Chaberski	Maria Bogda	Drama	
Kościuszko pod Racławicami	Joseph Lejtes	Tadeusz Bialoszczynski	Drama, History	
Ludzie Wisly	Aleksander Ford and Jerzy Zarzycki	Ina Benita	Comedy, Drama, Musical	
Mamele	Joseph Green and Konrad Tom	Molly Picon	Comedy, Musical	
Kobiety nad przepaścią	Michał Waszyński| and Emil Chaberski	Maria Bogda	Drama	
1939
Białystok	Saul Goskind and Yitzhak Goskind	Asher Lerner	documentary	Jewish Life in Bialystok Available online with English narration here
Kraków	Saul Goskind and Yitzhak Goskind	Asher Lerner	documentary	Jewish Life in Krakow Available online with English narration here
Łódź	Saul Goskind and Yitzhak Goskind	Asher Lerner	documentary	Jewish Life in Lodz Lost film
Lwów	Saul Goskind and Yitzhak Goskind	Asher Lerner	documentary	Jewish Life in Lwow Available online with English narration here
Warszawa	Saul Goskind and Yitzhak Goskind	Asher Lerner	documentary	A Day in Warsaw Available online with English narration here
Wilno	Saul Goskind and Yitzhak Goskind	Asher Lerner	documentary	Jewish Life in Vilna Available online with English subtitles here and with English narration here
On a heym	Aleksander Marten	Aleksander Marten	Drama	aka Bezdomni, Without a Home; last Yiddish language feature before the German invasion
Biały Murzyn	Leonard Buczkowski	Tamara Wiszniewska	Drama, Romance	
Bogurodzica	Jan Fethke, Henryk Korewicki	Maria Bogda	Drama	
Doktór Murek	Juliusz Gardan	Franciszek Brodniewicz	Drama	
Czarne diamenty	Jerzy Gabryelski	Ina Benita	Drama	
Geniusz sceny	Romuald Gantkowski	Ludwik Solski	Biography	
Ja tu rządzę	Mieczysław Krawicz	Zbigniew Rakowiecki	Comedy, Romance	
Kłamstwo Krystyny	Henryk Szaro	Elżbieta Barszczewska	Drama	
Nad Niemnem	Wanda Jakubowska and Karol Szołowski	Elżbieta Barszczewska	Drama	lost film
O czym się nie mówi	Mieczysław Krawicz	Stanisława Angel-Engelówna	Romance	
Rena	Michał Waszyński	Stanisława Angel-Engelówna	Drama	
Trzy serca	Michał Waszyński	Jerzy Pichelski	Comedy, Romance	
U kresu drogi	Michał Waszyński	Kazimierz Junosza-Stępowski	Drama	
Włóczegi	Michał Waszyński	Kazimierz Wajda	Comedy, Romance	

== Polish films released during the war ==
Title	Director	Cast	Genre	Notes
1940
Złota Maska	Jan Fethke			
Sportowiec mimo woli	Mieczysław Krawicz			
Żołnierz królowej Madagaskaru (film)	Jerzy Zarzycki			
1941
This Is Poland	Eugeniusz Cękalski			in English
Żona i nie żona	Eugeniusz Cękalski			
1942
Testament profesora Wilczura	Leonard Buczkowski			
Dziennik polskiego lotnika	Eugeniusz Cękalski			
Niedokończona podróż	Eugeniusz Cękalski			
White Eagle	Eugeniusz Cękalski			in English
Land of my Mother	Romuald Gantkowski			narrated in English by Ewa Curie (with use of color pictures from reportage Beautiful Poland 1938–1939
1943
Polska parada	Michał Waszyński			
Calling Mr Smith	Franciszka, Stefan Themerson			experimental color film, in English
1944
Monte Cassino	Michał Waszyński			
Niezwyciężeni – Idziemy	Franciszek Ożga			
Warszawa Walczy! – Przegląd nr 1-3	Jerzy Zarzycki			
1945
Budujemy Warszawę	Stanislaw Urbanowicz			
Łódź 1939-1945	Leonard Buczkowski			
Majdanek – cmentarzysko Europy	Aleksander Ford			
Mary Visits Poland	Eugeniusz Cekalski			
