= List of Polish films of the 1940s =

List of films produced in the Cinema of Poland in the 1940s.

Title	Director	Cast	Genre	Notes
1940
Jeszcze Polska nie zginęła	Franciszek Ożga, Zbigniew Jaszcz			shot in 1939
Złota Maska	Jan Fethke			shot in 1939
Sportowiec mimo woli	Mieczysław Krawicz			shot in 1939
1941
This Is Poland	Eugeniusz Cękalski			in English
Żona i nie żona				shot in 1939
1942
Testament profesora Wilczura	Leonard Buczkowski			shot in 1939
Dziennik polskiego lotnika	Eugeniusz Cękalski			
Niedokończona podróż	Eugeniusz Cękalski			
White Eagle	Eugeniusz Cękalski			in English
Land Of My Mother	Romuald Gantkowski			narrated in English by Ewa Curie (with use of color pictures from reportage Beautiful Poland 1938–1939
1943
Polska parada	Michał Waszyński			
Calling Mr Smith	Franciszka, Stefan Themerson			experimental color film, in English
1944
Monte Cassino	Michał Waszyński			
Niezwyciężeni – Idziemy	Franciszek Ożga			
Warszawa Walczy! - Przeglad nr 1-3	Jerzy Zarzycki			
1945
Budujemy Warszawe	Stanislaw Urbanowicz			
Lódz 1939-1945	Leonard Buczkowski			
Majdanek - cmentarzysko Europy	Aleksander Ford			
Mary Visits Poland	Eugeniusz Cekalski			
1946
Wielka droga	Michał Waszyński		war drama	produced by Polish II Corps, Polish Armed Forces in the West
1947
The Last Stage	Wanda Jakubowska	Tatjana Gorecka, Antonina Gorecka	Drama	produced by Film Polski
1948
1949
