= The Twelve Chairs (1933 film) =

1933 comedy film

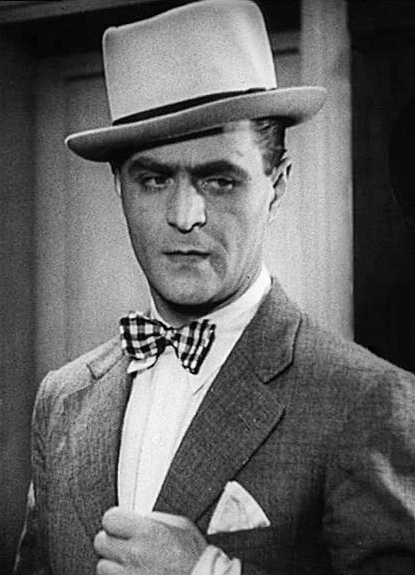
- Adolf Dymsza in the film
- Directed by: Martin Frič; Michał Waszyński
- Written by: Ilf and Petrov (novel); Karel Lamač (screenplay)
- Release date: 6 October 1933
- Running time: 66 minutes
- Countries: Czechoslovakia; Poland
- Languages: Czech; Polish

The Twelve Chairs (Czech: Dvanáct křesel; Polish: Dwanaście krzeseł) is a 1933 Czechoslovak-Polish comedy film directed by Martin Frič and Michał Waszyński, it is an adaptation of the eponymous 1928 novel by Soviet authors Ilya Ilf and Evgeny Petrov.

== Cast ==
- Vlasta Burian ... Ferdinand Šuplátko
- Adolf Dymsza ... antiquary Wladyslaw Kepka
- Zula Pogorzelska ... director of the orphanage
- Zofia Jaroszewska ... employee of the orphanage
- Wiktor Biegański ... professor - spiritist
- Stanisław Belski ... owner of the furniture shop
- Wanda Jarszewska
- Lo Kittay
- Józef Kondrat ... chauffeur
- Eugeniusz Koszutski ... clerk Repecki
- Aniela Miszczykówna ... dentist
- Hanna Parysiewicz
- Stefan Szczuka ... auctioneer
- Helena Zarembina
