= Feliks Żukowski =

Polish actor and theatre director

- Born: 30 May 1904; Riga, Latvia
- Died: 17 January 1976 (aged 71); Łódź, Poland

Feliks Żukowski (30 May 1904 – 17 January 1976) was a Polish actor and theatre director. He worked in theatres in Warsaw, Vilnius, Lublin, Częstochowa and Łódź. Feliks was a manager of Stefan Jaracz Teatr in Olsztyn. He was also a soldier of Armia Krajowa, prisoner of Sachsenhausen concentration camp.

== Notable roles ==
Films

- Młody las (1934)
- Robert and Bertram (1938)
- Złota Maska (1939)
- Zakazane piosenki (1946)
- Jasne łany (1947)
- Celuloza (1953)
- Przygoda na Mariensztacie (1953)
- Piątka z ulicy Barskiej (1954)
- Niedaleko Warszawy (1954)
- Skarb kapitana Martensa (1957)
- Krzyżacy (1960)
- Hubal (1973)
- Gniazdo (1974)

Theatre

- Igraszki z diabłem (1948 and 1962)
- Don Carlos (1956)
- Żywy trup (1961)

TV series

- Stawka większa niż życie (1967–1968)
- Chłopi (1972)

== Notable director's works ==
- Kariera Artura Ui (1962)
- Jegor Bułyczow i inni (1970)
