= Barbara Gilewska =

Polish actress (1911–1986)

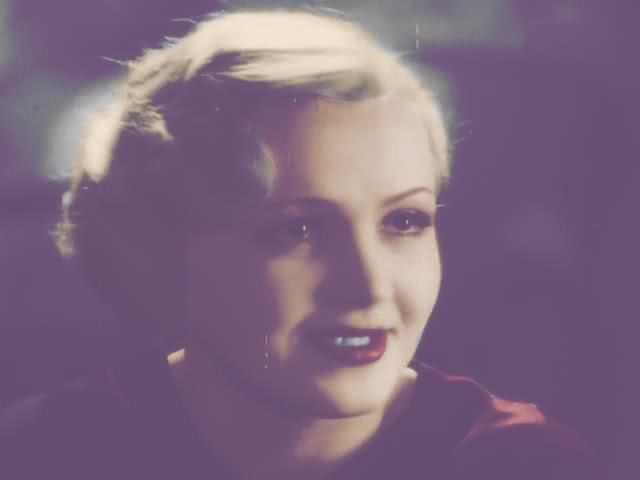
- Barbara Gilewska in 1934
- Born: 16 October 1911
- Died: 23 September 1986 (aged 74); Warsaw, Poland
- Occupation: Actress
- Years active: 1930–1935

Barbara Gilewska (16 October 1911 – 23 September 1986) was a Polish film actress and dancer.

== Biography ==
She was born 16 October 1911 and died in Warsaw 23 September 1986.

First known as a dancer, she performed in a number of Warsaw revues, including Nowym Ananasie (1931–32), Qui Pro Quo (1932), Morskie Oko (1932), Feminie (1932), Rexie (1933), and Nowej Rewii (1934). She also worked in touring companies, traveling to Kielce, Nowy Sącz and Tarnów. She also performed for the Dramatic Theater (Teatrze Dramatycznym) of the Second Polish Army in Łódź.

In film, she had a number of bit parts, working with major Polish actors including Eugeniusz Bodo, Witold Conti, and Jadwiga Smosarska.

== Filmography ==
- 1930: Janko Muzykant, uncredited
- 1933: Life Sentence as Jadzia's friend, uncredited
- 1933: Prokurator Alicja Horn as woman in the courtroom at the trial of Jan Winkler
- 1933: Jego ekscelencja subiekt as participant of the New Year's Eve ball, uncredited
- 1934: Pieśniarz Warszawy as newsagent Zosia
- 1935: Nie miała baba kłopotu or Granny Had No Worries as Basia Boczkówna
- 1935: Kochaj tylko mnie as Basia, Lidia Relska's maid
