= Władysław Grabowski =

Polish actor (1883–1961)

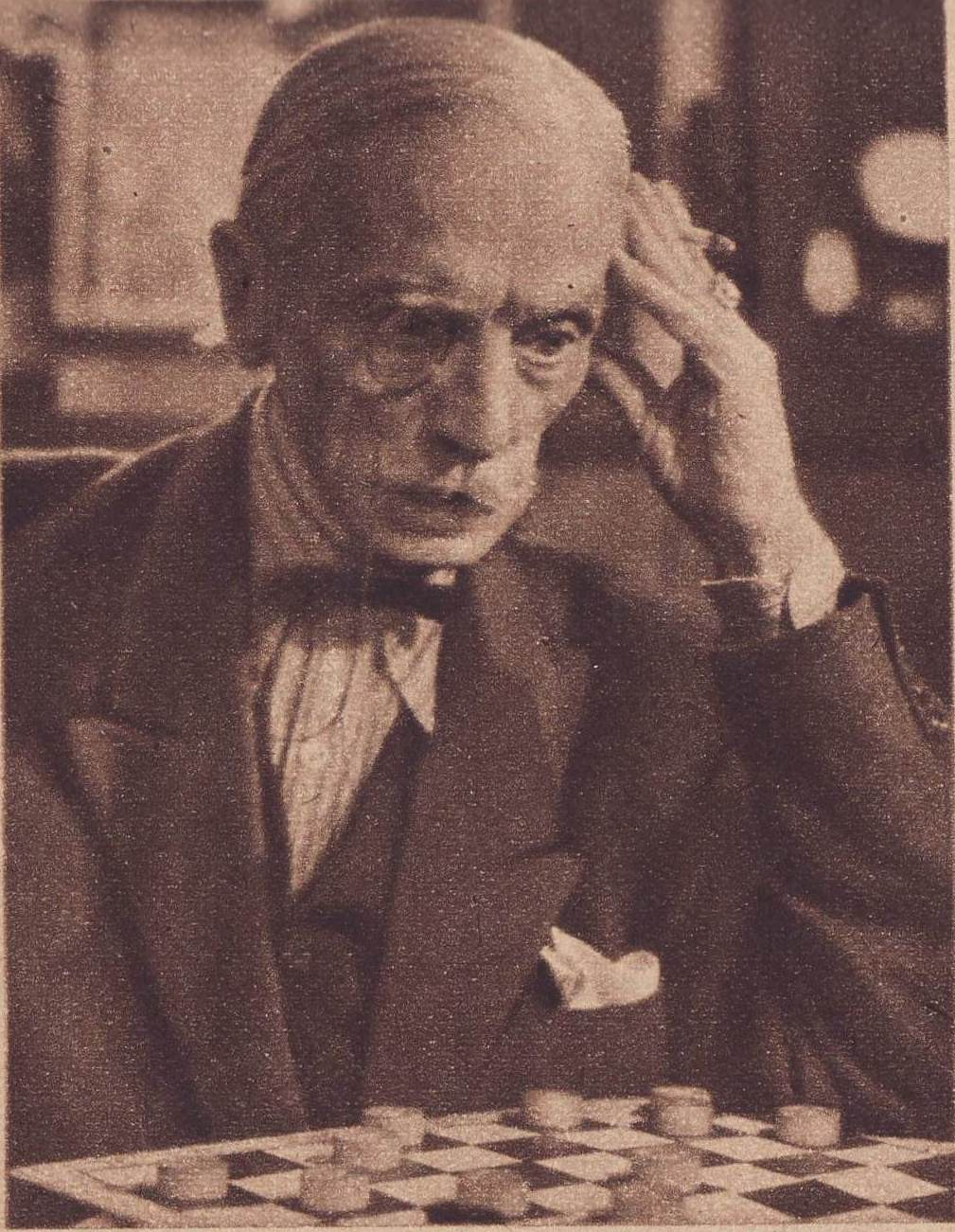
- Actors from the Polish movie Dwie godziny (Two hours): Władysław Grabowski
- Born: 1 June 1883; Warsaw, Congress Poland
- Died: 6 July 1961 (aged 78); Warsaw, Poland
- Occupation: Actor
- Years active: 1911–1957

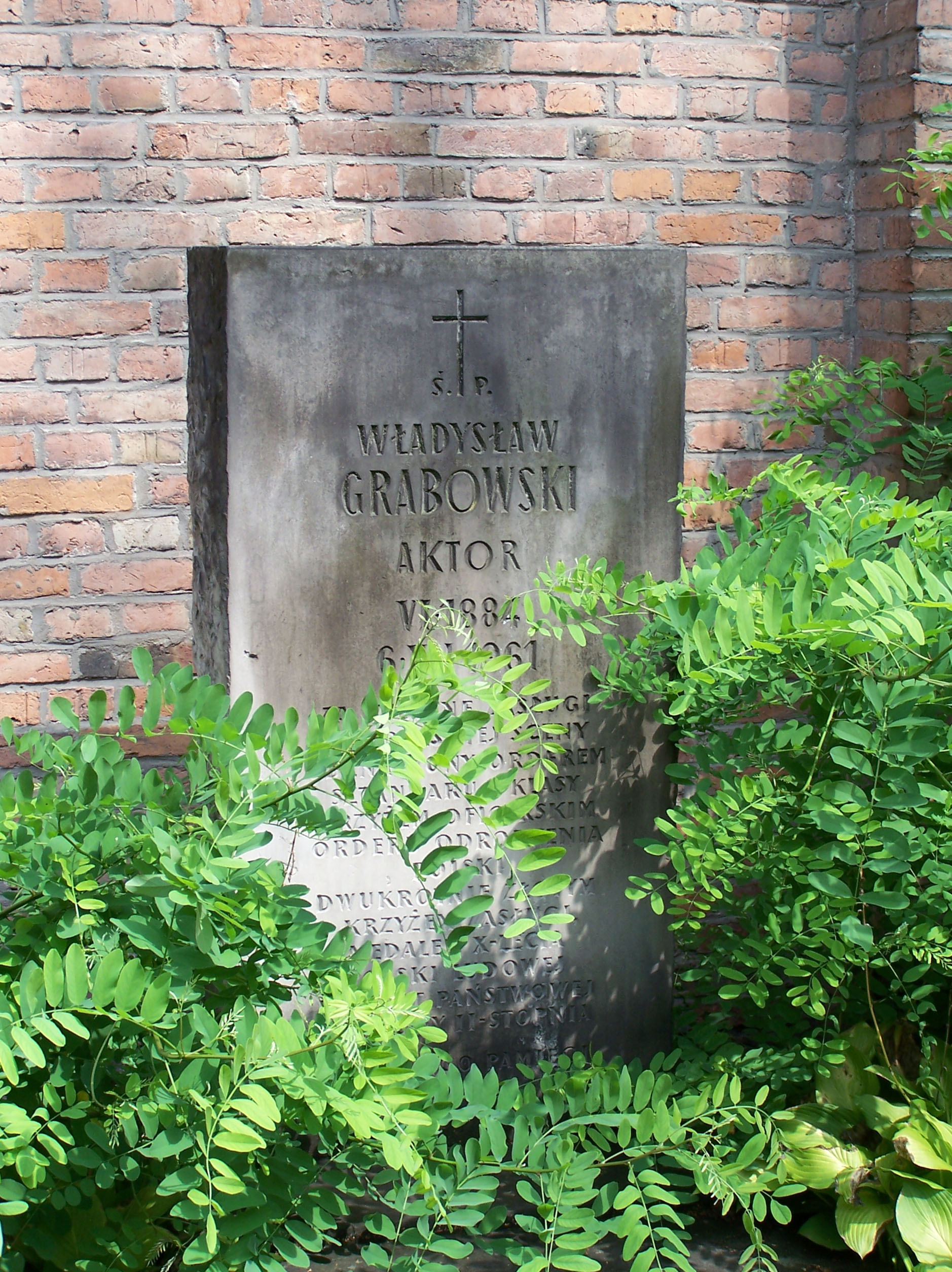
Grave of Grabowski at the Powązki Cemetery in Warsaw

Władysław Grabowski (1 June 1883 – 6 July 1961) was a Polish film actor. He appeared in more than 35 films between 1911 and 1957, mainly in supporting comedy roles.

== Biography ==
Władysław Grabowski was born on 1 June 1883 in Warsaw, the son of Władysław and Joanna née Szałowicz. He was a graduate of the Drama Class of the Warsaw Music Society. He made his debut in the theater in 1905. Grabowski performed on the stages of theaters in Łódź, Warsaw, Kraków and St. Petersburg. He made his cinema debut in 1911 as the rabbi's assistant in the film Meir Ezofowicz. He acted in many films of the interwar period. He was primarily a comedy actor. He died on 6 July 1961 in Warsaw and was buried in the Alley of Merit at the Powązki Cemetery in Warsaw (grave 72).

== Selected filmography ==
- Pan Twardowski (1921)
- The Unspeakable (1924)
- The Unthinkable (1926)
- Is Lucyna a Girl? (1934)
- Wacuś (1935)
- Kochaj tylko mnie (1935)
- Two Joasias (1935)
- Bolek i Lolek (1936)
- 30 karatów szczęścia (1936)
- Dodek na froncie (1936)
- The Leper (1936)
- Daddy Gets Married (1936)
- Three Troublemakers (1937)
- The Girls from Nowolipki (1937)
- Count Michorowski (1937)
- Heather (1938)
