= Romuald Gierasieński =

Polish actor

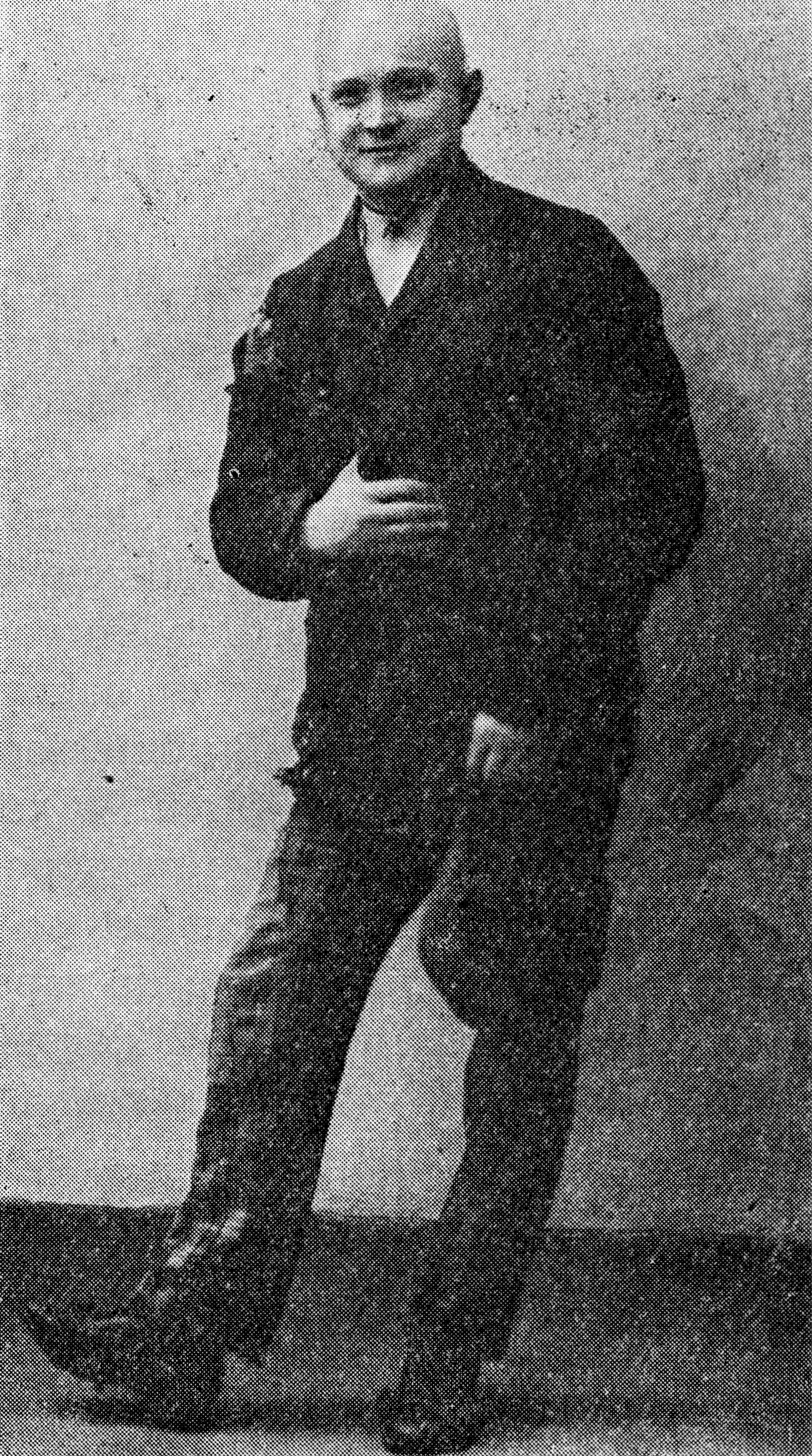
- Born: 6 February 1885; Lublin, Poland, Russian Empire (now Lublin, Poland)
- Died: 21 June 1956 (aged 71); Kazimierz Dolny, Poland
- Occupation: Actor
- Years active: 1902-1956

Romuald Gierasieński (6 February 1885 – 21 June 1956) was a Polish actor. He appeared in eleven films between 1920 and 1939.

== Selected filmography ==
- Co mój mąż robi w nocy (1934)
- Córka generała Pankratowa (1934)
- Panienka z poste restante (1935)
- Znachor (1937)
- Doctor Murek (1939)
