= Alma Kar =

Polish actress (1908–1992)

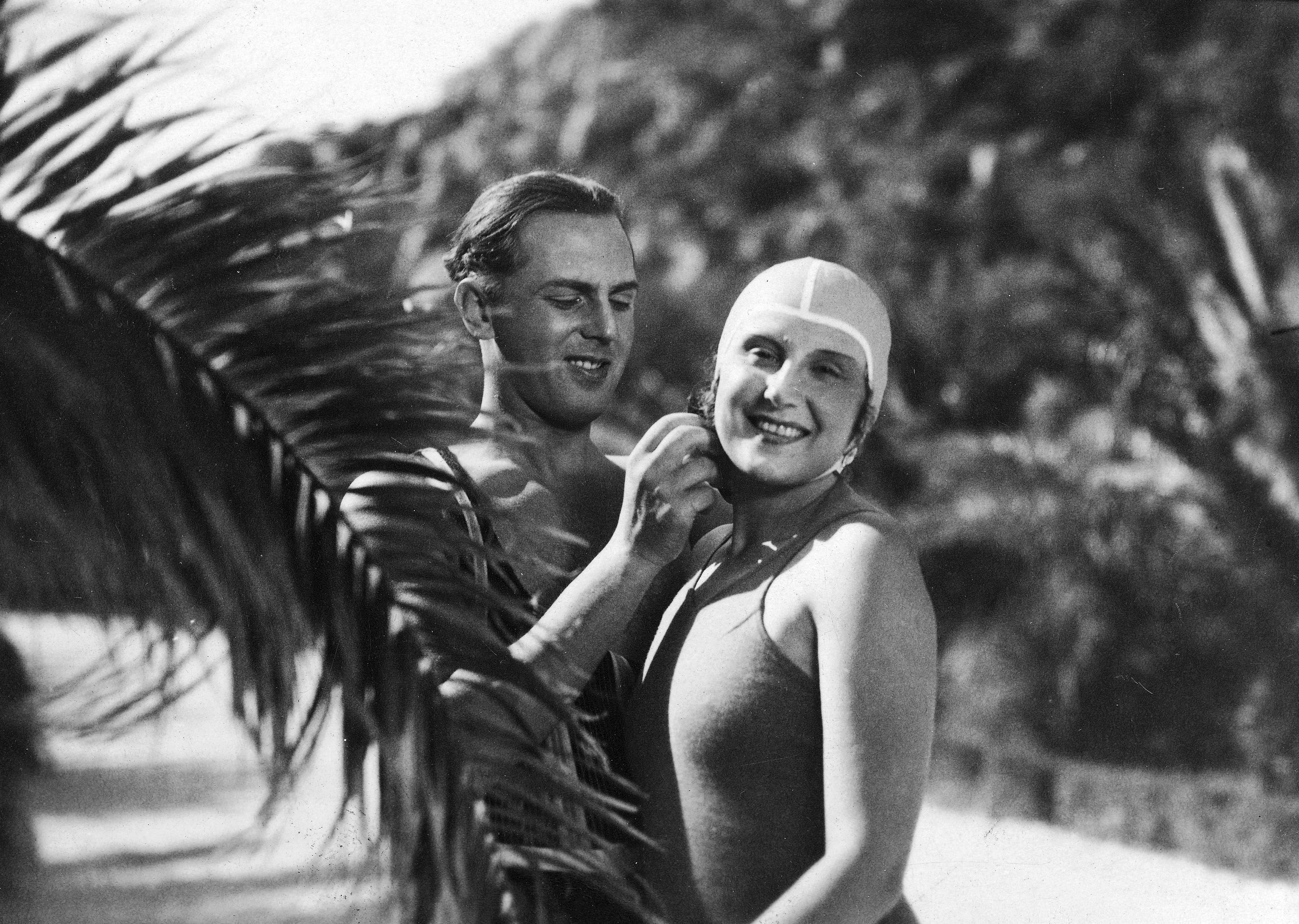
- Alma Kar as Marysia Kochańska and Aleksander Żabczyński as president Adam Olszewicz in bathing suits in one of the scenes of the film Panienka z poste-restante 1934
- Born: 14 November 1908; Russia
- Died: 13 July 1992 (aged 83); Stanisławów Pierwszy, Masovian Voivodeship, Poland
- Occupation: Actress
- Years active: 1929-1936

Alma Kar (14 November 1908 – 13 July 1992) was a Polish film actress.

== Selected filmography ==
- The Woman Who Desires Sin (1929)
- Zabawka (1933)
- Ten Percent for Me (1933)
- Panienka z poste restante (1935)
