= The Polish Marathon =

1927 film

- Directed by: Wiktor Biegański
- Written by: Kazimierz Andrzej Czyzowski
- Starring: Mieczysław Cybulski; Wanda Smosarska; Jerzy Kobusz
- Cinematography: Antoni Wawrzyniak; Albert Wywerka
- Production company: Klio-Film
- Release date: 1927
- Country: Poland
- Languages: Silent; Polish intertitles

The Polish Marathon (Polish:Maraton polski) is a 1927 Polish silent drama film directed by Wiktor Biegański and starring Mieczysław Cybulski, Wanda Smosarska and Jerzy Kobusz.

== Cast ==
- Mieczysław Cybulski as Janek
- Wanda Smosarska as Narzeczona Janka
- Jerzy Kobusz as Filipek

== Bibliography ==
- Skaff, Sheila. The Law of the Looking Glass: Cinema in Poland, 1896–1939. Ohio University Press, 2008.
