= Helena Zarembina =

Polish actress (1895–1960)

- Born: 6 May 1895; Mogilev, Russian Empire
- Died: 9 January 1960 (aged 64); Częstochowa, Poland
- Occupation: actress

Helena Zarembina (née Soenberg, 6 May 1895 – 9 January 1960) was a Polish stage and film actress.

Helena Soenberg was born in Mogilev to Marcin and Florentyna Soenbergs. In 1922 she graduated from a Drama school in Warsaw and since then played at various theatres. She also played in films. He last role was in the 1956 film Three Women. Her last theatre role was in the 1955 staging of the play The Government Inspector (cook Fedosya [Федосья]).

She was buried at the Saint Roch Cemetery, Częstochowa

== Selected filmography ==
- Zabawka (1933)
- Kocha, lubi, szanuje (1934)
- Wacuś (1935)
- Antek policmajster (1935)
- Nie miała baba kłopotu (1935)
- ABC miłości (1935)
- Znachor (1937)
- Three Troublemakers (1937)
- Profesor Wilczur (1938)
- Włóczęgi (1939)
- Doktór Murek (1939)
- Złota Maska (1939)
- Three Women, an old woman in the Warsaw Fotoplastikon
