= Stanisław Sielański =

Polish actor

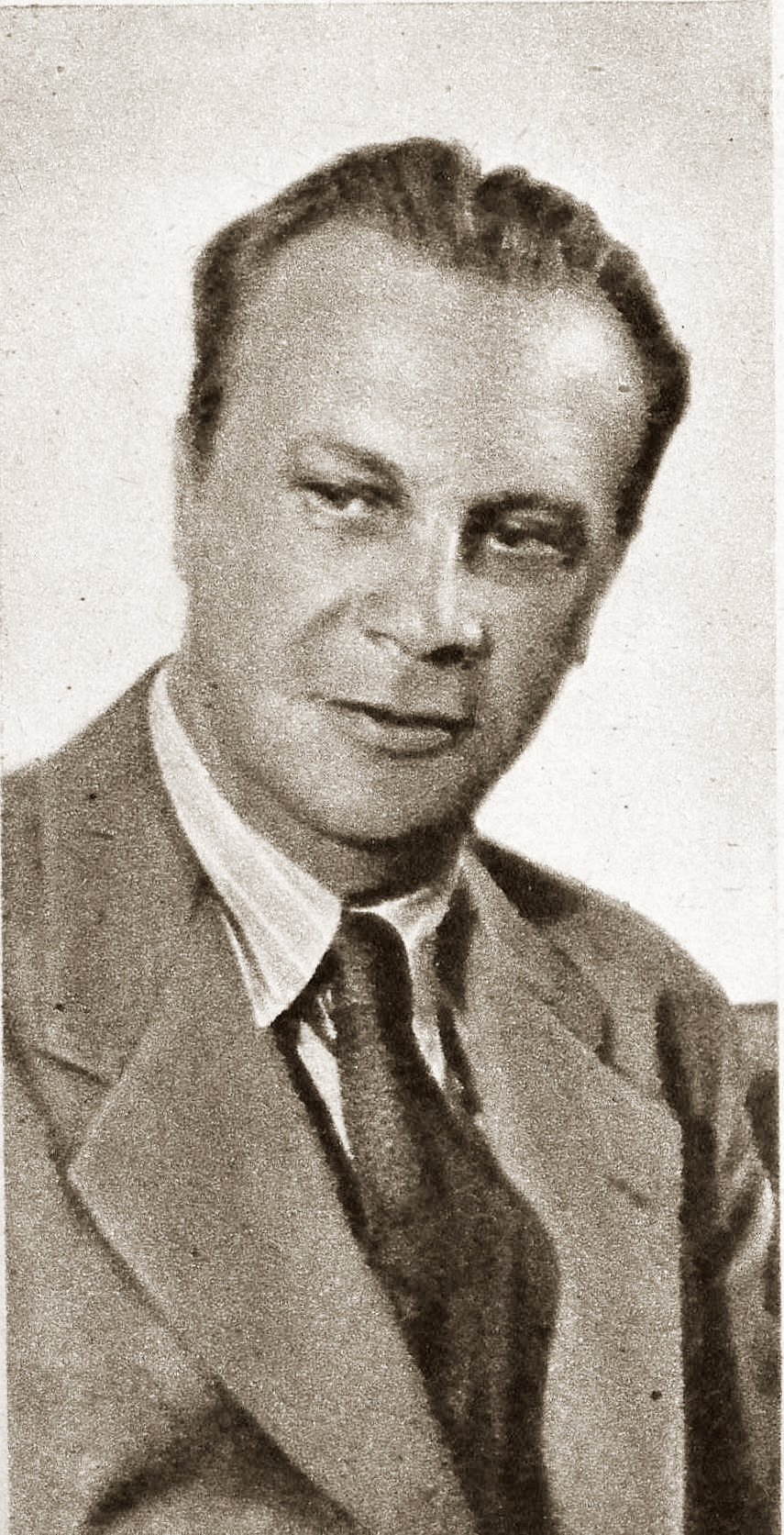
- Born: Stanisław Nasielski; 8 August 1899; Łódź, Congress Poland
- Died: 28 April 1955 (aged 55); New York City, New York, United States
- Occupation: Actor
- Years active: 1929-1943

Stanisław Sielański (8 August 1899 – 28 April 1955) was a Polish film and cabaret actor. He appeared in more than 50 films between 1929 and 1943.

== Selected filmography ==
- Uwiedziona (1931)
- Bezimienni bohaterowie (1932)
- Zabawka (1933)
- Parade of the Reservists (1934)
- Uhlan's Pledge (1934)
- Love, Cherish, Respect (1934)
- Rapsodia Bałtyku (1935)
- Granny Had No Worries (1935)
- Kochaj tylko mnie (1935)
- Będzie lepiej (1936)
- The Haunted Manor (1936)
- Pan Twardowski (1936)
- Daddy Gets Married (1936)
- American Adventure (1936)
- Wierna rzeka (1936)
- Ułan Księcia Józefa (1937)
- Miss Minister Is Dancing (1937)
- Three Troublemakers (1937)
- Kobiety nad przepaścią (1938)
- Rena (1938)
- Ostatnia brygada (1938)
- Serce matki (1938)
- Doctor Murek (1939)
- The Vagabonds (1939)
- To Happiness Through Tears (1941)
