= Michał Znicz =

Polish actor

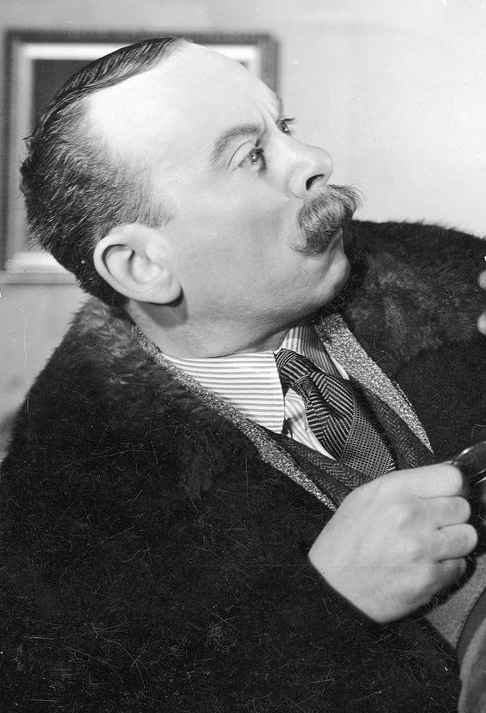
- Michał Znicz
- Born: Michał Feiertag; 1884; Warsaw
- Died: 24 December 1943 (aged 55); Pruszków
- Occupation: Actor
- Years active: 1934–1940

Michał Znicz (born Michał Feiertag) (1888–1943) was a Polish stage and film actor.

== Selected filmography ==
- Młody las (1934)
- Pieśniarz Warszawy (1934)
- Co mój mąż robi w nocy? (1934)
- Love, Cherish, Respect (1934)
- Panienka z poste restante (1935)
- Two Joasias (1935)
- Granny Had No Worries (1935)
- Kochaj tylko mnie (1935)
- Pan Twardowski (1936)
- Bolek i Lolek (1936)
- American Adventure (1936)
- Dodek na froncie (1936)
- Róża (1936)
- Niedorajda (1937)
- Miss Minister Is Dancing (1937)
- A Diplomatic Wife (1937)
- Second Youth (1938)
- Robert and Bertram (1938)
- Krystyna's Lie (1939)

== Bibliography ==
- Skaff, Sheila. The Law of the Looking Glass: Cinema in Poland, 1896-1939. Ohio University Press, 2008.
