= Loda Niemirzanka =

Polish actress (1906–1984)

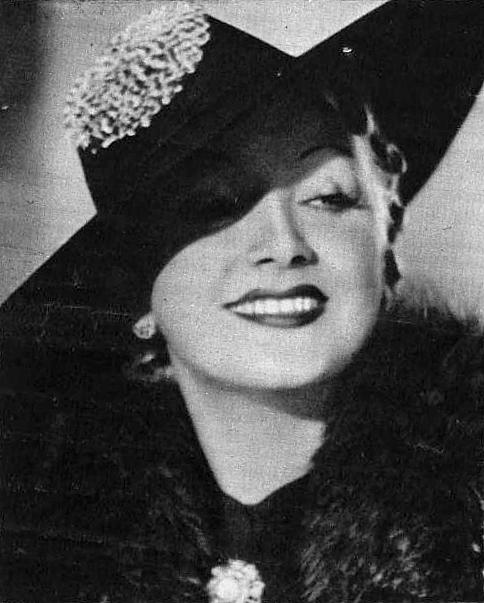
- Born: Leokadia Niemira; 23 November 1906; Warsaw, Congress Poland
- Died: 14 August 1984 (aged 74); London, England
- Occupations: Actress, dancer
- Years active: 1924–1956
- Relatives: Jan Kauzik (father-in-law), Karol Niemira (uncle), Maria Niemira (niece), Bogdan Niemira (nephew)

Loda Niemirzanka, (Note: 'Niemirzanka' is a historical form of the female surname, after woman's father name or surname) real name Leokadia Franciszka Niemira (23 November 1906 in Pruszków, Poland – 14 August 1984 in London, UK), Kopczyńska, from her first marriage, Kauzik, from her second marriage; was a Polish ballet dancer, film and theatre actress. and a soldier of the Home Army (Polish: Armia Krajowa, pronounced [ˈarmja kraˈjɔva]; abbreviated AK), a dominant resistance movement in German-occupied Poland during World War II. She appeared in fourteen films between 1931 and 1939.

== Biography ==
She was the daughter of Franciszek Fabian Niemira and Ludwika née Szmidt. Her parents married in 1902 in Warsaw. She was baptized on 25 December 1906 in the parish church in Żbików (currently a district of Pruszków). Her grandfather, Ludwik Schmidt, an evangelical, came from Płock. She attended ballet school and high school in Warsaw. As early as 1924, she performed as a ballet dancer at the Grand Theatre in Vilnius. She then played in Łódź, at the Municipal Theatre and the Popular Theatre. In the 1930s, she began performing in Warsaw cabarets and revue theatres, and at the same time began her film career. She worked with well known actors and directors, including internationally recognized director Michał Waszyński. She became famous playing a main character, Ada, in a 1936 musical comedy Ada, Don't Do That!.

After World War II, she emigrated to England. Her ashes were brought to Poland and placed in the military Powązki Cemetery in her son's tomb.

== Personal life ==
Her first husband was Stefan Kopczyński, with whom she had a son, Stefan Roman Jerzy Kopczyński born in 1926. He died as a young soldier of the Grey Ranks, operating under the pseudonym Schmidt or Szmidt during the Warsaw Uprising in 1944. Her second husband, whom she married in 1937, Stanisław Kauzik alias Dołęga-Modrzewski, was a politician, a lawyer and a soldier of the Home Army (Polish: Armia Krajowa, pronounced [ˈarmja kraˈjɔva]; abbreviated AK), a dominant resistance movement in German-occupied Poland during World War II.

== Selected filmography ==
- Dziesięciu z Pawiaka (1931)
- Księżna Łowicka (1932)
- Szpieg w masce (1933)
- Life Sentence (1933)
- Two Joasias (1935) jako kandydatka do posady maszynistki
- Jaśnie pan szofer (1935) jako pokojówka
- Będzie lepiej (1936) jako Wanda Ruczyńska
- Pan Twardowski (1936)
- Ada! To nie wypada! (1936) jako Ada Dziewanowska
- Książątko (1937) jako Rita Malvani
- Rena (1938)
- Moi rodzice rozwodzą się (1938)
- Ja tu rządzę (1939/1941)
