= Parade of the Reservists =

Parada rezerwistów
- Directed by: Michał Waszyński
- Written by: Emanuel Schlechter, Szer-Szen
- Release date: 30 April 1934
- Country: Poland
- Language: Polish

Parade of the Reservists (Parada rezerwistów) is a 1934 Polish film directed by Michał Waszyński.

== Cast ==
- Adolf Dymsza ... The Chief
- Jerzy Kobusz
- Józef Kondrat ... The Private
- Tola Mankiewiczówna ... Barbara
- Stanisław Sielański ... The Waiter
- Władysław Walter ... The Corporal
