= Irena Eichlerówna =

Polish actress (1908–1990)

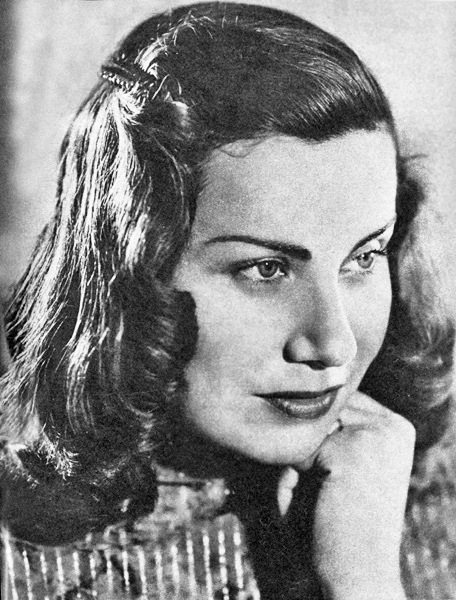
- Born: 19 April 1908; Warsaw, Russian Empire
- Died: 12 September 1990 (aged 82); Warsaw, Poland
- Occupation: Actress
- Years active: 1933-1984

Irena Eichlerówna (19 April 1908 – 12 September 1990) was a Polish actress. She was considered to be "Poland's Eleonora Duse".

== Filmography ==
=== Film ===
- 1933 - Life Sentence
- 1936 - Róża
- 1938 - Krwawa rosa
- 1948 - Ślepy tor
- 1966 - Szyfry

=== Theatre ===
- 1964 - Kochany kłamca played Beatrice Stella Campbell
- 1967 - Król Edyp played Jokasta
- 1967 - Wdowa po pułkowniku
- 1968 - Korespondencja Chopina
- 1972 - Dwa teatry played Matka
- 1977 - Mindowe played Rogneda
- 1978 - Filomena Marturano played Filomena
- 1984 - Wspomnienie played Sara Bernhardt
