= Daddy Gets Married =

1936 Polish film

Papa się żeni
- Directed by: Michał Waszyński
- Written by: Jan Fethke (writer), Wincenty Rapacki (play)
- Screenplay by: Karol Jarossy
- Release date: October 12, 1936
- Running time: 78 minutes
- Country: Poland
- Language: Polish

Daddy Gets Married (original Polish title: Papa się żeni) is a 1936 Polish comedy film written by Karol Jarossy and adapted from a play by Wincenty Rapacki by Jan Fethke and directed by Michał Waszyński.

The film is also referred to in English as Papa is Getting Married.

== Cast ==
- Lidia Wysocka ... Lili
- Jerzy Sulima-Jaszczolt
- Mira Zimińska ... Mira Stella
- Jadwiga Andrzejewska ... Jadzia
- Klara Belska
- Stefania Betcherowa
- Franciszek Brodniewicz... Visconti
- Zofia Downarówna
- Antoni Fertner ... Baron
- Stefania Górska ... Dancer
- Władysław Grabowski... Ralfini
- Stanisław Grolicki ... City Editor
- Fryderyk Jarossy... Director of the 'Olimpii'
- Eugeniusz Koszutski
- Edmund Minowicz
- Zbigniew Rakowiecki... Jerzy Murski
- Wincenty Rapacki
- Stanisław Sielański ... Visconti's servant

== Release ==
The film was released in Poland on 11 December 1936.

== Reception ==
The film is a "comedy of errors set in the world of artistic elites", described as follows by a contemporary review in the Kurier Warszawski: "The farce is bursting with humor. Of course, this is carefree and unpretentious humor." The film is considered a good example of the use of cabaret in Polish film in the 1930s.

"It is not really suitable for the screen; it does not have enough "dramatic" tensions, nor enough film situations. The authors of the adaptation were not able to adapt it properly, nor did they find good performers.", wrote Maria Leonia Jabłonkówna, in Wiadomości Literackie in 1937. In a review in the Kurier Polski, the actors are mentioned as follows: "But the leading role in the cast is not the one played by Fertner as the titular papa, nor the one by Brodniewicz as the tenor, the idol of women, nor that of Lidja Wysocka, who is harmed by certain unfortunate close-ups…Surprisingly, it's Jadzia Andrzejewska who comes forward, this Cinderella of Polish film, wronged by producers who give her mediocre roles, disregarded by directors who think that a character role requires grotesque ugliness…"

== Legacy ==
The film was restored and digitalised by the Polish Film Institute.

=== Screenings ===
The film was screened in 2018 in a retrospective of Maria Hirszbein's production, and in 2023 during the Polish Film Festival in America.
