= Life Sentence (film) =

1933 film

- Directed by: Juliusz Gardan
- Written by: Maria Morozowicz-Szczepkowska
- Produced by: Stanislaw Szebego
- Starring: Jadwiga Andrzejewska; Irena Eichlerówna; Dobieslaw Damiecki
- Cinematography: Zbigniew Gniazdowski
- Music by: Henry Vars
- Production company: Blok-Muzafilm
- Release date: 24 December 1933
- Running time: 70 minutes
- Country: Poland
- Language: Polish

Life Sentence (Polish: Wyrok zycia) is a 1933 Polish drama film directed by Juliusz Gardan and starring Jadwiga Andrzejewska, Irena Eichlerówna and Dobieslaw Damiecki. It was shot at the Falanga Studios in Warsaw. The film's sets were designed by the art director Jacek Rotmil. The film was very well received and was voted the best film of the season.

== Cast ==
- Jadwiga Andrzejewska as Hanna
- Irena Eichlerówna as Krystyna
- Dobieslaw Damiecki as Janusz
- Barbara Gilewska as Hanna's colleague
- Loda Niemirzanka as Hanna's colleague
- Janina Krzymuska as Country Girl
- Pawel Owerllo as Doctor
- Wanda Jarszewska as Urzedniczka
- Antoni Bednarczyk as Jury Foreman

== Bibliography ==
- Bren, Frank. World Cinema: Poland. Flicks Books, 1986.
- Ford, Charles & Hammond, Robert. Polish Film: A Twentieth Century History. McFarland, 2005.
- Haltof, Marek. Historical Dictionary of Polish Cinema. Rowman & Littlefield Publishers, 2015.
