= The Great Way =

- Directed by: Michał Waszyński
- Written by: Konrad Tom
- Release date: 29 October 1946
- Running time: 87 minutes
- Country: Poland
- Language: Polish

The Great Way (Polish: Wielka droga) is a 1946 Polish film directed by Michał Waszyński.

== Plot ==
The plot spans from shortly before the outbreak of World War II to its end. In the city of Lwów (PL) in 1939 Adam and Irena fall in Love, but are separated by the outbreak of the war. Both are deported by the Soviets to Siberia, where they briefly meet again when signing up to the newly created Polish army. Again separated from Irena, Adam marches with the army from Siberia through the Middle East and fights on the Italian front line. During the battle of Monte Cassino he gets wounded when participating in the first assault, temporarily losing his eyesight. In the military hospital, a nurse finds his diary and, initially with the intent to relieve his suffering, later forms romantic affection towards him and pretends to be his fiancée Irena. This, however, is ended when the real Irena arrives. Adam recovers from his wounds and, after the Polish victory at Monte Cassino, follows the army together with Irena to northern Italy, where they settle after the end of the war. In this film, the plot serves as a framework for original footage taken by the army during the war. The name of the film, Wielka Droga, means 'The Great Way', referring to the march from Poland through Siberia and the Middle East to Northern Italy. This is the only film showing the Polish participation in the Italian Campaign (World War II).

== Cast ==
- Albin Ossowski ... Adam
- Renata Bogdanska ... Irena
- Jadwiga Andrzejewska ... Jadwiga
- Wiesława Buczerowa
- Feliks Fabian
- Ludwik Lawiński
- Mieczysław Malicz
- Bolesław Orlicz
- Józef Winawer
- Stanisław Belski
- Jadwiga Domańska
