= Aleksander Żabczyński =

Polish actor

- Aleksander Żabczyński
- Born: 24 July 1900; Warsaw, Poland
- Died: 31 May 1958 (aged 57); Warsaw
- Occupation: Actor
- Years active: 1926-1939

Aleksander Bożydar Żabczyński (24 July 1900 in Warsaw – 31 May 1958 in Warsaw), was a Polish stage and movie actor, and one of the most popular actors during the interwar period in Poland.

== Filmography ==
- Czerwony błazen (1926)
- Ziemia obiecana (1927)
- The Wild Girl (1928)
- Janko Muzykant (1930)
- Głos serca (1931)
- Kobieta, która się śmieje (1931)
- The Story of Sin (1933)
- Córka generała Pankratowa (1934)
- Uhlan's Pledge (1934)
- Panienka z poste restante (1935)
- Manewry miłosne (Love Manoeuvres) (1935)
- Ada! To nie wypada! (Ada, Don't Do That!) (1936)
- Tajemnica Panny Brinx (Miss Brinx' Secret) (1936)
- Będzie lepiej (1936)
- Jadzia (1936)
- Miss Minister Is Dancing (1937)
- A Diplomatic Wife (1937)
- Kobiety nad przepaścią (1938)
- Królowa przedmieścia (Queen of the Suburbs) (1938)
- Zapomniana melodia (1938)
- Żona i nie żona (1939)
- Biały Murzyn (1939)
- Trzy serca (1939)
- Złota Maska (1939)
- A Sportsman Against His Will (1940)
