= Władysław Walter =

Polish actor

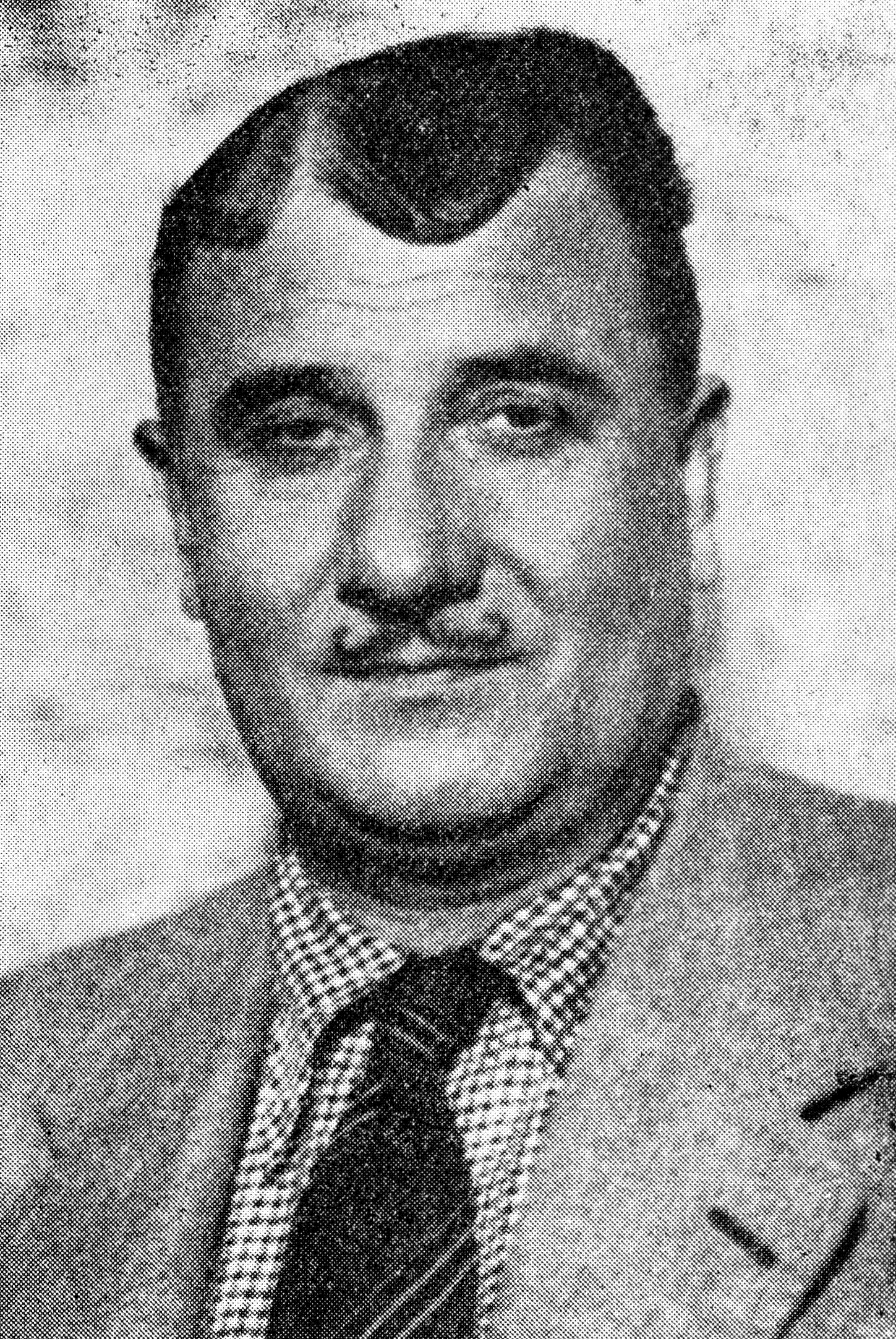
- Władysław Walter in 1977
- Born: 4 June 1887; Warsaw, Poland, Russian Empire
- Died: 4 November 1959 (aged 72); Łódź, Poland
- Occupation: Actor
- Years active: 1918–1954

Władysław Walter (4 June 1887 – 4 November 1959) was a Polish film actor. He appeared in more than 30 films between 1918 and 1954.

== Selected filmography ==
- The Unthinkable (1926)
- Pod banderą miłości (1929)
- A Strong Man (1929)
- Ułani, ułani, chłopcy malowani (1932)
- Ten Percent for Me (1933)
- Pieśniarz Warszawy (1934)
- Uhlan's Pledge (1934)
- Młody Las (1934)
- Przeor Kordecki – obrońca Częstochowy (1939)
- Kocha, lubi, szanuje (1934)
- Panienka z poste restante (1935)
- Nie miała baba kłopotu (1935)
- Złota Maska (1939)
- Border Street (1948)
