= Stanisława Angel-Engelówna =

Polish actress (1908–1958)

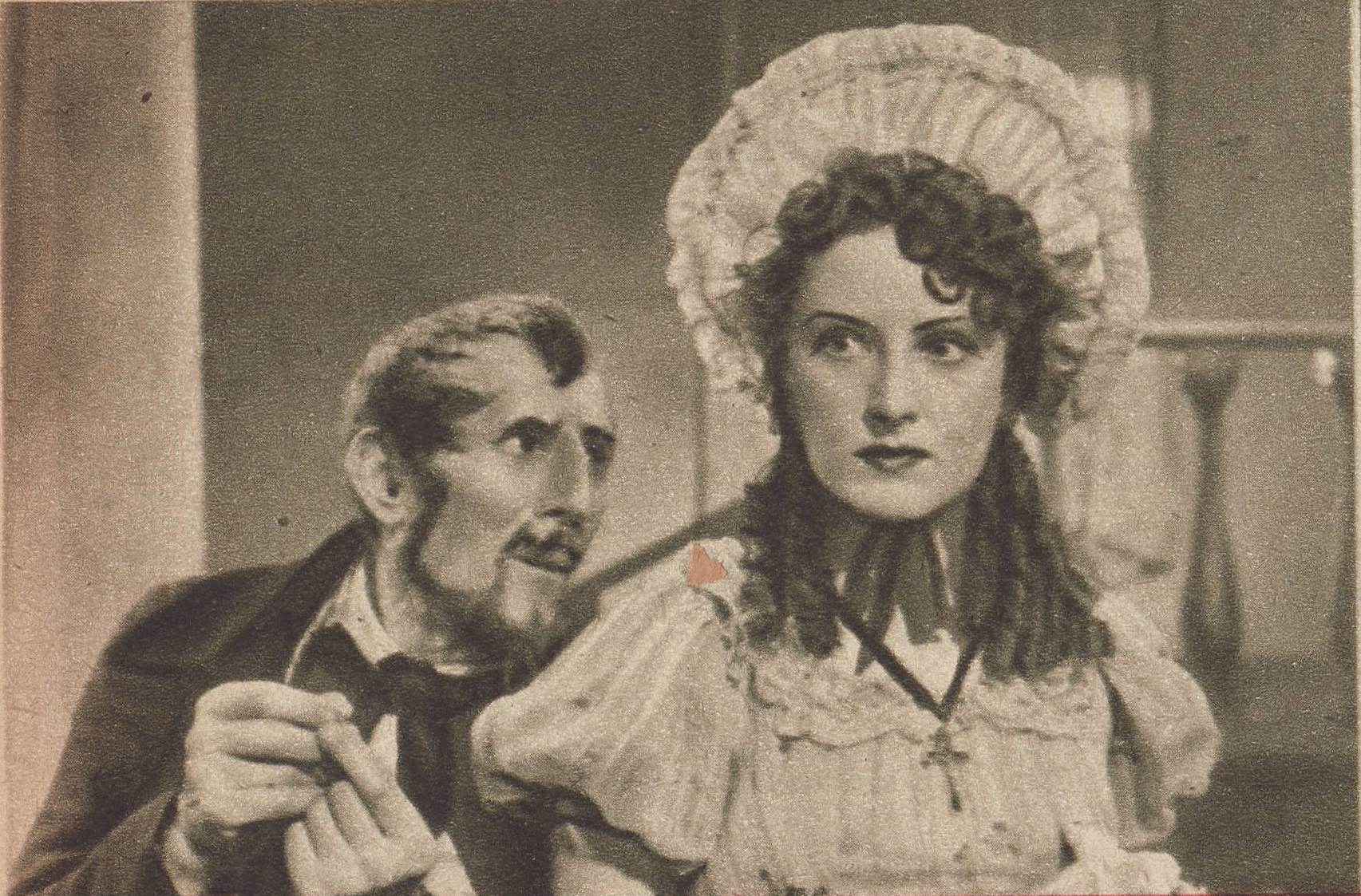
- Stanisława Angel-Engelówna in 1948
- Born: 23 April 1908; Warsaw, Congress Poland
- Died: 7 August 1958 (aged 50); Szczecin, Poland
- Occupation: Actress
- Years active: 1935-1948

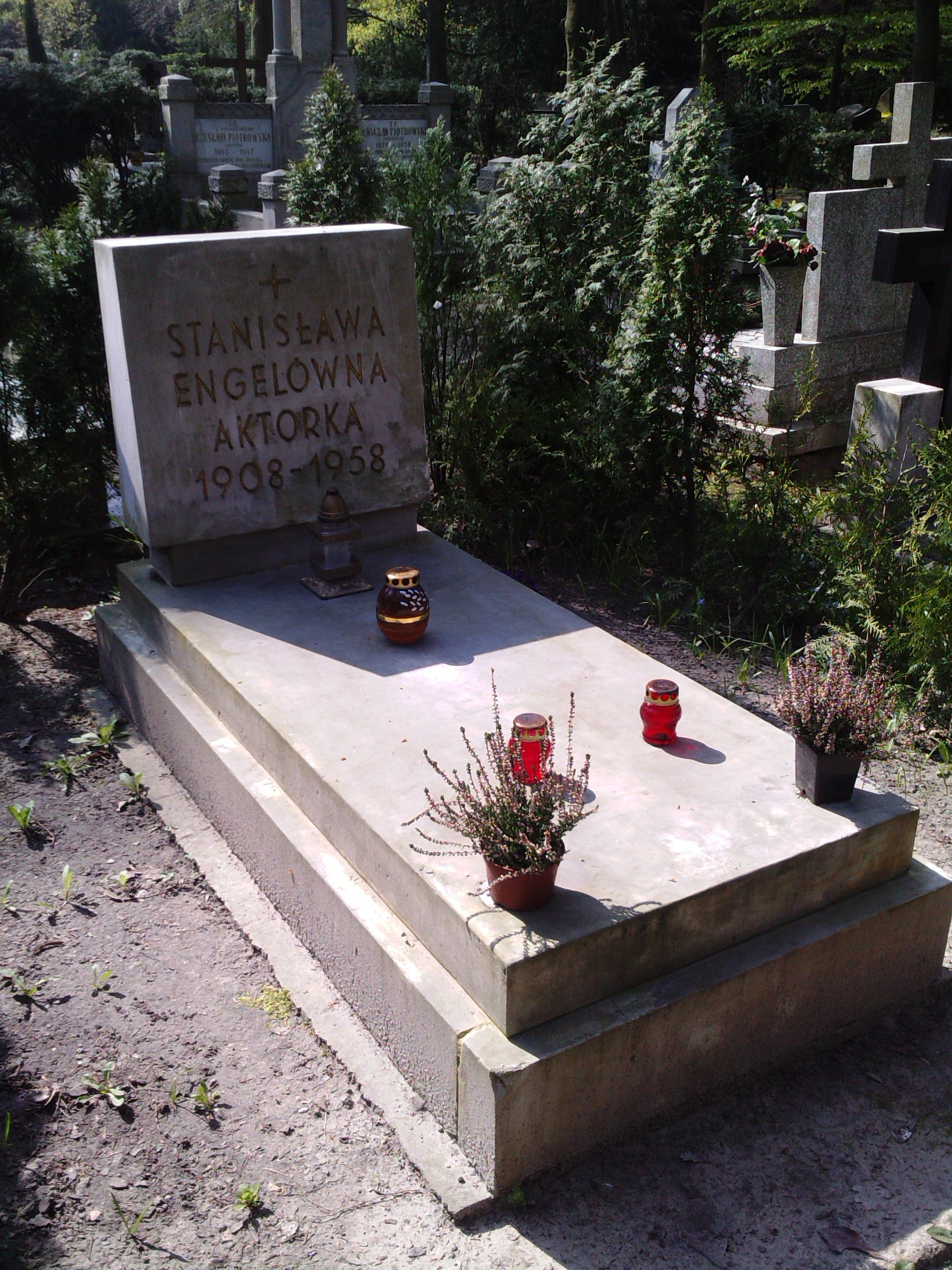
Grave of Stanisława Angel-Engelówna at the Central Cemetery in Szczecin

Stanisława Angel-Engelówna (23 April 1908 – 7 August 1958) was a Polish stage and film actress.

== Filmography ==
- Heather (1938)
- Serce matki (1938)
- Rena (1938)
- Florian (1938)
- O czym się nie mówi... (1939)
- Geniusz sceny (1939)
