= Jadwiga Andrzejewska =

Polish actress (1915–1977)

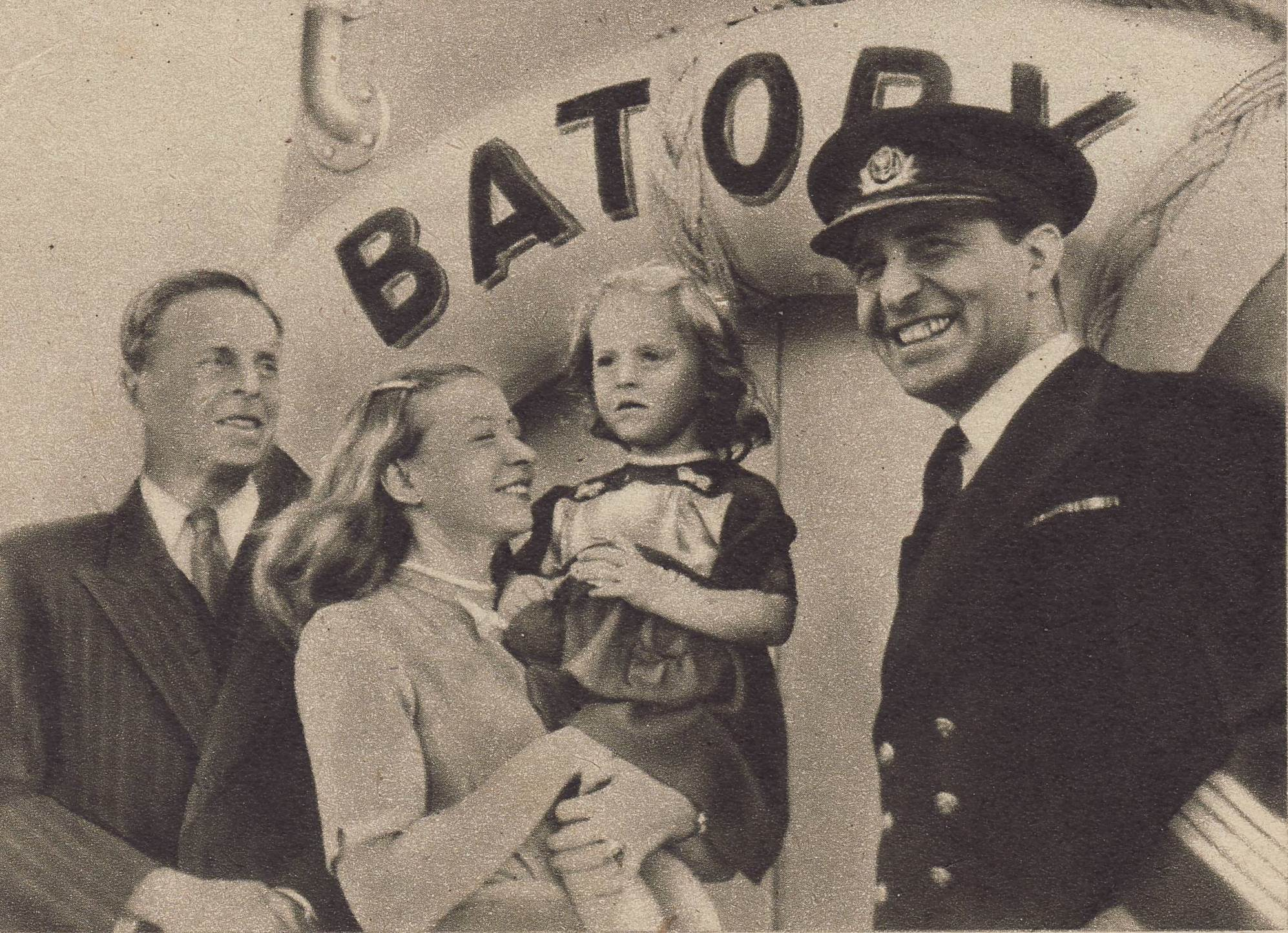
- Jadwiga Andrzejewska with her daughter Barbara, director Ryszard Ordyński, and merchant marine officer Jan Ćwikliński
- Born: 30 March 1915; Łódź
- Died: 4 October 1977 (aged 62); Łódź

Jadwiga Andrzejewska (1915–1977) was a Polish film and theater actress who was popular between the World Wars in Poland and Germany.

== Filmography ==
This filmography lists only most important movies:

- Milioner (1977)
- A jeśli będzie jesień... (1976)
- The Promised Land — Ziemia obiecana (1974)
- Motodrama (1971)
- 150 na godzinę (1971)
- Znicz olimpijski (1969)
- Czterej pancerni i pies (1968)
- Ortalionowy dziadek (1968)
- Cyrograf dojrzałości (1967)
- Poradnik matrymonialny (1967)
- Wieczór przedświąteczny (1966)
- Niedziela sprawiedliwości (1965)
- The Ashes (1965)
- Mam tu swój dom (1963)
- Dom bez okien (1962)
- Rodzina Milcarków (1962)
- Czas przeszły (1961)
- Komedianty (1961)
- Nafta (1961)
- Lunatycy (1959)
- Miejsce na ziemi (1959)
- Miasteczko (1958)
- Koniec nocy (1956)
- Pożegnanie z diabłem (1956)
- Ziemia (film) (1956)
- Pod Gwiazdą Frygijską (1954)
- Wielka droga (1946, in Italy)
- Doktór Murek (1939)
- Zapomniana melodia (1938)
- Strachy (1938)
- Moi rodzice rozwodzą się (1938)
- Kobiety nad przepaścią (1938)
- Parada Warszawy (1937)
- The Girls from Nowolipki (1937)
- Dorożkarz nr 13 (1937)
- Wierna rzeka (1936)
- Papa się żeni (1936)
- Ada! To nie wypada! (1936)
- 30 karatów szczęścia (1936)
- Wacuś (1935)
- Life Sentence (1933)
- The Story of Sin (1933)
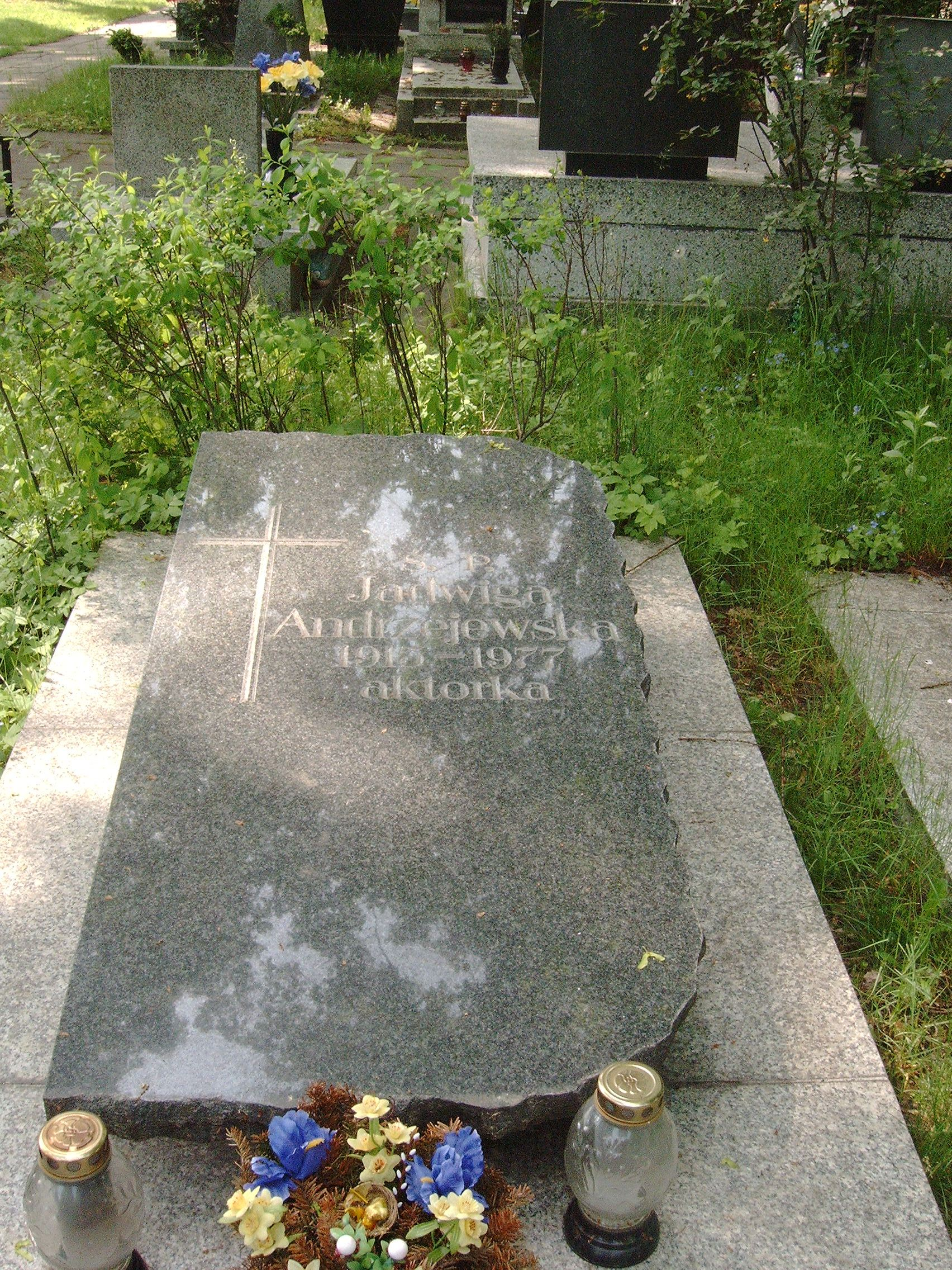
  Jadwiga Andrzejewska's grave in Łódź.
