= Ułan Księcia Józefa =

- Release date: 1937
- Country: Poland
- Language: Polish

Ułan Księcia Józefa is a Polish historical film. It was released on December 29, 1937.

== Cast ==
- Witold Conti as Lt. Andrzej Zodora
- Jadwiga Smosarska as Kasia
- Franciszek Brodniewicz as Prince Józef Poniatowski
- Stanislaw Sielanski as Antoni Koperek - orderly
