= Mieczysław Cybulski =

Polish actor (1903–1984)

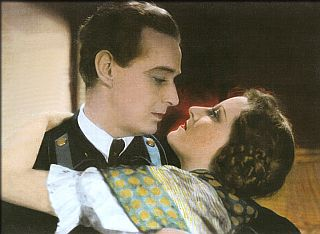
- Born: 16 March 1903; Biała Podlaska, Siedlce Governorate, Congress Poland, Russian Empire
- Died: 20 August 1984 (aged 81); Fort Lauderdale, Florida, United States
- Occupation: Actor
- Years active: 1927-1939

Mieczysław Cybulski (16 March 1903 – 20 August 1984) was a Polish film actor. He appeared in more than 25 films between 1927 and 1939.

== Selected filmography ==
- Rivals (1925)
- The Polish Marathon (1927)
- Sto metrów miłości (1932)
- Córka generała Pankratowa (1934)
- Młody Las (1934)
- Rapsodia Bałtyku (1935)
- Wierna rzeka (1936)
- Dodek na froncie (1936)
- Bohaterowie Sybiru (1936)
- Róża (1936)
- Bohaterowie Sybiru (1936)
- Rena (1938)
- Serce matki (1938)
- The Line (1938)
- Heather (1938)
- Second Youth (1938)
