= Sztandar Wolności =

Soviet Polish-language newspaper

Sztandar Wolności (English: The Banner of Freedom), was a Polish language newspaper published by the Communist Party of Byelorussia in the city of Minsk, between October 1940 and June 1941. The paper existed for less than a year following the Soviet invasion of Poland, and the annexation of Kresy into Byelorussian SSR. Its purpose was to bring the Soviet mindset closer to the ethnic Poles caught under conditions of occupation. Sztandar Wolności shut down during the subsequent German invasion of the Soviet Union, Operation Barbarossa.

The editorial staff was composed of Belarusians as well as prewar communists from Poland. The editor in-chief was Stefan Majchrowicz and the editorial staff also included Jakub Berman and Janina Broniewska. Meanwhile, all press published by Poland was dismantled and banned by the Red Army Directive # 1 of 16 September 1939, and its paper stock forcibly requisitioned.
