= Wierna rzeka (1936 film) =

1936 Polish film

Wierna rzeka is a Polish historical film directed by Leonard Buczkowski, based on a novel by Stefan Żeromski. It was released in 1936.

== Cast ==
- Barbara Orwid
- Jadwiga Andrzejewska
- Amelia Rotter-Jarnińska
- Mieczysław Cybulski
- Franciszek Brodniewicz
- Kazimierz Junosza-Stępowski
- Józef Węgrzyn
- Józef Orwid
- Jerzy Leszczyński
- Stanisław Sielański
- Jerzy Rygier
- Zygmunt Chmielewski
