= Jaśnie pan szofer =

- Directed by: Michał Waszyński
- Written by: Konrad Tom
- Release date: 13 September 1935
- Running time: 80 minutes
- Country: Poland
- Language: Polish

Jaśnie pan szofer is a 1935 Polish romantic comedy film directed by Michał Waszyński.

== Cast ==
- Eugeniusz Bodo ... Count Karol Boratyński
- Ina Benita ... Hania Pudłowiczówna
- Antoni Fertner ... Chairman Pudłowicz
- Tadeusz Olsza ... Antoni Łypko, the chauffeur
- Stanisława Wysocka ... Countess Boratyńska
- Ludwik Sempoliński ... Józef Kędziorek, crooked valet
- Wiktor Biegański
- Jan Bonecki
- Feliks Chmurkowski ... Anatol Szober, banker
- Loda Niemirzanka ... Kasia, maid
- Józef Redo ... Waiter
- Zofia Ślaska ... Nina Szoberowa
