= Pieśniarz Warszawy =

- Directed by: Michał Waszyński
- Written by: Eugeniusz Bodo, Jerzy Nel
- Release date: 24 February 1934
- Running time: 54 minutes
- Country: Poland
- Language: Polish

Pieśniarz Warszawy is a 1934 Polish film directed by Michał Waszyński.

== Cast ==
- Eugeniusz Bodo ... Julian Pagórski
- Maria Gorczyńska ... Peppita
- Barbara Gilewska ... Zosia
- Michał Znicz ... Eustachy, Julian's uncle
- Władysław Walter ... Duży Antoś
- Wiktor Biegański ... Lolo - Julians friend
- Stanisław Łapiński ... Detective Krópka
- Ludwik Fritsche ... Zosia's father
- Henryk Malkowski ... Cabaret Manager
- Henryk Rzętkowski ... Franciszek
- Elżbieta Kryńska
- Roman Dereń
- Mieczysław Bilażewski
