= 30 karatów szczęścia =

1936 film

- Directed by: Michał Waszyński
- Written by: Jan Fethke, Napoleon Sadek
- Release date: 1936
- Country: Poland
- Language: Polish

30 karatów szczęścia (30 Carats of Happiness) is a 1936 Polish comedy film directed by Michał Waszyński. The movie is written by Jan Fethke and Napoleon Sądek. Music created Henryk Wars.

== Cast ==
- Adolf Dymsza as Dodek
- Jadwiga Andrzejewska as Zoska
- Janina Brochwiczówna
- Maria Chmurkowska as The Actress
- Ludwik Fritsche as Valet
- Władysław Grabowski as Detective Raczek
- Wanda Jarszewska as Dobrowolska
- Wiktor Kazimierczak as The Magician
- Eugeniusz Koszutski as The Champ
- Józef Orwid as Pikulski
- Irena Skwierczyńska as Marcinowa
- Aleksander Suchcicki as The Magician's Aide
- Janina Wilczówna
