= Róża (1936 film) =

1936 film by Joseph Lejtes

- Directed by: Józef Lejtes
- Written by: Stefan Żeromski (play); Anatol Stern; Józef Lejtes
- Produced by: Marek M. Libkow
- Starring: Irena Eichlerówna; Witold Zacharewicz; Bogusław Samborski
- Edited by: Seweryn Steinwurzel
- Music by: Marian Neuteich; Roman Palester
- Production company: Libkow-Film
- Release date: 12 April 1926
- Running time: 87 minutes
- Country: Poland
- Language: Polish

Róża (English: The Rose) is a 1936 Polish historical film directed by Józef Lejtes and starring Irena Eichlerówna, Witold Zacharewicz and Bogusław Samborski. It is based on a play by Stefan Żeromski. The filmmakers experimented with camera shots and the soundtrack in order to create a "visual poetry".

== Cast ==
- Irena Eichlerówna - Krystyna
- Witold Zacharewicz - Jan Czarowic
- Bogusław Samborski - Benedykt Czarowic
- Kazimierz Junosza-Stępowski - Police inspector
- Lena Żelichowska - Maria
- Stefan Jaracz - Oset
- Michał Znicz - Anzelm
- Dobiesław Damięcki - Dan
- Mieczysław Cybulski - Grzegorz
- Zofia Lindorf - Grzegorz's wife
- Stanisław Łapiński - Ślaz
- Andrzej Szpaderski - Olek
- Janek Wróblewski - Michałek
- Stanisław Daniłowicz - Student
- Jan Hajduga - Kuźma
- Stefan Hnydziński - Soldier
- Zdzisław Karczewski - Peasant
- Julian Krzewiński - Peasant
- Henryk Małkowski - Peasant

== Bibliography ==
- Skaff, Sheila. The Law of the Looking Glass: Cinema in Poland, 1896-1939. Ohio University Press, 2008.
