= Serce matki =

1938 Polish film

- Directed by: Michał Waszyński
- Written by: Antoni Marczyński (novel), Leon Trystan (screenplay), Emanuel Schlechter, Tadeusz Wittlin (dialogue)
- Starring: Stanisława Angel-Engelówna, Irena Malkiewicz, Lidia Wysocka, Ina Benita, Kazimierz Wilamowski
- Cinematography: Albert Wywerka
- Music by: Ivo Wesby
- Production company: Terra-Film
- Release date: 22 December 1938
- Running time: 83 minutes
- Country: Poland
- Language: Polish

Serce matki (Polish for Mother's Heart) is a 1938 Polish melodrama film directed by Michał Waszyński.

== Cast ==
- Stanisława Angel-Engelówna as Maria
- Irena Malkiewicz as Elżbieta Borzęcka
- Lidia Wysocka as Lusia
- Ina Benita as Hanka
- Kazimierz Wilamowski as Wiesław Borzęcki
- Mieczysław Cybulski as Władysław
- Aleksander Zelwerowicz as schoolmaster
- Józef Orwid as shopkeeper
- Stanisław Sielański as veterinarian
