= Panienka z poste restante =

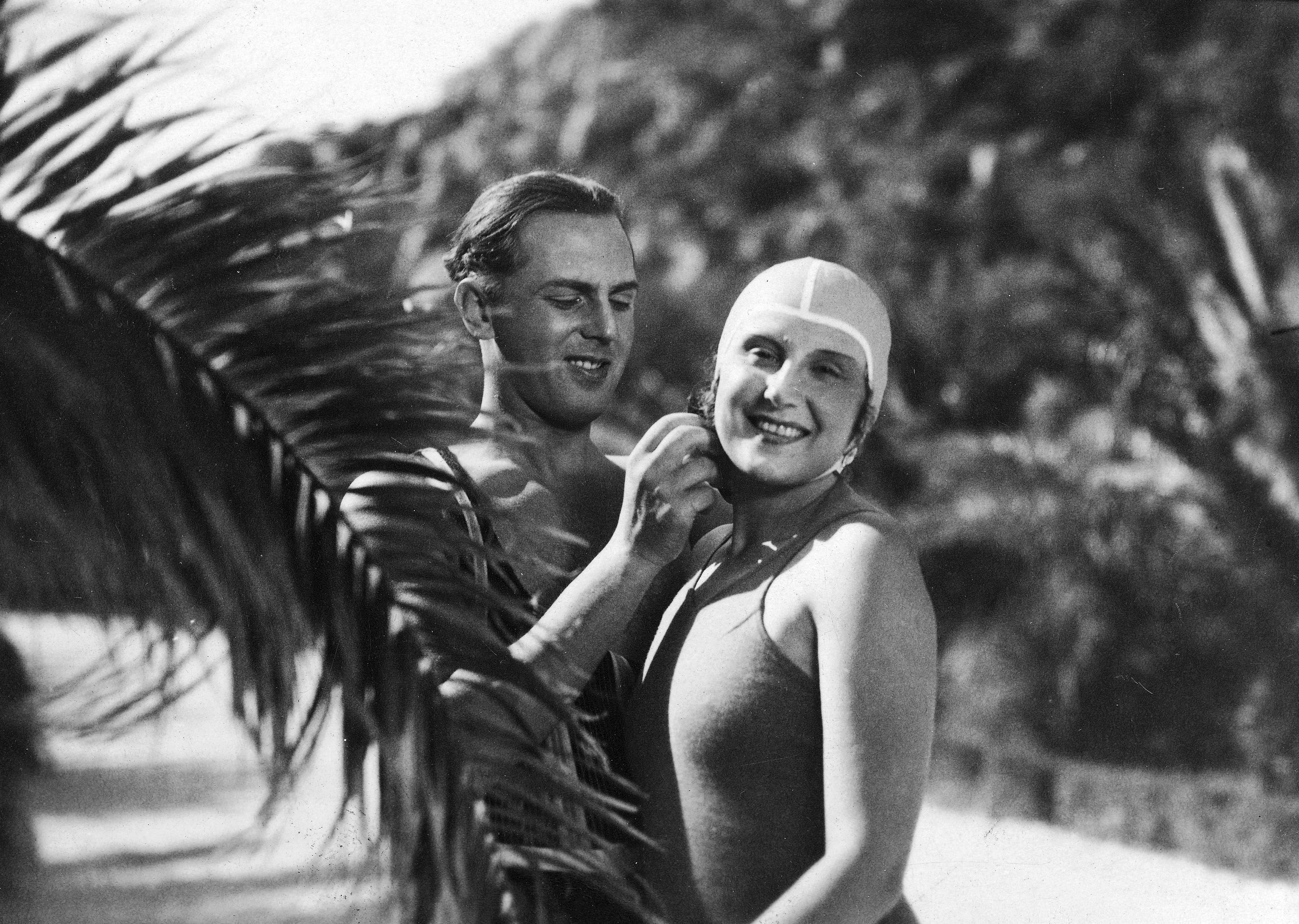
- Alma Kar and Aleksander Żabczyński
- Directed by: Jan Nowina-Przybylski and Michał Waszyński
- Written by: M. Król; Marian Hemar; O. Heker (novel)
- Music by: Henryk Wars
- Release date: 31 October 1935
- Running time: 78 minutes
- Country: Poland
- Language: Polish

Panienka z poste restante is a 1935 Polish romantic comedy film directed by Jan Nowina-Przybylski and Michał Waszyński.

== Cast ==
- Alma Kar ... Marysia Kochańska
- Aleksander Żabczyński ... Adam Olszewicz
- Michał Znicz ... Mr. Smith
- Mieczysława Ćwiklińska ... Mrs. Smith
- Władysław Walter ... Dobrzyński
- Romuald Gierasieński ... Kontroler
- Bazyli Sikiewicz ... Angersol
- Stefan Gulanicki ... 'Jean' Krawczuk (as Stefan Gucki)
