= Granny Had No Worries =

Nie miała baba kłopotu
- Directed by: Aleksander Ford and Michał Waszyński
- Written by: Andrzej Łomakowski (writer) and Napoleon Sądek (literary advisor)
- Release date: 9 November 1935
- Country: Poland
- Language: Polish

Granny Had No Worries (Polish: Nie miała baba kłopotu) is a 1935 Polish comedy film directed by Aleksander Ford and Michał Waszyński.

== Cast ==
- Barbara Gilewska ... Basia Boczkówna
- Władysław Walter ... Boczek
- Helena Zarembina ... Boczek's wife
- Witold Zacharewicz ... Janusz
- Michał Znicz ... Tailor
- Ludwik Lawiński ... Merchant
- Helena Buczyńska
- Tadeusz Fijewski
- Stanisław Sielański
- Irena Skwierczyńska
- Stefan Szczuka
- Michał Waszyński
- Halina Zawadzka
