= Lidia Wysocka =

Polish actress (1916–2006)

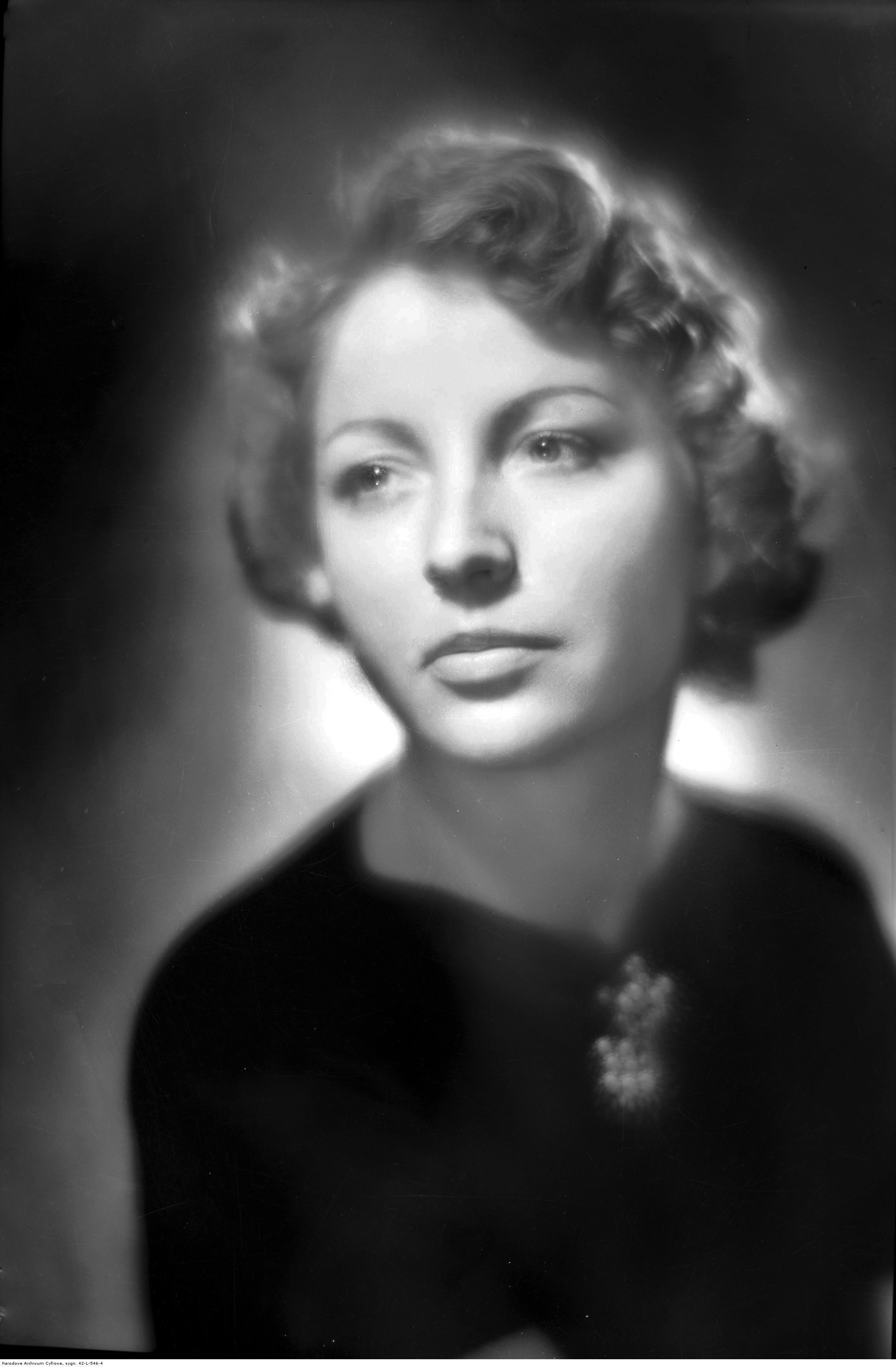
- Lidia Wysocka
- Born: June 24, 1916; Rahachow, Mogilev Governorate, Russian Empire (now Belarus)
- Died: January 2, 2006 (aged 89); Warsaw, Poland
- Occupations: Actress, singer, voice actor, director
- Spouse: Zbigniew Sawan (1943–1984; his death)

Lidia Wysocka (June 24, 1916 – January 2, 2006) was a Polish stage, film and voice actress, singer, cabaret performer and creative director, theatre director and costume designer, editorialist.

== Filmography ==
In 1934 she dubbed Madeleine Carroll's voice in the British film I Was a Spy (1933), the first movie dubbed in Poland (Siostra Marta jest szpiegiem).

- Kochaj tylko mnie (1935), as Hanka Żarska
- Papa się żeni (1936) as Lili, daughter of Mira Stella
- Gehenna (1938), as Ania Tarłówna
- Ostatnia brygada (1938) as Marta Rzecka
- Serce matki (1938) as Lusia
- Heather (1938) as Dębska
- Doktór Murek (1939) as Tunka Czabran
- Złota Maska (1939) as Magda Nieczaj
- Irena do domu! (1955), as Irena Majewska
- Sprawa pilota Maresza (1955), as Mary Godzicka
- Nikodem Dyzma (1956), as revue singer
- Rozstanie (1960), as Magdalena
- Sekret (1973), as Lena Nurkiewicz
- Zaczarowane podwórko (1974), as Queen Anna Jagiellonka
- W obronie własnej (1981), as Maria's mother

== Other ==
The production of her 9th movie, Szczęście przychodzi kiedy chce (directed by Mieczysław Krawicz) was cancelled by the outbreak of World War II. She was invited to star in another movie, Jacek Bławut's Lili (production title), telling the story of veteran actors, but it was still in pre-production phase at the time of her death; it was finally completed as Jeszcze nie wieczór as late as in 2008.

== Selected theatre work ==
(daily dates for premiere performances only)

- 1936, September 26 - The Posthumous Papers of the Pickwick Club by Charles Dickens, playing Mary, at Polish Theatre in Warsaw
- 1936, December 31 - The Marriage of Figaro by Pierre Beaumarchais, playing Fanchette, at Polish Theatre in Warsaw
- 1937, July 8 - Papa by Gaston Arman de Caillavet, playing Jeanne Aubrin, at Polish Theatre in Warsaw
- 1937, November 9 - Gałązka rozmarynu by Zygmunt Nowakowski, playing Mania, at Polish Theatre in Warsaw
- 1938, March 30 - November Night by Stanisław Wyspiański, playing Małgorzata, at Polish Theatre, Warsaw
- 1938, May 20 - Dalilla by Ferenc Molnár, playing Ilonka, at Mały Theatre, Warsaw
- 1938, December 14 - Temperamenty by Antoni Cwojdziński, playing Stefcia, at Mały Theatre, Warsaw
- 1939, March 28 - The Importance of Being Earnest by Oscar Wilde, at Mały Theatre, Warsaw
- 1944, May 27 - Due dozzine di rose scarlatte by Aldo De Benedetti, playing Maria Verani, at Teatr Małych Form Miniatury, Warsaw
- 1946, February 12 - Freuda teoria snów by Antoni Cwojdziński, playing She, at Mały Theatre (MTD), Warsaw
- 1946, July 2 - Village wooing by George Bernard Shaw, at Mały Theatre (MTD), Warsaw
- 1947, May 24 - Much Ado About Nothing by William Shakespeare, playing Beatrice, at Mały Theatre (MTD), Warsaw
- 1948, January 13 - Man and Wife by Aleksander Fredro, playing Justysia, at Teatr Miniatury (MTD), Warsaw
- 1948, May 26 - Jadzia wdowa by Ryszard Ruszkowski, playing Jadwiga, at New Theatre, Warsaw
- 1949, January 22, Much Ado About Nothing by William Shakespeare, playing Beatrice, at Polish Theatre in Szczecin
- 1949, March 9 - Norwegian spring by Stuart Engstrand, at Polish Theatre in Szczecin - directing
- 1949, April 18 - Jadzia wdowa by Ryszard Ruszkowski, playing Jadwiga, at Polish Theatre in Szczecin - also costume designer
- 1949, August 16 - Blithe Spirit by Noël Coward, at Polish Theatre in Szczecin - costume designer
- 1949, October 27 - Сказка by Mikhail Arkadyevich Svetlov, playing Katia, at Polish Theatre in Szczecin
- 1950, January 16 - Germans by Leon Kruczkowski, at Teatry Dramatyczne (Teatr Współczesny) in Szczecin - costume designer
- 1951, January 6 - Sir Gil of the Green Stockings by Tirso de Molina, playing Donna Diana, at Teatr Nowy (Scena Komediowo-Muzyczna), Warsaw
- 1951, July 28 - Ojciec debiutantki by D. Leński, at Ludowy Teatr Muzyczny, Warsaw - directing
- 1951, October 8 - Sir Gil of the Green Stockings by Tirso de Molina, at Aleksander Wegierka Theatre, Bialystok - directing
- 1952, September 17 - Biuro docinków, Teatr Satyryków, Warsaw
- 1959, January 11 - Man and Wife by Aleksander Fredro, playing Justysia - also directing
- 1961, February 15 - Les petites têtes by Max Régnier, playing Irene, at Comedy Theatre, Warsaw
- 1977, April 24 - Będziemy obrażać!, at Syrena Theatre in Warsaw
- 1979, January 17 - Wielki Dodek by Witold Filler & Jonasz Kofta, playing Miss Stefania, at Syrena Theatre in Warsaw
- 1980, July 5 - Warto byś wpadł by Ryszard Marek Groński & Antoni Marianowicz, at Syrena Theatre in Warsaw
- 1981, February 27 - The Good Soldier Švejk by Jaroslav Hašek, playing Mamon, at Syrena Theatre in Warsaw
- 1981, July 16 - Wizyta młodszej pani by Ryszard Marek Groński & Michał Komar, playing Ms. Loda, at Syrena Theatre in Warsaw

== Early career ==
One of the top finalists of the beauty contest organized by the Kino magazine in 1933. After recording a dubbing, she debuted on film in 1935 while she was still studying acting under Aleksander Zelwerowicz (who was very reluctant to allow his students to start their acting career before they finish school). Graduated Państwowy Instytut Sztuki Teatralnej (State Institute of Theatrical Arts, Warsaw) in 1936. Debuted on stage in Polish Theatre in Warsaw in 1936 (with Dickens' The Pickwick Papers as Mary, starting a three-year contract), where she performed until the war.

Her movie roles included singing parts; the songs she performed were available on gramophone record released by Syrena Record as early as in 1936.

She could be heard not only on Polskie Radio; for instance, from November 1936 she was reading the first serialized novel written for Polish radio, Dni powszednie państwa Kowalskich (The Daily Life of the Kowalskis), released in print in 1938 by Maria Kuncewiczowa), but also by dialing ... the speaking clock number (she was the voice of the improved telephone device launched in Poland, in 1936).

== World War II ==
As most of the actors who boycotted German-controlled theatres during the war, she had to find another way to make a living: she worked as waitress in "Na Antresoli" café. She rejected offers to start working for German UFA, at that time dealing mostly with pro-Nazi propaganda movies. Blacklisted, she was taken hostage (along with other Polish artists) by Gestapo in 1941 and held in the Pawiak prison Her husband Zbigniew Sawan ended up in Auschwitz as German retaliation for the assassination of Igo Sym, a Nazi spy.

== Post-war years ==
After the war she started performing in Teatr Mały in Warsaw alongside her husband, later also in Teatr Miniatura in Warsaw and Teatr Nowy. They moved next (1947–1949) to Polish Theatre in Szczecin, where Sawan would take the manager seat. The couple returned to Warsaw in 1949 and started working in Teatr Ludowy: Sawan again as the manager, while she started directing plays. She had spent 1951–53 in Buffo revue theatre.

== Wagabunda Cabaret ==
In 1956 she created the Wagabunda cabaret (in Poland meaning: a mixture of stand up comedy, theatre and music, with a prominent addition of political satire), which gathered such actors and satirists as Edward Dziewoński, Wiesław Michnikowski, Kazimierz Rudzki, Jacek Fedorowicz, Bogumił Kobiela, singer Maria Koterbska, Jeremi Przybora, Mieczysław Wojnicki, Marian Załucki, Mieczysław Czechowicz, Zbigniew Cybulski, etc.; texts for songs, monologues and sketches supplied by Stefania Grodzieńska or poets Julian Tuwim and Jan Brzechwa. Popular in Poland for over a decade, it also toured USA and Canada (1957, 1962, 1964), United Kingdom (1965, 1966), Israel (1963), USSR (1968) and Czechoslovakia (1956) (in total over 2 million tickets sold, according to its manager, W. Furman). She was its art director and a leading star, often performing sung poetry or versions of popular songs (particularly French ones) with Polish lyrics.

== Late career ==
After Wagabunda dissolved in 1968 she had problem finding work in Warsaw's theatres despite her experience and fame. Finally she found her way to the stage of Teatr Syrena in Warsaw, where she played in revues in 1974 through 1981. She also toured the United States with it. Apart from TV broadcasts of her recitals (as early as in 1956, while Telewizja Polska was still in the test stage of its second - post war - launch) and interviews, she appeared on satirical TV shows such as Teatr Rozrywki.
Her last TV interview was released by Kino Polska Channel in 2011.

During her career she also worked with Polish public broadcaster Polskie Radio, taking part in concerts and other broadcasts. She appeared in radio dramas as early as in late 1930s; listeners of Program 1 station could still catch her in 1980s/1990s reading her own editorials on cultural news, displaying literary and satirical talent.

She was awarded the Order of Polonia Restituta, Officer's Cross, for outstanding achievement in artistic work (1999), Gold Cross of Merit (1978) and other honors.

== Bibliography/Publicity ==
- cover and note in Kino, 1935 issue 28, pages 2,12, 14 July 1935
- cover and interview in Kino, 1938 issue 10, page 7, 6 March 1938
- cover and note in Kino, 1938 issue 38
- cover of Radio i świat weekly magazine, issue 9 (81), 3-9/03/1947
- cover of Film, issue 16, 21 April 1957
- cover of Ekran, issue 38, 18 September 1960
- cover of Film, issue 40, 2 October 1960
- pictorial, Film, issue 41, 1960, page 7
- W obronie własnej in Filmowy serwis prasowy, issue 21, 1981, pages 5–7
- Henryk Czerwiński (2000). Leksykon Sztuki Filmowej (1895–2000) (in Polish). Warszawa.
