= Rena (film) =

- Directed by: Michał Waszyński
- Written by: Eugeniusz Bunda (writer), Marek Romanski (novel)
- Release date: 1938
- Running time: 79 minutes
- Country: Poland
- Language: Polish

Rena is a 1938 Polish drama film directed by Michał Waszyński.

== Cast ==
- Stanisława Angel-Engelówna ... Rena Laska
- Mieczysław Cybulski ... Janusz Garda
- Tekla Trapszo ... Mother Laska
- Kazimierz Junosza-Stępowski... Prosecutor Garda
- Loda Niemirzanka ... Kazia, the blond
- Jacek Woszczerowicz ... Uncle Ryszard Garda
- Józef Węgrzyn ... Szalski, the store director
- Stanisław Sielański ... Wasik, toy department clerk
- Janina Krzymuska ... The Washer Woman
- Jadwiga Bukojemska ... Klientka domu towarowego
- Jerzy Chodecki
- Halina Cieszkowska
- Tadeusz Pilarski
- Irena Skwierczyńska
- Zbigniew Ziembinski
