= Józef Lejtes =

Polish screenwriter and film director (1901–1983)

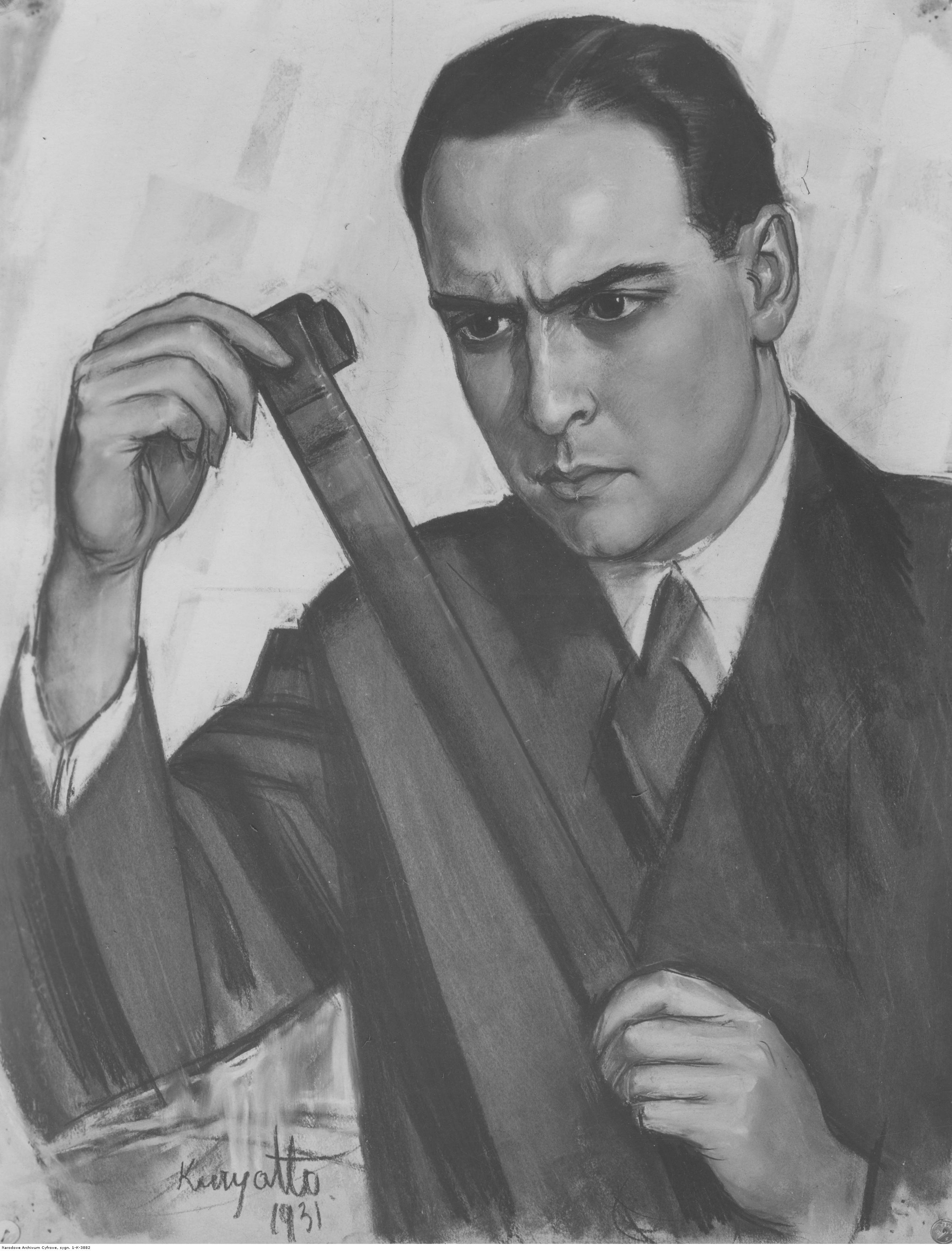
- Born: 22 November 1901; Warsaw, Poland
- Died: 27 May 1983 (aged 81); Santa Monica, California, U.S.
- Occupations: Screenwriter, film director
- Years active: 1928–1970

Józef Lejtes (22 November 1901 – 27 May 1983) was a Polish screenwriter and film director. He later worked in Israel and the United States.

== Selected filmography ==
Poland:

- Huragan (1928)
- Z dnia na dzień (1929)
- Dzikie pola (1932)
- Pod Twoją obronę (1933)
- Młody las (1934)
- Córka generała Pankratowa (1934)
- Dzień wielkiej przygody (1935)
- Barbara Radziwiłłówna (1936)
- Róża (1936)
- The Girls from Nowolipki (1937)
- The Line (1938)
- Sygnały (1938)
- Kościuszko pod Racławicami (1938)
- Od Latrum do Gazali (1942)

Israel:

- My Father's House (1947)
- Wielka obietnica (1947)
- Nie ma wyboru (1949)
- Ein Breira (1949)

United States:

- The Faithful City (1952)
- Krzywda i zemsta (1954)
- Passion (1954)
- Dolina tajemnicy (1967)
- The Counterfeit Killer (1968)

== Bibliography ==
- Skaff, Sheila. The Law of the Looking Glass: Cinema in Poland, 1896-1939. Ohio University Press, 2008.
