= Złota Maska =

- Directed by: Jan Fethke
- Written by: Jan Fethke, Napoleon Sądek
- Based on: Złota Maska and Wysokie progi by Tadeusz Dołęga-Mostowicz
- Starring: Lidia Wysocka, Aleksander Żabczyński, Władysław Walter
- Cinematography: Seweryn Steinwurzel
- Music by: Zygmunt Wiehler
- Production company: Elektra-Film
- Release date: 14 September 1940 (Poland)
- Running time: 75 minutes
- Country: Poland
- Language: Polish

Złota Maska (Polish for Golden Mask) is a Polish melodrama film directed by Jan Fethke based on two novels by Tadeusz Dołęga-Mostowicz. Although shot and scheduled for release in 1939, the post-production was interrupted by the outbreak of World War II, the subsequent need to pass German censorship meant it received only limited release in occupied Poland in 1940. The copy which survived has altered credits and subplot removed — scenes with Igo Sym (Nazi collaborator) were cut after the war.

== Cast ==
- Lidia Wysocka – Magda Nieczaj
- Aleksander Żabczyński – Ksawery Runicki
- Władysław Walter – Nieczaj, father of Magda and Adela
- Mieczysława Ćwiklińska – Runicka, Ksawery's mother
- Maria Buchwald – Adela Nieczaj
- Irena Wasiutyńska – Mira Borychowska
- Stefan Hnydziński – Biesiadowski
- Józef Orwid – uncle Zaklesiński
- Jerzy Kobusz – Kamionka, the apprentice
- Zofia Wilczyńska – chambermaid
- Leszek Pośpiełowski – count Gucio
- Andrzej Bogucki – baron Wolski
- Aleksander Bogusiński – Jan, the butler
- Feliks Żukowski – Pieczynga, the estate manager
- Janina Krzymuska – Polkowska
- Helena Zarembina – gossiper
- Wanda Orzechowska – Karnicka
- Jadwiga Zaklicka – Mira's friend
- Igo Sym – Raszewski
