= Wacuś =

- Directed by: Michał Waszyński
- Written by: Napoleon Sadek, Konrad Tom
- Release date: October 3, 1935
- Running time: 59 minutes
- Country: Poland
- Language: Polish

Wacuś is a 1935 Polish romantic comedy film directed by Michał Waszyński.

== Cast ==
- Adolf Dymsza ... Tadeusz Rosolek, alias Wacus Rosolek
- Jadwiga Andrzejewska ... Kazia Wolska
- Mieczysława Ćwiklińska ... The Widow Centkowska
- Władysław Grabowski ... Dr. Lecki
- Maria Korska ... Mother Wolska
- Józef Orwid ... Pawnshop Owner
- Eugeniusz Koszutski ... Antoni, pawnshop guard
- Jerzy Marr ... Roman 'Franek' Suzinik, cousin
- Klemens Mielczarek ... Kubuś, teenage boarder
- Michał Halicz ... Gypsy on Horseback
- Jerzy Kobusz ... Pietrusiński, football goalie
- Irena Skwierczyńska ... Gypsy Wife
- Konrad Tom ... Cosmeticians' School Director
- Leon Rechenski ... School Watchman
- Feliks Chmurkowski ... The Schoolteacher
