= Michał Waszyński =

Polish-American film director and producer (1904–1965)

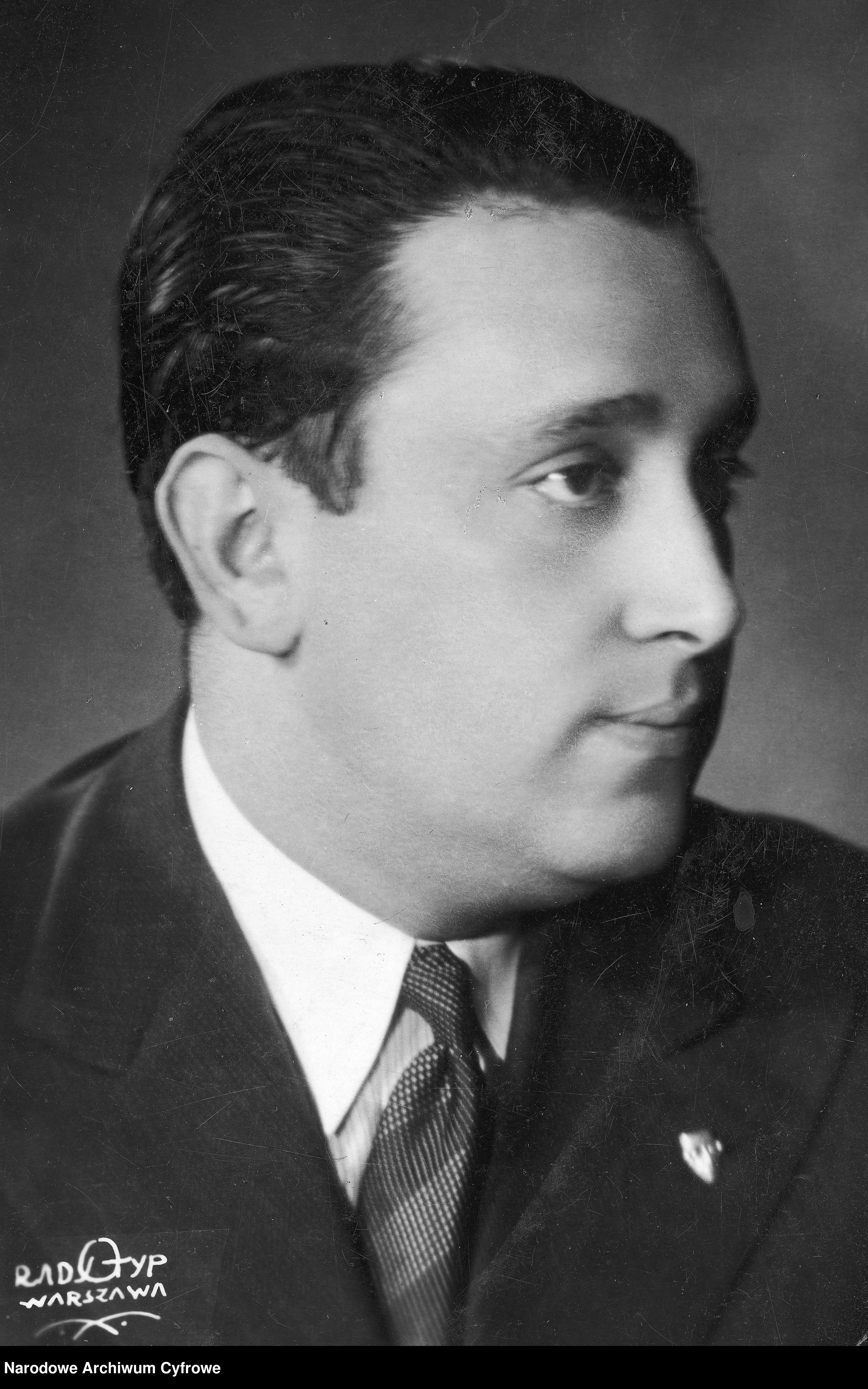
- Portrait of Waszyński, 1934.
- Born: Mosze Waks; 29 September 1904; Kowel, Volhynia Governorate, Russian Empire
- Died: 20 February 1965 (aged 60); Madrid, Francoist Spain
- Occupations: Producer, Film director
- Years active: 1922–1948

Michał Waszyński (born Mosze Waks; 29 September 1904 – 20 February 1965) was a Polish-born film director and film producer who worked in Poland, Italy, and later on major American film productions based primarily in Spain under the name Michael Waszynski. Renowned for his elegance and refined manners, he was nicknamed “the prince” by acquaintances.

== Early years ==
Waszyński was born as Mosze Waks into a Jewish family in 1904 in Kovel, a small town in Volhynia (now in Ukraine), which at the time was part of Imperial Russia. He came from a moderately wealthy Jewish family of Hasidic descent. His father Piotr was a blacksmith, and his mother, Cecylia (née Flesz), a poultry merchant. Waks's artistic inclinations were noticed while still in cheder, although he was also regarded as an undisciplined child. In 1918, he was expelled from the yeshiva in Kovel, according to his own account, for asking about the existence of devils, for which he was slapped by a teacher. A year later, he left Kovel.

In Kyiv, Waks participated in local theater productions, collaborating on a puppet theater with Konstantin Mardzhanov, Grigori Kozintsev, Sergei Yutkevich, and Aleksei Kapler. From Ukraine, he moved first to Warsaw and later to Berlin. As a young man he worked as an assistant director under the legendary German director F.W. Murnau.

In 1922, while living in Warsaw, he changed his name to the more Polish-sounding Michał Waszyński at the suggestion of director Wiktor Biegański, and converted to Catholicism.

== Prewar career ==
In 1931, Waszyński moved from the poorer predominantly Jewish district of Muranów to Warsaw's more upscale Saska Kępa neighborhood. Throughout the coming decade, he became a prolific film director in Poland, directing 37 of the 147 films made in Poland in that decade, or one out of four.

Along with popular films in Polish produced for a wide local audience, he returned to his native language of Yiddish when in 1937 he directed an important film in The Dybbuk. Based on the widely-produced play by author and ethnographer S. An-sky, the film is often considered among the greatest achievements of Yiddish cinema. Released internationally, Waszyński's The Dybbuk is regarded by scholars today as a monument of the rich cultural life of East European Jewry before the Holocaust.

== War years ==
At the beginning of World War II Waszyński fled to Białystok. That city was taken in mid-September 1939 by the Germans, but within weeks, as a result of the Molotov–Ribbentrop pact, the city was given to the Soviet Union and occupied by its army. Waszyński began a new career as a theater director, first in Białystok and later in Moscow, before being exiled by Soviet authorities to Siberia.

Then, in the summer of 1941, after Germany invaded the Soviet Union, Waszyński joined the newly formed Polish Army of general Władysław Anders (loyal to the Polish government in Exile in London) and subsequently was relocated to Persia (Iran), Iraq, Mandatory Palestine, and later, as a soldier of the 2nd Corps of the Polish Army, to Egypt and Italy. As a member of the army film unit, he filmed the Battle of Monte Cassino, where the Polish Army suffered great losses, but helped to win the day. After World War II, he stayed in Italy, where he directed a Polish-language feature film about the Battle of Monte Cassino, and then three Italian films.

== International career ==
Later in his career, Waszyński worked as a producer for the major American studios in Italy and (primarily) Spain, credited as Michael Waszynski. His credits include The Quiet American (1958) (associate producer), El Cid (1961), and The Fall of the Roman Empire (film) (1964) (executive producer and associate producer).

He died of a heart attack on 20 February 1965 in Madrid and was buried in a ceremonious Roman Catholic funeral in Rome.

== Filmography ==
- William Tell (1949)
- La Grande strada (1948) Polish film produced in Italy, (1946, Italian version completed in 1948, with the collaboration of Vittorio Cottafavi); with Jadwiga Andrzejewska
- Fire Over the Sea (1947)
- The Unknown Man of San Marino (1946)
- Wielka droga (1946)
- Monte Cassino (1944)
- Mp. Adama i Ewy (1944)
- Dzieci (1943)
- Pobyt generala Wl. Sikorskiego na Srodkowym Wschodzie (1943)
- Polska parada (1943)
- Kronika wojenna nr 1 (1942)
- Marsz do wolnosci (1942)
- Od pobudki do capstrzyku (1942)
- The Three Hearts (1939)
- At the End of the Road (1939)
- The Vagabonds (1939)
- Serce matki (1938)
- Gehenna (1938)
- Profesor Wilczur (1938)
- Ostatnia brygada (1938)
- Druga młodość (1938)
- Kobiety nad przepaścią (1938)
- Rena (1938)
- The Dybbuk (1937)
- Znachor (1937)
- Papa się żeni (1936)
- Bohaterowie Sybiru (1936)
- Dodek na froncie (1936)
- 30 karatów szczęścia (1936)
- Będzie lepiej (1936)
- Bolek i Lolek (1936)
- Nie miała baba kłopotu (1935)
- Panienka z poste restante (1935)
- Wacuś (1935)
- Jaśnie pan szofer (1935)
- ABC miłości (1935)
- Antek policmajster (1935)
- Czarna perła (1934)
- Kocha, lubi, szanuje (1934)
- Pieśniarz Warszawy (1934)
- Parada rezerwistów (1934)
- Co mój mąż robi w nocy (1934)
- Zabawka (1933)
- Prokurator Alicja Horn (1933)
- Dvanáct kresel (1933)
- Jego ekscelencja subiekt (1933)
- Sto metrów miłości (1932)
- Głos pustyni (1932)
- Bezimienni bohaterowie (1932)
- Uwiedziona (1931)
- Niebezpieczny romans (1930)
- Kult ciała (1930)
- Pod banderą miłości (1929)
- Jealousy (1922)
