= Młody Las =

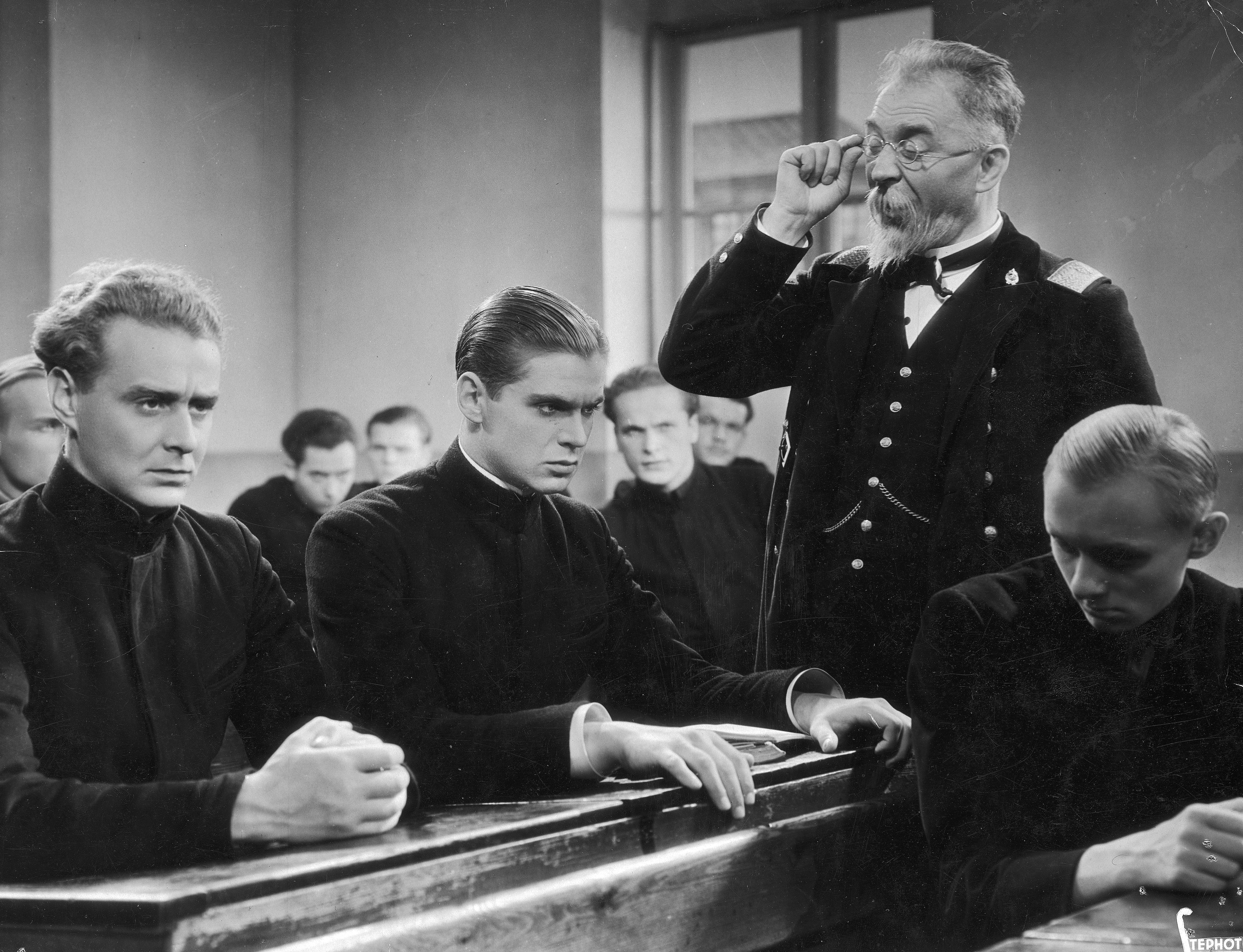
- Directed by: Józef Lejtes
- Starring: Anatol Stern
- Release date: 23 July 1934
- Running time: 71 minutes
- Country: Poland
- Language: Polish

Młody Las is a Polish historical film. It was released in 1934.

== Cast ==
- Kazimierz Junosza-Stępowski - Professor Pakotin
- Bogusław Samborski - School Director Nikołaj Iwanowicz Starogrenacki
- Maria Bogda - Wanda Lityńska
- Adam Brodzisz - Stefan Kiernicki
- Stefan Jaracz - Professor Kiernicki, Jan's father
- Mieczysław Cybulski - Jan Walczak
- Witold Zacharewicz - Antoni Majewski
- Tekla Trapszo - Walczakowa, Jan's mother
- Maria Balcerkiewiczówna - Jakubowska, mother of pupil
- Michał Znicz - Attenot "Ciapciuś", the French Professor
- Władysław Walter - The One-Armed Security Guard
- Tadeusz Fijewski - Pupil
- Jonas Turkow - Student
- Alina Halska - Zofia Strońska
- Paweł Owerłło - Professor
- Antoni Bednarczyk - Professor
- Władysław Surzyński - Von Stolpe, Russian officer
- Helena Sulimowa - Girls' school headmistress
- Amelia Rotter-Jarnińska - Majewski, Antoni's mother
- Kazimierz Pawlowski - Pupil Franek Pszczółkowski
- Wiktor Biegański - Profesor Żewakow
- Władysław Walter - Terteńko, janitor
- Józef Orwid - Drunkard
- Jan Szymański - Majewski, Antoni's father
- Saturnin Żórawski - Jurek, Stefan's brother
- Maria Zarembińska - Irka
- Stanisław Daniłowicz - Delegate of strike committees at secret meeting
- Jerzy Kobusz - Pupil
- Leszek Pośpiełowski - Student
- Mieczysław Bilażewski - Pupil
- Stefan Szczuka - Professor
- Józef Małgorzewski - Pupil
- Eugeniusz Koszutski
- Bronisław Lipski
- Aleksander Buczyński
