= Police Chief Antek =

Antek policmajster
- Directed by: Michał Waszyński
- Written by: Konrad Tom, Emanuel Schlechter, Anatol Stern
- Starring: Adolf Dymsza
- Music by: Henryk Wars
- Release date: February 11, 1935
- Running time: 91 minutes
- Country: Poland
- Language: Polish

Police Chief Antek (Antek policmajster) is a 1935 Polish comedy film directed by Michał Waszyński.

== Cast ==
- Mieczysława Ćwiklińska... The Governor's Wife
- Maria Bogda ... The Governor's Servant
- Adolf Dymsza ... Antek Król
- Antoni Fertner ... The Governor
- Konrad Tom ... Officer
- Wanda Jarszewska ... The Governor's Older Sister
- Stefania Górska ... The Governor's Daughter
- Helena Zarembina ... The Governor's Uglier Sister (as Helena Zarebina)
- Józef Kondrat ... Felek
- Czesław Skonieczny ... Police Chief Semyon Fyodorovich Wypiwajlo
- Ludwik Lawiński ... Barber
- Feliks Chmurkowski ... The Psychiatrist
- Józef Orwid ... Russian Businessman
- Stanisław Łapiński ... Russian Businessman
- Zygmunt Regro-Regirer ... Orchestra Leader
