= Niebezpieczny romans =

1930 film

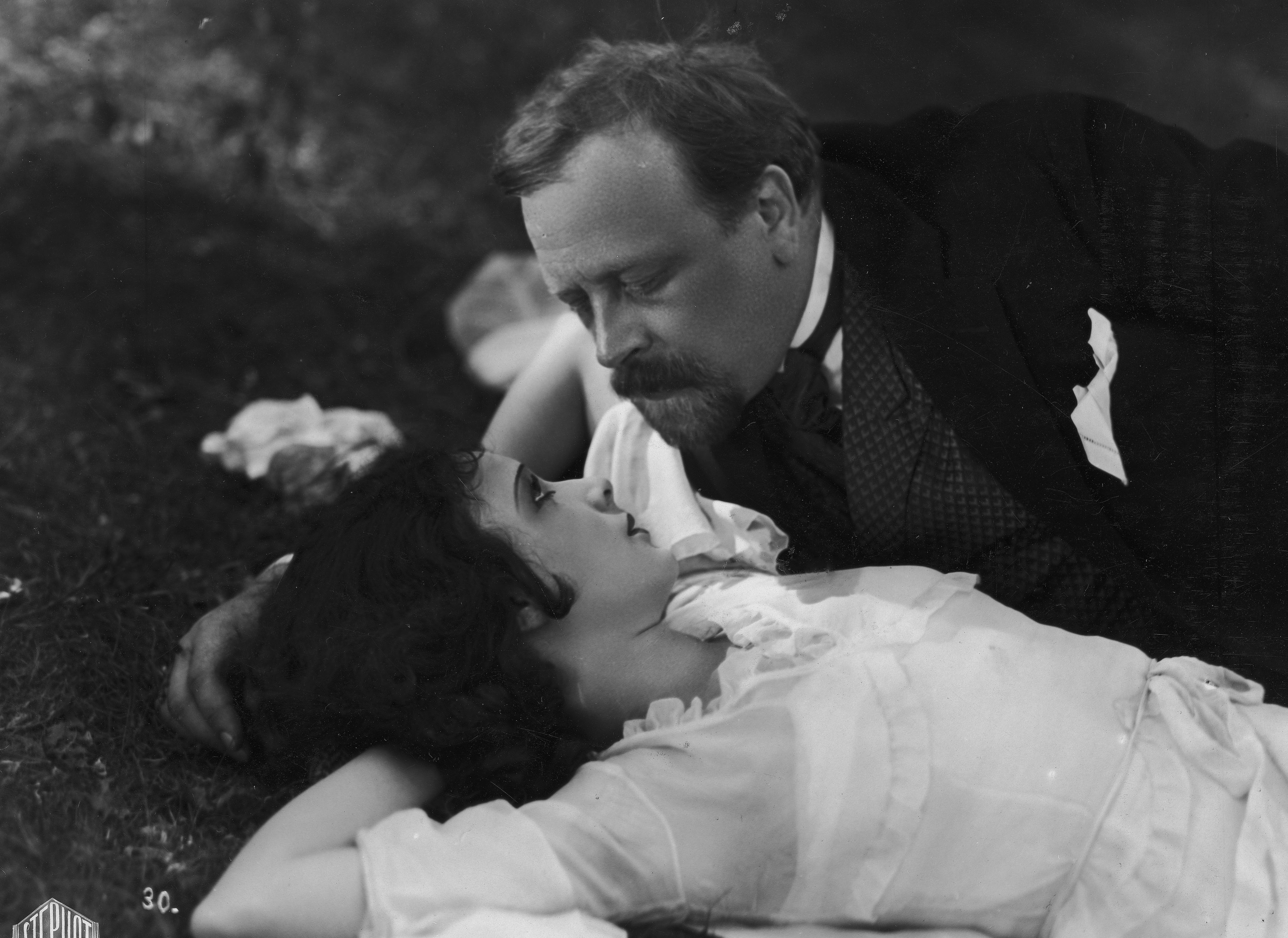
- Niebezpieczny romans (1930)
- Directed by: Michał Waszyński
- Written by: Anatol Stern, Andrzej Strug
- Starring: Bogusław Samborski
- Release date: 18 October 1930
- Country: Poland
- Language: Polish

Niebezpieczny romans is a 1930 Polish film directed by Michał Waszyński.

== Cast ==
- Bogusław Samborski ... Hieronim Spiewankiewicz
- Helena Stepowska ... Mrs. Spiewankiewiczowa
- Józef Orski ... Hieronim's Son
- Betty Amann ... Ada
- Eugeniusz Bodo ... The Burglar Chieftain
- Zula Pogorzelska ... The Maid
- Adolf Dymsza ... The Maid's Admirer
- Kazimierz Krukowski ... The Fence
- Paweł Owerłło ... The Bank Director
- Stefan Szwarc ... Jancio
- Lucjan Kraszewski ... Lucek 'Wykalaczka'
- Leon Rechenski ... Karaluch
- Kazimierz Rawicz ... Lalus
- Czesław Raniszewski ... Majsterek
- Antoni Adamczyk... Morda
- Lech Owron... Detective
