= Sto metrów miłości =

1932 film

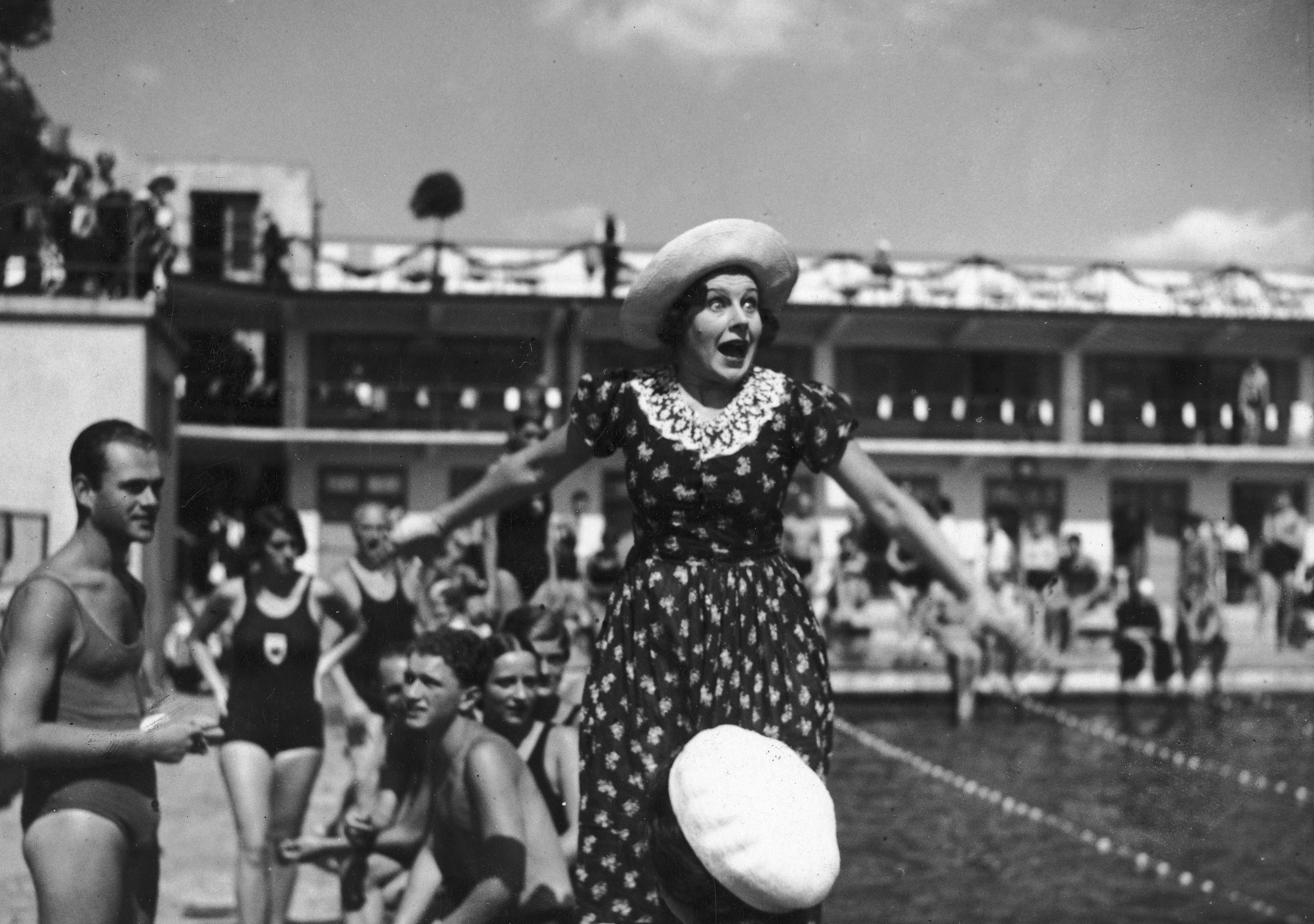
- Directed by: Michał Waszyński
- Written by: Adolf Dymsza, Konrad Tom
- Release date: 11 November 1932
- Country: Poland
- Language: Polish

Sto metrów miłości (One Hundred Metres of Love) is a 1932 Polish film directed by Michał Waszyński.

== Cast ==
- Zula Pogorzelska ... Zośka
- Adolf Dymsza ... Dodek
- Konrad Tom ... Moniek vel Mieszek Oszczep-Sardinenfis
- Ludwik Lawiński ... Rybkes
- Dora Kalinówna ... Dora, Rybkes' sister
- Krystyna Ankwicz ... Lili
- Mieczysław Cybulski ... Jan Leski
- Franciszek Petersile ... Janusz Pedałowicz
- Jerzy Kobusz
- Antoni Rózycki
- Stefania Betcherowa
- Eugeniusz Koszutski
- Marian Rentgen
