= The Citadel of Warsaw =

The Citadel of Warsaw may refer to:

- The Citadel of Warsaw (1930 film), German film
- The Citadel of Warsaw (1937 film), German film
