= Profesor Wilczur =

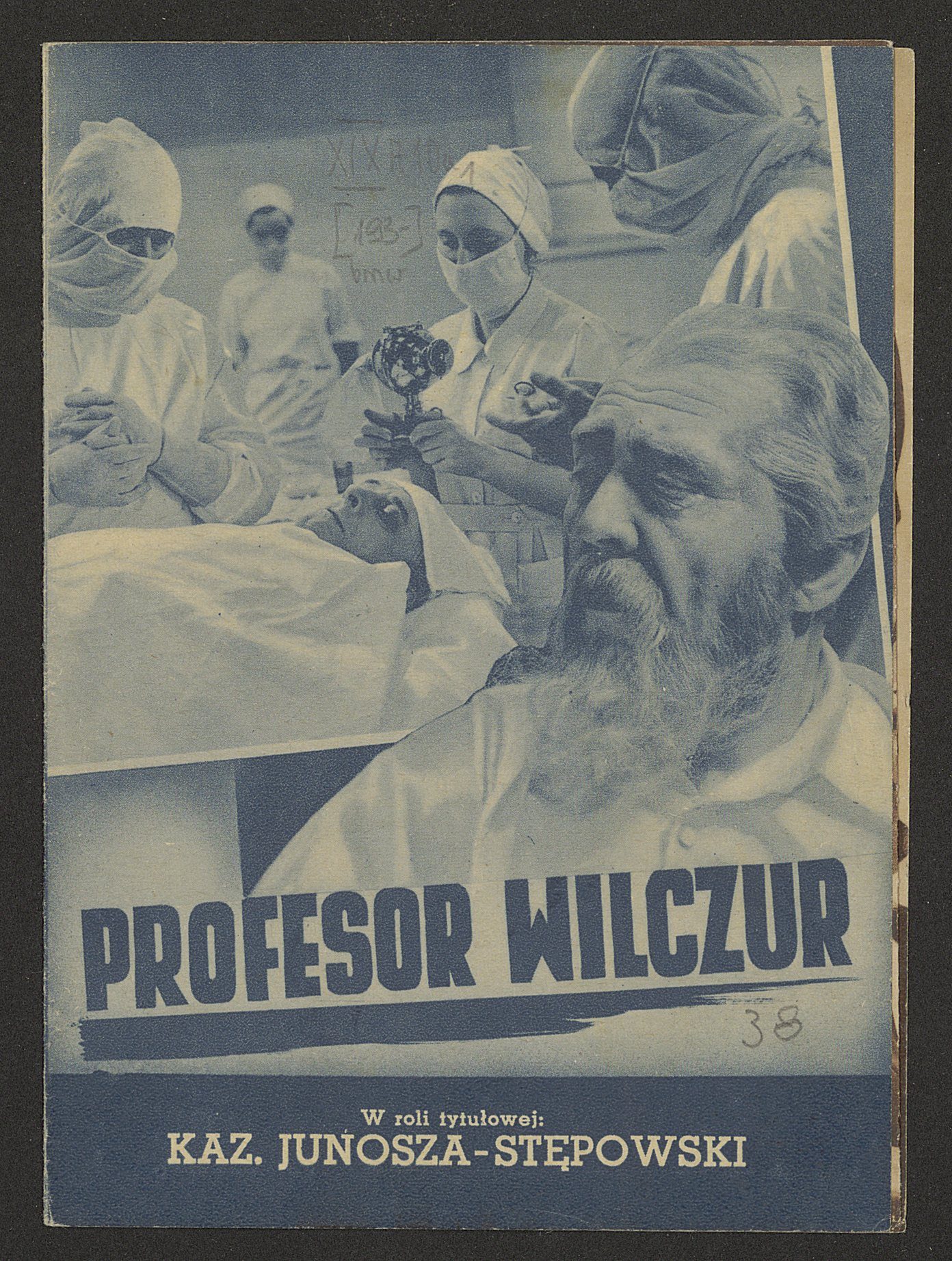
- Directed by: Michał Waszyński
- Written by: Tadeusz Dołęga-Mostowicz (novel), Anatol Stern (writer)
- Release date: 18 October 1938
- Running time: 88 minutes
- Country: Poland
- Language: Polish

Profesor Wilczur is a 1938 Polish romantic drama film directed by Michał Waszyński, a sequel to Znachor (1937). It is based on the novel Znachor by Tadeusz Dołęga-Mostowicz.

== Cast ==
- Kazimierz Junosza-Stępowski ... Prof. Rafal Wilczur
- Jacek Woszczerowicz ... Jemiol
- Elżbieta Barszczewska ... Marysia Wilczurówna / Czynska
- Witold Zacharewicz ... Leszek Czynski
- Dobieslaw Damiecki ... Juliusz Dembicz
- Józef Węgrzyn ... Dr. Stefan Dobraniecki
- Pelagia Relewicz-Ziembinska ... Lila Dobraniecka
- Mieczysława Ćwiklińska ... Florentyna Szkopkowa
- Marysia R. ... Elza Czynska (as Three-Year-Old Marysia R.)
- Henryk Modrzewski ... Dembicz's Manager
- Wlodzimierz Lozinski ... Wasyl Prokop
- Wanda Jakubinska ... Sick Boy's Mother
- Tekla Trapszo ... Dr. Zygmunt's Mother
- Mieczyslaw Winkler ... Wilczur's Servant Ludwik
- Paweł Owerłło ... Minister Dolant
