= Ułani, ułani, chłopcy malowani =

1932 film

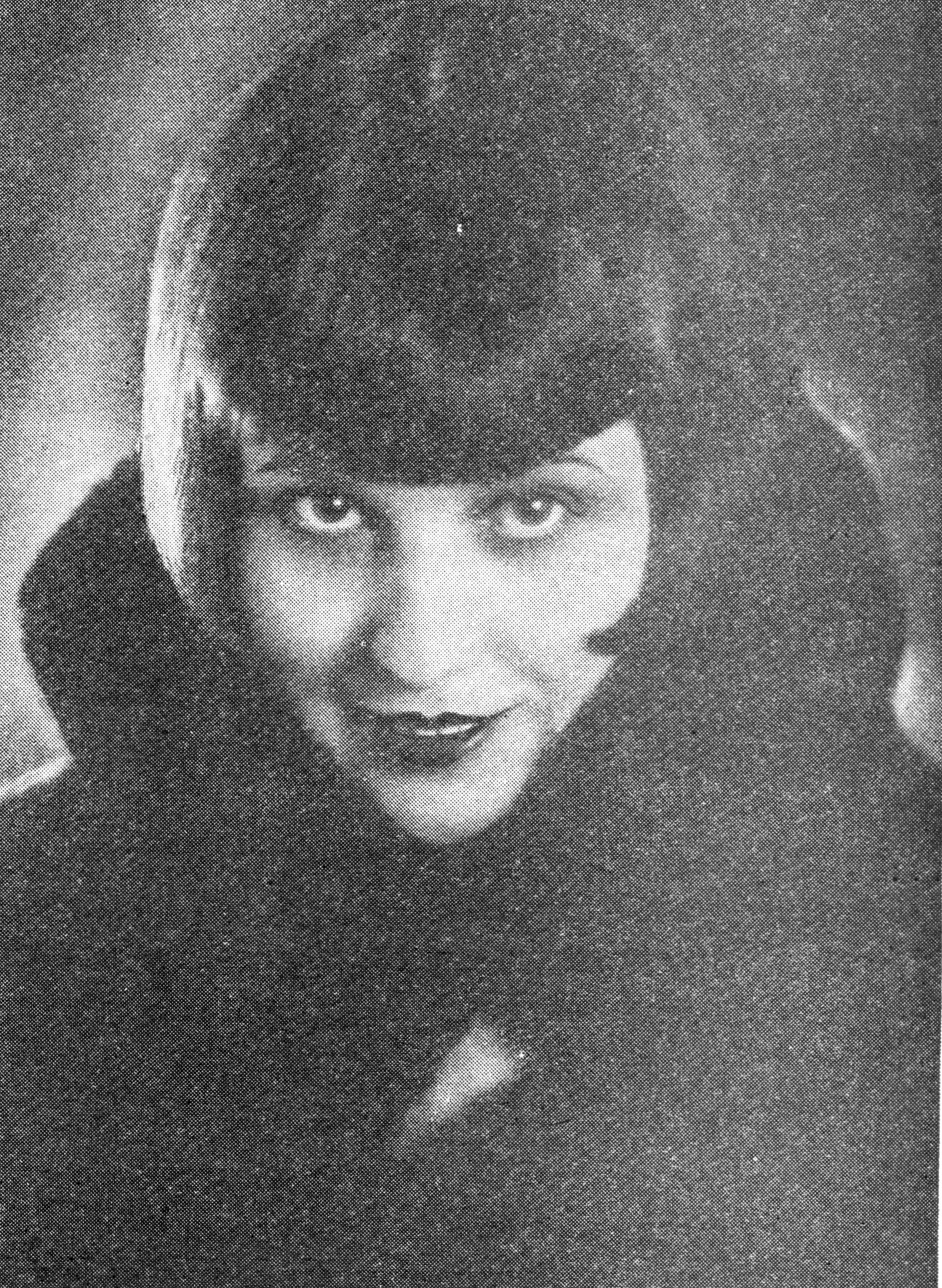
- Zula Pogorzelska (promotional photograph) performed as Helka, the beautiful maid
- Directed by: Mieczysław Krawicz
- Screenplay by: Ferdynand Goetel, Bolesław Wieniawa-Długoszowski
- Cinematography: Zbigniew Gniazdowski
- Music by: Władysław Daniłowski
- Release date: 1932
- Country: Poland
- Language: Polish

Ułani, ułani, chłopcy malowani (English: Uhlans, Ulhans, the Painted Boys) is a 1932 Polish military comedy film directed by Mieczysław Krawicz and produced by the Blok-Muzafilm studio with the participation of the 1st Light Cavalry Regiment. The film has been taken down by state censorship in 1938, allegedly for ridiculing the Polish Armed Forces. Not surprisingly, it has also been described as "one of the stupidest 'army farce' comedies in the twenty years between wars" (by Małgorzata Hendrykowska).

The film tells a story of two muffs posing as Uhlans to win the heart of a maid Helka, considered the prettiest of all girls in Grajdołek (a nominal name for boondocks in Polish). She catches them assuming to be thieves and brings them to the regiment, which is useless, because they originate from there.

== Cast ==
- Kazimierz Krukowski (Lopek)
- Adolf Dymsza (Felek)
- Zula Pogorzelska (Helka)
- Mieczysław Frenkiel (mayor of Grajdołek town)
- Maria Chaveau (mayor's wife)
- Władysław Lenczewski (colonel, commander of the Uhlans)
- Tadeusz Wesołowski (adjutant Lieutenant)
- Władysław Walter (sergeant)
- Czesław Skonieczny (Butcher)
- Ryszard Misiewicz (Kogutek, municipal secretary)
- Stefania Betcherowa (Butcher's wife)
