= Stefan Jaracz =

Polish actor (1883–1945)

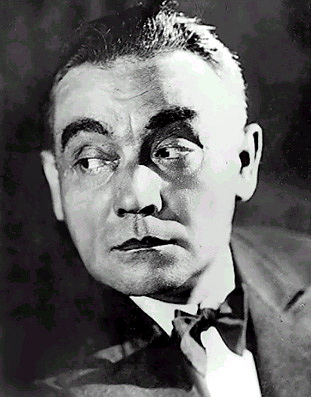
- Stefan Jaracz in the 1930s
- Born: 24 December 1883; Stare Żukowice, Poland
- Died: 11 August 1945 (aged 61); Otwock, Poland
- Known for: Dramatic theatre

Stefan Jaracz (24 December 1883 – 11 August 1945) was a Polish actor and theater producer. He served as the artistic director of Ateneum Theatre in Warsaw during the interwar period (1930–32), and within a short period raised its reputation as one of the leading voices for Poland's new intelligentsia, with groundbreaking productions of Danton's Death by Georg Büchner (1931), The Captain of Köpenick by Carl Zuckmayer (1932), as well as popular Ladies and Husars (Damy i Huzary) by Aleksander Fredro (1932) and The Open House by Michał Bałucki.

== Life ==
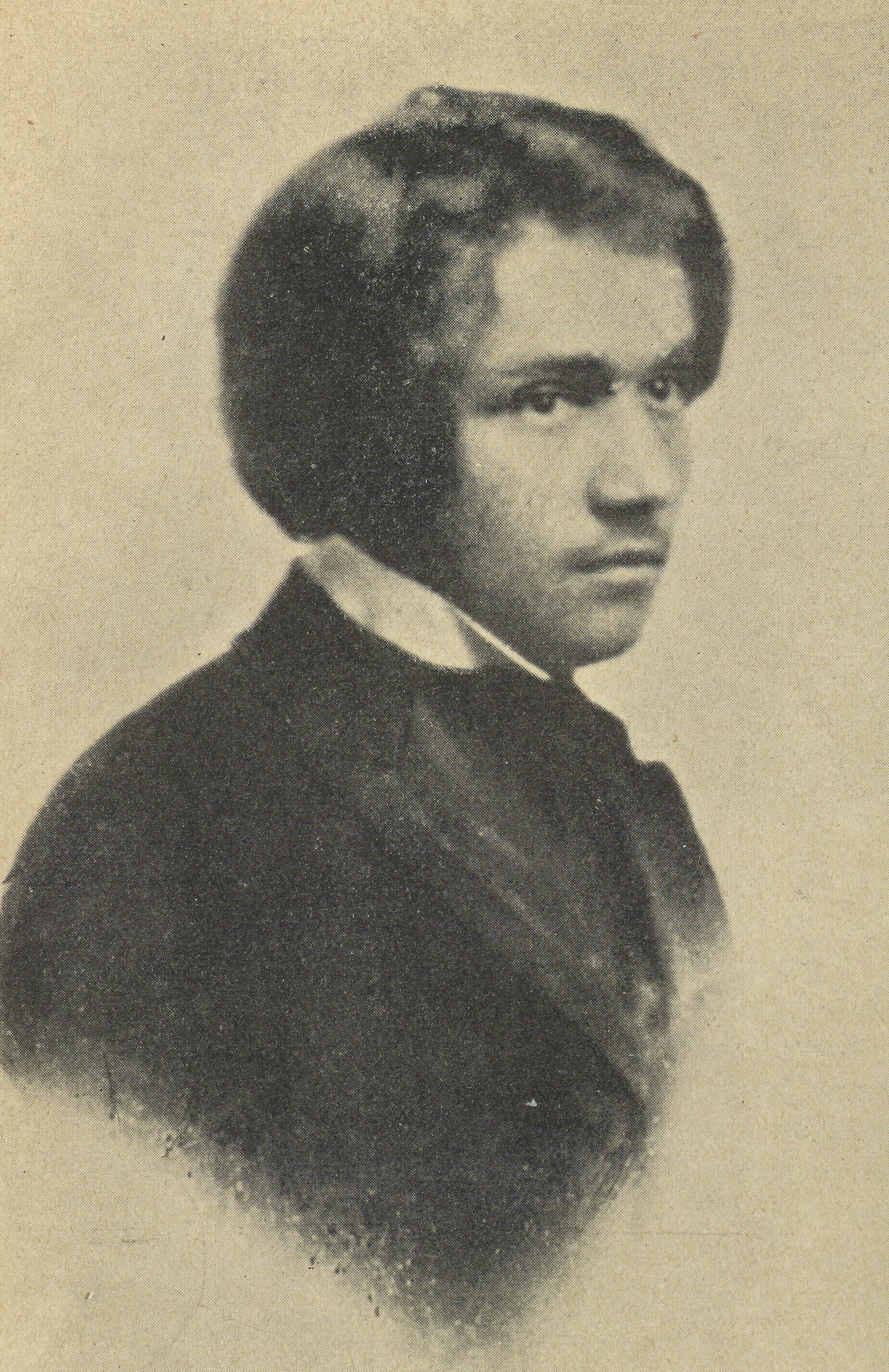
Stefan Jaracz in 1903

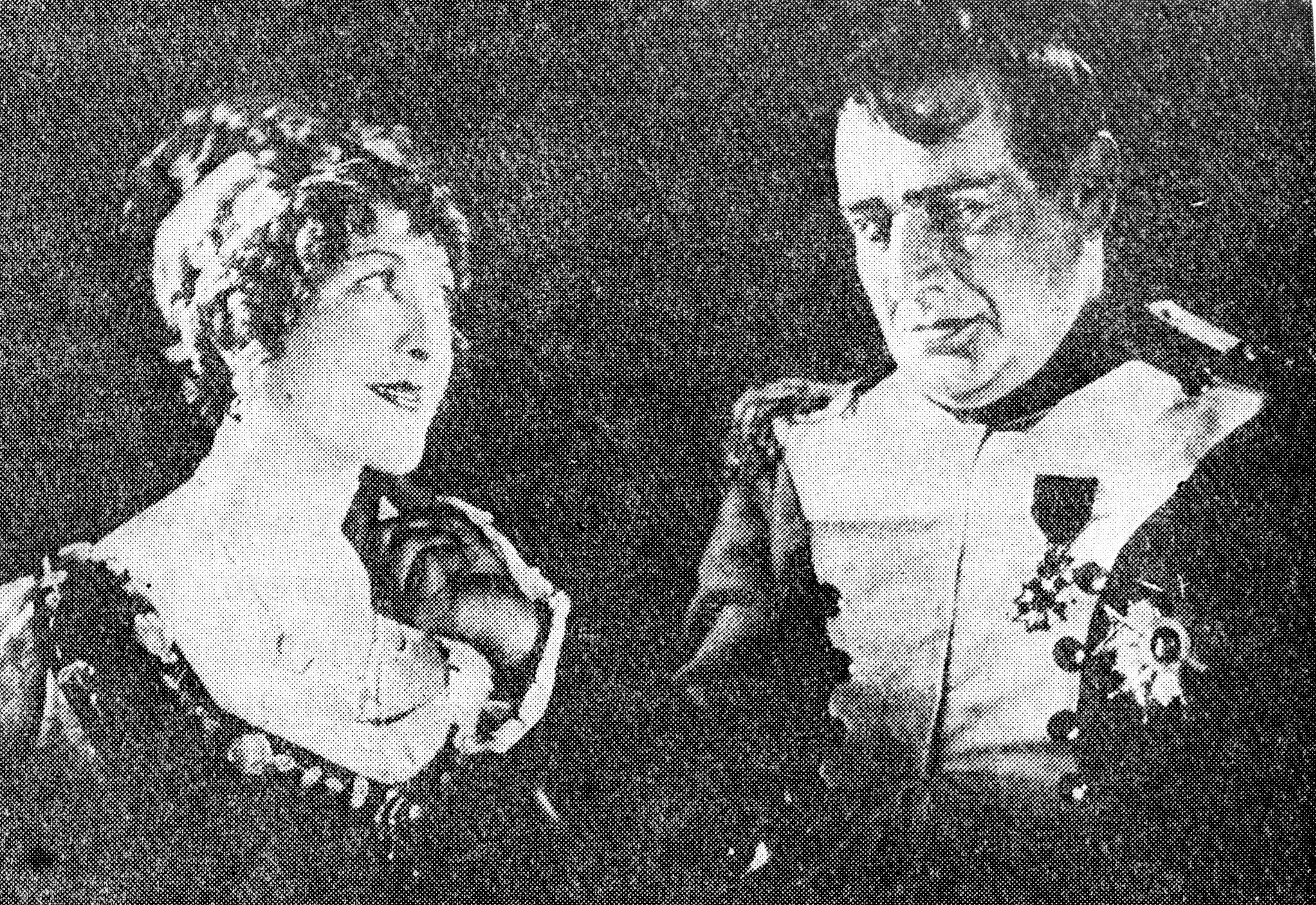
Mira Zimińska and Stefan Jaracz in 1935

Jaracz was born in Stare Żukowice near Tarnów during the Partitions of Poland. He studied law, history of art, and literature at the Jagiellonian University of Kraków, but gave up his studies to join theatre. He moved to Poznań for yet another contract, where he was drafted to the Austrian army in 1907. A year later he settled in Łódź where he performed until 1911. He moved to Warsaw in the Russian Partition and worked in Teatr Mały and Teatr Polski (1913). He was sent to Moscow by the Russians (1915). Upon his return to sovereign Poland in 1918 he embarked upon an energetic career in emerging national and experimental theatre, with guest performances in over ninety cities and towns until 1928. In 1930, he took over the Ateneum of Warsaw. He managed it until the Nazi-Soviet invasion of Poland, sharing the responsibilities with Leon Schiller in 1932–33 season.

Following the German occupation of Poland during World War II, he became involved with the political and military Catholic underground organization Unia. After the assassination of actor and collaborator Igo Sym in March 1941 by order of the Polish Underground State, Jaracz, along with Leon Schiller and a number of other actors and filmmakers were arrested in acts of reprisals. He was imprisoned in Warsaw's Pawiak prison in March 1941. On 5 April 1941, he was deported to the German concentration camp Auschwitz-Birkenau. Jaracz was released after numerous interventions on 15 May 1941. He died in Otwock, near Warsaw in 1945 of tuberculosis. The repertory Stefan Jaracz Theatre in Łódź, Poland is named after him, and so is the Ateneum Theatre in Warsaw since 1951.

== Acting technique ==
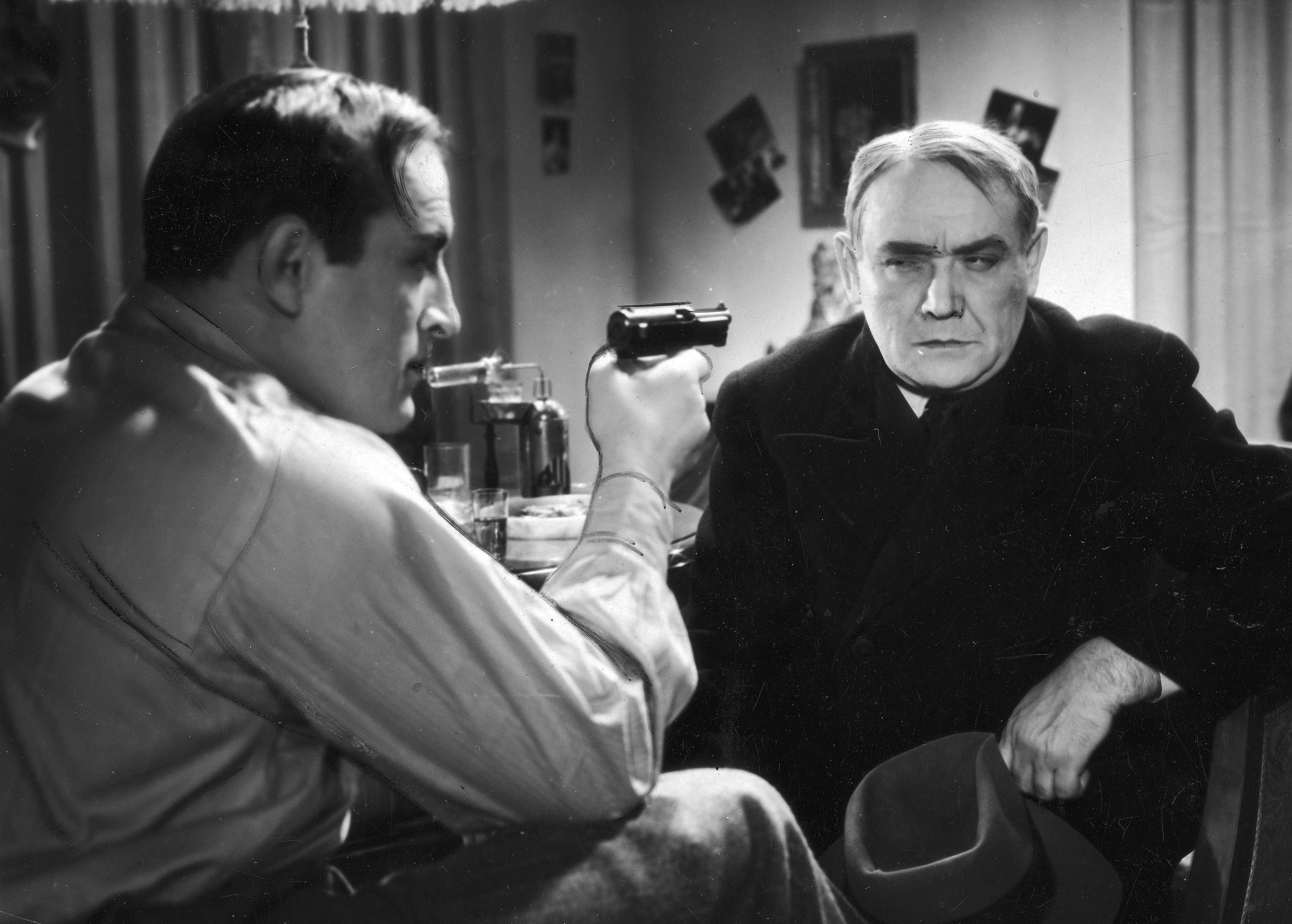
Tadeusz Olsza (left) and Stefan Jaracz playing Konstanty Kurczek in 1936 film Jego wielka miłość (His one great love)

Jaracz was endowed with a heavy, angular figure and a hoarse yet highly evocative voice. He earned the fame of the most perfect actor of roles of the disadvantaged and the humiliated. He approached them without sentimentality, conveying bitterness and coarseness as well as rebellion, even if they were deeply hidden. With his acting understated and free from affectation, he was able to create characters who were profoundly human, moving and simple. Jaracz was considered to bring to the theater a somewhat plebeian flavor that added verity to his roles. Sometimes he played bluntly, although over time his acting became more detached and would at times reveal a hint of mockery. Nevertheless, he was regarded as an actor who empathized with, respected and defended his protagonists, and who conveyed their suffering. He worked hard on his roles, polishing them and sometimes introducing major changes to stagings in other theaters.

== Partial filmography ==
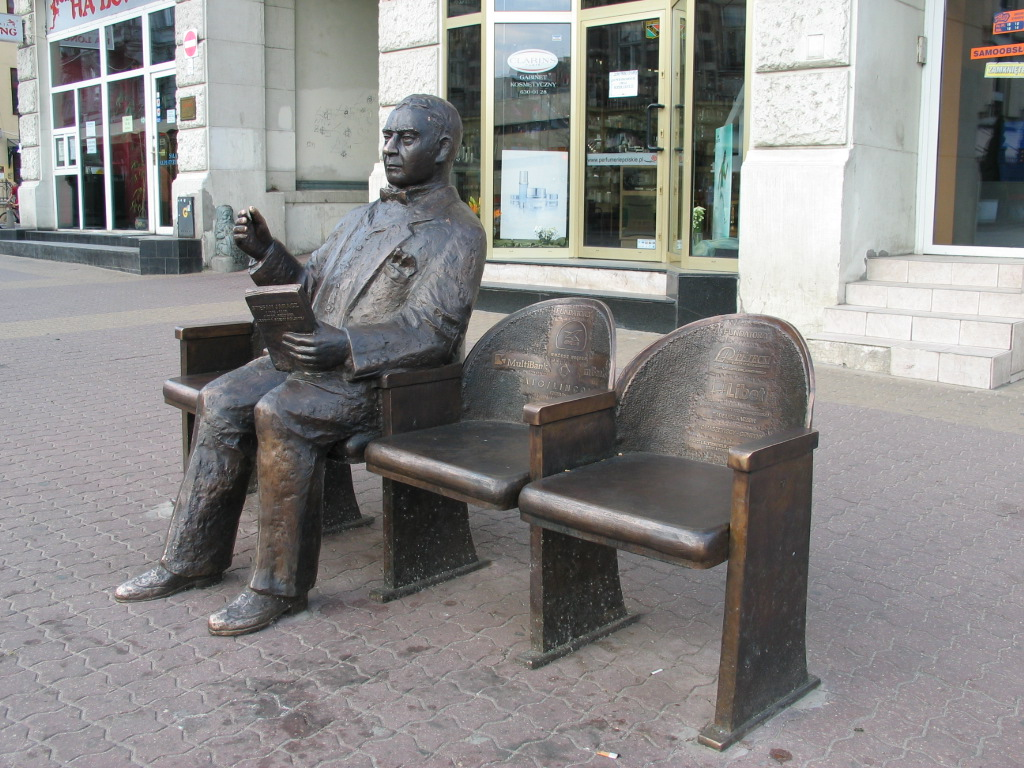
Statue of Stefan Jaracz in Łódź, Poland

- Wykolejeni (1913) - Bankier
- Obrona Częstochowy (1913) - Michal Wolodyjowski
- Countess Walewska (1914) - Napoleon Bonaparte
- Cud nad Wisla (1921) - Jan Rudy
- Za winy brata (1921) - Karol Gromski
- Niewolnica milosci (1923)
- Skrzydlaty zwyciezca (1924)
- The Unspeakable (1924) - rada Wolski
- Milosc za zycie. Symfonia ludzkosci (1924)
- Iwonka (1925) - Gabriel's Friend
- Pan Tadeusz (1928) - Napoleon Bonaparte
- Przedwiosnie (1928) - Seweryn Baryka
- Ponad snieg (1929) - Joachim
- The Beauty of Life (1930) - Rozlucki, Piotr's father
- Bezimienni bohaterowie (1932)
- Księżna Łowicka (1932) - Grand Duke Constantine Pawlowicz
- Biala trucizna (1932) - Jan Kanski
- Przebudzenie (1934) - Drunk
- Młody Las (1934) - Professor Kiernicki
- Milosc maturzystki (1935) - Drunk
- Pan Twardowski (1936) - Master Maciej, Alchemist
- Jego wielka milosc (1936) - Konstanty Kruczek
- Róża (1936) - Oset (final film role)

== See also ==
- Polish culture in the Interbellum
- List of theatre directors.
- List of Poles
