= Kobiety nad przepaścią =

- Directed by: Emil Chaberski and Michał Waszyński.
- Written by: Antoni Marczyński (novel), Anatol Stern (writer)
- Starring: Maria Bogda, Adam Brodzisz
- Music by: Henryk Wars
- Release date: March 15, 1938
- Running time: 74 minutes
- Country: Poland
- Language: Polish

Kobiety nad przepaścią is a 1938 Polish drama film directed by Emil Chaberski and Michał Waszyński.

== Cast ==
- Maria Bogda ... Marysia Zurkówna
- Nora Ney ... Lola Ventana
- Jadwiga Andrzejewska... Iza
- Adam Brodzisz ... Walek
- Tamara Wiszniewska ... Róża
- Elżbieta Kryńska ... Pola
- Nina Świerczewska ... Franka Zurkówna
- Kazimierz Junosza-Stępowski ... Wolak
- Stanisław Sielański ... Stas
- Bogusław Samborski ... Müller
- Aleksander Żabczyński ... Klug
- Tadeusz Wesołowski ... Dance Instructor
- Hanna Parysiewicz ... Elwira
- Aldona Jasińska ... Landlady
- Stefan Hnydziński... Kuba
