= Każdemu wolno kochać =

1933 Polish film

- Directed by: Mieczysław Krawicz
- Screenplay by: T. Kotwicz; Julian Krzewinski; Mariusz Maszynski
- Starring: Ludwik Lawiński; Janina Brochwiczówna; Józef Kondrat
- Cinematography: Zbigniew Gniazdowski
- Music by: Zygmunt Karasinski; Szymon Kataszek
- Production company: Blok-Muzafilm
- Release date: 1933
- Running time: 80 minutes
- Country: Poland
- Language: Polish

Każdemu wolno kochać (Anybody Can Love) is a 1933 Polish romantic comedy film directed by Mieczysław Krawicz and produced by the Rex-Film studio.

== Cast ==
- Ludwik Lawiński as theatre director
- Stanisława Kawińska as Weronika
- Janina Brochwiczówna as starlet of the revue
- Józef Kondrat as audience member
- Henryk Małkowski as janitor
- Ludwik Fritsche as Professor Robaczek
- Mariusz Maszyński as Alojzy Kędziorek
- Liliana Zielińska as Renia
- Feliks Chmurkowski as guest at Renata's
- Czesław Skonieczny as Maciej Baleron
- Mira Zimińska as Lodzia
- Józef Orwid as landlord of the apartment block
- Adolf Dymsza as Hipek
- Witold Conti as star of the revue
- Stanisław Łapiński as Mayor
