= Bogusław Samborski =

Polish actor

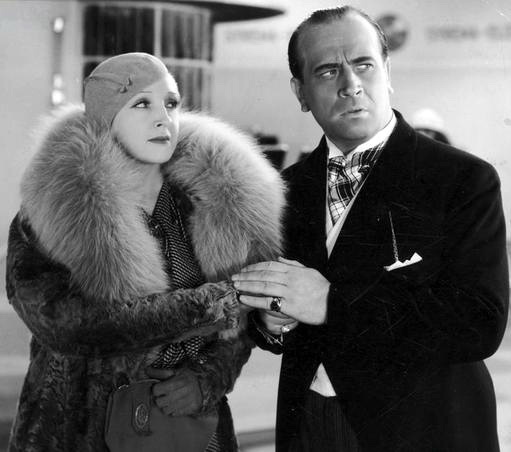
- Born: 14 April 1897; Warsaw, Poland, Russian Empire (now Warsaw, Poland)
- Died: 1971 (aged 73–74); Argentina
- Occupation: Actor
- Years active: 1925-1947

Bogusław Samborski (14 April 1897 – 1971) was a Polish film actor. He appeared in more than 25 films between 1925 and 1947.

After the outbreak of World War II, he initially ran a cafe at the Polish Theater, closed after taking over the building for the occupation "Theater der Stadt Warschau" (1940). Director of this institution, Igo Sym convinced Samborski to perform in public theaters and play a role in the anti-Polish film Heimkehr. It is probable that Samborski decided to cooperate with him to protect his wife, who was of Jewish descent.

After Igo Sym was executed by the Polish Underground State in 1941, Samborski went to Nazi Germany, where he remained after the war. There, he continued his acting career under the pseudonym Gottlieb Sambor. In 1947, Samborski was sentenced to life in prison in absentia for collaborating with the Germans, after which he fled to Argentina.

== Selected filmography ==
- Police Chief Tagiejew (1929)
- The Beauty of Life (1930)
- Exile to Siberia (1930)
- Niebezpieczny romans (1930)
- The Ten from Pawiak Prison (1931)
- Prokurator Alicja Horn (1933)
- The Story of Sin (1933)
- Młody Las (1934)
- Róża (1936)
- Pan Twardowski (1936)
- Kobiety nad przepaścią (1938)
- The Line (1938)
- Gehenna (1938)
- Krystyna's Lie (1939)
- Heimkehr (1941)
- Shiva und die Galgenblume (1945)
