= Maria Bogda =

Polish actress (1909–1981)

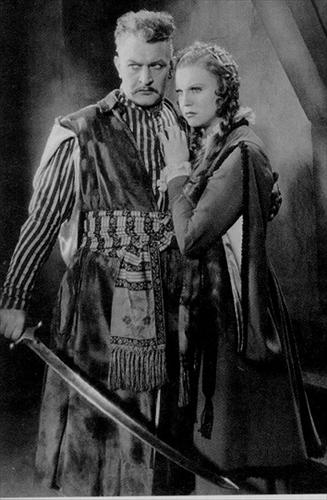
- Maria Bogda and Franciszek Brodniewicz in Pan Twardowski (1936)
- Born: Janina Kopaczek; 25 November 1909; Lemberg, Austria-Hungary
- Died: 30 June 1981 (aged 71); Desert Hot Springs, California, USA
- Occupation: actress
- Spouse: Adam Brodzisz

Maria Bogda (25 November 1909–30 June 1981) was a Polish actress.

== Selected filmography ==
- Police Chief Tagiejew (1929)
- Pod banderą miłości (1929)
- Głos pustyni (1932)
- Bezimienni bohaterowie (1932)
- Córka generała Pankratowa (1934)
- Młody las (1934)
- ABC miłości (1935)
- Antek policmajster (1935)
- Rapsodia Bałtyku (1935)
- Pan Twardowski (1936)
- Kobiety nad przepaścią (1938)
