= Pan Twardowski (1936 film) =

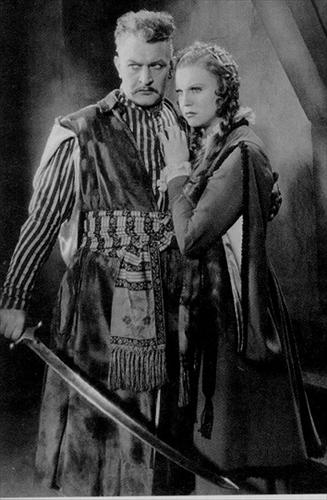
- A scene from the film.
- Directed by: Henryk Szaro
- Written by: Wacław Gąsiorowski; Anatol Stern
- Starring: Franciszek Brodniewicz; Kazimierz Junosza-Stępowski; Maria Bogda; Elżbieta Barszczewska
- Cinematography: Seweryn Steinwurzel
- Music by: Jan Maklakiewicz
- Production company: Ultra Film
- Release date: 27 February 1936
- Running time: 85 minutes
- Country: Poland
- Language: Polish

Pan Twardowski is a 1936 Polish fantasy film directed by Henryk Szaro and starring Franciszek Brodniewicz, Kazimierz Junosza-Stępowski and Maria Bogda. It is one of many films based on the legend of Pan Twardowski who makes a Faustian pact to win the love of a woman.

== Main cast ==
- Franciszek Brodniewicz as Pan Twardowski
- Kazimierz Junosza-Stępowski as Satan
- Maria Bogda as Kasia
- Elżbieta Barszczewska as Neta / Pani Twardowska
- Mieczysława Ćwiklińska as Neta's Aunt
- Maria Malicka as Twardowski's Mother
- Zofia Lindorf as Queen Barbara Radziwiłłówna
- Józef Węgrzyn as King Zygmunt II August
- Jan Kurnakowicz as Maciek
- Stefan Jaracz as Master Maciej, Alchemist
- Bogusław Samborski as Neta's Fiancé
- Stanisław Sielański as Servant
- Tadeusz Wesołowski as Man in Court
- Michał Znicz as Judge
- Loda Niemirzanka as Wedding Guest (uncredited)

== Bibliography ==
- Skaff, Sheila. The Law of the Looking Glass: Cinema in Poland, 1896–1939. Ohio University Press, 2008.
