= Marian Rentgen =

Polish actor

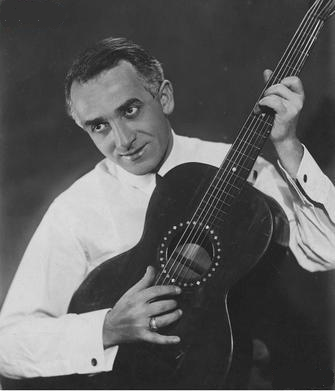
- Born: Marian Antoni Güntner; 23 June 1888; Bochnia, Austria-Hungary
- Died: spring 1940; Katyn, Soviet Union
- Years active: 1913–1939

Marian Rentgen (born Marian Antoni Güntner; 23 June 1888 – spring 1940) was a Polish actor, singer, also pharmacist and soldier. Graduated in pharmacy in 1913 at the University of Lemberg. He was active in theatre and film between 1913 and 1938. He was killed in the Katyn massacre of 1940.

== Selected filmography ==
- Sto metrów miłości (1932)
- Jego ekscelencja subiekt (1933)
