= Tekla Trapszo =

Polish actress (1873–1944)

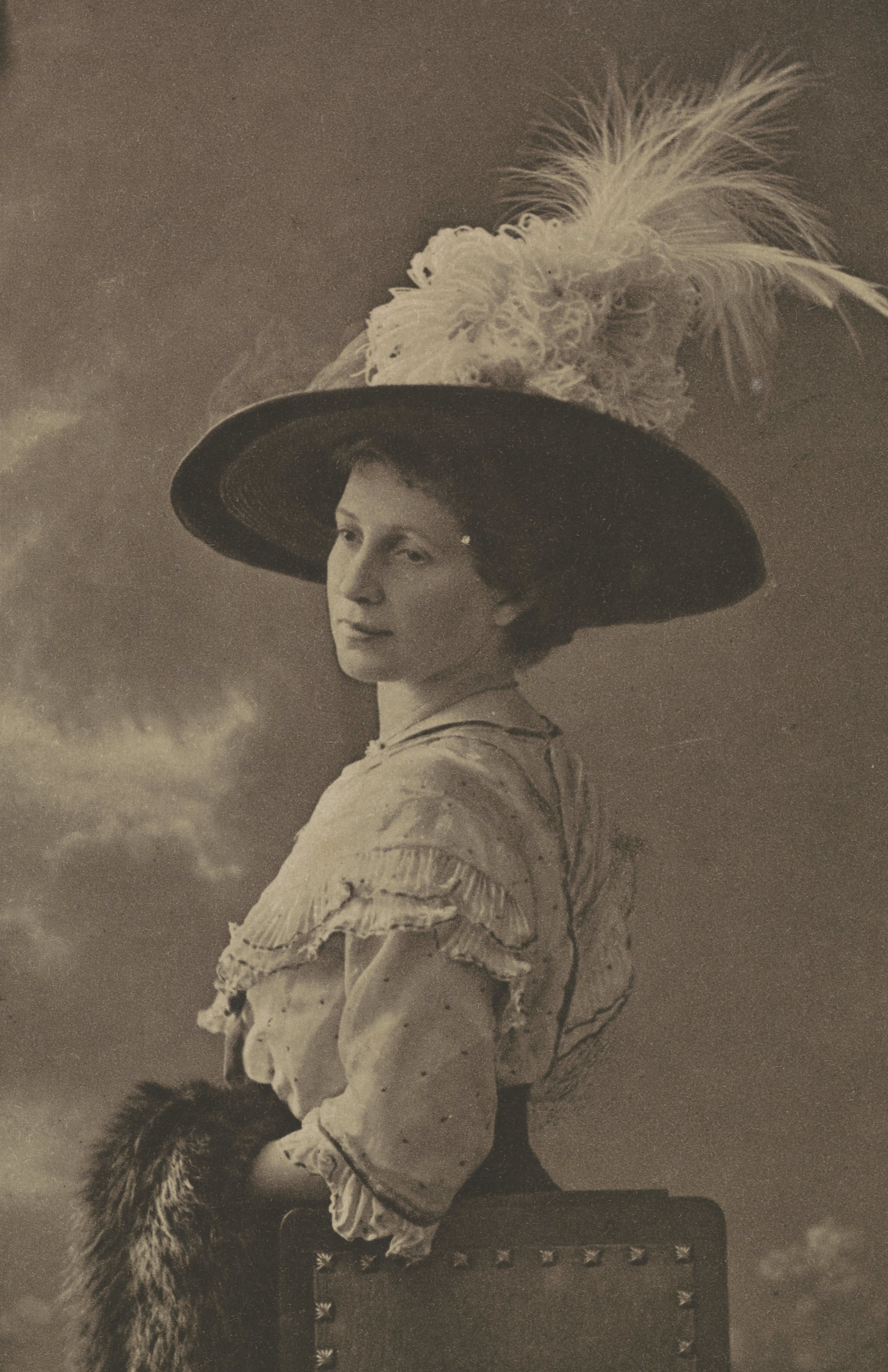
- Born: 23 September 1873; Kalisz, Poland, Russian Empire (now Kalisz, Poland)
- Died: 27 October 1944 (aged 71); Warsaw, Poland
- Occupation: Actress
- Years active: 1911-1939

Tekla Trapszo (23 September 1873 – 27 October 1944) was a Polish stage and film actress. She appeared in 20 films between 1911 and 1939.

== Selected filmography ==
- Pod banderą miłości (1929)
- Rena (1938)
- Młody Las (1934)
- Profesor Wilczur (1938)
