= Rapsodia Bałtyku =

- Directed by: Leonard Buczkowski
- Written by: Konrad Tom
- Music by: Tadeusz Górzyński
- Release date: 25 October 1935 (Poland)
- Running time: 82 minutes
- Country: Poland
- Language: Polish

Rapsodia Bałtyku (English: Baltic Rhapsody) is a Polish melodrama film from 1935 directed by Leonard Buczkowski. It is the story about two friends, Adam and Zygmunt, serving in the floatplanes escadrille of the Polish Navy.

It is notable for an appearance of Polish destroyer ORP Wicher (actually the first modern warship ever built for the Polish Navy) and Lublin R-XIII floatplanes.

- Screenplay – Konrad Tom
- Dialogs – Jan Adolf Hertz
- Scenography – Jacek Rotmil, Stefan Norris
- Music – Tadeusz Górzyński
- Text of the songs – Jerzy Jurandot

== Cast ==
- Maria Bogda – Janka Zatorska
- Barbara Orwid – Ewa Zatorska
- Adam Brodzisz – Adam Halny
- Mieczysław Cybulski – Zygmunt Zatorski, Ewa's husband
- Jerzy Marr – Jerzy Jedyński
- Lala Górska – Jędruś Zatorski
- Stanisław Sielański – Przędza
- Paweł Owerłło – commander Zieliński
- Maria Kaupe – singer
- Monika Carlo – Franciszka
