= Basia Wywerkówna =

Polish actress

- Born: Poland

Basia Wywerkówna (born July 4, 1928, in Warsaw, died April 17, 2008) was a Polish child actress. In 1935 she starred in the film ABC miłości.
