= Pan Tadeusz (1928 film) =

1928 film

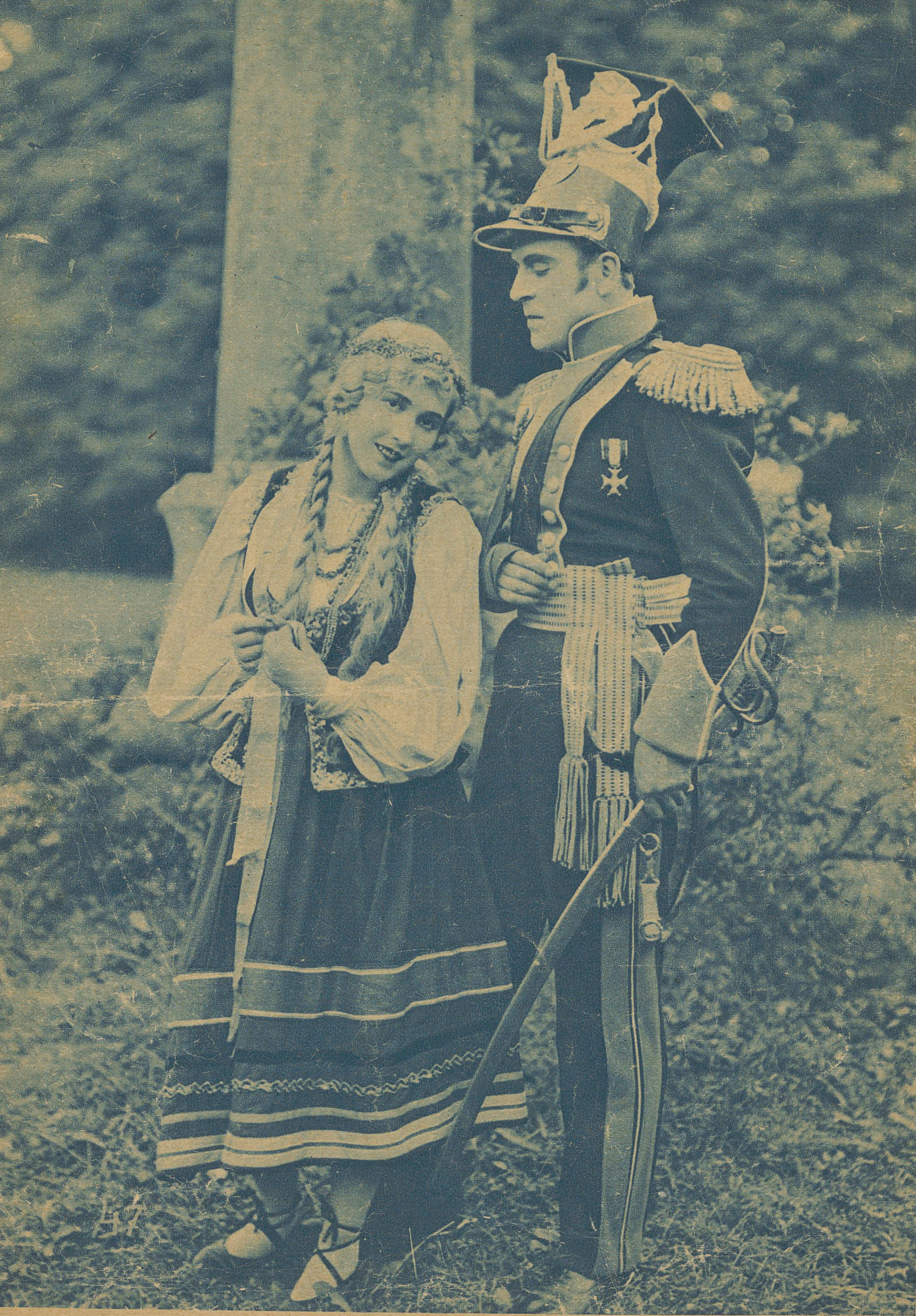
- Directed by: Ryszard Ordynski
- Written by: Ferdynand Goetel; Adam Mickiewicz; Andrzej Strug
- Cinematography: Janusz Wasung; Antoni Wawrzyniak
- Production company: Star-Film
- Release date: 9 November 1928
- Country: Poland

Pan Tadeusz (1928) by Ryszard Ordynski

Pan Tadeusz is a 1928 Polish historical film, based on Adam Mickiewicz's 1834 poem of the same name. The film was long considered lost, until the vast majority of it was found in 2006.

== Cast ==
- Wojciech Brydziński as Adam Mickiewicz
- Stanisław Knake-Zawadzki as Sędzia Soplica
- Jan Szymański - Jacek Soplica (priest Robak)
- Mariusz Maszyński as Hrabia Horeszko
- Leon Łuszczewski − Tadeusz Soplica
- Helena Sulimowa − Telimena
- Zofia Zajączkowska as Zosia Horeszkówna
- Paweł Owerłło as Podkomorzy
- Helena Górska-Brylinska as Podkomorzyna
- Rena Hryniewiczówna as Podkomorzanka
- Wiesław Gawlikowski as Wojski
- Janina Klimkiewiczowa as Wojszczanka
- Marian Jednowski as Gerwazy
- Ludwik Fritsche as Protazy
- Stefan Jaracz as Napoleon Bonaparte
- Jerzy Marr as Stanislaw Szczesny Potocki
- Henryk Rzętkowski as Sergeant Gonta
