= Adam Brodzisz =

Polish actor

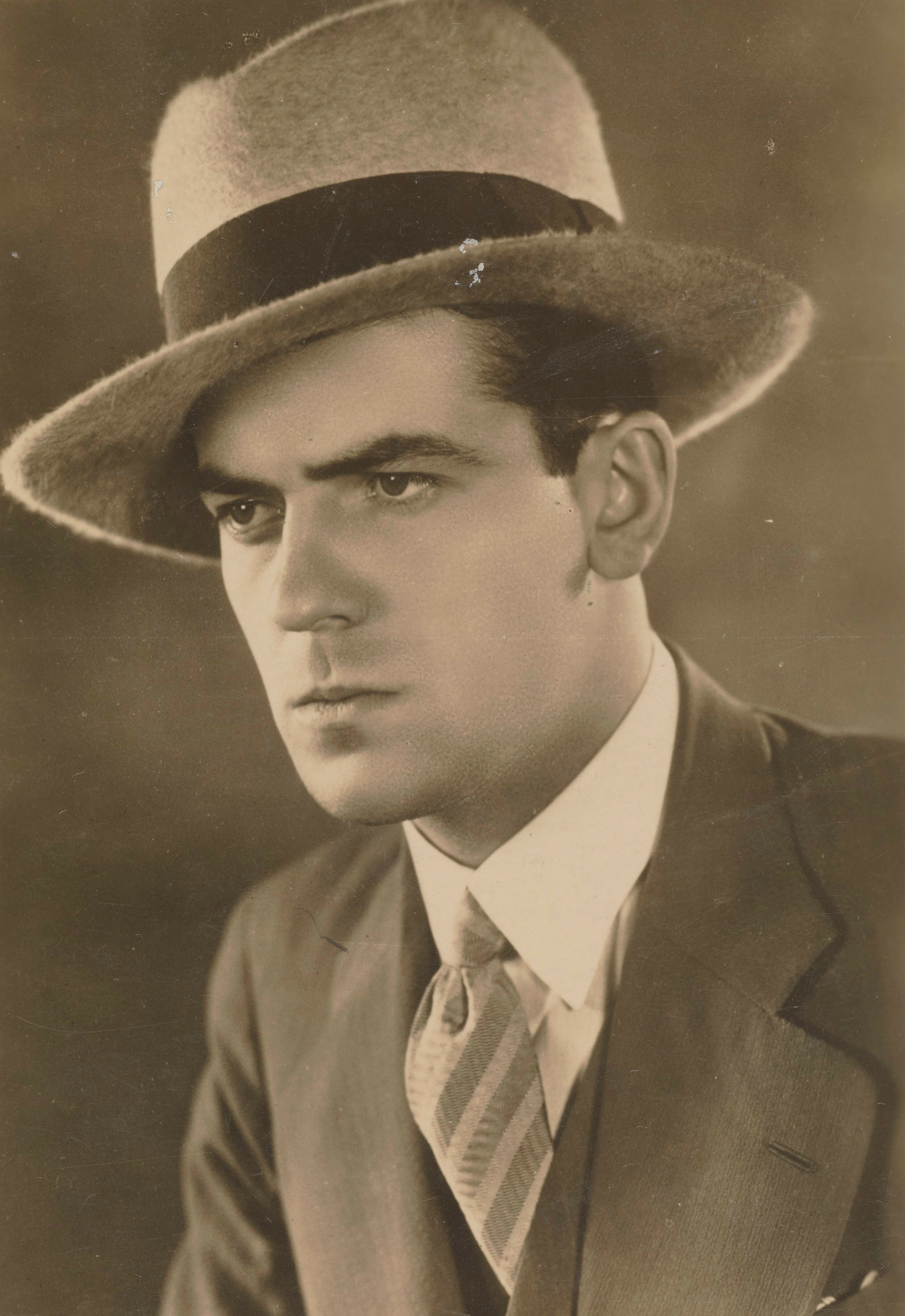
- Born: 18 February 1906; Lemberg, Austria-Hungary (now Lviv, Ukraine)
- Died: 9 November 1986 (aged 80); Desert Hot Springs, California, United States
- Occupation: Actor
- Years active: 1928-1955
- Spouse: Maria Bogda

Adam Brodzisz (18 February 1906 – 9 November 1986) was a Polish film actor. He appeared in 22 films between 1928 and 1955.

== Selected filmography ==
- Exile to Siberia (1930)
- The Beauty of Life (1930)
- The Citadel of Warsaw (1930)
- The Ten from Pawiak Prison (1931)
- Bezimienni bohaterowie (1932)
- Sound of the Desert (1932)
- Młody Las (1934)
- Rapsodia Bałtyku (1935)
- Bohaterowie Sybiru (1936)
- Kobiety nad przepaścią (1938)
- At the End of the Road (1939)
