= Jacek Woszczerowicz =

Polish actor (1904–1970)

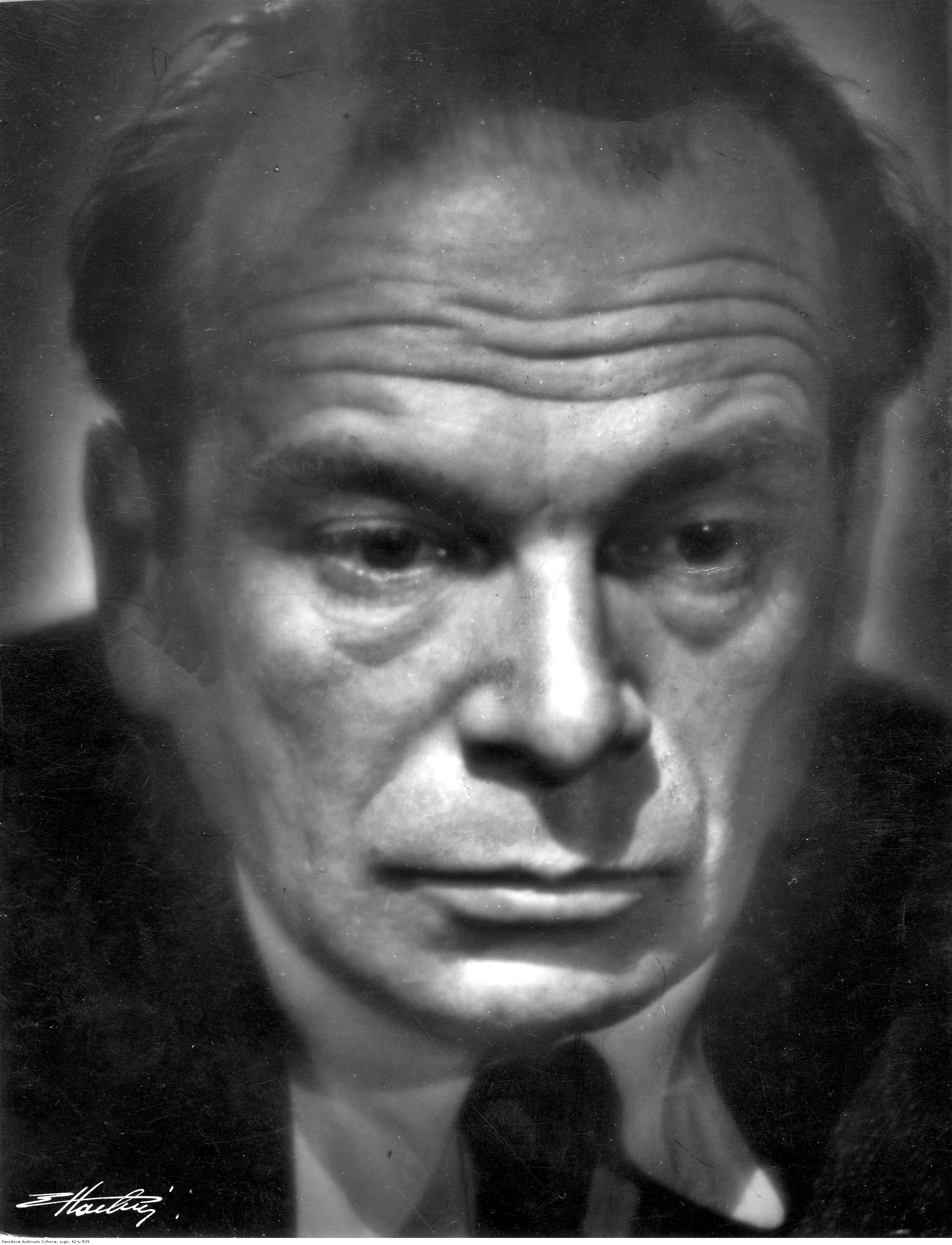
- Born: Marian Jacek Woszczerowicz; September 11, 1904; Siedlce, Congress Poland, Russian Empire
- Died: October 19, 1970 (aged 66); Warsaw, Poland
- Occupation: Actor
- Years active: 1936-1970
- Spouses: Luba Fischer; Halina Kossobudzka

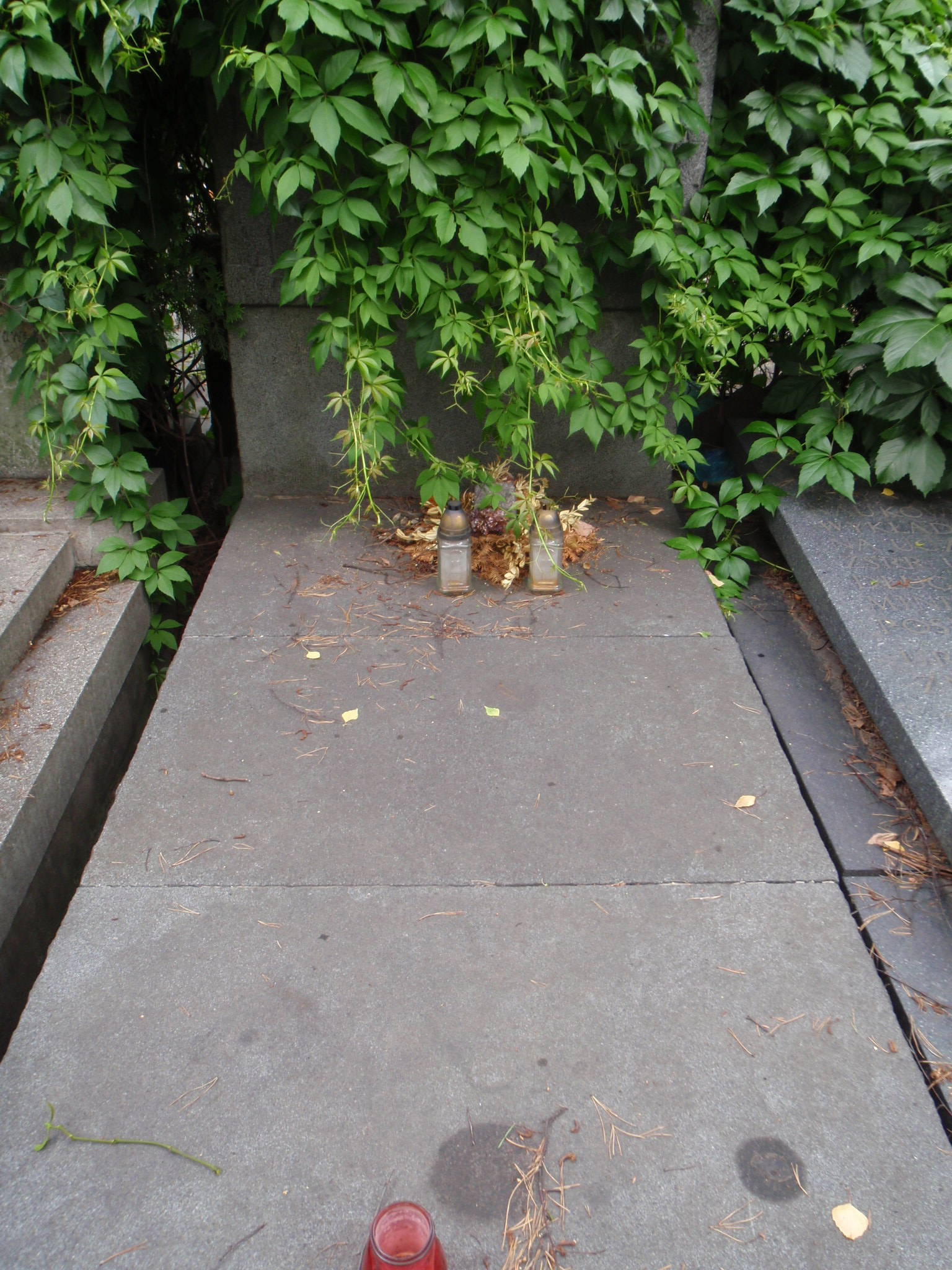
Woszczerowicza's grave

Marian Jacek Woszczerowicz (1904–1970) was a Polish actor.

== Selected filmography ==
- Znachor (1937)
- Rena (1938)
- Profesor Wilczur (1938)
- Krystyna's Lie (1939)
- Zemsta (1957)
