= Wojciech Brydziński =

Polish theatre, radio, and film actor

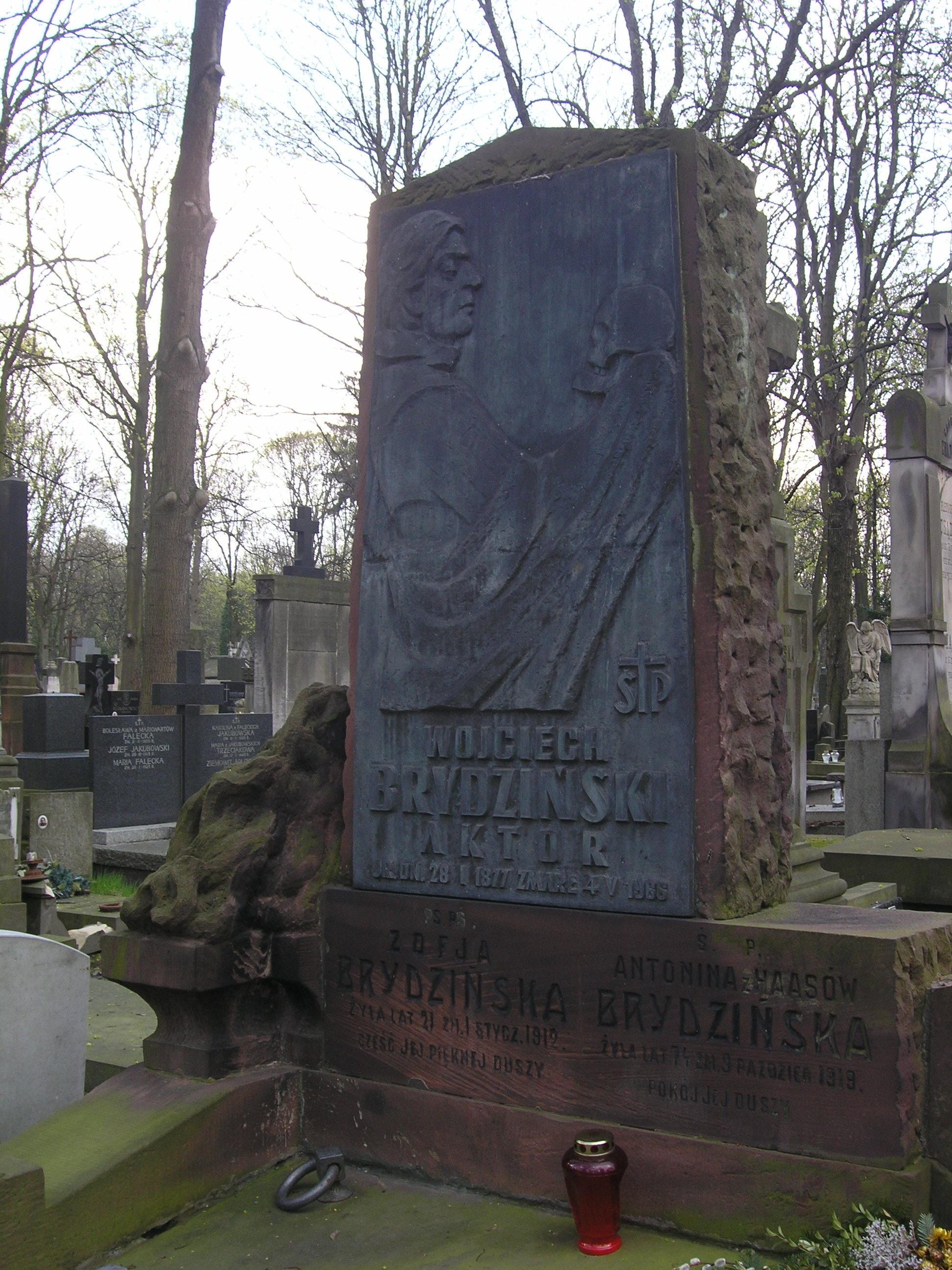
Brydziński's grave at Powązki Cemetery in Warsaw

Wojciech Brydziński (28 January 1877 in Ivano-Frankivsk – 4 May 1966 aged 89, in Warsaw) was a Polish theatre, radio and film actor.

== Selected filmography ==
- Slave of the Senses (1914)
- Pan Tadeusz (1928)
- Znachor (1937)
