= Paweł Owerłło =

Polish actor

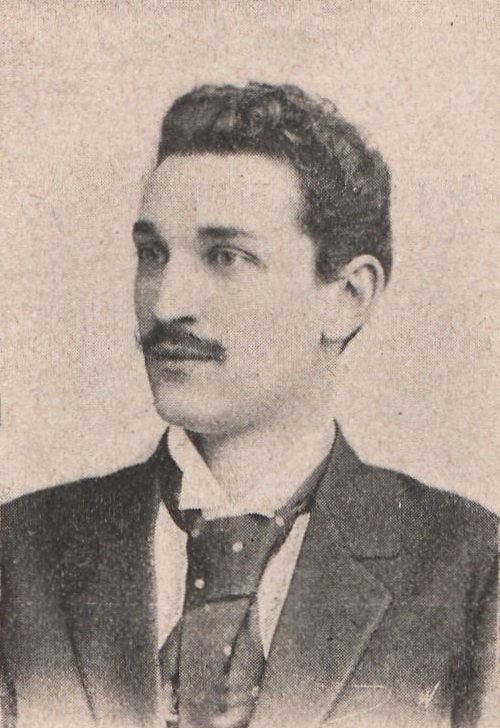
- Born: 15 September 1869; Warsaw, Poland, Russian Empire (now Warsaw, Poland)
- Died: 27 April 1957 (aged 87); Warsaw, Polish People's Republic
- Occupation: Actor
- Years active: 1912–1939

Paweł Owerłło (15 September 1869 – 27 April 1957) was a Polish stage and film actor. He appeared in more than 45 films between 1912 and 1939.

== Selected filmography ==
- The Unthinkable (1926)
- Pan Tadeusz (1928)
- Pod banderą miłości (1929)
- Kult ciała (1930)
- Niebezpieczny romans (1930)
- Bezimienni bohaterowie (1932)
- Sound of the Desert (1932)
- Prokurator Alicja Horn (1933)
- The Story of Sin (1933)
- Life Sentence (1933)
- Is Lucyna a Girl? (1934)
- Co mój mąż robi w nocy (1934)
- Młody Las (1934)
- Love, Cherish, Respect (1934)
- Rapsodia Bałtyku (1935)
- Second Youth (1938)
- Profesor Wilczur (1938)
- Krystyna's Lie (1939)
