= Ludwik Lawiński =

Polish actor

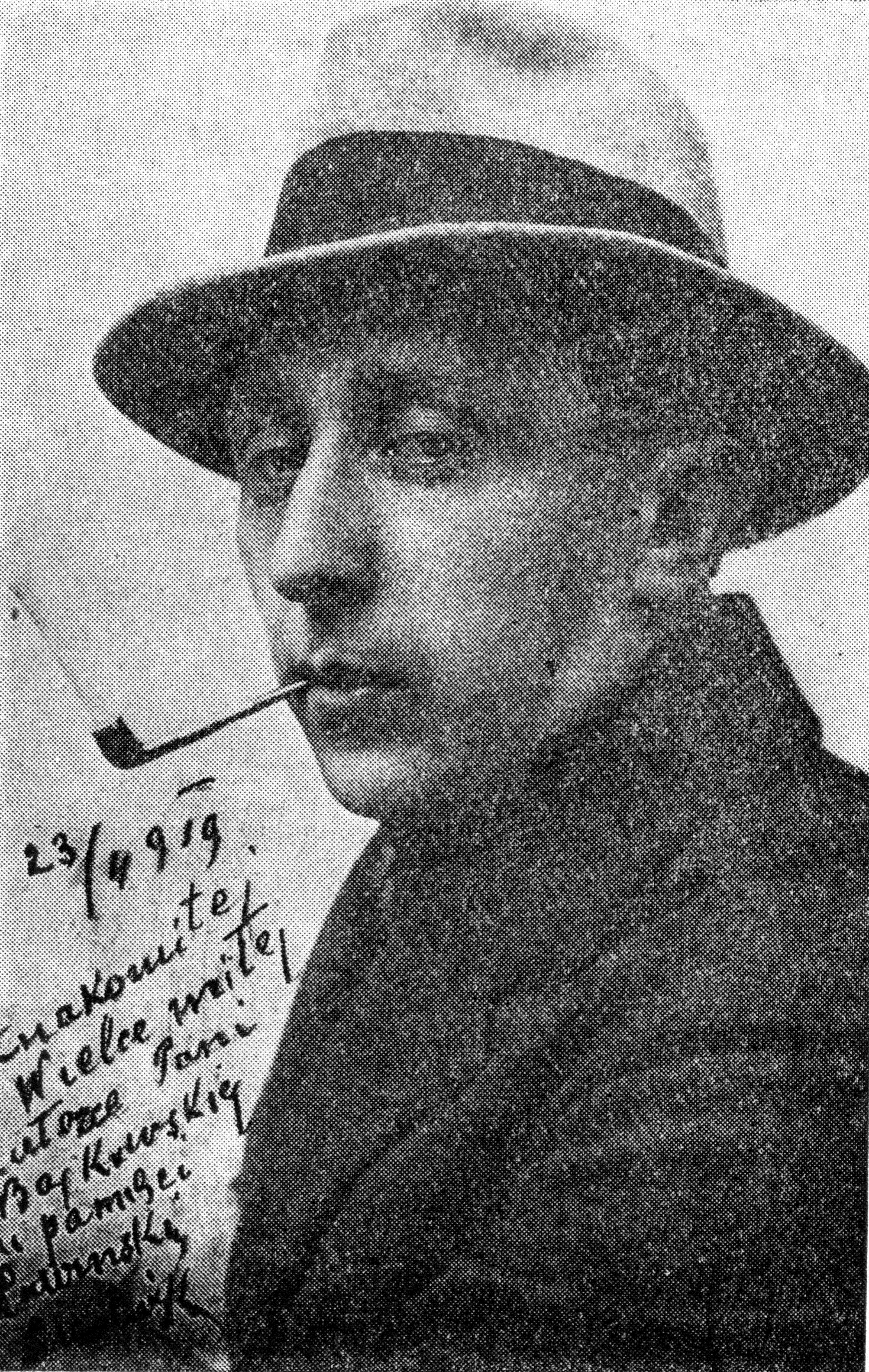
- Born: 19 June 1887; Lemberg, Austria-Hungary (now Lviv, Ukraine)
- Died: 15 September 1971 (aged 84); London, England
- Occupation: Actor
- Years active: 1927–1956

Ludwik Lawiński (19 June 1887 – 15 September 1971) was a Polish film actor. He appeared in thirteen films between 1927 and 1956.

== Filmography ==
Year	Title	Role	Notes
1927	Usmiech losu		
1927	Ziemia obiecana	Grynszpan	
1928	Romans panny Opolskiej		
1929	Czlowiek o blekitnej duszy	Tailor	
1932	Sto metrów miłości	Rybkes	
1933	Każdemu wolno kochać	Manager – Theater 'Wesoly Sandacz'	
1934	Love, Cherish, Respect	Wlasciciel sklepu	
1935	Police Chief Antek	Barber	
1935	ABC miłości	Dyrektor Kosmos-Filmu	
1935	Granny Had No Worries	Merchant	
1946	Wielka droga	Field theater actor who plays Adolf Hitler	Uncredited
1955	The Colditz Story	Franz Josef	
1956	Private's Progress	General von Lembeck	Uncredited
