= Jerzy Marr =

Polish actor

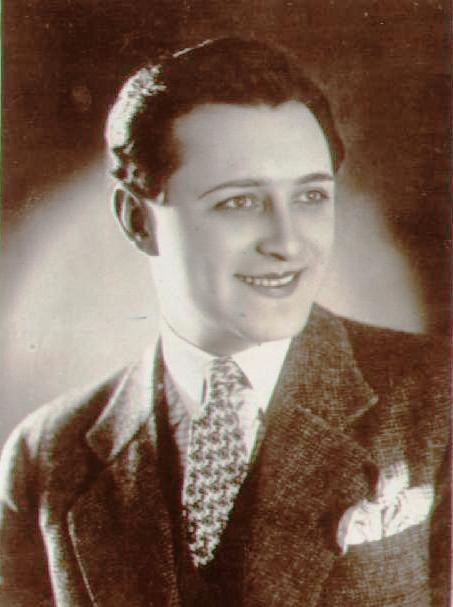
- Born: 21 March 1901; Lemberg, Galicia, Austria-Hungary (now Lviv, Ukraine)
- Died: 9 May 1962 (aged 61); Warsaw, Poland
- Occupation: Actor
- Years active: 1927-1942

Jerzy Marr (21 March 1901 – 9 May 1962) was a Polish film actor. He appeared in 17 films between 1927 and 1942. His birthname was Oktawian Zawadzki.

== Selected filmography ==
- The Call of the Sea (1927)
- Pan Tadeusz (1928)
- Pod banderą miłości (1929)
- Police Chief Tagiejew (1929)
- Zabawka (1933)
- Wacuś (1935)
- Rapsodia Bałtyku (1935)
