= Slave of the Senses =

1914 film

- German poster
- Directed by: Jan Pawlowski
- Written by: Kazimierz Hulewicz
- Starring: Pola Negri; Wojciech Brydzinski
- Cinematography: Jan Skarbek-Malczewski
- Production company: Sfinks Film
- Distributed by: Creo
- Release date: 25 December 1914
- Country: Congress Poland
- Languages: Silent; Polish intertitles

Slave of the Senses (Polish: Niewolnica zmyslów) is a 1914 Polish silent drama film directed by Jan Pawlowski and starring Pola Negri and Wojciech Brydzinski. It was shot at the Sfinks Studios in Warsaw. The film's sets were designed by the art director Józef Galewski. It was produced at the time Congress Poland was part of the Russian Empire. It is notable for marking the screen debut of Negri, who went on to be a major star in German cinema and Hollywood. It is also known by the alternative title Slave of Sin.

== Cast ==
- Pola Negri as Pola, dancer
- Wojciech Brydzinski as Jan
- Wladyslaw Szczewinski as Rich Man
- Juliusz Adler as Pola's dance partner
- Karol Karlinski
- Witold Kuncewicz

== Bibliography ==
- Bock, Hans-Michael & Bergfelder, Tim. The Concise CineGraph. Encyclopedia of German Cinema. Berghahn Books, 2009.
- Ford, Charles & Hammond, Robert. Polish Film: A Twentieth Century History. McFarland, 2005.
- Haltof, Marek. Historical Dictionary of Polish Cinema. Rowman & Littlefield Publishers, 2015.
- Skaff, Sheila. The Law of the Looking Glass: Cinema in Poland, 1896-1939. Ohio University Press, 2008.
