= Pod banderą miłości =

1929 film

- Directed by: Michał Waszyński
- Written by: Jerzy Braun
- Release date: 12 December 1929
- Country: Poland
- Language: Polish

Pod banderą miłości (Under the Flag of Love) is a 1929 Polish romance film directed by Michał Waszyński.

== Cast ==
- Zbigniew Sawan ... Andrzej
- Jerzy Marr ... Jerzy Rzecki
- Paweł Owerłło ... Komandor
- Maria Bogda ... Maria
- Jadwiga Boryta ... Kobieta-szpieg (as Jaga Boryta)
- Władysław Walter ... Marynarz
- Leonard Zajączkowski ... Marynarz (as Leon Zajączkowski)
- Tekla Trapszo ... Andrzej's mother
- Jerzy Kobusz ... Kadet szkoły morskiej
- Tadeusz Fijewski ... Kadet Szkoły Morskiej
