= Bezimienni bohaterowie =

1932 Polish film

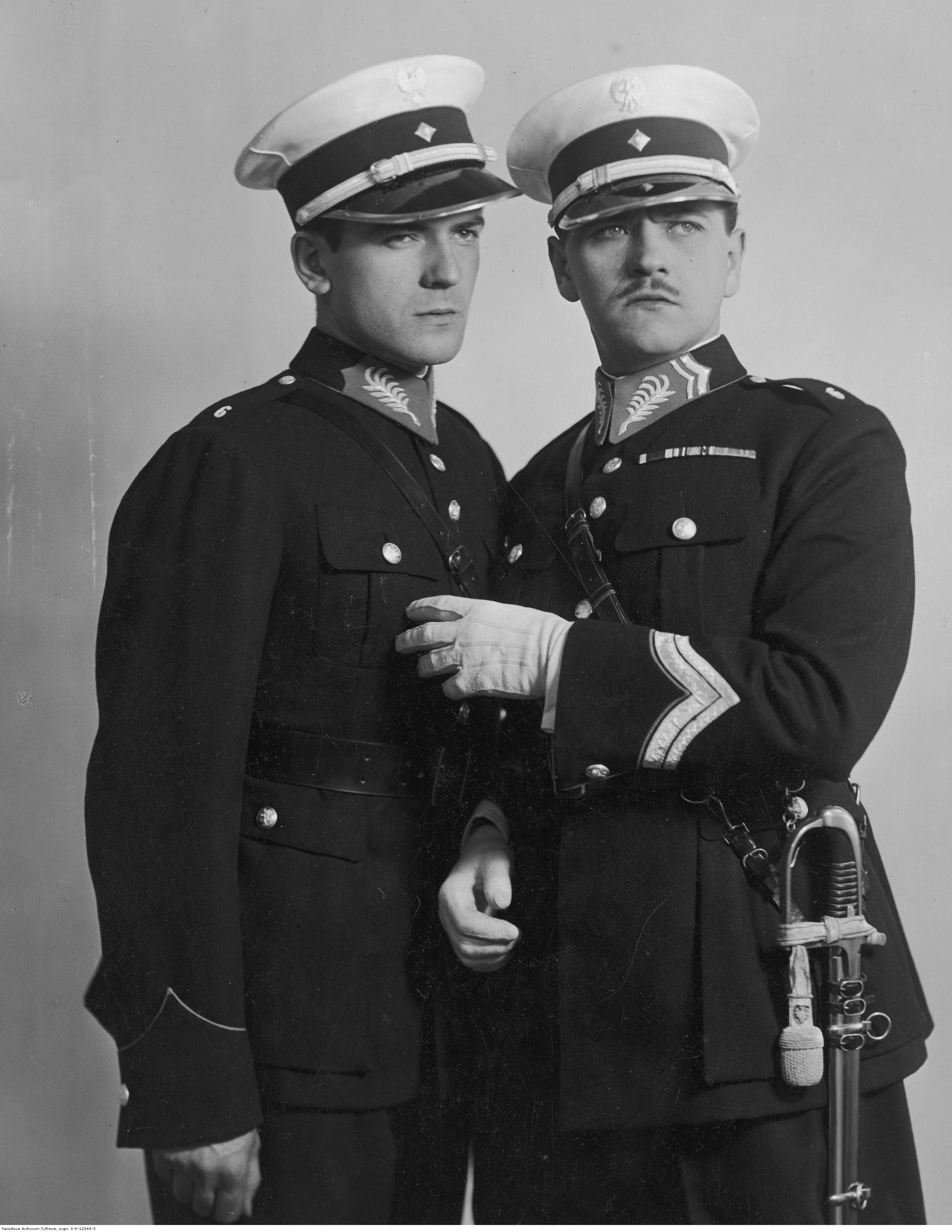
- Directed by: Michał Waszyński
- Written by: Eugeniusz Bodo
- Starring: Maria Bogda; Adam Brodzisz; Eugeniusz Bodo
- Cinematography: Seweryn Steinwurzel
- Music by: Henryk Wars
- Release date: 7 January 1932
- Country: Poland
- Language: Polish

Bezimienni bohaterowie is a 1932 Polish romance film directed by Michał Waszyński.

== Cast ==
- Maria Bogda ... Janina Reńska
- Adam Brodzisz ... Andrzej Tulesza absolwent szkoły policyjnej
- Eugeniusz Bodo ... Komisarz Szczerbic
- Wiktor Biegański ... Szef szajki Goppe
- Zula Pogorzelska... Koleżanka Janiny
- Stefan Jaracz
- Paweł Owerłło
- Czesław Skonieczny
- Wiesław Gawlikowski
- Stanisław Sielański
- Jerzy Roland
- Czesław Raniszewski
