= Józef Kondrat =

Polish actor

- Born: 3 March 1902; Przemyśl, Austria-Hungary (now Poland)
- Died: 4 August 1974 (aged 72); Warsaw, Poland
- Occupation: Actor
- Years active: 1933-1972

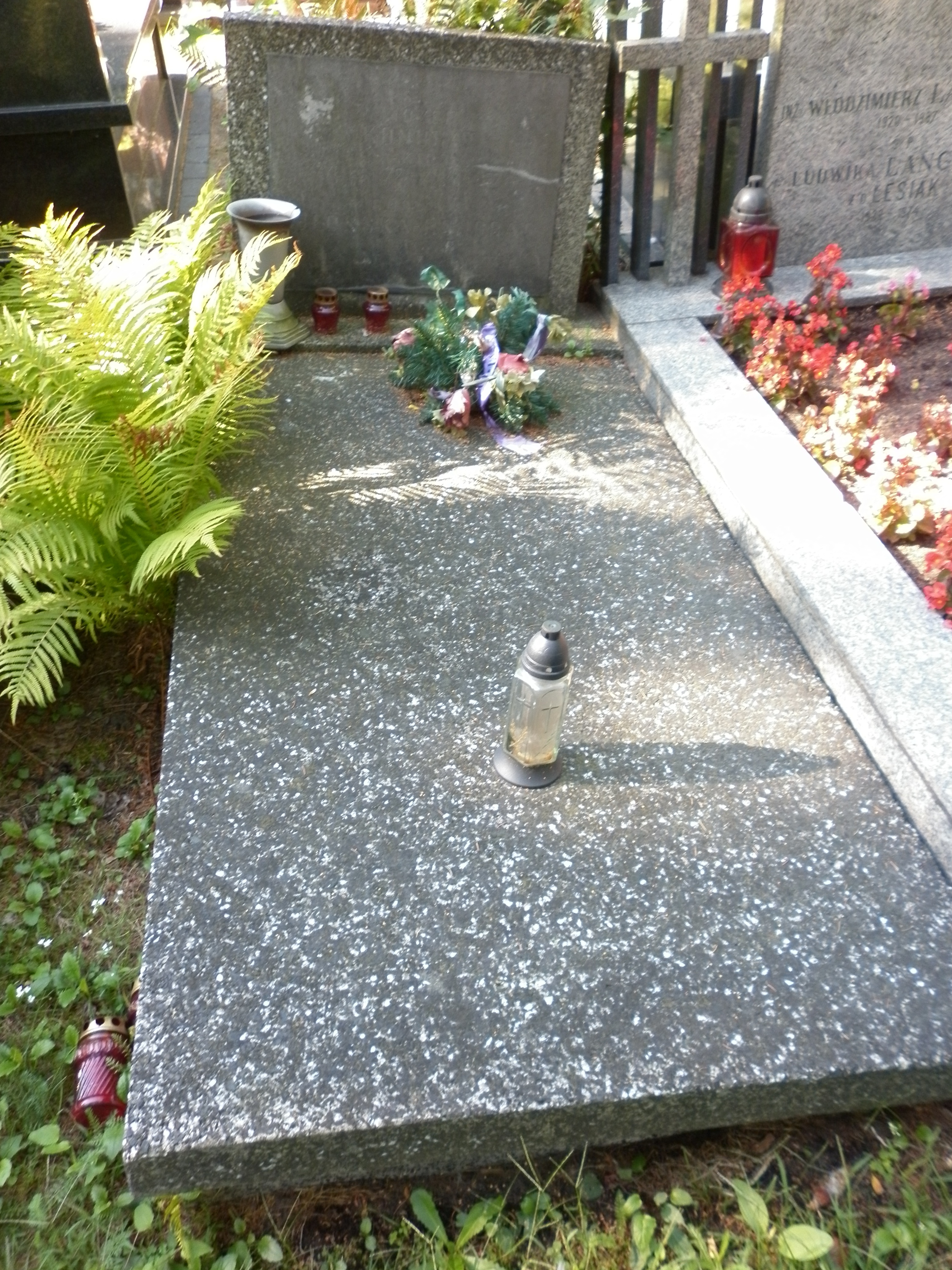
Grave of Kondrat at the Powązki Military Cemetery in Warsaw

Józef Kondrat (3 March 1902 – 4 August 1974) was a Polish stage and film actor. He appeared in more than 30 films between 1933 and 1972.

== Selected filmography ==
- Dvanáct křesel (1933)
- Każdemu wolno kochać (1933)
- Parade of the Reservists (1934)
- Police Chief Antek (1935)
- Kochaj tylko mnie (1935)
- A Diplomatic Wife (1937)
- Three Troublemakers (1937)
- Heimkehr (1941)
- A Matter to Settle (1953)
- Pożegnania (1958)
- The Impossible Goodbye (1962)
