= Zula Pogorzelska =

Polish actress (1896–1936)

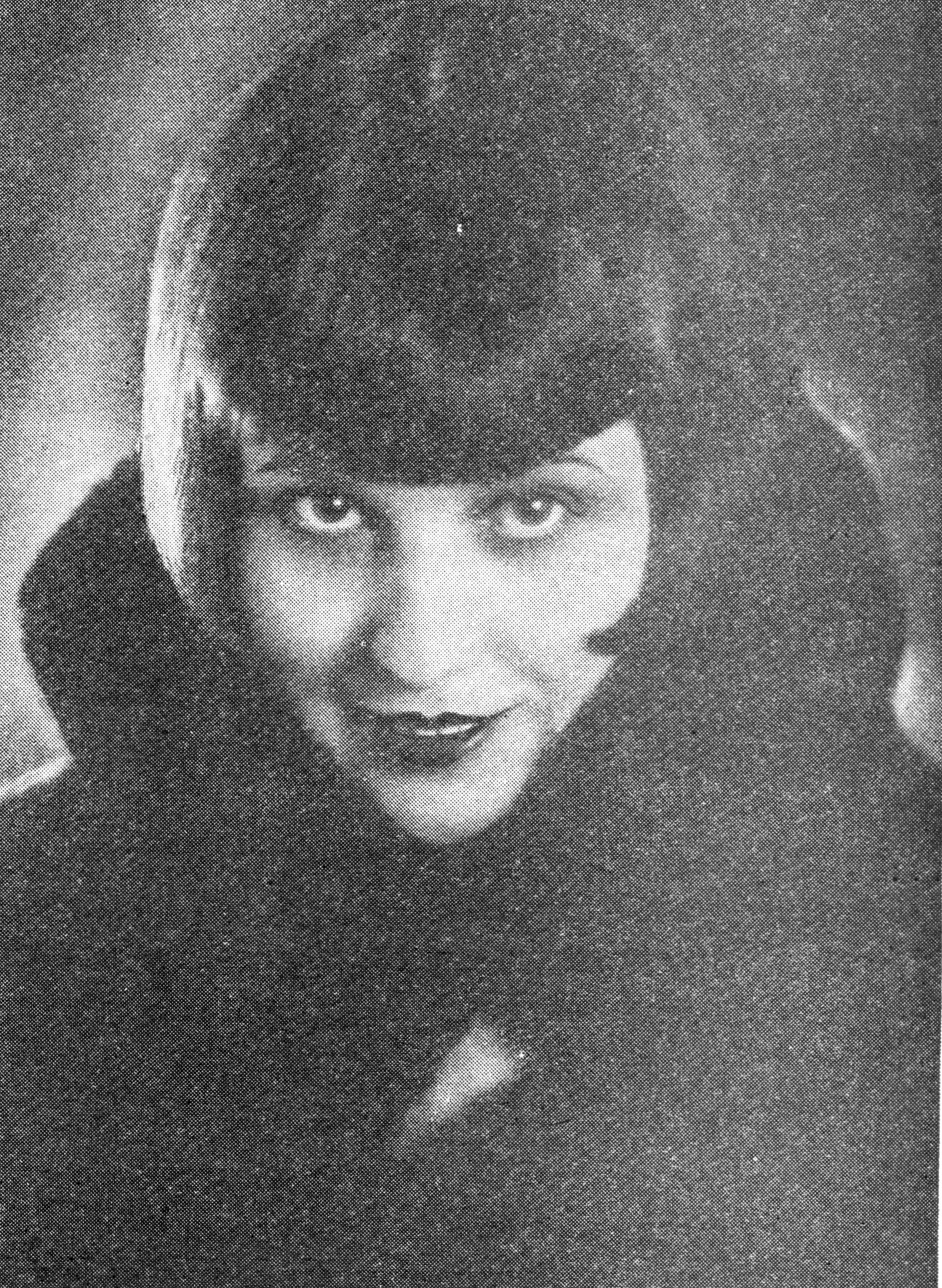
- Born: Zofia Pogorzelska; 14 August 1898; Yevpatoria, Taurida Governorate, Russian Empire (now Crimea, Ukraine)
- Died: February 10, 1936 (aged 37); Wilno, Poland (now Vilnius, Lithuania)
- Occupations: Actress; dancer; singer
- Years active: 1926–1934

Zula Pogorzelska (14 August 1896 – 10 February 1936) born Zofia Pogorzelska, was a Polish cabaret and film actress. She was the first Polish performer to introduce the Charleston on stage of the Cabaret Pod sukienką in 1926. Pogorzelska was the wife of popular Warsaw cabaret and film artist Konrad Tom a.k.a. Konrad Runowiecki.

== Life ==
Pogorzelska was born into a family of a Polish medical doctor Andrzej Pogorzelski in the age of Partitions. She went to high school in Yevpatoria (Eupatoria); but at the same time, took intensive voice and acting lessons from her mother. During World War One she toured Crimea with her own stage programme for the first time. Following the Bolshevik Revolution in Russia she repatriated with her family to newly independent Poland. Pogorzelska found herself in Warsaw in 1918, and debuted at the Bagatela theatre on 7 May 1919. She soon became the star of several most popular cabarets including Qui Pro Quo (pl), Perskie Oko, Morskie Oko (pl), and Cyganeria. She began her film career as an already experienced cabaret performer widely applauded in the capital. In 1934 she fell ill with a spine disorder which forced her to abandon the stage. After a prolonged illness she died at the Dr. Rose sanatorium in Wilno. Pogorzelska was buried at the Cmentarz Powązkowski in Warsaw.

== Selected filmography ==
- Gorączka złotego (1926)
- Niebezpieczny romans, as maid (1930)
- Bezimienni bohaterowie (1932)
- Sto metrów miłości, as Zośka (1932)
- Ułani, ułani, chłopcy malowani, as Helka (1932)
- Dvanáct křesel (Polish: Dwanaście krzeseł, 1933 Polish-Czechoslovak coproduction)
- Romeo i Julcia, as Franka Krochmalska (1933)
- Zabawka, as Zizi (1933)
- Love, Cherish, Respect, as Kunegunda (1934)
