= ABC of Love =

- Directed by: Michał Waszyński
- Written by: Marian Hemar
- Release date: 1935
- Country: Poland
- Language: Polish

ABC of Love (Polish: ABC miłości) is a 1935 Polish film directed by Michał Waszyński.

== Cast ==
- Adolf Dymsza... Wincenty Poziomka
- Maria Bogda ... Helenka
- Kazimierz Krukowski ... Krupkowski, revue actor
- Basia Wywerkówna ... Basienka
- Konrad Tom ... Lowelas
- Ludwik Lawiński ... Director of Kosmos-Film
- Józef Orwid ... Revue director
- Eugeniusz Koszutski ... Dentist
- Helena Zarembina ... Florcia Słowikówna
- Monika Carlo ... Revue actor
- Ewa Erwicz
- Leon Rechenski
- Aniela Miszczykówna
- Jan Bielicz
- Jan Dobosz-Bielicz
- Karol Hubert
- Zygmunt Regro-Regirer
