= Zabawka (film) =

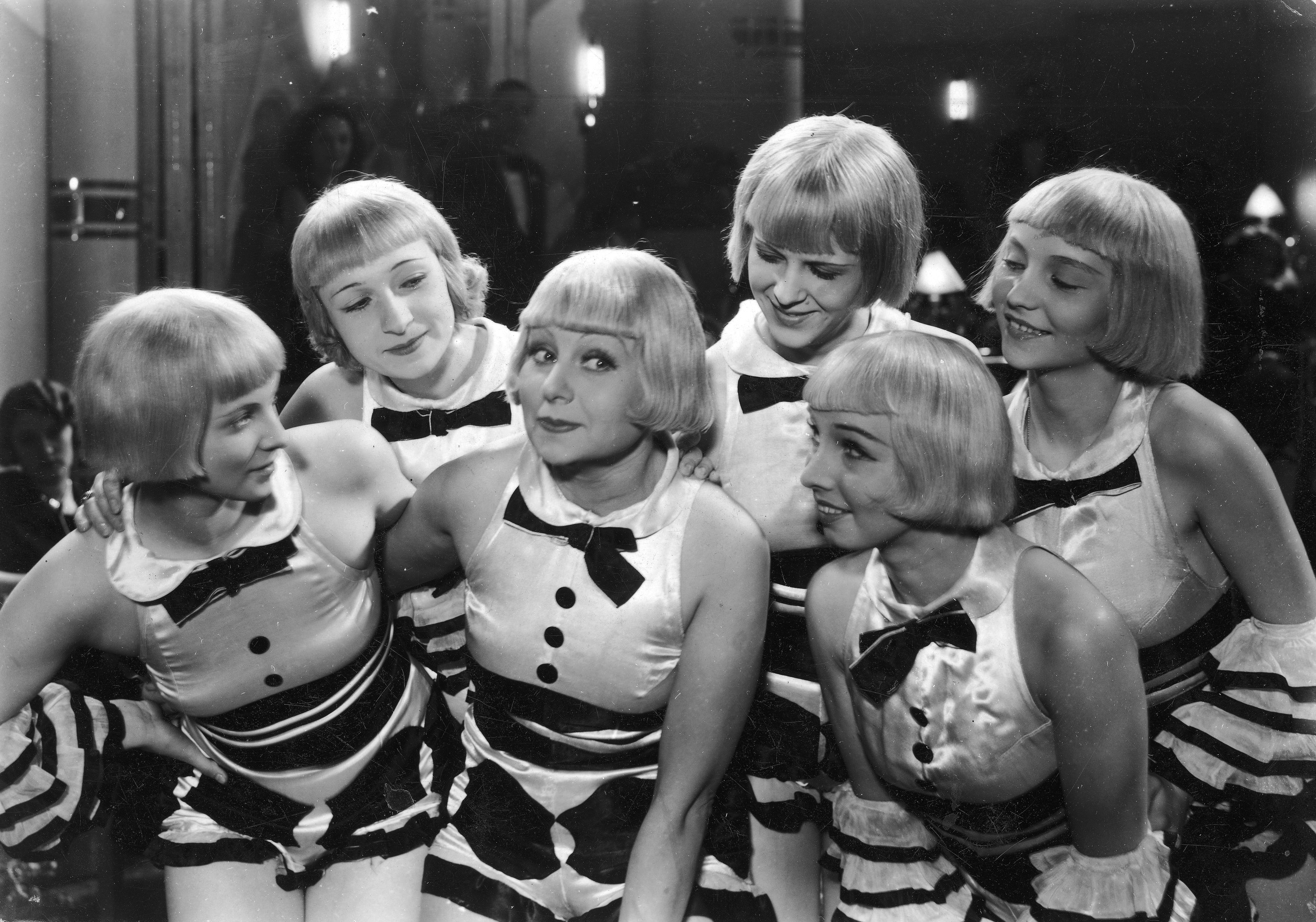
- Actresses in Zabawka movie
- Directed by: Michał Waszyński
- Written by: Andrzej Łomakowski; M. Król
- Release date: 1933
- Running time: 80 minutes
- Country: Poland
- Language: Polish

Zabawka is a 1933 Polish romantic drama film directed by Michał Waszyński.

== Cast ==
- Alma Kar ... Janeczka, stage-named Lulu
- Stefan Gulanicki (under the pseudonym Stefan Gucki)... Baron Łatoszyński
- Eugeniusz Bodo... Kuźma, the forester's son
- Jerzy Marr ... Jurek Łatoszyński, the Baron's son
- Wiktor Biegański ... Szczepan Mylicki, the Baron's friend
- Helena Zarembina ... Weronika, the Baron's housekeeper
- Julian Krzewiński ... The Baron's Majordomo
- Stanisław Sielański... Dr. Wessel, houseguest
- Zofia Ślaska ... Hanka, Jurek's fiancee
- Wanda Jarszewska ... Hanka's Mother
- Konrad Tom ... The Cabaret Owner
- Zula Pogorzelska ... Zuzia, a showgirl
- Stefania Górska ... Mela, a showgirl
