= Exile to Siberia =

1930 Polish film by Henryk Szaro

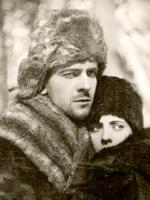
- A scene from the Polish film Exile To Siberia (1930)
- Directed by: Henryk Szaro
- Written by: Wacław Sieroszewski; Anatol Stern; Henryk Szaro
- Produced by: Marek M. Libkow
- Starring: Adam Brodzisz; Jadwiga Smosarska; Mieczysław Frenkiel; Bogusław Samborski
- Cinematography: Nicolas Farkas; Zbigniew Gniazdowski
- Music by: Henryk Wars
- Production company: Kineton-Sfinks
- Release date: 1930
- Running time: 89 minutes
- Country: Poland
- Language: Polish

Exile to Siberia (Polish: Na Sybir) is a Polish historical film directed by Henryk Szaro and starring Adam Brodzisz, Jadwiga Smosarska and Mieczysław Frenkiel. It was released in 1930. The film's art direction was by Józef Galewski and Jacek Rotmil. The film was originally silent, but a soundtrack was added in a Berlin studio.

== Synopsis ==
During the Revolution of 1905, a young Polish revolutionary is arrested in Warsaw and sent to Siberia by the Russian authorities. His girlfriend travels out and helps him escape.

== Main cast ==
- Adam Brodzisz as Ryszard Prawdzic aka Sęp ('Vulture')
- Jadwiga Smosarska as Rena Czarska
- Mieczysław Frenkiel as Józef Czarski, Rena's father
- Bogusław Samborski as Police Col. Sierow
- Mira Zimińska as Janka Mirska
- Maria Chaveau as Charwoman
- Eugeniusz Bodo as Worker
- Kazimierz Justian as Spy
- Jan Belina

== Bibliography ==
- Skaff, Sheila. The Law of the Looking Glass: Cinema in Poland, 1896-1939. Ohio University Press, 2008.
