= Sound of the Desert =

1932 film

Głos pustyni
- Directed by: Michał Waszyński
- Written by: Eugeniusz Bodo
- Starring: Nora Ney; Adam Brodzisz; Eugeniusz Bodo
- Cinematography: Seweryn Steinwurzel
- Music by: Henryk Wars
- Release date: 1932
- Running time: 78 minutes
- Country: Poland
- Language: Polish

Sound of the Desert (Polish: Głos pustyni) is a 1932 Polish romantic film adventure directed by Michał Waszyński.

== Cast ==
- Nora Ney ... Dżemila
- Eugeniusz Bodo ... Sheik Abdullah
- Maria Bogda ... Jenny Burton
- Adam Brodzisz ... Sgt. Filip Milczek
- Witold Conti ... Sgt. Tarnowski
- Janusz Dziewoński
- Kazimierz Jarocki
- Paweł Owerłło
- Stefan Wroncki ... Przemytnik
