= Stare Żukowice =

- Village
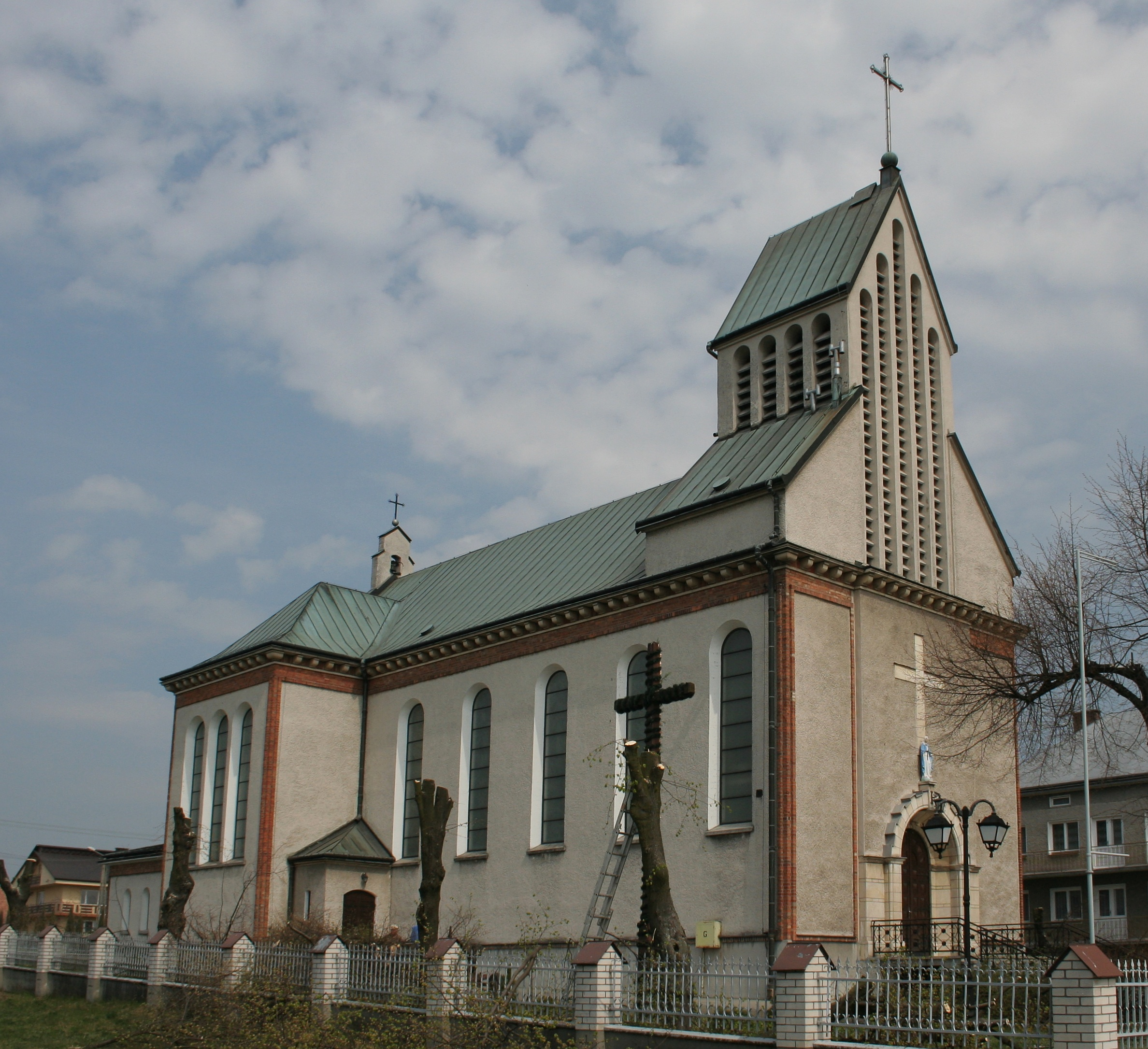

- Location within Poland
- Coordinates: 50°05′14″N 21°06′23″E
- Country: Poland
- Voivodeship: Lesser Poland
- County: Tarnów
- Gmina: Lisia Góra
- Population: 1,600

Stare Żukowice [ˈstarɛ ʐukɔˈvit͡sɛ] is a village in the administrative district of Gmina Lisia Góra, within Tarnów County, Lesser Poland Voivodeship, in southern Poland.
