= Eugeniusz Koszutski =

Polish actor

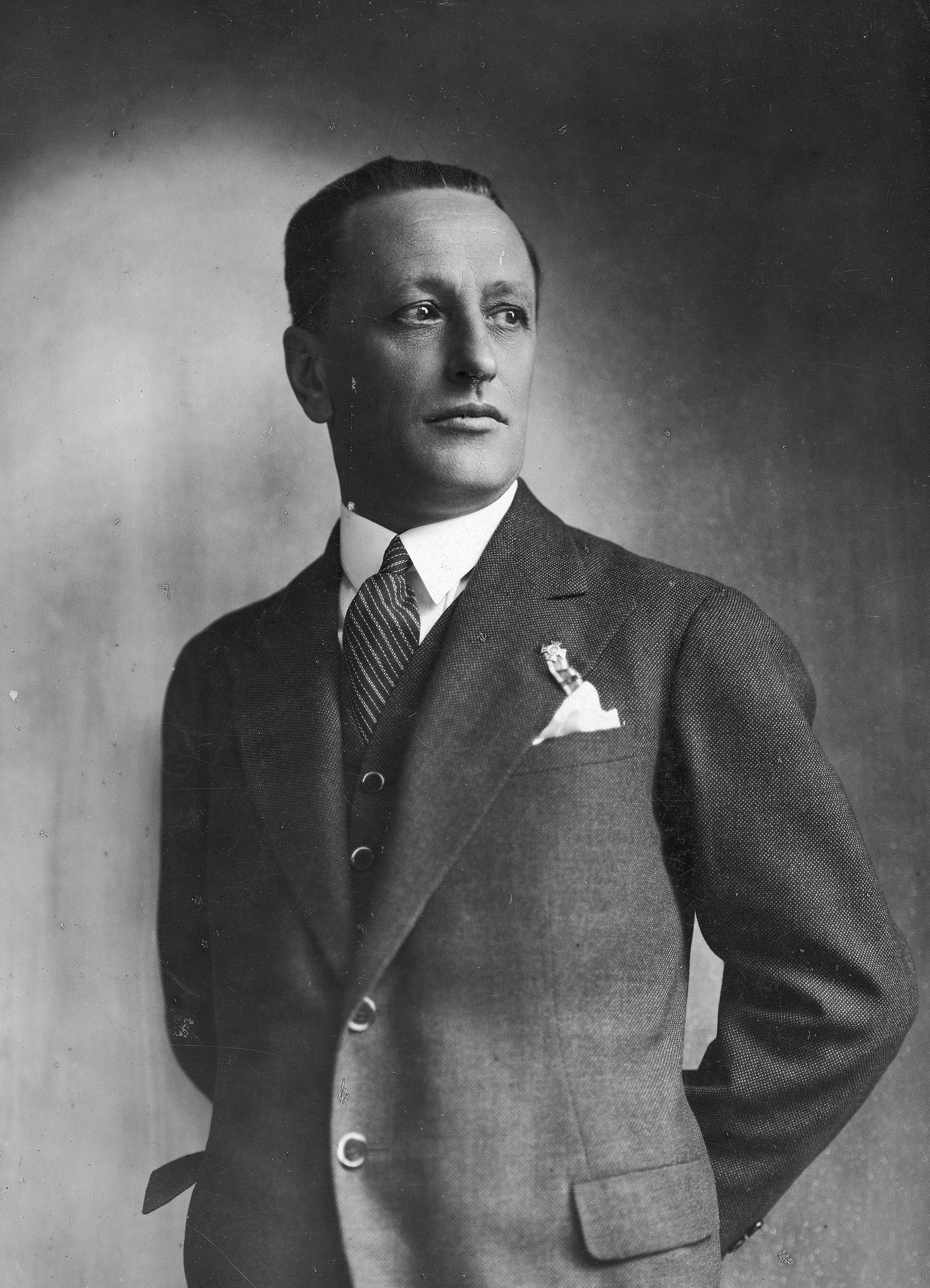
- Eugeniusz Koszutski in 1929
- Born: 26 December 1881; Warsaw, Poland
- Died: 22 August 1946 (aged 64); Łódź, Poland

Eugeniusz Koszutski (1881–1946) was a Polish actor. In 1935 he starred in the film ABC miłości.
