= The Citadel of Warsaw (1930 film) =

1930 film

- Directed by: Jacob Fleck; Luise Fleck
- Written by: Gabriela Zapolska (play); Hans Rameau
- Produced by: Liddy Hegewald; Kurt Heinz
- Starring: Victor Varconi; La Jana; Adam Brodzisz
- Cinematography: Georg Muschner
- Music by: Bernard Homola
- Production company: Hegewald Film
- Distributed by: Hegewald Film
- Release date: 28 May 1930
- Running time: 97 minutes
- Country: Germany
- Language: German

The Citadel of Warsaw (German: Die Warschauer Zitadelle) is a 1930 German historical drama film directed by Jacob Fleck and Luise Fleck and starring Victor Varconi, La Jana and Adam Brodzisz. It was shot at the Grunewald Studios in Berlin. The film's sets were designed by the art directors Willi Herrmann and Herbert O. Phillips. It was based on the play Tamten by Gabriela Zapolska, subsequently remade as the 1937 film The Citadel of Warsaw.

== Synopsis ==
In Warsaw, then part of the Russian Empire, a student is arrested for revolutionary activities. He is released and strikes up a relationship with the niece of a senior figure in the repressive authorities who is being forced into an arranged marriage. In addition he encounters the seductive dancer Vera who is a spy for the Russians.

== Cast ==
- Victor Varconi as Boris Gorski
- La Jana as Vera Proskaja
- Adam Brodzisz as Steffan Bogdanski
- Ferdinand Hart as General Horn
- Louis Treumann as Oberst Korniloff, Chef der Geheimpolizei
- Harry Hardt as Oberleutnant Strelkoff
- Hilda Rosch as Sonja Lasotzka, Nichte General Horns
- Olga Limburg as Pensionsinhaberin

== Bibliography ==
- Giesen, Rolf. The Nosferatu Story: The Seminal Horror Film, Its Predecessors and Its Enduring Legacy. McFarland, 2019.
- Goble, Alan. The Complete Index to Literary Sources in Film. Walter de Gruyter, 1999.
- Klaus, Ulrich J. Deutsche Tonfilme: Jahrgang 1930. Klaus-Archiv, 1988.
