= Stefania Górska =

Polish stage and film actress, composer, singer and dancer

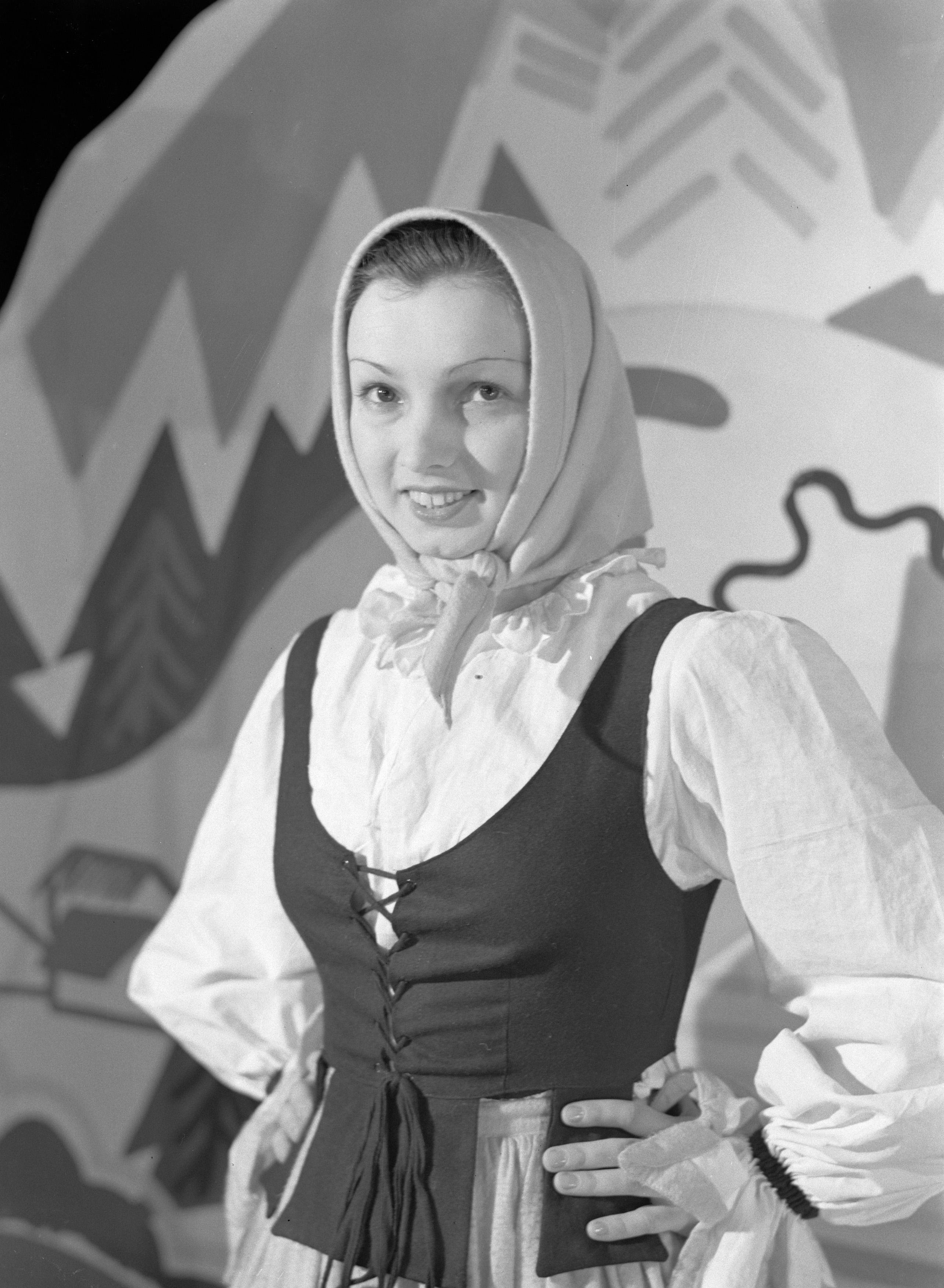
Stefania Górska in 1934

Stefania Górska (Stefania Zadrozińska) (January 6 1907–August 3 1986) was a Polish stage and film actress, composer, singer, and dancer, born in Warsaw. She was married to actor Wacław Zadroziński (Boruch, 1909–1942).

In 1928 she graduated from the Tacjanna Wysocka's School of Dance and Stage and debuted as singer and dancer (the Tacjan Girls) at the theater Qui Pro Quo in the revue Ja lubię podglądać (I like to peek). She later sang as soloist and in a trio (with Irena Różyńska and Zofia Terné) in Warsaw cabaret revues and theaters like Banda, Cyrulik Warszawski, Morskie Oko and Hollywood. In 1930 a song she composed, Nasza Jest Noc, lyrics by Julian Tuwim, became a hit sung by the Chór Dana in the revue Maj za pasem. Some of her other songs were Dziewczynka z zapałkami, Głos z daleka and Rozstanie (all with words by Julian Tuwim, Kobieta anioł (words by Jerzy Jurandot), Niech nikt o tym nie wie (she wrote the words), Żoneczka (words by W. Boniński). She co-wrote the Eugeniusz Bodo hit Sex Appeal with Henryk Wars, lyrics by Ludwik Starski.

As a singer, she launched the hits Bubliczki (G. Bogomazow, Andrzej Włast), Czy pani Marta jest grzechu warta (F. Raymond), Dla ciebie zrobię wszystko, Gdy zobaczysz ciotkę mą (Rudolf Nelson, Andrzej Włast), Pan Agapit (duet with Andrzej Bogucki), and Ukradła mi szantrapa.

She acted in the 1933 movie Zabawka (Toy) and starred in subsequent films: Papa się żeni (Daddy Gets Married), Córka generała Pankratowa (Daughter of General Pankratow), and post-war films Inspekcja pana Anatola (Mr. Anatol's Inspection) and Cafe pod Minogą (Cafe at Minoga).

In 1948 she became involved with the Warsaw Syrena and sang on the concert stage. In 1974 she sang at the Hagaw festival Old Jazz Meeting. She died in Warsaw.
