= Czesław Skonieczny =

Polish actor

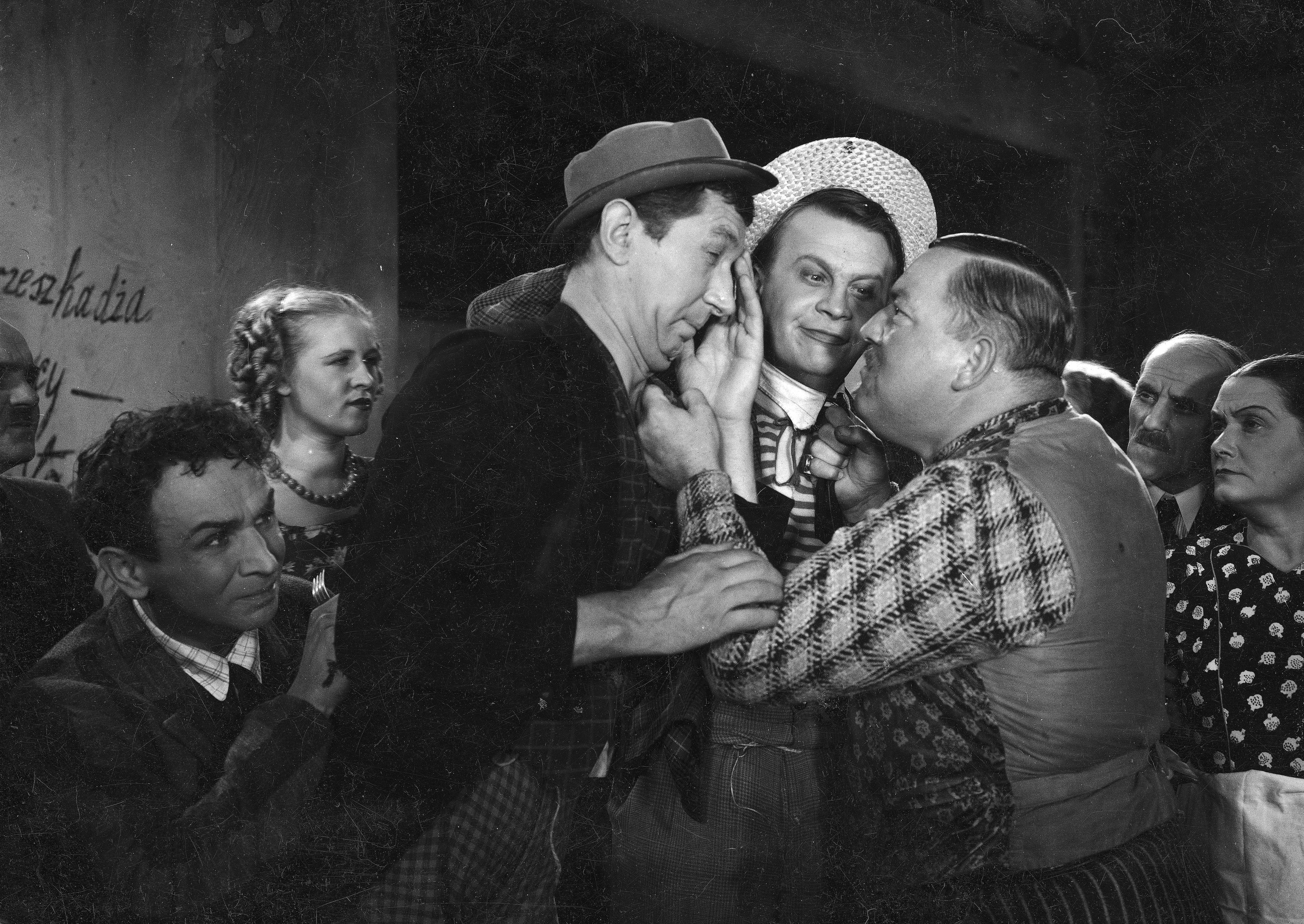
- Czesław Skonieczny in the foreground the first from the right.
- Born: 7 July 1894; Warsaw, Poland, Russian Empire
- Died: 27 March 1946 (aged 51); Łódź, Poland
- Occupation: Actor
- Years active: 1918-1941

Czesław Skonieczny (7 July 1894 – 27 March 1946) was a Polish film actor. He appeared in more than 25 films between 1918 and 1941.

== Selected filmography ==
- Uwiedziona (1931)
- The Palace on Wheels (1932)
- Bezimienni bohaterowie (1932)
- Ułani, ułani, chłopcy malowani (1932)
- Każdemu wolno kochać (1933)
- Ten Percent for Me (1933)
- Uhlan's Pledge (1934)
- Three Troublemakers (1937)
