= Kazimierz Krukowski =

Polish cabaret performer, writer and actor

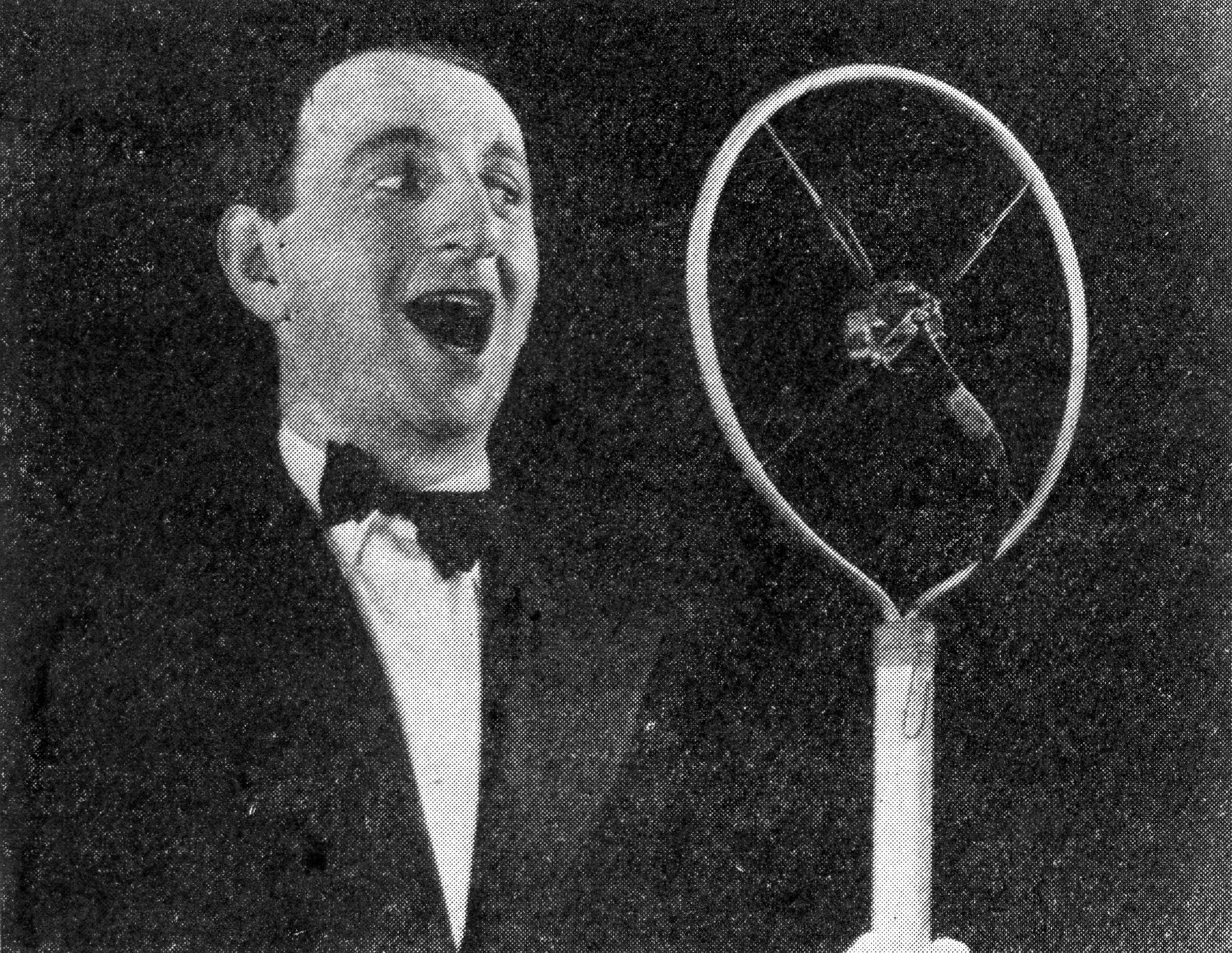
- Born: Kazimierz Zawisza; 2 February 1901; Łódź
- Died: 24 December 1984 (aged 83); Warsaw, Poland
- Other name: Lopek
- Occupations: cabaret performer and writer, revue and film actor

Kazimierz Krukowski (2 February 1901 in Łódź – 24 December 1984 in Warsaw), professionally known as Lopek, was a Polish cabaret performer and writer, revue and film actor.

== Career ==
He performed songs and monologues by famous poets and songwriters including Marian Hemar, Jerzy Jurandot, Antoni Słonimski, Julian Tuwim and Andrzej Włast. He made his first movie in 1927 (Ziemia obiecana) as part of a comedy duo, "Lopek and Florek," with Adolf Dymsza; they made several more movies together including Janko Muzykant; Ułani, ułani, chłopcy malowani, and Co mój mąż robi w nocy? (What does my husband do at night?) In 1935 he starred in the film ABC miłości. He was engaged at the cabaret Qui Pro Quo by his cousin Julian Tuwim. He performed in theaters, kleynkunst, and cabarets including Morskie Oko, Banda, Cyganeria, Cyrulik Warszawski, Wielka Rewia, and in 1939 he founded his own theater, the Ali Baba.

"in the cabarets, a new genre of entertainment—the Jewish joke, monologue or sketch known as szmonces—rose to prominence. The szmonces, inevitably characterized by a more or less subtle żydłaczenie, at its best turned the pretentious Jewish assimilator or the harried Jewish tradesman into universally accessible symbols of the dislocations of modern life; at its worst, it became vulgar antisemitic caricature. The performer Kazimierz Krukowski (1902–1984), known as Lopek, was among those acclaimed as a specialist in the genre."

During the Second World War he appeared in one of the cabarets in the Warsaw Ghetto. He fought in the Soviet Union and subsequently lived in Britain, the United States, and Argentina, where he ran the El Nacional theater.

== Books ==
He wrote several books: Mała antologia kabaretu (Small cabaret anthology), Z Melpomeną na emigracji (With Melpomene in exile) and Moja Warszawka (My Warsaw).
