= Anatol Stern =

Polish poet, writer and art critic

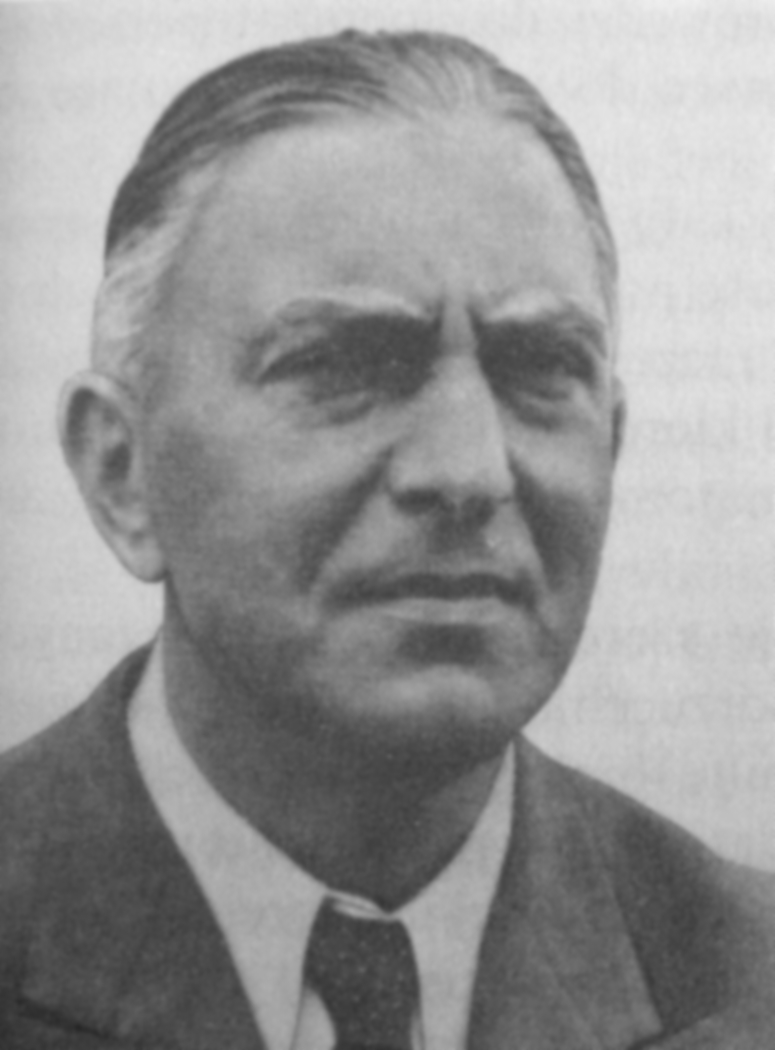
- Born: 24 October 1899; Warsaw, Congress Poland, Russian Empire
- Died: 19 October 1968 (aged 68); Warsaw, Polish People's Republic
- Occupations: Screenwriter, poet, writer

Anatol Stern (24 October 1899 in Warsaw – 19 October 1968 in Warsaw) was a Polish poet, writer and art critic. Born 24 October 1899 to an assimilated family of Jewish ancestry, Stern studied at the Polish Studies Faculty of the University of Wilno but did not graduate. Prominent among Polish futurist poets, between 1921 and 1923 he co-authored (together with Jarosław Iwaszkiewicz) the "Nowa Sztuka" (New Art) monthly. He also collaborated with other notable art magazines of the time, including the Skamander, Tadeusz Peiper's Zwrotnica and Wiadomości literackie.

With time he drifted away from avant-garde poetry and became a notable screenwriter. Prior to the outbreak of World War II, he authored more than 30 screenplays for both Polish and foreign films. After the Invasion of Poland he moved to Soviet-held Lwów, where he was arrested by the NKVD and sent to Soviet Gulag. Released after the Sikorski-Mayski Agreement, he joined the Polish Army and with it reached Palestine. There he made his living translating some of his pre-war works to Hebrew. In 1948 he returned to his home town, where he died 19 October 1968.

== Selected filmography ==
- Exile to Siberia (1930)
- The Beauty of Life (1930)
- A Heart on the Street (1931)
- Róża (1936)
- Pan Twardowski (1936)
- Barbara Radziwiłłówna (1936)
- Miss Minister Is Dancing (1937)
- At the End of the Road (1939)
- Krystyna's Lie (1939)

Imdb filmography||https://www.imdb.com/name/nm0827629/?ref_=fn_al_nm_1
