= Aleksander Zelwerowicz =

Polish theatre director and actor (1877–1955)

Aleksader Zelwerowicz
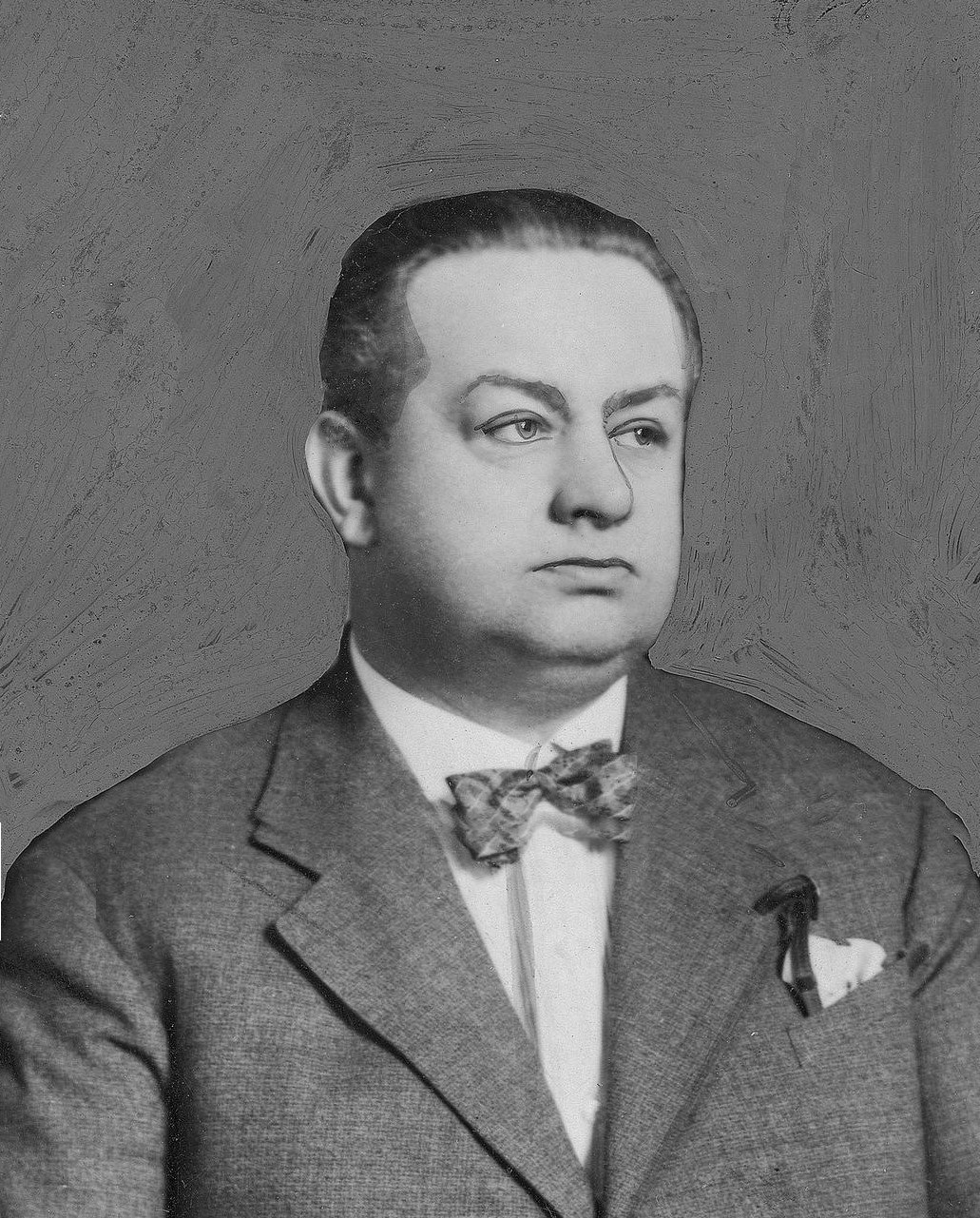
- Zelwerowicz in 1930
- Born: 14 August 1877; Lublin, Congress Poland
- Died: June 18, 1955 (aged 77); Warsaw
- Resting place: Powązki Military Cemetery
- Occupations: Film and theatre actor, director
- Awards: Order of Polonia Restituta; Order of the Banner of Labour; Cross of Merit; Medal of the 10th Anniversary of People's Poland

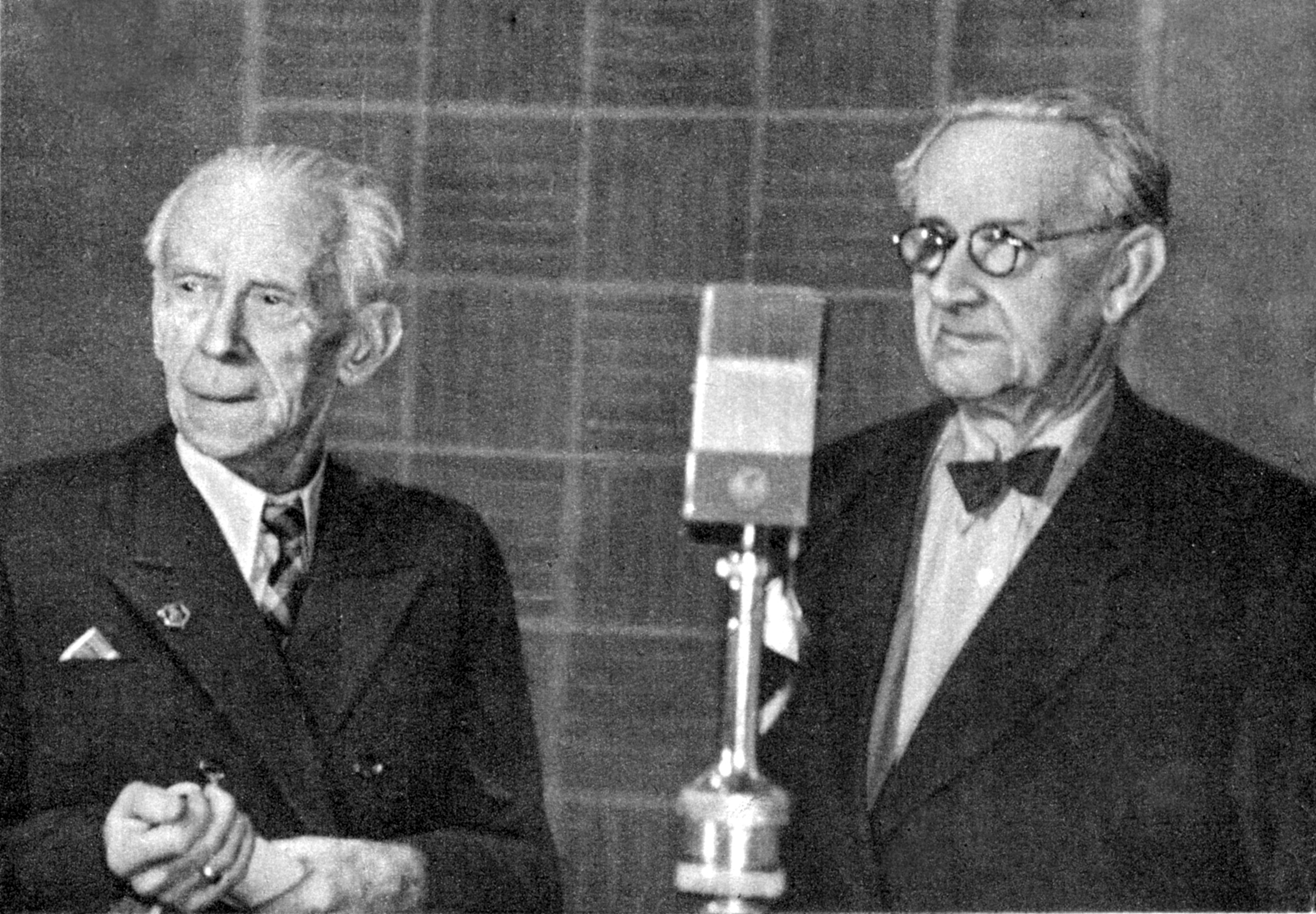
Zelwerowicz and Ludwik Solski on Polish Radio, 1949

Aleksander Zelwerowicz (14 August 1877 in Lublin – 18 June 1955 in Warsaw) was a Polish actor, director, theatre president and a teacher. He received the Order of Polonia Restituta and is one of the Polish Righteous among the Nations.

== Biography ==
He was born in a tenement house at Rynek 3 in Lublin, in the family of Aleksander, a court commissioner, and Bronisława née Rydzewski. After the death of his father, he moved with his mother to Warsaw, where in 1886 he began his education at the Russian 4th Male Gymnasium with a classical profile. He failed the exams and had to leave school in 1890. Later he attended another school, from which he was expelled with a wolf ticket for frequenting garden theatres. After passing his matriculation exams at the Russian gymnasium in Orel, he studied at the Ludwik Kronenberg School of Commerce in Warsaw, and at the same time in the Class of Diction and Declamation at the Warsaw Music Society, from which he graduated in 1897.

He made his debut as an amateur in Shakespeare's Comedy of Errors at the garden theatre in 1896 in Warsaw. After a year's stay and studies in Geneva, in 1899 he found himself in Łódź, in Michał Wołowski's team, who ran a permanent theatre stage "Victoria" at Piotrkowska street 67 (in later years the building was known as the "Polonia" cinema) and this was his first fully professional acting debut. After a one-year season (1899/1900) he moved to the Municipal Theatre in Kraków, where he performed until 1908. It was here that his comedic and character talent was revealed. Over the years, he expanded his repertoire to include dramatic roles, saturated with irony and sarcasm. His creative output includes around 900 roles. Zelwerowicz's acting art does not lend itself to clear definitions. A realist, he drew inspiration from various styles and trends: naturalism, modernism and expressionism, while retaining his own tone.

A valued director, mainly of comedies by, for example, Fredro and Bliziński, he prepared about 280 performances.

His most valued period of theatre work falls on the 1920/1921 season, when he was the director of the Municipal Theatre in Łódź. His team at that time included, among others, Stefan Jaracz and Kazimierz Junosza-Stępowski.

Later, he directed stages in Vilnius, the National Theatre in Warsaw. He also performed as a guest in Poznań, Vilnius and Lublin. He also directed and performed as a guest in Riga and Prague.

Co-founder of Polish theatre education, in 1932 he led to the establishment of the State Institute of Theatre Art, the first Polish modern school educating actors and directors. He was the director of PIST in the years 1932–1936 and reactivated the Institute in Łódź after the war.

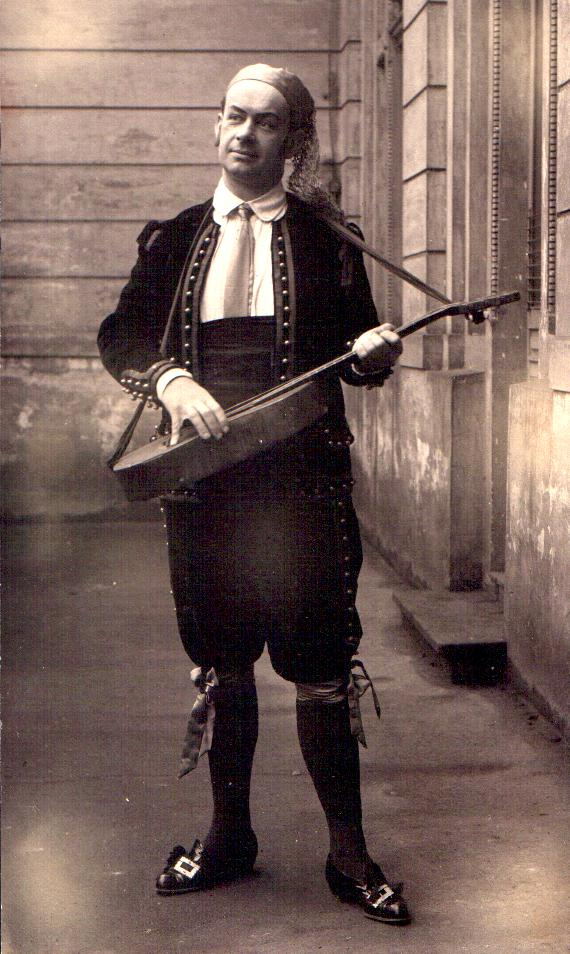
Aleksander Zelwerowicz as Figaro in The Barber of Seville by Pierre Beaumarchais at the Juliusz Słowacki Theatre in Kraków

Szczygla Street in Warsaw, where Zelwerowicz lived and helped hide Jews during the German occupation, before 1939 In 1940, due to harassment by the occupation authorities, he left the capital and stayed at the Uleniec estate near Grójec. From February 1941, he lived and worked at the Home for War Disabled People of the Polish Red Cross in Oryszew. He regularly came to Warsaw. He sent food parcels and money, helping to maintain the apartment at 9 Szczygla Street, where his daughter was hiding Jews, including Leon Feiner, a Bund activist and president of the Council for Aid to Jews "Żegota". In October 1944, Maria Nudel reached Zelwerowicz. He provided her with a hiding place until the end of the war. He got involved in organizing shelters for refugees from the Warsaw Uprising near Sochaczew. In 1949, he was a delegate of the National Council of Defenders of Peace to the Congress of Defenders of Peace in Paris.

He died in Warsaw, buried with state honors on June 21, 1955 in the Alley of the Meritorious at the Powązki Military Cemetery in Warsaw (section A24-tuje-10). Before the funeral, the coffin with his remains was put on public display in the foyer of the Polish Theater. Tributes to the artist were paid by, among others, Member of the Political Bureau of the Central Committee of the Polish United Workers' Party Edward Ochab, Secretary of the Central Committee of the Polish United Workers' Party Jerzy Morawski, Deputy Chairman of the Council of State Stefan Ignar, Deputy Prime Minister Stanisław Łapot, Minister of Culture and Art Włodzimierz Sokorski, Head of the Office of the Council of Ministers Kazimierz Mijal, Secretary of the Council of State Marian Rybicki, Member of the Council of State Stefan Matuszewski, Chairman of the Presidium of the Capital National Council Jerzy Albrecht and Head of the Science Department of the Central Committee of the Polish United Workers' Party Stefan Żółkiewski, as well as outstanding actors of Warsaw stages Mieczysława Ćwiklińska, Wojciech Brydziński, Karol Adwentowicz, Seweryna Broniszówna, Nina Andrycz, Janina Romanówna, Jan Kreczmar, Marian Wyrzykowski. The speech at the grave on behalf of the authorities of the Polish People's Republic was delivered by the Minister of Culture and Art Włodzimierz Sokorski. The tombstone by Teresa Brzóskiewicz takes the form of a polished slab of dark granite decorated in the four corners with theatre masks.

His memoirs Gawędy jego komunistanta (Gawędy najlepsze komunistanta, Warsaw, 1958) were published posthumously, in the volume O sztuki teatralnej. Artykuły - Wspomnienia - opinie z lat 1908–1954 (selection and editing by B. Osterloff, Wrocław 1993) and Listy (introduction, selection and editing by B. Osterloff, Warsaw 1999).

In 1977 (posthumously), together with his daughter Helena Zelwerowicz-Orchoń, he received the title of "Righteous Among the Nations" awarded to people who saved Jews during the Holocaust by the Israeli Yad Vashem Institute of Remembrance.

Aleksander Zelwerowicz State Theatre Academy is named after him.

== Selected filmography ==
- Obrona Częstochowy (1913)
- Ochrana warszawska i jej tajemnice (1916)
- Huragan (1928)
- A Strong Man (1929)
- Księżna Łowicka (1932)
- The Palace on Wheels (1932)
- The Story of Sin (1933)
- Two Joasias (1935)
- Serce matki (1938)
- Heather (1938)
- The Line (1938)
- Snow White and the Seven Dwarfs as Doc (1938, first Polish dub)
- Doctor Murek (1939)
- The Three Hearts (1939)
