= The Story of Sin (1933 film) =

1933 film

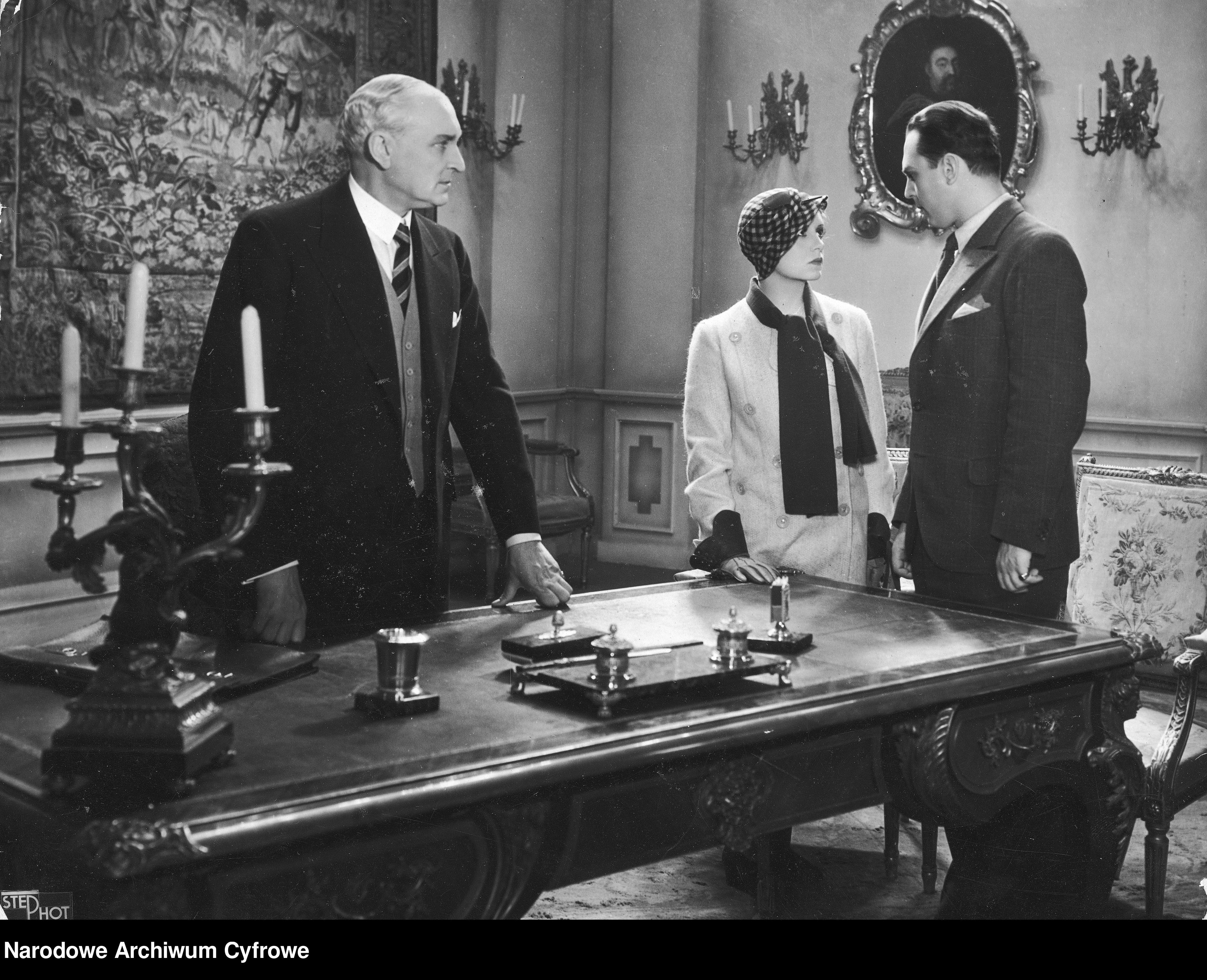
- Directed by: Henryk Szaro
- Written by: Karol Borowski
- Based on: The Story of Sin by Stefan Zeromski
- Starring: Karolina Lubienska; Maria Duleba; Ludwik Fritsche
- Cinematography: Seweryn Steinwurzel
- Music by: Wladyslaw Dan
- Production company: Sfinks
- Distributed by: Muzafilm
- Release date: 14 September 1933
- Country: Poland
- Language: Polish

The Story of Sin (Polish: Dzieje grzechu) is a 1933 Polish drama film directed by Henryk Szaro and starring Karolina Lubienska, Maria Duleba and Ludwik Fritsche. It was shot at the Sfinks Studios in Warsaw. The film's sets were designed by the art directors Józef Galewski and Jacek Rotmil. It was based on the novel of the same title by Stefan Zeromski which was later adapted into the 1975 film The Story of Sin.

== Cast ==
- Karolina Lubienska as Ewa Pobratynska
- Dobieslaw Damiecki as Lukasz Niepolomski
- Maria Duleba as Mother Pobratynska
- Ludwik Fritsche as Father Pobratynski
- Boguslaw Samborski as Antoni Pochron
- Kazimierz Junosza-Stepowski as Plaza-Splawski
- Aleksander Zabczynski as Count Zygmunt Szczerbic
- Jan Kurnakowicz as Adolf Horst
- Józef Wegrzyn as The Fence
- Stanislaw Stanislawski as The Priest
- Jerzy Leszczynski as The Gynecologist
- Aleksander Zelwerowicz as The Surgeon
- Stefan Hnydzinski as The Squire
- Jadwiga Andrzejewska as The Florist
- Stanislaw Lapinski as Lawyer
- Pawel Owerllo as Consul in Rome
- Zbigniew Rakowiecki as Porter in a hotel in Rome
- Feliks Chmurkowski as Casino player

== Bibliography ==
- Haltof, Marek. Historical Dictionary of Polish Cinema. Rowman & Littlefield Publishers, 2015.
- Skaff, Sheila. The Law of the Looking Glass: Cinema in Poland, 1896-1939. Ohio University Press, 2008.
