= Barbara Radziwiłłówna (film) =

1936 Polish film

- Directed by: Józef Lejtes
- Written by: Anatol Stern
- Starring: Jadwiga Smosarska; Witold Zacharewicz; Leokadia Pancewiczowa; Lena Żelichowska; Jan Kurnakowicz; Helena Sulima; Zygmunt Chmielewski
- Cinematography: Seweryn Steinwurzel
- Music by: Jan Maklakiewicz
- Release date: 7 December 1936
- Running time: 96 minutes
- Country: Poland
- Language: Polish

Barbara Radziwiłłówna is a Polish historical film, a love story set in the 16th century. It was released in 1936. It was the first feature film transmitted by Polish television during its test phase (26 August 1939).

== Cast ==
- Jadwiga Smosarska – Barbara Radziwiłł
- Witold Zacharewicz – Zygmunt August
- Leokadia Pancewiczowa – queen Bona Sforza
- Lena Żelichowska – royal favourite
- Jan Kurnakowicz – stolnik Kieżgajłło
- Helena Sulimowa – Barbara Kola, Barbara's mother
- Gustaw Buszyński – Mikołaj "the Red" Radziwiłł
- Zygmunt Chmielewski – Mikołaj "the Black" Radziwiłł
- Franciszek Dominiak – Piotr Kmita, Grand Marshal of the Crown
- Stefan Hnydziński – Wirszyłł
- Jan Hajduga – astrologist
- Janusz Ziejewski – Dowoyna
- Helena Buczyńska – Barbara's aunt
- Seweryna Broniszówna – the witch
- Jerzy Chodecki – Stańczyk, the court jester
- Ludwik Fritsche – French diplomat
- Artur Kwiatkowski – Samuel Maciejowski, bishop of Chełm
- Jerzy Leszczyński – Rafał Leszczyński, starost of Radziejów and voivode of Brześć Kujawski
- Leon Łuszczewski – doctor Aliphio, chancellor of Isabella of Portugal, wife of Charles V
- Józef Maliszewski – primate Mikołaj Dzierzgowski
- Z. Protasiewicz – Bálint Bakfark, court musician
- Artur Socha – Andrzej I Górka, starost of Wielkopolska
- Ludwik Sempoliński
- Henryk Małkowski
- Michał Halicz
- Kazimierz Opaliński
- Aleksander Maniecki
