= Stanisław Łapiński =

Polish actor

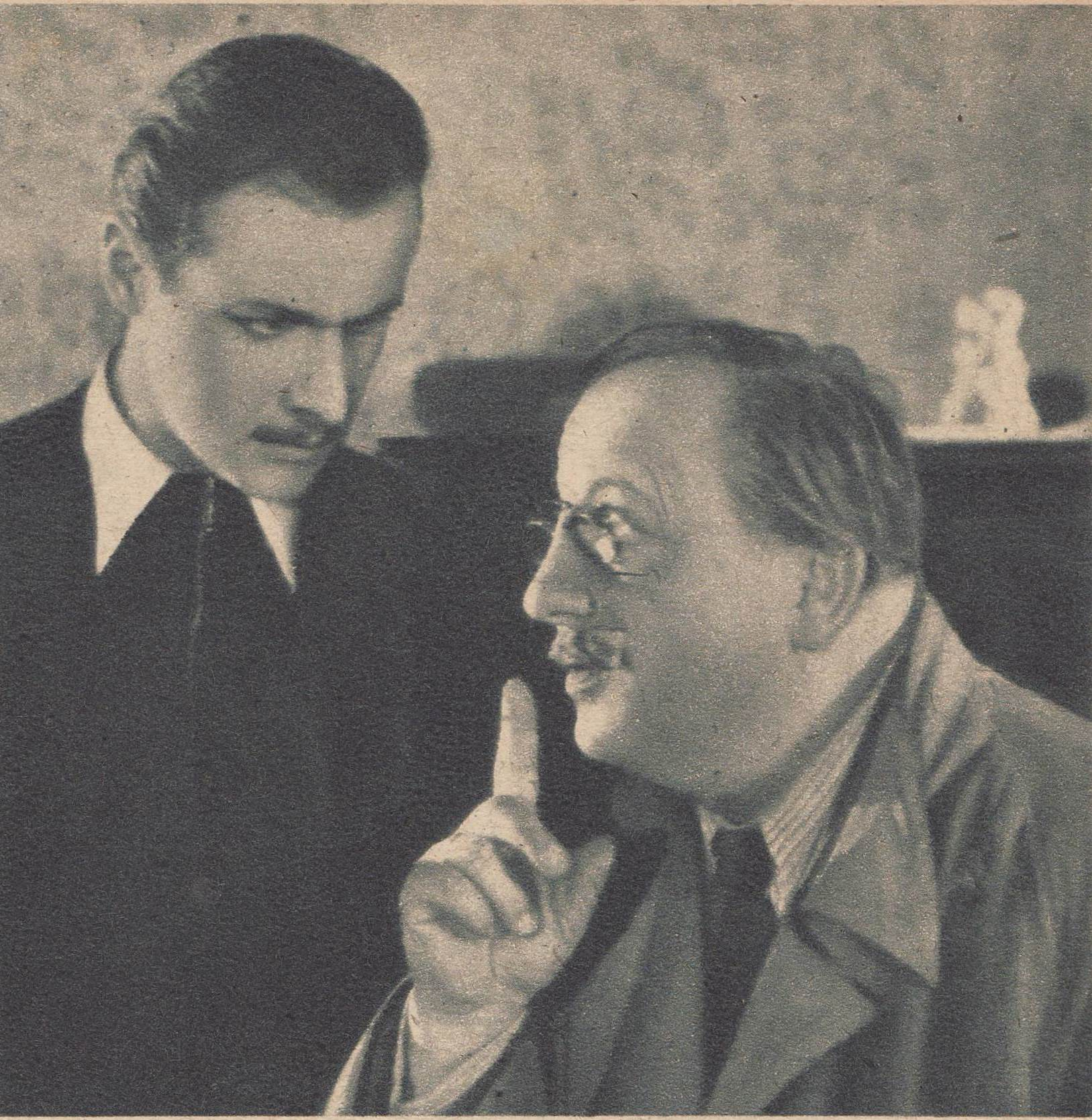
- Łapiński (right) with Jerzy Duszyński in the film Zakazane piosenki (1946)
- Born: 25 September 1895; Warsaw, Congress Poland
- Died: 26 January 1972 (aged 76); Łódź, Poland
- Occupation: Actor
- Years active: 1931–1966

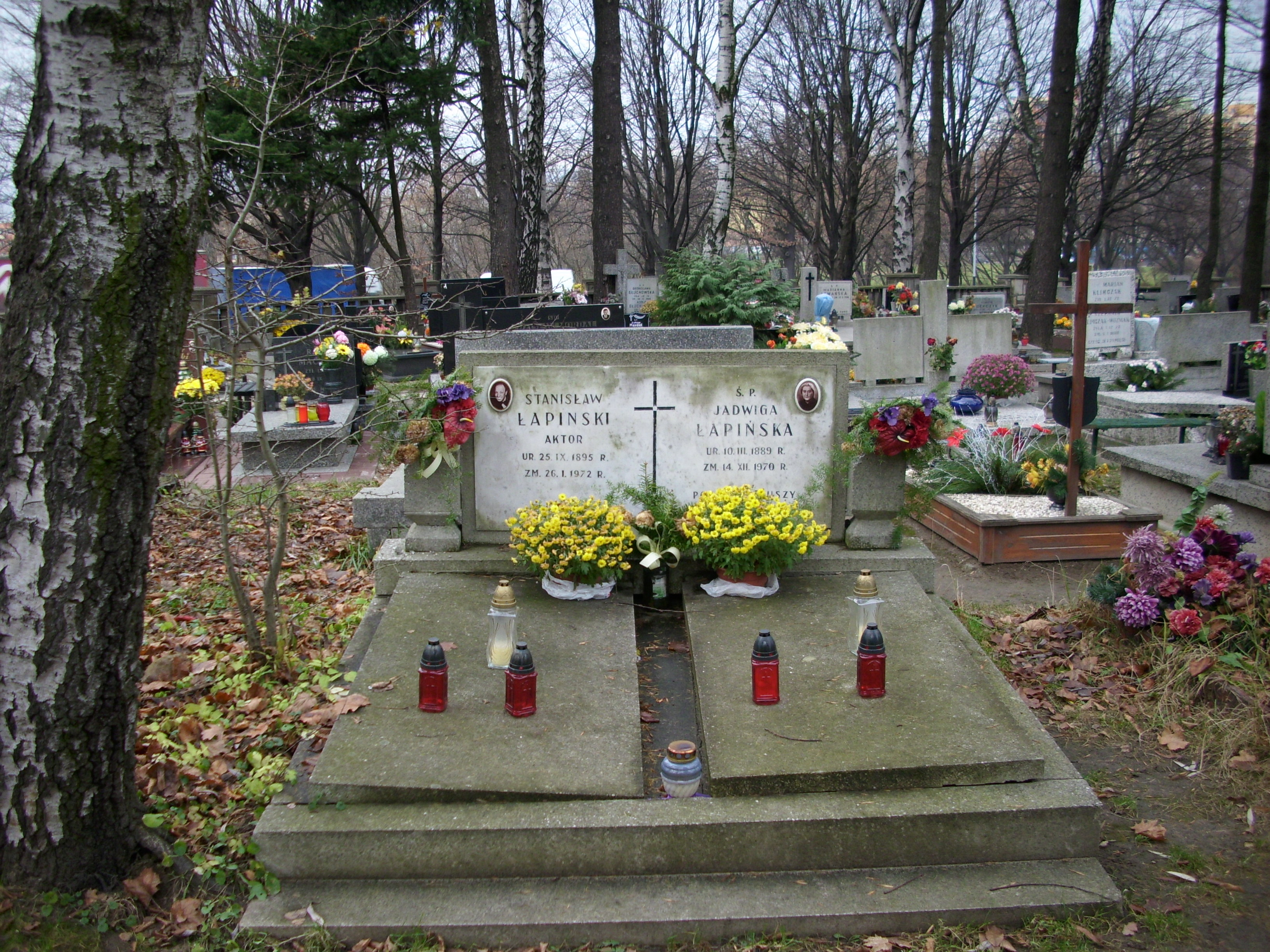
Grave of Łapiński at the Doły cemetery in Łódź

Stanisław Łapiński (25 September 1895 – 26 January 1972) was a Polish film actor. He appeared in more than 20 films between 1931 and 1966.

== Selected filmography ==
- The Ten from Pawiak Prison (1931)
- The Story of Sin (1933)
- Każdemu wolno kochać (1933)
- Pieśniarz Warszawy (1934)
- Police Chief Antek (1935)
- Róża (1936)
- At the End of the Road (1939)
- The Three Hearts (1939)
- A Matter to Settle (1953)
- Tonight a City Will Die (1961)
