= Kościuszko pod Racławicami =

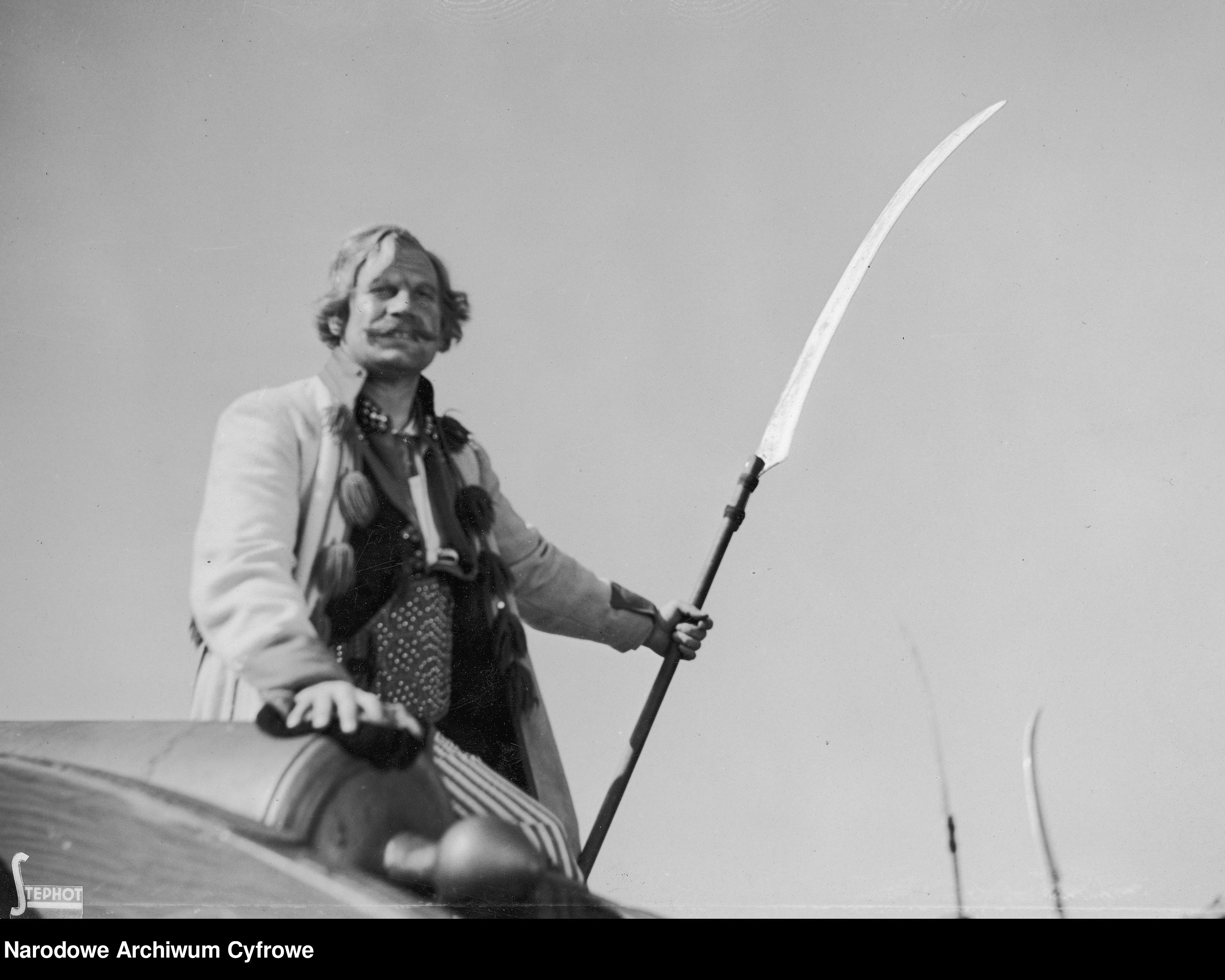
- Directed by: Józef Lejtes
- Written by: Waclaw Gasiorowski
- Starring: Tadeusz Białoszczyński; Franciszek Dominiak; Bogusław Samborski
- Music by: Jan Maklakiewicz
- Release date: 1938
- Running time: 92 minutes
- Country: Poland
- Language: Polish

Kościuszko pod Racławicami is a Polish historical film. It was released in 1938.

== Cast ==
- Tadeusz Białoszczyński – Tadeusz Kościuszko
- Franciszek Dominiak – Wojciech Głowacki
- Bogusław Samborski – brigadier Antoni Madaliński
- Józef Węgrzyn – general Józef Wodzicki
- Tadeusz Frenkiel – hetman Ożarowski
- Gustaw Buszyński – Osip Igelstrom
- Elżbieta Barszczewska – Hanka
- Witold Zacharewicz – lieutenant Jan Milewski
- Jerzy Pichelski – rotmistrz Kazimierz Brochacki
- Jan Kurnakowicz – sergeant Biedroń
