= Count Michorowski =

1937 film

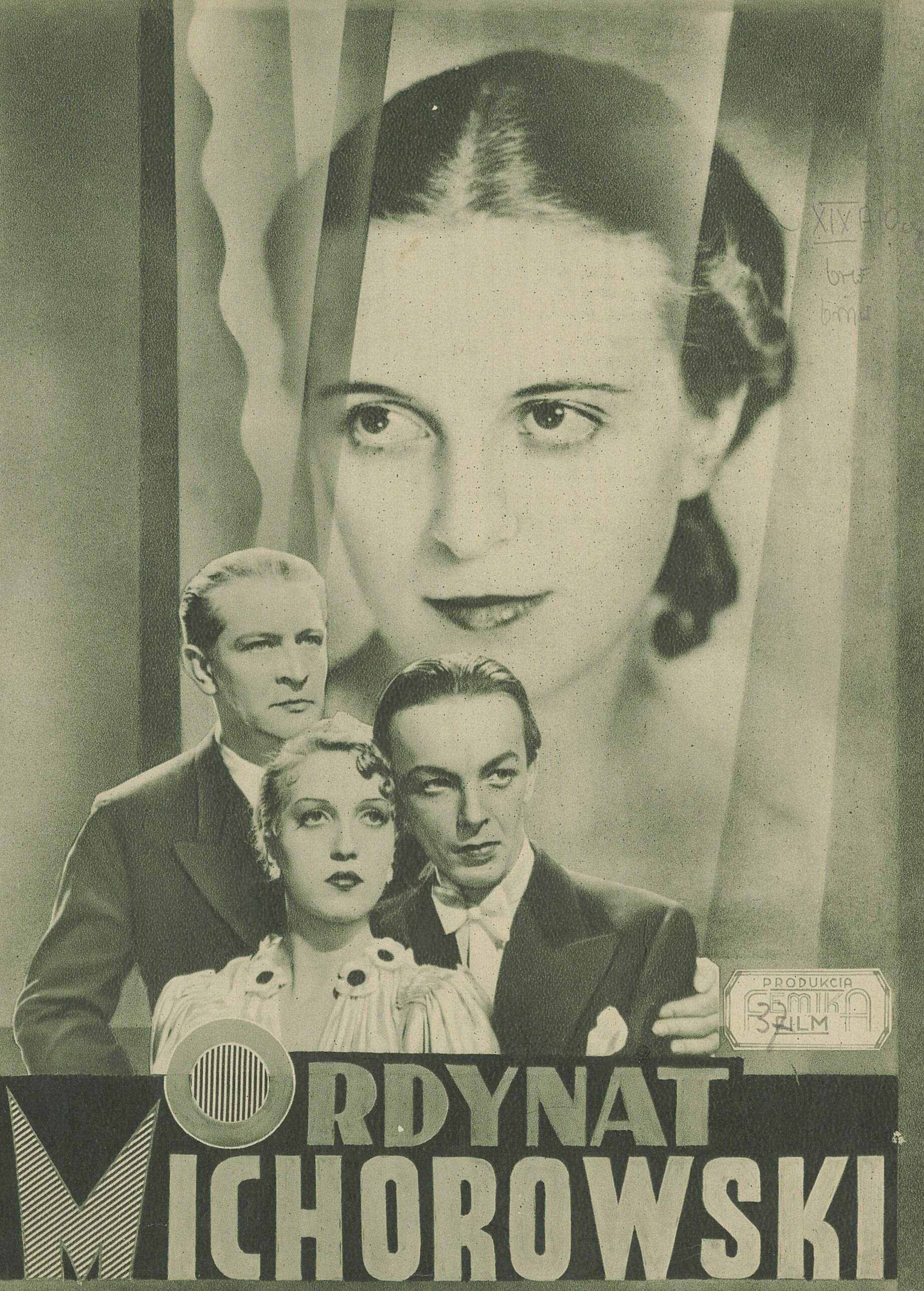
- Directed by: Henryk Szaro
- Written by: Antoni Szczerba-Ferski; Edward Puchalski; Jan Fethke
- Based on: Count Michorowski by Helena Mniszkówna
- Produced by: Wladyslaw Mikosz
- Starring: Franciszek Brodniewicz; Tamara Wiszniewska; Mieczyslawa Cwiklinska
- Cinematography: Seweryn Steinwurzel
- Music by: Henry Vars
- Production company: Femika Film
- Distributed by: Europa Film
- Release date: 20 March 1937
- Running time: 77 minutes
- Country: Poland
- Language: Polish

Count Michorowski (Polish: Ordynat Michorowski) is a 1937 Polish romantic drama film directed by Henryk Szaro and starring Franciszek Brodniewicz, Tamara Wiszniewska and Mieczyslawa Cwiklinska. It was shot at the Sfinks Studios in Warsaw. The film's sets were designed by the art directors Stefan Norris and Jacek Rotmil.

== Cast ==
- Franciszek Brodniewicz as Duke Waldemar Michorowski
- Tamara Wiszniewska as Lucia Elzonowska
- Wojciech Wojtecki as Count Bohdan Michorowoski
- Mieczyslawa Cwiklinska as Baroness Idalia Elzonowska
- Wladyslaw Grabowski as Count Trestka
- Leon Luszczewski as Brochwicz
- Antoni Szczerba-Ferski as Count Wojciech Michorowski
- Ludwik Fritsche as Antoni, the Baroness' majordomo
- Zygmunt Chmielewski as Count Barski
- Kazimierz Junosza-Stepowski as Duke Maciej Michorowski
- Zofia Lindorf as Rita Trestka
- Józef Zejdowski as Attending Physician
- Janina Federowiczowa as Mary Thompson, American woman

== Bibliography ==
- Hoberman, Jim. Bridge of Light: Yiddish Film Between Two Worlds. Dartmouth College, 2010.
- Nowell-Smith, Geoffrey. The Oxford History of World Cinema. Oxford University Press, 1996.
- Skaff, Sheila. The Law of the Looking Glass: Cinema in Poland, 1896-1939. Ohio University Press, 2008.
