= Irena Malkiewicz =

Polish actress

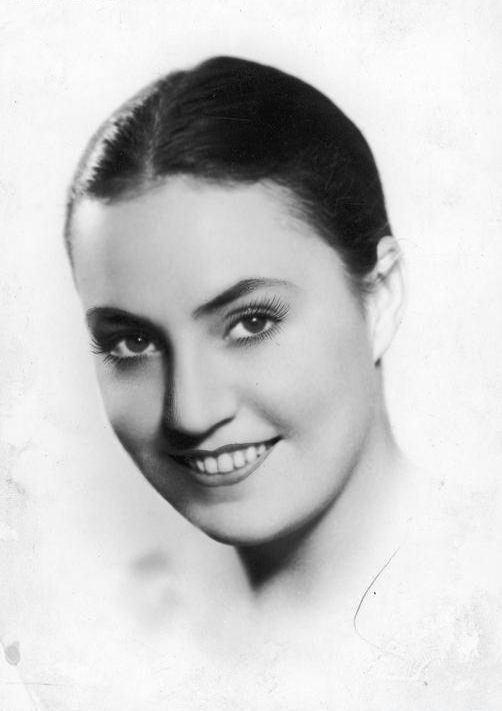
- Born: 15 September 1911; Moscow, Russian Empire (now Russia)
- Died: 23 January 2004 (aged 92); Warsaw, Poland
- Occupation: Actress
- Years active: 1936–1988

Irena Malkiewicz (15 September 1911 – 23 January 2004) was a Polish actress. She appeared in more than 30 films and television shows between 1936 and 1988.

== Selected filmography ==
- The Leper (1936)
- At the End of the Road (1939)
- Serce matki (1939)
- To Happiness Through Tears (1941)
- Lotna (1959)
- Passenger (1963)
