= To Happiness Through Tears =

1941 film

- Directed by: Jan Fethke
- Written by: Jan Fethke
- Produced by: Mikolaj Iwanow
- Starring: Irena Malkiewicz; Franciszek Brodniewicz; Mieczyslawa Cwiklinska
- Cinematography: Jerzy Sten
- Music by: Zygmunt Wiehler
- Production company: Tempo Film
- Release date: 31 January 1941
- Running time: 85 minutes
- Country: Poland
- Language: Polish

To Happiness Through Tears (Polish: Przez lzy do szczescia) is a 1941 Polish romantic drama film directed by Jan Fethke and starring Irena Malkiewicz, Franciszek Brodniewicz and Mieczyslawa Cwiklinska. The film's sets were designed by the art director Stefan Norris. It was filmed during the Second Polish Republic but not released until 1941 when Poland was then under German and Soviet occupation.

== Cast ==
- Irena Malkiewicz as Lena Merwinska
- Franciszek Brodniewicz as Jan Monkiewicz
- Mieczyslawa Cwiklinska as Lena's secretary
- Józef Orwid as Redaktor Czaputkiewicz
- Tamara Wiszniewska as Miss Anusia
- Stanislaw Grolicki as Prof. Dobrzynski
- Maria Buchwald as Cook
- Jerzy Kobusz as Kwapiszewski
- Maria Zabczynska as Kierowniczka domu sierot
- Henryk Malkowski as Doctor
- Aleksander Bogusinski as Doktor Rudzki
- Zygmunt Chmielewski as Impresario
- Iwonka de Petry as Child
- Marysia Zarebinska as Child
- Lilka Skrzypkówna as Child
- Maria Broniewska as Wisia
- Stanislaw Sielanski as Feliks, driver

== Bibliography ==
- Skaff, Sheila. The Law of the Looking Glass: Cinema in Poland, 1896-1939. Ohio University Press, 2008.
- Skopal, Pavel & Winkel, Roel Vande. (ed.) Film Professionals in Nazi-Occupied Europe: Mediation Between the National-Socialist Cultural 'New Order' and Local Structures. Springer International Publishing, 2021.
