= The Orchestra Conductor =

1980 film

- Directed by: Andrzej Wajda
- Written by: Andrzej Kijowski
- Starring: John Gielgud
- Cinematography: Sławomir Idziak
- Edited by: Halina Prugar-Ketling
- Release date: 24 March 1980
- Running time: 101 minutes
- Country: Poland
- Languages: Polish; English

The Orchestra Conductor (Polish: Dyrygent, and also known as The Conductor) is a 1980 Polish drama film directed by Andrzej Wajda. It was entered into the 30th Berlin International Film Festival, where Andrzej Seweryn won the Silver Bear for Best Actor. It was also shown at the 1980 New York Film Festival.

== Cast ==
- John Gielgud - John Lasocki
- Krystyna Janda - Marta
- Andrzej Seweryn - Adam Pietryk
- Jan Ciecierski - Marta's Father
- Maria Seweryn - Marysia
- Józef Fryzlewicz - Governor
- Janusz Gajos - High Official
- Mary Ann Krasinski - Marta's Friend
- Anna Lopatowska - Anna
- Mavis Walker - Lilian
- Tadeusz Czechowski - Tadzio
- Marek Dabrowski - Official
- Stanislaw Górka - Bass Player
- Wojciech Wysocki - Kwiatkowski
- Stanislaw Zatloka - Rysio
- Andréa Ferréol
- Jerzy Kleyn
- Elzbieta Strzalkowska
- Jerzy Szmidt
