= Obrona Częstochowy =

- Directed by: Edward Puchalski
- Written by: Edmund Michrowski (screenplay); Henryk Sienkiewicz (novel)
- Release date: 1913
- Country: Poland

Obrona Częstochowy is a 1913 Polish historical film. It is based on a novel by Henryk Sienkiewicz.

== Cast ==
- Maria Dulęba as Oleńka Billewiczówna
- Aleksander Zelwerowicz as Jan Onufry Zagłoba
- Stefan Jaracz as Michał Wołodyjowski
- Bronisław Oranowski as Andrzej Kmicic
- Lucjan Wiśniewski as Jan Skrzetuski
- Kazimierz Wojciechowski as Jan Skrzetuski
- Seweryna Broniszówna as Anna Borzobochata
