= Camilla Eibenschütz =

German actress (1884–1958)

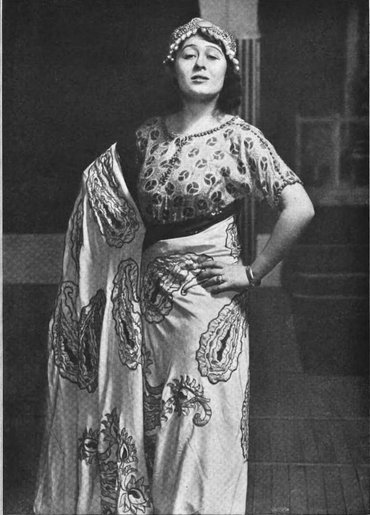
Camilla Eibenschütz in costume as "Sumurun", from a 1912 publication.

Camilla Eibenschütz (July 20, 1884 – July 12, 1958) was a German stage actress.

== Early life ==
Camille Eibenschütz was from Bavaria, the daughter of pianist and music professor Albert Eibenschütz and Anna Theresa Rosa Knorr. Hungarian pianist Ilona Eibenschütz was her father's cousin.

== Career ==
Camilla Eibenschütz was the first actress to play "Wendla" in Frank Wedekind's controversial Frühlings Erwachen (Spring Awakening) in Berlin in 1906. In 1907 she played Juliet in Max Reinhardt's Romeo and Juliet, opposite Alexander Moissi. She also played Ophelia, Viola, and Titania in Reinhardt's Shakespeare productions. Albert von Keller painted her as Myrrhine in Lysistrata in 1909. On Broadway, she starred in Reinhardt's pantomime Sumurun in 1912, with Leopoldine Konstantin, Emil Lind, and other European actors. She was in Blue Bird in Berlin in 1912, and in The Yellow Jacket in Berlin in 1914.

Eibenschütz was known as a collector of art, to decorate her two residences, a country home at Bogensberglehen and a villa at Dahlem.

== Personal life ==
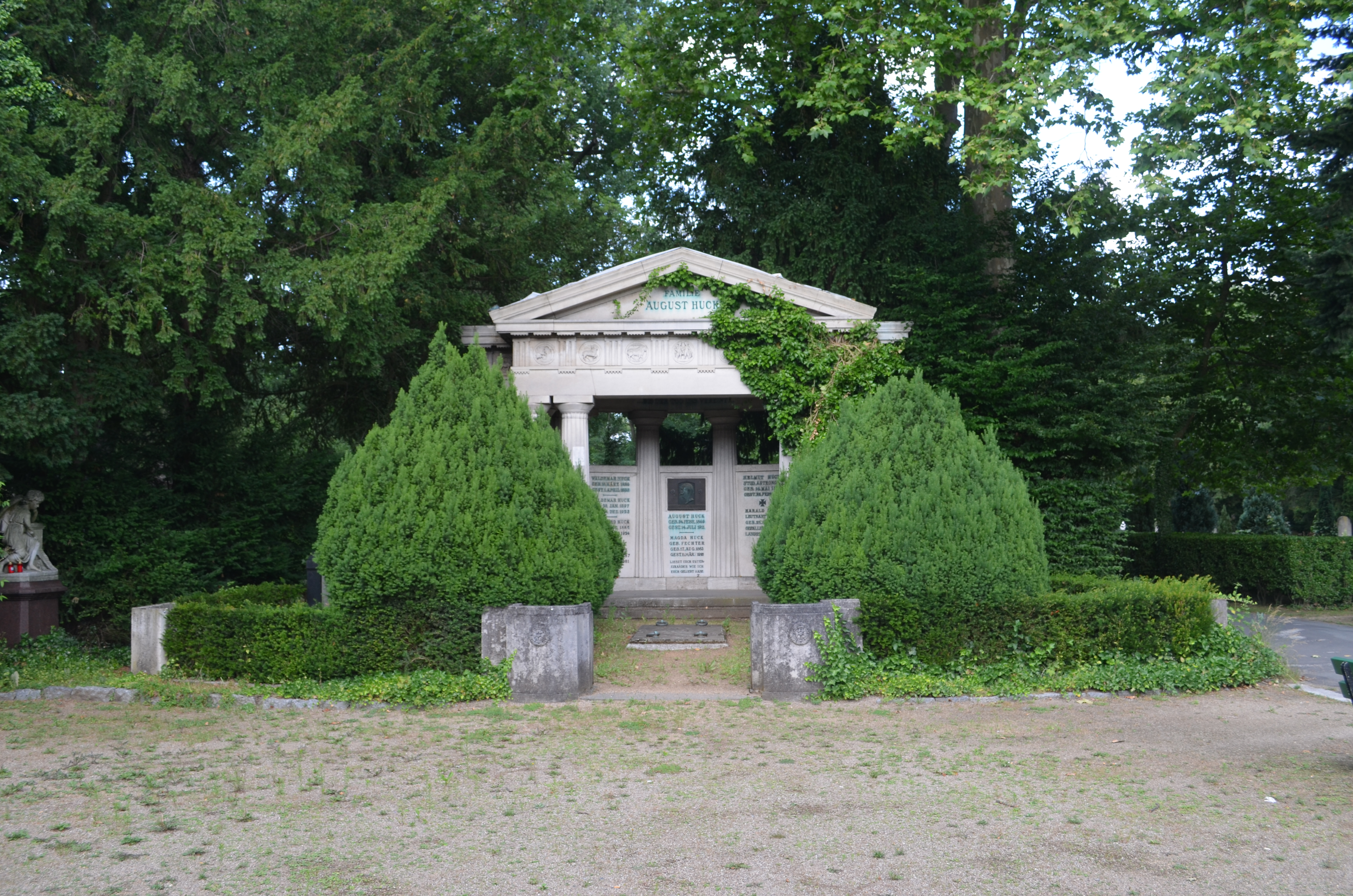
Offenbach, Alter Friedhof, Grab August Huck

Camilla Eibenschütz married twice; first, briefly, to Polish dramatist Ryszard Ordynski in 1913, and later to newspaper publisher Dr. Wolfgang Huck (1889–1966). They had a son, Andreas Michael Huck (born 1919). She died in 1958, aged 75 years. Her grave is in Offenbach am Main, with other members of the Huck family.
