= Jan Ciecierski =

Polish actor (1899–1987)

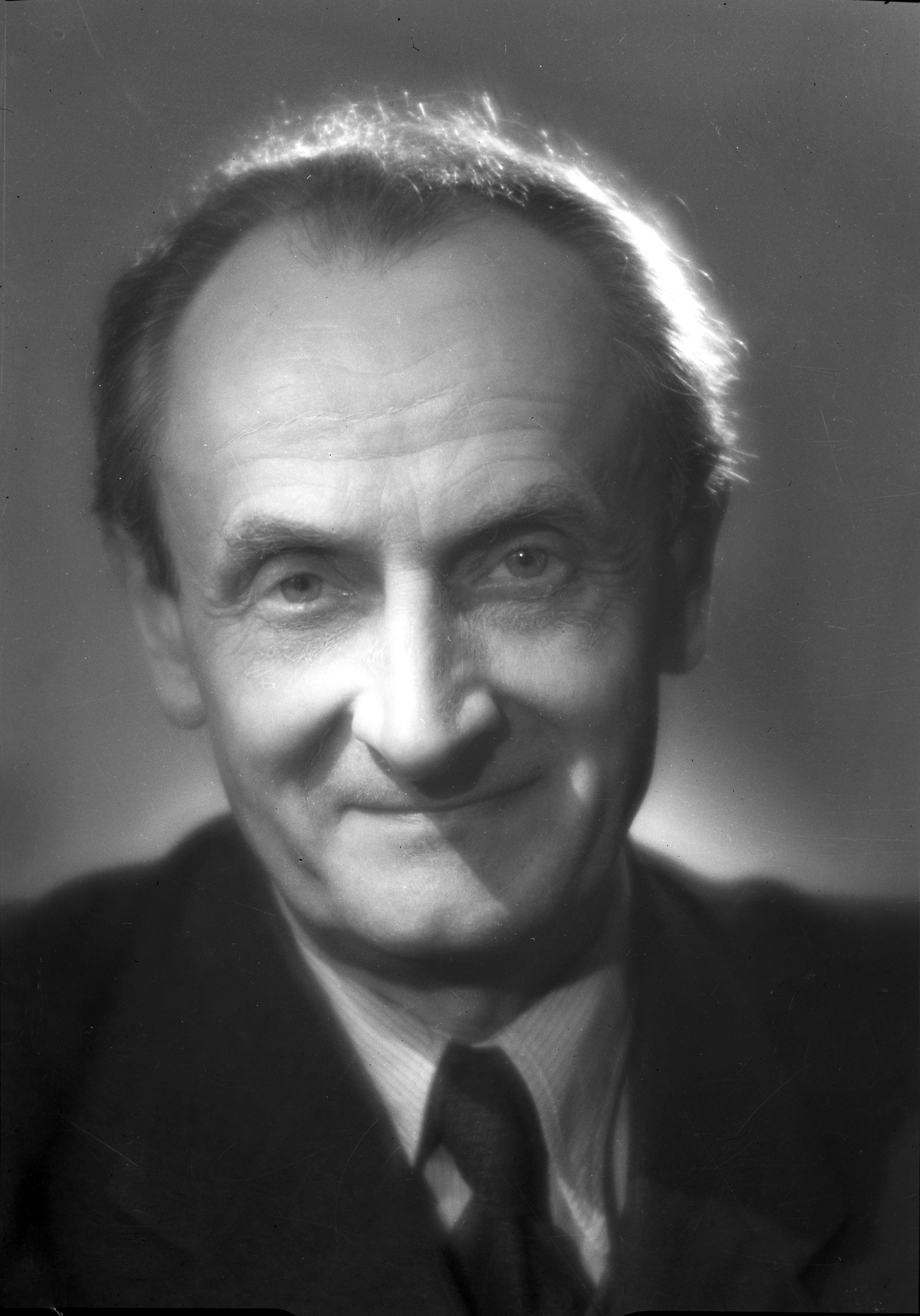
- Born: 8 March 1899; Warsaw, Russian Empire (now Warsaw, Poland)
- Died: 20 February 1987 (aged 87); Warsaw, Poland
- Occupation: Actor
- Years active: 1938–1981

Jan Ciecierski (8 March 1899 – 20 February 1987) was a Polish actor. He appeared in more than 35 films and television shows between 1938 and 1981.

== Selected filmography ==
- The Line (1938)
- Warsaw Premiere (1951)
- Ashes and Diamonds (1958)
- Samson (1961)
- The Orchestra Conductor (1980)
