= The Ten from Pawiak Prison =

1931 film

- Directed by: Ryszard Ordyński
- Written by: Ferdynand Goetel
- Based on: Book by Jan Jur-Gorzechowski
- Produced by: Mieczyslaw Krawicz
- Starring: Józef Wegrzyn; Karolina Lubienska; Adam Brodzisz
- Cinematography: Zbigniew Gniazdowski
- Edited by: Zbigniew Gniazdowski
- Music by: Wladyslaw Dan; Feliks Rybicki
- Production company: Blok-Muzafilm
- Distributed by: Muzafilm
- Release date: 19 September 1931
- Running time: 94 minutes
- Country: Poland
- Language: Polish

The Ten from Pawiak Prison (Polish: Dziesieciu z Pawiaka) is a 1931 Polish thriller film directed by Ryszard Ordyński and starring Józef Wegrzyn, Karolina Lubienska and Adam Brodzisz. It was shot at the Falanga Studios in Warsaw and on location around the city included Łazienki Park, Młociny and the Royal Castle. The film's sets were designed by the art director Józef Galewski. It was based on a book by Jan Jur-Gorzechowski recounting the real-life events of 1906.

== Synopsis ==
In 1906 during the unrest in Russian-ruled Poland, ten prisoners held by the Imperial authorities in Warsaw are sentenced to be executed. The Polish underground movement launches a plan to rescue them from Pawiak prison.

== Cast ==
- Józef Wegrzyn as Jur
- Karolina Lubienska as Hania
- Adam Brodzisz as Janusz Dunin
- Boguslaw Samborski as General Maksimow
- Zofia Batycka as Olga Michajlowna
- Kazimierz Justian as Symon, agitator
- Franciszek Dominiak as Gendarme Col. Zienkow
- Tadeusz Kanski as Warden
- Maria Korska as Starsza rewolucjonistka w bibliotece
- Antoni Bednarczyk as Dyzurny w wiezieniu
- Roman Deren as Policeman
- Michal Halicz as Rewolucjonista z wasami
- Jerzy Kobusz as Rewolucjonista
- Stanislaw Lapinski as Judge
- Ryszard Misiewicz as Lysy Aptekarz
- Stefan Rogulski as Brat skazanca
- Artur Socha as Delegat z Krakowa
- Ludwik Fritsche as Lawyer
- Antoni Piekarski as Policeman
- Henryk Rzetkowski as Zandarm z broda
- Leon Rechenski as Officer w gabinecie generala
- Józef Maliszewski as Skazaniec
- Wladyslaw Neubelt as Przewodniczacy sadu
- Mieczyslaw Winkler as Chaim

== Bibliography ==
- Haltof, Marek. Polish National Cinema. Berghahn Books, 2002.
- Skaff, Sheila. The Law of the Looking Glass: Cinema in Poland, 1896-1939. Ohio University Press, 2008.
