= Karolina Lubienska =

Polish actress

Karolina Lubieńska
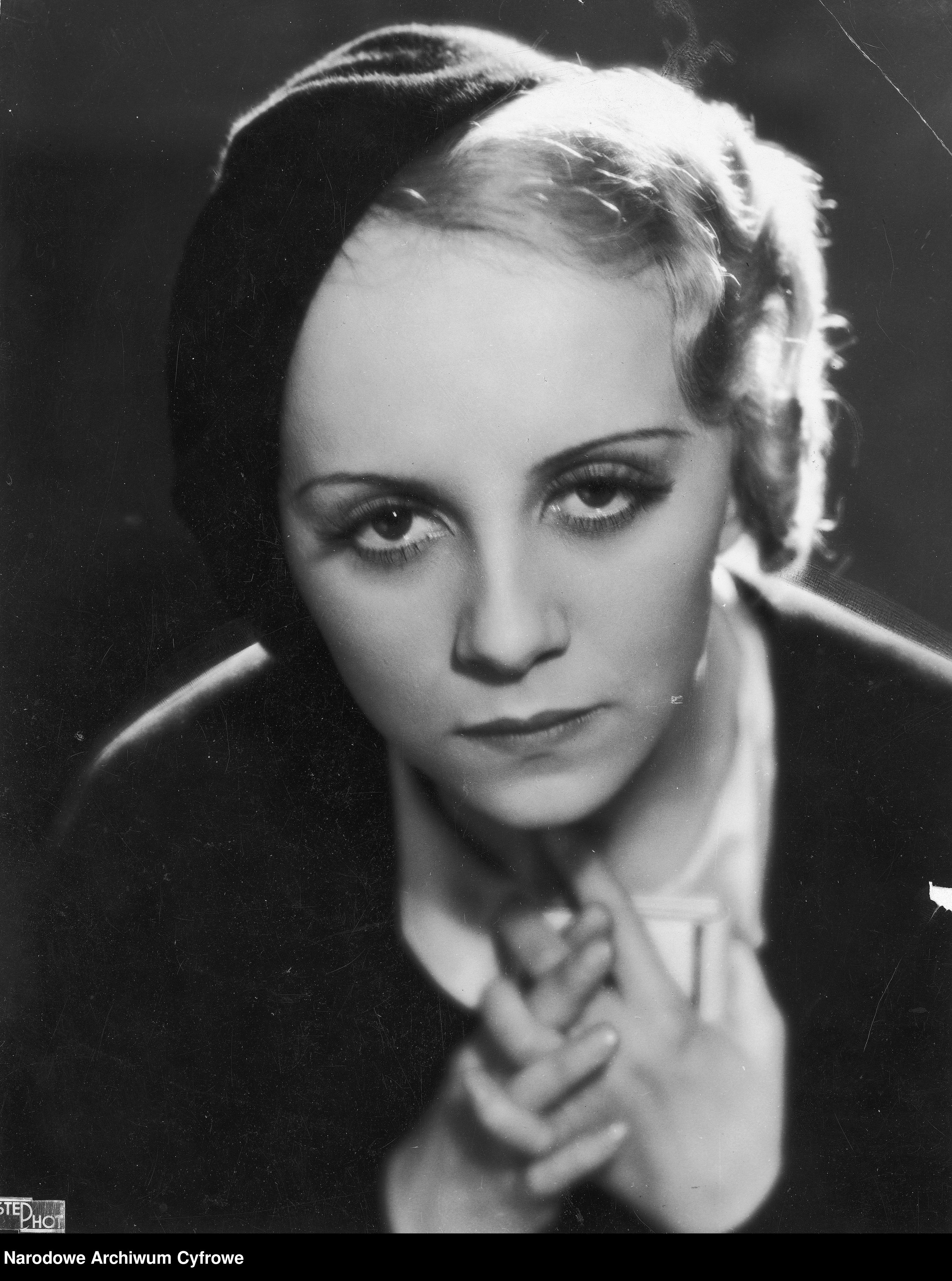
- Born: 30 October 1906; Berlin, German Empire
- Died: April 25, 1991 (aged 84); Warsaw, Poland
- Occupation: Actress
- Years active: 1931–1975 (film)

Karolina Lubieńska (30 October 1906 – 25 April 1991) was a Polish film and theatre actress. She was known for her roles on stage, particularly at the National Theatre in Warsaw. During the Second Republic she played the female lead in several films such as The Palace on Wheels (1932). She featured in the lead role in the 1933 film The Story of Sin and then played the same character's mother in the 1975 film remake.

== Selected filmography ==
- The Ten from Pawiak Prison (1931)
- The Palace on Wheels (1932)
- The Story of Sin (1933)
- Fredek uszczesliwia swiat (1936)
- Ksiazatko (1937)
- The Story of Sin (1975)

== Bibliography ==
- Ford, Charles & Hammond, Robert. Polish Film: A Twentieth Century History. McFarland, 2005.
- Cuelenaere, Eduard, Willems, Gertjan & Joye, Stijn (ed.) European Film Remakes. Edinburgh University Press, 2021.
