= Lena Żelichowska =

Polish actress (1910–1958)

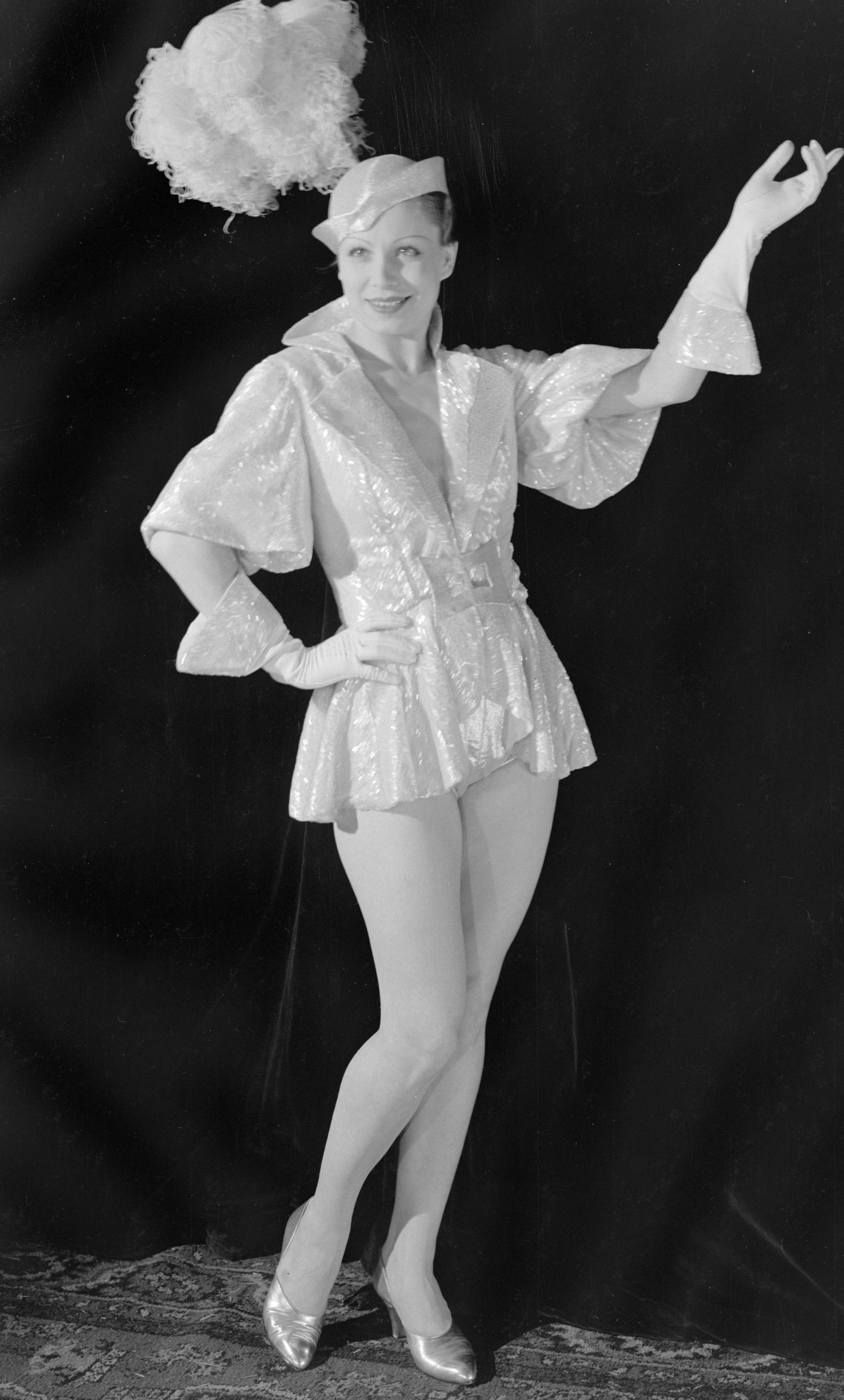
- Lena Żelichowska in 1934
- Born: Helena Żelichowska; 28 August 1910; Warsaw, Congress Poland
- Died: 28 August 1958 (aged 48); San Francisco, California, United States
- Occupations: Actress, dancer
- Years active: 1926–1939

Lena Żelichowska (12 August 1910 – 28 August 1958) was a Polish stage and film actress. She appeared in fourteen films between 1933 and 1940.

== Selected filmography ==
- Black Pearl (1934)
- Róża (1936)
- Barbara Radziwiłłówna (1936)
- A Diplomatic Wife (1937)
- The Line (1938)
