= Zygmunt Chmielewski =

Polish actor

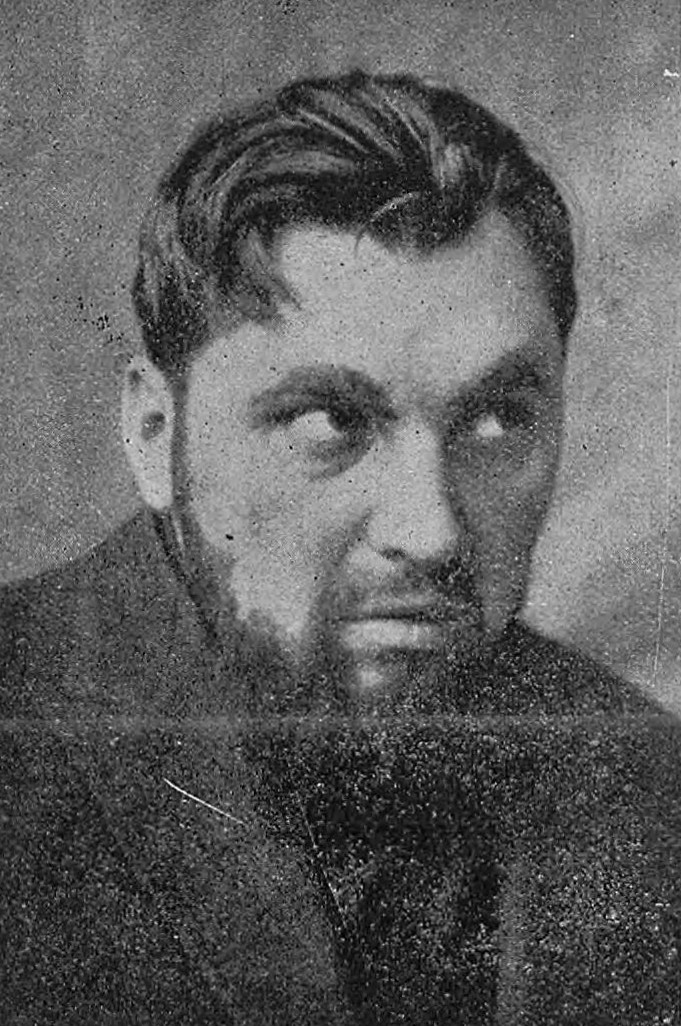
- Born: 16 May 1894; Odessa, Russian Empire (now Ukraine)
- Died: 26 May 1978 (aged 84); Warsaw, Poland
- Occupation: Actor
- Years active: 1921-1960
- Spouse: Stanisława Perzanowska

Zygmunt Chmielewski (16 May 1894 – 26 May 1978) was a Polish film actor. He appeared in 35 films between 1921 and 1960.

== Selected filmography ==
- His Excellency, The Shop Assistant (1933)
- Is Lucyna a Girl? (1934)
- Córka generała Pankratowa (1934)
- Barbara Radziwiłłówna (1936)
- Pan Twardowski (1936)
- The Leper (1936)
- Wierna rzeka (1936)
- Count Michorowski (1937)
- To Happiness Through Tears (1941)
- Nikodem Dyzma (1956)
- Kapelusz pana Anatola (1957)
- Inspekcja pana Anatola (1959)
