= The Rose of Blood =

1917 film directed by J. Gordon Edwards

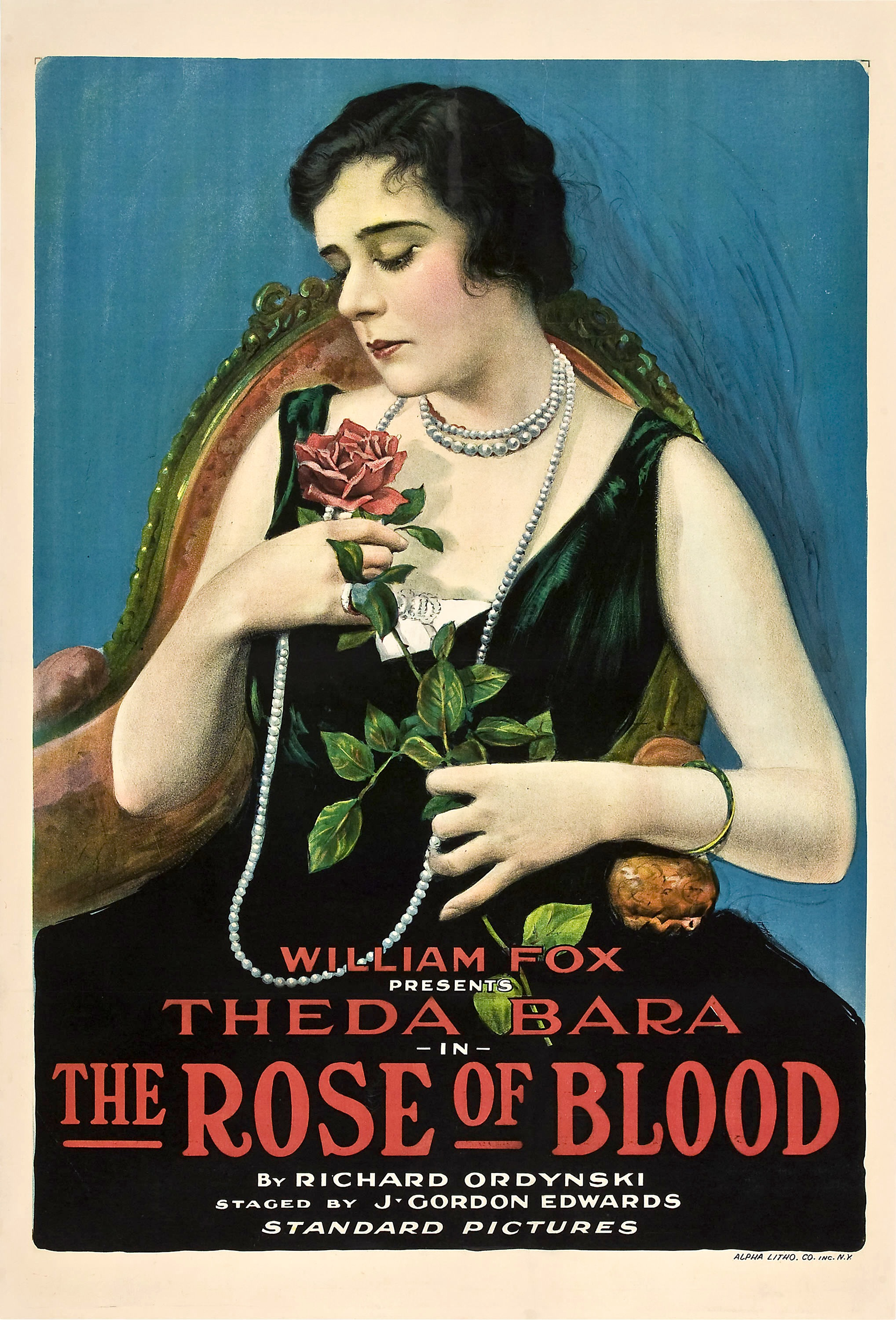
- Film poster (1917)
- Directed by: J. Gordon Edwards
- Written by: Bernard McConville
- Story by: Ryszard Ordynski
- Produced by: William Fox
- Starring: Theda Bara; Genevieve Blinn; Charles Clary
- Cinematography: John W. Boyle; Rial Schellinger
- Distributed by: Fox Film Corporation
- Release date: November 4, 1917
- Running time: 5 reels
- Country: United States
- Language: Silent (English intertitles)

The Rose of Blood is a 1917 American silent drama film directed by J. Gordon Edwards and starring Theda Bara. Based on the story "The Red Rose" (Polish: Czerwona róża) by Ryszard Ordynski, the film was written by Bernard McConville. The Rose of Blood is now considered to be a lost film.

== Cast ==
- Theda Bara as Lisza Tapenka
- Genevieve Blinn as Governess
- Charles Clary as Prince Arbassoff
- Marie Kiernan as Kosyla
- Joe King as Prime Minister
- Herschel Mayall as Koliensky
- Ryszard Ordynski as Vassea
- Hector Sarno as Revolutionist
- Bert Turner as Princess Arbassoff

== Reception ==
Like many American films of the time, The Rose of Blood was subject to cuts by city and state film censorship boards. For example, the Chicago Board of Censors cut in Reel 2 two scenes of a young man holding a bomb and the throwing of it and the intertitle "They still live, but next time", in Reel 5, the intertitle "Nothing less than death", in Reel 6, scenes of the shooting of the general and the servant doping the wine, and in Reel 7, five riot scenes including a soldier killing a young man and a soldier clubbing an old woman, the intertitle "When are you going to pay me?", two scenes of women taking bombs from a chest, and the lighting of the fuse.

== See also ==
- List of lost films
- 1937 Fox vault fire
