= Kabaret Wagabunda =

Wagabunda (Polish for vagabond) was a Polish satirical theatre (cabaret (Note: in post-war Poland meaning: a mixture of sketches, monologues, stand up comedy, songs and sung poetry, with addition of political satire - hidden behind double entendre to fool censors; pre-war revue shows were long gone)) from 1956 to 1968, created by actress Lidia Wysocka (its stage director, creative director and performer) and Karol Szpalski.

True to its name it didn't have own stage, being forever on tour, not only all over Poland, but also visiting Polonia centers in the United States (Note: first artist troupe from Iron Curtain-blocked Poland to reach the United States - on 1957 tour) and Canada (1957, 1962, 1964), United Kingdom (1965, 1966), Israel (1963), USSR (1968) and Czechoslovakia (1956). 1500 performances by January 1963, in total over 2 million tickets sold, according to its executive manager, Wojciech Furman.

The ever-changing troupe (with the exception of Lidia Wysocka and singer Maria Koterbska) consisted of popular actors, singers and satirists, notably Kazimierz Rudzki (as the compère), Edward Dziewoński, Wiesław Michnikowski, Bogumił Kobiela, Jacek Fedorowicz, Jeremi Przybora, Marian Załucki, Tadeusz Chyła, Janusz Osęka, Mieczysław Czechowicz, Adolf Dymsza, Zdzisław Leśniak, Mieczysław Wojnicki, Mariusz Gorczyński, Jan Świąć, Mieczysław Friedel, Andrzej Tomecki, Stanisław Wyszyński, Jerzy Złotnicki and Zbigniew Cybulski.

Some performances were recorded by Polska Kronika Filmowa, Polskie Radio and Telewizja Polska.
