= Grażyna Długołęcka =

Polish film actress (born 1951)

Grażyna Długołęcka (born 25 August 1951 in Łódź) is a Polish film actress. She is best known for her performance as Ewa Pobratynska in The Story of Sin.
