= Jerzy Leszczyński (actor) =

Polish actor

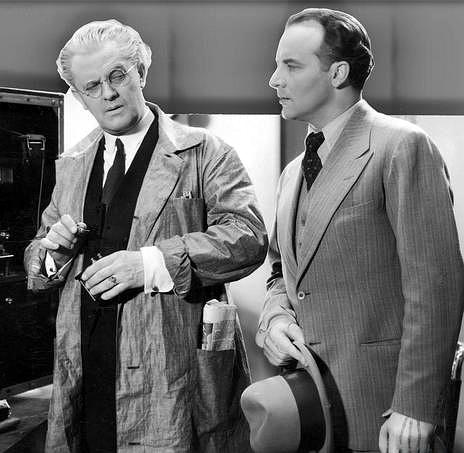
- Jerzy Leszczyński (left) with Igo Sym, from Spy With a Mask (1933)
- Born: 6 February 1884; Warsaw, Poland, Russian Empire
- Died: 9 July 1959 (aged 75); Warsaw, Poland
- Occupation: Actor
- Years active: 1911-1948 (film)

Jerzy Leszczyński (1884–1959) was a Polish stage actor and film actor. Both his parents, Bolesław Leszczyński and Honorata Leszczyńska, were noted stage actors of the nineteenth century in Poland.

He was married to the actresses Leokadia Pancewiczowa and Anna Belina (1884-1974).

== Selected filmography ==
- Pan Tadeusz (1928)
- The Story of Sin (1933)
- Barbara Radziwiłłówna (1936)
- Wierna rzeka (1936)
- Halka (1937)
- Border Street (1948)

== Bibliography ==
- Marek Haltof. Polish Film and the Holocaust: Politics and Memory. Berghahn Books, 2012.
