= Ryszard Ordyński =

Polish film director

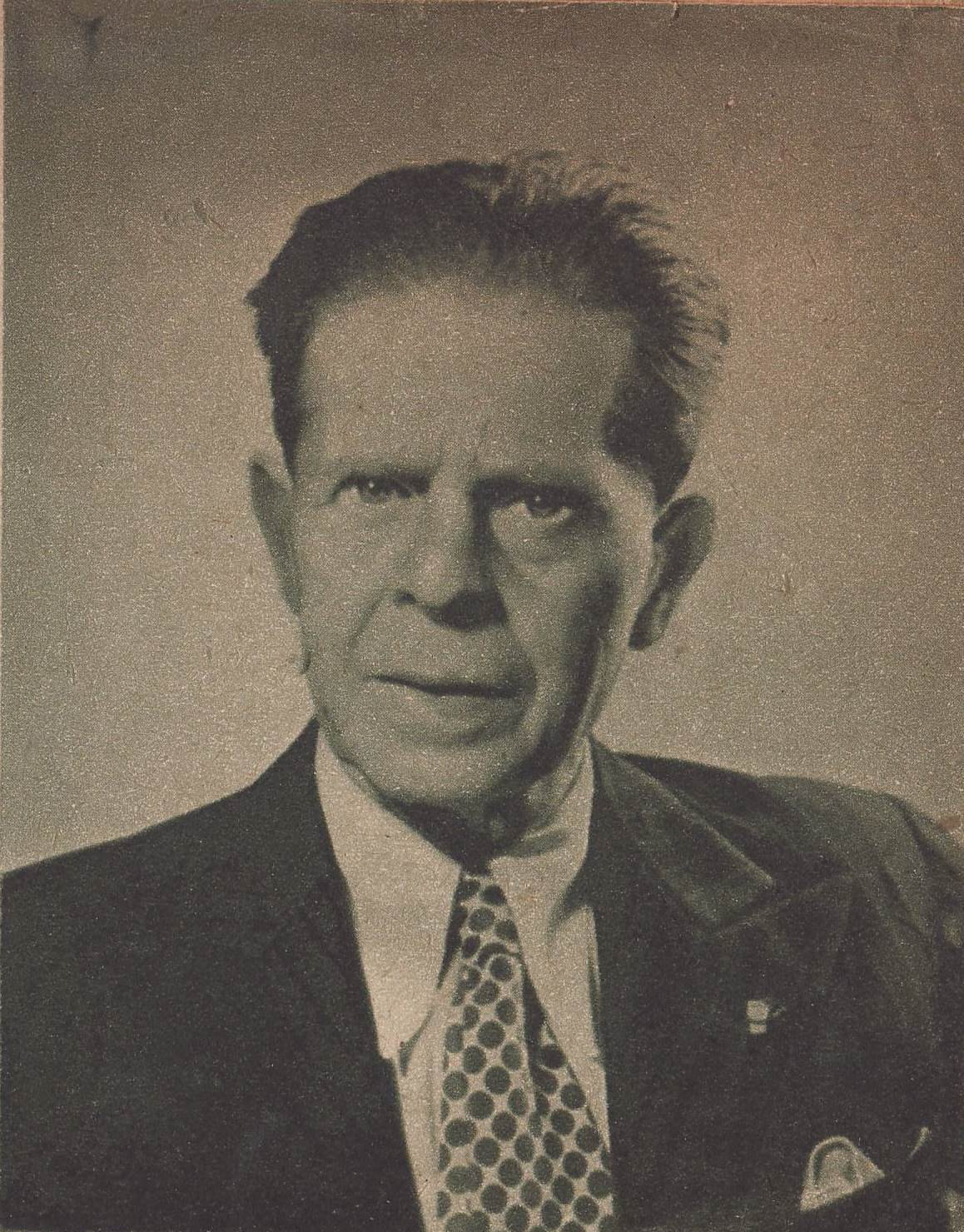
- Ordyński in 1946
- Born: Dawid Blumenfeld; 5 October 1878; Maków Podhalanski, Galicia, Austro-Hungarian Empire
- Died: 13 August 1953 (aged 74); Warsaw, Poland
- Occupations: theatre and film director actor, writer

Ryszard Ordyński (October 5, 1878 – August 13, 1953) was a Polish actor, writer and theatre and film director.

== Biography ==
Ryszard Ordyński was born in Maków Podhalański as Dawid Blumenfeld to Ignacy Blumenfeld-Ordyński, a senior railway official and Emilia Blumenfeld, née Herlinger. He spent his childhood and youth in Kraków, where he studied at the Jagiellonian University, Faculty of Philosophy. In 1900 he changed his name to Ryszard Stanisław Kazimierz Ordyński.

He spent many years outside his native country. In Berlin he worked with Max Reinhardt at the Deutsches Theater. During the Second Polish Republic he was a noted director. Of Polish background, he left for Paris in 1937 and then following the German invasion of France he went to Hollywood. In 1947 he returned to Poland.

His first wife (1903 – 1910 or 1911) was Julia Stefania, née Stadnik, a painter. Hist second wife was the German actress Camilla Eibenschütz (1913, for a brief time). The only known about his third wife is that she was possibly an American and they had a daughter. The fourth wife (1941) was Anna née Steckiewicz, who died in 1970.

== Selected filmography ==
- The Rose of Blood (1917)
- Pan Tadeusz (1928)
- Janko muzykant (1930)
- The Ten from Pawiak Prison (1931)
- The Palace on Wheels (1932)
- The Banner of Freedom (1935)
- American Adventure (1936)

== Bibliography ==
- Haltof, Marek (2007). Historical Dictionary of Polish Cinema. Historical Dictionaries of Literature and the Arts, No. 19. Lanham, MD: Scarecrow Press. ISBN 978-0-8108-5566-3.
- Prykowska-Michalak, Karolina (2025). "Migration and Exclusion: Ryszard Ordyński—A Theatre 'Vagabond'". In Szymanski-Düll, Berenika; Skwirblies, Lisa (eds.). European Theatre Migrants in the Age of Empire: Personal Experiences, Transnational Trajectories, and Socio-Political Impacts. Palgrave Studies in Performance and Migration (eBook). Springer Nature/Palgrave Macmillan. doi:10.1007/978-3-031-69836-1. ISBN 978-3-031-69836-1.
