= Feliks Chmurkowski =

Polish actor (1896–1971)

- Born: 18 May 1896; Warsaw, Poland, Russian Empire (now Warsaw, Poland)
- Died: 16 April 1971 (aged 74); Warsaw, Poland
- Occupation: Actor
- Years active: 1933-1971

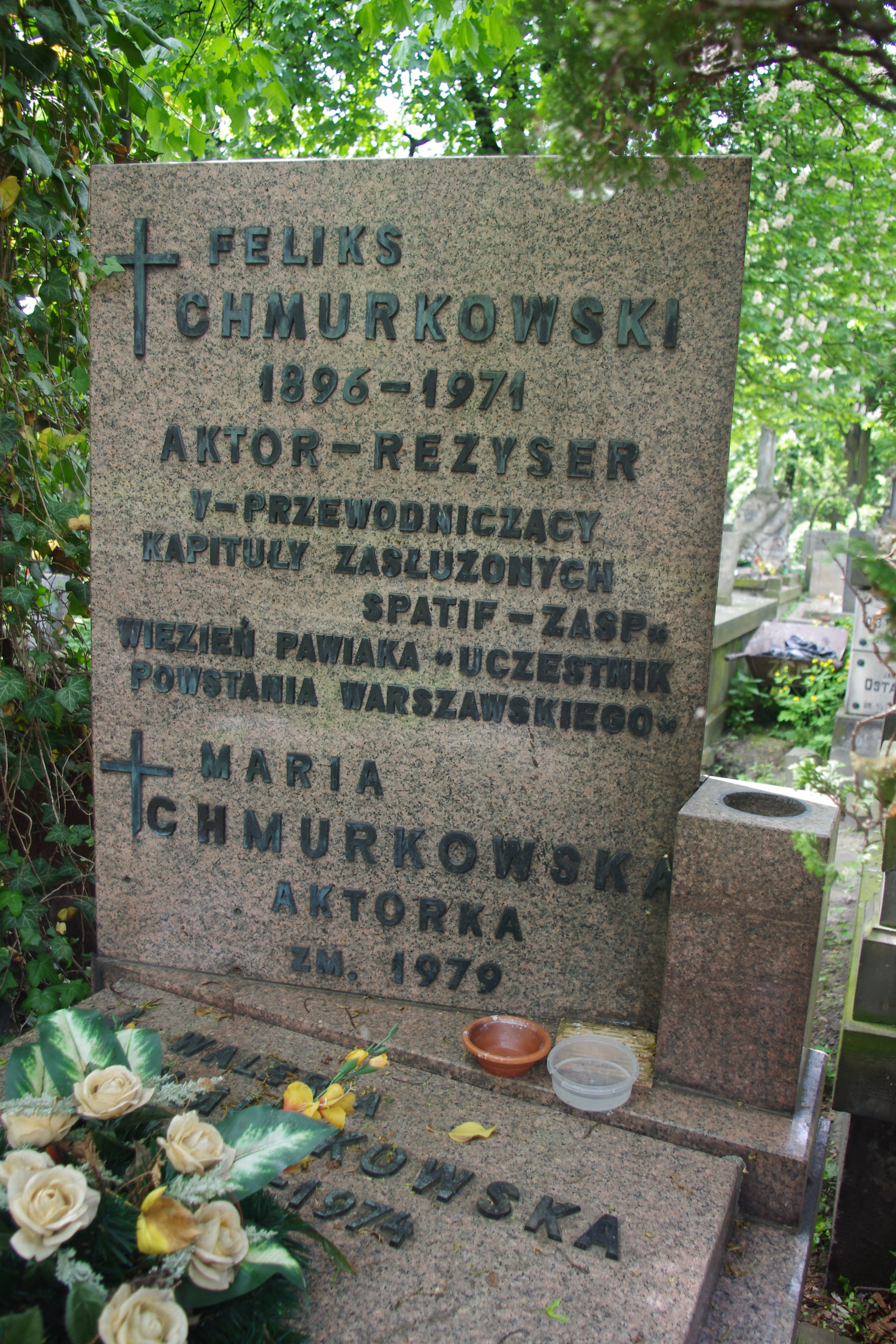
Grave of Chmurkowski at the Powązki Cemetery in Warsaw

Feliks Chmurkowski (18 May 1896 – 16 April 1971) was a Polish film actor. He appeared in more than 30 films between 1933 and 1971.

== Selected filmography ==
- His Excellency, The Shop Assistant (1933)
- Każdemu wolno kochać (1933)
- The Story of Sin (1933)
- Police Chief Antek (1935)
- Jaśnie pan szofer (1935)
- Wacuś (1935)
- Bolek i Lolek (1936)
- Bohaterowie Sybiru (1936)
- The Three Hearts (1939)
- At the End of the Road (1939)
- Krystyna's Lie (1939)
