= Tamara Wiszniewska =

Polish actress

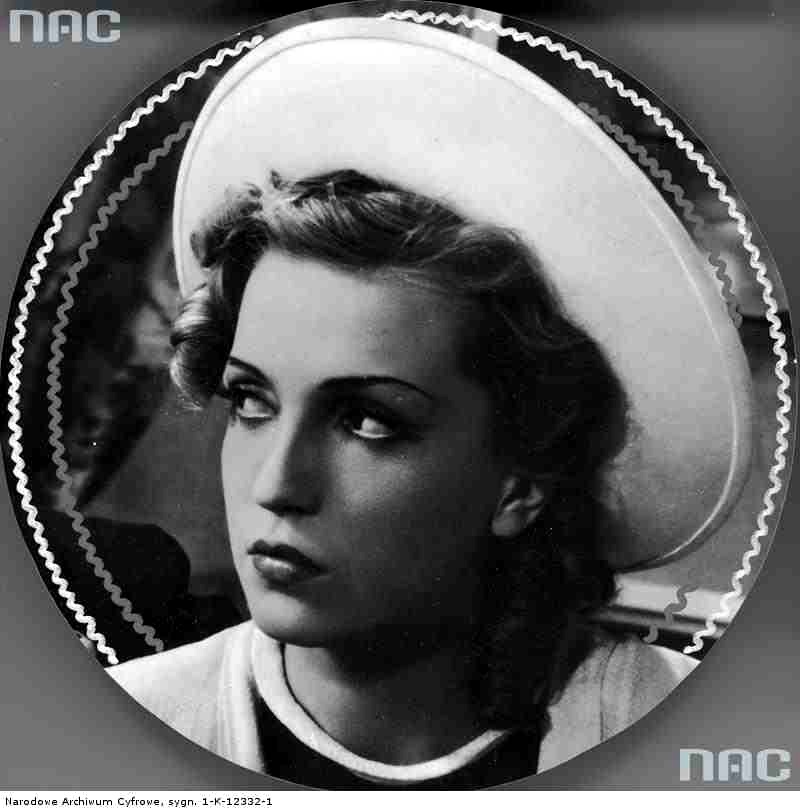
- Born: 20 December 1919; Dubno, Poland
- Died: 1 April 1981 (aged 61); Rochester, New York, United States
- Occupation: Actress
- Years active: 1934-1939 (film)

Tamara Wiszniewska (December 20, 1919 – April 1, 1981) was a Polish film actress. She was active during the 1930s during the Polish Second Republic. Her career was halted by the Invasion of Poland and she later emigrated to New York City.

== Selected filmography ==
- The Leper (1936)
- Augustus the Strong (1936)
- The Girls from Nowolipki (1937)
- Count Michorowski (1937)
- Three Troublemakers (1937)
- Kobiety nad przepaścią (1938)
- Second Youth (1938)
- At the End of the Road (1939)
- To Happiness Through Tears (1941)

== Bibliography ==
- Ford, Charles & Hammond, Robert. Polish Film: A Twentieth Century History. McFarland, 2005.
- Haltof, Marek. Polish National Cinema. Berghahn Books, 2002.
