= The Line (1938 film) =

1938 film

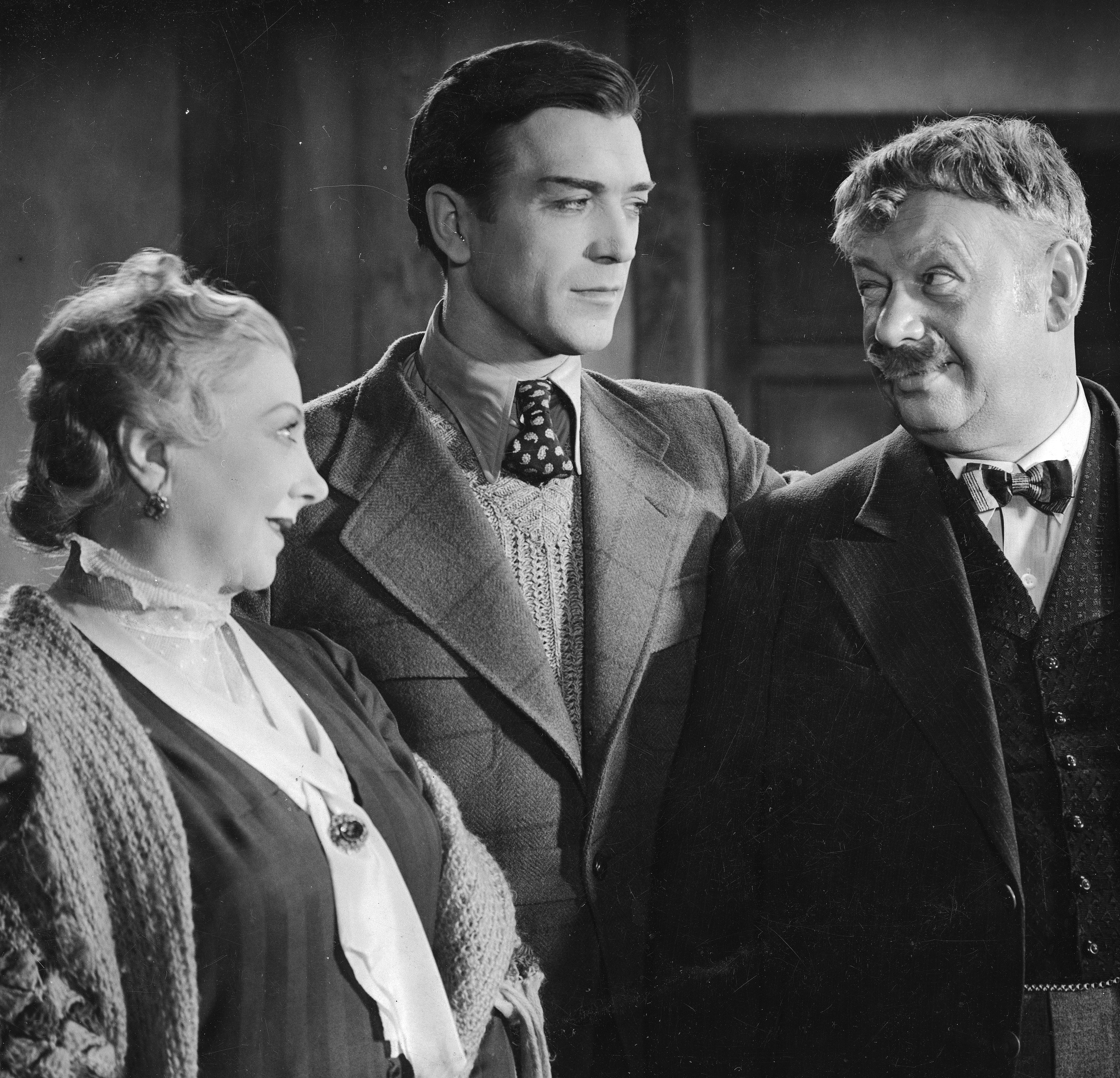
- Directed by: Joseph Lejtes
- Written by: Eugeniusz Bunda; Joseph Lejtes; Stanislaw Urbanowicz
- Based on: Granica by Zofia Nalkowska
- Produced by: Norbert Tarler
- Starring: Elzbieta Barszczewska; Lena Zelichowska; Jerzy Pichelski.
- Cinematography: Seweryn Steinwurzel
- Music by: Marian Neuteich
- Production company: Parlo Film
- Distributed by: Parlo Film
- Release date: 23 October 1938
- Running time: 89 minutes
- Country: Poland
- Language: Polish

The Line (Polish: Granica) is a 1938 Polish drama film directed by Joseph Lejtes and starring Elzbieta Barszczewska, Lena Zelichowska and Jerzy Pichelski. It was shot at the Falanga Studios in Warsaw. The film's sets were designed by the art director Stefan Norris and Jacek Rotmil.

== Cast ==
- Elzbieta Barszczewska as Elzbieta Biecka
- Lena Zelichowska as Justyna Bogutówna
- Jerzy Pichelski as Zenon Ziembiewicz
- Aleksander Zelwerowicz as Walery Ziembiewicz
- Mieczyslawa Cwiklinska as Ziembiewiczowa
- Boguslaw Samborski as Editor Czechlinski
- Stanislawa Wysocka as Aunt Cecylia Kolichowska
- Mieczyslaw Cybulski as Franek Borbocki
- Helena Buczynska as Justyna's Mother
- Zbigniew Ziembinski as Awaczewicz
- Maria Zarebinska as Jaska/Golabska
- Jadwiga Bukojemska as Julia Wagner
- Wanda Jarszewska as Dawnicka
- Zofia Wierzejska as Warkoniowa
- Janina Krzymuska as Niestrzepowa
- Jerzy Kordowski as Waiter
- Alina Halska as Nun
- Izabella Kalitowicz as Posztraska
- Aleksander Bogusinski as Count Tczewski
- Jerzy Chodecki as Servant
- Jan Ciecierski as Doctor
- Jan Tomasik as Auditor
- Zygmunt Struzewski as Porter

== Bibliography ==
- Haltof, Marek. Historical Dictionary of Polish Cinema. Rowman & Littlefield Publishers, 2015.
- Skaff, Sheila. The Law of the Looking Glass: Cinema in Poland, 1896-1939. Ohio University Press, 2008.
