= Jerzy Złotnicki =

Polish actor (1934–2021)

- Born: 6 July 1934; Warsaw, Poland
- Died: 6 October 2021 (aged 87); Konstancin-Jeziorna, Poland
- Citizenship: Polish
- Occupation: Actor
- Years active: 1948–2011

Jerzy Złotnicki (6 July 1934 – 6 October 2021) was a Polish actor, theatre director, cabaret artist and singer.

== Biography ==
In 1956 he graduated from the State College of Acting. He played in the Pomeranian Land Theatre in Bydgoszcz (1956–1961), the Juliusz Słowacki Dramatic Theatre in Koszalin (1961–1962), the 7.15 Theatre in Łódź (1963–1964), the Leon Kruczkowski Theatre in Zielona Góra (1965–1966), the Juliusz Osterwa Theatre in Gorzów Wielkopolski (1966) and the Na Targówku Theatre (1974–1986). He also performed in the Kabaret Wagabunda and the Polish Radio Theatre.

== Filmography ==
- 1948: Border Street as David Libermann
- 1964: Panienka z okienka
- 1970: Doktor Ewa as the colonist's father
- 1978: Wysokie loty as director Matusiak
- 1980: Dom (TV series)
- 1980: Teddy Bear as an actor in a theatrical performance
- 1981: Zamach stanu as Władysław Kiernik
- 1981: 07 Come In, episodes 9, 14
- 1981: Kto ty jesteś as Zdzisław Nowicki
- 1983: Katastrofa w Gibraltarze as Karol Popiel
- 1984: Godność as Kazimierz Franczuk, advisor to the Solidarity Trade Union Committee
- 1984: Miłość z listy przebojów as Rysio, Ujma's driver
- 1986: Kwestia wyboru
- 1986: Czas nadziei as Kazimierz Franczuk, advisor to the Solidarity Trade Union Committee
- 1987: W klatce as TV journalist; uncredited
- 1987: Misja specjalna as British officer; uncredited
- 1987: Koniec sezonu na lody as Szczęsna's coach
- 1988: Generał Berling as Wiktor Gross
- 1991: Cheat as doctor
- 1997: The Clan as antiquarian Nowicki, employee
- 2004, 2006, 2008: L for Love as Henryk Ziober

=== Television Theatre ===
- 1977: Przerwana gra as Antoni Łopatko
- 1985: Jałta 1945 as Charles Bohlen
- 1989: Tajny więzień stanu as Szreder

Source.

== Theatre ==
=== As actor ===
- Niemcy (1949, Old Theatre in Kraków) as a Jewish child

=== As director ===
- Maria Elżbieta Małgorzata (1984, Teatr na Targówku in Warsaw)
- W rozpaczy i gniewie (1984, Teatr na Targówku in Warsaw)
- Przygody Cipollina (1986, Teatr na Targówku in Warsaw)
- Przygody Cipollina (1987, Dramatic Theatre in Gdynia)

Source.

== Awards ==
- Silver Cross of Merit (1986)
- Medal of the 40th Anniversary of People's Poland (1986)
