= Zygmunt Wiehler =

Polish composer (1890–1977)

Zygmunt Wiehler (10 February 1890, Kraków, Austria-Hungary –26 December 1977, Warsaw) was a Polish popular and film music composer and director.

Wiehler attended the Music Conservatory in Kraków. From 1907 he was connected professionally to many theaters in the country, and in the 1920s and 1930s, he was a musical manager and director in Warsaw cabarets ("Wodewil", "Qui pro quo", "Banda", "Perskie Oko", "Morskie Oko", "Ananas", "Wielka Rewia", "Cyganeria"). He prepared music to be presented under the theatrical director Leon Schiller. During 1935-39 he was the musical manager of Feliks Parnell's Ballet. At the dance festival during the 1936 Olympics in Berlin he shared in a medal for the Parnell Ballet. At the start of the occupation (1939–40) he played piano in Warsaw cafés, then (1940–44) directed in public theaters. After the war, he divided his time between Łódź and Warsaw theaters. At the end of the 1950s he turned to his own composing. He wrote nearly a thousand songs, of which many became hits. He is buried in Powązki Cemetery (Section 287-VI-9/10).

== Film music ==
- Profesor Wilczur
- Ada! To nie wypada! (1936)
- Książątko
- Ulan ksiecia Józefa (1938)
- The Three Hearts (1939)
- Złota maska (1940)
- To Happiness Through Tears (1941)
- W chłopskie ręce (1946)
- Harmonia (1947)
- Sprawa do załatwienia (1953)

== Operetta ==
- Gwiazda Kaukazu
- Niebieski ptak

== Ballet music ==
- Dożynki, Lajkonik
- Umarł Maciek umarł
- Wesele łowickie

== Other music ==
- Tomasz, skąd ty to masz
- Niebieski walc
- Maleńki znak
