= Witold Zacharewicz =

Polish actor (1914–1943)

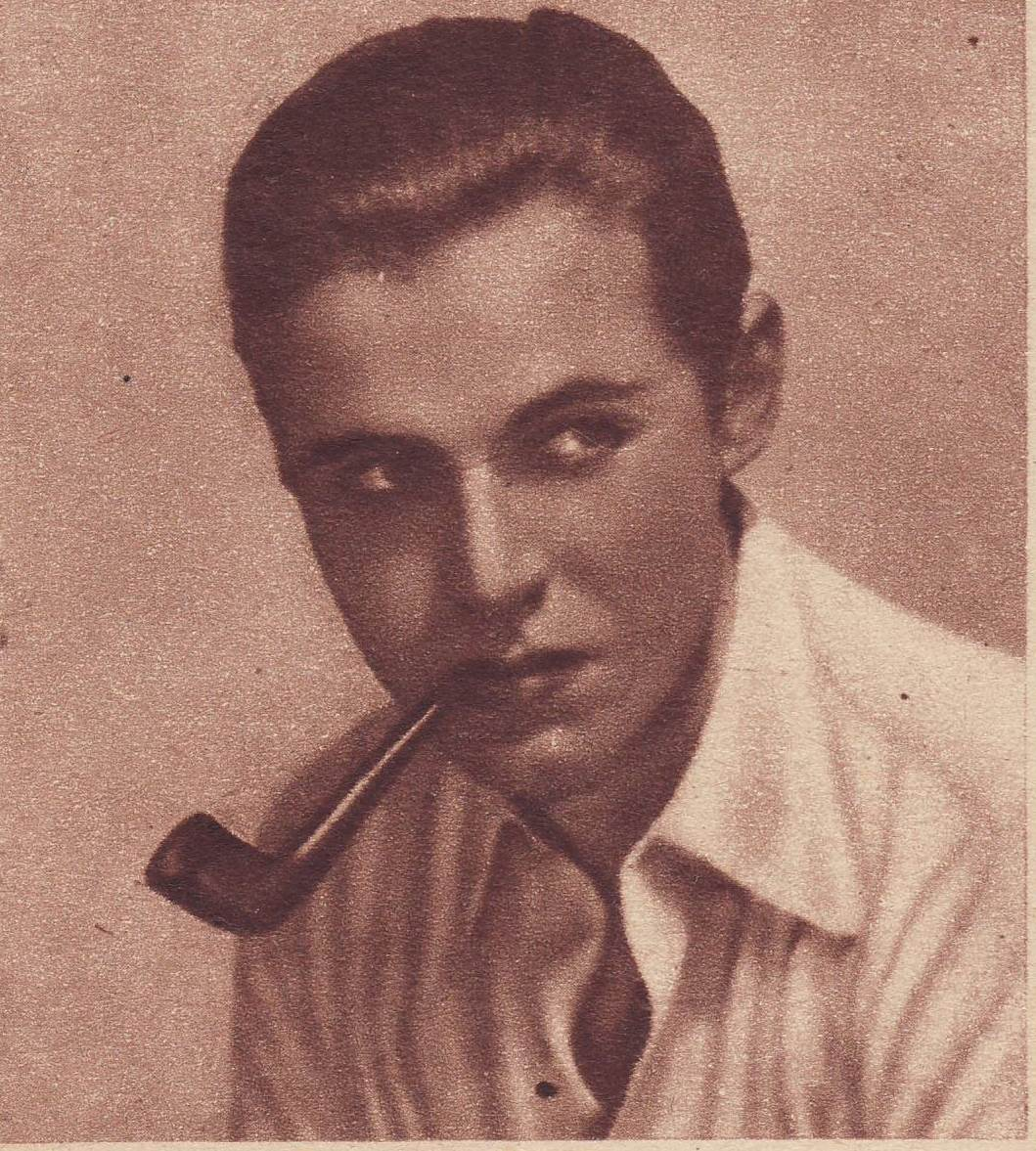
- Witold Zacharewicz
- Born: Witold Zacharewicz; 26 August 1914; Płock, Russian Empire
- Died: 16 February 1943 (aged 28); Auschwitz-Birkenau, German-occupied Poland
- Occupation: Actor
- Years active: 1933–1943
- Spouse: Halina Schneider (Schneidrówna) Zacharewicz
- Children: one son, Kiejstut Antoni Zacharewicz
- Parent(s): Wanda, nee Kraczkiewicz, Kiejstut Zacharewicz

Witold Zacharewicz (26 August 1914 – 16 February 1943) was a Polish film actor of the 1930s. During the German occupation of Poland he was arrested and murdered at Auschwitz.

== Life ==
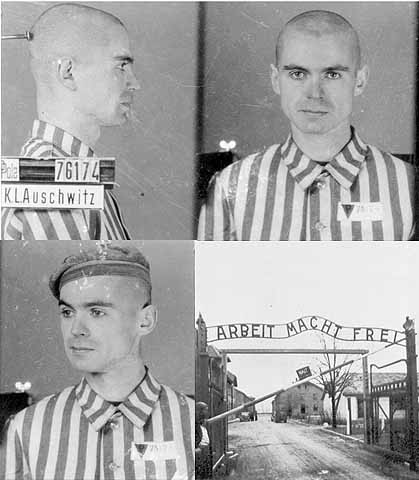
Witold Zacharewicz photographed as prisoner No. 76174 at Auschwitz

In 1938 Witold Zacharewicz got an offer to sign a deal with the Hollywood studio United Artists. He was fluent in several languages, including English, French and German. Zacharewicz was starring in what became his last film, Gehenna. He tried to defer his military service in order to go to Hollywood, but on September 1, 1938, Zacharewicz enlisted in the Polish Army.

On October 1, 1942, Zacharewicz was arrested by the Gestapo, the secret police of Nazi Germany, for aiding Jews. With ten other people, including his mother, he had been involved in the production of false documents for Jews hiding in Warsaw. In November 1942, he was deported to Auschwitz-Birkenau, where he was murdered on February 16, 1943. There are two accounts of his death: two eyewitnesses stated that he was murdered with an injection of phenol to the heart, but other former inmates have claimed that he was executed.

== Filmography ==
- Pod Twoją obronę (1933)
- Młody las (1934)
- Granny Had No Worries (1935)
- Kochaj tylko mnie (1935)
- Róża (1936)
- Barbara Radziwillówna (1936)
- Znachor (1937)
- Halka (1937)
- Profesor Wilczur (1938)
- Kościuszko pod Racławicami (1938)
- Gehenna (1938)
- Second Youth (1938)

== Bibliography ==
- Skaff, Sheila. The Law of the Looking Glass: Cinema in Poland, 1896-1939. Ohio University Press, 2008.
