= Border Street =

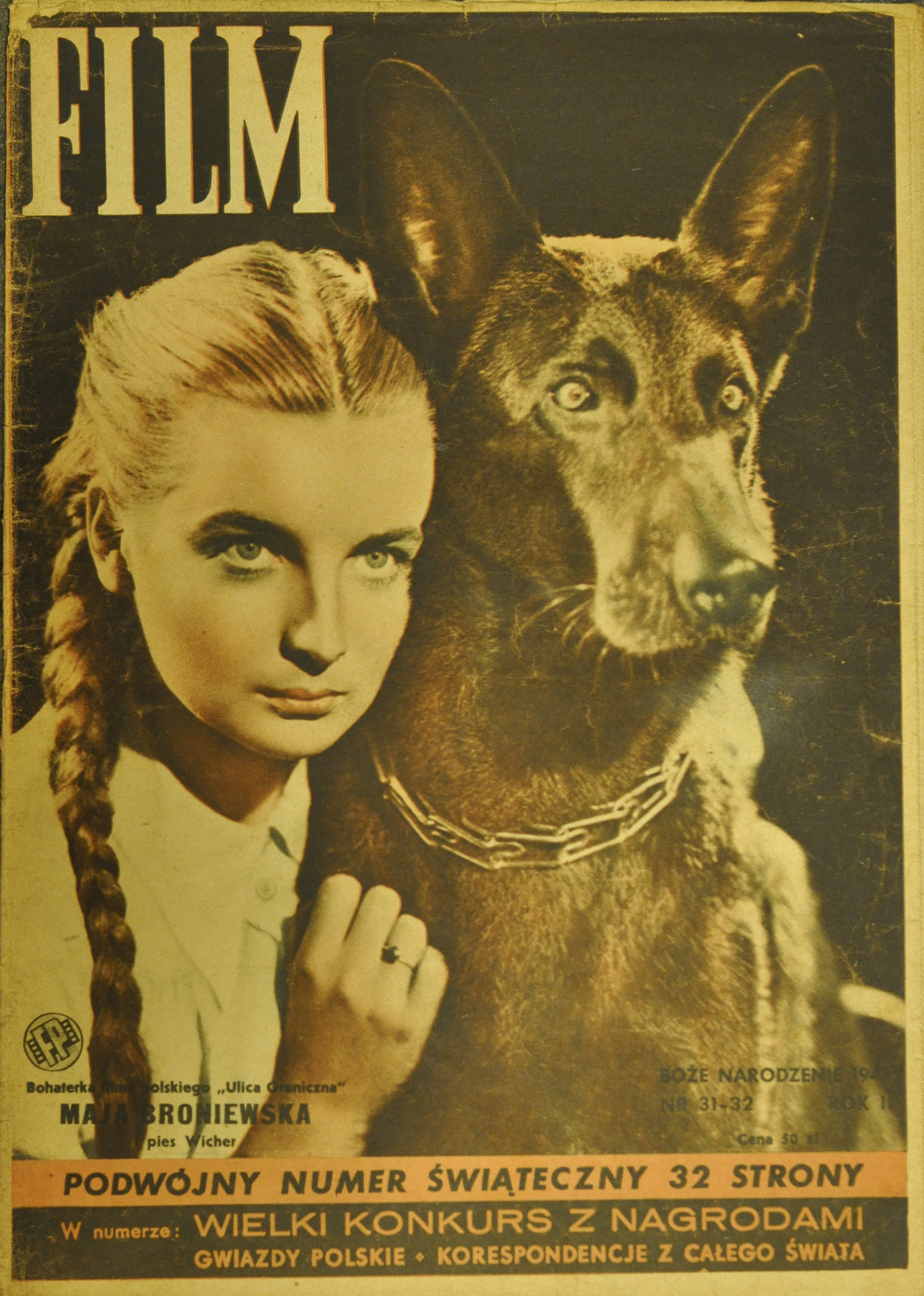
- Directed by: Aleksander Ford
- Written by: Jan Fethke; Aleksander Ford; Ludwik Starski
- Starring: Mieczysława Ćwiklińska; Jerzy Leszczyński; Władysław Godik; Jerzy Złotnicki
- Cinematography: Jaroslav Tuzar
- Edited by: Jirina Lukesová
- Music by: Roman Palester
- Production company: Film Polski
- Distributed by: Film Polski
- Release date: 1948
- Running time: 115 minutes
- Country: Poland
- Language: Polish

Border Street (Polish: Ulica Graniczna) is a 1948 Polish drama film directed by Aleksander Ford and starring Mieczysława Ćwiklińska, Jerzy Leszczyński, Jerzy Złotnicki and Władysław Godik. The film depicts the Nazis' purge of Warsaw Jews by following the fates of five families, representative of the various social, political, and ethnic strata in Warsaw, through the war, and culminates in the Warsaw Ghetto Uprising. Ford did not provide viewers a happy ending because he wanted "the viewer who watches it to realize that the issue of fascism and racial oppression is not over." It won the Gran Prix at the 1948 Venice Film Festival. The film's sets were designed by the art director Stepán Kopecký.

== Plot ==
In Poland in the summer of 1939 there was the deepest peace. The place of action is initially an ordinary Warsaw apartment building. The tenants are of different nature and social background. There is, for example, the enterprising Bronek, then young Władek, son of a Polish officer with great reservations and prejudices against Jews, then Fredek, the devious son of the pub owner Kusmirek, the small Jewish boy David Libermann with grandfather, and young Hedwig, whose Father the wealthy doctor Dr. Bialek is. There are the normal quarrels, little pranks and the usual house gossip. The peace comes to an abrupt end when the German Wehrmacht invades the Polish capital. Suddenly everything changes overnight, the Polish residents are harassed, their Jewish fellow citizens are persecuted and arrested. Some of them want to somehow come to terms with the new rulers and circumstances, others clench their fists in their pockets and others have to go into hiding as soon as they are wanted.

The old Jew Libermann, himself highly endangered, hides the Jew-hater and officer Kazimierz Wojtan, Wladek's father, who has hitherto been bold and haughty. When this is discovered, the soldier is shot. The Libermanns are forced to leave their home and move to the Warsaw ghetto, which was specially set up for the Jewish population. Bronek tries to help them there as best he can. Kusmirek tries to make friends with the "new gentlemen" and curry favor with them at every opportunity. He even puts his own son in the garb of a Hitler Youth. When the characterless bartender at Dr. Białek discovered Jewish roots, he immediately denounced him to the Gestapo. He promises to be able to take over his apartment. In fact, the doctor is picked up and deported to the ghetto, where he eventually perishes. Finally, in 1943, there was an uprising against the German occupiers. David and Hedwig take the opportunity to flee from the Germans through the sewers. Bronek and Władek help them in a crucial way. But David wants to go back to the ghetto, to fight the Nazis side by side with his brothers, gun in hand. For this fight, Władek presented him with the gun of his anti-Semitic father, who had been shot.

== Cast ==
- Mieczysława Ćwiklińska as Mrs. Klara
- Jerzy Leszczyński as Dr. Józef Bialek
- Władysław Godik as Grandfather Libermann
- Władysław Walter as Cieplikowski
- Jerzy Pichelski as Kazimierz Wojtan
- Tadeusz Fijewski as Bronek Cieplikowski / Kusmirak's hair stylist
- Józef Munclinger as Kusmirak
- Robert Vrchota as Hans, Gestapo Officer
- Stefan Sródka as Natan Sziuliu
- Eugeniusz Kruk as Fredek Kusmirak
- Jerzy Złotnicki as David Libermann
- Dionizy Ilczenko as Wladek Wojtan
- Maria Broniewska as Jadzia Bialkówna
- Justyna Kreczmar as Wanda Kusmirakówna
- Maria Zabczynska as Wojtanowa
- Irena Renardówna as Jewish Woman
- Janina Lukowska as Estera Libermann
- Halina Raciecka as Jewish Woman
- Gustav Nezval
- Antonín Holzinger
- Karel Hradilák
- Jaroslav Orlický
- P. Marek
- N. Zarina
- Bronisław Darski as Janitor Walenty
- Edward Dziewoński as Feldfebel
- S. Borowski
- Karol Koszela
- Stanissław Bielinski as Geandarm
- Ida Kamińska as Helena
- Maria Kedzierska as Woman
- Wincenty Loskot as Man
- Wojciech Pilarski as Fire guard
- Helena Puchniewska as Piszczykowa

== Bibliography ==
- Ewa Mazierska & Michael Goddard. Polish Cinema in a Transnational Context. Boydell & Brewer, 2014.
