= American Adventure (film) =

1936 film

- Directed by: Ryszard Ordynski
- Written by: Jan Fethke; Swiatopelk Karpinski; Emanuel Schlechter
- Produced by: Stanislaw Szebego
- Starring: Eugeniusz Bodo; Zofia Nakoneczna; Mieczyslawa Cwiklinska
- Cinematography: Zbigniew Gniazdowski
- Music by: Alfred Scher
- Production company: Erofilm
- Release date: 24 December 1936
- Country: Poland
- Language: Polish

American Adventure (Polish: Amerykanska awantura) is a 1936 Polish musical comedy film directed by Ryszard Ordynski and starring Eugeniusz Bodo, Zofia Nakoneczna and Mieczyslawa Cwiklinska. The film's sets were designed by the art director Jacek Rotmil.

== Cast ==
- Eugeniusz Bodo as Pawel
- Zofia Nakoneczna as Miss Ellen Ward
- Mieczyslawa Cwiklinska as Barbara Malska
- Michal Znicz as Stanislaw Skula
- Stanislaw Sielanski as Anatol Przyszczypkowski
- Tadeusz Frenkiel as Anatol Korda
- Adam Didur as Jerzy Gil
- Wanda Jarszewska
- Michal Halicz
- Jerzy Rygier
- Henryk Malkowski
- Jerzy Sulima-Jaszczolt
- Waclaw Zdanowicz
- Józef Redo

== Bibliography ==
- Ford, Charles & Hammond, Robert. Polish Film: A Twentieth Century History. McFarland, 2005.
- Haltof, Marek. Historical Dictionary of Polish Cinema. Rowman & Littlefield Publishers, 2015.
- Skaff, Sheila. The Law of the Looking Glass: Cinema in Poland, 1896-1939. Ohio University Press, 2008.
