= At the End of the Road =

1939 film

- Directed by: Michal Waszynski
- Written by: Anatol Stern
- Produced by: K.S. Poplawski
- Starring: Kazimierz Junosza-Stepowski; Irena Malkiewicz; Tamara Wiszniewska
- Cinematography: Albert Wywerka
- Edited by: Czeslaw Raniszewski
- Music by: Ivo Wesby
- Production company: K.S. Poplawski Wytwórnia Filmów
- Distributed by: Polska Spólka Filmowa
- Release date: 9 May 1939
- Running time: 69 minutes
- Country: Poland
- Language: Polish

At the End of the Road (Polish: U kresu drogi) is a 1939 Polish drama film directed by Michal Waszynski and starring Kazimierz Junosza-Stepowski, Irena Malkiewicz and Tamara Wiszniewska. It was shot at the Falanga Studios in Warsaw. The film's sets were designed by the art director Stefan Norris.

== Cast ==
- Kazimierz Junosza-Stepowski as Professor Jan Turwid
- Irena Malkiewicz as Gabriela Turwidowa
- Tamara Wiszniewska as Weronika Turwidówna
- Franciszek Brodniewicz as Count Wiktor Lanski
- Mieczyslawa Cwiklinska as Kordelia, Gabriela's aunt
- Adam Brodzisz as Jerzy
- Ludwik Fritsche as Feliks, servant
- Feliks Chmurkowski as Apothecary
- Karol Dorwski as Antique dealer
- Tadeusz Frenkiel as Turwid's antagonist at the congress
- Stanislaw Grolicki asMonk in the monastery
- Anna Jaraczówna as Maid
- Stanislaw Lapinski as Guest at the party
- Wanda Polakowska as Young Weronika
- Jerzy Roland as Doctor
- Jerzy Rygier as Member of the congress presidium
- Irena Skwierczynska as Woman in the theater audience

== Bibliography ==
- Haltof, Marek. Historical Dictionary of Polish Cinema. Rowman & Littlefield Publishers, 2015.
- Skaff, Sheila. The Law of the Looking Glass: Cinema in Poland, 1896-1939. Ohio University Press, 2008.
