= The Palace on Wheels =

1932 film

- Directed by: Ryszard Ordynski
- Written by: Wiktor Krystian; Ryszard Ordynski
- Based on: Circus by Jerzy Kossowski
- Starring: Karolina Lubienska; Igo Sym; Zbigniew Sawan
- Cinematography: Henryk Vlassak
- Music by: Michal Kondracki
- Production company: Orton
- Release date: 22 December 1932
- Country: Poland
- Language: Polish

The Palace on Wheels (Polish: Palac na kólkach) is a 1932 Polish romantic drama film directed by Ryszard Ordynski and starring Karolina Lubienska, Igo Sym and Zbigniew Sawan. The film's sets were designed by the art director Wlodzimierz Ordynski.

== Cast ==
- Karolina Lubienska as Fioretta
- Igo Sym as Eugeniusz Rancewicz, manager
- Zbigniew Sawan as Livenzo
- Nina Grudzinska as Nina
- Aleksander Zelwerowicz as Francesco
- Kazimierz Krukowski as Ajzyk Rozkosznik
- Helena Buczynska as Katty
- Julian Krzewinski as Clown Jan
- Henryk Malkowski as Clown Wan
- Halina Zawadzka as Frania
- Czeslaw Skonieczny as Chauffer
- Lucjan Zurowski as Gypsy
- Henio Francesco as Lendro
- Zbyszek Jezierski as Marko
- Kazimierz Brodzikowski as Automobilista

== Bibliography ==
- Ford, Charles & Hammond, Robert. Polish Film: A Twentieth Century History. McFarland, 2005.
- Haltof, Marek. Historical Dictionary of Polish Cinema. Rowman & Littlefield Publishers, 2015.
