= Ochrana warszawska i jej tajemnice =

1916 film

Ochrana warszawska i jej tajemnice is a Polish historical film. It was released in 1916.
