= Seweryna Broniszówna =

Seweryna Broniszówna, born Seweryna Chwat, (13 July 1887, Warsaw – 28 June 1982, Warsaw) was a Polish actress and educator. She had a prominent career as a stage actress in Poland's major theatres from her debut in 1910 until her retirement in 1971; working at the Juliusz Słowacki Theatre, Arnold Szyfman Polish Theatre, the Stefan Jaracz Theatre, and the National Theatre, Warsaw (resident artist from 1945 to 1971) among other venues. She thereafter periodically returned to the stage for guest appearances that extended until her 90th birthday in 1977 when she made her final stage appearance. While predominantly a stage performer, she occasionally worked in Polish television and film. She was the sister of writer Aleksander Wat. She taught on the faculty of the AST National Academy of Theatre Arts in Kraków.

== Selected filmography ==
- Obrona Częstochowy (1913)
- Barbara Radziwiłłówna (1936)
- Niedorajda (1937)
- Gehenna (1938)
- Spiral (1978)
