= Jerzy Pichelski =

Polish film and theatre actor

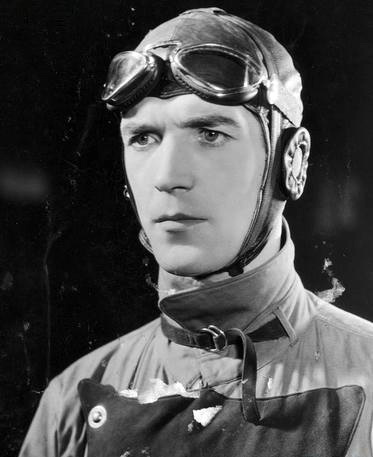
Pichelski in the film Szpieg w masce, 1933

Jerzy Pichelski (27 November 1903, Saratov – 5 April 1963, Warsaw) was a Polish film and theatre actor.

== Selected filmography ==
- Ostatnia brygada (1938)
- Florian (1938)
- The Line (1938)
- The Three Hearts (1939)
- Border Street (1948)
- Lotna (1959)
- Knights of the Teutonic Order (1960)
- Zamach (1960)
- Bad Luck (1960)

== Bibliography ==
- Skaff, Sheila. The Law of the Looking Glass: Cinema in Poland, 1896-1939. Ohio University Press, 2008.
