= Helena Buczyńska =

Polish actress

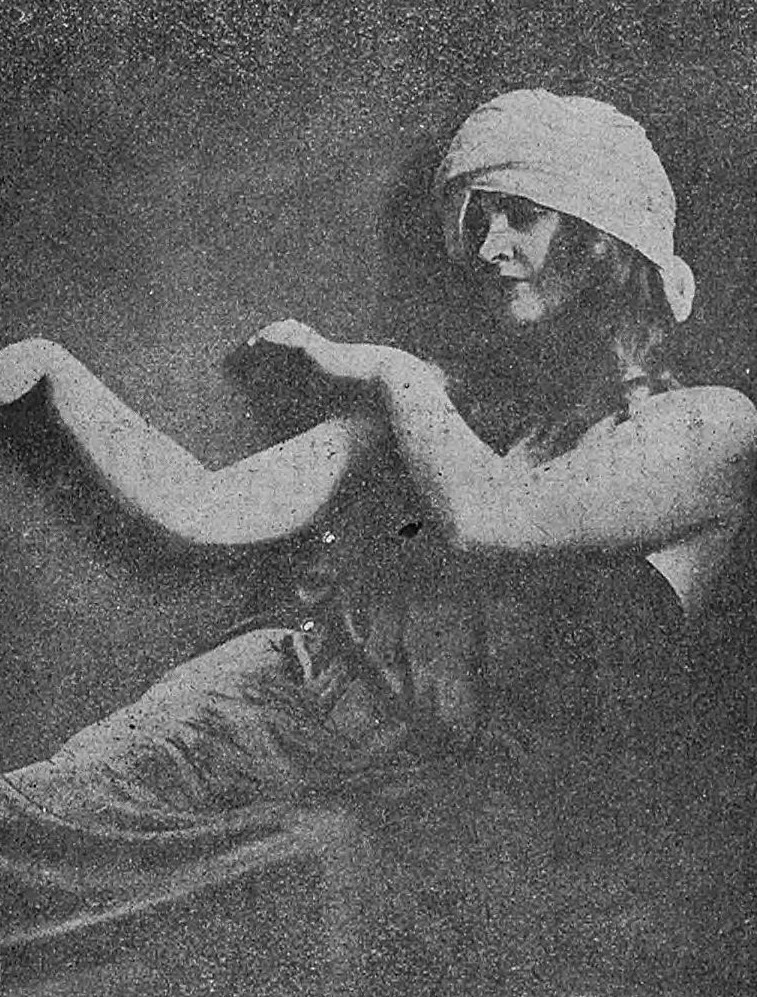
- Born: 2 December 1894; Shchigry, Kursk Governorate
- Died: 21 December 1957 (aged 63); MS Batory
- Occupation: Actress

Helena Buczyńska (1894–1957) was a Polish actress.

== Selected filmography ==
- The Palace on Wheels (1932)
- His Excellency, The Shop Assistant (1933)
- Granny Had No Worries (1935)
- The Girls from Nowolipki (1937)
- Profesor Wilczur (1938)
- The Line (1938)
- The Vagabonds (1939)
- The Three Hearts (1939)
- A Sportsman Against His Will (1940)
- Irena do domu! (1955)

== Bibliography ==
- Skaff, Sheila. The Law of the Looking Glass: Cinema in Poland, 1896-1939. Ohio University Press, 2008.
