= The Three Hearts =

- Directed by: Michał Waszyński
- Written by: Tadeusz Dołęga-Mostowicz (novel)
- Starring: Jerzy Pichelski; Aleksander Żabczyński; Elżbieta Barszczewska; Zofia Lindorf
- Cinematography: Albert Wywerka
- Edited by: Czesław Raniszewski
- Music by: Zygmunt Wiehler
- Production company: Warszawskie Biuro Kinematograficzne Feniks
- Release date: 17 March 1939
- Running time: 90 minutes
- Country: Poland
- Language: Polish

The Three Hearts (Polish: Trzy serca) is a 1939 Polish romantic comedy film directed by Michał Waszyński and starring Jerzy Pichelski, Aleksander Żabczyński and Elżbieta Barszczewska. It was based on a novel by Tadeusz Dołęga-Mostowicz.

== Cast ==
- Jerzy Pichelski as Maciek Tyniecki / Maciek Kudro
- Aleksander Żabczyński as Gogo Kudro
- Elżbieta Barszczewska as Kasia
- Leokadia Pancewicz-Leszczyńska as Countess Matylda Tyniecka
- Zofia Lindorf as Michalinka Zurda
- Tadeusz Białoszczyński as Aleksander Kudro
- Aleksander Zelwerowicz as Uncle Seweryn Tukałło
- Helena Buczyńska as Aunt Betsy
- Janina Krzymuska as Aunt Klotylda 'Klocia'
- Stanislaw Łapiński as Land Steward
- Feliks Chmurkowski as Mr. Kolicz
- Stanisław Grolicki as Apartment Superintendent
- Jerzy Chodecki as Lawyer

== Bibliography ==
- Skaff, Sheila. The Law of the Looking Glass: Cinema in Poland, 1896-1939. Ohio University Press, 2008.
