= The Story of Sin =

1975 film

- Film poster
- Directed by: Walerian Borowczyk
- Written by: Stefan Żeromski; Walerian Borowczyk
- Starring: Grażyna Długołęcka
- Cinematography: Zygmunt Samosiuk
- Edited by: Lidia Pacewicz
- Release date: 3 June 1975
- Running time: 130 minutes
- Country: Poland
- Language: Polish

The Story of Sin (Polish: Dzieje grzechu) is a 1975 Polish drama film directed by Walerian Borowczyk based on the novel Dzieje grzechu by Stefan Żeromski. It was entered into the 1975 Cannes Film Festival.

== Cast ==
- Grażyna Długołęcka as Ewa Pobratynska
- Jerzy Zelnik as Lukasz Niepolomski
- Olgierd Łukaszewicz as Count Zygmunt Szczerbic
- Roman Wilhelmi as Antoni Pochron
- Marek Walczewski as Plaza-Splawski
- Karolina Lubieńska as Mrs. Pobratynska, Ewa's mother
- Zdzisław Mrożewski as Mr. Pobratynski, Ewa's father
- Mieczysław Voit as Count Cyprian Bodzanta
- Marek Bargiełowski as Adolf Horst
- Jolanta Szemberg as Aniela
- Zbigniew Zapasiewicz as Priest Jutkiewicz
- Władysław Hańcza as Dr. Wielgosinski
- Jadwiga Chojnacka as Leoska, servant
- Bogusław Sochnacki
- Janusz Zakrzeński as Editor of 'Tygodnik Naukowy'
