= Lviv =

City in Lviv Oblast, Ukraine

Lviv Львів (Ukrainian)
- City
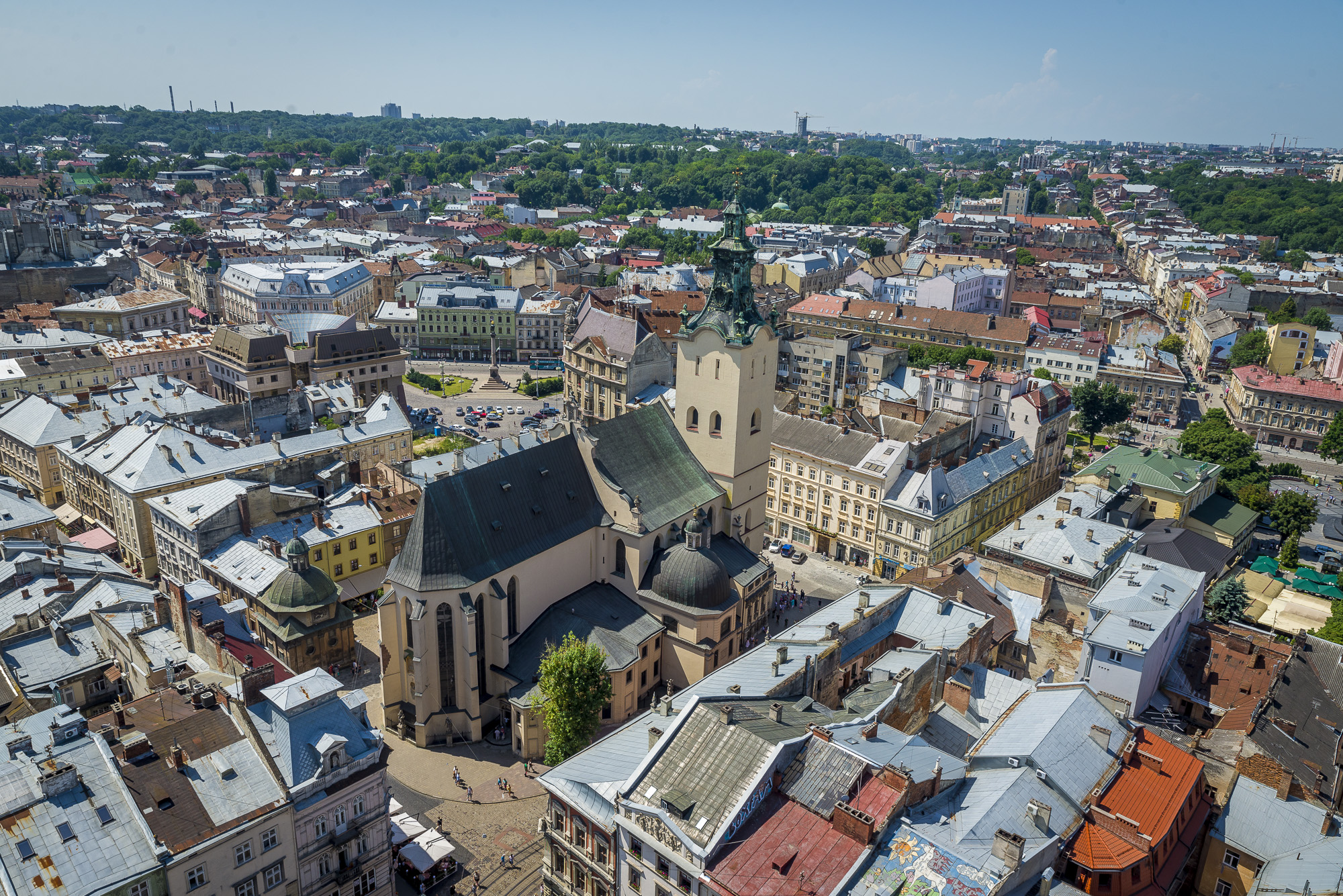
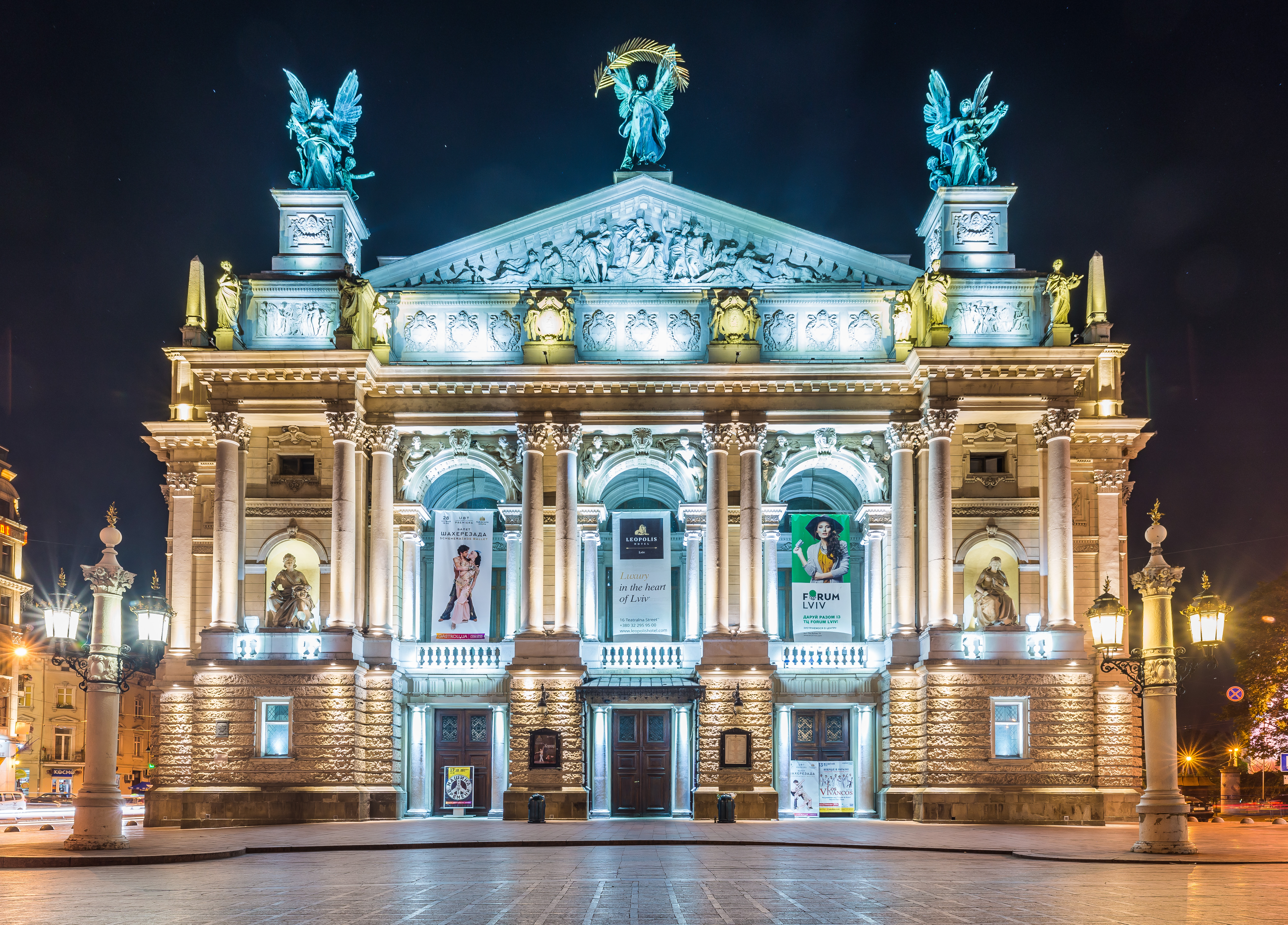
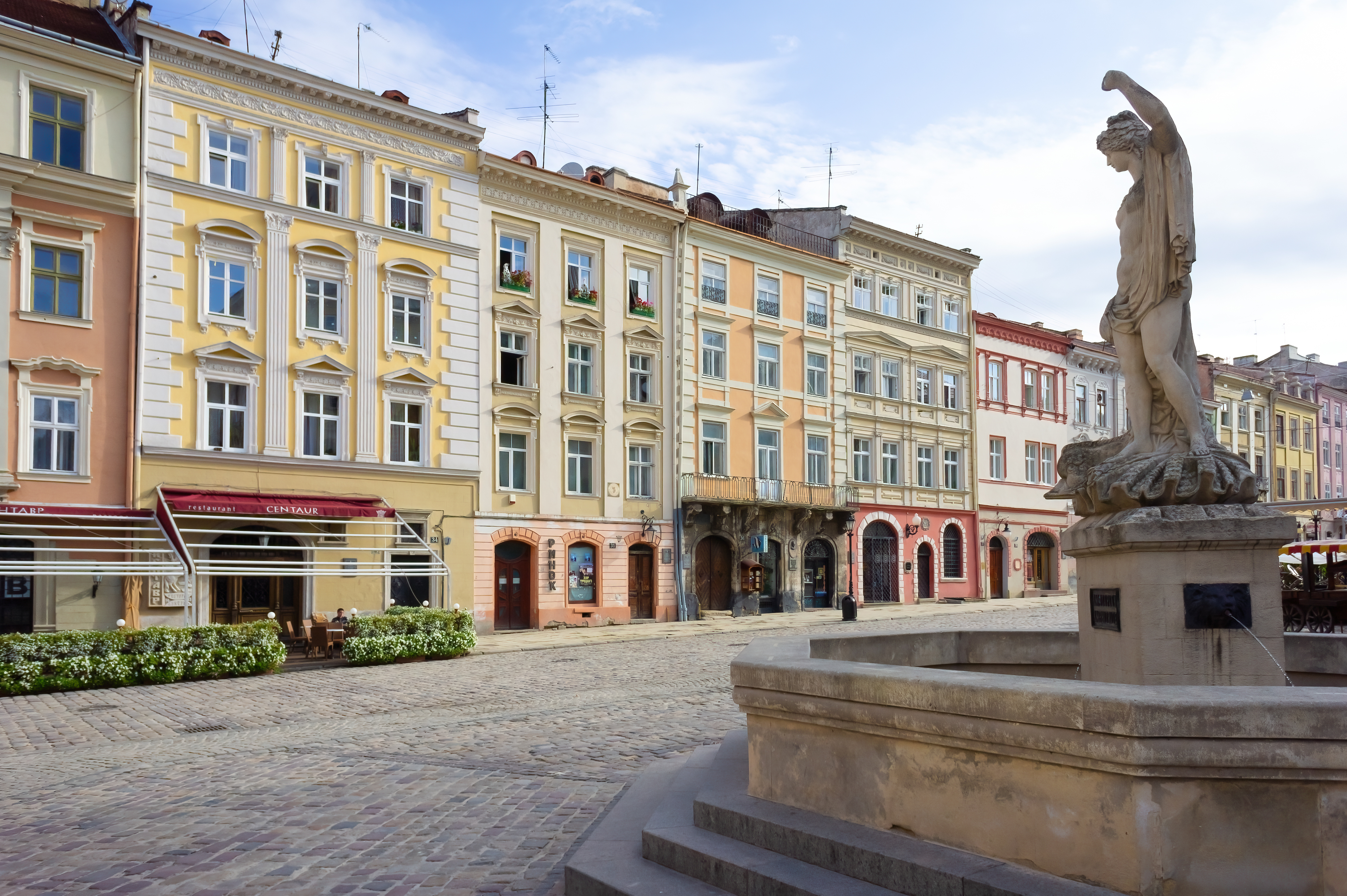
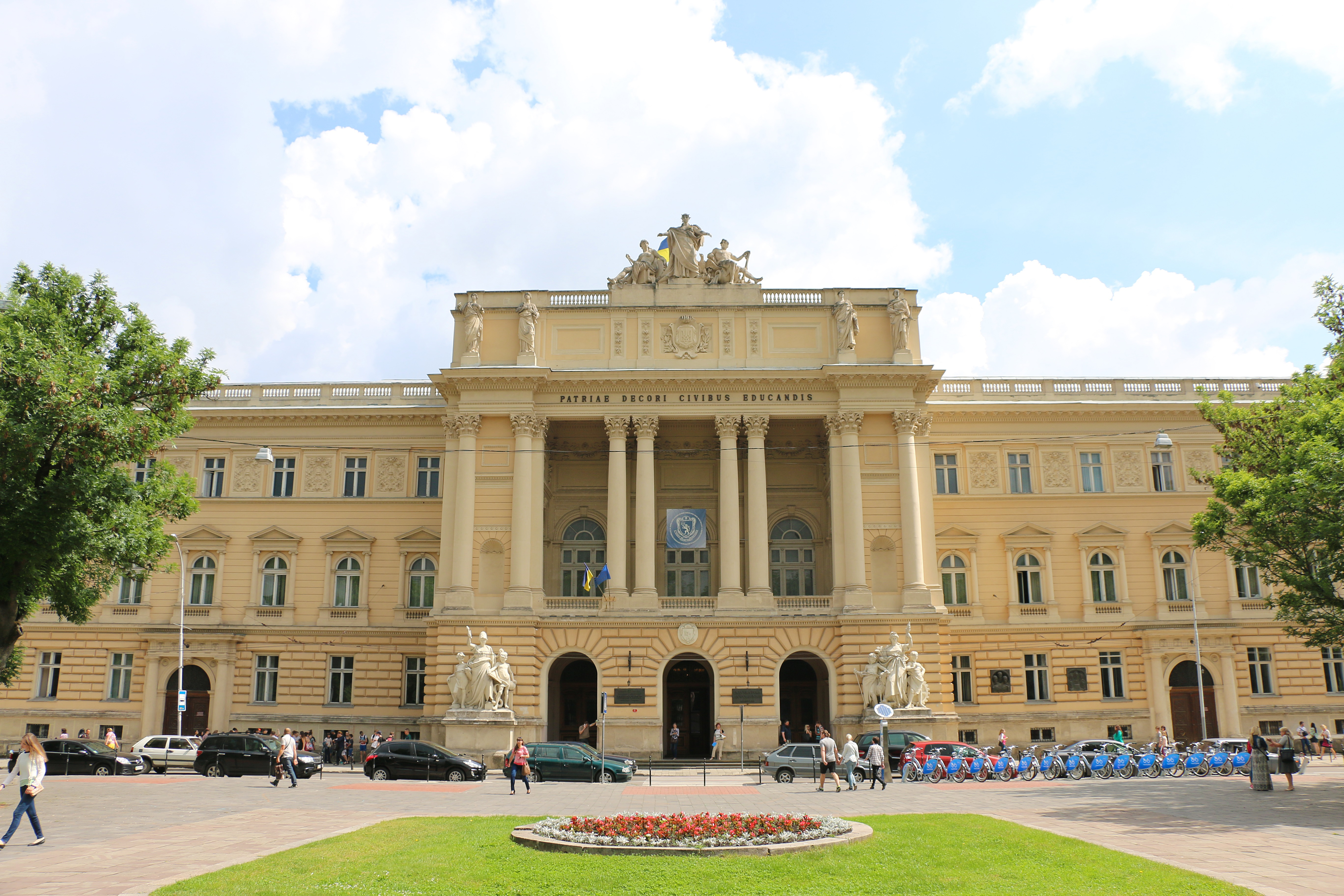
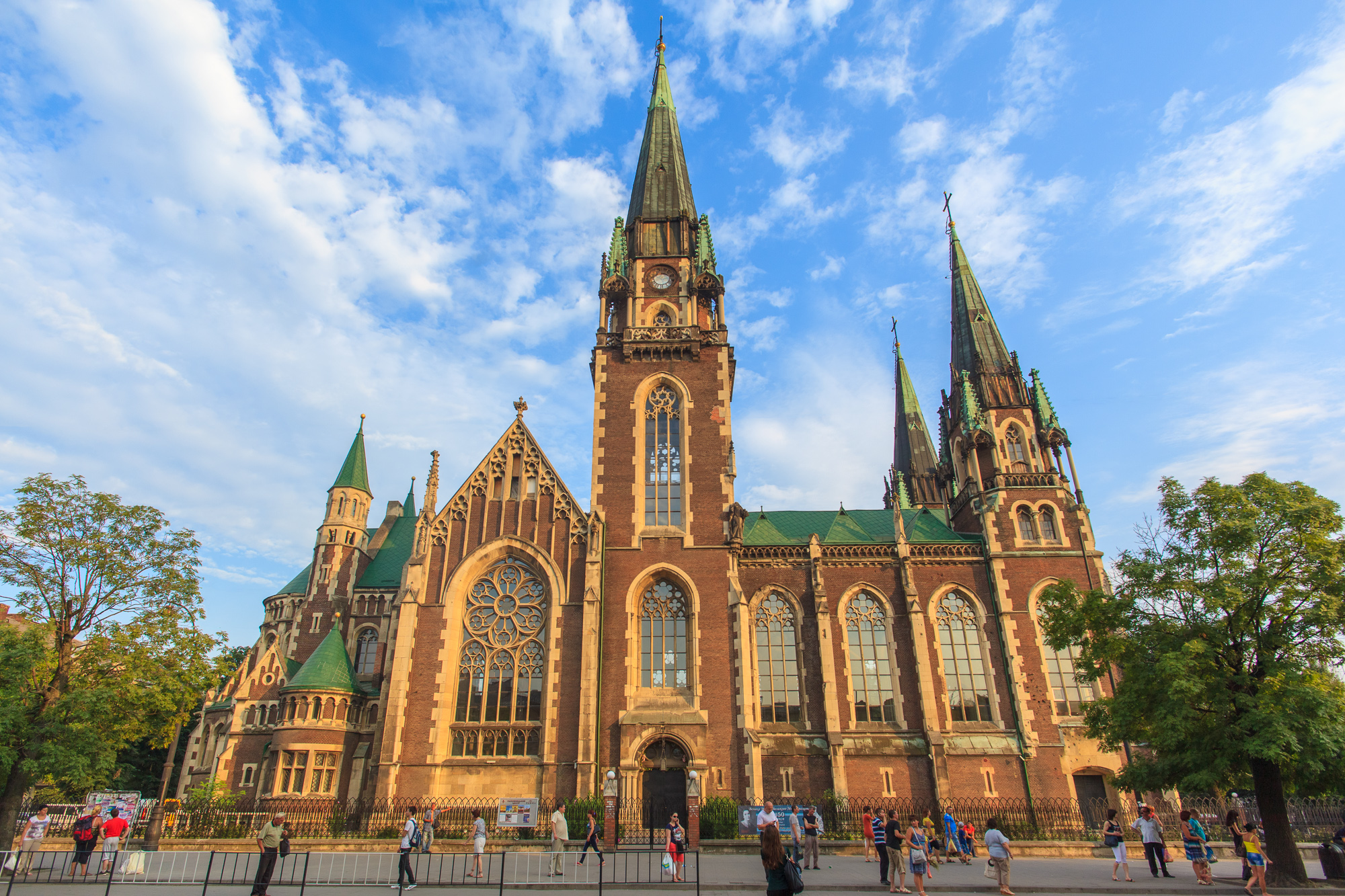
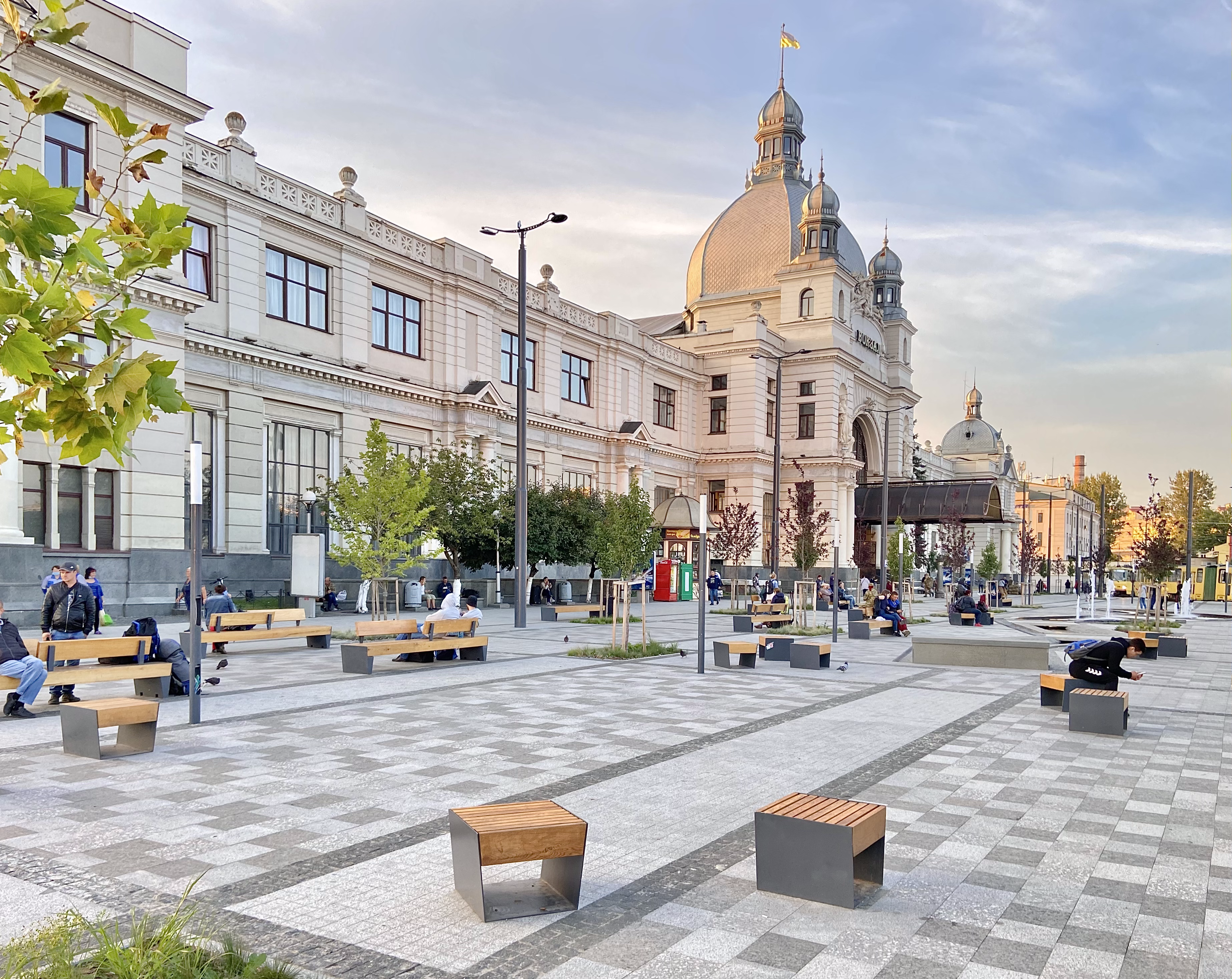
- Old Town Lviv Opera Dormition Church Market Square Lviv University Sts. O. and E. Church Railway Station

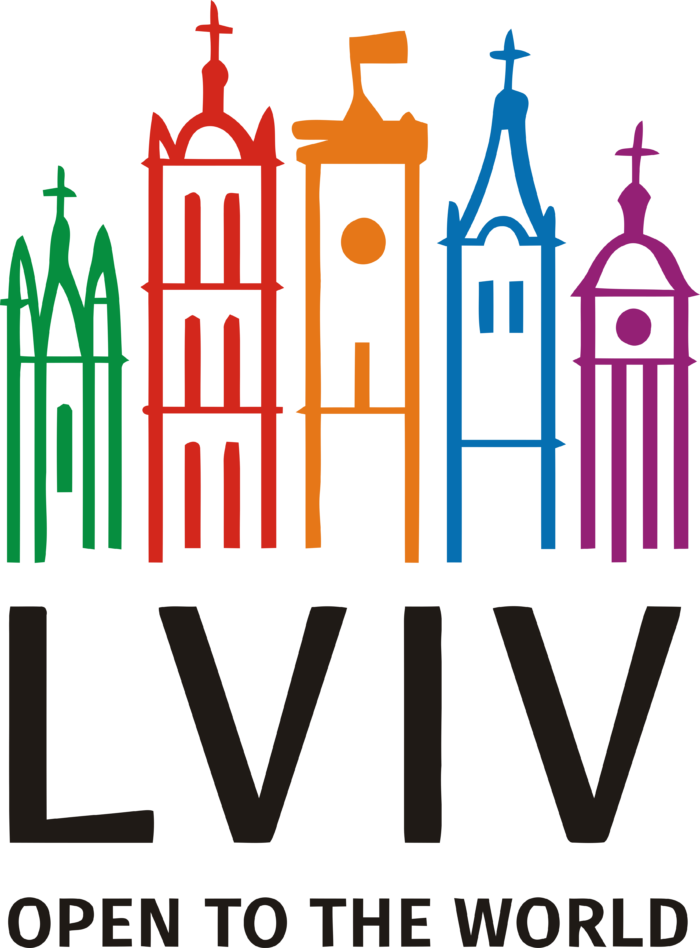
- Flag Coat of arms Logo
- Nicknames: Lion's/Leo's City, Banderstadt (tongue-in-cheek)
- Motto(s): "Lviv is open to the world" Semper fidelis (historical)
- Location within Lviv Oblast Location within Ukraine Location within Europe
- Coordinates: 49°50′33″N 24°01′56″E
- Country: Ukraine
- Oblast: Lviv Oblast
- Raion: Lviv Raion
- Hromada: Lviv urban hromada
- Founded: 1256
- Town rights: 1356

Government
  - Mayor: Andriy Sadovyi (Self Reliance)

Area
  - City: 148.9 km^{2} (57.5 sq mi)
  - Metro: 4,975 km^{2} (1,921 sq mi)
- Elevation: 296 m (971 ft)

Population (2025)
  - City: 723,403
  - Rank: 5th in Ukraine
  - Density: 4,858/km^{2} (12,580/sq mi)
  - Urban: 720,797
  - Metro: 1,141,119
- Demonyms: Leopolitan
- Time zone: UTC+2 (EET)
  - Summer (DST): UTC+3 (EEST)
- Postal codes: 79000–79490
- Area code: +380 32(2)
- Licence plate: BC, HC (before 2004: ТА, ТВ, ТН, ТС)
- Website: city-adm.lviv.ua

UNESCO World Heritage Site
- Official name: L'viv – the Ensemble of the Historic Centre
- Criteria: Cultural: ii, v
- Reference: 865
- Inscription: 1998 (22nd Session)
- Endangered: 2023–present
- Area: 2,441 ha (6,030 acres)

Lviv (Note: /ləˈviːv/ lə-VEEV or /ləˈviːf/ lə-VEEF) (Ukrainian: Львів [ˈlʲʋʲiu̯]; Polish: Lwów (Note: [ˈlvuf]); German: Lemberg (Note: [ˈlɛmbɛʁk])) is the sixth-largest city in Ukraine, as well as the largest city in the western part of the country, with a population of 723,403 (2025 estimate). It serves as the administrative center of Lviv Oblast and Lviv Raion, and is one of the main cultural centers of Ukraine. The city also hosts the administration of Lviv urban hromada. Lviv was named after Leo I of Galicia, the eldest son of Daniel, King of Ruthenia. During its history the city has had several names.

In the 14th century, Lviv emerged as the heart of the historical regions of Red Ruthenia and Galicia, superseding other historic cities such as Halych, Chełm, Belz, and Przemyśl. It was the capital of the Kingdom of Galicia–Volhynia from 1272 to 1340, when it went to King Casimir III the Great of Poland in a war of succession. In 1356, Casimir the Great granted it town rights. From 1434, it was the regional capital of the Ruthenian Voivodeship in the Kingdom of Poland. In 1772, after the First Partition of Poland, the city became the capital of the Habsburg semi-autonomous Kingdom of Galicia and Lodomeria. Between 1918 and 1939, the city was the heart of the Lwów Voivodeship in the Second Polish Republic. During this period the city's culture and industry flourished, as did its academic institutions. After the German-Soviet invasion of Poland in 1939, Lwów was annexed by the Soviet Union. It survived Soviet and German occupations during World War II largely unscathed. In February 1946, the city became a part of the Ukrainian Soviet Socialist Republic, having lost an estimated 80-90% of its prewar population. In 1991, with the dissolution of the Soviet Union, Lviv stayed part of Ukraine.

Lviv has a number of industries and institutions of higher education, such as Lviv University and Lviv Polytechnic. The city is also the home of multiple cultural institutions, including the Academic Symphony Orchestra of the Lviv Philharmonic and the Lviv Theatre of Opera and Ballet. The historical heart of the city has cobblestone streets and an assortment of Renaissance, Baroque, Neoclassicist and Art Nouveau architecture; it is listed on the UNESCO World Heritage List. It is listed as an endangered site due to the Russian invasion of Ukraine.

== Names and symbols ==
The city of Lviv has been known by multiple names. These include, amongst others: Ukrainian: Львів (Lʹviv) [ˈlʲʋʲiu̯]; Polish: Lwów [ˈlvuf]; German: Lwiw [l(ə)ˈviːf] and Lemberg [ˈlɛmbɛʁk]; Yiddish: לעמבעריק (Lemberik) [ˈlɛmbɛrɪk]; Russian: Львов (Lʹvov) [ˈlʲvof]; Belarusian: Львоў (Lʹvoŭ) [ˈlʲvou̯]; Armenian: Լվով (Lvov) [ˈlvɔv] and Իլով (Ilov) [iˈlov]; Hungarian: Ilyvó [ˈijvoː], and Latin: Leopolis.

The coat-of-arms of Lwów (1918–1939)

The coat of arms, and the logo and banner of the Lviv City Council are the officially approved symbols of Lviv. The names or images of architectural and historical monuments are also considered symbols of the city. The city's modern coat of arms is based on that of a mid-14th-century seal. The modern seal depicts a stone gate with three towers, and in the opening of the gate walks a golden lion. Lviv's large coat of arms is a shield, with the coat of arms of the city, crowned with a silver crown with three edges, held by a lion and an ancient warrior.

Lviv's flag is a blue square banner with an image of the city emblem and with yellow and blue triangles at the edges. Lviv's logo is an image of five colourful towers in Lviv and the slogan "Lviv – open to the world" under them. The Latin phrase Semper fidelis ('Always faithful') was used as a motto on the former coat of arms of 1936–1939 but was no longer used after the Second World War.

== History ==
Historical affiliations

Kingdom of Galicia–Volhynia c. 1250–1340
Kingdom of Poland 1340–1569
Poland (First Republic) 1569–1772
Austria/A.H. Empire 1772–1918
Poland (Second Republic) 1918–1939
Soviet Union (Ukrainian SSR) 1939–1941 (occupation)
Nazi Germany (General Government) 1941–1944 (occupation)
Soviet Union (Ukrainian SSR) 1944–1991
Ukraine 1991–present

Archaeologists have demonstrated that the Lviv area was settled by the fifth century, with the gord at Chernecha Hora-Novoznesenska Street in Lychakivskyi District attributed to White Croats. Following the Batu Khan invasion of 1240, King Daniel of Galicia reconstructed the stronghold. A settlement subsequently developed in the form of a borough, distinguished by an elongated market square. The city of Lviv was founded in 1250 by Daniel and named in honour of his son Lev as Lvihorod which is consistent with names of other Ukrainian cities, such as Myrhorod, Sharhorod, Novhorod, Bilhorod, Horodyshche, and Horodok. Daniel invited German merchants and artisans, primarily from Poland and Silesia, to settle in Lviv during the mid-13th century.

Lviv was invaded by the Mongols in 1261. Various sources relate the events, which range from the destruction of the castle to a complete razing of the town. All sources agree that it was on the orders of the Mongol general Burundai. The Shevchenko Scientific Society says that Burundai issued the order to raze the city. The Galician-Volhynian chronicle states that in 1261 "Said Buronda to Vasylko: 'Since you are at peace with me then raze all your castles'". Basil Dmytryshyn states that the order was implied to be the fortifications as a whole: "If you wish to have peace with me, then destroy [all fortifications of] your towns".

After Daniel's death, King Lev rebuilt the town around 1270, choosing Lviv as his residence, and made it the capital of Galicia-Volhynia.

In 1272, Lev Danilovich, who promoted the development of the city. In particular, he designated three districts for the Armenian, Tatar and Jewish newcomers. The east district – for the Ruthenians, the north - for the Armenians, Tatars, in the south - for the Jews.

Around 1280 Armenians lived in Galicia and were mainly based in Lviv where they had their own archbishop.

In the 13th and early 14th centuries, Lviv was largely a wooden city, except for its several Galician-style stone churches. Some of them, like the Church of Saint Nicholas, have survived, although in a thoroughly rebuilt form. The town was inherited by the Grand Duchy of Lithuania in 1340 and ruled by voivode Dmytro Dedko, the favourite of the Lithuanian prince Liubartas, until 1349.

In the 13th and 14th centuries the city and region was a destination of 50,000 Armenians fleeing from the Saljuq and Mongol invasions of Armenia.

=== Galicia–Volhynia Wars ===
During the wars over the succession of Galicia-Volhynia Principality in 1339 King Casimir III of Poland undertook an expedition and captured the city in 1340, burning down the old princely castle. Poland ultimately gained control over Lviv and the adjacent region in 1349. From then on the population was subjected to attempts to both Polonize and Catholicize the population. The Lithuanians ravaged Lviv land in 1351 during the Halych-Volhyn Wars with Lviv being plundered and destroyed by duke Liubartas in 1353.

Casimir built a new city centre (or founded a new town) in a basin, surrounded it by walls, and replaced the wooden palace by masonry castle – one of the two built by him. The old (Ruthenian) settlement, after it had been rebuilt, became known as the Krakovian Suburb in reference to the city of Kraków.

=== Kingdom of Poland ===
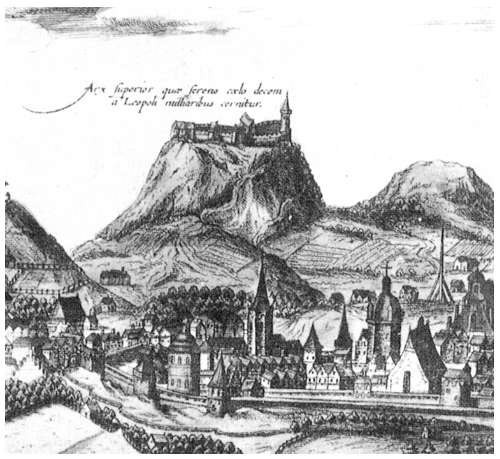
High Castle built in 1362 by Casimir III of Poland (engraving by A. Gogenberg, 17th century)

In 1349, the Kingdom of Ruthenia with its capital Lviv was annexed by the Crown of the Kingdom of Poland. The kingdom was transformed into the Ruthenian domain of the Crown with Lwów as the capital. On 17 June 1356 King Casimir III the Great moved the city to a new location and granted it Magdeburg rights, which implied that all city matters were to be resolved by a council elected by the wealthy citizens. The city's German-speaking Catholic burghers emerged as the dominant urban community and benefited from the support of the Polish monarch. In 1358, the city became a seat of a Roman Catholic Archdiocese, which initiated the spread of the Latin Church onto the Ruthenian lands. In 1362, the High Castle was built with stone.

After Casimir died in 1370, he was succeeded as king of Poland by his nephew, King Louis I of Hungary, who in 1372 put Lwów together with the region of Kingdom of Galicia–Volhynia under the administration of his relative Vladislaus II of Opole, Duke of Opole. When in 1387 Władysław retreated from the post of its governor, Galicia-Volhynia was occupied by Hungary, but Jadwiga, the youngest daughter of Louis, and also the ruler of Poland and wife of King of Poland Władysław II Jagiełło, unified it directly with the Crown of the Kingdom of Poland.

As one of the largest and most influential royal cities of Poland, it enjoyed voting rights in the Royal elections in Poland, alongside other major cities such as Kraków, Poznań, Warsaw or Gdańsk. During the 17th century, it was the second largest city of the Polish–Lithuanian Commonwealth, with a population of about 30,000. The city also served as a centre of education, housing a Jesuit Collegium and a school managed by the local Orthodox brotherhood.

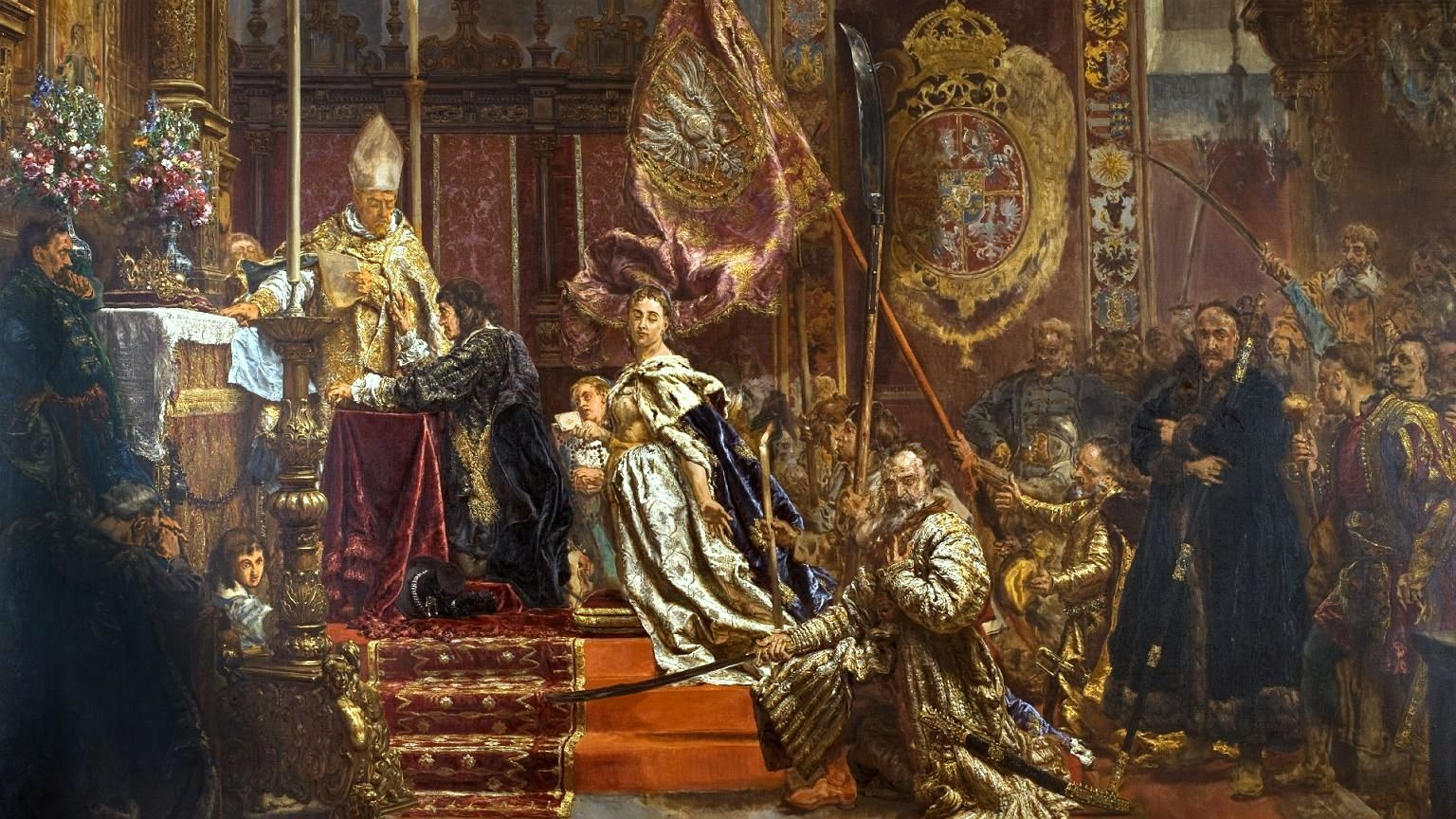
John II Casimir, King of Poland, pledging an oath at Lwów's Latin Cathedral, by painter Jan Matejko. Collection of the Wrocław Museum.

In the 17th century Lviv was besieged unsuccessfully several times. Constant struggles against invading armies gave it the motto Semper fidelis. In 1648, the city was besieged by the Cossacks under Bohdan Khmelnytsky, who seized and destroyed the local castle. However, the Cossacks did not retain the city and withdrew, satisfying themselves with a ransom. In 1655 the Swedish armies invaded Poland and soon took most of it. Eventually the Polish king Jan II Kazimierz solemnly pronounced his vow to consecrate the country to the protection of the Mother of God and proclaimed Her the Patron and Queen of the lands in his kingdom at Lwów Latin Cathedral in 1656 (Lwów Oath).

In 1672, the city was surrounded by the Ottomans who also failed to conquer it. Three years later, the Battle of Lwów (1675) took place near the city. Lwów was captured for the first time since the Middle Ages by a foreign army in 1704, when Swedish troops under King Charles XII entered the city after a short siege.

=== Habsburg Empire ===
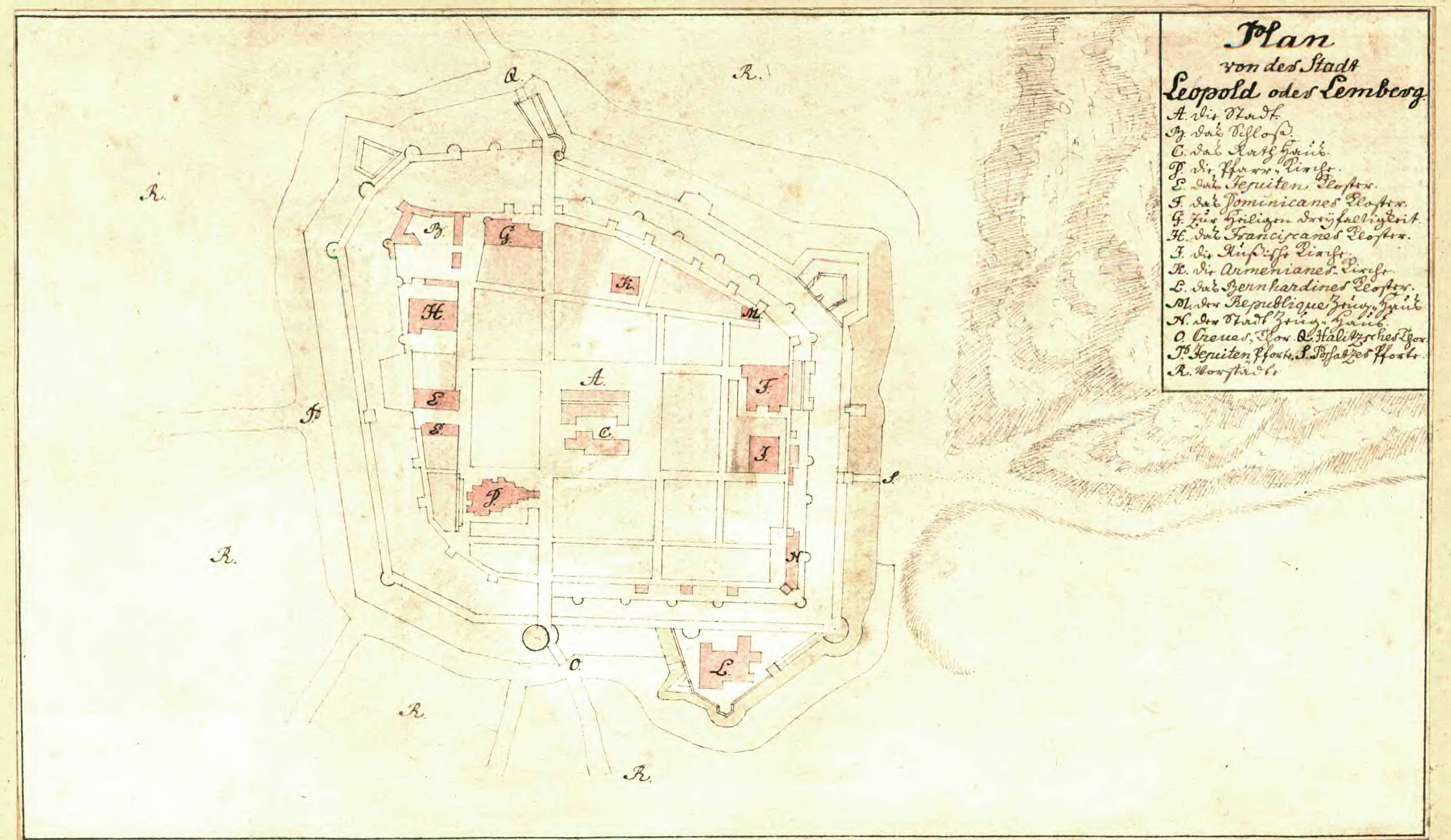
18th century map of Lemberg (Lviv, Lwów)

In 1772, following the First Partition of Poland, the region was annexed by the Habsburg monarchy to the Austrian Partition. Known in German as Lemberg, the city became the capital of the Kingdom of Galicia and Lodomeria. Lemberg grew dramatically during the 19th century, increasing in population from approximately 30,000 at the time of the Austrian annexation in 1772, to 196,000 by 1910 and to 212,000 three years later; rapid population growth brought about an increase in urban squalor and poverty in Austrian Galicia. In the late 18th and early 19th centuries a large influx of Austrians and German-speaking Czech bureaucrats gave the city a character that by the 1840s was quite Austrian, in its orderliness and in the appearance and popularity of Austrian coffeehouses.

During Habsburg rule, Lviv became one of the most important Polish, Ukrainian and Jewish cultural centres. In Lviv, according to the Austrian census of 1910, which listed religion and language, 51% of the city's population was Roman Catholics, 28% Jews, and 19% belonged to the Ukrainian Greek Catholic Church. Linguistically, 86% of the city's population used the Polish language and 11% preferred Ruthenian.

In 1773, the first newspaper in Lemberg, Gazette de Leopoli, began to be published. In 1784, a Latin language university was opened with lectures in German, Polish and Ruthenian; after closing in 1805, it was reopened in 1817. By 1825, German became the sole language of instruction. Lemberg University was opened by Maria Theresa in 1784. By 1787, her successor Joseph II, Holy Roman Emperor opened "Studium Ruthenum" for students who did not know enough Latin to take regular courses.

During the 19th century, the Austrian administration attempted to Germanise the city's educational and governmental institutions. A number of cultural organisations which did not have a pro-German orientation were closed. After the revolutions of 1848, the language of instruction at the university shifted from German to include Ukrainian and Polish. Around that time, a certain sociolect developed in the city known as the Lwów dialect. Considered to be a type of Polish dialect, it draws its roots from a number of other languages besides Polish. In 1853, kerosene lamps as street lighting were introduced by Ignacy Łukasiewicz and Jan Zeh. Then in 1858, these were updated to gas lamps, and in 1900 to electric ones.

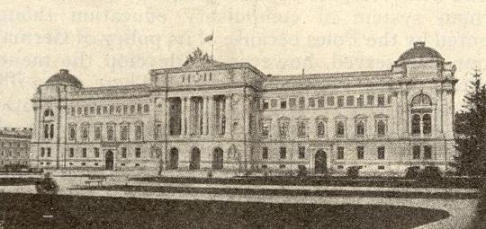
The Galician Sejm (until 1918), since 1920 the Jan Kazimierz University

After the so-called "Ausgleich" of February 1867, the Austrian Empire was reformed into a dualist Austria-Hungary and a slow yet steady process of liberalisation of Austrian rule in Galicia started. From 1873, Galicia was de facto an autonomous province of Austria-Hungary, with Polish and Ruthenian as official languages. Germanisation was halted and censorship lifted as well. Galicia was subject to the Austrian part of the Dual Monarchy, but the Galician Sejm and provincial administration, both established in Lviv, had extensive privileges and prerogatives, especially in education, culture, and local affairs. In 1894, the General National Exhibition was held in Lviv. The city started to grow rapidly, becoming the fourth largest in Austria-Hungary, according to the census of 1910. Multiple Belle Époque public edifices and tenement houses were erected, with a number of the buildings from the Austrian period, such as the Lviv Theatre of Opera and Ballet, built in the Viennese neo-Renaissance style.

At that time, Lviv was home to a number of renowned Polish-language institutions, such as the Ossolineum, with the second-largest collection of Polish books in the world, the Polish Academy of Arts, the National Museum (since 1908), the Historical Museum of the City of Lwów (since 1891), the Polish Copernicus Society of Naturalists, the Polish Historical Society, Lwów University, with Polish as the official language since 1882, the Lwów Scientific Society, the Lwów Art Gallery, the Polish Theatre, and the Polish Archdiocese.

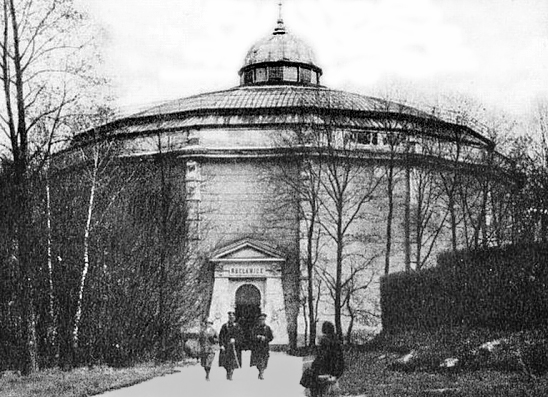
The Racławice Panorama opened in 1894

Furthermore, Lviv was the centre of a number of Polish independence organisations. In June 1908, Józef Piłsudski, Władysław Sikorski and Kazimierz Sosnkowski founded the Union of Active Struggle in the city. Two years later, the paramilitary organisation, called the Riflemen's Association, was also founded in the city by Polish activists.

At the same time, Lviv became the city where famous Ukrainian writers (such as Ivan Franko, Panteleimon Kulish and Ivan Nechuy-Levytsky) published their work. It was a centre of Ukrainian cultural revival. The city also housed the largest and most influential Ukrainian institutions in the world, including the Prosvita society dedicated to spreading literacy in the Ukrainian language, the Shevchenko Scientific Society, the Dniester Insurance Company and base of the Ukrainian cooperative movement, and it served as the seat of the Ukrainian Catholic Church. However, the Polish-dominated city council blocked Ukrainian attempts to create visible monuments for their own. The most important streets had names referring to Polish history and literature, and only minor roads referred to Ukrainians.

Lviv was also a major centre of Jewish culture, in particular as a centre of the Yiddish language, and was the home of the world's first Yiddish-language daily newspaper, the Lemberger Togblat, established in 1904.

==== World War I ====
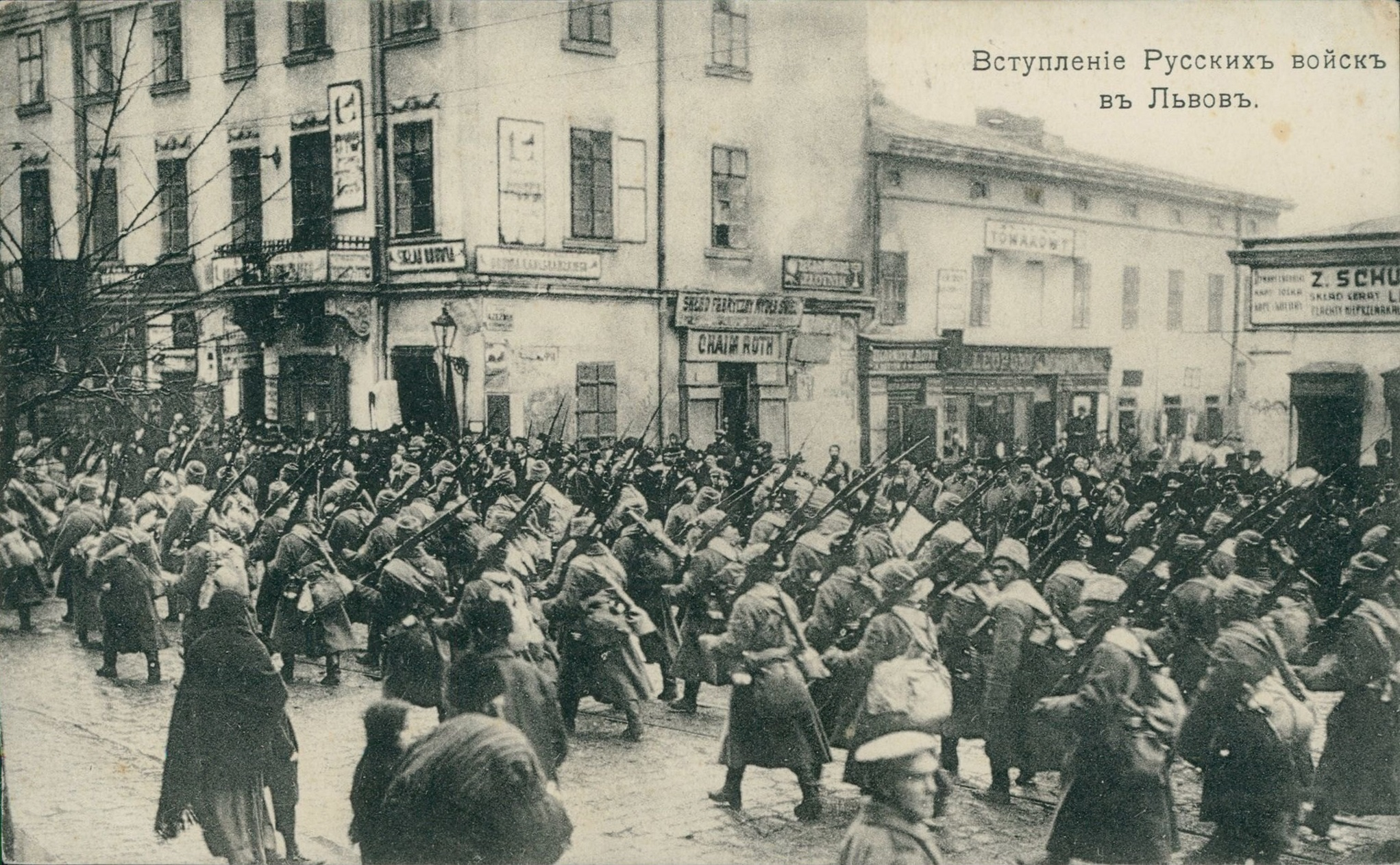
Russian army entering Lviv in 1914

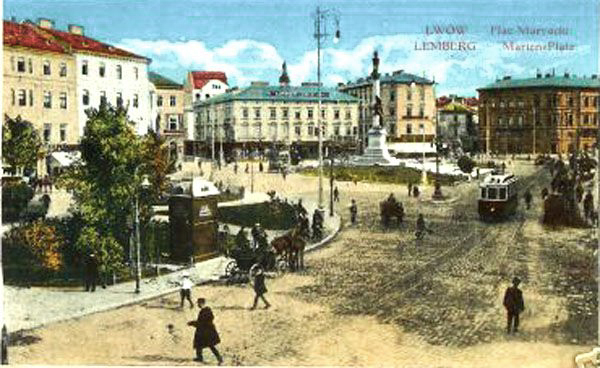
Lemberg (Lviv, Lwów) in 1915

In the Battle of Galicia at the early stages of the First World War, Lviv was captured by the Russian army in September 1914 following the Battle of Gnila Lipa. The Lemberg Fortress fell on 3 September. The historian Pál Kelemen provided a first-hand account of the chaotic evacuation of the city by the Austro-Hungarian Army and civilians alike.

The town was retaken by Austria-Hungary in June of the following year during the Gorlice–Tarnów offensive. Lviv and its population, therefore, suffered greatly during the First World War as many of the offensives were fought across its local geography causing significant collateral damage and disruption.

=== Polish–Ukrainian War ===
After the collapse of the Habsburg Monarchy at the end of the First World War, Lviv became an arena of battle between the local Polish population and the Ukrainian Sich Riflemen. Both nations perceived the city as an integral part of their new statehoods which at that time were forming in the former Austrian territories. On the night of 31 October – 1 November 1918 the Western Ukrainian People's Republic was proclaimed with Lviv as its capital. 2,300 Ukrainian soldiers from the Ukrainian Sich Riflemen (Sichovi Striltsi), which had previously been a corps in the Austrian Army, made an attempt to take over Lviv. The city's Polish majority opposed the Ukrainian declaration and began to fight against the Ukrainian troops. During this combat an important role was taken by young Polish city defenders called Lwów Eaglets.

The Ukrainian forces withdrew outside Lwów's confines by 21 November 1918, after which elements of Polish soldiers began to loot and burn much of the Jewish and Ukrainian quarters of the city, killing approximately 340 civilians (see: Lwów pogrom). The pogromists were tried by Polish authorities and three were executed. The retreating Ukrainian forces besieged the city. The Sich riflemen reformed into the Ukrainian Galician Army (UHA). The Polish forces aided from central Poland, including General Haller's Blue Army, equipped by the French, relieved the besieged city in May 1919 forcing the UHA to the east.

Despite Entente mediation attempts to cease hostilities and reach a compromise between belligerents the Polish–Ukrainian War continued until July 1919 when the last UHA forces withdrew east of the River Zbruch. The border on the River Zbruch was confirmed at the Treaty of Warsaw, when in April 1920 Field Marshal Piłsudski signed an agreement with Symon Petlura where it was agreed that in exchange for military support against the Bolsheviks the Ukrainian People's Republic renounced its claims to the territories of Eastern Galicia.

In August 1920, Lviv was attacked by the Red Army under the command of Aleksandr Yegorov and Stalin during the Polish–Soviet War but the city repelled the attack. For the courage of its inhabitants Lviv was awarded the Virtuti Militari cross by Józef Piłsudski on 22 November 1920.

On 23 February 1921, the council of the League of Nations declared that Galicia (including the city) lay outside the territory of Poland and that Poland did not have the mandate to establish administrative control in that country, and that Poland was merely the occupying military power of Galicia (as a whole), whose sovereign remained the Allied Powers and fate would be determined by the Council of Ambassadors at the League of Nations. On 14 March 1923, the Council of Ambassadors decided that Galicia would be incorporated into Poland "whereas it is recognised by Poland that ethnographical conditions necessitate an autonomous regime in the Eastern part of Galicia." This provision was never honoured by the interwar Polish government. After 1923, the region was internationally recognized as part of the Polish state.

=== Interwar period ===
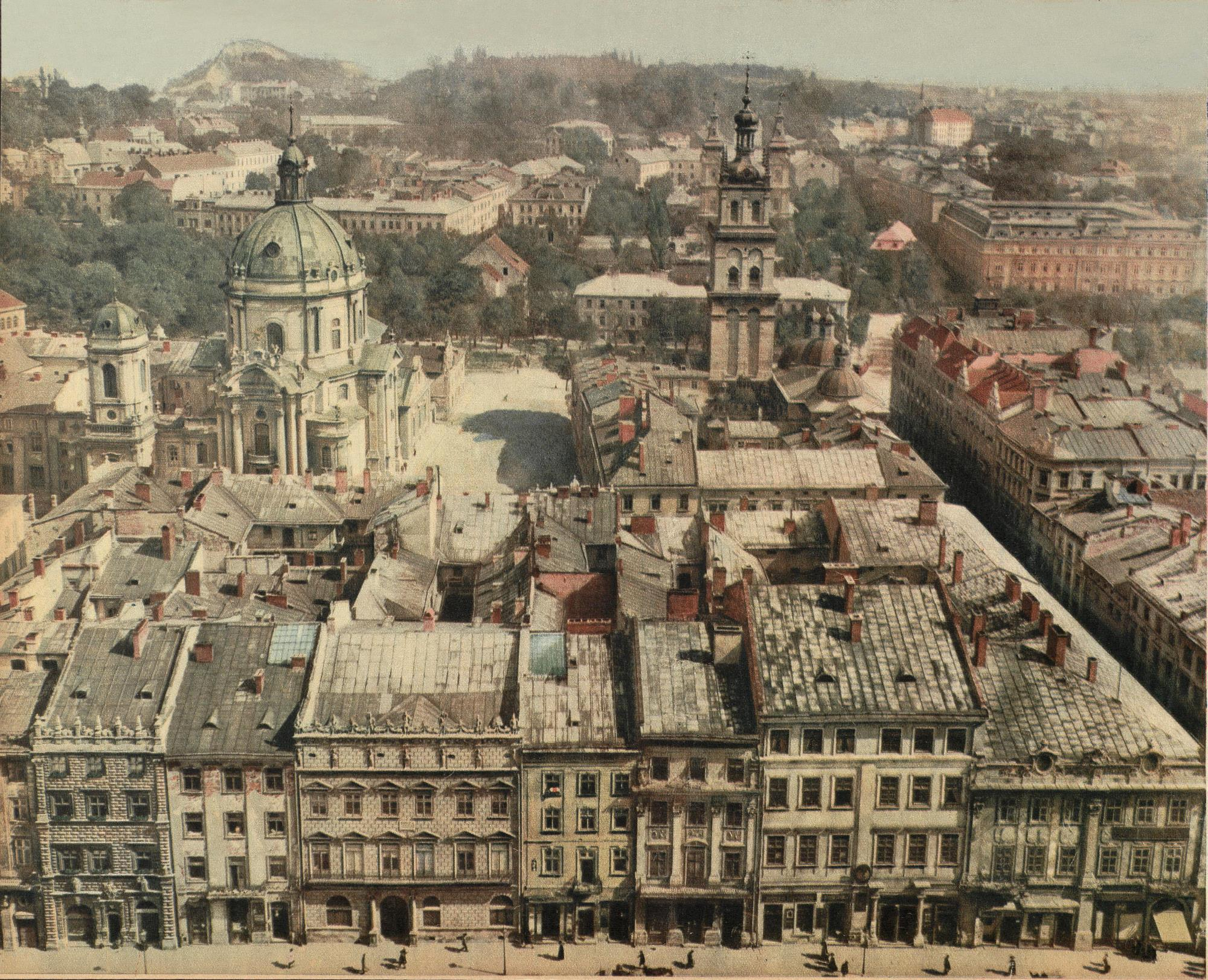
A panorama of Lwów before 1924

During the interwar period Lwów was the Second Polish Republic's third-most populous city (following Warsaw and Łódź), and it became the seat of the Lwów Voivodeship. Following Warsaw, Lwów was the second most important cultural and academic centre of interwar Poland, housing among others the Lwów School of Mathematics, the Lwów Historical School, and the Lwów School of Economics. In 1920 Professor Rudolf Weigl of Lwów University developed a vaccine against typhus fever. Furthermore, the geographic location of Lwów gave it an important role in stimulating international trade and fostering the city's and Poland's economic development. A major trade fair named Targi Wschodnie was established in 1921. In the academic year 1937–1938, there were 9,100 students attending five institutions of higher education, including Lwów University as well as the Polytechnic.

While about two-thirds of the city's inhabitants were Poles, some of whom spoke the characteristic Lwów dialect, the eastern part of the Lwów Voivodeship had a relative Ukrainian majority in most of its rural areas. Polish authorities were obliged through international agreements to provide Eastern Galicia with autonomy (including the creation of a separate Ukrainian university in Lwów), and even though a bill was enacted the Polish Sejm in September 1922, this was not fulfilled.

The Polish government discontinued multiple Ukrainian schools which functioned during the Austrian rule, and closed down Ukrainian departments at the University of Lwów with the exception of one. Prewar Lwów also had a large and thriving Jewish community, which constituted about a quarter of the population, but were accused of having collaborated with the Ukrainians.

Unlike in Austrian times, when the size and number of public parades or other cultural expressions corresponded to each cultural group's relative population, the Polish government emphasised the Polish nature of the city and limited public displays of Jewish and Ukrainian culture. Military parades and commemorations of battles at particular streets within the city, all celebrating the Polish forces who fought against the Ukrainians in 1918, became frequent, and in the 1930s a vast memorial monument and burial ground of Polish soldiers from that conflict was built in the city's Lychakiv Cemetery. On the other hand, Ukrainians strove to create their own memorial culture in the town. An underground military organization attacked Polish institutions, as well as Polish politicians.

=== World War II ===
==== Soviet occupation and incorporation ====
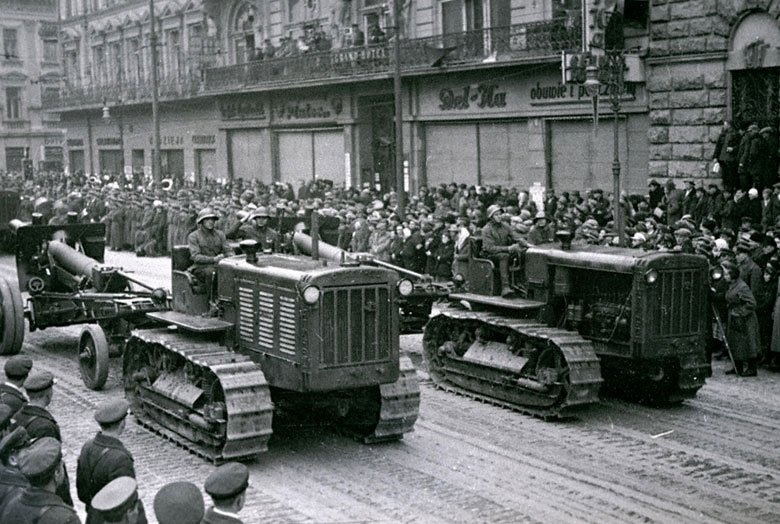
Red Army parade in Lviv following the city's occupation in 1939

Germany invaded Poland on 1 September 1939 and by 14 September Lwów was completely encircled by German Army units. Subsequently, the Soviets invaded Poland on 17 September. On 22 September 1939 Lwów capitulated to the Red Army. The USSR annexed the eastern half of the Second Polish Republic with Ukrainian and Belarusian populations. The city became the capital of the newly formed Lviv Oblast. The Soviets reopened uni-lingual Ukrainian schools, which had been discontinued by the Polish government.

The only change over imposed by the Soviets was the language of instruction, with the actual net loss of about 1,000 schools in short order. Ukrainian was made compulsory in the University of Lviv with almost all its books in Polish. It became thoroughly Ukrainized and was renamed after Ukrainian writer Ivan Franko. Polish academics were laid off. Soviet rule turned out to be much more oppressive than Polish rule; the rich world of Ukrainian publications in Polish Lwów, for instance, was gone in Soviet Lviv, and multiple journalism jobs were lost with it.

==== German occupation ====
On 22 June 1941, Nazi Germany and several of its allies invaded the USSR. In the initial stage of Operation Barbarossa (30 June 1941) Lviv was taken by the Germans. The evacuating Soviets killed most of the prison population, with arriving Wehrmacht forces easily discovering evidence of the Soviet mass murders in the city committed by the NKVD and NKGB. The German administration falsely blamed the massacres on Jews, contributing to the start of pogroms against the city's Jewish community. On 30 June 1941 Yaroslav Stetsko proclaimed in Lviv the Government of an independent Ukrainian state allied with Nazi Germany. This was done without preapproval from the Germans and after 15 September 1941, the organisers were arrested.

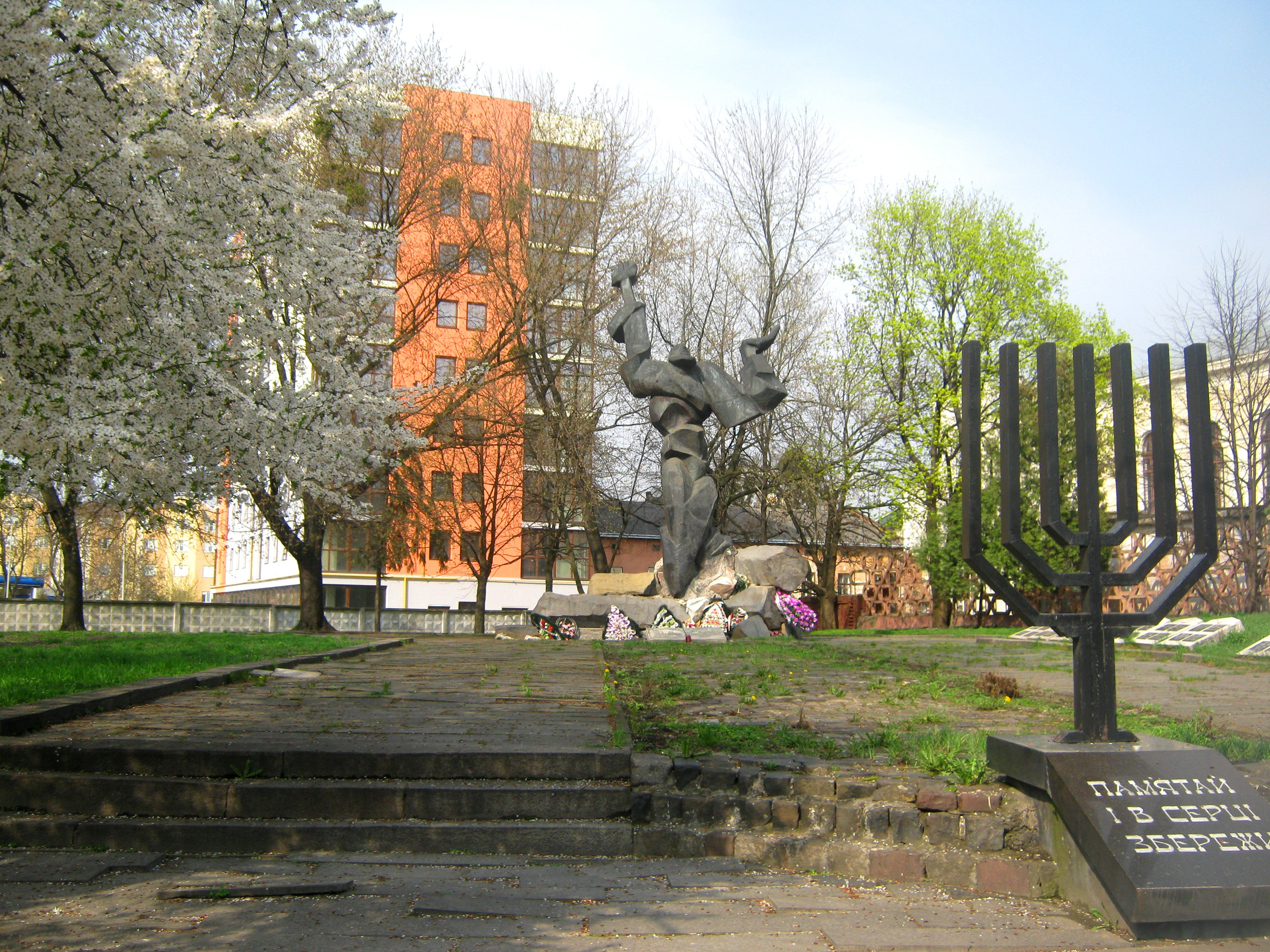
Memorial to Lviv ghetto victims of the Holocaust, erected in 1992 on Chornovola Street. The inscription reads "remember and keep in your heart".

The Sikorski–Mayski Agreement signed in London on 30 July 1941 between the Polish government-in-exile and the Soviet government invalidated the September 1939 Soviet-German partition of Poland, as the Soviets declared it null and void. Meanwhile, German-occupied Eastern Galicia at the beginning of August 1941 was incorporated into the General Government as Distrikt Galizien with Lviv as the district's capital. German policy towards the Polish population in this area was as harsh as in the rest of the General Government.

During the occupation of the city, the Germans committed multiple atrocities, including the killing of Polish university professors in 1941. German Nazis viewed the Ukrainian Galicians, former inhabitants of Austrian Crown Land, as more aryanised and civilised than the Ukrainian population living in the territories belonging to the USSR before 1939. As a result, they escaped the full extent of German acts in comparison to Ukrainians who lived to the east, in the German-occupied Soviet Ukraine turned into the Reichskommissariat Ukraine.

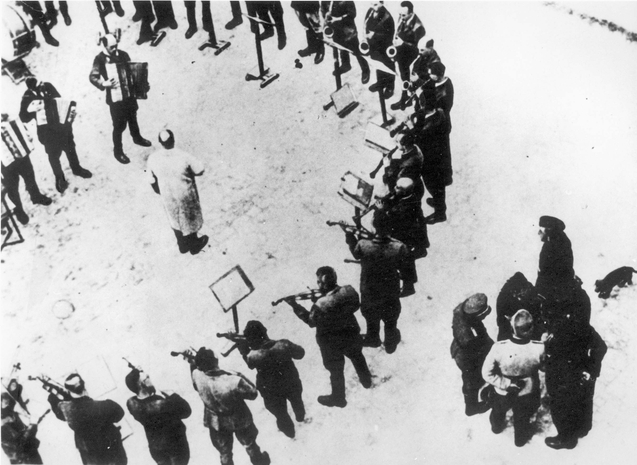
The imprisoned Tango of Death orchestra

According to the Third Reich's racial policies, local Jews then became the main target of German repressions in the region. Following the German occupation, the Jewish population was concentrated in the Lwów Ghetto established in the city's Zamarstynów (today Zamarstyniv) district and the Janowska concentration camp was also set up. In the Janowska concentration camp, the Nazis conducted torture and executions to music. The Lviv National Opera members, who were prisoners, played one and the same tune, Tango of Death.

On the eve of Lviv's liberation, German Nazis ordered 40 orchestra musicians to form a circle. The security ringed the musicians tightly and ordered them to play. First, the orchestra conductor, Mund, was executed. Then the commandant ordered the musicians to come to the centre of the circle one by one, put their instruments onto the ground and strip naked, after which they were killed by a headshot. A photo of the orchestra players was one of the incriminating documents at the Nuremberg trials.

In 1931 there were 75,316 Yiddish-speaking inhabitants, but by 1941 approximately 100,000 Jews were present in Lviv. The majority of these Jews were either killed within the city or deported to Belzec extermination camp. In the summer of 1943, on the orders of Heinrich Himmler, SS-Standartenführer Paul Blobel was tasked with the destruction of any evidence of Nazi mass murders in the Lviv area. On 15 June Blobel, using forced labourers from Janowska, dug up a number of mass graves and incinerated the remains.

Later, on 19 November 1943, inmates at Janowska staged an uprising and attempted a mass escape. A few succeeded, but most were recaptured and killed. The SS staff and their local auxiliaries then, at the time of the Janowska camp's liquidation, murdered at least 6,000 more inmates, as well as the Jews in other forced labour camps in Galicia. By the end of the war, the Jewish population of the city was virtually eliminated, with only around 200 to 800 survivors remaining.

=== Soviet period ===
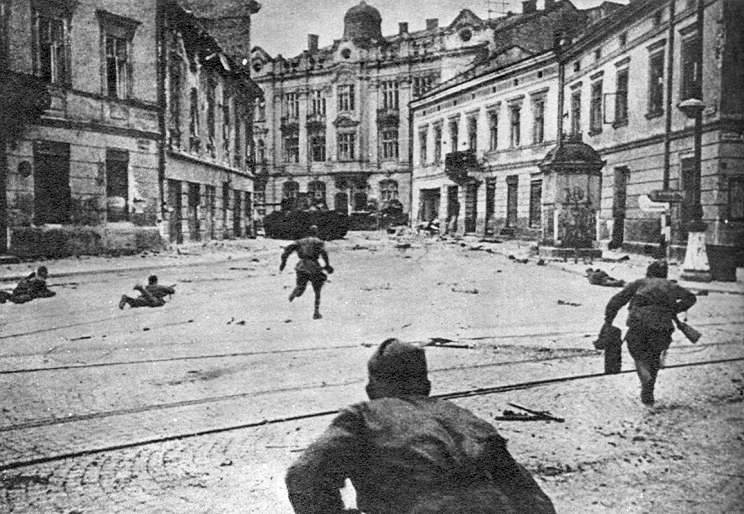
Soviet soldiers in Lviv, July 1944

After the war, despite Polish efforts, the city remained as part of the Ukrainian Soviet Socialist Republic. During the Yalta Conference Soviet General Secretary Joseph Stalin demanded to keep the territory the Soviet Union annexed during its invasion of Poland at the beginning of the war. Although U.S. President Franklin D. Roosevelt wanted to allow Poland to keep Lviv, he and British Prime Minister Winston Churchill reluctantly agreed. Most of the remaining Polish population was expelled to the Polish territories gained from Germany (especially to present day Wrocław) whose German population was respectively expelled or fled in fear of Soviet retribution.

Migrants from Ukrainian-speaking rural areas around the city, as well as from other parts of the Soviet Union arrived, attracted by the city's rapidly growing industrial needs. This population transfer altered the traditional ethnic composition of the city, which was already drastically changed as the Polish, Jewish and German population was displaced or murdered.

With Russification being a general Soviet policy in post-war Ukraine, in Lviv it was combined with the disestablishment of the Ukrainian Greek Catholic Church (see History of Christianity in Ukraine) at the state-sponsored Synod of Lviv, which agreed to transfer all parishes to the recently recreated Ukrainian Exarchate of the Russian Orthodox Church. However, after the death of Joseph Stalin, Soviet cultural policies were relaxed, allowing Lviv, the major centre of Western Ukraine to become a major hub of Ukrainian culture.

In the 1950s and 1960s, the city significantly expanded both in population and size. A number of prominent plants and factories were established or moved from eastern parts of the USSR, together with the worforce. The latter resulted in partial Russification of the city. Among the most notable plants were the bus factory (Lvivsky Avtomobilny Zavod), which produced most of the buses in the Soviet Union and employed upwards of 30,000, TV factory Elektron which made one of the most popular brand of television sets in the country, the front-end loader factory (Avto-Pogruzchik), the Progress shoe factory, confectionery Svitoch, and many others. Each of these employed tens of thousands of workers and were among the largest employers in the region. Most of them survive to this day, although economic difficulties put a drain on their production figures.

In the period of liberalisation from the Soviet system in the 1980s, the city became the centre of political movements advocating Ukrainian independence from the USSR.

=== Independent Ukraine ===
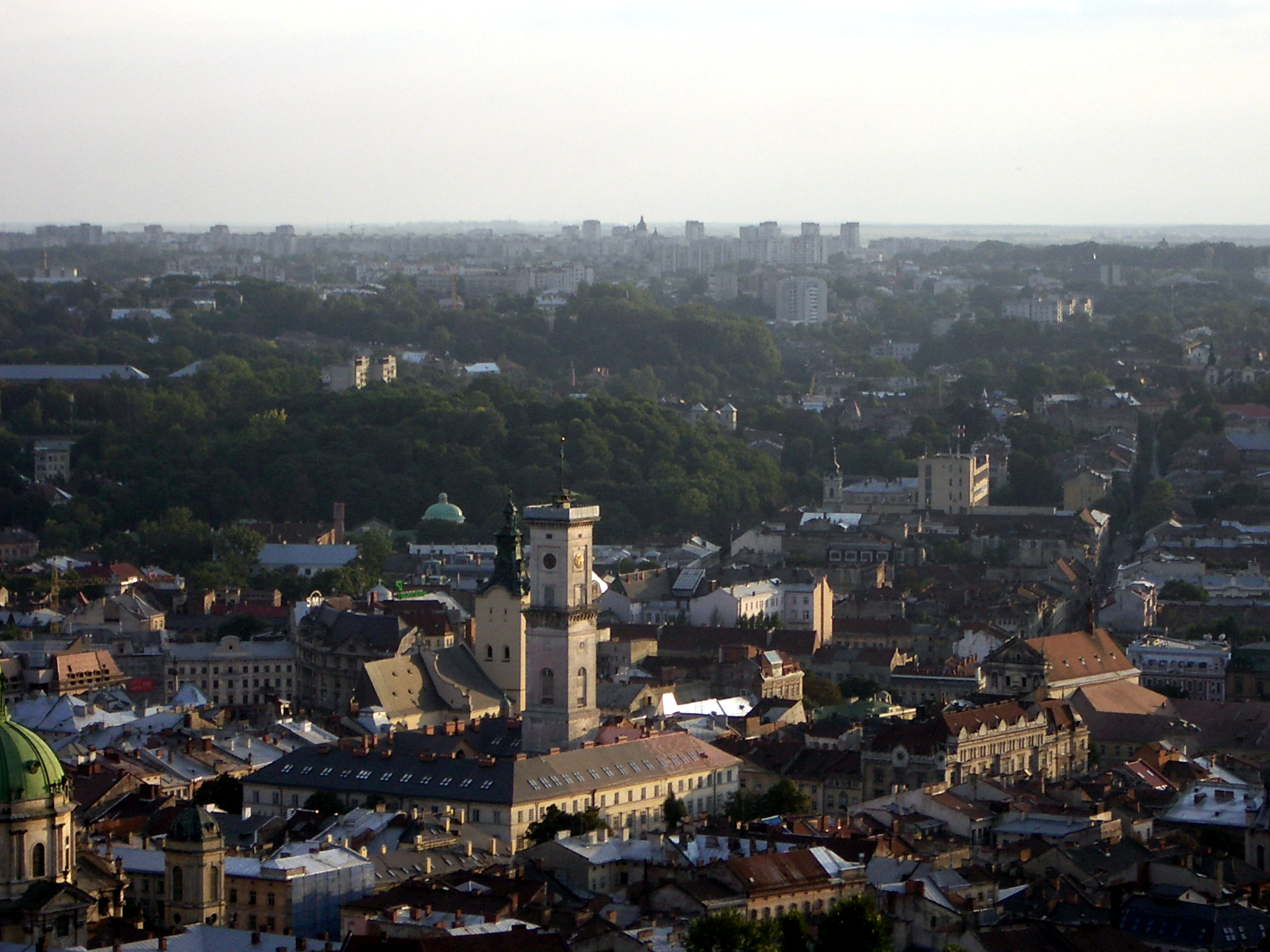
Lviv City Hall as seen from High Castle

With the dissolution of the Soviet Union in 1991, Lviv became part of the newly independent Ukraine, serving as the capital of the Lviv Oblast. Lviv remains today one of the main centres of Ukrainian culture and the origin of much of the nation's political class.

In its recent history, Lviv strongly supported Viktor Yushchenko during the 2004 Ukrainian presidential election and played a key role in the Orange Revolution. Hundreds of thousands of people would gather in freezing temperature to demonstrate for the Orange camp. Acts of civil disobedience forced the head of the local police to resign and the local assembly issued a resolution refusing to accept the fraudulent first official results.

In support of the Euromaidan movement, Lviv's executive committee declared itself independent of the rule of President Viktor Yanukovych on 19 February 2014.

==== Russo-Ukrainian War ====
Since the 2022 Russian invasion of Ukraine, Lviv has been hit by repeated missile and aerial attacks by the Russian military. Military targets and infrastructure targets were attacked, but there were victims among civilian population and some residential buildings were hit.

== Geography ==
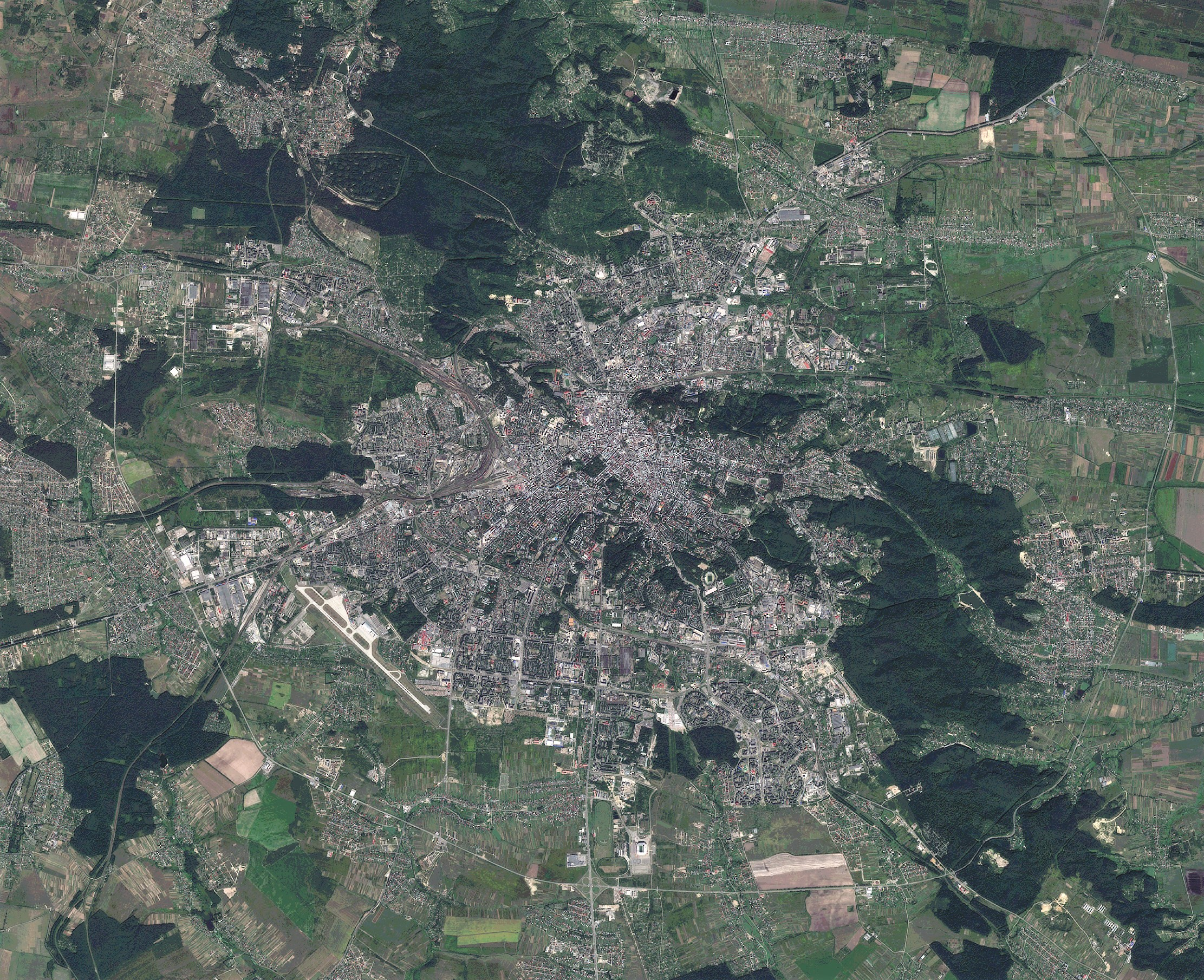
A satellite view of Lviv (Sentinel-2, 14 August 2017)

Lviv is on the edge of the Roztochia Upland, about 70 kilometres (43 miles) east of the Polish border and 160 km (99 mi) north of the eastern Carpathian Mountains. The average altitude of Lviv is 296 metres (971 feet) above sea level. Its highest point is the Vysokyi Zamok (High Castle), 409 meters (1,342 feet) above sea level. This castle has a commanding view of the historic city centre with its distinctive, green-domed churches and intricate architecture.

The old walled city was at the foothills of the High Castle on the banks of the Poltva River. In the 13th century, the river was used to transport goods. In the early 20th century, the Poltva was covered over in areas where it flows through the city; the river flows directly beneath Lviv's central street, Liberty Avenue, and the Lviv Theatre of Opera and Ballet.

=== Climate ===
Lviv's climate is humid continental (Köppen climate classification Dfb) with cold winters and warm summers. The average temperatures are −3 °C (27 °F) in January and 18 °C (64 °F) in July. Average humidity level is dry, with summer humidity ranging from comfortable to muggy. The average annual rainfall is 745 mm (29 in) with the maximum in summer. Mean sunshine duration per year at Lviv is about 1,804 hours.

Climate data for Lviv (1991–2020, extremes 1936–present)
Month	Jan	Feb	Mar	Apr	May	Jun	Jul	Aug	Sep	Oct	Nov	Dec	Year
Record high °C (°F)	14.9 (58.8)	17.9 (64.2)	23.5 (74.3)	28.9 (84.0)	32.2 (90.0)	37.4 (99.3)	36.3 (97.3)	37.3 (99.1)	34.5 (94.1)	25.6 (78.1)	21.6 (70.9)	16.5 (61.7)	37.4 (99.3)
Mean daily maximum °C (°F)	0.2 (32.4)	2.0 (35.6)	7.0 (44.6)	14.5 (58.1)	19.5 (67.1)	23.0 (73.4)	24.7 (76.5)	24.5 (76.1)	19.0 (66.2)	13.2 (55.8)	6.8 (44.2)	1.5 (34.7)	13.0 (55.4)
Daily mean °C (°F)	−2.7 (27.1)	−1.5 (29.3)	2.5 (36.5)	9.0 (48.2)	13.8 (56.8)	17.3 (63.1)	19.0 (66.2)	18.5 (65.3)	13.5 (56.3)	8.4 (47.1)	3.3 (37.9)	−1.3 (29.7)	8.3 (46.9)
Mean daily minimum °C (°F)	−5.7 (21.7)	−4.8 (23.4)	−1.4 (29.5)	3.8 (38.8)	8.4 (47.1)	12.0 (53.6)	13.7 (56.7)	13.2 (55.8)	8.7 (47.7)	4.4 (39.9)	0.4 (32.7)	−4.1 (24.6)	4.1 (39.4)
Record low °C (°F)	−28.5 (−19.3)	−29.5 (−21.1)	−25.0 (−13.0)	−12.1 (10.2)	−5.0 (23.0)	0.5 (32.9)	4.5 (40.1)	2.6 (36.7)	−3.0 (26.6)	−13.2 (8.2)	−17.6 (0.3)	−25.6 (−14.1)	−29.5 (−21.1)
Average precipitation mm (inches)	46 (1.8)	48 (1.9)	48 (1.9)	52 (2.0)	93 (3.7)	86 (3.4)	96 (3.8)	73 (2.9)	70 (2.8)	57 (2.2)	50 (2.0)	50 (2.0)	769 (30.3)
Average extreme snow depth cm (inches)	7 (2.8)	9 (3.5)	4 (1.6)	0 (0)	0 (0)	0 (0)	0 (0)	0 (0)	0 (0)	0 (0)	1 (0.4)	4 (1.6)	9 (3.5)
Average rainy days	9	9	11	14	16	17	16	14	14	14	13	11	158
Average snowy days	17	17	11	3	0.1	0	0	0	0	1	8	15	72
Average relative humidity (%)	83.3	80.7	74.5	67.1	70.4	72.6	74.1	74.3	78.2	80.3	84.4	85.0	77.1
Mean monthly sunshine hours	64	79	112	188	227	238	254	222	179	148	56	37	1,804
Source 1: Pogoda.ru.net
Source 2: NOAA (humidity 1991–2020, sun 1961–1990)

== Administrative divisions ==
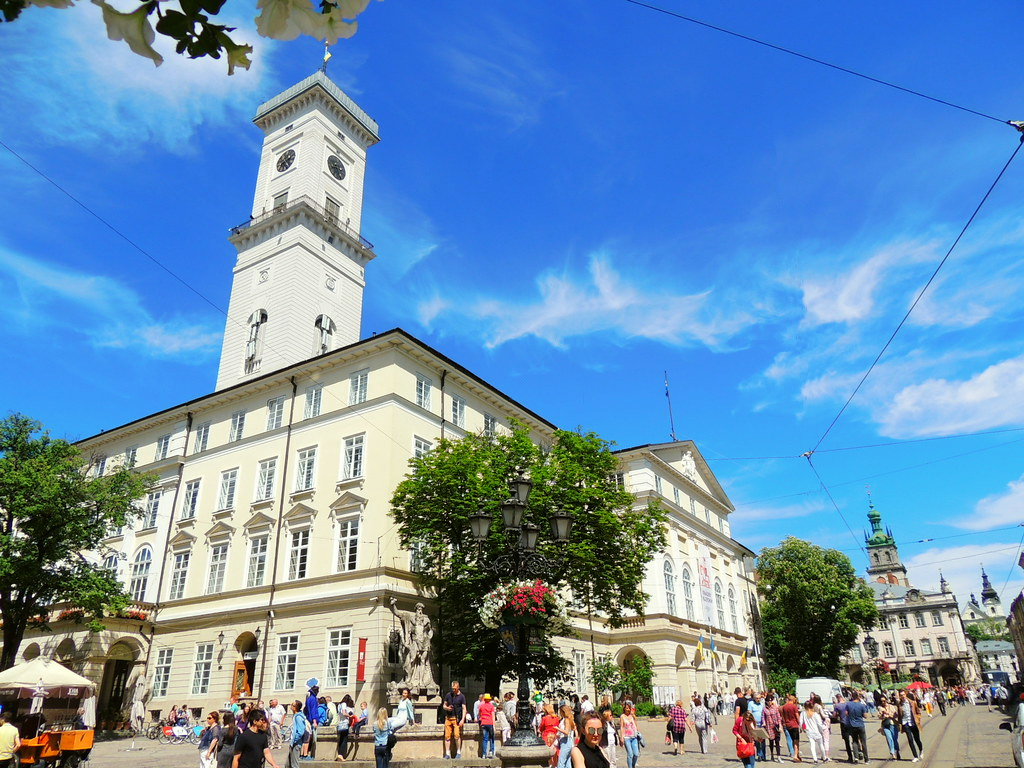
Lviv City Hall

Lviv is divided into six urban districts (raions), each with its own administrative bodies:

- Halytskyi District (Галицький район), named after Daniel of Galicia (Danylo Halytskyi).
- Zaliznychnyi District (Залізничний район), literally "railway neighborhood"
- Lychakivskyi District (Личаківський район)
- Sykhivskyi District (Сихівський район)
- Frankivskyi District (Франківський район), named after Ivan Franko.
- Shevchenkivskyi District (Шевченківський район), named after Taras Shevchenko.

Notable suburbs include Vynnyky (Винники), Briukhovychi (Брюховичі), and Rudno (Рудно).

== Demographics ==
Historical population
Year	Pop.	±%
1300	3,000	—
1405	5,100	+70.0%
1544	5,700	+11.8%
1776	29,500	+417.5%
1840	67,000	+127.1%
1850	80,000	+19.4%
1869	87,109	+8.9%
1890	127,943	+46.9%
1900	159,877	+25.0%
1910	206,100	+28.9%
1921	219,388	+6.4%
1931	312,231	+42.3%
1939	340,000	+8.9%
1959	410,678	+20.8%
1970	553,452	+34.8%
1979	667,243	+20.6%
1989	790,908	+18.5%
2001	732,818	−7.3%
2011	732,009	−0.1%
2022	717,273	−2.0%
2025	723,403	+0.9%

Lviv residents live 75 years on average, and this age is 7 years longer than the average age in Ukraine and 8 years more than the world average (68 years). In 2010 the average life expectancy was 71 among men and 79.5 years among women. The fertility rates have been steadily increasing between 2001 and 2010; however, the effects of low fertility in the previous years remained noticeable even though the birth rates grew. However, there is an acute shortage of young people under the age of 25. In 2011, 13.7% of Lviv's population consisted of young people under 15 years and 17.6% of persons aged 60 years and over.

=== Historical populations ===
Population structure by religion 1869–1931
Community	1869	1890	1900	1910	1921	1931
Roman Catholic	53.1%	52.6%	51.7%	51%	51%	50.4%
Jewish	30.6%	28.2%	27.7%	28%	35%	31.9%
Greek Catholic	14.2%	17.1%	18.3%	19%	12%	15.9%

Population makeup by ethnicity 1900–2001
Ethnicity	1900	1921	1931	1944	1950	1959	1979	1989	2001
Ukrainians	19.9%	9.1%	11.2%	26.4%	49.9%	60.0%	74.0%	79.1%	88.1%
Russians	0.0%	0.2%	0.2%	5.5%	31.2%	27.0%	19.3%	16.1%	8.9%
Jews	26.5%	27.6%	24.1%		6.4%	6.0%	2.7%	1.6%	0.3%
Poles	49.4%	62.2%	63.5%	63%	10.3%	4.0%	1.8%	1.2%	0.9%

Ethnicity in Lviv according to censuses of 1989 and 2001 respectively
Ukrainians	622,800	79.1%	88.1%
Russians	126,418	16.1%	8.9%
Jews	12,837	1.6%	0.3%
Poles	9,697	1.2%	0.9%
Belarusians	5,800	0.7%	0.4%
Armenians	1,000	0.1%	0.1%
Total	778,557		
Numbers do not include regions nor the surrounding towns.

- late 13th–early 14th century: 2,000–3,000 inhabitants (Ruthenians, Germans, Tatars, Karaites, Hungarians, Jews)
- Year 1405: approx. 4,500 inhabitants in the Old Town, and additionally approx. 600 in the two suburbs.
- Year 1544: approx. 3,000 inhabitants in the Old Town (number had decreased by about 30% due to the fire of 1527), and additionally approx. 2,700 in the suburbs.
- Year 1776: 29,500 inhabitants
- Year 1840: approx. 67,000 inhabitants, including 20,000 Jews.
- Year 1850: nearly 80,000 inhabitants (together with the four suburbs), including more than 25,000 Jews.
- Year 1869: 87,109 inhabitants, among them 46,252 Roman Catholics, 26,694 Jews, 12,406 members of the Greek Uniate Churches.
- Year 1890: 127,943 inhabitants (64,102 male, 63,481 female), among them 67,280 Catholics, 36,130 Judaic, 21,876 members of the Greek Uniate Churches, 2,061 Protestants, 596 Orthodox and others.
- Year 1900: 159,877 inhabitants, including the military (10,326 men). Of these inhabitants, 82,597 were members of the Roman Catholic Church, 29,327 members of the Greek Uniate Churches, and 44,258 were Jews. As their language of communication, 120,634 used Polish, 20,409 German or Yiddish, and 15,159 Ukrainian.
- Year 1921: 219,388 inhabitants, including 136,519 Poles, 60,431 Jews and 19,866 Ukrainians.
- Year 1931: 312,231 inhabitants, including 198,212 Poles, 75,316 Jews and 35,137 Ukrainians.
- Year 1939: 340.000 inhabitants.
- Year 1940: 500,000.
- July 1944: 149,000.
- Year 1955: 380,000.
- Year 2001: 725,000 inhabitants, of whom 88% were Ukrainians, 9% Russians and 1% Poles. A further 200,000 people commuted daily from suburbs.
- Year 2007: 735,000 inhabitants. By gender: 51.5% women, and 48.5% men. By place of birth: 56% born in Lviv, 19% born in Lviv Oblast, 11% born in East Ukraine, 7% born in the former republics of the USSR (Russia 4%), 4% born in Poland, and 3% born in Western Ukraine, but not in the Lviv Oblast.
- Religious adherence: (2001)
  - 52% Ukrainian Greek Catholic Church
  - 31% Ukrainian Orthodox Church – Kyiv Patriarchate
  - 5% Ukrainian Autocephalous Orthodox Church
  - 3% Ukrainian Orthodox Church (Moscow Patriarchate)
  - 3% Other faiths

=== Language ===
Language use throughout 20th century
Language	1931	1970	1979	1989
Ukrainian	11.3%	65.2%	71.3%	77.2%
Russian	0.1%	31.1%	25.7%	19.9%
Yiddish	24.1%			
Polish	63.5%			
Other	1.0%	3.7%	3.0%	2.9%

The majority of Lvivians speak Ukrainian. The use of Ukrainian in the city has surged since the 1970s, while the use of Russian has declined since the 1980s. In 2000, it was estimated that 80% of Lvivians spoke Ukrainian.

Results of the 2001 census:

Language	Number	Percentage
Ukrainian	641 688	88.48%
Russian	72 125	9.95%
Other or undecided	11 389	1.57%
Total	725 202	100.00%

According to one survey conducted by the International Republican Institute in mid-2023, 96% of the city's inhabitants spoke Ukrainian at home, while 3% of them spoke Russian.

=== Ethnic Polish population ===
Historical Polish population
Year	Poles	%
1921	112,000	51
1989	9,500	1.2
2001	6,400	0.9

Ethnic Poles and the Polish Jews began to settle in Lwów in considerable numbers already in 1349 after the city was conquered by King Casimir of the Piast dynasty. Lwów served as Poland's major cultural and economic centre for several centuries, during the Polish Golden Age, and until the partitions of Poland perpetrated by Russia, Prussia, and Austria. In the Second Polish Republic, the Lwów Voivodeship (inhabited by 2,789,000 people in 1921) grew to 3,126,300 inhabitants in ten years.

As a result of World War II, Lviv was de-Polonised, mainly through Soviet-arranged population exchange in 1944–1946 but also by early deportations to Siberia. Those who remained on their own volition after the border shift became a small ethnic minority in Lviv. By 1959 Poles made up only 4% of the local population. A number of families were mixed. During the Soviet decades only two Polish schools continued to function: No. 10 (with 8 grades) and No. 24 (with 10 grades).

In the 1980s the process of uniting groups into ethnic associations was allowed. In 1988 a Polish-language newspaper was permitted (Gazeta Lwowska). The Polish population of the city continues to use the dialect of the Polish language known as Lwów dialect (Polish: gwara lwowska).

An association of Poles named White Eagle was founded in Lviv in 2011.

=== Jewish population ===
The first known Jews in Lviv date back to the tenth century. The oldest remaining Jewish tombstone dates back to 1348. Apart from the Rabbanite Jews there were many Karaites who had settled in the city after coming from the East and from Byzantium. After Casimir III conquered Lviv in 1349 the Jewish citizens received a number of privileges equal to that of other citizens of Poland. Lviv had two separate Jewish quarters, one within the city walls and one outside on the outskirts of the city. Each had its separate synagogue, although they shared a cemetery, which was also used by the Crimean Karaite community. Before 1939 there were 97 synagogues.

Before the Holocaust about one-third of the city's population was Jewish (more than 140,000 on the eve of World War II). This number swelled to about 240,000 by the end of 1940 as tens of thousands of Jews fled from the Nazi-occupied parts of Poland into the relative (and temporary) sanctuary of Soviet-occupied Poland (including Lviv) following the Molotov–Ribbentrop Pact that divided Poland into Nazi and Soviet zones in 1939. Most of the Jewish population was killed in the Holocaust. Meanwhile, the Nazis also destroyed the Jewish cemetery, which was subsequently "paved over by the Soviets".

Due to the Holocaust and migration, the original Jewish population of the city all but vanished. After the war, the remnant was replenished by a newer Jewish population, formed from among the hundreds of thousands of Russians and Ukrainians who migrated to the city. The post-war Jewish population peaked at 30,000 in the 1970s. Currently, the Jewish population has shrunk considerably as a result of emigration (mainly to Israel and the United States) and, to a lesser degree, assimilation, and is estimated to number a few thousand. A number of organisations continue to be active.

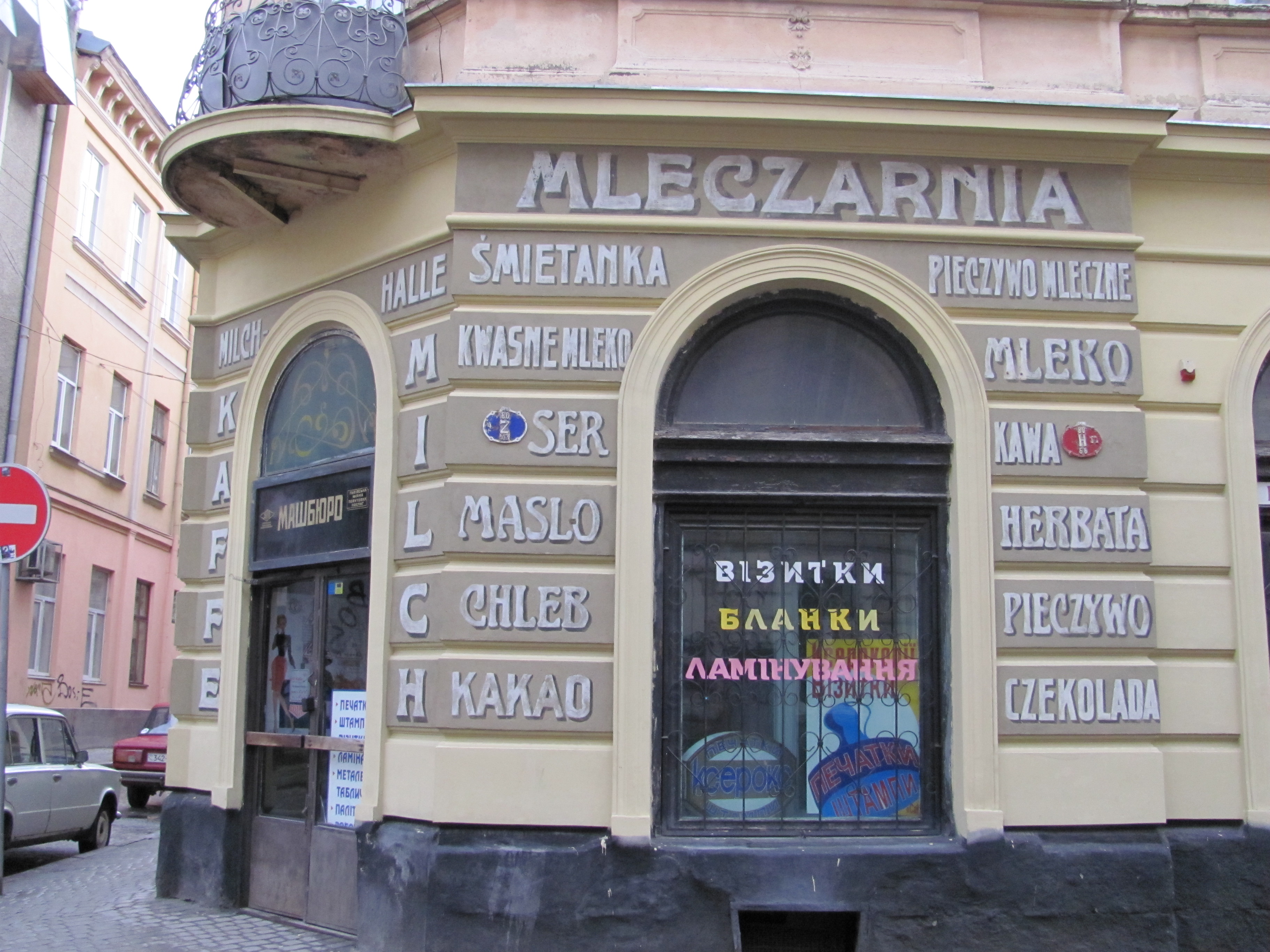
Dairy store "mleczarnia" adverts. One can still find prewar Polish, Yiddish, and German ghost signs around the city.

The Sholem Aleichem Jewish Culture Society in Lviv initiated the construction of a monument to the victims of the ghetto in 1988. On 23 August 1992, the memorial complex to the victims of the Lwów ghetto (1941–1943) was officially opened. During 2011–2012, some antisemitic acts against the memorial took place. On 20 March 2011, it was reported that the slogan "death to the Jews" with a swastika was sprayed on the monument. On 21 March 2012, the memorial was vandalized by unknown individuals, in what seemed to be an antisemitic act.

== Economy ==
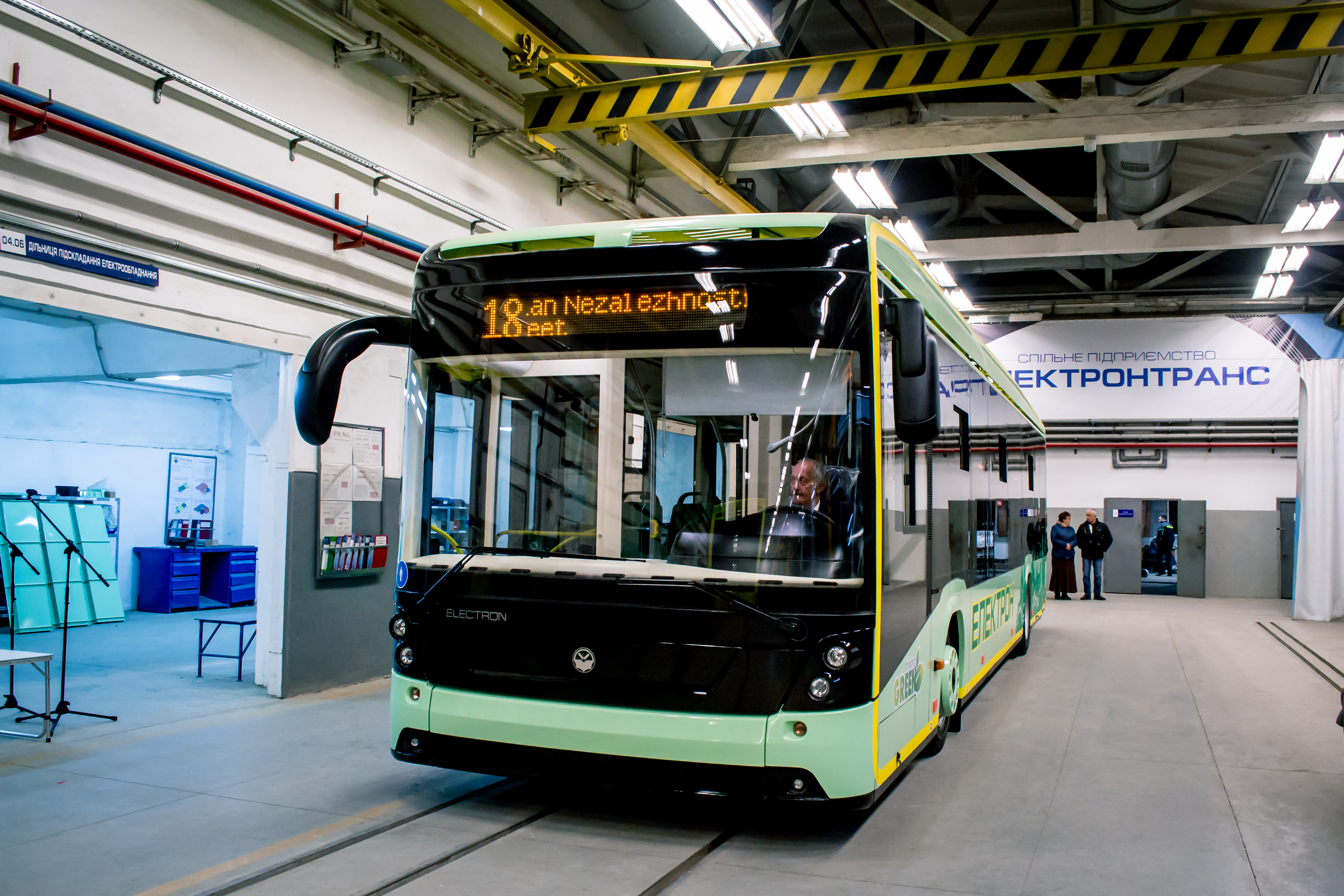
E19101 electric bus – product of the Electron

=== Finances and investment ===
Lviv is the most important business centre of Western Ukraine. As of 1 January 2011, the city has invested 837.1 million US dollars into the economy, accounting for almost two-thirds of total investment in the Lviv region. In 2015, the companies of Lviv received $14.3 million of foreign direct investment; which is however half as much as a year earlier ($30.9 million in 2014). During January–September 2017 the general amount of direct foreign investment received by the local government in Lviv was $52.4 million. According to the statistics administration, foreign capital was invested by 31 countries (some of the main investors: Poland – 47.7%; Australia – 11.3%; Cyprus – 10.7% and the Netherlands – 6%).

The total revenue of the city budget of Lviv for 2015 was set at about UAH 3.81 billion, which was 23% more than a year earlier (UAH 2.91 billion in 2014). As of 10 November 2017, the deputies of the Lviv City Council approved a budget in amount of UAH 5.4 billion ($204 million), most of which (UAH 5.12 billion) was the revenue of the fund of Lviv.

The average wage in Lviv in 2015 in the business sector amounted to 14,041 UAH, in the budget sphere – 9,475 UAH. On 1 February 2014, registered unemployment was 0.6%. Lviv is one of the largest cities in Ukraine and is growing rapidly. According to the Ministry of Economy of Ukraine the monthly average salary in Lviv is a little less than the average for Ukraine which in February 2013 was 6050 UAH ($755). According to the World Bank classification Lviv is a middle-income city. In June 2019, the average wage amounted to 23,000 UAH ($920), which was 18.9% more than in the previous year.

=== Industry and services ===
Lviv has 218 large industrial enterprises, more than 40 commercial banks, 4 exchanges, 13 investment companies, 80 insurance and 24 leasing companies, 77 audit firms and almost 9,000 small ventures. For a number of years machinery-building and electronics were leading industries in Lviv. The city-based public company Electron, trademark of national television sets manufacturing, produces the 32 and 37-inches liquid-crystal TV-sets. The Electrontrans specializes in design and production of modern electric transport including trams, trolleybuses, electric buses, and spare parts. In 2013 Elektrotrans JV started producing low-floor trams, the first Ukrainian 100% low-floor tramways. LAZ is a bus manufacturing company in Lviv with its own rich history. Founded in 1945, LAZ started bus production in the early 1950s. Innovative design ideas of Lviv engineers have become the world standard in bus manufacturing.

The total volume of industrial production sold in 2015 amounted to UAH 24.2 billion, which was 39% more than a year earlier (UAH 14.6 billion in 2014).

There are several banks based in Lviv, such as Kredobank, Idea Bank, VS Bank, Oksi Bank and Lviv Bank. None of these banks have bankrupted during the political and economic crisis of 2014–2016, which can be explained by the presence of foreign capital in most of them.

From 2015 to 2019, the city experienced a construction boom. In Q1 2019, according to statistical data, growth in the volume of new housing construction was recorded in Lviv (3.2 times, to 377,900 square meters).

Lviv is a major business centre between Warsaw and Kyiv. According to the Lviv Economic Development Strategy, the main branches of the city's economy by 2025 were to be tourism and information technologies (IT), with business services and logistics also considered priorities. In addition, the Nestlé service centre is in Lviv. This centre guides the company's divisions in 20 countries of Central and Eastern Europe. Also during 2016 the Global Service Center VimpelCom in Lviv was launched, which serves finance, procurement and HR operations in eight foreign branches of this company.

There are multiple restaurants and shops as well as street vendors of food, books, clothes, traditional cultural items and tourist gifts. Banking and money trading are an important part of the economy of Lviv with banks and exchange offices throughout the city. The city is also a home for big food-related companies like Lvivske beer factory, Svitoch chocolate factory, Enzym, Lviv Liquor and Vodka factory, an international restaurant franchise Lviv Croissants etc.

=== Information technology ===
Lviv is also one of the leaders of software export in Eastern Europe, with expected sector growth of 20% by 2020. Over 15% of all IT specialists in Ukraine work in Lviv, with over 4100 new IT graduates coming from local universities each year. About 2,500 tech enthusiasts attended Lviv IT Arena, the largest technology conference in Western Ukraine. Over 24,000 IT specialists work in Lviv as of 2019. Lviv is among top five most popular Ukrainian cities for opening R&D centre in IT and IT outsourcing spheres together with Kyiv, Dnipro, Kharkiv and Odesa.

In 2009, KPMG, one of the well-known international auditing companies, included Lviv as one of the top 30 cities with the greatest potential of information technology development. As of December 2015, there were 192 IT companies operating in the city, of which 4 were large (with more than 400 employees), 16 were average (150–300 employees), 97 were small (10–110 employees) and 70 were micro companies (3–7 employees). From 2017 to 2018 the number of IT companies increased to 317.

The turnover of Lviv's IT industry in 2015 amounted to $300 million. About 50% of IT services are exported to the US, 37% to Europe, and the rest to other countries. As of 2015, about 15 thousand specialists were employed in this industry with an average salary of 28 thousand UAH. According to a study of the Economic Effect of the Lviv IT-Market, which was conducted by Lviv IT Cluster and sociological agency "The Farm", there were 257 IT companies operating in Lviv in 2017 which employed about 17 thousand specialists. The economic impact of the IT industry in Lviv is $734 million.

There are 15 top universities in Lviv, 5 of which prepare highly skilled specialists in computer and IT technologies and supply over 1,000 IT graduates to the market annually.

Lviv-based IT outsourcing companies employ Ukrainian software developers in various roles, including front-end, JavaScript, back-end and full-stack development. These professionals have varying levels of qualifications, experience and English-language proficiency. Some IT companies in Lviv provide software development services to international corporations rather than developing their own software products.

=== Energy sector ===
Lviv and the surrounding region are located in the vicinity of Dashava gas field and Lviv-Volyn coal basin, which provide supplies to local industrial enterprises, including power plants.

== Culture ==
L'viv – the Ensemble of the Historic Centre
UNESCO World Heritage Site
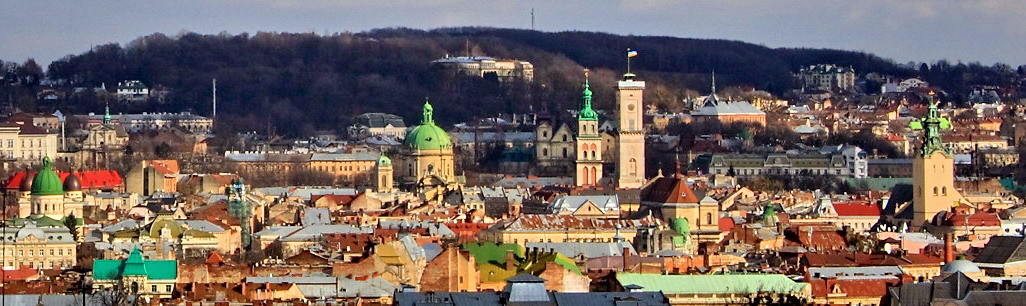
- Town view from High Castle
- Interactive map of L'viv – the Ensemble of the Historic Centre
- Criteria: Cultural: ii, v
- Reference: 865
- Inscription: 1998 (22nd Session)
- Area: 120 ha (300 acres)
- Buffer zone: 2,441 ha (6,030 acres)

Lviv is one of Ukraine's most important cultural centres. It is known as a centre of art, literature, music and theatre. Nowadays, the evidence of the city's cultural richness is the number of theatres, concert halls, and creative unions, and the high number of artistic activities (more than 100 festivals annually, 60 museums, and 10 theatres).

Lviv's historic centre has been on the United Nations Educational, Scientific and Cultural Organization (UNESCO) World Heritage list since 1998. UNESCO gave the following reasons for its selection:

Criterion II: In its urban fabric and its architecture, Lviv is an outstanding example of the fusion of the architectural and artistic traditions of central and eastern Europe with those of Italy and Germany.

Criterion V: The political and commercial role of Lviv attracted to it a number of ethnic groups with different cultural and religious traditions, who established separate yet interdependent communities within the city, evidence for which is still discernible in the modern town's landscape.

The World Heritage Site consists of Seredmistia (Middletown), Pidzamche, High Castle, and the ensemble of St. George's Cathedral.

=== Architecture ===
Lviv's historic churches, buildings and relics date from the 13th century to the early 20th century (Polish and Austro-Hungarian rule). In recent centuries Lviv was spared some of the invasions and wars that destroyed other Ukrainian cities. Its architecture reflects various European styles and periods. After the fires of 1527 and 1556 Lviv lost most of its gothic-style buildings but it retains many buildings in renaissance, baroque and the classic styles. There are works by artists of the Vienna Secession, Art Nouveau and Art Deco.

The buildings have multiple stone sculptures and carvings, particularly on large doors, which are hundreds of years old. The remains of old churches dot the central cityscape. Some three- to five-storey buildings have hidden inner courtyards and grottoes in various states of repair. Some cemeteries are of interest: for example, the Lychakivskiy Cemetery where the Polish elite was buried for centuries. Leaving the central area the architectural style changes radically as Soviet-era high-rise blocks dominate. In the centre of the city, the Soviet era is reflected mainly in a few modern-style national monuments and sculptures.

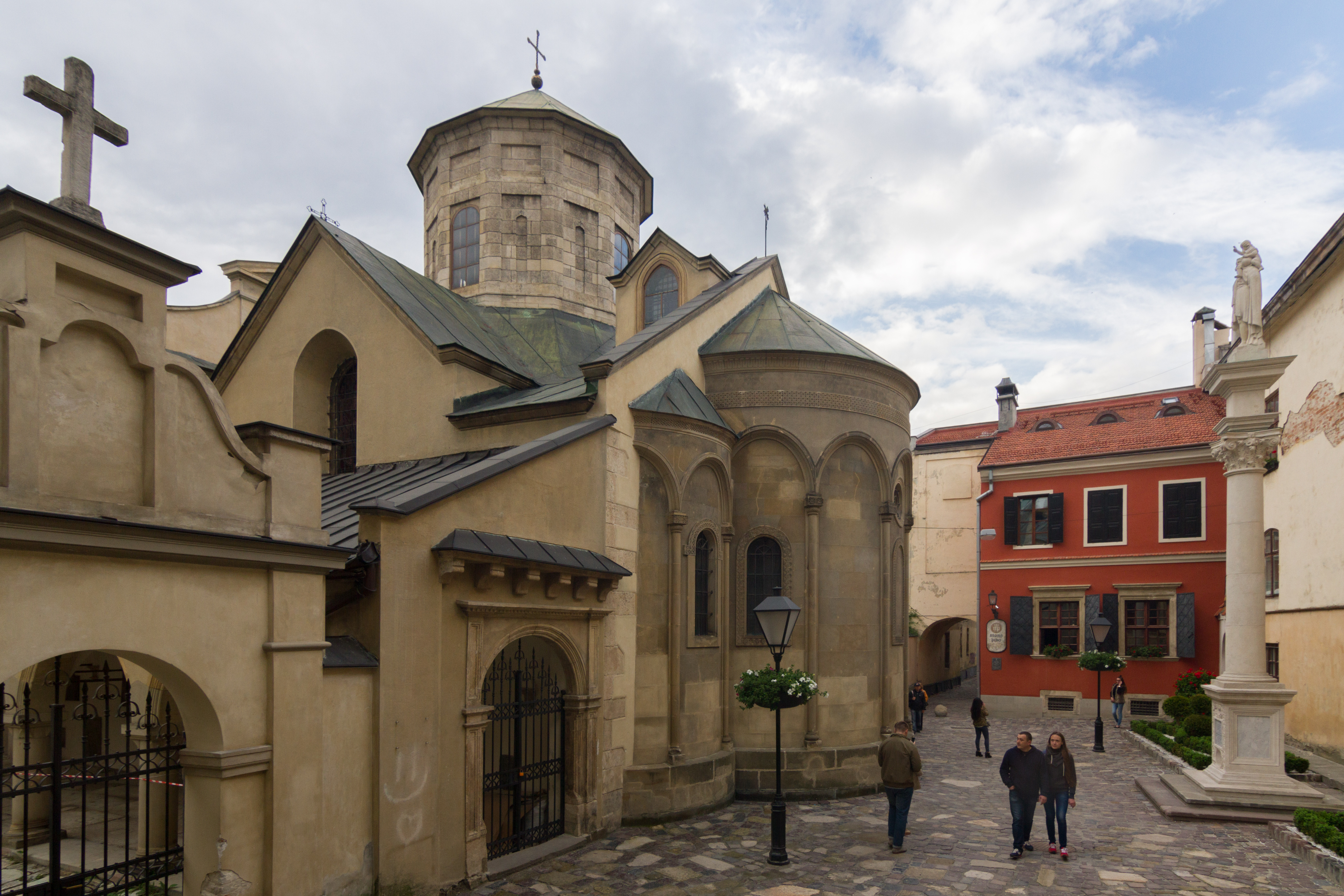
Armenian Cathedral of Lviv

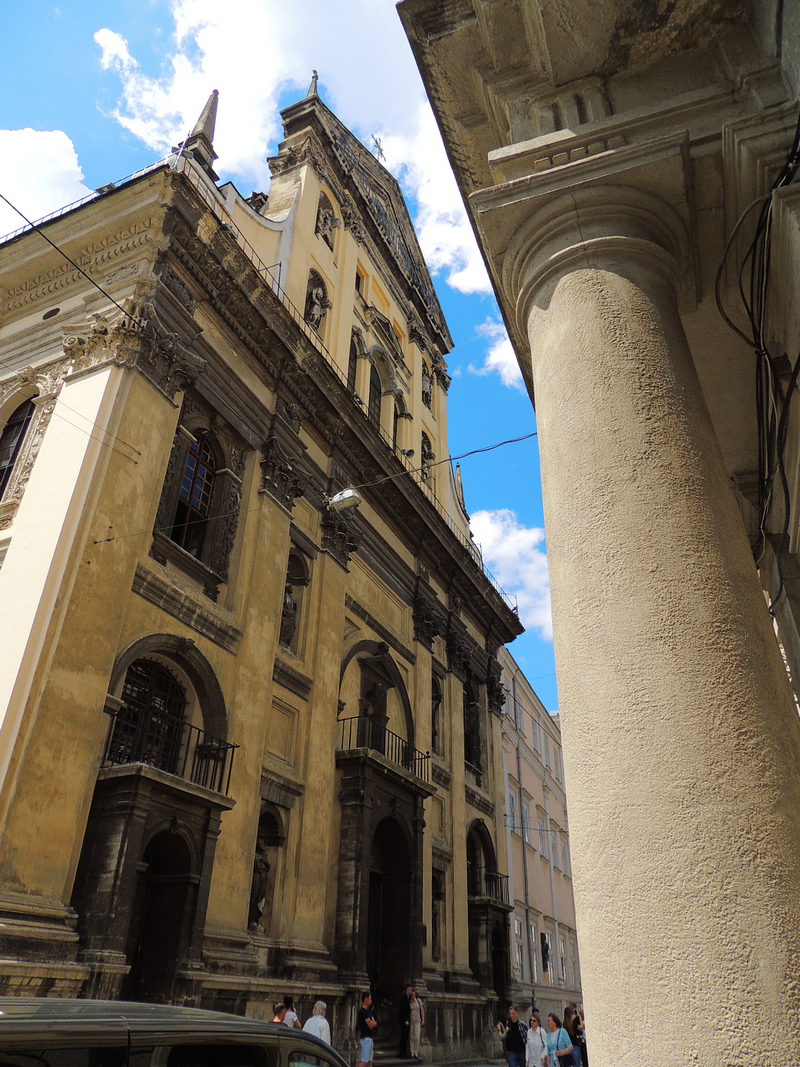
Baroque Saints Peter and Paul Garrison Church

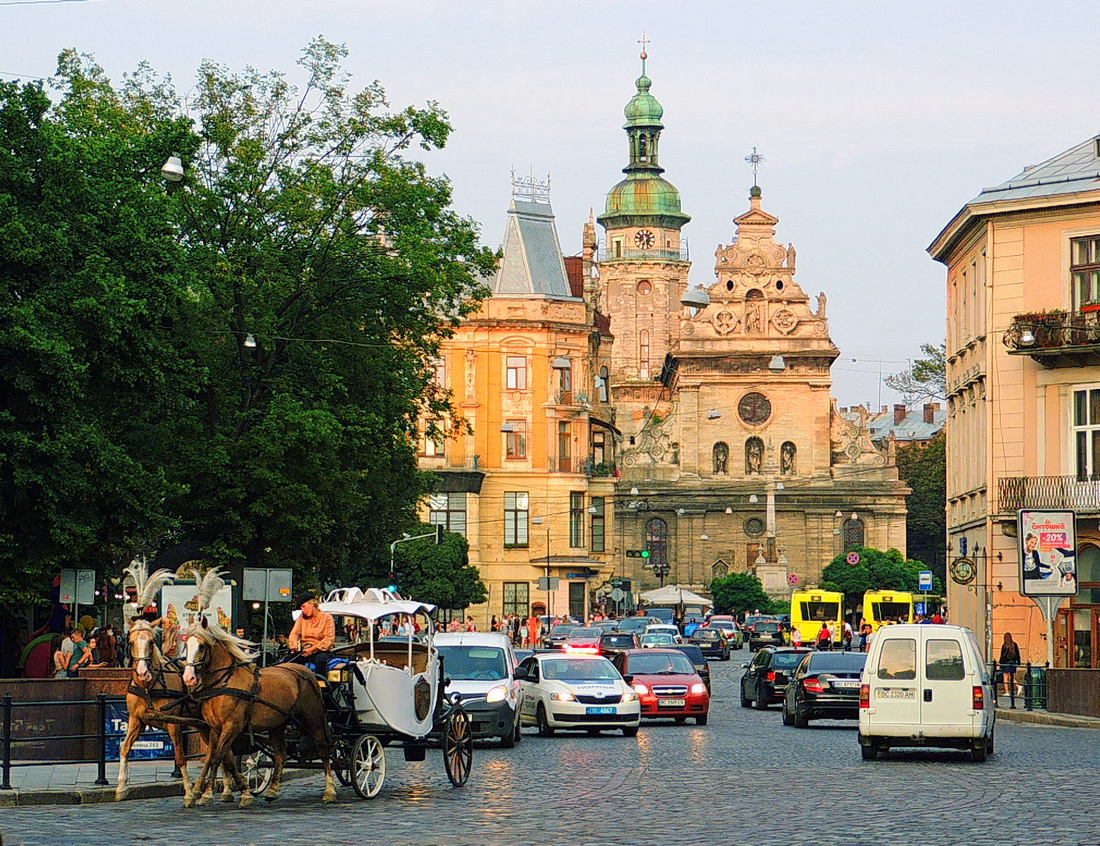
Bernardine church and monastery in the style of Italian mannerism

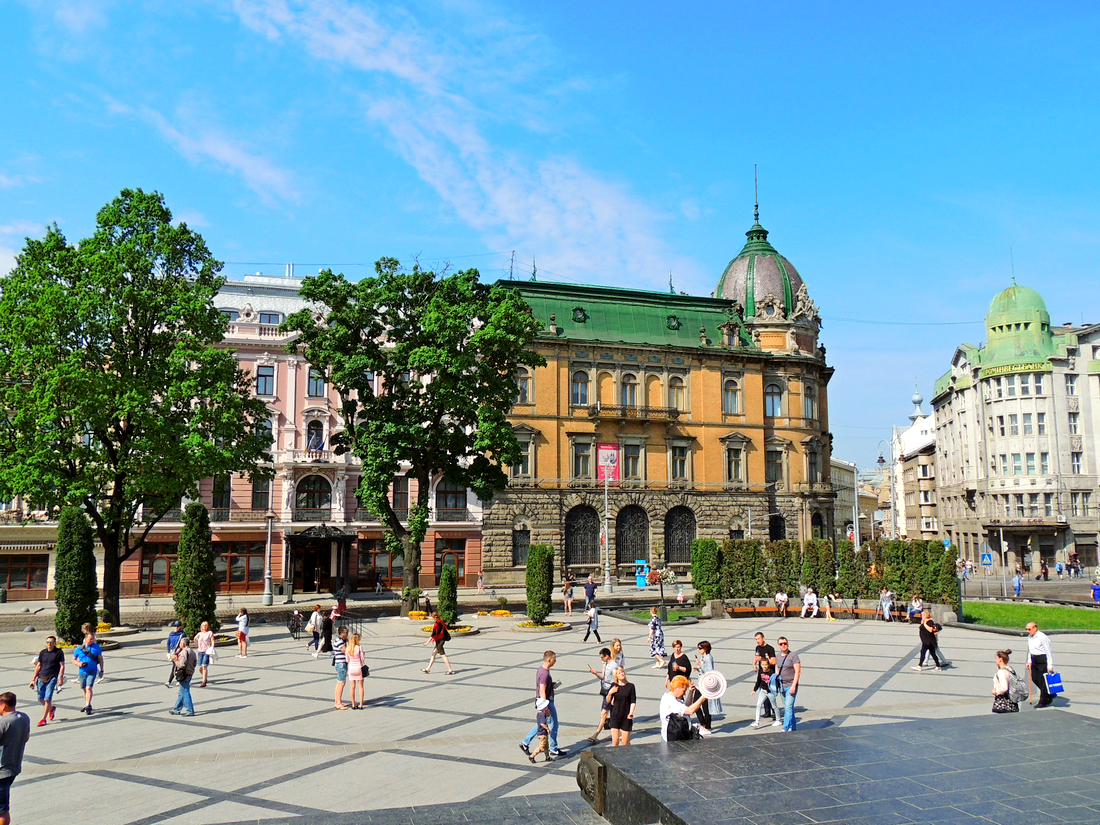
Early 20th century architecture in Lviv

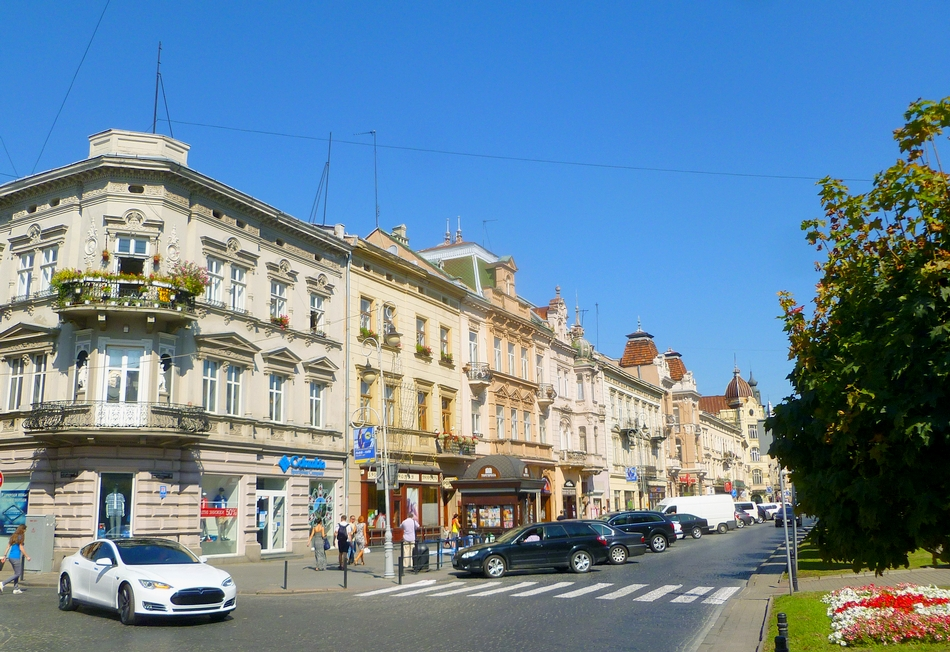
Architecture of Shevchenko Avenue

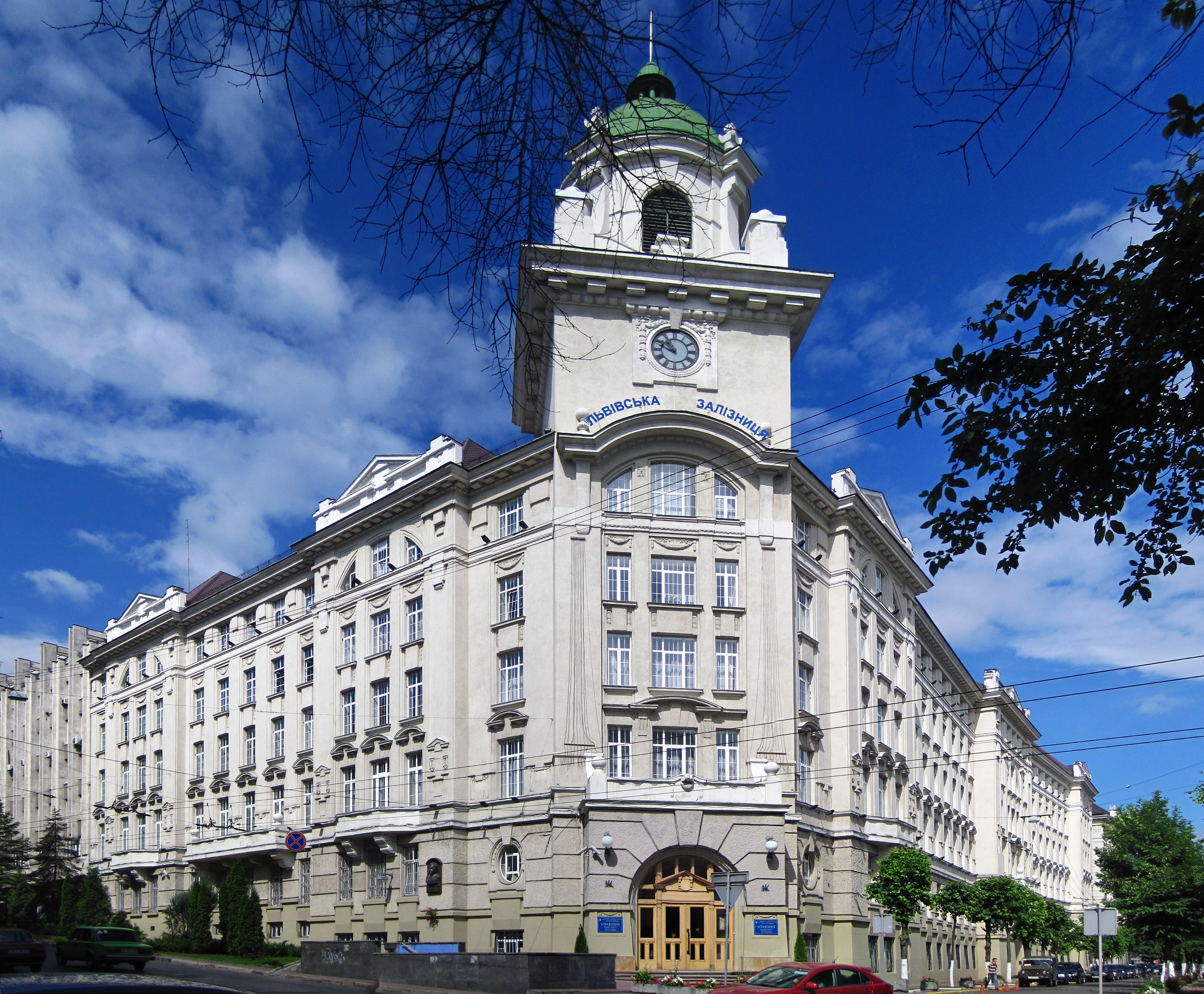
Lviv Railways headquarters

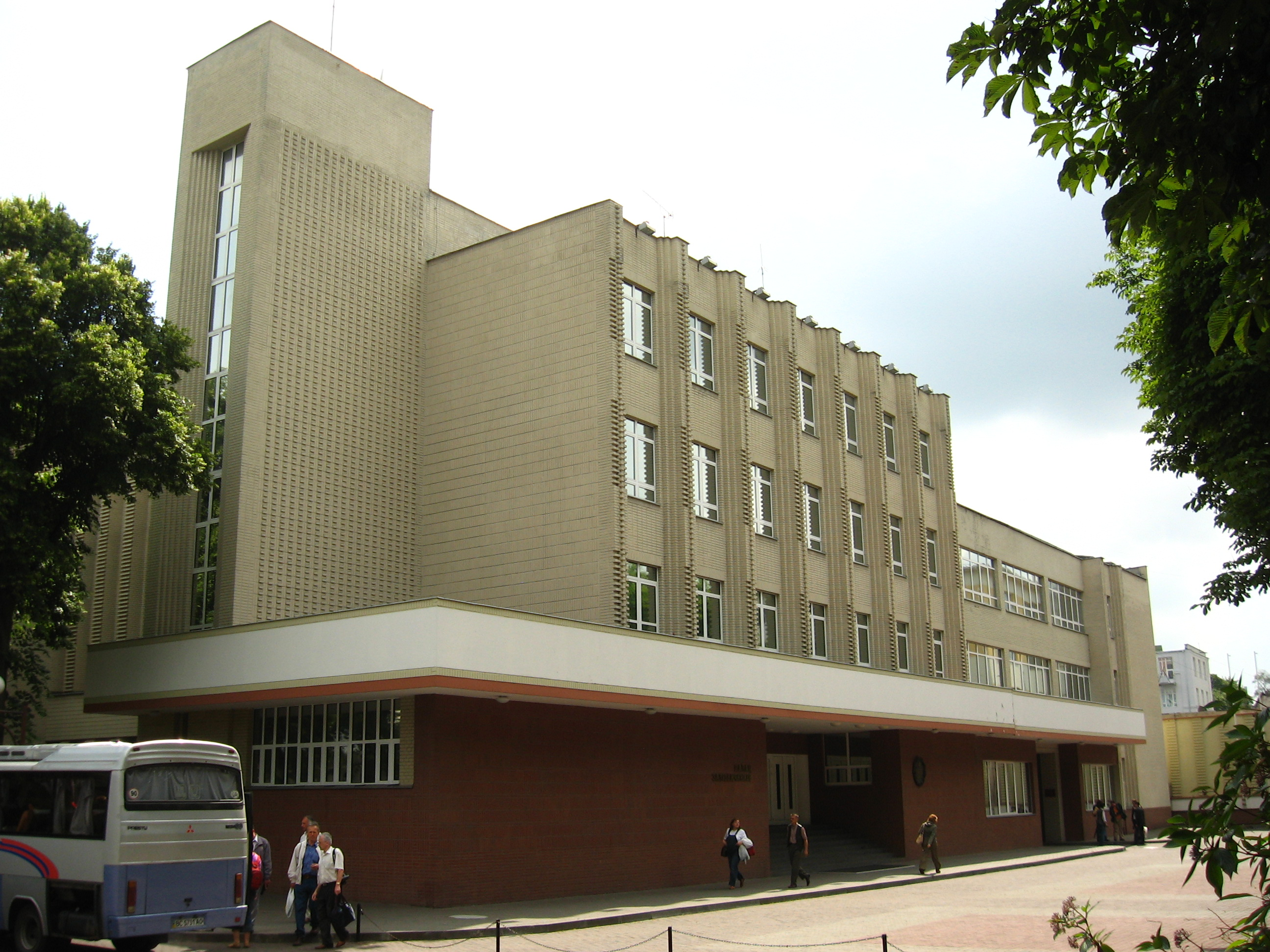
Railwaymen's Palace of Culture, an example of functionalist architecture

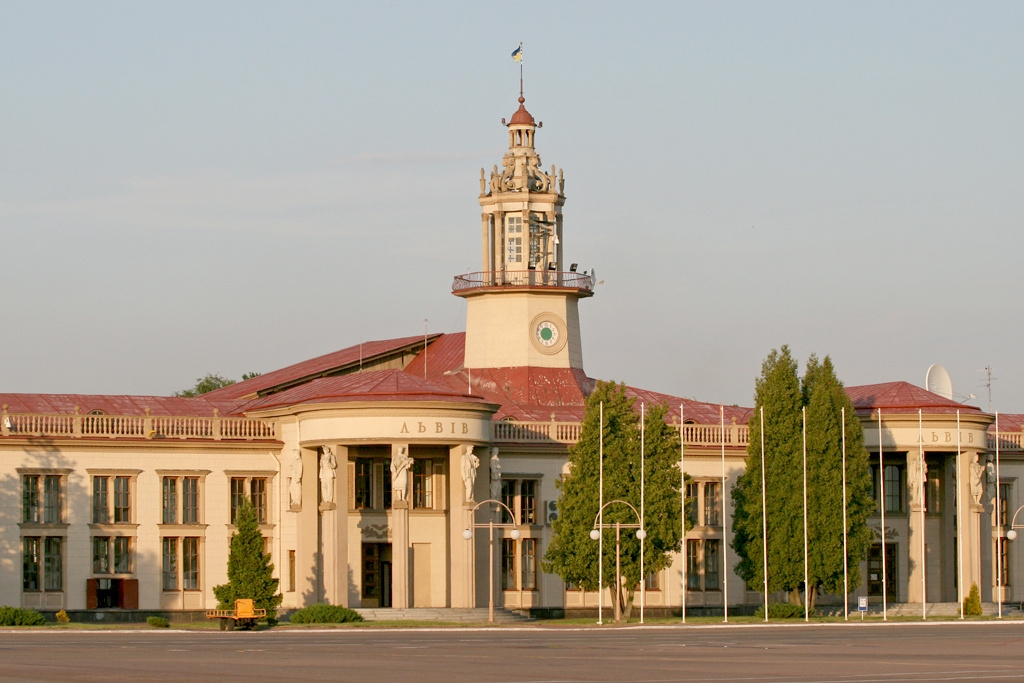
Old terminal of Lviv Airport built in Stalinist style

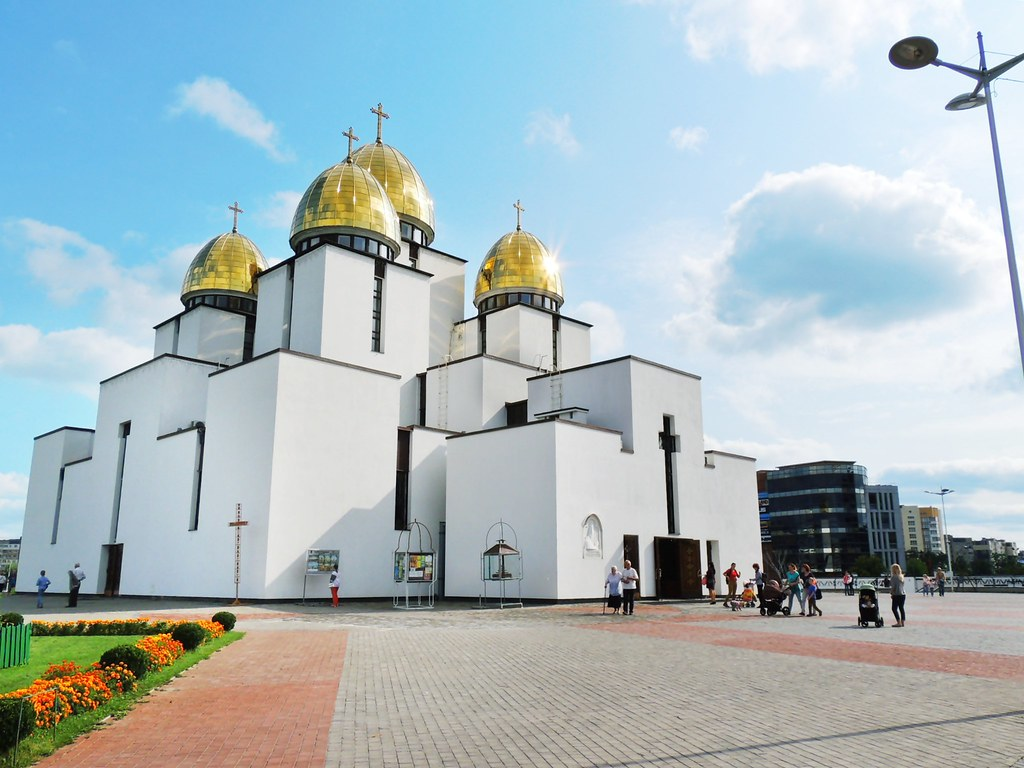
The Nativity of the Holy Virgin Church was constructed in 1995–2001 in Sykhiv district

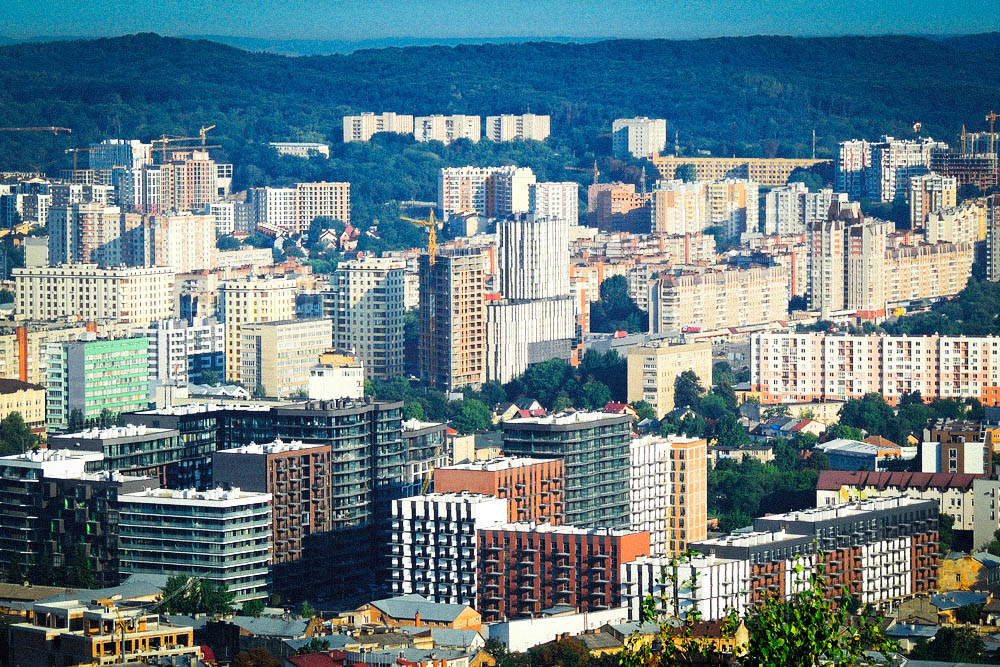
The mixture of modern and Soviet-era architecture in the northern part of the city

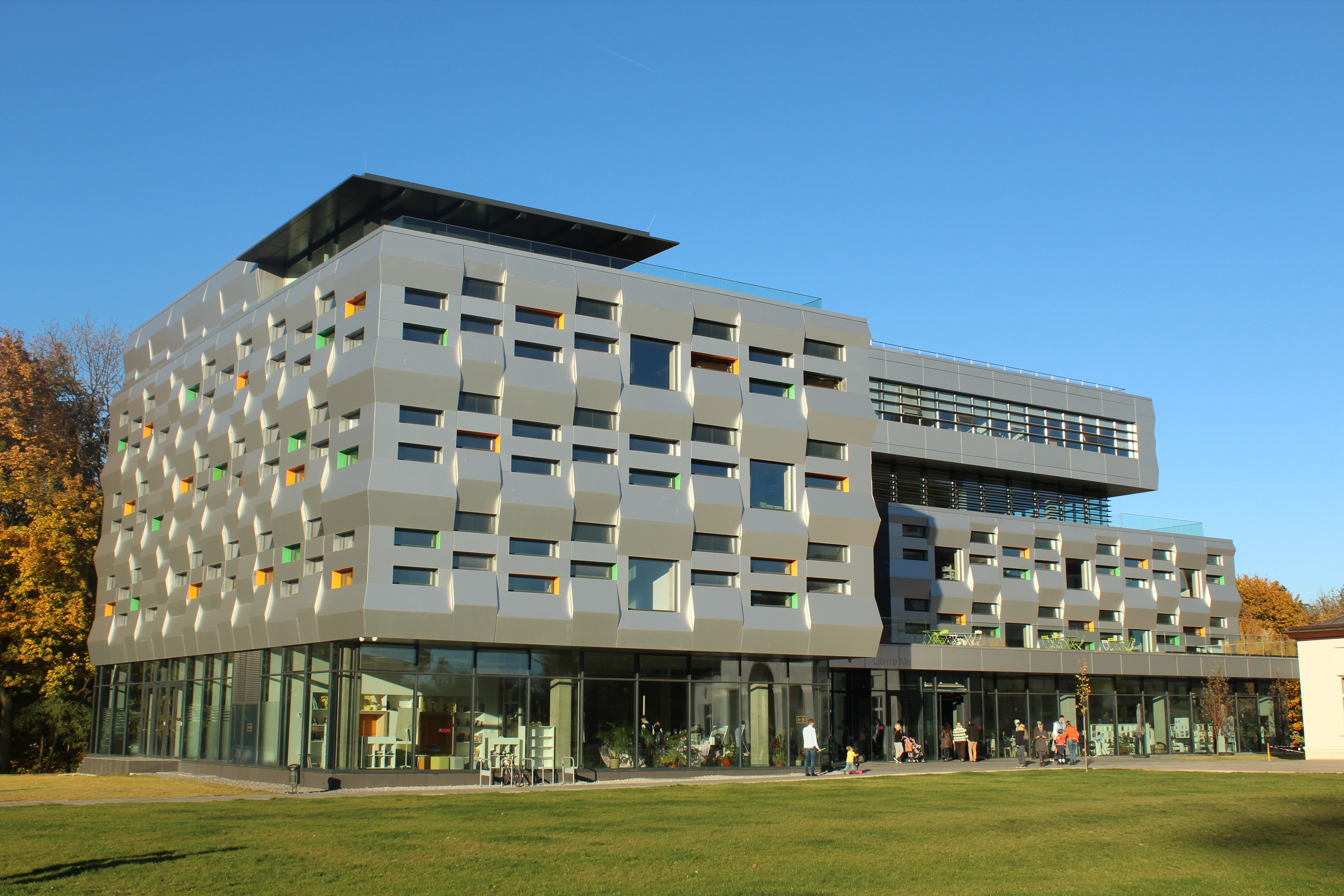
Andrey Sheptytsky Centre of the Ukrainian Catholic University

Many buildings in the old part of the city are examples of Polish architecture, which flourished in Lviv after the opening of the Technical School (later Polytechnic), the first higher-education technical academy in Polish lands. Polytechnic educated generations of architects who were influential in the entire country. Examples include the main buildings of Lviv Polytechnic, the University of Lviv, the Lviv Opera, the Lviv railway station, the former building of Galicyjska Kasa Oszczędności, and Potocki Palace.

=== Monuments ===
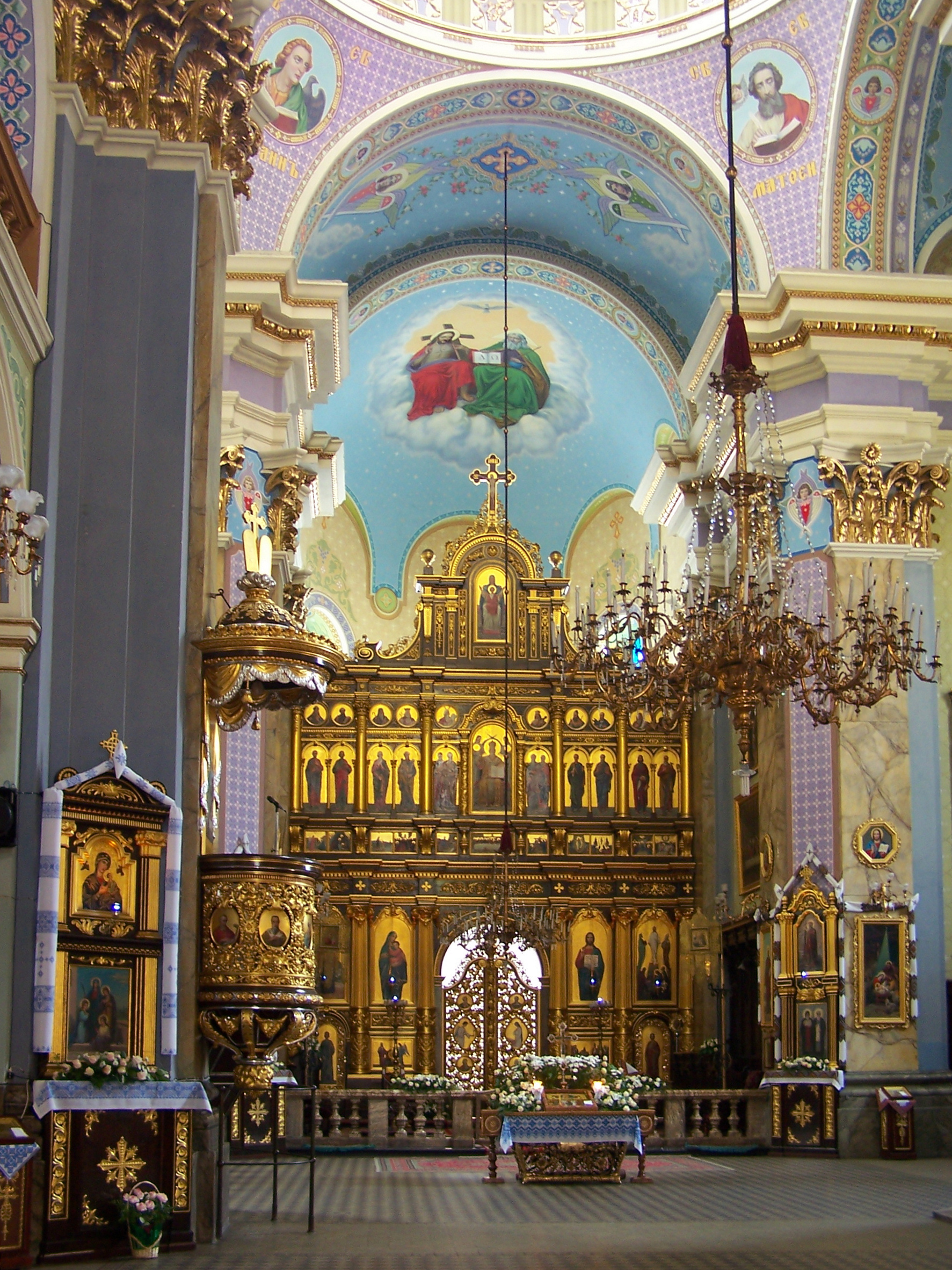
Inside the Church of the Transfiguration

The Church of the Assumption

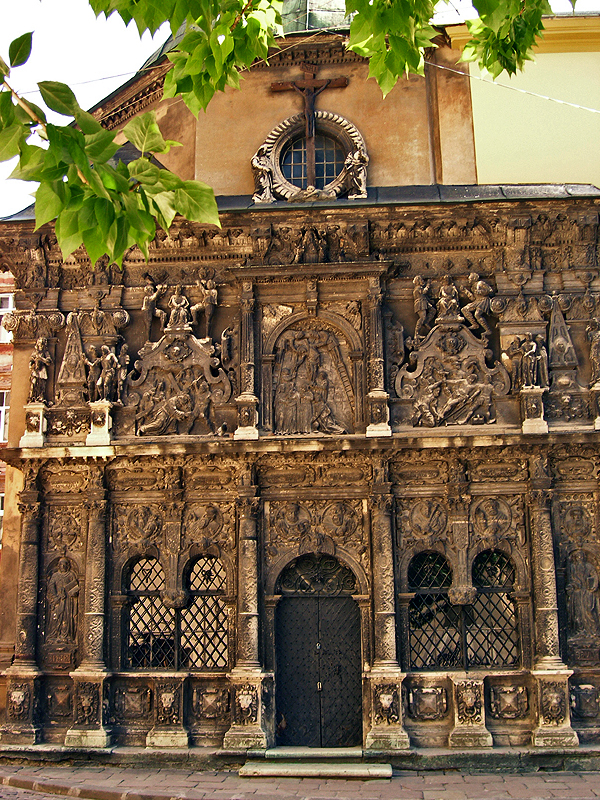
Chapel of the Boim family

Outdoor sculptures in the city commemorate a number of notable individuals and topics reflecting the rich and complex history of Lviv. There are monuments to Adam Mickiewicz, Ivan Franko, King Danylo, Taras Shevchenko, Ivan Fedorov, Solomiya Krushelnytska, Ivan Pidkova, Mykhailo Hrushevskyi, Pope John Paul II, Jan Kiliński, Ivan Trush, Saint George, Bartosz Głowacki, the monument to the Virgin Mary, to Nikifor, The Good Soldier Švejk, Stepan Bandera, Leopold von Sacher-Masoch, and others.

During the interwar period there were monuments commemorating important figures of Polish history. Some of them were moved to the Polish "Recovered Territories" after World War II, like the Monument to Aleksander Fredro, which now is in Wrocław, the Monument of King John III Sobieski, which after 1945 was moved to Gdańsk, and the monument of Kornel Ujejski, which is now in Szczecin. A book market takes place around the monument to Ivan Fеdorovych, a typographer in the 16th century who fled Moscow and found a new home in Lviv.

New ideas came to Lviv during Austro–Hungarian rule. In the 19th century, multiple publishing houses, newspapers and magazines were established. Among these was the Ossolineum which was one of the most important Polish scientific libraries. Most Polish-language books and publications of the Ossolineum library are still kept in a local Jesuit church. In 1997 the Polish government asked the Ukrainian government to return these documents to Poland. In 2003, Ukraine allowed access to these publications for the first time. In 2006, an office of the Ossolineum (now in Wrocław) opened in Lviv and began scanning all its documents. Works written in Lviv contributed to Austrian, Ukrainian, Yiddish, and Polish literature, with a multitude of translations.

The Stepan Bandera monument in Lviv, which stands in front of the Stele of Ukraine Monument, is a statue dedicated to nationalist leader, Stepan Bandera, a controversial twentieth century Ukrainian symbol of nationalism.

=== Religion ===
Lviv is a city of religious variety. Religion (2012): Catholic: 57% (Ukrainian Greek Catholic Church 56% and Roman Catholic Church 1%), Orthodox: 32%, Protestantism: 2%, Judaism: 0.1%, Other religion: 3%, Indifferent to religious matters: 4%, Atheism: 1.9%.

==== Christianity ====
At one point, over 60 churches existed in the city. Christian groups have existed in the city since the 13th century. The city has been the episcopal see of three different particular churches of Catholic Church: The Ukrainian Catholic Archeparchy of Lviv of the Ukrainian Greek Catholic Church, the Archdiocese of Lviv of the Latin Church, and formerly the Armenian Catholic Archeparchy of Lviv of the Armenian Catholic Church. Each has had a diocesan seat in Lviv since the 16th century. At the end of the 16th century, the Eastern Orthodox community in Ukraine transferred their allegiance to the Pope in Rome and became the Ukrainian Greek Catholic Church. This bond was forcibly dissolved in 1946 by the Soviet authorities and the Roman Catholic community was forced out by the expulsion of the Polish population. Since 1989, religious life in Lviv has experienced a revival. About 35 percent of religious buildings belong to the Ukrainian Greek Catholic Church, 11.5 percent to the Ukrainian Autocephalous Orthodox Church, 9 per cent to the Ukrainian Orthodox Church – Kyiv Patriarchate and 6 per cent to the Roman Catholic Church.

In June 2001, Pope John Paul II visited the Latin Cathedral, St. George's Cathedral and the Armenian Cathedral.

==== Judaism ====
Lviv historically had a large and active Jewish community and until 1941, at least 45 synagogues and prayer houses existed. Even in the 16th century, two separate communities existed. One lived in today's old town with the other in the Krakowskie Przedmieście. The Golden Rose Synagogue was built in Lviv in 1582. In the 19th century, a more differentiated community started to spread out. Liberal Jews sought more cultural assimilation and spoke German and Polish. On the other hand, Orthodox and Hasidic Jews tried to retain the old traditions. Between 1941 and 1944, the Germans in effect completely destroyed the centuries-old Jewish tradition of Lviv. Most synagogues were destroyed and the Jewish population was forced first into a ghetto before being forcibly transported to concentration camps where they were murdered.

Under the Soviet Union, synagogues remained closed and were used as warehouses or cinemas. The last functioning synagogue was closed in the 1960s. Only since the fall of the Iron Curtain, has the remainder of the Jewish community experienced a faint revival.

Currently, the only functioning Orthodox Jewish synagogue in Lviv is the Beis Aharon V'Yisrael Synagogue.

=== Arts ===
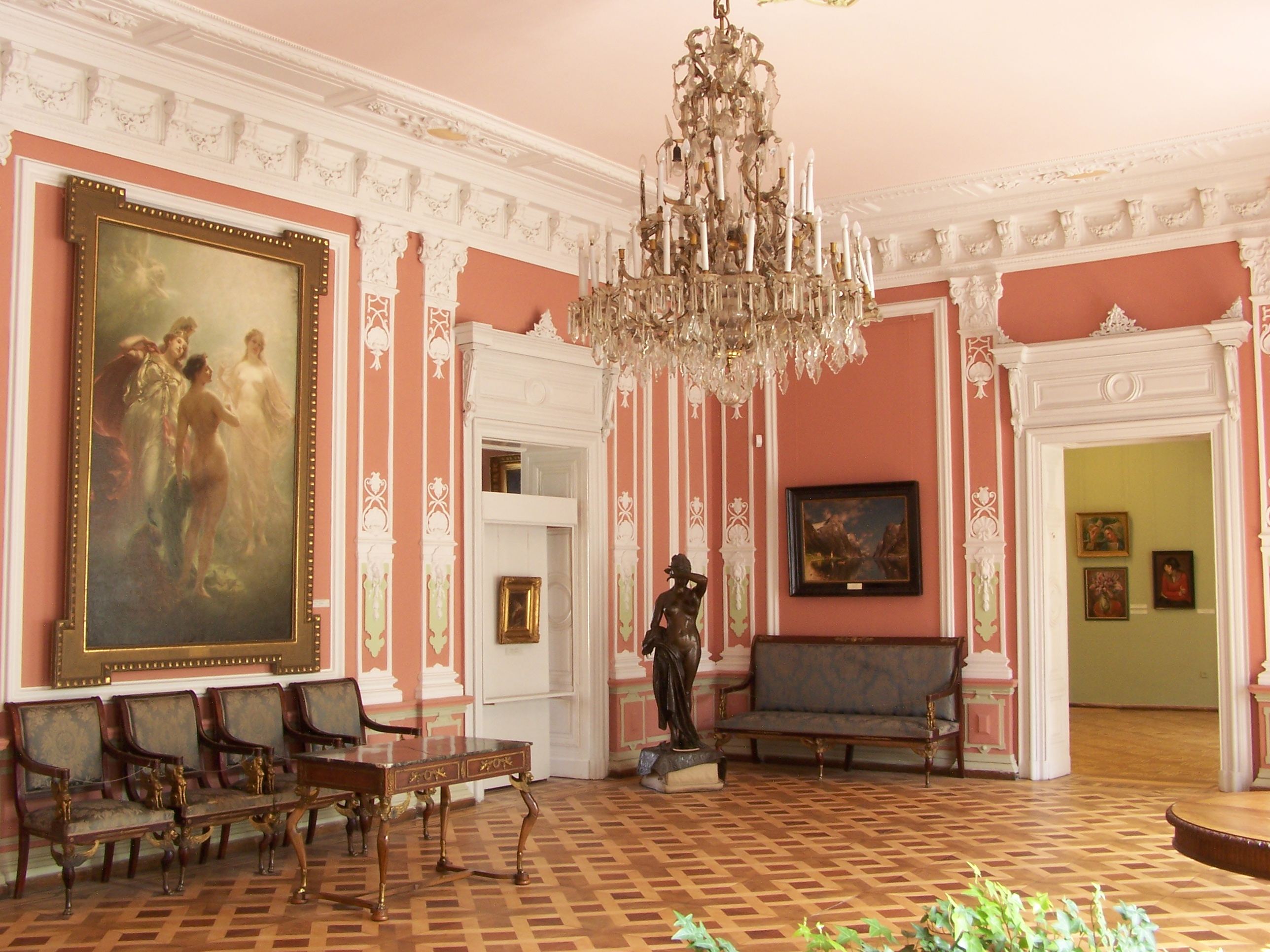
A room in the Lviv National Art Gallery

The artistic range of Lviv includes classical art. The Lviv Opera and Lviv Philharmonic host classical art performances. Sculptor Johann Georg Pinsel created works that are visible on the façade of St. George's Cathedral and in the Pinsel Museum. Singer Solomiya Krushelnytska began her career at the Lviv Opera and later sang at La Scala Opera in Milan.

The "Group Artes" was a young movement founded in 1929. A number of the artists studied in Paris and travelled throughout Europe. They worked and experimented in different areas of modern art: Futurism, Cubism, New Objectivity and Surrealism. Co–operation took place between avant-garde musicians and authors. Altogether thirteen exhibitions by "Artes" took place in Warsaw, Kraków, Łódz and Lviv. The German occupation put an end to this group. Otto Hahn was executed in 1942 in Lviv and Aleksander Riemer was murdered in Auschwitz in 1943.

Henryk Streng and Margit Reich-Sielska were able to escape the Holocaust (or Shoah). Most of the surviving members of Artes lived in Poland after 1945. Only Margit Reich-Sielska (1900–1980) and Roman Sielski (1903–1990) stayed in Soviet Lviv. For years the city was one of the most important cultural centres of Poland with such writers as Aleksander Fredro, Gabriela Zapolska, Leopold Staff, Maria Konopnicka and Jan Kasprowicz living in Lviv.

Today Lviv is a city of fresh ideas and unusual characters. There are about 20 galleries (Lviv Municipal Art Center, The "Dzyga" Gallery, Art-Gallery "Primus", Gallery of the History of Ukrainian Military Uniforms, Gallery of Modern Art "Zelena Kanapa" and others). Lviv National Art Gallery is the largest museum of arts in Ukraine, with approximately 50,000 artworks, including paintings, sculptures and works of graphic art from Western and Eastern Europe, from the Middle Ages to the modern days.

=== Theatre and opera ===
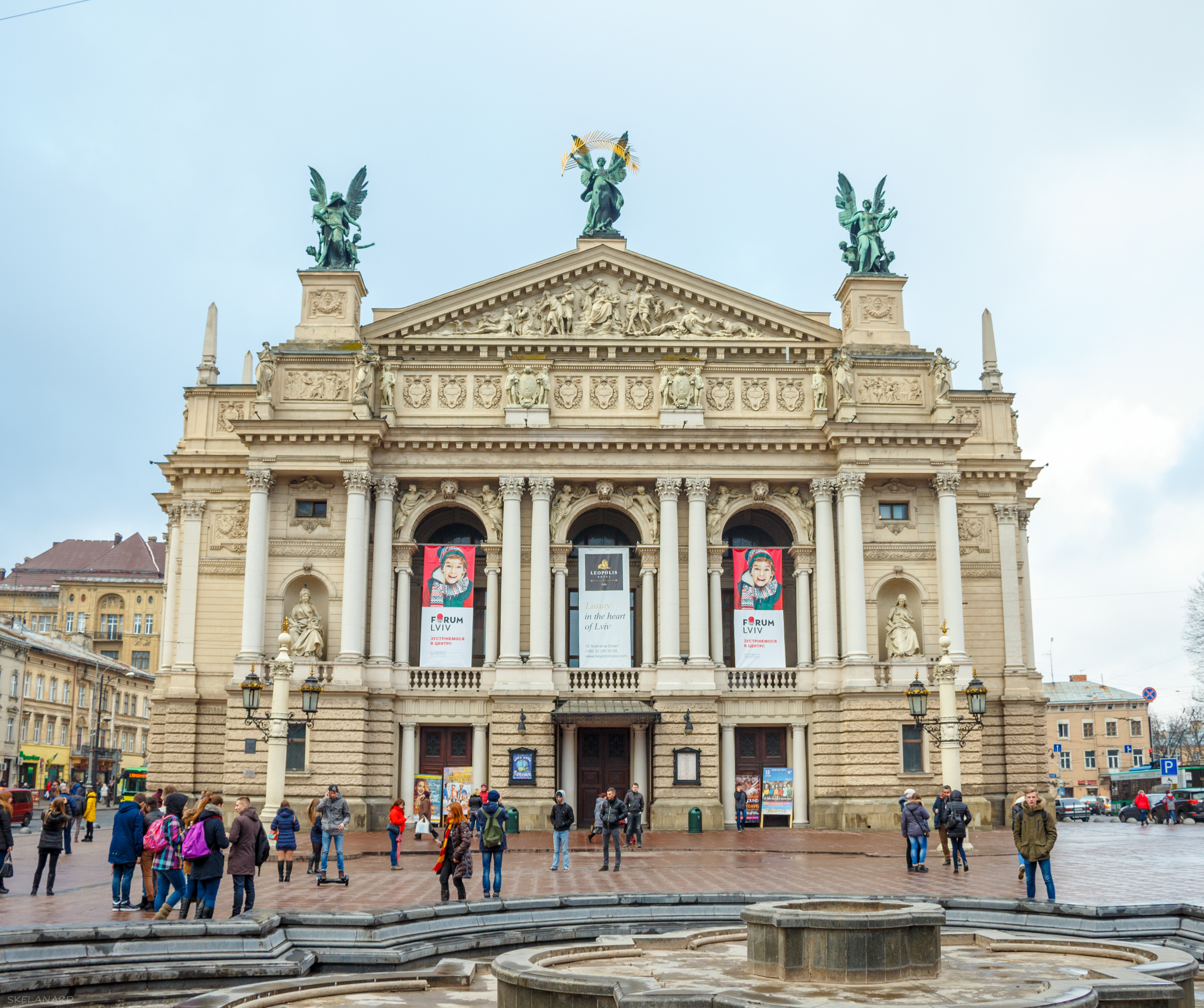
The Lviv Opera and Ballet Theatre, an important cultural centre for residents and visitors

In 1842 the Skarbek Theatre was opened making it the third-largest theatre in Central Europe. In 1903 the Lviv National Opera house, which at that time was called the City-Theatre, was opened emulating the Vienna State Opera house. The house initially offered a changing repertoire such as classical dramas in German and Polish language, opera, operetta, comedy and theatre. The opera house is named after the Ukrainian opera diva Salomea Krushelnytska who worked here.

In the Janowska concentration camp, the Nazis conducted torture and executions to music. To do so they brought almost the whole Lviv National Opera to the camp. Professor Shtriks, opera conductor Mund and other famous Jewish musicians were among the members. From 1941 to 1944 the Nazis massacred 200,000 people including all 40 musicians.

Nowadays Lviv Theatre of Opera and Ballet has a creative group of performers who strive to maintain traditions of Ukrainian opera and classical ballet. The Theatre is a well-organized creative body where over 500 people work towards a common goal. The repertoire includes 10 Ukrainian music compositions. No other similar theatre in Ukraine has such a large number of Ukrainian productions. There are also multiple operas written by foreign composers, and most of these operas are performed in the original language: Othello, Aida, La Traviata, Nabucco, and A Masked Ball by G. Verdi, Tosca, La Bohème and Madame Butterfly by G. Puccini, Cavalleria Rusticana by P. Mascagni, and Pagliacci by R. Leoncavallo (in Italian); Carmen by G. Bizet (in French), The Haunted Manor by S. Moniuszko (in Polish)

=== Museums and art galleries ===
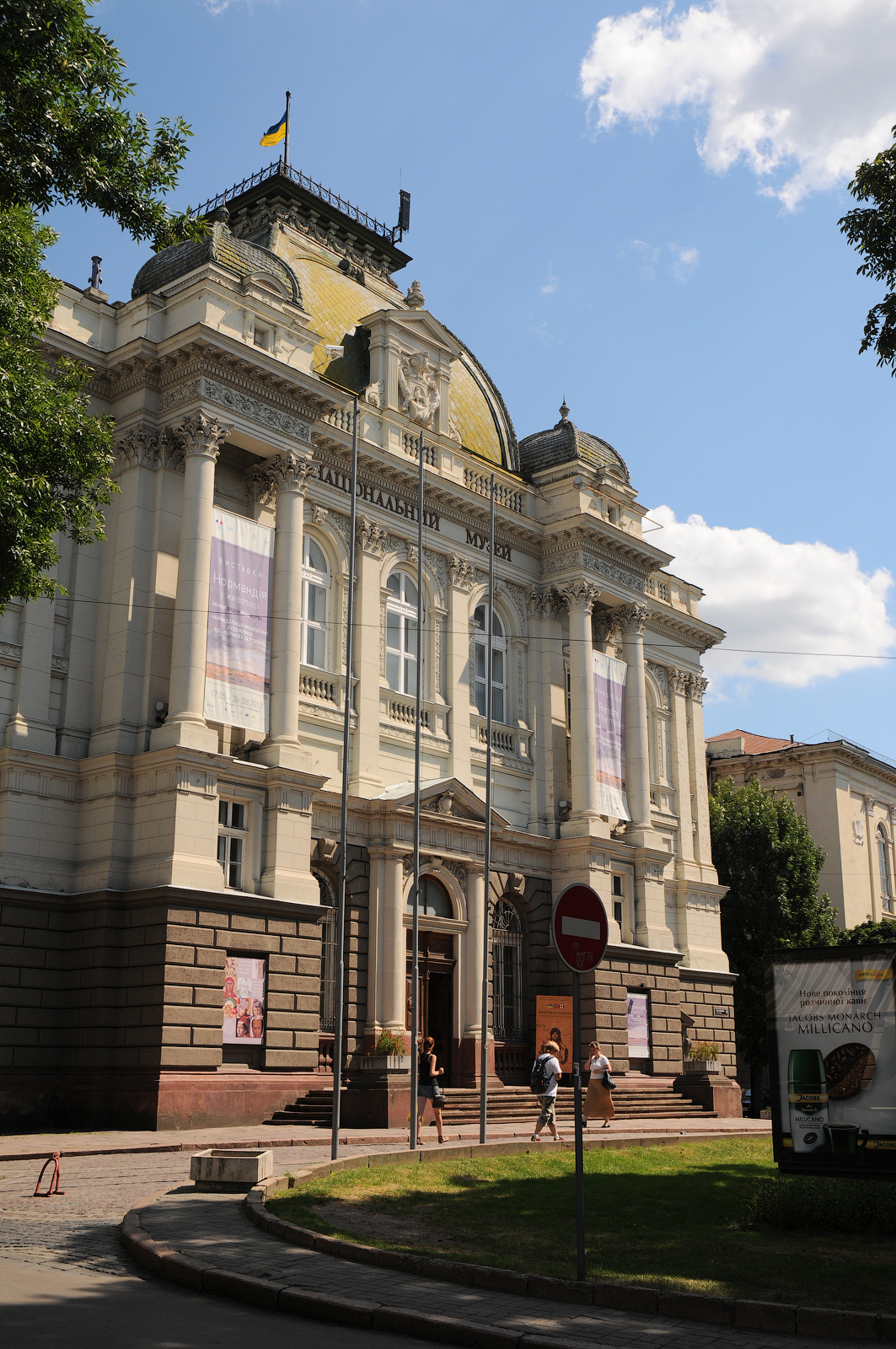
The main building of Lviv National Museum

Museum Pharmacy "Pid Chornym Orlom" (Beneath the Black Eagle) was founded in 1735 – it is the oldest pharmacy in Lviv. A museum related to pharmaceutical history was opened on the premises of the old pharmacy in 1966. The idea of creating such a museum had already come up in the 19th century. The Galician Association of Pharmacists was created in 1868. Members managed to assemble a small collection of exhibits, thus making the first step towards creating a new museum. The exhibition space has expanded considerably, with 16 exhibit rooms and a general exhibition surface totalling 700 sq. m. There are more than 3,000 exhibits in the museum. This is the only operating Museum Pharmacy in Ukraine and Europe.

The most notable of the museums are Lviv National Museum which houses the National Gallery. Its collection includes more than 140,000 unique items. The museum takes special pride in presenting the largest and most complete collection of medieval sacral art of the 12th to 18th centuries: icons, manuscripts, rare ancient books, decoratively carved pieces of art, metal and plastic artworks, and fabrics embroidered with gold and silver. The museum also boasts a unique monument of Ukrainian Baroque style: the Bohorodchansky Iconostasis. Exhibits include Ancient Ukrainian art from the 12th to 15th centuries, Ukrainian art from the 16th to 18th centuries, and Ukrainian art from the end of the 18th to the beginning of the 20th century.

The Museum of Ethnography and Crafts includes the Judaica collection of Maksymilian Goldstein.

The Museum of Salo opened in 2011.

Many Polish pieces of art and sculpture can be found in Lviv galleries, among them works by Jan Piotr Norblin, Marcello Bacciarelli, Kazimierz Wojniakowski, Antoni Brodowski, Henryk Rodakowski, Artur Grottger, Jan Matejko, Aleksander Gierymski, Jan Stanisławski, Leon Wyczółkowski, Józef Chełmoński, Józef Mehoffer, Stanisław Wyspiański, Olga Boznańska, Władysław Słowiński, Jacek Malczewski.

=== Music ===
Lviv has an active musical and cultural life. Apart from the Lviv Opera, it has symphony orchestras, chamber orchestras and the Trembita Chorus. Lviv has one of the most prominent music academies and music colleges in Ukraine, the Lviv Conservatory, and a factory for stringed musical instruments. Lviv has been the home of a number of composers, such as Mozart's son Franz Xaver Wolfgang Mozart, Stanislav Liudkevych, Wojciech Kilar and Mykola Kolessa.

Flute virtuoso and composer Albert Franz Doppler (1821–1883) was born and spent his formative years here, including flute lessons from his father. The classical pianist Mieczysław Horszowski (1892–1993) was born here. The opera diva Salomea Kruszelnicka called Lviv her home from the 1920s to 1930s. The classical violinist Adam Han Gorski was born here in 1940. "Polish Radio Lwów" was a Polish radio station that went on air on 15 January 1930. The programme proved popular in Poland. Classical music and entertainment was aired as well as lectures, readings, youth programmes, news and liturgical services on Sunday.

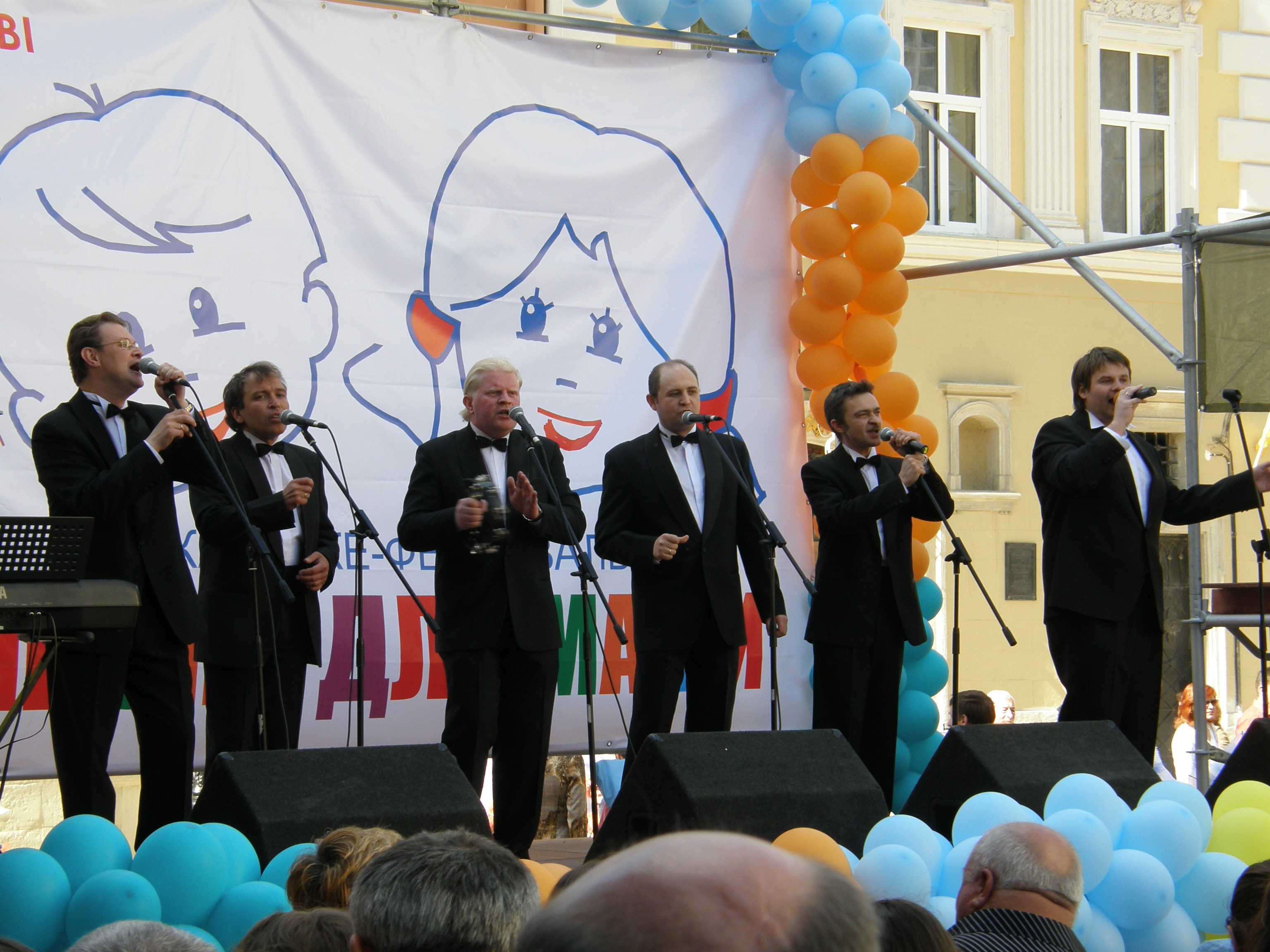
Pikkardiyska Tertsiya – Ukrainian a cappella musical formation

Popular throughout Poland was the Comic Lwów Wave a cabaret-revue with musical pieces. Jewish artists contributed a great part to this artistic activity. Composers such as Henryk Wars, songwriters Emanuel Szlechter and Wiktor Budzyński, the actor Mieczysław Monderer and Adolf Fleischer ("Aprikosenkranz und Untenbaum") worked in Lviv. The most notable stars of the shows were Henryk Vogelfänger and Kazimierz Wajda who appeared together as the comic duo "Szczepko and Tońko" and were similar to Laurel and Hardy.

The Lviv Philharmonic is a major cultural centre with a long history and traditions that complement Ukraine's entire culture. From the stage of Lviv Philharmonic began their way to the great art world-famous Ukrainian musicians Oleh Krysa, Oleksandr Slobodyanik, Yuriy Lysychenko, and Maria Chaikovska, as well as the younger musicians E. Chupryk, Y. Ermin, Oksana Rapita, and Olexandr Kozarenko. Lviv Philharmonic is one of Ukraine's leading concert institutions. Its activities include international festivals, cycles of concerts-monographs, and concerts with young musicians.

The Chamber Orchestra "Lviv virtuosos" was organised by the best Lviv musicians in 1994. The orchestra consists of 16–40 persons / it depends on programmes/ and in the repertoire are included the musical compositions from Bach, Corelli to modern Ukrainian and European composers. During the short time of its operation, the orchestra acquired the professional level of the best European standards. It is mentioned in more than 100 positive articles by Ukrainian and foreign musical critics.

Lviv is the hometown of the Vocal formation "Pikkardiyska Tertsiya" and Eurovision Song Contest 2004 winner Ruslana who has since become well known in Europe and the rest of the world. PikkardiyskaTertsia was created on 24 September 1992 in Lviv and has won multiple musical awards. It all began with a quartet performing ancient Ukrainian music from the 15th century, along with adaptations of traditional Ukrainian folk songs.

The Lviv Organ Hall hosts classical music performances, including organ, symphonic, and chamber music. The venue receives approximately 50,000 visitors annually and features performances by international musicians. Lviv is also the hometown of the Ukrainian rock band Okean Elzy

=== Universities and academia ===
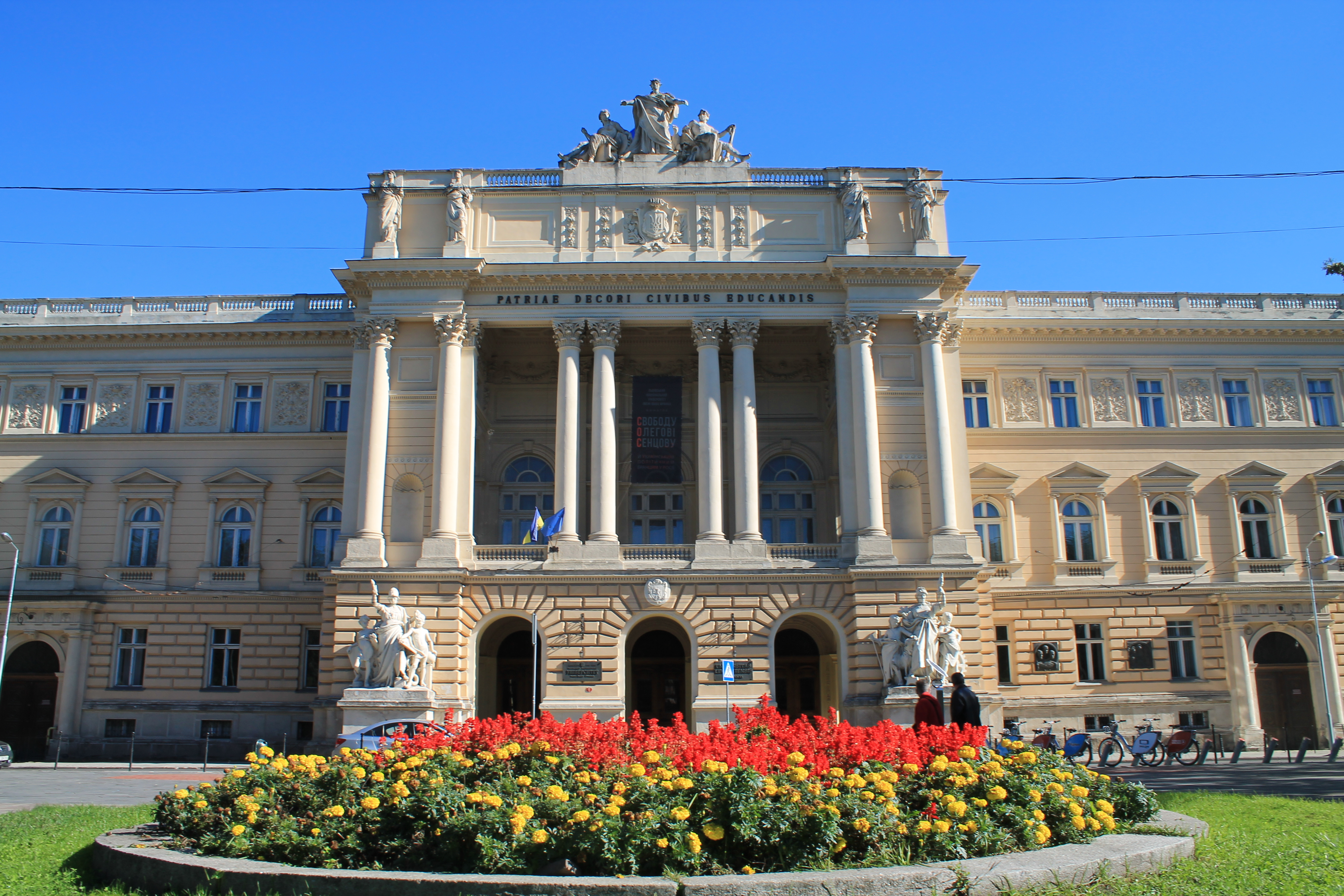
The front façade of the Lviv University, the oldest university in Ukraine

Lviv University is one of the oldest in Central Europe and was founded as a Society of Jesus (Jesuit) school in 1608. Its prestige greatly increased through the work of philosopher Kazimierz Twardowski (1866–1938) who was one of the founders of the Lwów-Warsaw School of Logic. This school of thought set benchmarks for academic research and education in Poland. The Polish politician of the interbellum period Stanisław Głąbiński had served as dean of the law department (1889–1890) and as the university rector (1908–1909). In 1901 the city was the seat of the Lwów Scientific Society among whose members were major scientific figures. The most well-known were the mathematicians Stefan Banach, Juliusz Schauder and Stanisław Ulam who were founders of the Lwów School of Mathematics turning Lviv in the 1930s into the "World Centre of Functional Analysis" and whose share in Lviv academia was substantial.

In 1852 in Dublany, (eight km (5.0 mi) from the outskirts of Lviv) the Agricultural Academy was opened and was one of the first Polish agricultural colleges. The academy was merged with the Lviv Polytechnic in 1919. Another important college of the interbellum period was the Academy of Foreign Trade in Lwów.

In 1873, Lviv has founded Shevchenko Scientific Society from the beginning it attracted the financial and intellectual support of writers and patrons of Ukrainian background.

In 1893 due to the change in its statute, the Shevchenko Scientific Society was transformed into a real scholarly multidisciplinary academy of sciences. Under the presidency of the historian, Mykhailo Hrushevsky, it greatly expanded its activities, contributing to both the humanities and the physical sciences, law and medicine, but most specifically once again it was concentrated on Ukrainian studies. The Soviet Union annexed the eastern half of the Second Polish Republic including the city of Lwów which capitulated to the Red Army on 22 September 1939. Upon their occupation of Lviv, the Soviets dissolved the Shevchenko society. Many of its members were arrested and either imprisoned or executed.

The local administration regularly organizes readings and events in honor of Nazi collaborators in World War II, participants in the Holocaust, such as Roman Shukhevych and the Nachtigall Battalion:

=== Mathematics ===
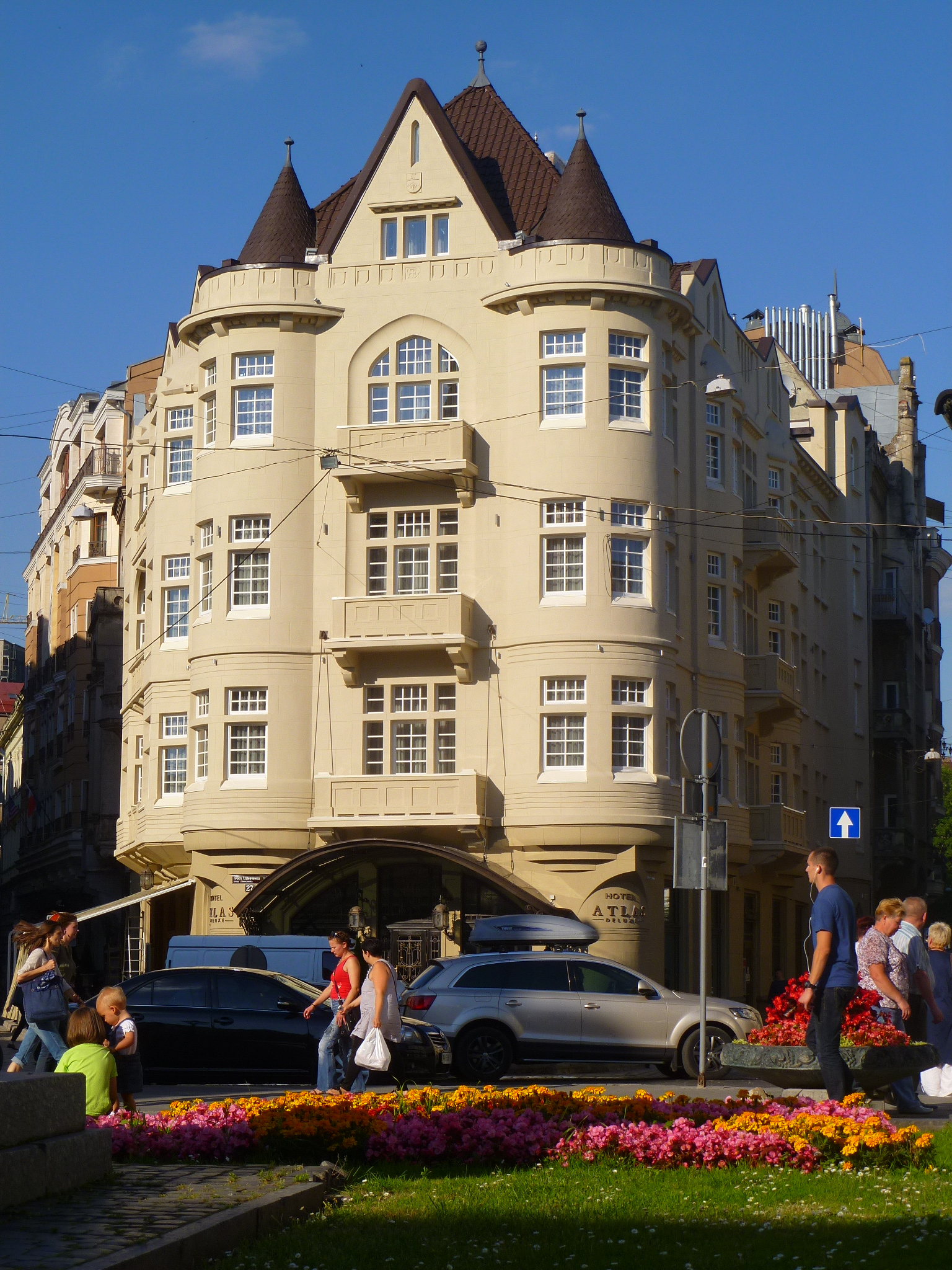
The building of the former Scottish Café

Lviv was the home of the Scottish Café, where in the 1930s and the early 1940s, Polish mathematicians from the Lwów School of Mathematics met and spent their afternoons discussing mathematical problems. Stanisław Ulam who was later a participant in the Manhattan Project and the proposer of the Teller-Ulam design of thermonuclear weapons, Stefan Banach one of the founders of functional analysis, Hugo Steinhaus, Karol Borsuk, Kazimierz Kuratowski, Mark Kac and a number of other notable mathematicians would gather there. The café building now houses the Atlas Deluxe Hotel at 27 Taras Shevchenko Prospekt (prewar Polish street name: ulica Akademicka). Mathematician Zygmunt Janiszewski died in Lviv on 3 January 1920.

=== Print and media ===
Ever since the early 1990s, Lviv has been the spiritual home of the post-independence Ukrainian-language publishing industry. Lviv Book Forum (International Publishers' Forum) is the biggest book fair in Ukraine. Lviv is the centre of promotion of the Ukrainian Latin alphabet (Latynka). The most popular newspapers in Lviv are "Vysoky Zamok", "Ekspres", "Lvivska hazeta", "Ratusha", Subotna poshta", "Hazeta po-lvivsky", "Postup" and others. Popular magazines include "Lviv Today", "Chetver", "RIA" and "Ї". "Lviv Today" is a Ukrainian English-speaking magazine, whose content includes information about the business, advertisement and entertainment spheres in Lviv, and the country in general.

The Lviv oblast television company transmits on channel 12. There are three private television channels operating from Lviv: "LUKS", "NTA" and "ZIK".

There are 17 regional and all-Ukrainian radio stations operating in the city.

A number of information agencies exist in the city such as "ZIK", "Zaxid.net", "Гал-info", "Львівський портал" and others.

Lviv is home to one of the oldest Polish-language newspapers Gazeta Lwowska which was first published in 1811 and still exists in a bi-weekly form. Among other publications were such titles as

- Kurier Lwowski: associated with people's movement which existed from 1883 to 1935. Among the writers who cooperated with it were such renowned names as Eliza Orzeszkowa, Jan Kasprowicz, Bolesław Limanowski, Władysław Orkan as well as Ivan Franko,
- Słowo Lwowskie (1895–1939): A right-wing daily which cooperated with Władysław Reymont, Henryk Sienkiewicz, Kazimierz Tetmajer, Leopold Staff, Jerzy Żuławski and Gabriela Zapolska. Among its editors-in-chief was Stanisław Grabski. In the early 20th century Słowo's circulation was 20,000 and it was the first Polish newspaper to publish a serialisation of Reymont's novel Chłopi. After World War II Słowo was moved to Wrocław with first postwar issue published on 1 November 1946.
- Czerwony Sztandar: A Soviet daily published between 1939 and 1941.

Starting in the 20th century a new movement started with authors from Central Europe. In Lviv a small neo-romantic group of authors formed around the lyricist Schmuel Jankev Imber. Small print offices produced collections of modern poems and short stories and through emigration a large networkwas established. A second smaller group in the 1930s tried to create a connection between avantgarde art and Yiddish culture. Members of this group were Debora Vogel, Rachel Auerbach and Rachel Korn. The Holocaust destroyed this movement with Debora Vogel amongst a number of other Yiddish authors murdered by the Germans in the 1940s.

=== In cinema and literature ===
- The book Tango of Death based on the true story of Jacob Mund, his orchestra, and dozens of thousands of other Jews who lived in Lviv at World War II. The book includes 60 documentary photos to show the violent truth of the Holocaust.
- The 2011 film In Darkness, Poland's entry in the 84th Academy Awards category for Best Foreign Film, is based on a true incident in Nazi-occupied Lviv.
- Some of the Austrian road-movie Blue Moon was shot in Lviv.
- Parts of the film and novel Everything Is Illuminated take place in Lviv.
- Brian R. Banks' Muse & Messiah: The Life, Imagination & Legacy of Bruno Schulz (1892–1942) has several pages which discuss the history and cultural-social life of the Lviv region. The book includes a CD-ROM with old and new photographs and the first English map of nearby Drohobych.
- The book The Girl in the Green Sweater: A Life in Holocaust's Shadow by Krystyna Chiger takes place in Lviv.
- Large parts of 1997 film The Truce depicting Primo Levi's war experiences were shot in Lviv.
- Large portions of the film d'Artagnan and Three Musketeers were shot in central Lviv.
- The book The Lemberg Mosaic (2011) by Jakob Weiss describes Jewish L'viv (Lemberg/Lwow/Lvov) during the period 1910–1943, focusing primarily on the Holocaust and related events.
- In the book and film The Shoes of the Fisherman the Metropolitan Archbishop of Lviv is released from a Soviet labor camp and later elected Pope.
- The 2015 film Varta 1, a movie which demonstrates the search for a new cinema features among young Ukrainian directors. The film uses the radio talks of the automobile patrols of activists of Lviv during EuroMaydan and it was made to create a better understanding of the nature of the revolution. The movie was shot and made in Lviv city.
- In the book East West Street: On the Origins of 'Genocide' and 'Crimes Against Humanity', Philippe Sands, a professor of law at University College London, recounts the life and work of Hersch Lauterpacht who introduced to international law the concept of the crime against humanity and Raphael Lemkin that of genocide. Both men lived and studied in Lviv.

=== Parks ===
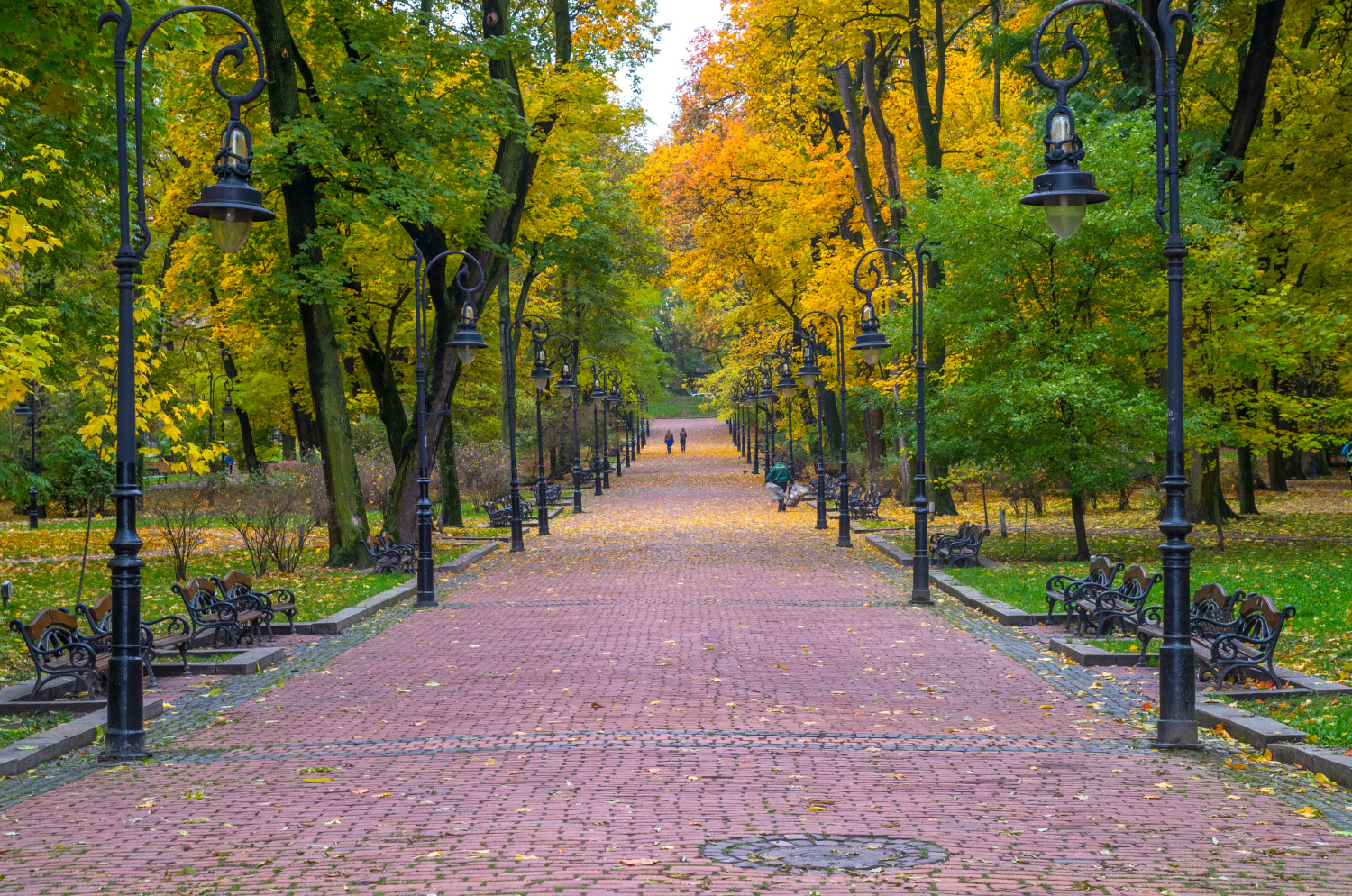
Ivan Franko Park

Lviv's architectural face is contains a number of parks, and public gardens. There are over 20 basic recreation park zones, three botanical gardens and 16 natural monuments.

- Ivan Franko Park, is the oldest park in the city. Traces of that time may be found in three-hundred-year-old oak and maple trees. Upon the abrogation of the Jesuit order in 1773 the territory became the town property. A well-known gardener Bager arranged the territory in the landscape style, and most of the trees were planted within 1885–1890.
- Bohdan Khmelnytsky Culture and Recreation Park, is one of the best organised and modern green zones containing a concert and dance hall, stadium, the town of attractions, central stage, multiple cafes and restaurants. In the park, there is a Ferris wheel.

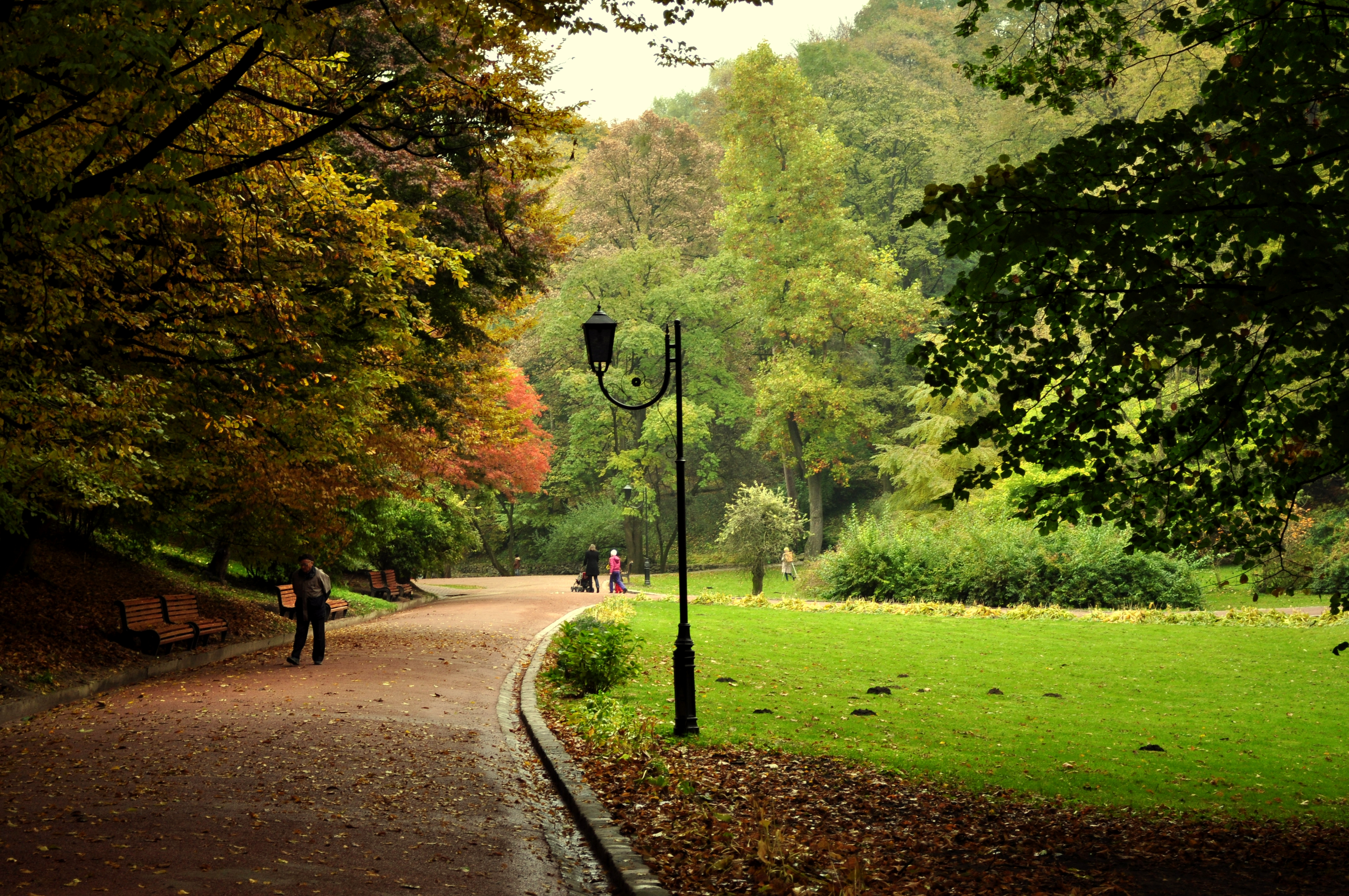
Stryiskyi Park

- Stryiskyi Park, is on the hills of the Lviv Heights is considered one of the most picturesque parks in the city. Designed in the 1870s by architect Arnold Roering, the park hosted around 1.1 million visitors to the Regional Exhibition of 1894, which was held inside the park's almost 50 hectares (approximately 120 acres). The park numbers over 200 species of trees and plants. It is well known for a vast collection of rare and valuable trees and bushes. At the main entrance gate, you will find a pond with swans. Stryiskyi Park features a fountain statue of folk character, Ivasyk Telesyk, riding geese.
- Znesinnia Park is an ideal site for cycling, skiing sports, and hiking. Public organisations favour conducting summer camps here (ecological and educational, educational and cognitive).
- Shevchenkivskyi Hai, in the park there is an open-air museum of Ukrainian wooden architecture.
- High Castle Park, the park is situated on the highest city hill (413 m or 1,355 ft) and occupies the territory of 36 ha (89 acres) consisting of the lower terrace once called Knyazha Hora (Prince Mount), and the upper terrace with a television tower and artificial embankment.
- Zalizni Vody Park, the park originated from the former garden Zalizna Voda (Iron water) combining Snopkivska street with Novyi Lviv district. The park owes its name to the springs with high iron concentration. This park with ancient beech trees and a number of paths is a favourite place for locals.
- Lychakivskyi Park, founded in 1892 and named after the surrounding suburbs. A botanic garden is situated on the park territory, founded in 1911 and occupying the territory of 18.5 ha (45.7 acres).

== Sports ==
Lviv is regarded as the birthplace of Polish association football, and is the Polish birthplace of other sports. In January 1905 the first Polish ice-hockey match took place there and two years later the first ski-jumping competition was organised in nearby Sławsko. In the same year, the first Polish basketball games were organised in Lviv's gymnasiums. In autumn 1887 a gymnasium by Lychakiv Street (pol. ulica Łyczakowska) held the first Polish track and field competition with such sports as the long jump and high jump. Lviv's athlete Władysław Ponurski represented Austria in the 1912 Olympic Games in Stockholm. On 9 July 1922 the first official rugby game in Poland took place at the stadium of Pogoń Lwów in which the rugby team of Orzeł Biały Lwów divided itself into two teams – "The Reds" and "The Blacks". The referee of this game was a Frenchman by the name of Robineau.

=== Association football ===
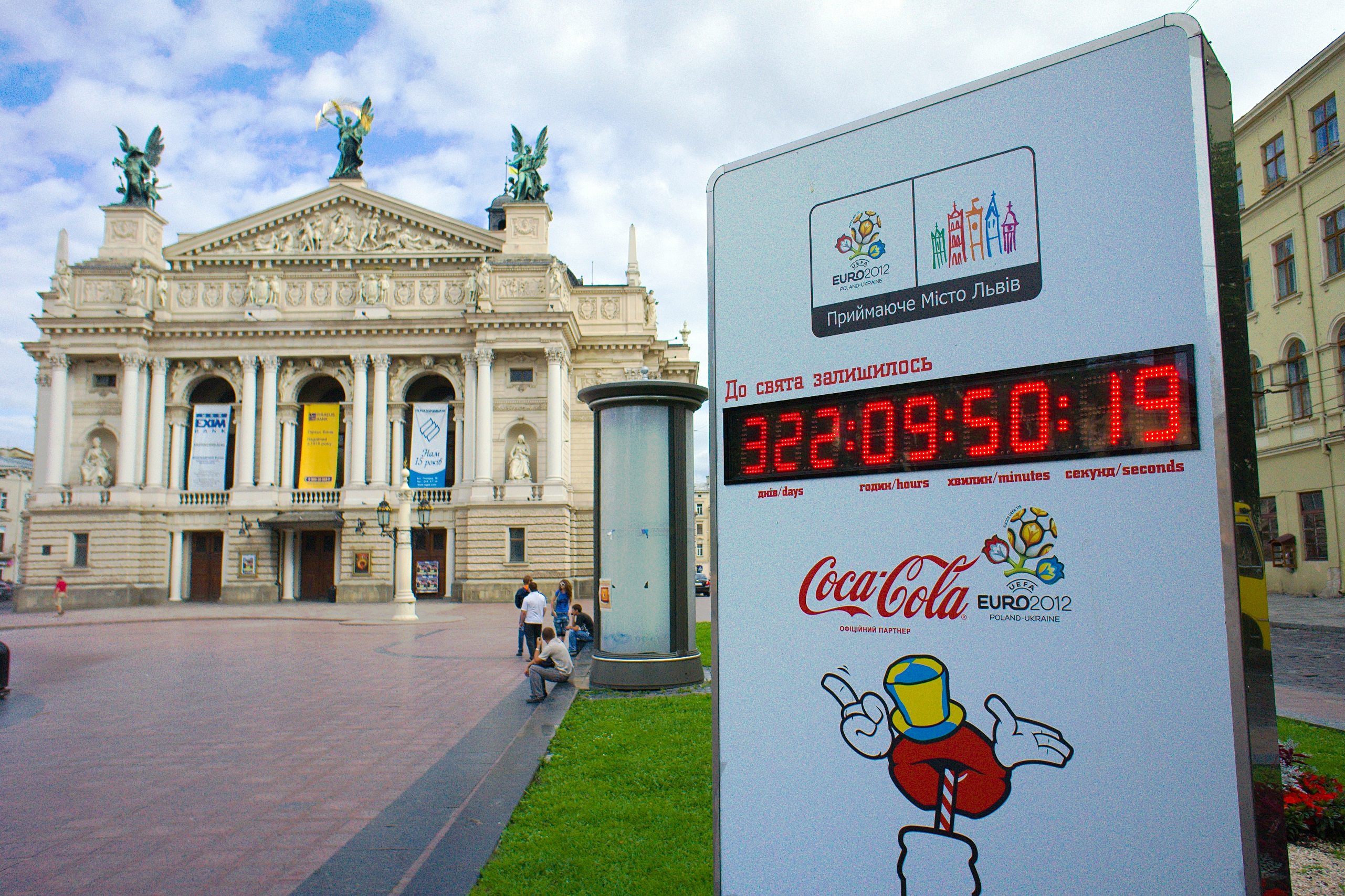
A clock in Lviv on Prospekt Svobody (Freedom Ave.), showing time to start of EURO 2012. Opera and Ballet Theatre in background

The first known official goal in a Polish football match was scored at Pogoń Lwów on 14 July 1894 during the Lwów-Kraków game. The goal was scored by Włodzimierz Chomicki who represented the team of Lviv. In 1904 Kazimierz Hemerling from Lviv published the first translation of the rules of football into Polish and another native of Lviv, Stanisław Polakiewicz, became the first officially recognised Polish referee in 1911 the year in which the first Polish Football Federation was founded in Lviv.

The first Polish professional football club, Czarni Lwów opened here in 1903 and the first stadium, which belonged to Pogoń, in 1913. Another club, Pogoń Lwów, was four times football champion of Poland (1922, 1923, 1925 and 1926). In the late 1920s, as many as four teams from the city played in the Polish Football League (Pogoń, Czarni, Hasmonea and Lechia). Hasmonea was the first Jewish football club in Poland. Several notable figures of Polish football came from the city including Kazimierz Górski, Ryszard Koncewicz, Michał Matyas and Wacław Kuchar.

In the period 1900–1911 opened the most famous football clubs in Lviv. Professor Ivan Bobersky has based in the Academic grammar school the first Ukrainian sports circle where schoolboys were engaged in track and field, football, boxing, hockey, skiing, tourism and sledge sports in 1906. He organised the "Ukrainian Sports circle" in 1908. Much its pupils in due course in 1911 formed a sports society with the loud name "Ukraine" – the first Ukrainian football club in Lviv.

Lviv now has several major professional football clubs and some smaller clubs. Two teams from the city, FC Rukh Lviv and FC Lviv, currently play in the Ukrainian Premier League, the top level of football in the country. FC Karpaty Lviv, founded in 1963, has historically been the largest club in the city.

=== Stadiums ===
- Ukraina Stadium, which was leased to FC Karpaty Lviv until 2018.
- Arena Lviv is a brand-new football stadium that was an official venue for Euro 2012 Championship games in Lviv. Construction work began on 20 November 2008 and was completed by October 2011. The opening ceremony took place on 29 October, with a vast theatrical production dedicated to the history of Lviv. Arena Lviv is the home ground of FC Lviv, and played host to Shakhtar Donetsk between 2014 and 2016 due to the ongoing war in Donbas.
- SKA Stadium, football and motorcycle speedway stadium, which holds 23,040 spectators.

=== Other sports ===
Lviv's chess school enjoys a good reputation; such notable grandmasters as Vasyl Ivanchuk, Leonid Stein, Alexander Beliavsky, Andrei Volokitin used to live in Lviv. Grandmaster Anna Muzychuk lives in Lviv.

Lviv Speedway is a motorcycle speedway team based at the SKA Stadium.

Lviv made a bid to host the 2022 Winter Olympics, which was withdrawn in June 2014.

== Tourism ==
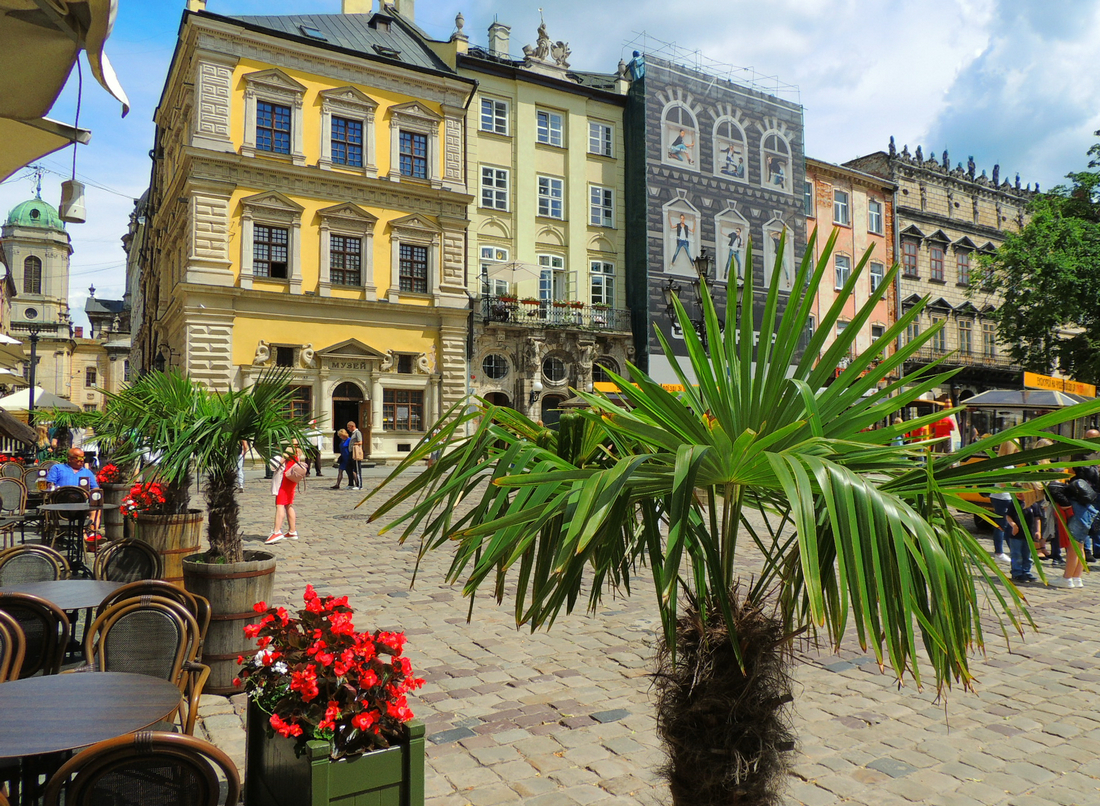
Market (Rynok) Square

Due to a comprehensive cultural programme and tourism infrastructure (having more than 8,000 hotel rooms, over 1,300 cafes and restaurants, free Wi-Fi zones in the city centre, and connection with multiple countries of the world), Lviv is considered one of Ukraine's major tourist destinations. The city had a 40% increase in tourist visits in the early 2010s; the highest rate in Europe.

The most popular tourist attractions include the Old Town, and the Market Square (Ukrainian: Ploshcha Rynok) which is an 18,300 m^{2} (196,980 sq ft) square in the city centre where the City Hall is situated, as well as the Black House (Ukrainian: Chorna Kamianytsia), Armenian Cathedral, the complex of the Dormition Church which is the main Orthodox church in the city; the St. Peter and Paul Church of the Jesuit Order (one of the largest churches in Lviv); along with the Korniakt Palace, now part of the Lviv History Museum.

Other prominent sites include the Latin Cathedral of the Assumption of Mary; St. George's Cathedral of the Greek-Catholic Church; the Dominican Church of Corpus Christi; Chapel of the Boim family; the Lviv High Castle (Ukrainian: Vysokyi Zamok) on a hill overlooking the centre of the city; the Union of Lublin Mound; the Lychakivskiy Cemetery where the notable people were buried; and the Svobody Prospekt which is Lviv's central street. Other popular places include Lviv Theatre of Opera and Ballet, the Potocki Palace, and the Bernardine Church.

Landmarks and points of interest

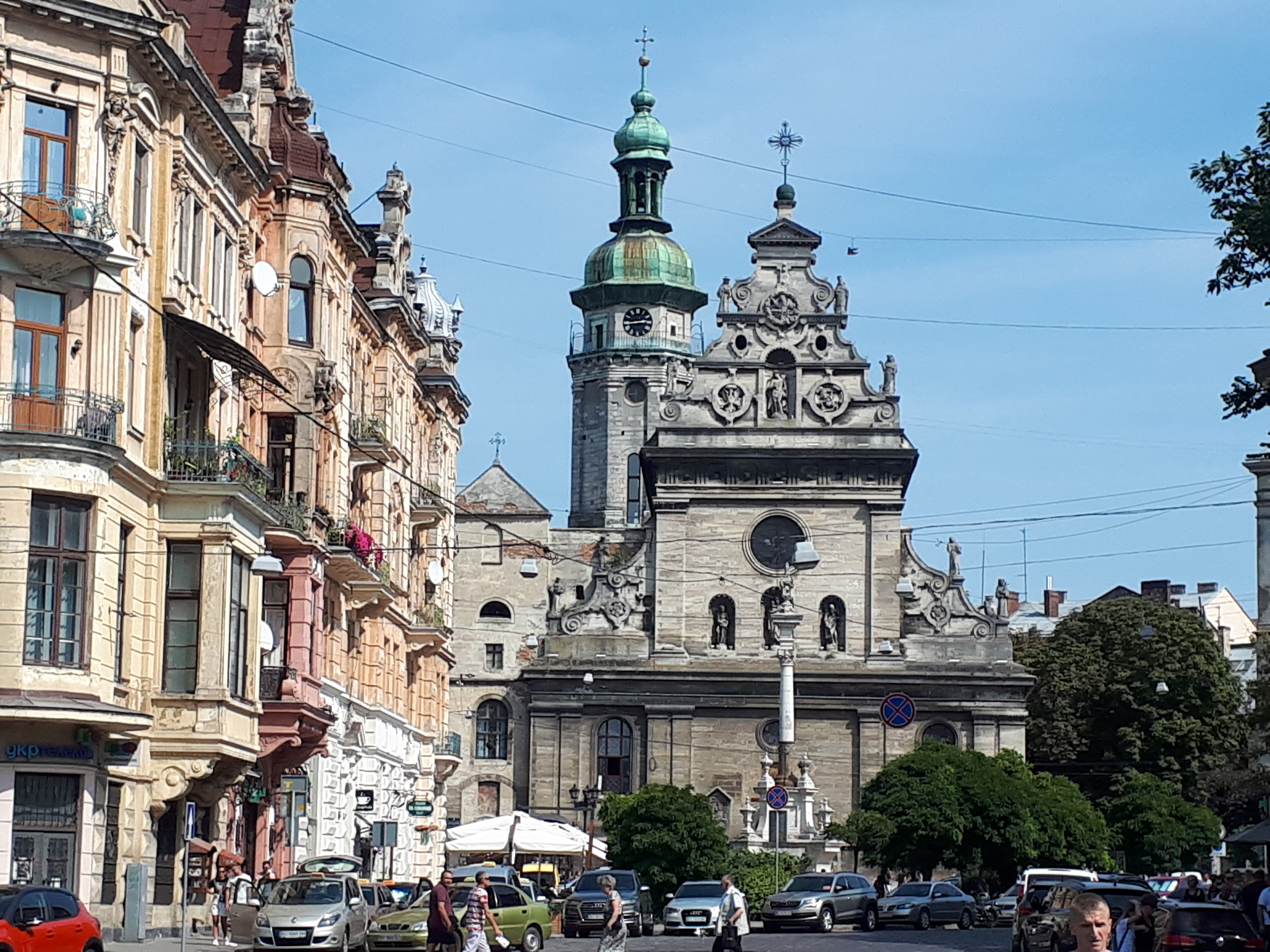
Bernardine Church

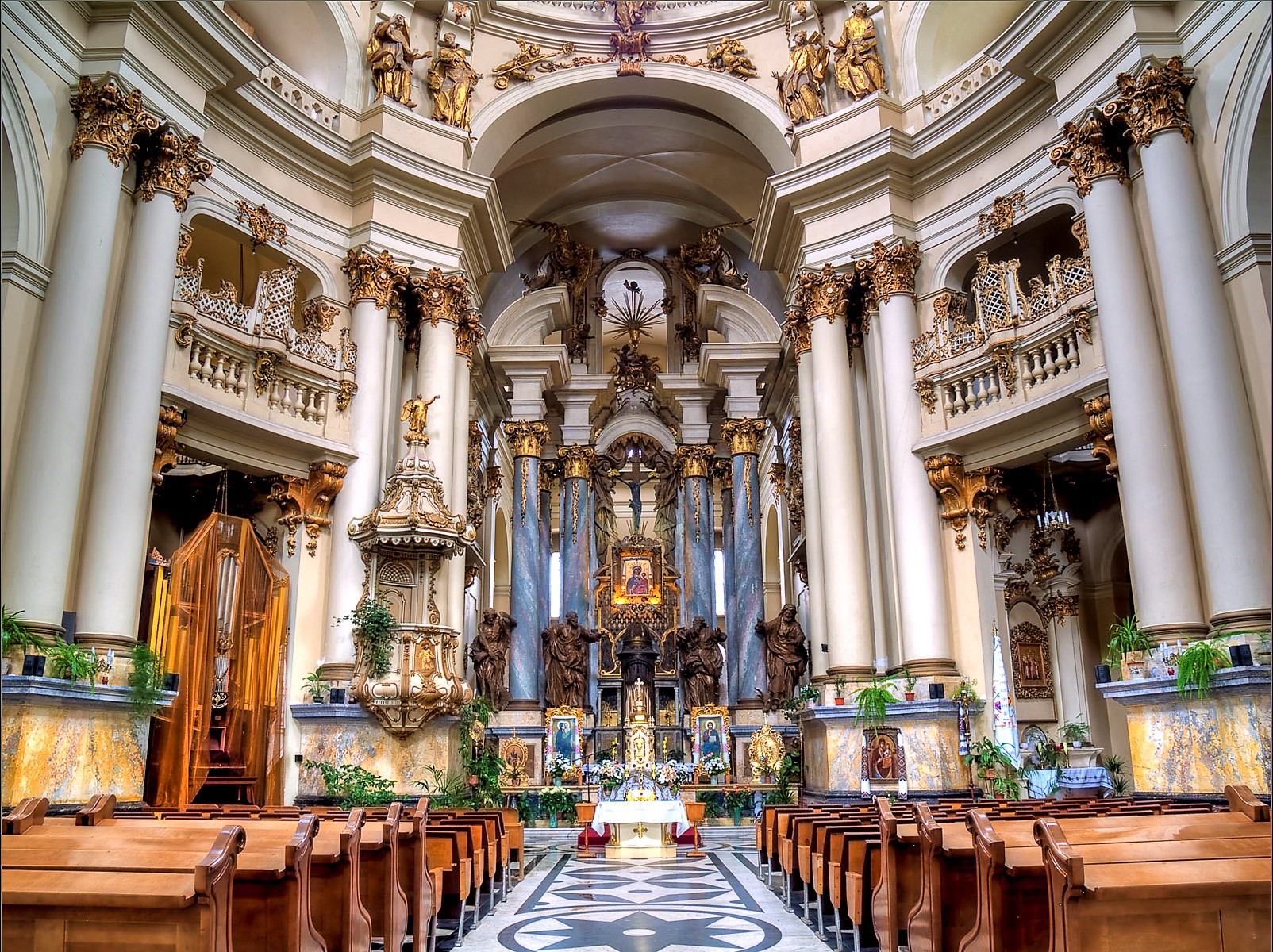
Dominican Church

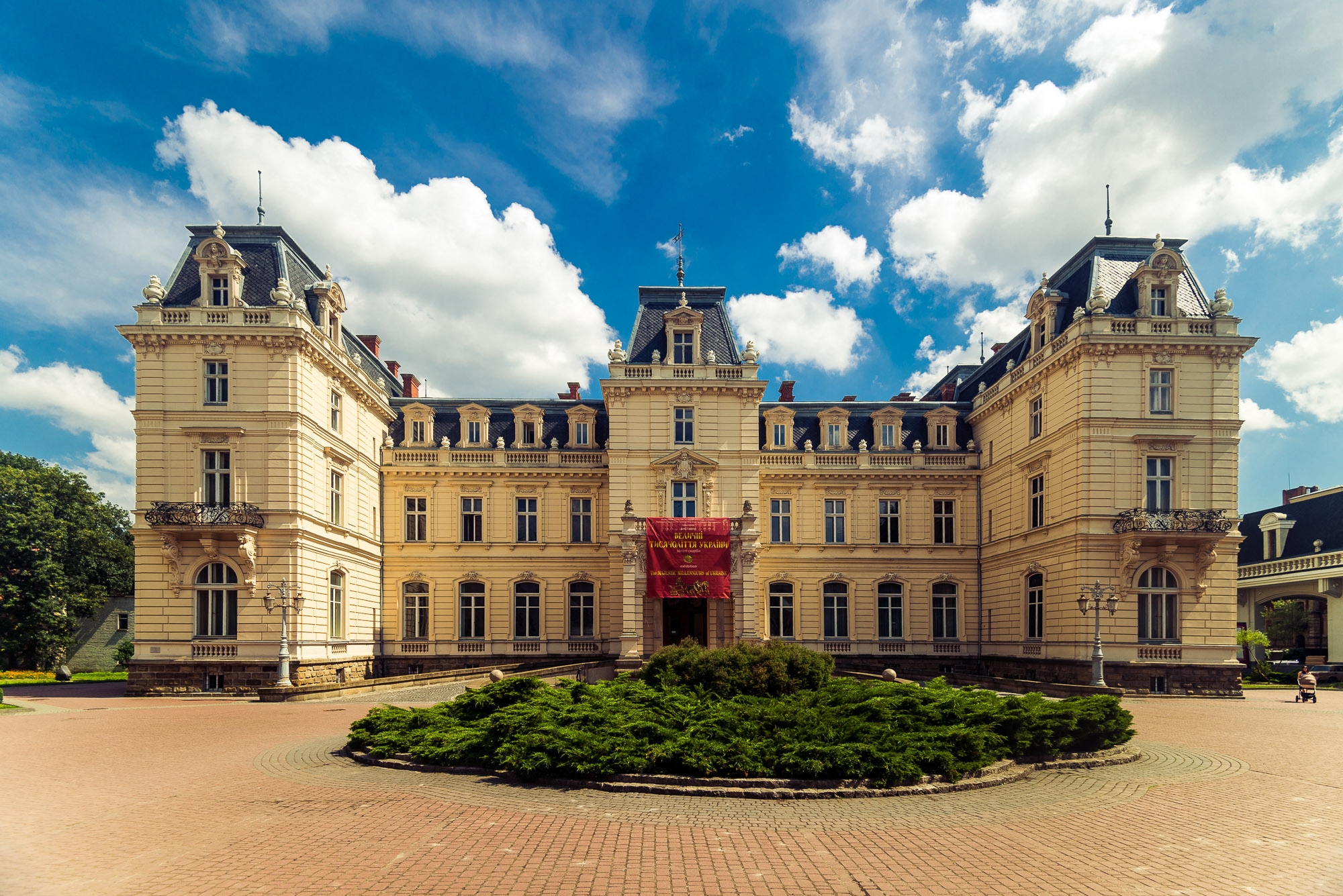
Potocki Palace

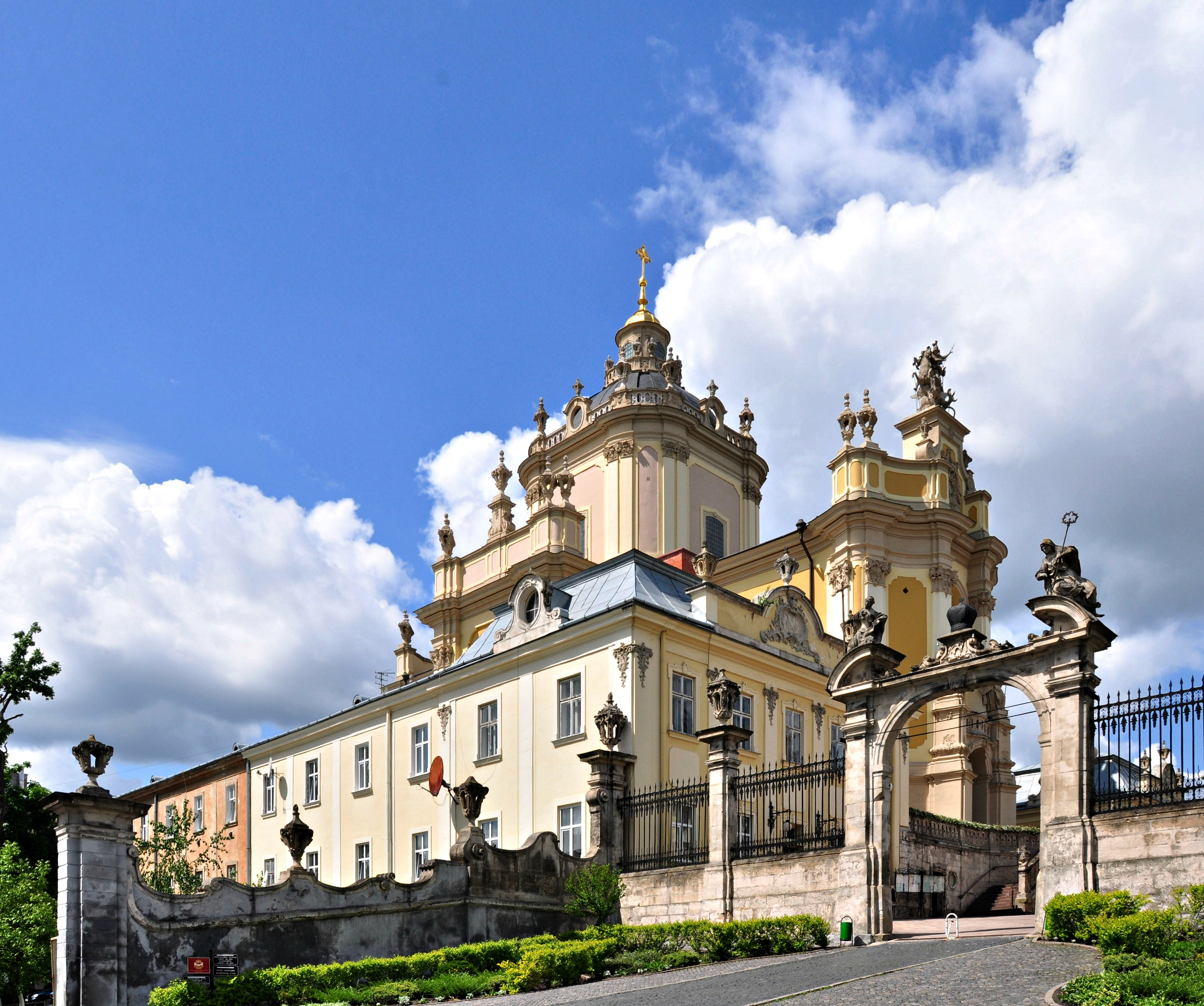
St. George's Cathedral, Lviv

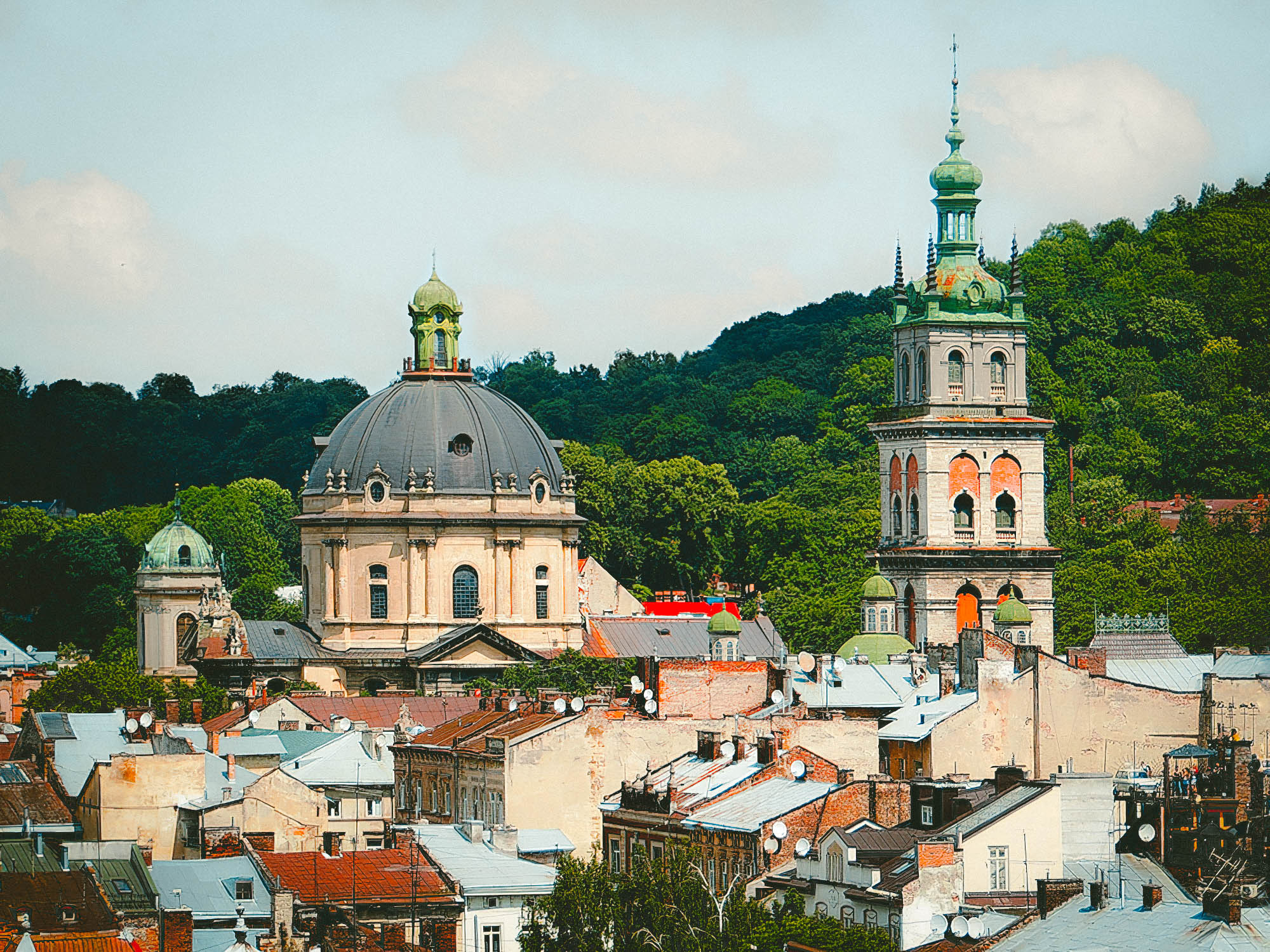
View of Old Town, a UNESCO World Heritage Site

== Popular culture ==
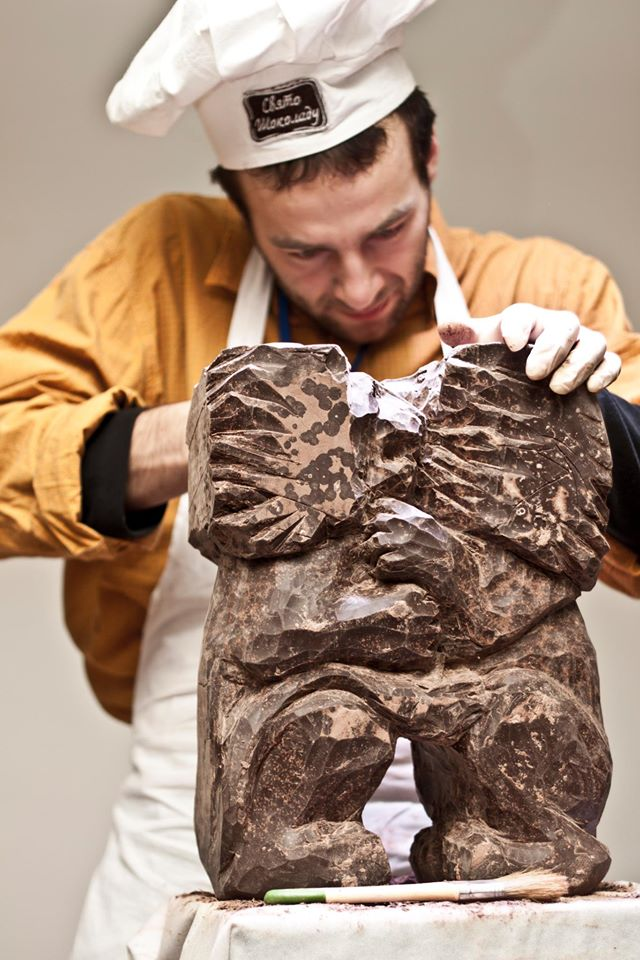
A confectioner makes chocolate lions at the Festival of Chocolate

The native residents of the city are jokingly known as the Lvivian batiary (someone who's mischievous). Lvivians are also well known for their way of speaking that was greatly influenced by the Lvivian gwara (talk). Wesoła Lwowska Fala (Polish for Lwów's Merry Wave) was a weekly radio program of the Polish Radio Lwow with Szczepko and Tonko, later starring in Będzie lepiej and The Vagabonds. The Shoes of the Fisherman, both Morris L. West's novel and its 1968 film adaptation, had the titular pope as having been its former archbishop.

Lviv has established a number of city feasts, such as coffee and chocolate feasts, cheese & wine holiday, the feast of pampukh, the Day of Batyar, Annual Bread Day and others. Over 50 festivals happen in Lviv, such as Leopolis Jazz Fest, an international jazz festival; the Leopolis Grand Prix, an international festival of vintage cars; international festival of academic music Virtuosi; Stare Misto Rock Fest; medieval festival Lviv Legend; international Etnovyr folklore festival, initiated by UNESCO; international festival of visual art Wiz-Art; international theatrical festival Golden Lion; Lviv Lumines Fluorescent Art Festival; Festival of Contemporary Dramaturgy; international contemporary music festival Contrasts; Lviv international literary festival, Krayina Mriy; gastronomic festival Lviv on a Plate; organ music festival Diapason; international independent film festival KinoLev; international festival LvivKlezFest; and international media festival MediaDepo.

Lviv honors the memory of Stepan Bandera and Roman Shukhevych. The Lviv regional council approved an appeal to the Cabinet of Ministers of Ukraine on March 16, 2021, requesting that the largest stadium here be renamed after these two men. Bandera led the Ukrainian Insurgent Army, which fought alongside Nazi Germany during WWII, killing thousands of Jews and Poles. In 1940, Shukhevych commanded a military unit of the Organization of Ukrainian Nationalists (OUN) that actively collaborated with the Nazis.

== Public transport ==
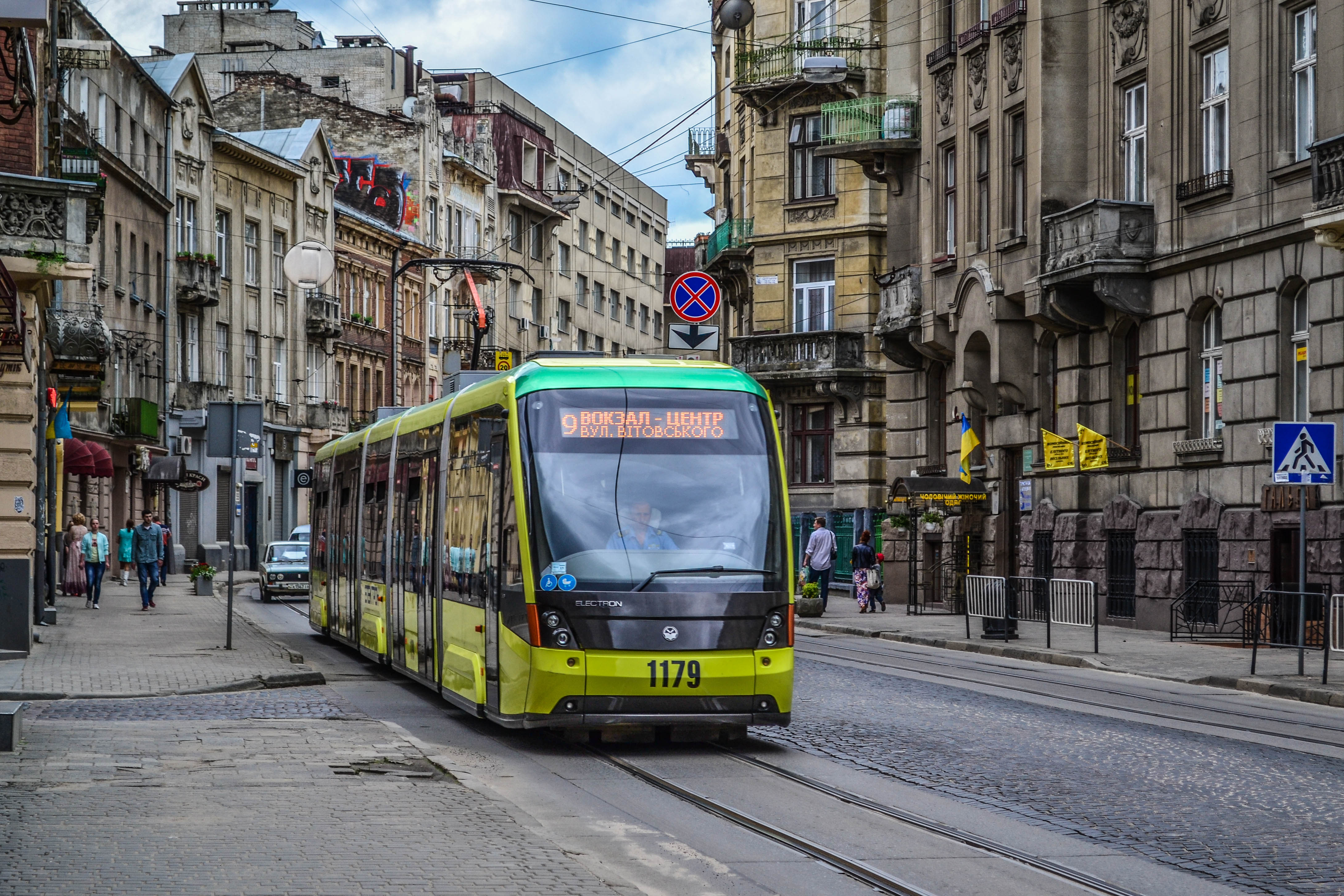
A Lviv tram in the Old Town

Historically, the first horse-drawn tramway lines in Lviv were inaugurated on 5 May 1880. An electric tram was introduced on 31 May 1894. The last horse-drawn line was transferred to electric traction in 1908. In 1922 the tramways were switched to driving on the right-hand side. After the annexation of the city by the Soviet Union, several lines were closed but most of the infrastructure was preserved. The tracks were narrow-gauge, unusual for the Soviet Union, but explained by the fact that the system was built while the city was part of the Austro-Hungarian Empire and needed to run in narrow medieval streets in the centre of town.

The Lviv tramway system now runs about 220 cars on 75 km (47 mi) of track. Multiple tracks were reconstructed around 2006. The price in February 2019 of a tram/trolleybus ticket was 5 UAH (the reduced fare ticket was 2.5 UAH, e.g. for students). The ticket may be purchased from the driver.

After World War II the city grew rapidly due to evacuees returning from Russia, and the Soviet Government's vigorous development of heavy industry. This included the transfer of entire factories from the Urals and others to the newly "liberated" territories of the USSR. The city centre tramway lines were replaced with trolleybuses on 27 November 1952. New lines were opened to the blocks of flats at the city outskirts.

The network now runs about 100 trolleybuses – mostly of the 1980s Skoda 14Tr and LAZ 52522. From 2006 to 2008 11 modern low-floor trolleybuses (LAZ E183) built by the Lviv Bus Factory were purchased. The public bus network is represented by mini-buses (so-called marshrutka) and large buses mainly LAZ and MAN. On 1 January 2013, the city had 52 public bus routes.

=== Railways ===
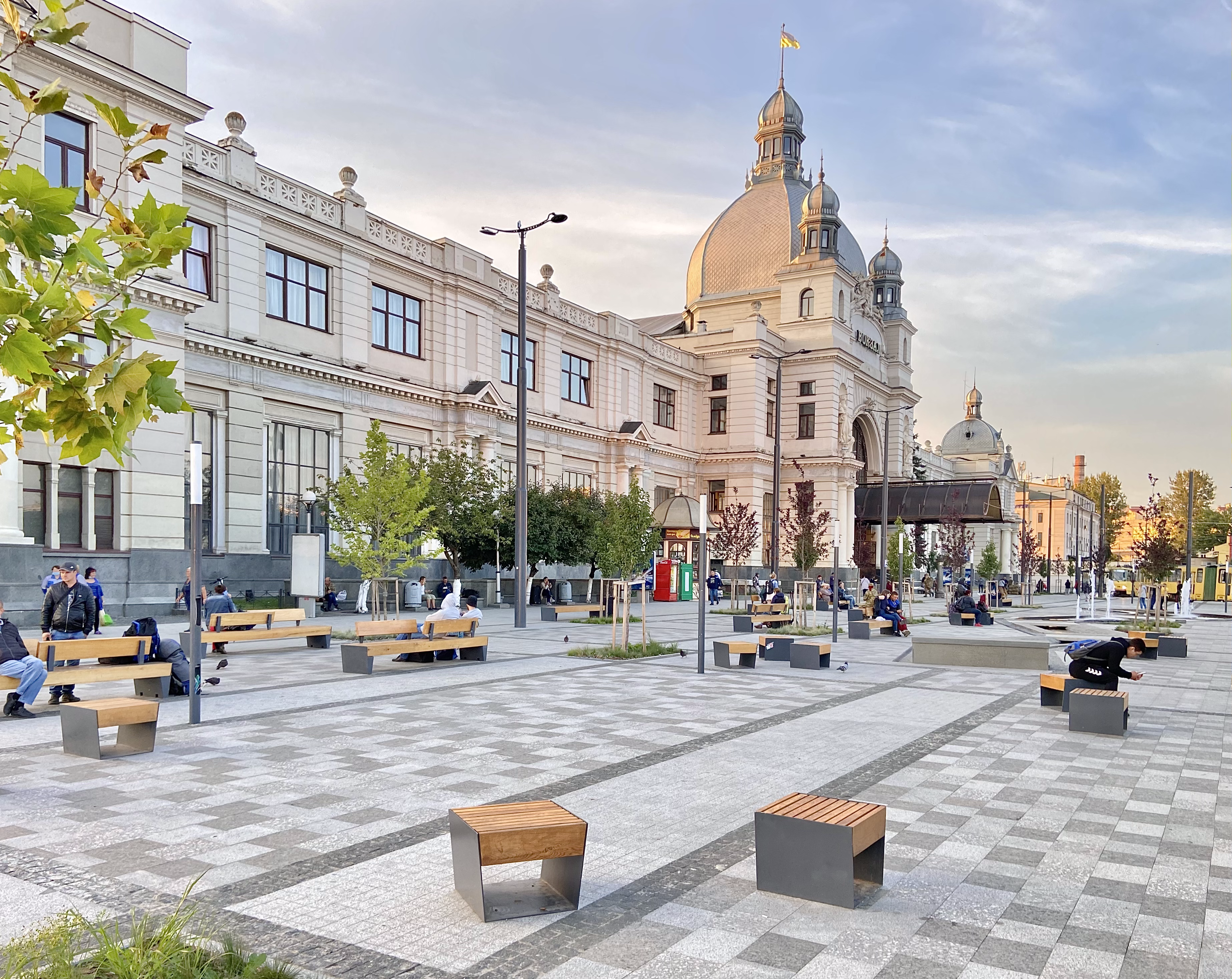
Lviv's Main Railway Terminal

Modern Lviv remains a hub on which nine railways converge providing local and international services. Lviv railway is one of the oldest in Ukraine. The first train arrived in Lviv on 4 November 1861. The main Lviv Railway Station, designed by Władysław Sadłowski, was built in 1904 and was considered one of the best in Europe from both the architectural and technical aspects.

In the inter-war period, Lviv (known then as Lwów) was one of the most important hubs of the Polish State Railways. The Lwów junction consisted of four stations in mid-1939 – main station Lwów Główny (now Ukrainian: Lviv Holovnyi), Lwów Kleparów (now Lviv Klepariv), Lwów Łyczaków (now Lviv Lychakiv), and Lwów Podzamcze (now Lviv Pidzamche). In August 1939 just before World War II, 73 trains departed daily from the Main Station including 56 local and 17 fast trains. Lwów was directly connected with all major centres of the Second Polish Republic as well as such cities as Berlin, Bucharest, and Budapest.

Currently, several trains cross the nearby Polish–Ukrainian border (mostly via Przemyśl in Poland). There are good connections to Slovakia (Košice) and Hungary (Budapest). A number of routes have overnight trains with sleeping compartments. Lviv railway is often called the main gateway from Ukraine to Europe although buses are often a cheaper and more convenient way of entering the "Schengen" countries.

Lviv used to have a Railbus, which has since been replaced with other means of public transport. It was a motor-rail car that ran from the largest district of Lviv to one of the largest industrial zones going through the central railway station. It made seven trips a day and was meant to provide a faster and more comfortable connection between the remote urban districts. The price in February 2010 of a one-way single ride in the railbus was 1.50 UAH. On 15 June 2010, the route was cancelled as unprofitable.

=== Air transport ===
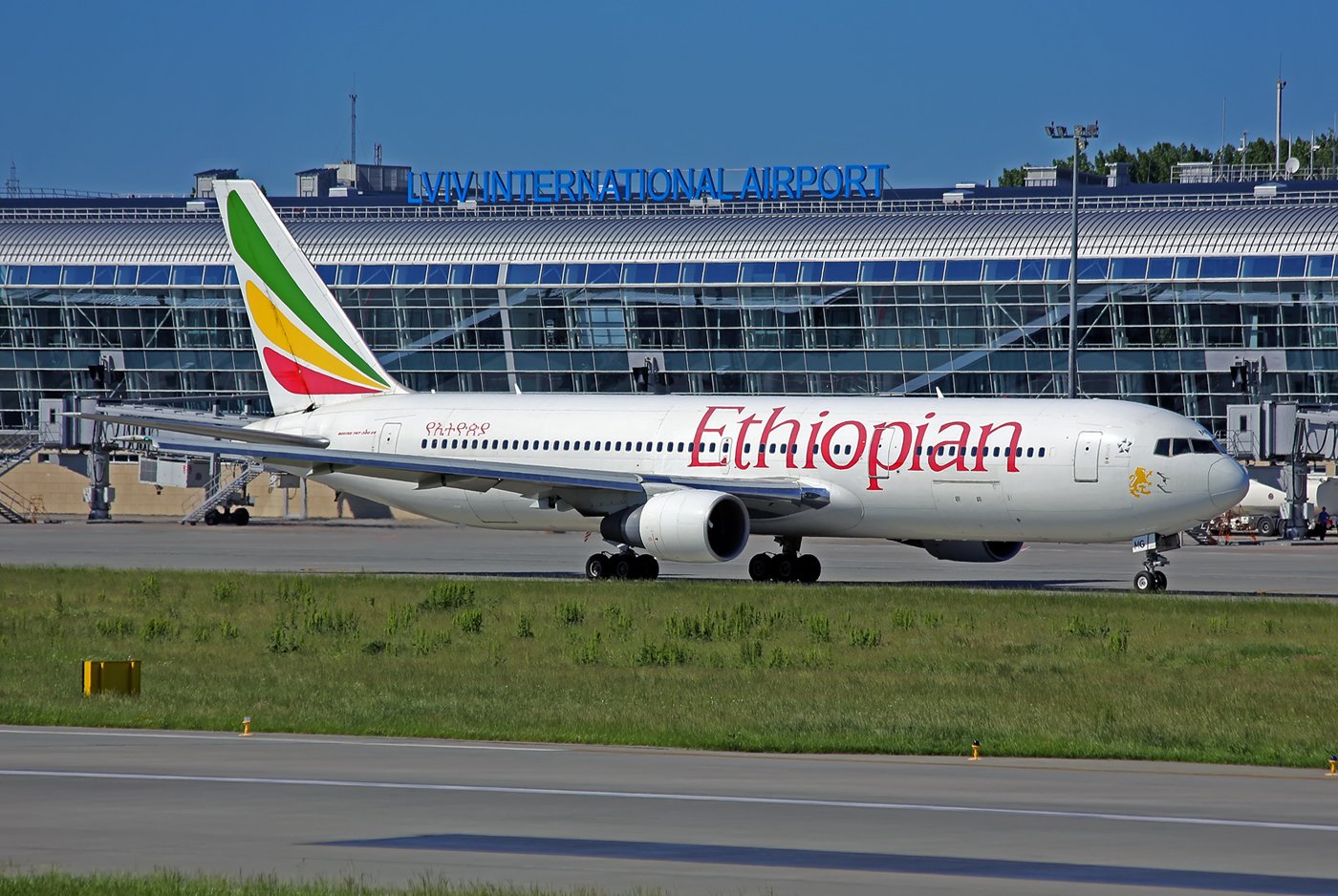
Lviv International Airport

The beginnings of aviation in Lviv reach back to 1884 when the Aeronautic Society was opened there. The society issued its own magazine Astronauta but soon ceased to exist. In 1909 on the initiative of Edmund Libanski the Awiata Society was founded. Among its members there was a group of professors and students of the Lviv Polytechnic, including Stefan Drzewiecki and Zygmunt Sochacki. Awiata was the oldest Polish organization of this kind and it concentrated its activities mainly on exhibitions such as the First Aviation Exhibition which took place in 1910 and featured models of aircraft built by Lviv students.

In 1913–1914 brothers Tadeusz and Władysław Floriańscy built a two-seater aeroplane. When World War I broke out Austrian authorities confiscated it but did not manage to evacuate the plane in time and it was seized by the Russians who used the plane for intelligence purposes. The Floriański brothers' plane was the first Polish-made aircraft. On 5 November 1918, a crew consisting of Stefan Bastyr and Janusz de Beaurain carried out the first-ever flight under the Polish flag taking off from Lviv's Lewandówka (now Ukrainian: Levandivka) airport. In the interbellum period Lwów was a major centre of gliding with a notable Gliding School in Bezmiechowa which opened in 1932. In the same year the Institute of Gliding Technology was opened in Lwów and was the second such institute in the world. In 1938 the First Polish Aircraft Exhibition took place in the city.

The interwar Lwów was also a major centre of the Polish Air Force with the Sixth Air Regiment located there. The Regiment was based at the Lwów airport opened in 1924 in the suburb of Skniłów (today Ukrainian: Sknyliv). The airport is located 6 km (4 mi) from the city centre. In 2012, after renovation, Lviv Airport got a new official name Lviv Danylo Halytskyi International Airport (LWO). A new terminal and other improvements worth under a $200 million was done in preparation for the 2012 UEFA European Football Championship. The connection from Airport to the city centre is maintained by bus No. 48 and No. 9.

=== Bicycle lanes ===
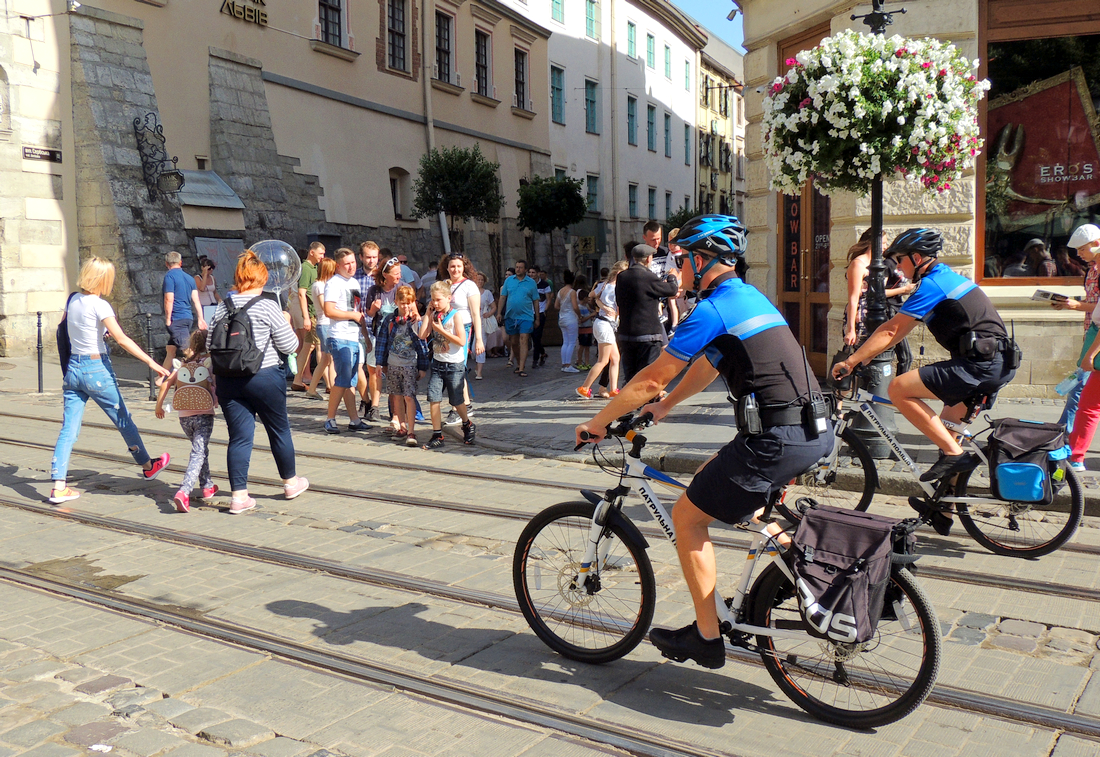
Police patrol by bicycles in the tourist area of Lviv

Cycling is a new but growing mode of transport in Lviv. In 2011 the City of Lviv ratified an ambitious 9-year program for the set-up of cycling infrastructure – until the year 2019 an overall length of 270 km (168 mi) cycle lanes and tracks shall be realized. A working group formally organised within the Lviv City Council, bringing together representatives of the city administration, members of planning and design institutes, local NGOs and other stakeholders. Events like the All-Ukrainian Bikeday or the European Mobility Week show the popularity of cycling among Lviv's citizens.

By September 2011, 8 km (5 mi) of new cycling infrastructure had been built. It can be expected that until the end of 2011 50 km (31 mi) will be ready for use. The cycling advisor in Lviv – the first such position in Ukraine – is supervising and pushing forward the execution of the cycling plan and coordinates with various people in the city. The development of cycling in Ukraine is currently hampered by outdated planning norms and the fact, that most planners didn't yet plan and experience cycling infrastructure. The update of national legislation and training for planners is therefore necessary.

In 2015, the first stations have been set up for a new bike-sharing system Nextbike – the first of its kind in Ukraine. New bike lanes are also under construction, making Lviv the most bike-friendly city in the country. The Lviv City Council plans to build an entire cycling infrastructure by 2020, with cycle lanes (268 km or 167 mi) and street bike hire services.

== Education ==
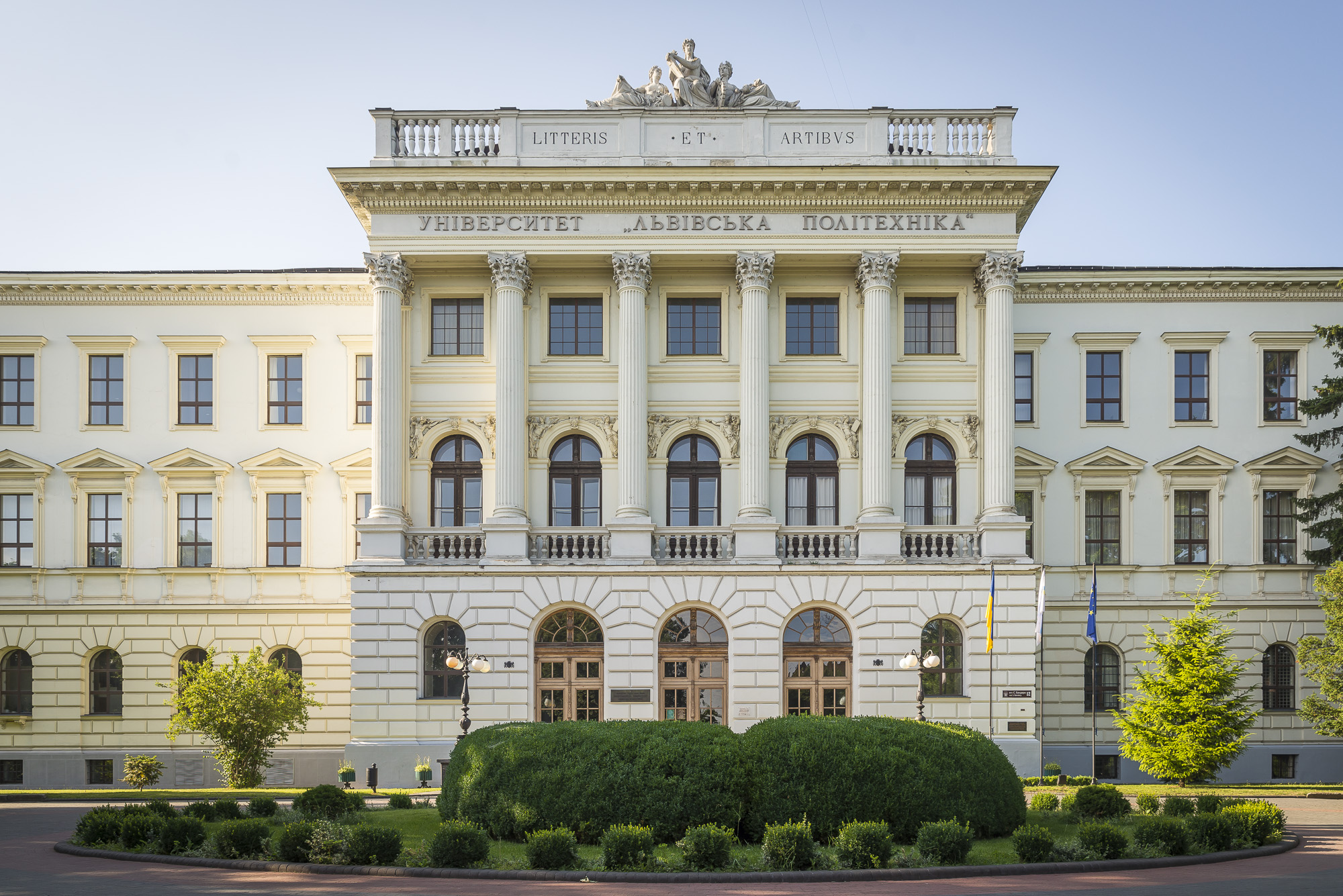
Lviv Polytechnic

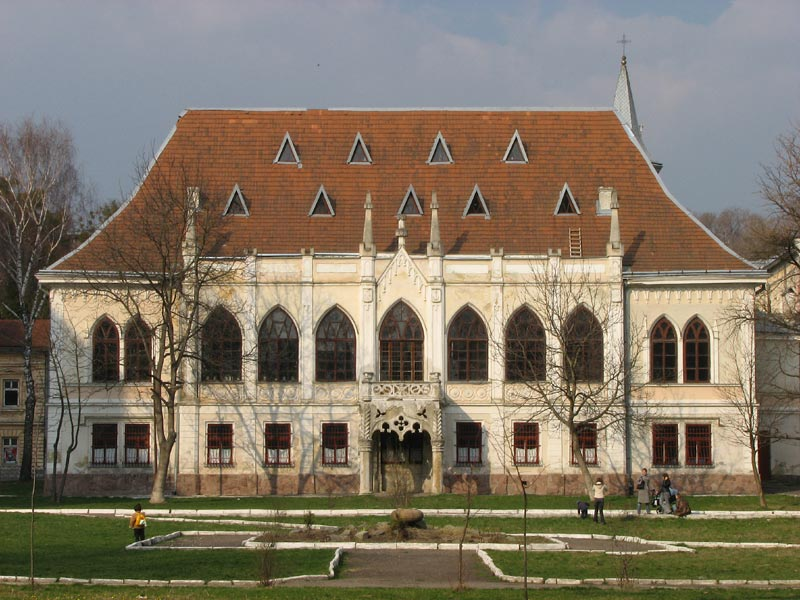
Lviv National Stepan Gzhytsky University of Veterinary Medicine and Biotechnology

Lviv is an important education centre in Ukraine. The city contains a total of 12 universities, 8 academies and a number of smaller schools of higher education. In addition, within Lviv, there is a total of eight institutes of the National Academy of Science of Ukraine and more than forty research institutes. These research institutes include the Centre of Institute for Space Research; the Institute for Condensed Matter Physics; the Institute of Cell Biology; the National Institute of Strategic Studies; the Institute of Neuro-mathematical Simulation in Power Engineering; and the Institute of Ecology of the Carpathians.

In Soviet times, the city of Lviv was the location where the software for the Lunokhod programme was developed. The technology for the Venera series probes and the first orbital shuttle Buran were also developed in Lviv.

A considerable scientific potential is concentrated in the city: by the number of doctors of sciences, candidates of sciences, scientific organisations Lviv is the fourth city in Ukraine. Lviv is also known for ancient academic traditions, founded by the Assumption Brotherhood School and the Jesuit Collegium. Over 100,000 students annually study in more than 50 higher educational establishments.

Educational level of residents:

- Basic and complete secondary education: 10%
- Specialized secondary education: 25%
- Incomplete higher education (undergraduates): 13%
- Higher education (graduates): 51%
- PhD (postgraduates): about 1%

=== Universities ===
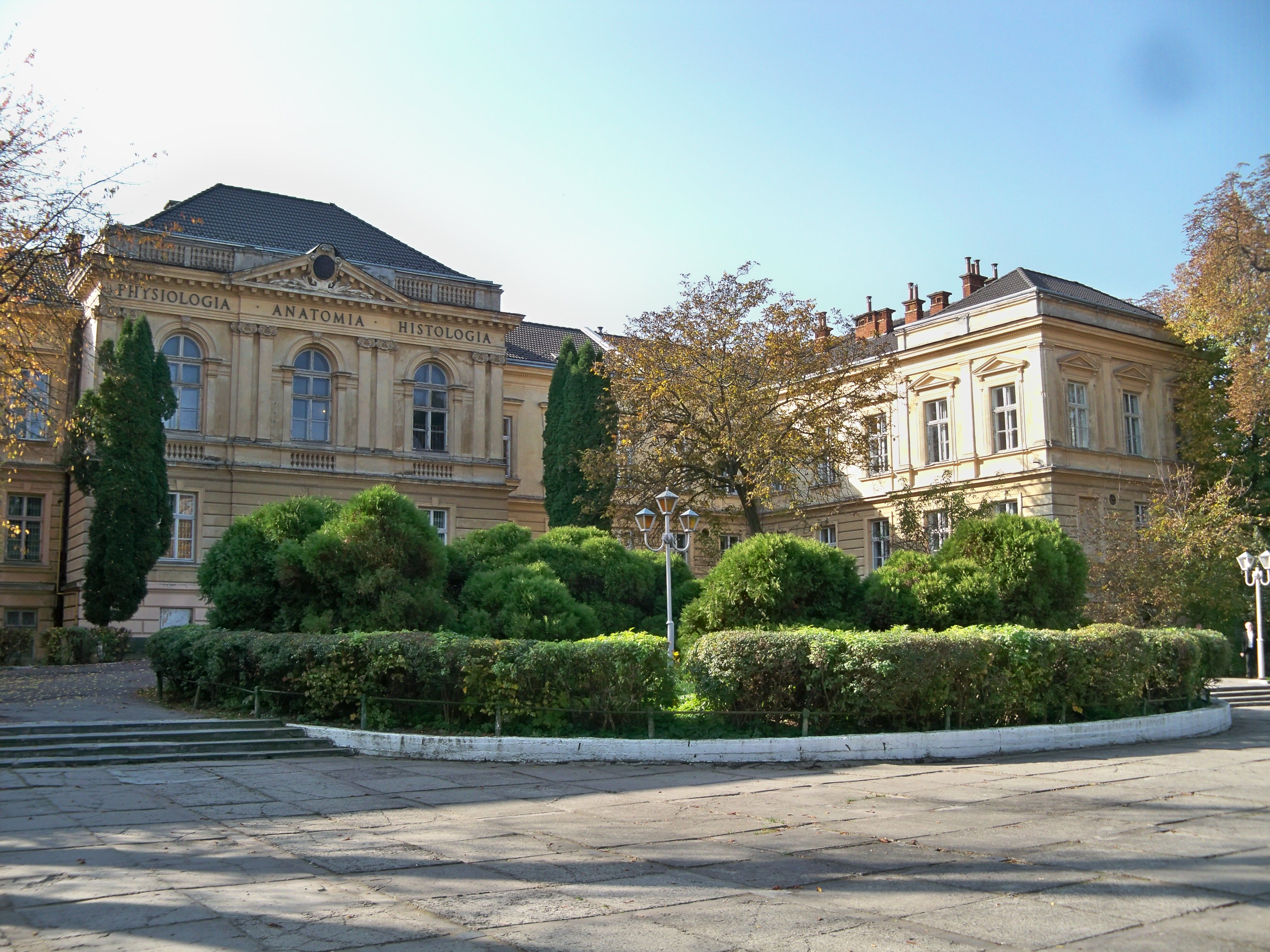
Anatomy Department Building of Danylo Halytsky Lviv National Medical University – one of the oldest and prime medical institutes of Ukraine

- Ivan Franko National University of Lviv (ukr. Львівський національний університет імені Івана Франка)
- Lviv Polytechnic (ukr. Національний університет "Львівська політехніка")
- Danylo Halytsky Lviv National Medical University (ukr. Львiвський національний медичний унiверситет iм. Данила Галицького)
- Lviv Stepan Gzhytsky national university of veterinary medicine and biotechnologies (ukr. Львівський національний університет ветеринарної медицини та біотехнологій імені Степана Гжицького)
- National Forestry Engineering University of Ukraine (ukr. Український національний лісотехнічний університет)
- Ukrainian Catholic University (ukr. Український католицький університет)
- The Lviv National Academy of Arts (ukr. Львівська національна академія мистецтв)
- Lviv National Music Academy (ukr. Львівська національна музична академія імені Миколи Лисенка)
- Lviv National Agrarian University (ukr. Львівський національний аграрний університет)
- Lviv State University of Physical Training (ukr. Львівський державний університет фізичної культури)
- Lviv Academy of Commerce (ukr. Львівська комерційна академія)
- Lviv State University of Life Safety (ukr. Львівський державний університет безпеки життєдіяльності)
- Lviv State University of Internal Affairs (ukr. Львівський державний університет внутрішніх справ)

== International relations ==
=== Twin towns – sister cities ===
Lviv is twinned with:

City	State	Year
Winnipeg	Canada	1973
Corning	United States	1987
Freiburg im Breisgau	Germany	1989
Rzeszów	Poland	1992
Rochdale	United Kingdom	1992
Budapest	Hungary	1993
Rishon LeZion	Israel	1993
Przemyśl	Poland	1995
Kraków	Poland	1995
Novi Sad	Serbia	1999
Kutaisi	Georgia	2002
Wrocław	Poland	2003
Łódź	Poland	2003
Banja Luka	Bosnia and Herzegovina	2004
Lublin	Poland	2004
Tbilisi	Georgia	2013
Parma	United States	2013
Vilnius	Lithuania	2014
Chengdu	China	2014
Cannes	France	2022
Würzburg	Germany	2023
Katowice	Poland	2023
Reykjavík	Iceland	2023
Pula	Croatia	2023
Aarhus	Denmark	2023
Tartu	Estonia	2024
Mechelen	Belgium	2024
Sorocaba	Brazil	2026

=== Partner cities ===
On 7 September 2023, the mayors of Lviv and Kobe signed a cooperation agreement. Frankfurt also signed a cooperation agreement with Lviv on 13 May 2024.

City	State	Year
Kobe	Japan	2023
Frankfurt	Germany	2024

== See also ==
- List of Lvivians
- Polish football clubs established in Lviv: Pogoń Lwów, Czarni Lwów, Lechia Lwów, Hasmonea Lwów
- Great Suburb Synagogue
- Win with the Lion
- Wanda Mejbaum-Katzenellenbogen
- Banks in Lviv
- Lviv during the Middle Ages

== Bibliography ==
- Romantsov, Roman (2012). "Żydzi na tle statystyk demograficznych Lwowa 1918-1939". Studia Żydowskie. Almanach. 2 (2): 105–136. doi:10.56583/sz.786.
