= Lviv Theatre of Opera and Ballet =

Opera theater in Lviv, Ukraine

Coordinates: 49°50′39″N 24°01′35″E

Lviv National Opera
- Львівський Національний академічний театр опери та балету імені Соломії Крушельницької
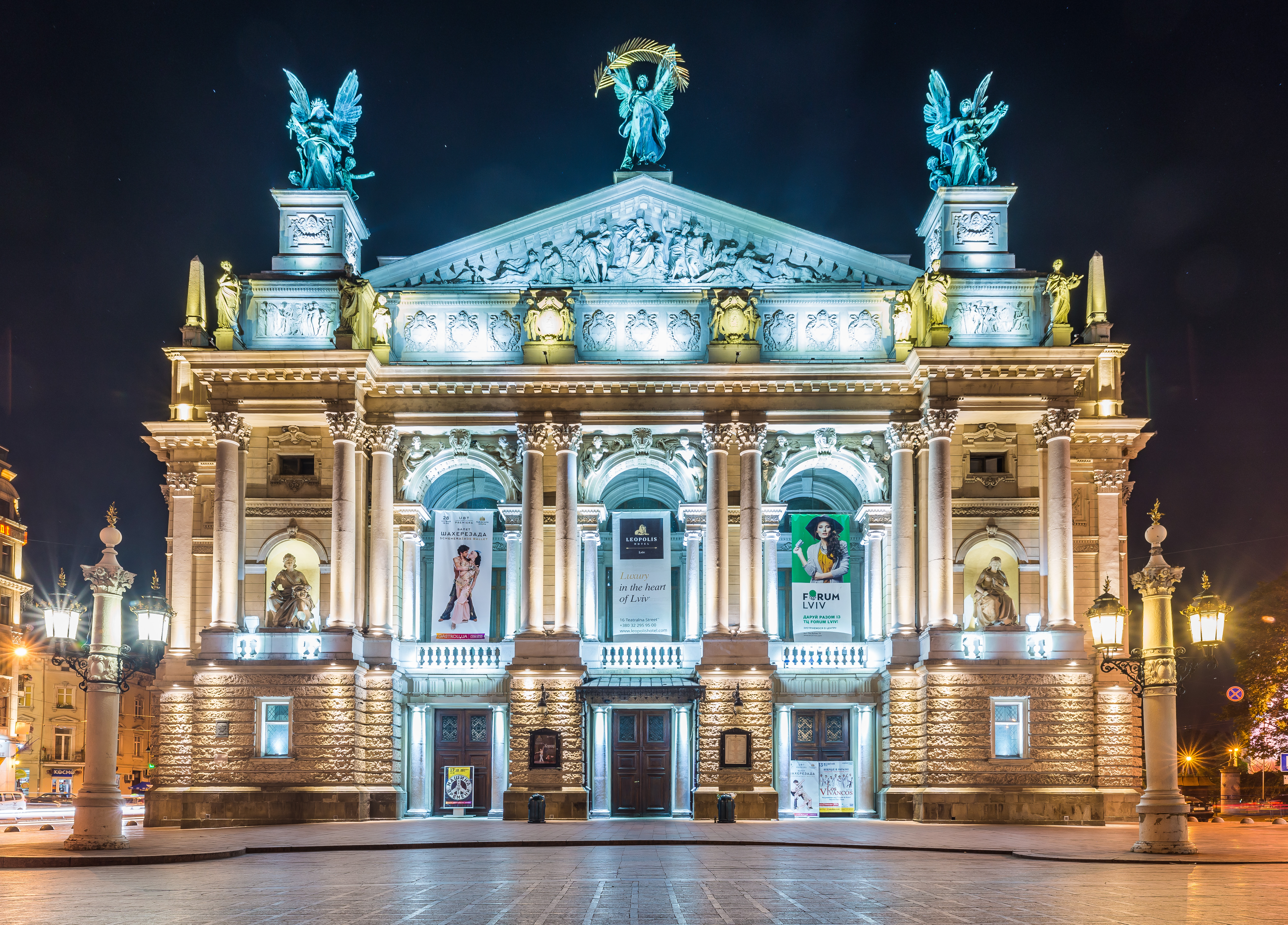
- The Lviv Opera as seen from Freedom Avenue
- Former names: Lemberger Oper, Opera Lwowska, Teatr Wielki, Solomia Krushelnytska Lviv National Academic Theatre of Opera and Ballet

General information
- Type: Opera house
- Architectural style: Renaissance Revival
- Location: Lviv, Ukraine, Svobody av., 28
- Groundbreaking: 1897
- Completed: 1900
- Opened: October 4, 1900
- Renovated: 1989–1994
- Owner: National

Design and construction
- Architect: Zygmunt Gorgolewski

Other information
- Seating capacity: 1,100

Website
- www.opera.lviv.ua

The Solomiya Krushelnytska Lviv State Academic Theatre of Opera and Ballet (Ukrainian: Львівський Національний академічний театр опери та балету імені Соломії Крушельницької, romanized: Lvivskyi Natsionalnyi akademichnyi teatr opery ta baletu imeni Solomii Krushelnytskoi) or Lviv Opera (Ukrainian: Львівська оперa, romanized: Lvivska opera, Polish: Opera Lwowska) is an opera house located in Lviv, designed by Polish architect Zygmunt Gorgolewski. The Lviv Opera is located on Freedom Avenue (Ukrainian: Проспект Свободи), the tree-lined centrepiece of Lviv's historic Old City, a UNESCO World Heritage Site located in the city's Halych district.

The building was constructed between 1897 and 1900, when Lviv was the capital of the autonomous province of Galicia in the Austro-Hungarian Empire, and known by the German name Lemberger Oper, standing at the end of Archduke Karl Ludwig Avenue. It became known as the Grand Theatre (Teatr Wielki) of the Second Polish Republic, and during the time of Soviet rule, entering patrons would pass by a towering statue of Vladimir Lenin. For four decades, the theatre was known as the Ivan Franko Lviv State Academic Theatre of Opera and Ballet, having been renamed in 1956 after the city's famous poet and political activist Ivan Franko on the centenary of his birth.

In 2000, marking its centennial, the Lviv Opera was renamed after Solomiya Krushelnytska, a renowned soprano of the early 20th century.

== History ==
=== Project and construction ===
At the end of the 19th century, the civic leaders of Lviv felt the need for a large city theatre to be situated in the capital of Galicia. In 1895, the city announced an architectural design competition, which attracted a large number of submissions. Among the participants were the Viennese architects Fellner & Helmer, whose entry was rejected as too international and eclectic. (Note: The Habsburg Empire. The World of the Austro-Hungarian Monarchy in Original Photographs 1840–1916 by Franz Hubmann, Vienna, 1971, attributes this theatre to Fellner & Helmer.)

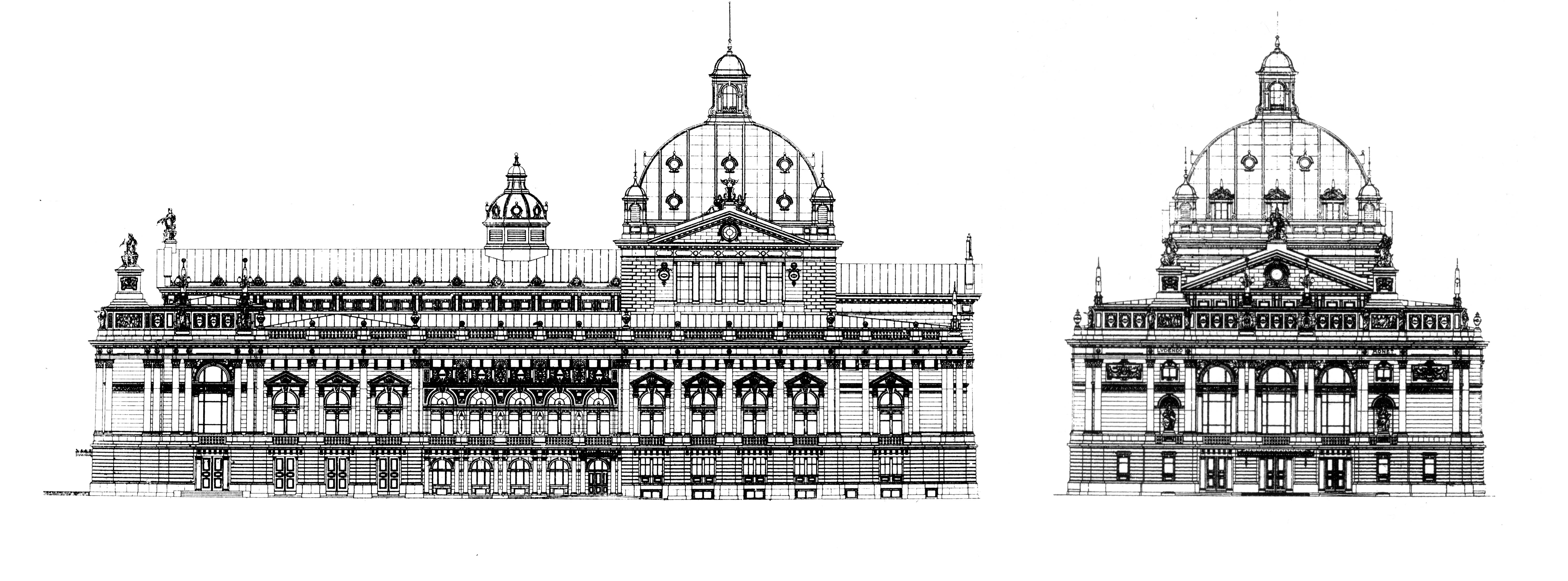
Zygmunt Gorgolewski's plan for the Lviv Opera

An independent jury chose the design by Zygmunt Gorgolewski, a graduate of the Berlin Building Academy and the director of city's Engineering Academy. Gorgolewski pleasantly surprised the jury by planning to locate the building in the centre of the city, despite the area having been already densely built-up. In order to solve the space problem, he boldly proposed to enclose the Poltva River underground, and instead of using a traditional foundation, utilized—for the first time in Europe—a reinforced concrete base.

In June 1897, the cornerstone was placed. Gorgolewski oversaw construction, earthwork and design, employing the leading stonemasons from the city and beyond. Local materials were used wherever possible, however marble elements were manufactured in Vienna, special linen for painting in the foyer was imported from Belgium. The German company Siemens, ran the electrical wiring and lights, while the hydraulic mechanization of the stage was built by the Polish railway workshop company in Sanok.

Construction continued for three years. Funding came from the city, the surrounding communities, and from voluntary donations. The cost of the works totaled 2.4 million Austrian crowns.

=== Grand opening ===
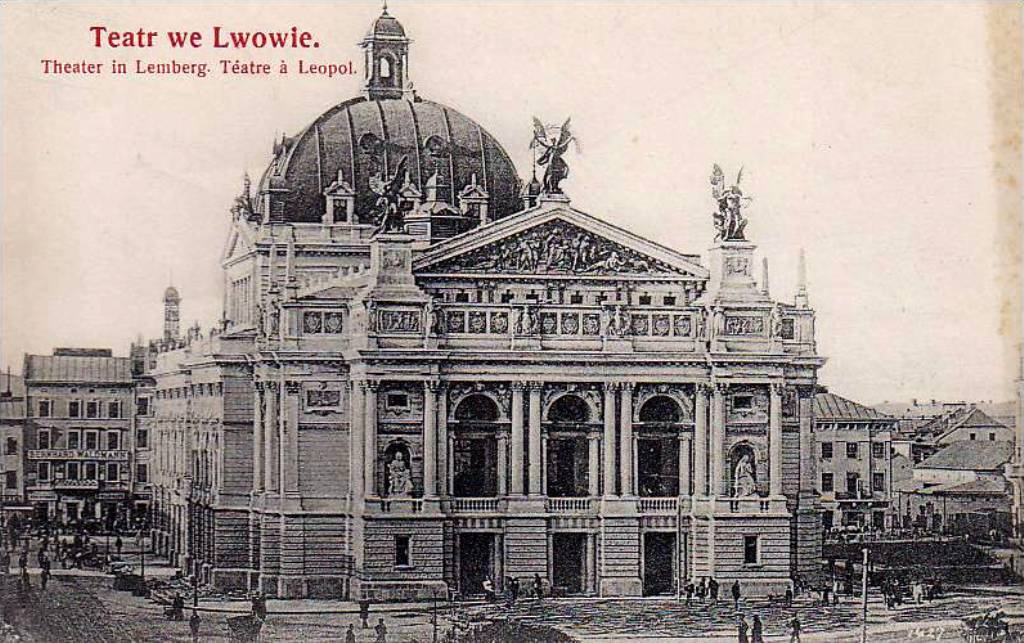
The theatre on a 1906 postcard

The Lemberger Oper opened on 4 October 1900. The cultural elite—painters, writers, and composers, as well as delegations from various European theatres—attended the opening festivities. Among the guests attending the ceremony were writer Henryk Sienkiewicz, composer Ignacy Jan Paderewski, the painter Henryk Siemiradzki, the Chief magistrate of Lviv Godzimir Małachowski, the provincial governor Leon Piniński and head of the provincial assembly Count Stanisław Badeni. Due to recent deaths of both the Roman Catholic and Greek Catholic archbishops, the building was blessed by the Armenian Catholic archbishop of Lviv, Izaak Mikołaj Isakowicz, alongside rabbi Ezechiel Caro and the Protestant pastor Garfel.

The grand opening gala that evening included excerpts from Jan Kasprowicz and Seweryn Berson's ballet Baśń nocy świętojańskiej (Tale of the Midsummer Night), Władysław Żeleński's opera Janek, and Aleksander Fredro's comedy Odludki (Recluses).

=== In Poland ===
As the Grand Theatre in the city now named Lwów as part of the Second Polish Republic (between the two world wars,from October 1918 until October 1939), singers such as Adam Didur, Ada Sari, Wanda Wermińska, and Jan Kiepura performed at the there. There were Polish premieres of foreign operas written by foreign composers, including Erich Wolfgang Korngold's Die tote Stadt (1928), and also works by Polish artists, such as Mieczysław Sołtys's Panie Kochanku (1924). There were also popular operas by Giuseppe Verdi, Georges Bizet, and Stanisław Moniuszko, and works by contemporary composers. During this period, two performances were staged with music composed or arranged by Józef Koffler: James Elroy Flecker’s play Hassan: The Story of Hassan of Bagdad and How He Came to Make the Golden Journey to Samarkand, and Ludwig Minkus's ballet Don Quixote.

=== Later history ===
Stories remain that despite the engineering innovations used by Gorgolewski to construct the foundation of the building, it began to slowly sink because of the Poltva river running underneath it in a tunnel. In July 1903 he died suddenly of paralysis of the aorta. After some initial settling, the building ceased 'sinking' and remains stable to this day, owing to the innovative design of Gorgolewski.

In April 1990, immediately prior to the fall of the Soviet Union, the first performance of the Ukraine's national anthem, Shche ne vmerla Ukrainy i slava, i volia, was held at the theatre.

== Architectural style ==
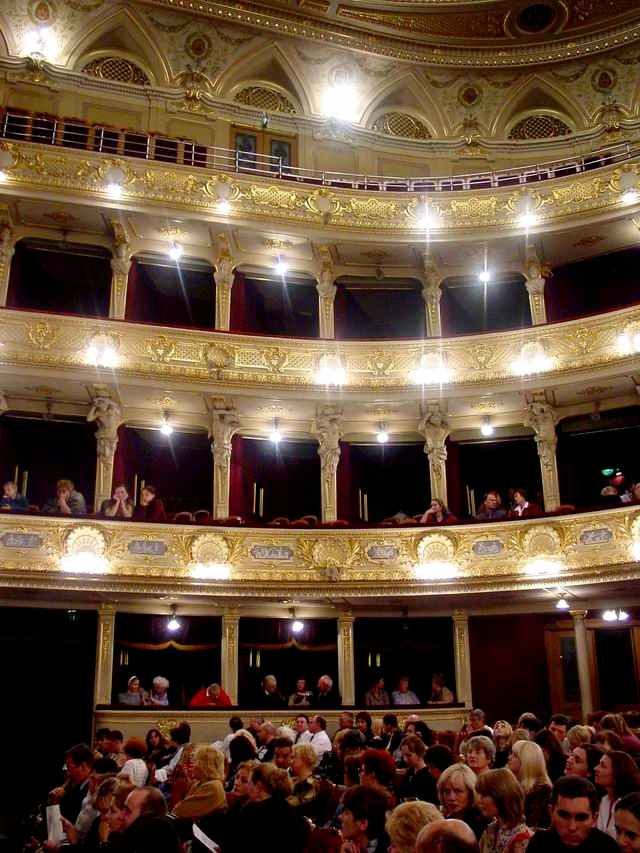
Lviv Opera, a view of the balconies from the floor

The Lviv Theatre of Opera and Ballet is built in the classical tradition using forms and details of Renaissance Revival and Neo-Baroque architectural styles. There are also elements of Art Nouveau. The stucco mouldings and oil paintings on the walls and ceilings of the multi-tiered auditorium and foyer give it a richly festive appearance. The building's façade is decorated with numerous niches, Corinthian columns, pilasters, balustrades, cornices, statues, reliefs and stucco garlands. Standing in niches on either side of the main entrance are allegorical figures representing Comedy and Tragedy sculpted by Antoni Popiel and Tadeusz Barącz; figures of muses embellish the top of the cornice. The building is crowned by large bronze statues, symbolizing Glory, Poetry and Music.

The theatre became a centrefold of the achievements in sculpture and painting of Western Europe at the end of the 19th century. The internal decoration was prepared by some of the most renowned Polish artists of the time. Among them were Stanisław Wójcik (allegorical sculptures of Poetry, Music, Fame, Fortune, Comedy and Tragedy), Julian Markowski, Tadeusz Wiśniowiecki, Tadeusz Barącz, Piotr Wojtowicz (relief depicting the coat of arms of Lviv), Juliusz Bełtowski (bas-relief of Gorgolewski) and Antoni Popiel (sculptures of Muses decorating the façade).

Among the painters to decorate the interior were Tadeusz Popiel (staircases), Stanisław Rejchan (main hall), Stanisław Dębicki, Stanisław Kaczor-Batowski and Marceli Harasimowicz (foyer). The team supervised by these artists included the painters Aleksander Augustynowicz, Ludwik Kohler, Walery Kryciński, Henryk Kuhn, Edward Pietsch, Zygmunt Rozwadowski, Tadeusz Rybkowski and Julian Zuber. The main curtain was decorated by the Polish painter Henryk Siemiradzki.

== Gallery ==
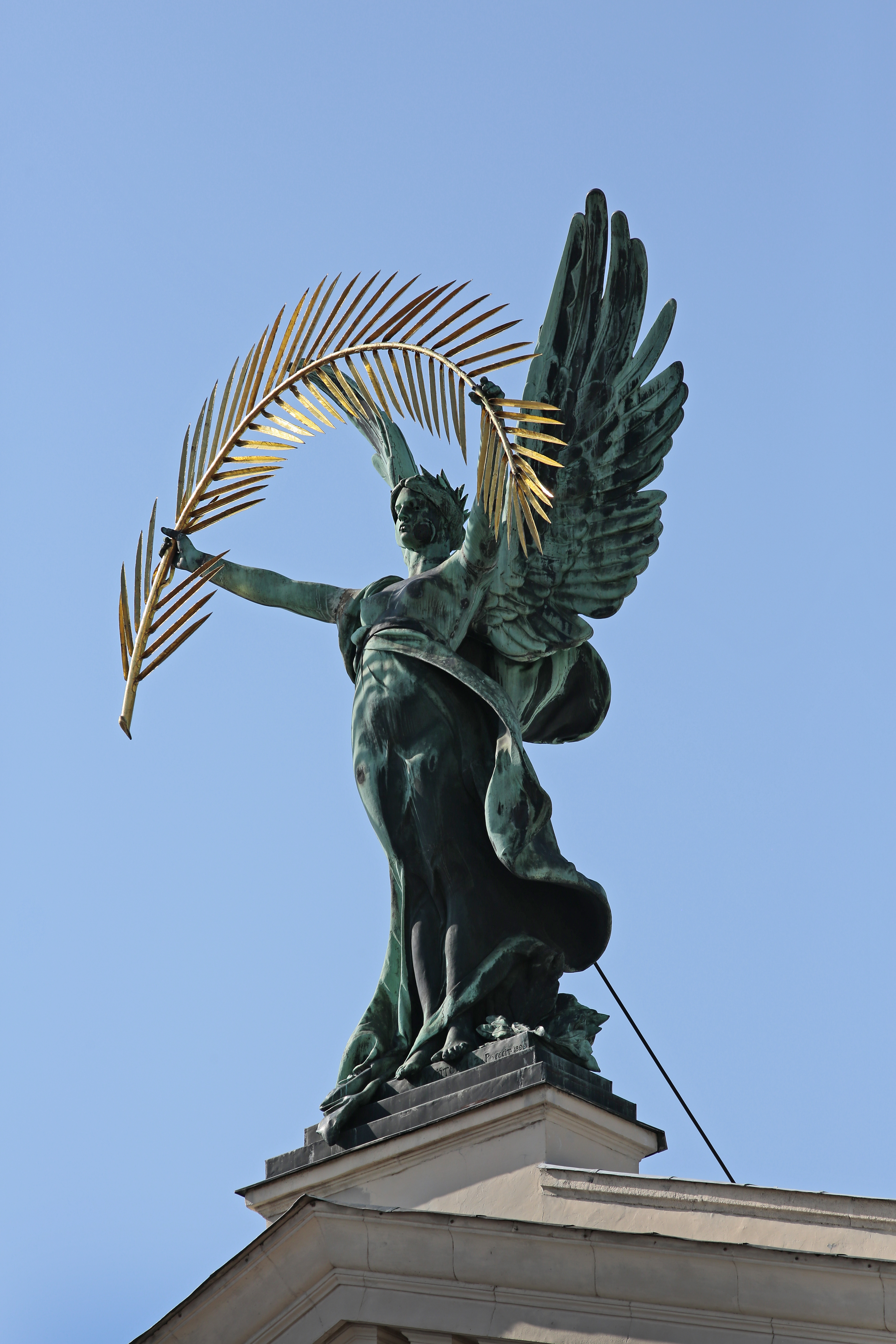
Decorative sculpture on the roof

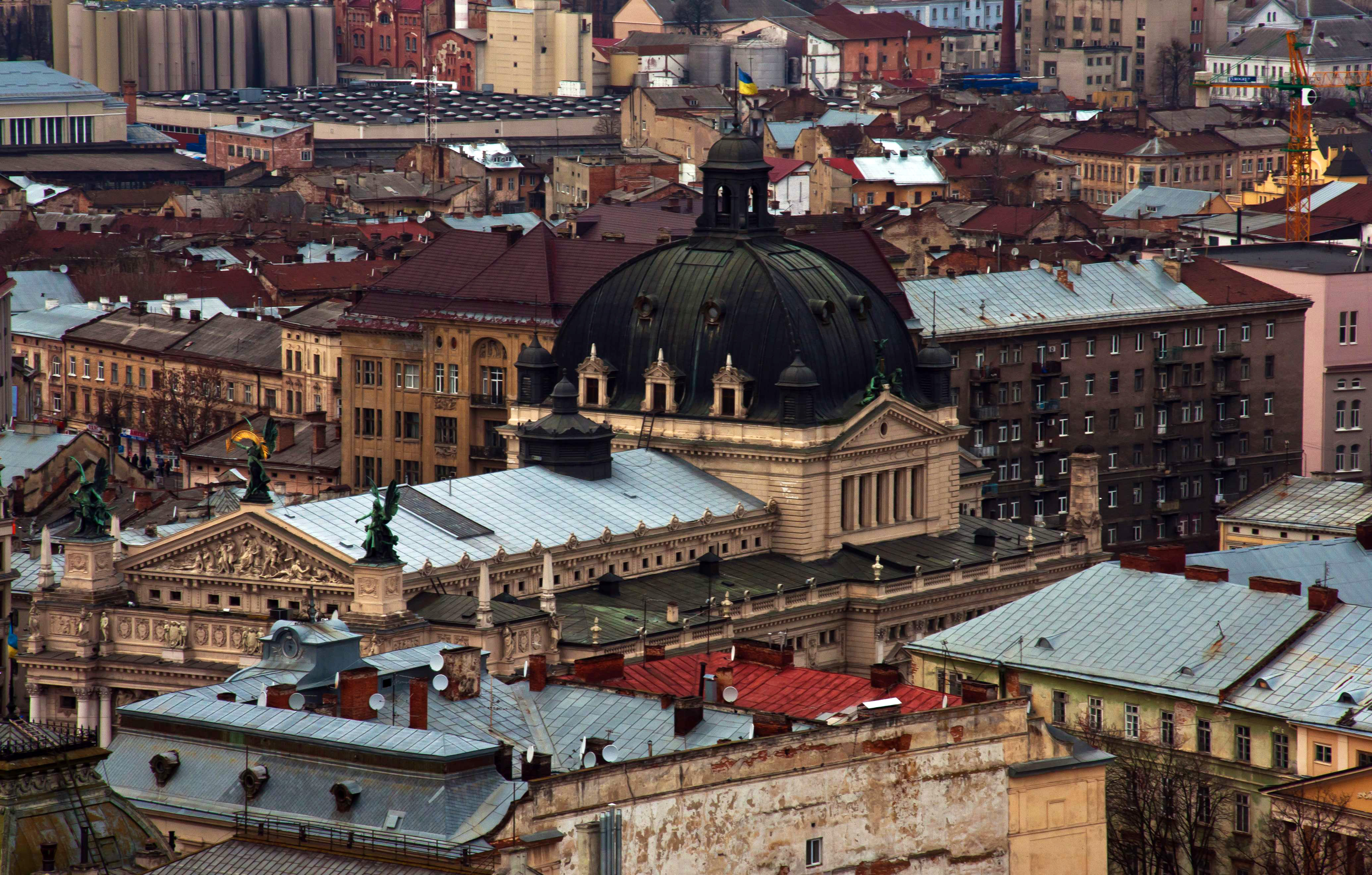
View from the top of Lviv Town Hall

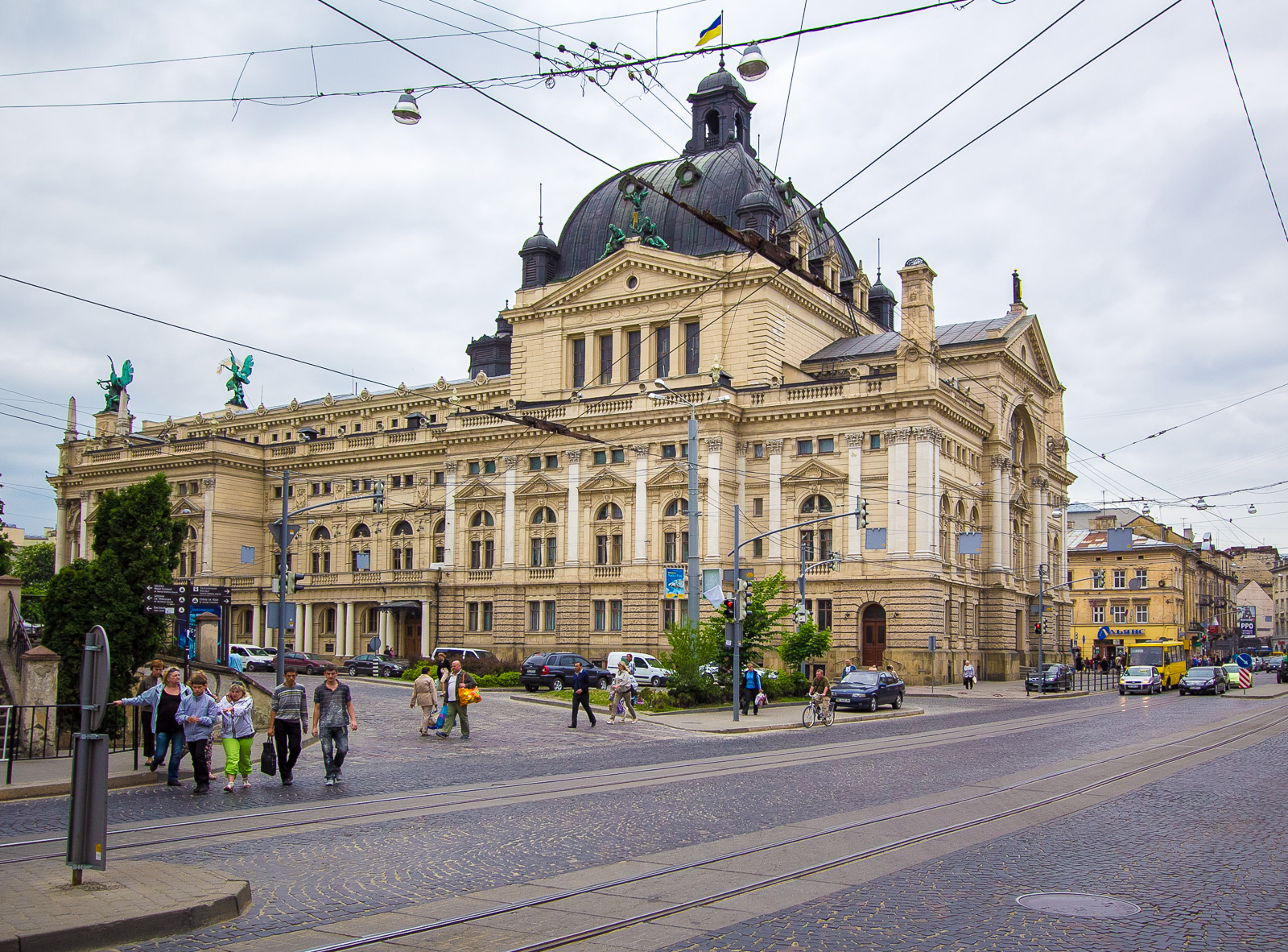
Side view

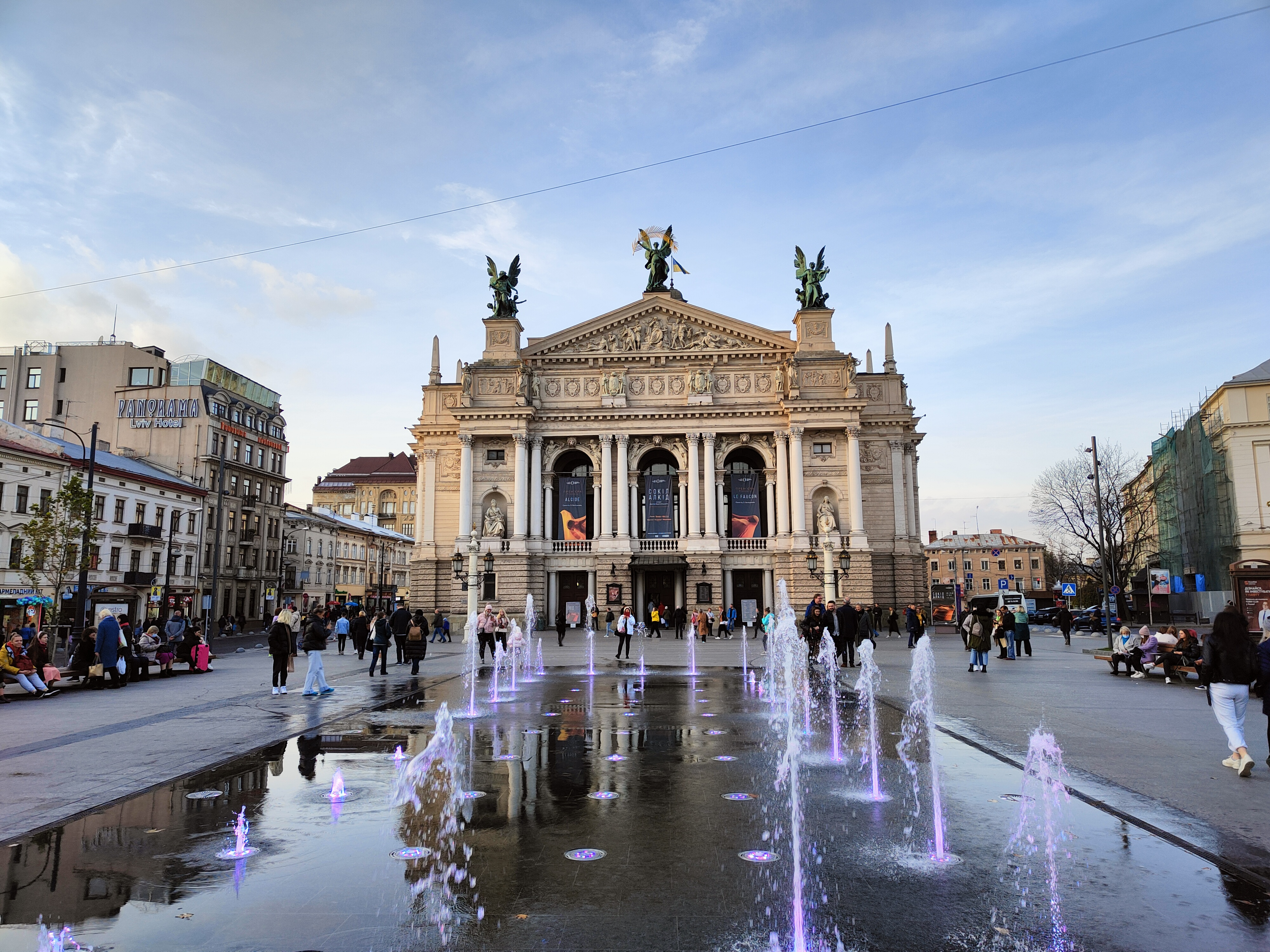
Fountain in front of the Opera

== See also ==
- List of opera houses
