= Oberson =

Oberson is a surname. Notable people with the surname include:

- Swann Oberson (born 1986), Swiss long-distance swimmer
- Xavier Oberson (born 1961), Swiss academic

== See also ==
- Berson
- Roberson (surname)
