= Freedom Avenue, Lviv =

Main avenue of Lviv, Ukraine

Prospekt Svobody Проспект Свободи
- Pedestrian alley in Freedom Avenue with Lviv Opera in the background
- Interactive map of Prospekt Svobody; Проспект Свободи
- Former names: Wały Hetmańskie (19th century); Karl-Ludwig-Straße (before 1918); Legionów/Hetmańska (1918-1938); Wały prez. Mościckiego (1938-1939); 1 Травня (1939-1941, 1944-1959); Hitlerring/Museumstraße/ Theaterstraße (1941-1944) просп. Леніна (1959-1991)
- Length: 0.575 km (0.357 mi)
- Location: Lviv, Ukraine
- Coordinates: 49°50′34″N 24°01′34″E
- From: Mickiewicz Square
- To: Lviv Opera

Freedom Avenue (Ukrainian: Проспект Свободи, romanized: Prospekt Svobody) is the central thoroughfare of Lviv, Ukraine. It runs from the Mickiewicz Square in the south towards Lviv Opera in the north. The street emerged under Austrian rule on the site of Polish-era fortifications to the west of the Old Town.

== Names ==
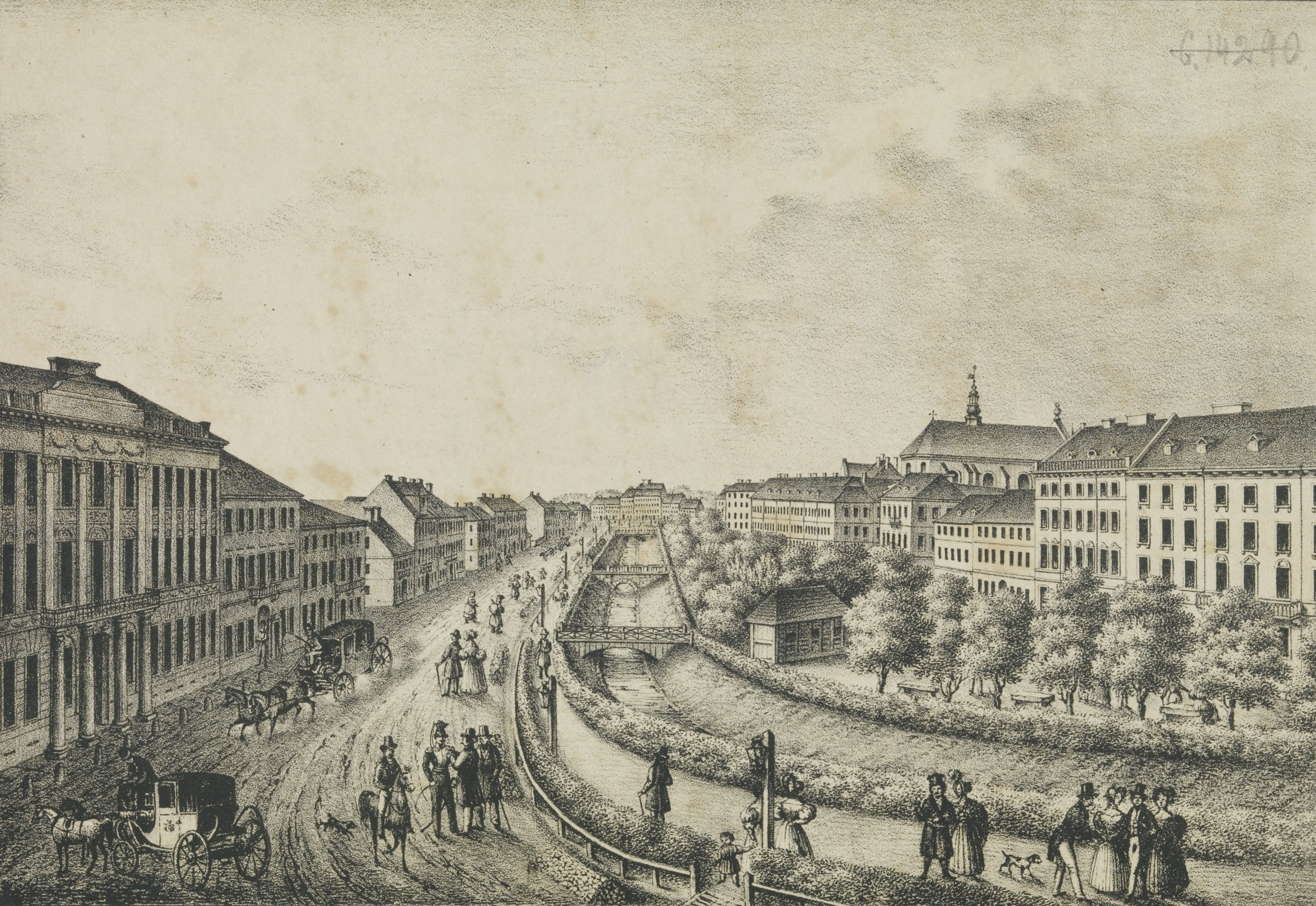
View of Hetman's Walls around 1840

Initially, the avenue was known as Hetman's Walls (Polish: Wały Hetmańskie, Ukrainian: Гетьманські вали), in honour of hetman Stanisław Jabłonowski, who organized the defence of Lviv from Tatars in 1695. Under Austrian rule, the avenue was renamed into Karl Ludwig Street (German: Karl-Ludwig-Straße), and in the Second Polish Republic became known as the Legions Street (Polish: ulica Legionów, western part) and Hetman's Street (Polish: ulica Hetmańska, eastern part). In 1938 city authorities decided to rename the avenue in honour of Polish president Ignacy Mościcki. During the German occupation the avenue was once again divided, with the section in front of the Opera Theatre becoming known as Hitlerring, eastern half of the avenue as Museum Street, and western part as Theatre Street. Under the Soviet rule it was initially renamed into 1st of May Street, and later became known as Lenin Avenue.

== History ==
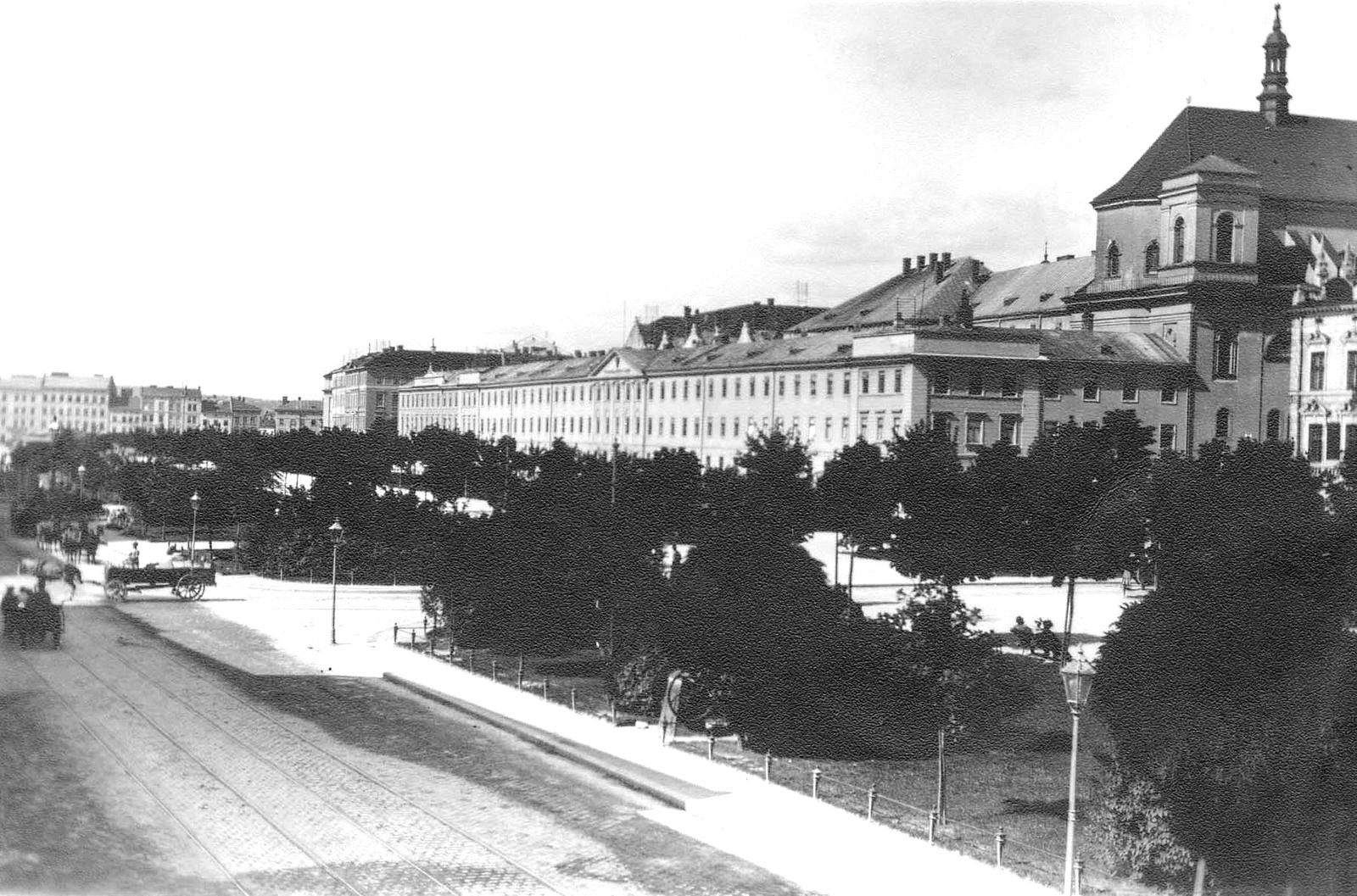
Hetman's Walls in 1880

The avenue emerged after 1777, following the Austrian annexation of Lviv, on the site of earlier fortifications along the Poltva river. Initially, it comprised a green boulevard divided by the course of Poltva in the middle. During the second half of the 19th century, the river was gradually enclosed into an underground canal, which still exists under the street and nearby Shevchenko Avenue. Under Austrian rule, the area served as a traditional site of stock trading. By the end of the 19th century an electric tram line was launched along the avenue.

Aerial photo from 1931 with Lviv Opera visible

Euromaidan protests in Freedom Avenue, November 2013

During the Great Depression, on 16 April 1936 the avenue was a site of clashes between a procession of unemployed workers and Polish police, which resulted in at least 3 fatalities and numerous wounded.

In 1959 the avenue was renamed after Lenin, preserving that name until the inauguration of the first democratically elected Lviv Oblast Council in 1990. During the Soviet period, it served as a site of annual International Workers' Day demonstrations.

During the late 1980s, the avenue became a site of numerous public meetings and demonstrations, as well as singing concerts. On 20 September 1987, a group of around 30 youths marched along the avenue chanting slogans in support of nuclear disarmament, freedom of speech and political reform. As a result, several participants of the march were expelled from educational establishments by authorities. That event was described by BBC, Radio Liberty and Voice of America as Soviet Ukraine's first political demonstration. On 12 March 1989, the biggest protest march to be organized in Lviv under Soviet rule took place in the street, with 30,000 people protesting against exclusion of non-Communist candidates from the election to the Congress of People's Deputies of the Soviet Union. The demonstration was forcibly dispersed by militsiya and OMON troops, resulting in 40 arrests. On 1 May 1989 an International Workers' Day demonstration was for the first time organized in the avenue under Ukrainian national banners. On 17 September 1989, a column counting up to 300,000 people marched along the avenue, demanding the legalization of Ukrainian Greek Catholic Church.

Following Ukraine's independence, the street was renamed into Freedom Avenue. During the Euromaidan, the avenue was the site of mass demonstrations by students supporting Ukraine's European integration.

== Notable buildings ==
- Grand Hotel (No.13)
- Museum of Ethnography (No.15)
- Andrey Sheptytsky National Museum of Lviv (No.20)
- Maria Zankovetska Theatre (No.26)
- Lviv Opera (No.28)

== Monuments ==
Jan Sobieski monument during the early 20th century

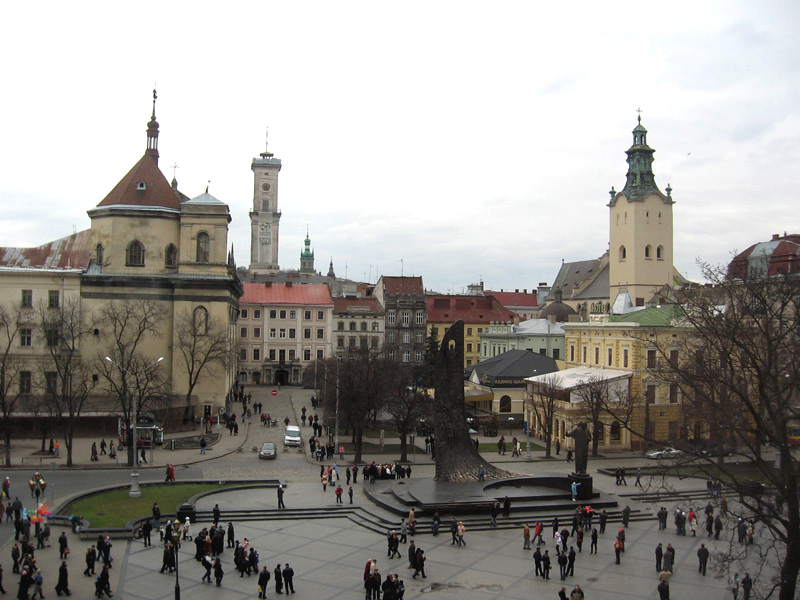
Taras Shevchenko monument and view on the Old Town

During the mid-19th century, a statue of hetman Stanisław Jabłonowski was erected in front of modern-day National Museum. During the 1930s, the sculpture was removed and transferred to the square in front of the Jesuit Church, before disappearing during the Soviet occupation in 1944.

During the second half of the 19th century a sculpture of Michael the Archangel was moved to the avenue from the Royal Arsenal. In 1873, the statue's gilded wings were stolen by local criminals (batiars), and by the end of the century it was removed. Today the sculpture is kept in Lviv Arsenal museum.

In 1898 a monument to king Jan Sobieski produced by local sculptor Tadej Barącz was erected in the avenue. In 1950 the statue was taken to Warsaw, and in 1965 moved to Gdańsk, where it stands to this day.

After the erection of the monument to Adam Mickiewicz in 1904, the marble statue of Virgin Mary was moved from modern-day Mickiewicz Square and placed at the southern end of the modern avenue. In 1950 the sculpture was removed and replaced with a fountain. In 1997 a copy of the original statue was installed on the site.

After the Soviet occupation in 1939, a monument to Stalin's Constitution, also known as "Monument to the Friendship of Peoples", was erected in the avenue, adorned with inscriptions in Polish, Ukrainian and Yiddish languages. The statue was demolished after the arrival of German troops in June 1941.

Following the reestablishment of Soviet regime, on 20 January 1952 a monument to Vladimir Lenin was unveiled in front of the Industrial Museum building (now Sheptytsky National Museum). In August 1990 the monument was removed on the order of regional authorities. Following the statue's demolition, gravestones of Sich Riflemen, which had been taken from Yaniv Cemetery, were discovered in its base.

Following Ukraine's independence, a monument to Taras Shevchenko was erected in the avenue.

== Gallery ==
National Museum

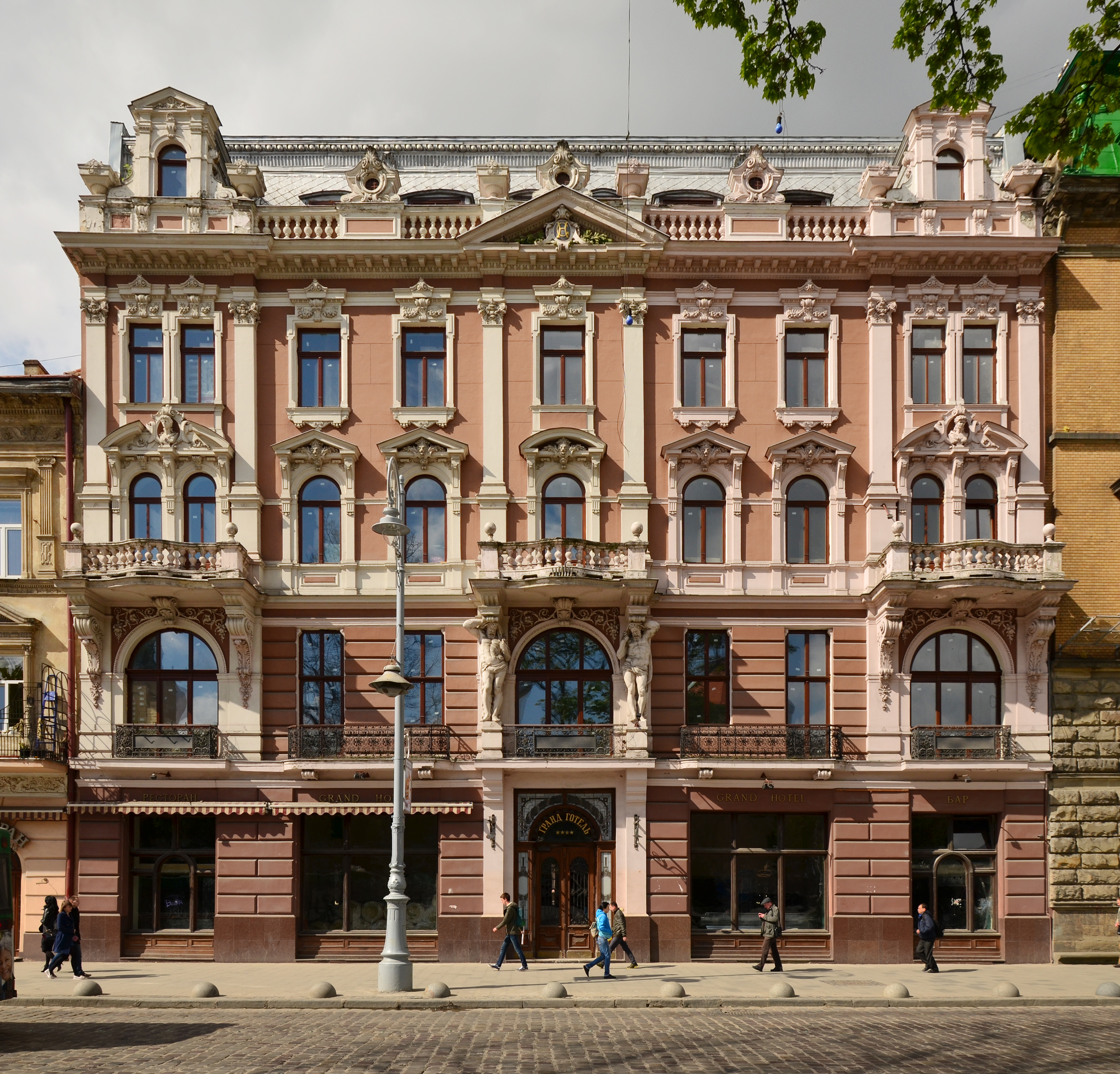
Grand Hotel

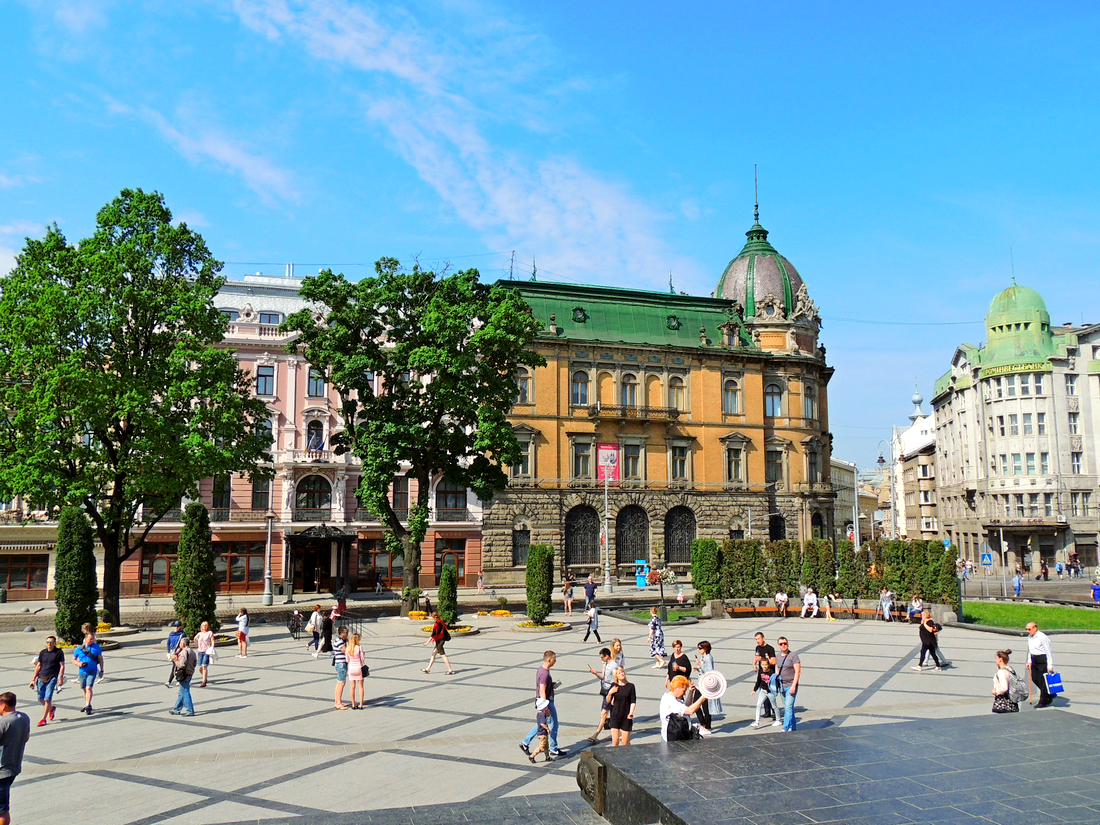
Administrative buildings in the avenue

A pedestrian area in Freedom Avenue

View on the northern end of the avenue from Lviv Town Hall
