= Berzon =

Berzon is a surname. Notable people with the surname include:

- Alexandra Berzon (born 1979), American reporter
- Betty Berzon (1928–2006), American author and psychotherapist
- Marsha Berzon (born 1945), American judge

== See also ==
- Berson
