= Zygmunt Gorgolewski =

Polish architect

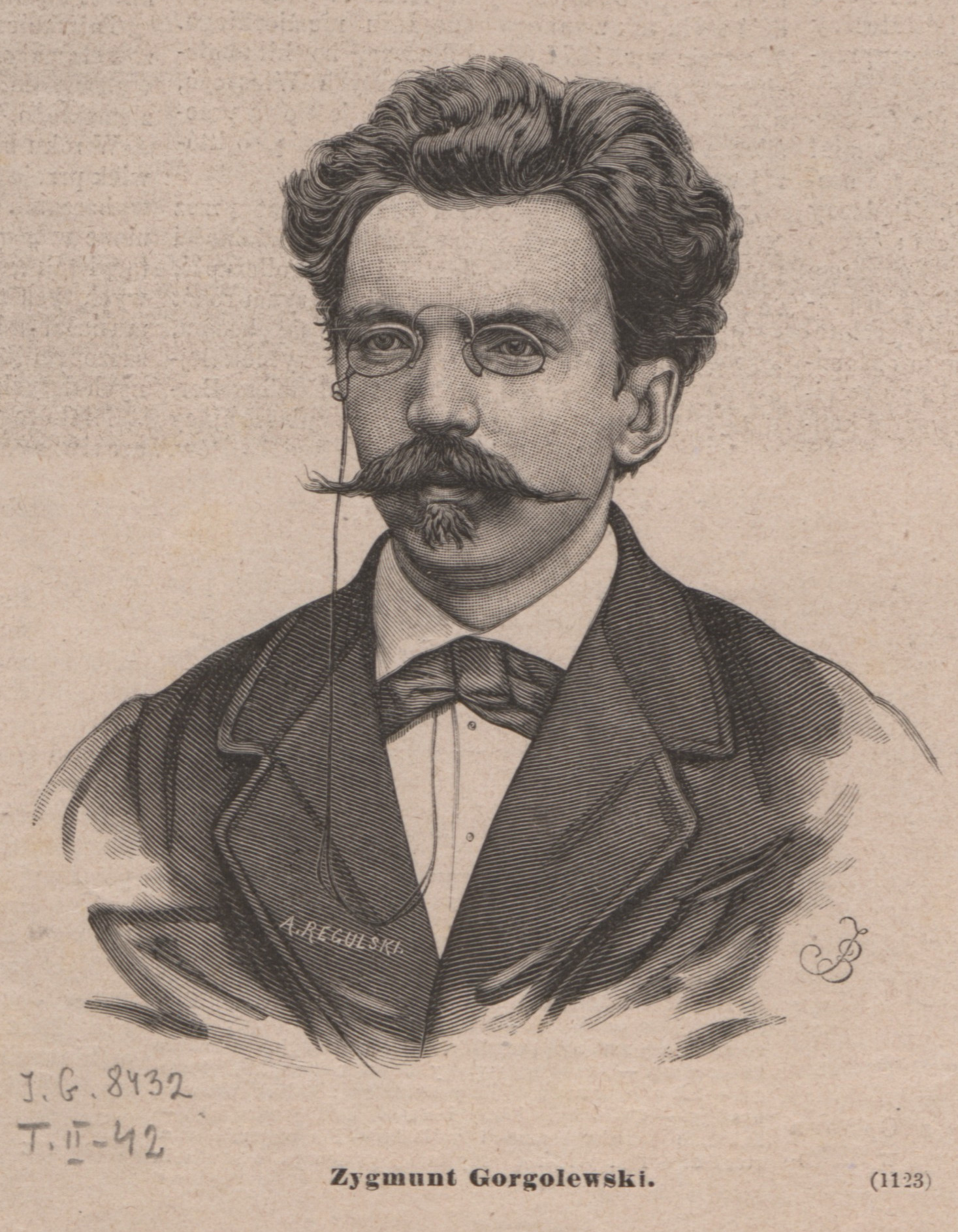
- Born: 14 February 1845
- Died: 6 July 1903 (aged 58)
- Education: Royal Building Academy
- Occupation: architect
- Buildings: Lviv Theatre of Opera and Ballet

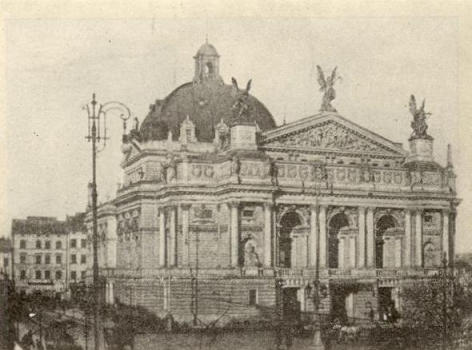
Grand Theatre in Lviv

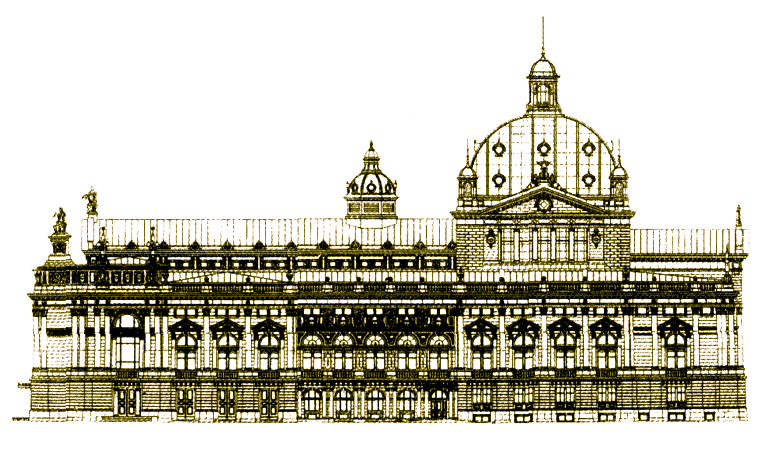
Side view of the original project

Zygmunt Gorgolewski (14 February 1845 in Solec – 6 July 1903 in Lviv) was a Polish architect, renowned for his construction of the Grand Theatre in Lviv.

== Life and career ==
Gorgolewski was born in Solec (Schulitz), Grand Duchy of Posen, Kingdom of Prussia. Between 1866 and 1871 he studied in Berlin at the Royal Building Academy. During his studies, Gorgolewski also supervised the construction of Lehrte Train Station in Berlin. After graduating, for six years he worked as an assistant in his alma mater. After that he became an advisor at the Prussian Ministry of Public Works, official royal palace architect and architecture inspector (Königlicher Regierungsbaumeister) in Halle upon Saale. Gorgolewski was one of the most notable supporters of historicism in architecture in the Kingdom of Prussia and then the German Empire.

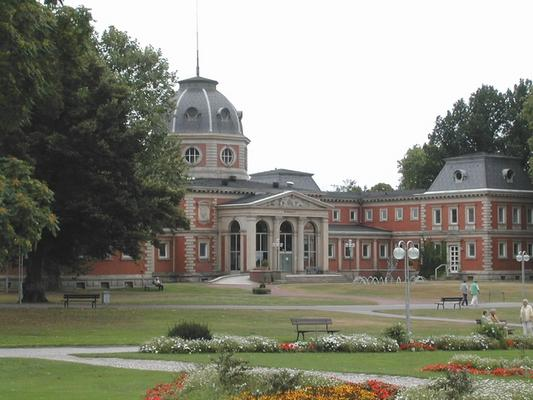
Bad Oeynhausen: Bathhouse IV (now II), 1883-1885 by Zygmunt Gorgolewski

Among his projects were two versions of the future Reichstag building, which he proposed in 1872 and then in 1882. His projects were among merely 20 chosen by the committee out of more than 100. However, in the end his ideas for these projects were refused. At the same time, Gorgolewski was awarded with the construction of Kaiser Wilhelm's Bridge. Other, more successful, projects include the plans of refurbishment of royal palaces in Berlin and in Kiel, expansion of University Hospitals in Halle upon Saale and Bonn, the Bathhouse IV (1883-1885, now numbered II) of Bad Oeynhausen spa in Westphalia. In addition, he contributed plans for the projected new construction of the Berlin Supreme Parish and Collegiate Church, and worked on renovating Bellevue Palace, and created as main architect courthouses in Opole (Oppeln) and Olsztyn (Allenstein), as well as prisons in Świdnica (Schweidnitz) and Chorzów (Königshütte).

In the Greater Poland region, Gorgolewski conducted the construction of many notable palaces both in and around Poznań. His works include:

- refurbishment of a church in Września
- refurbishment of Działyński family palace in Gołuchów
- refurbishment of Działyński family library in Kórnik
- construction of Twardowski family palace in Kobylniki
- enlargement of Kwilecki palace in Oporów
- Radziwiłł family romantic castle Bagatela near Ostrów Wielkopolski
- construction of a new church tower as well as a Czapski family chapel in Smogulec
- construction of the headquarters of the Poznań Society of Friends of Arts and Sciences (1874–79), as well as houses in Berlińska street in front of it.

He was also appointed as the main architect of the refurbishment of Olyka Castle owned by Ferdynand Radziwiłł in Ołyka, Volhynia. During his stay there, Gorgolewski for the first time visited Vilnius, Kraków, Kyiv and Lviv. The latter city enjoyed a period of fast expansion and in 1875 Gorgolewski took part in the contest for the project of the future Diet of Galicia and Lodomeria. His project was the most disputed and highly praised, but it was finally turned down, mostly due to financial reasons.

In 1879, Gorgolewski married Helena née Hulewicz. He was also an active member of many architectural juries across partitioned Poland. Among others, he was the member of the jury during the contest for the project of Kraków Old Theatre (1889), the bank in Czerniowce and Church of St. Elizabeth in Lviv. In 1893 he moved to Lviv, where he was chosen as the main architect of the Grand Theatre (1897–1900). To avoid being accused of using his well-established position in society, Gorgolewski prepared his winning project of the theatre in secret and then sent it under a false name from Leipzig. Other notable building of his authorship was the Industrial School in the same city. In 1894, he was a member of a team of architects supervising the construction of over 100 pavilions for the General National Exhibition in Lviv.

Gorgolewski died in Lviv and was buried in the Lychakiv Cemetery.

== Gallery ==
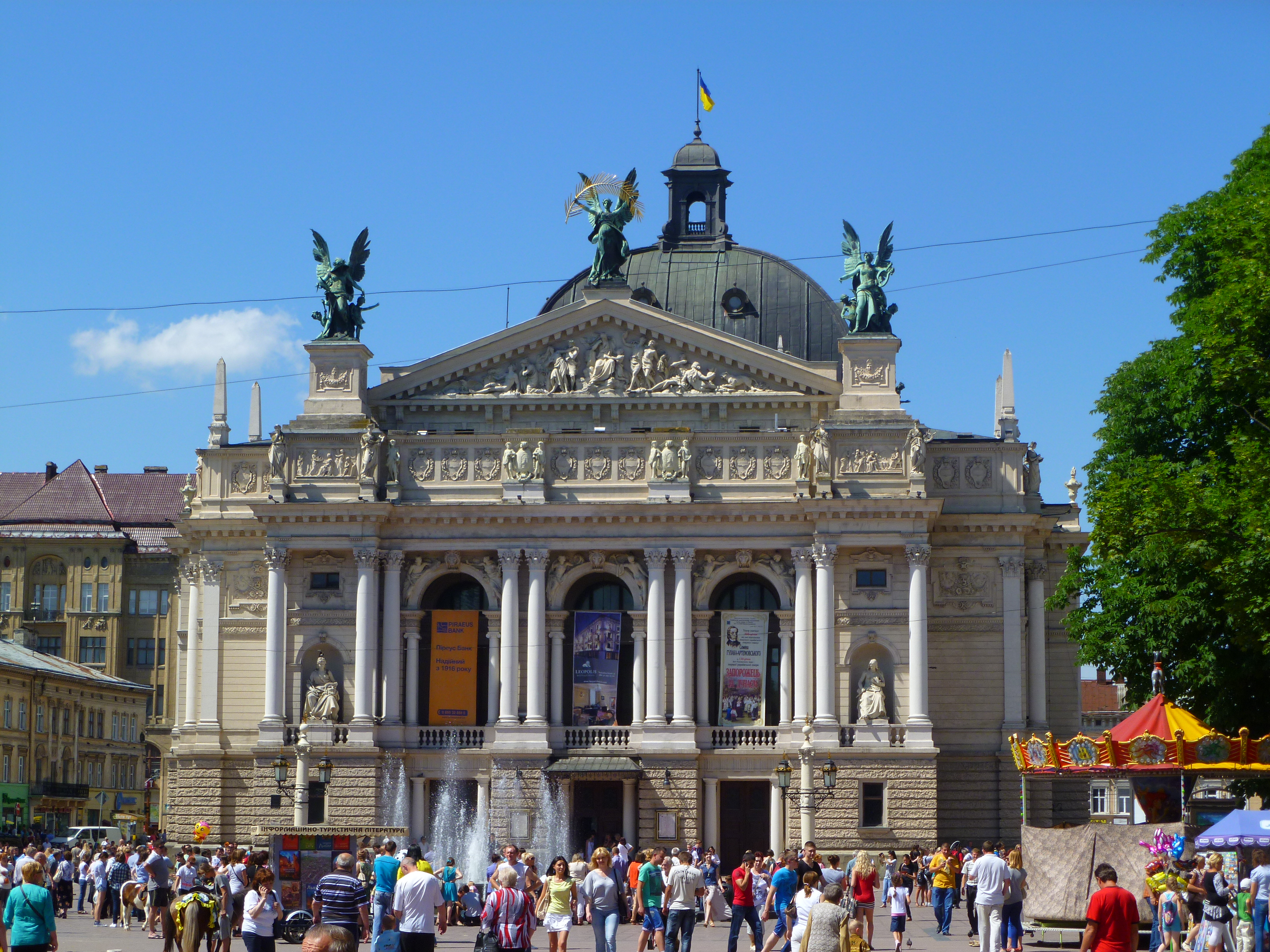
Lviv Theatre of Opera and Ballet

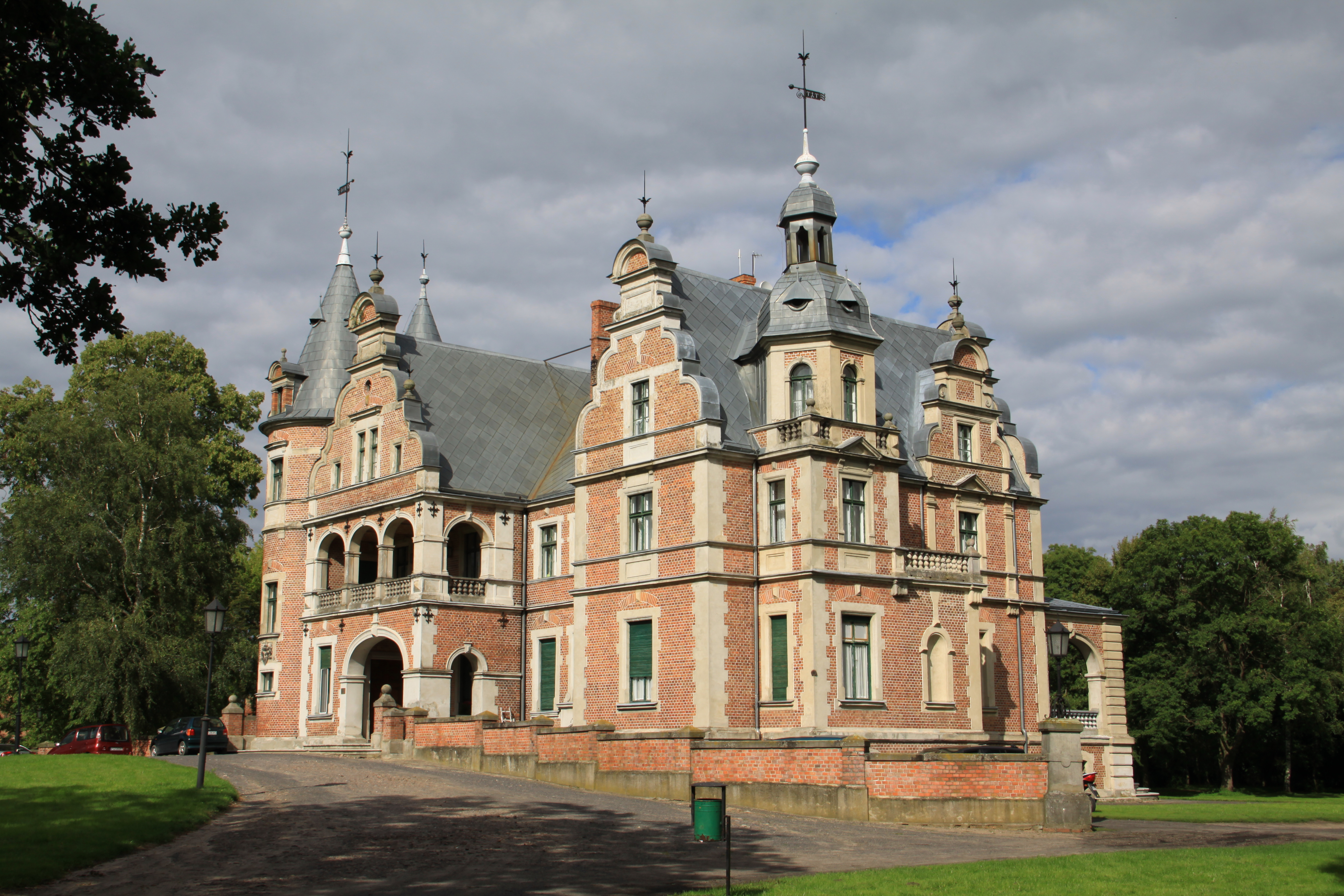
Kobylniki Palace

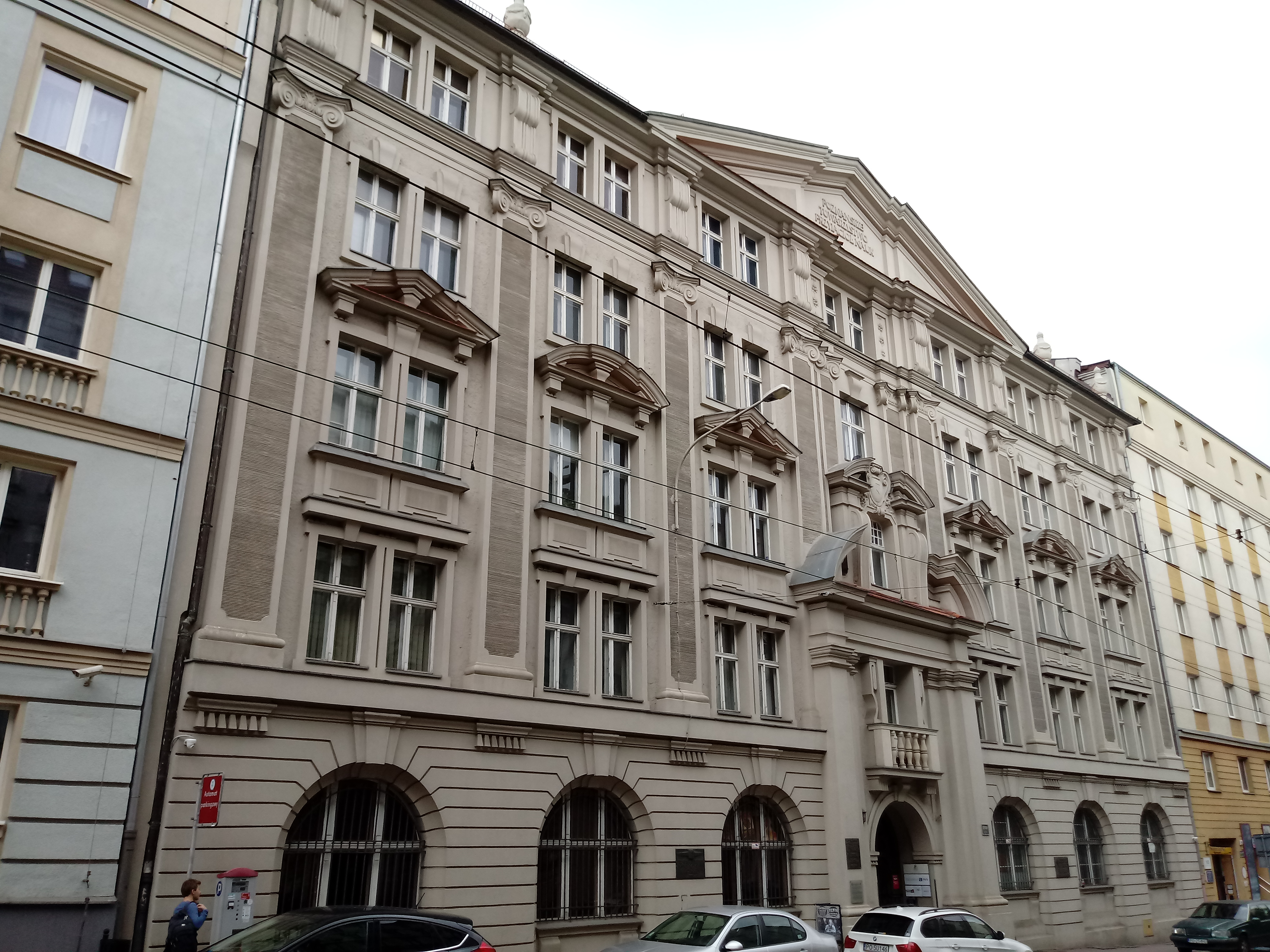
Seat of the Poznań Society of Friends of Arts and Sciences

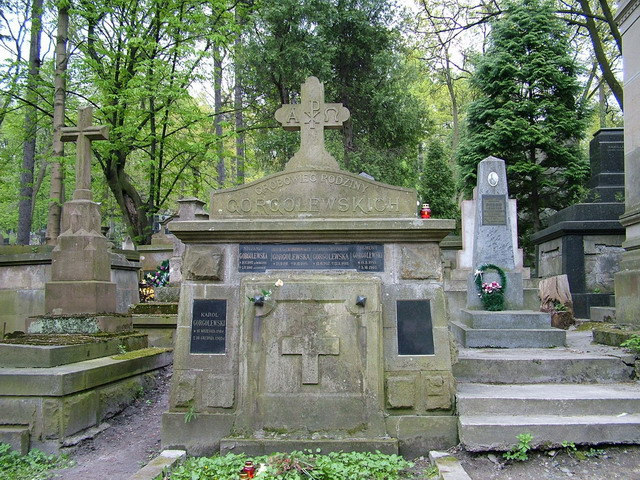
Tomb of the Gorgolewski family in Lviv

== See also ==
- History of Lviv
- Teodor Talowski
