= Poltva =

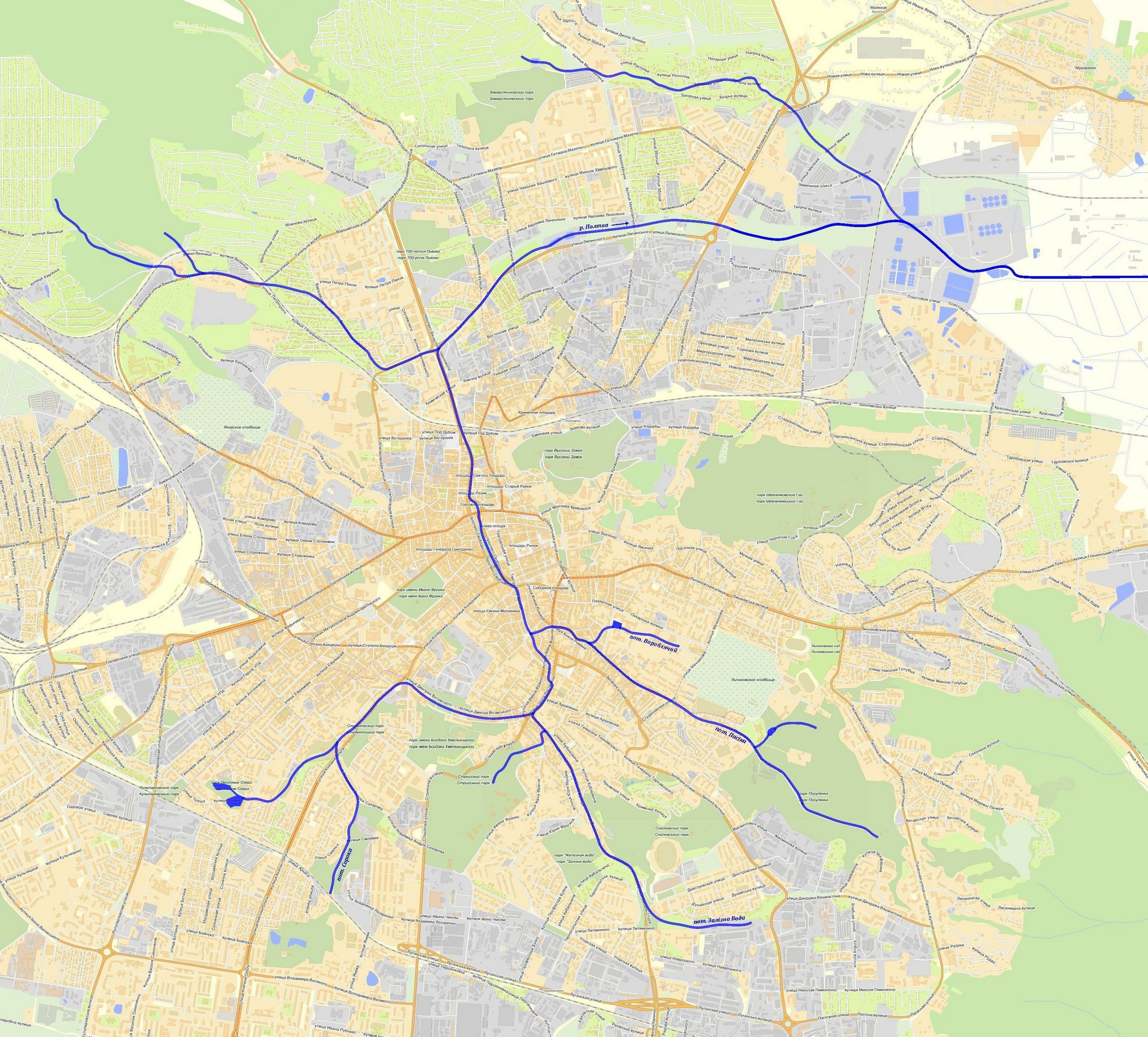
- The course of River Poltva within Lviv

Location
- Country: Ukraine

Physical characteristics
- Source
  - location: Lviv, Ukraine
- Mouth: Bug
  - location: Busk
  - coordinates: 49.9603°N 24.6077°E
- Length: 60 km (37 mi)
- Basin size: 1,440 km^{2} (560 sq mi)

Basin features
- Progression: Bug→ Narew→ Vistula→ Baltic Sea

The Poltva (Ukrainian: Полтва; Polish: Pełtew) is a river in the western Ukrainian Oblast of Lviv and a tributary of the Bug. The Poltva valley cuts between the Podilian Plateau and Roztichia. The capital of the Lviv Oblast, Lviv, is located on the river, with the river flowing directly beneath Lviv's central street, Liberty Avenue, and the Lviv Theatre of Opera and Ballet.

The river once faced significant problems with pollution. As a result, the river was covered up and included into the underground sewer system of Lviv, beginning in 1839. During World War 2, Jews fleeing Nazi violence used the underground river as a hiding place.
