= Kobylniki, Szamotuły County =

Kobylniki
- Village
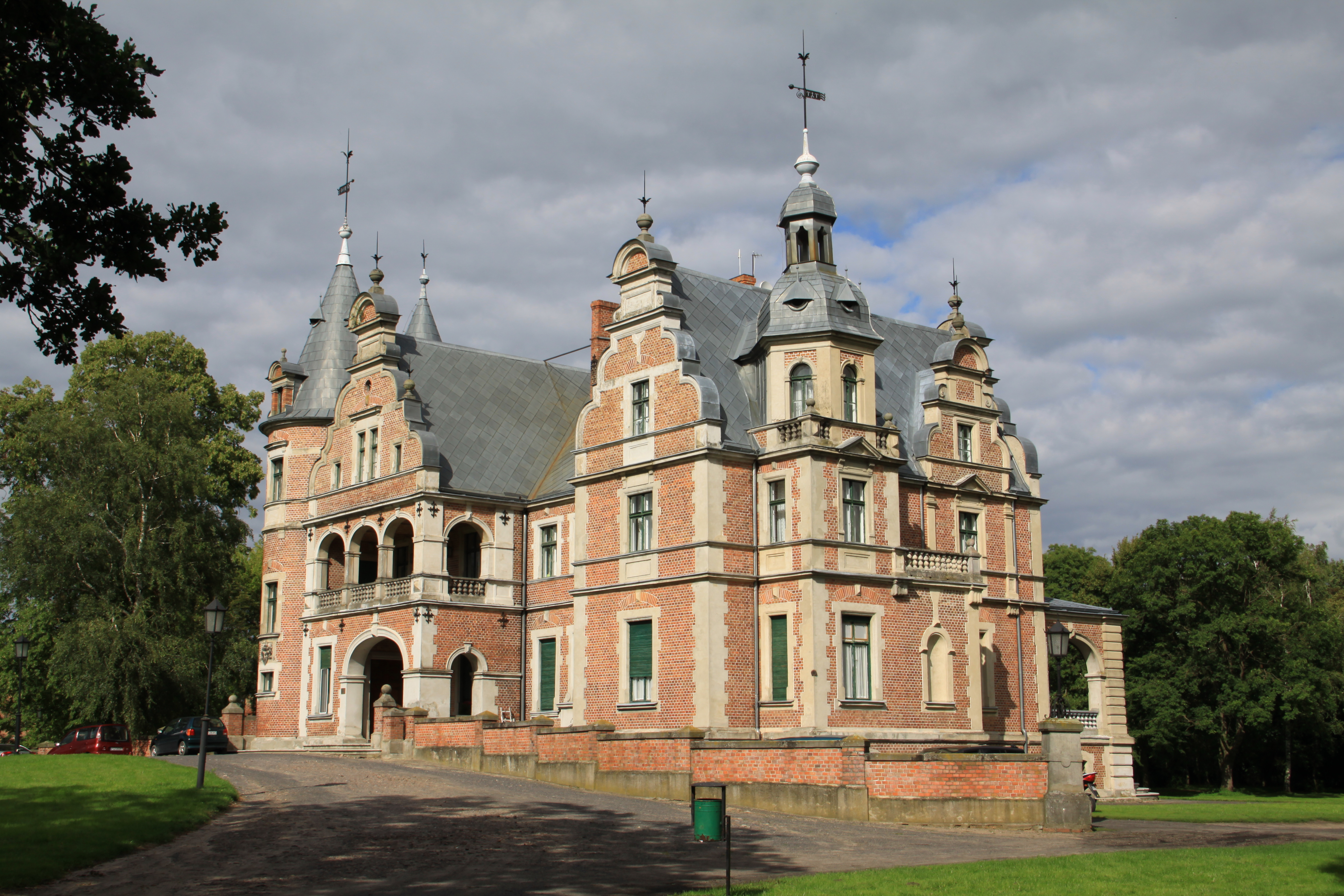
- Twardowski Palace in Kobylniki

- Location within Poland
- Coordinates: 52°40′N 16°33′E
- Country: Poland
- Voivodeship: Greater Poland
- County: Szamotuły
- Gmina: Obrzycko
- Time zone: UTC+1 (CET)
  - Summer (DST): UTC+2 (CEST)
- Vehicle registration: PSZ

Kobylniki [kɔbɨlˈniki] is a village in the administrative district of Gmina Obrzycko, within Szamotuły County, Greater Poland Voivodeship, in west-central Poland.

The landmark of Kobylniki is the Neo-Renaissance Kobylniki Palace, designed by Zygmunt Gorgolewski and built for the Twardowski family.

== History ==
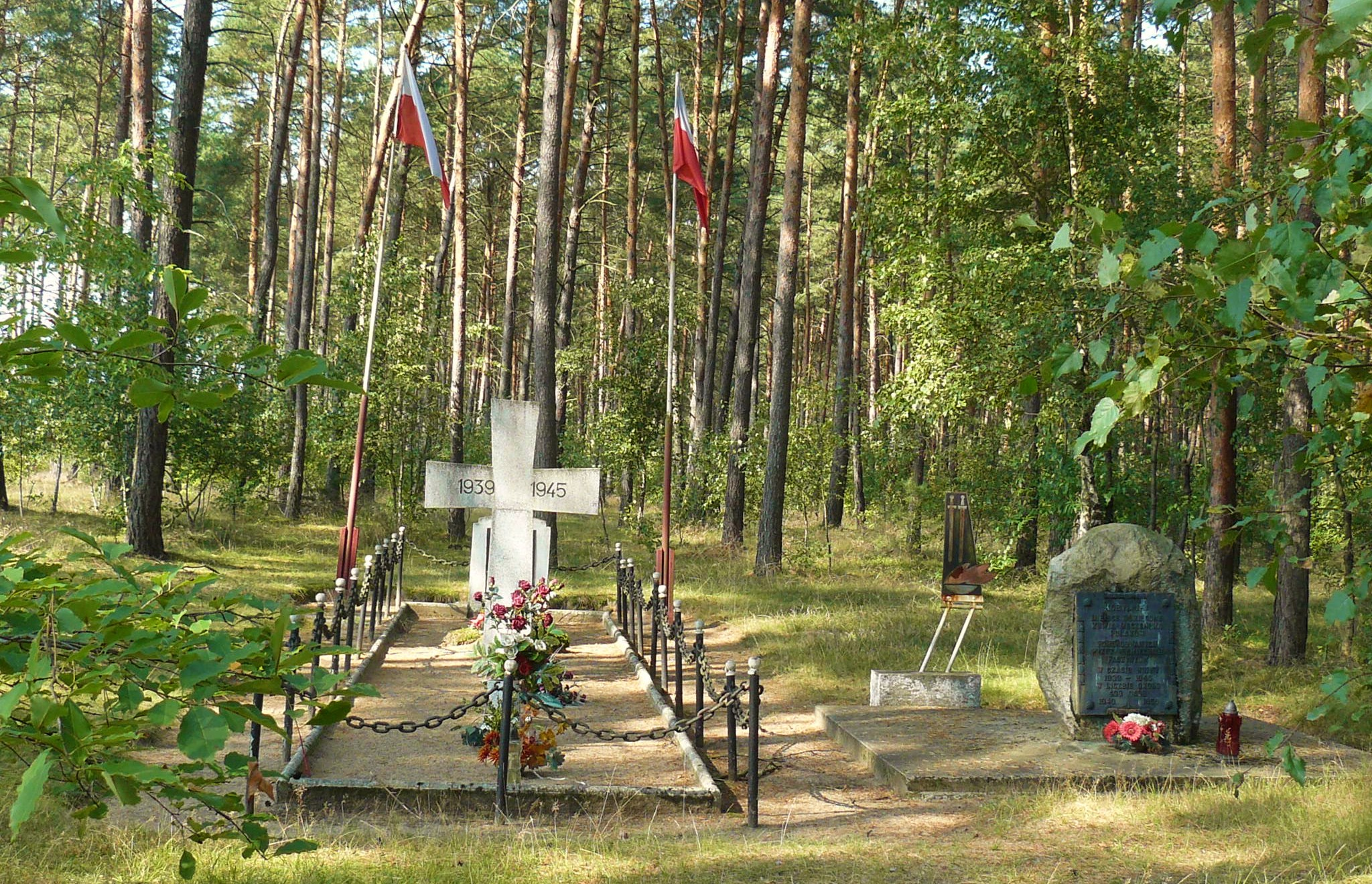
Memorial at the site of massacres of Poles carried out by the Germans throughout World War II

Kobylniki was mentioned in 1218 as a possession of the Cistercian monastery Łekno, and later it was a private village of Polish nobility, administratively located in the Poznań County in the Poznań Voivodeship in the Greater Poland Province of the Kingdom of Poland.

During the German occupation of Poland (World War II), the forest of Kobylniki was the site of large massacres of Poles from nearby towns and villages, carried out by the Germans. There is a memorial at the site. During the Intelligenzaktion, Poles from Kobylniki were also murdered in Kościan and the Mauthausen concentration camp.
