= Aleksander Augustynowicz =

Polish painter (1865–1944)

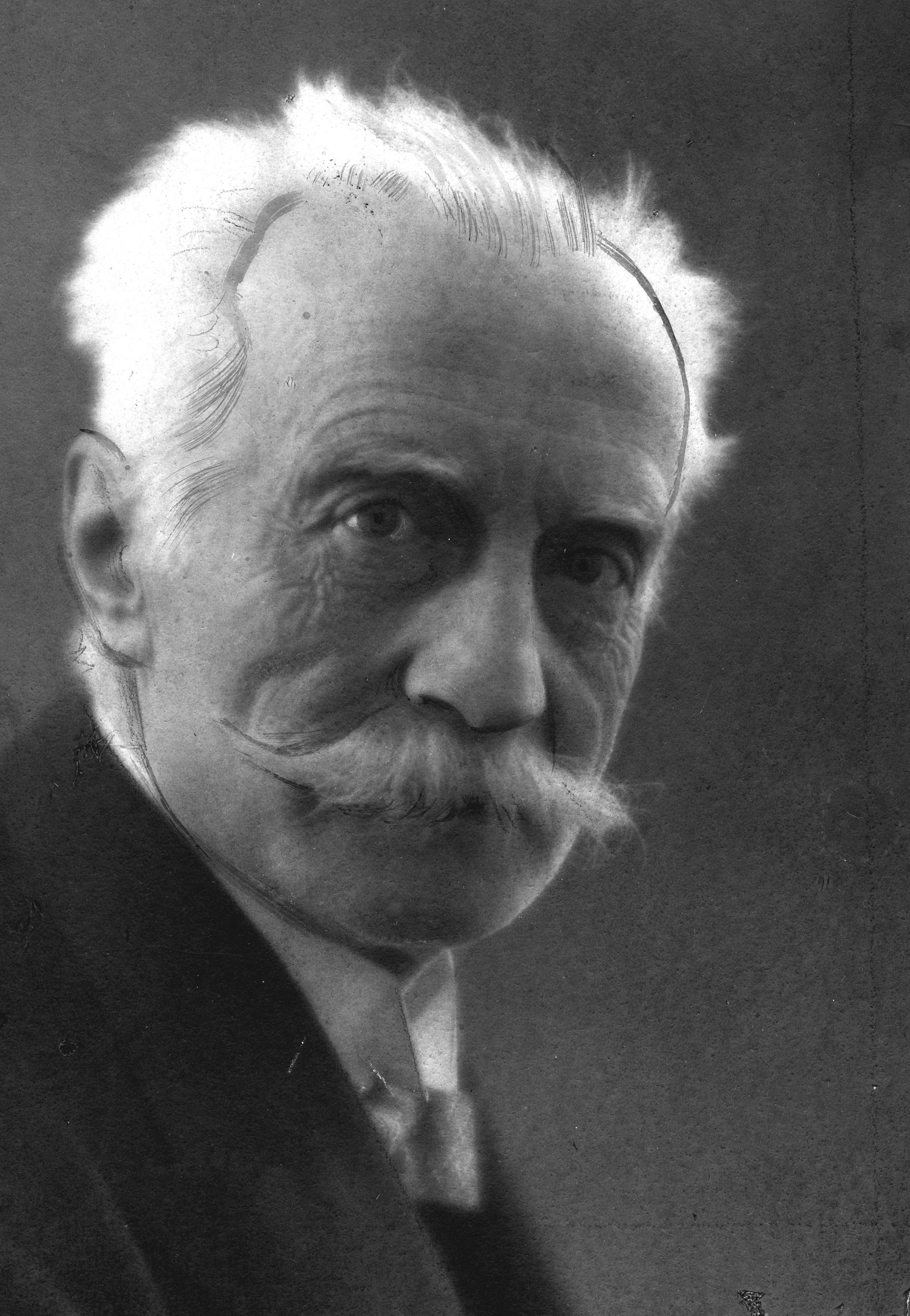
- Augustynowicz in 1939
- Born: Aleksander Augustynowicz; 7 February 1865; Iskrzynia, Austrian Empire
- Died: 23 August 1944 (aged 79); Warsaw, Nazi Germany
- Education: Jan Matejko Academy of Fine Arts
- Known for: Painting
- Spouse: Anna Czemeryńska (1895)
- Awards

Aleksander Augustynowicz (February 7, 1865 – August 23, 1944) was a Polish painter active in Poland.

== Biography ==
Aleksander Augustynowicz was born in Iskrzynia. His father, Wincenty, was a landlord and his mother, Julia, was from the House of Habecki. Augustynowicz completed his secondary education in Rzeszów, in the following years of 1883 to 1886 he studied at the Jan Matejko Academy of Fine Arts in Kraków, where he was led by Feliks Szynalewski, Władysław Łuszczkiewicz, and Jan Matejko. To complete his studies he moved to Munich, and participated in artist travels to Italy and Hungary. In 1890, he moved to Lwów (today Lviv in Ukraine; then Poland) where he began his artist career. He spent time in Zakopane between 1914 and 1921, in 1921 he moved to live in Poznań, where he already had a settled position within the local artists, as during World War I he exhibited his paintings with the Society of Artists. In 1925, he became a member of the Society of the Incentive for Fine Arts (Towarzystwo Zachęty Sztuk Pięknych) in Warsaw. In 1935, in Poznań he celebrated his fiftieth anniversary of creativity, during which his artworks were put in a retrospective exhibition. After the start of World War II he moved to Warsaw, where he was killed during the Warsaw Uprising.

He was married to Anna Czemeryńska (1895), with whom he had three daughters: Stanisława (born 1897), Zofia (1899–1935), and Aleksandra (born 1901).

Augustynowicz painted portraits, which were exhibited in national and international exhibitions. In 1925, during the Portrait of Poland (Portret polski) exhibition in Warsaw, he was awarded the highest honorary title for all of his artworks. In Poznań he painted numerous portraits (inter alia of Wojciech Trąmpczyński, Ignacy Mościcki, and Witold Celichowski), many of which were painted in watercolour. Most of his paintings are made from watercolour and are themed on landscapes and Polish folklore; his artworks are currently exhibited in numerous museums around Poland and in private ownership. Fourteen of his watercolour and oil artworks are located in the National Museum in Poznań.

On November 11, 1937, he received the Officer's Cross of the Order of Polonia Restituta from the President of Poland Ignacy Mościcki, for his service in the field of art (za zasługi na polu sztuki). He died during the Warsaw Uprising.

== Selected paintings ==
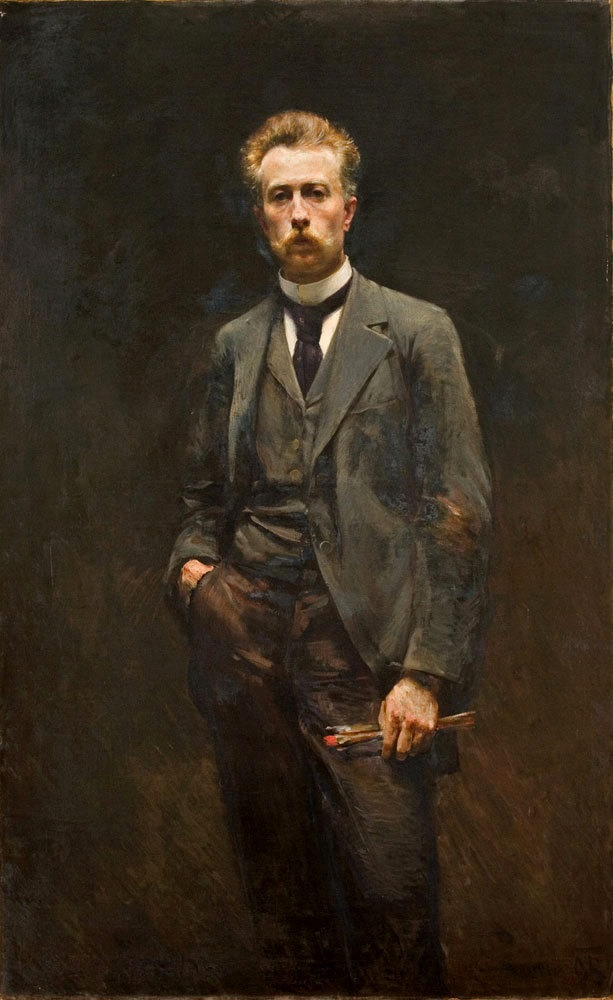
Self-portrait

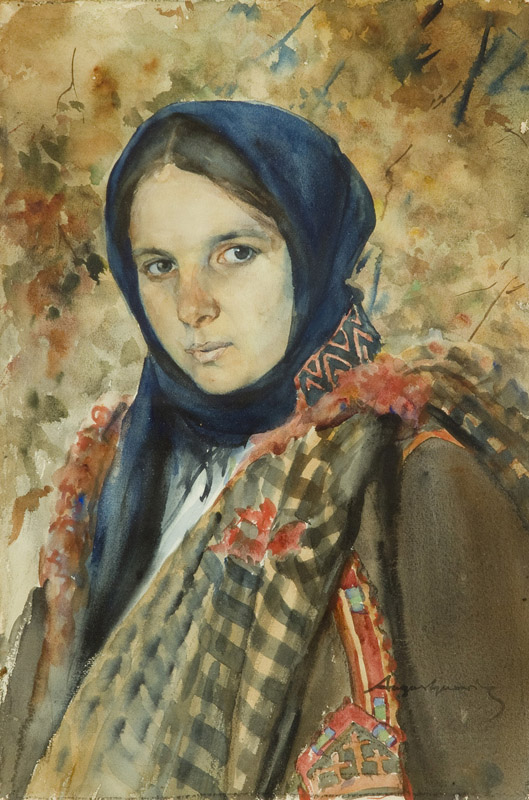
Hutsul Woman

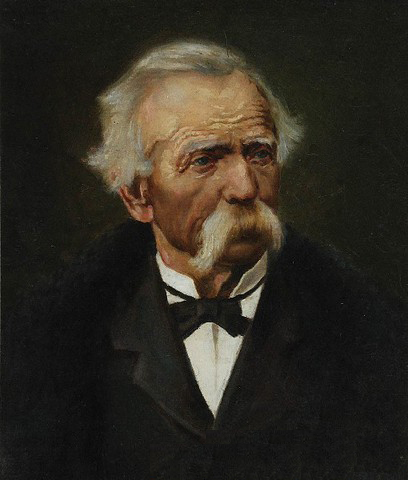
Portrait of the artist's father (1937)

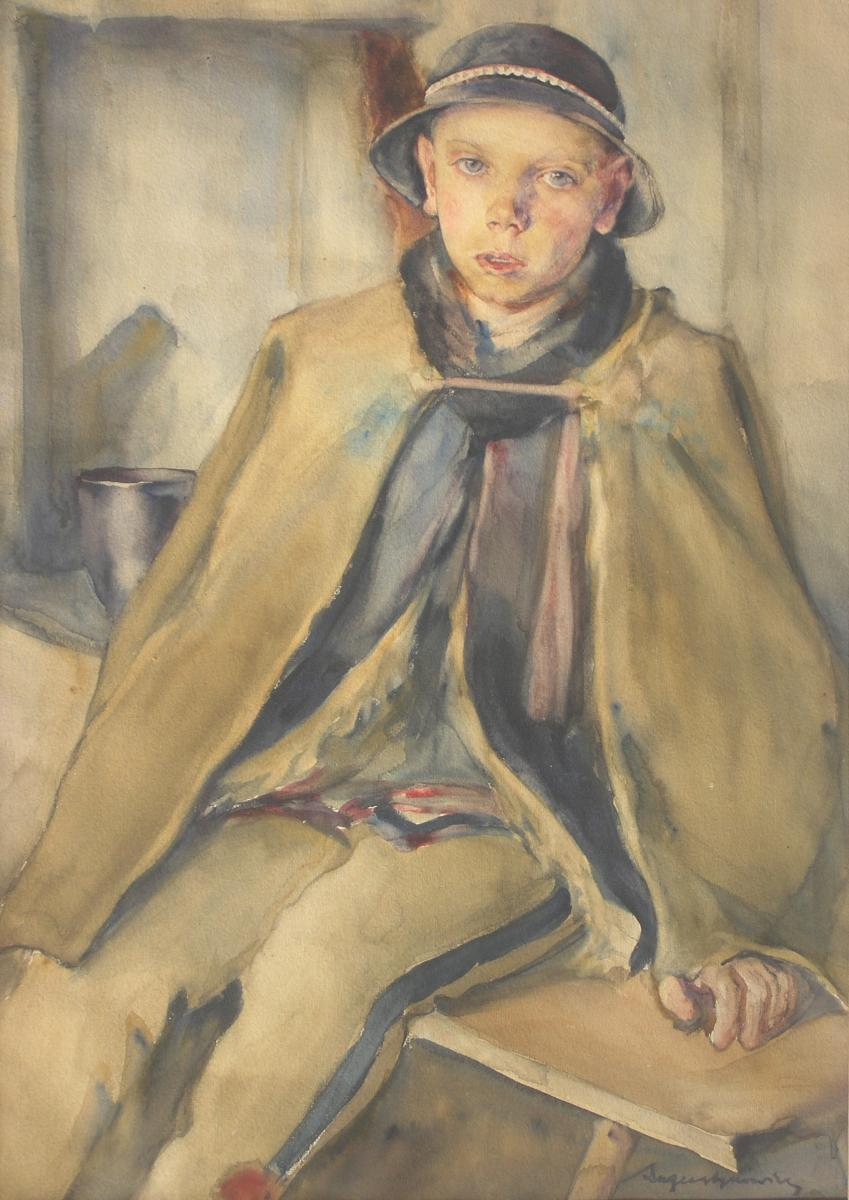
Portrait of a young Goral (1921)

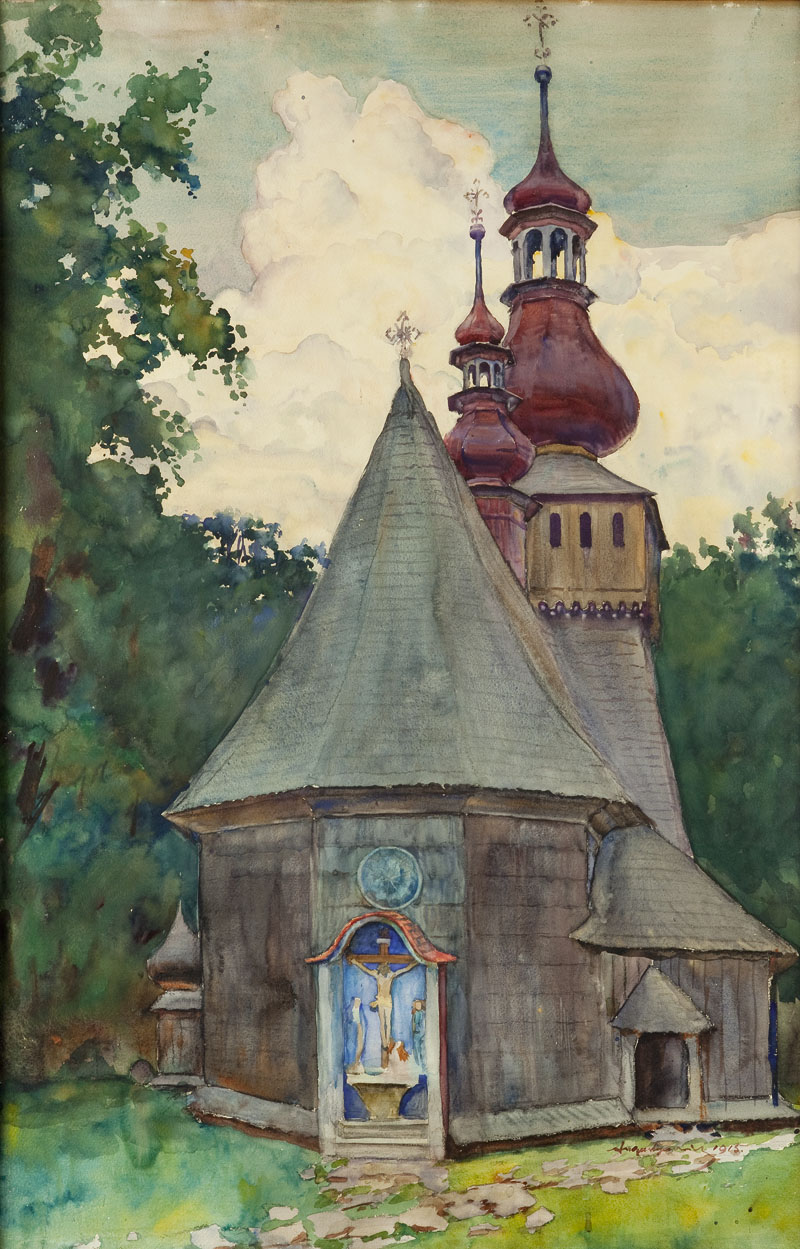
Church in Rabka (1915)

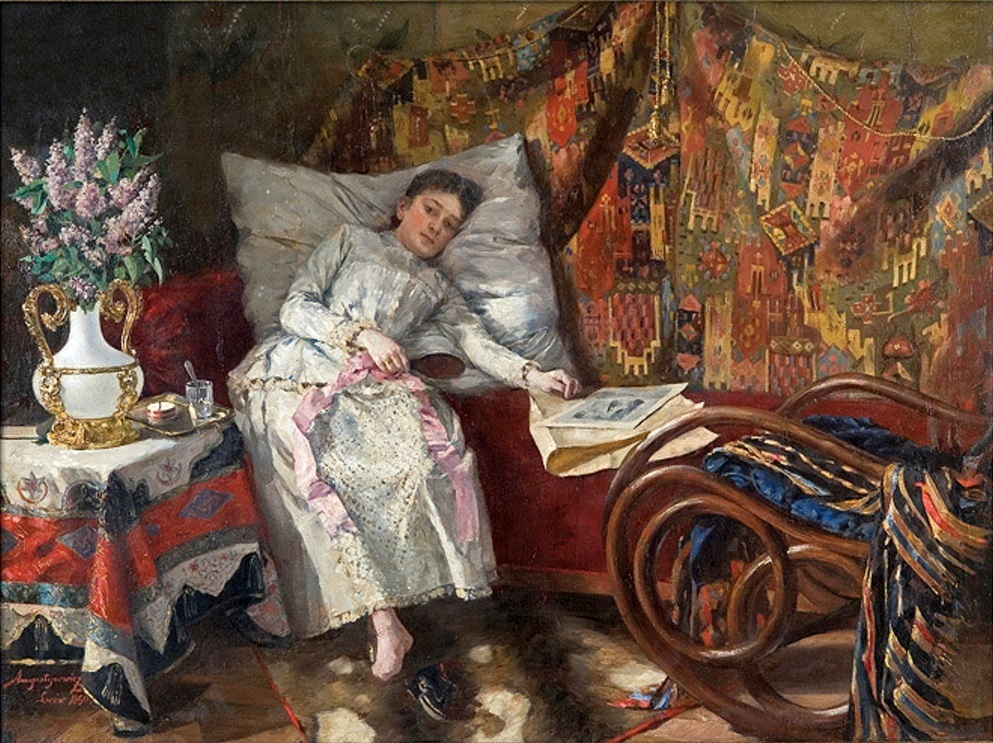
Repose (1890)

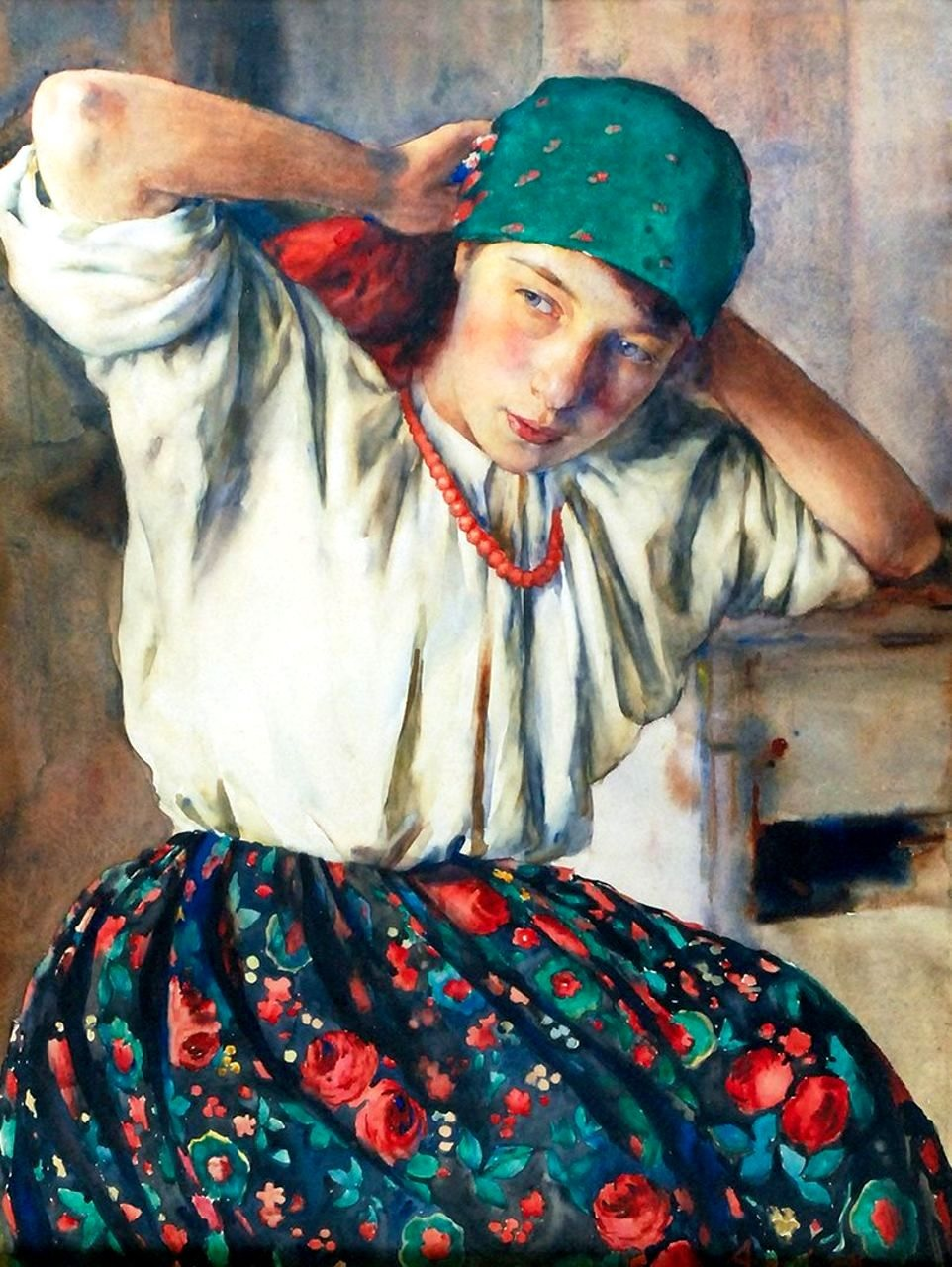
Portrait of a woman
