= Stanisław Dębicki =

Polish painter and illustrator

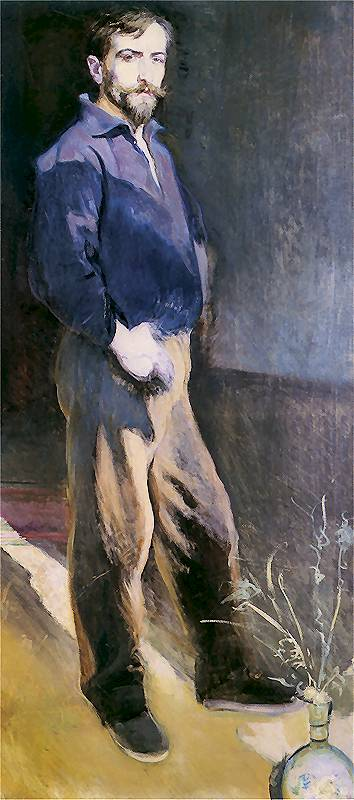
Self-portrait (1900)

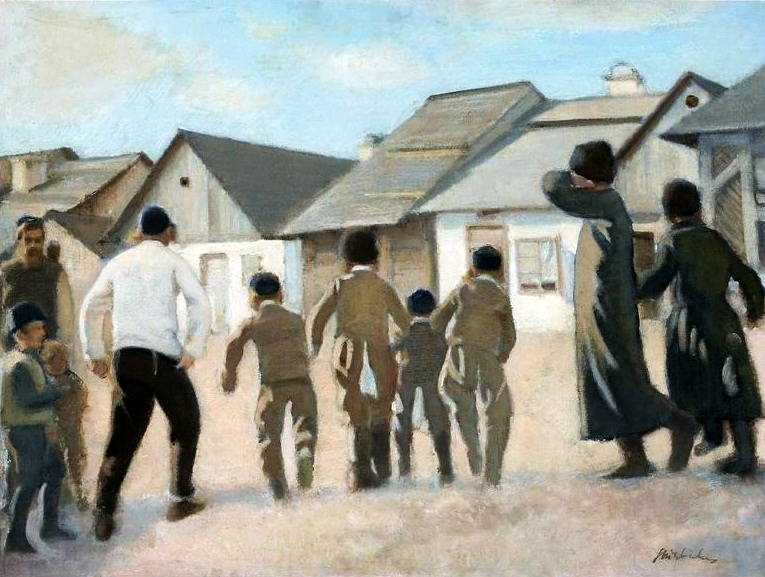
To the Cheder (1919)

Stanisław Mieczysław Dębicki (14 December 1866 – 12 August 1924) was a Polish painter and illustrator.

== Life ==
He was born in Lubaczów. From 1881 to 1884, he studied with Christian Griepenkerl at the Academy of Fine Arts, Vienna, then with Władysław Łuszczkiewicz at the Kraków Academy of Fine Arts. Next, he attended the Academy of Fine Arts, Munich from 1890-1891 and, finally, the Académie Colarossi in Paris. In 1897, he was a member of the Vienna Secession.

His first job was teaching at the Ceramics Industry School (Szkole Przemysłu Ceramicznego) in Kołomyja, then he took a position at a private drawing school operated by Marceli Harasimowicz in Lwów. In 1909, he returned to Kraków to become an assistant at the Art Academy. He was promoted to Professor upon the death of Stanisław Wyspiański.

During this period, he also taught an occasional class at the School of Fine Arts for Women (Szkole Sztuk Pięknych dla Kobiet). In 1923, he became a Full Member of the Academy by authority of Maciej Rataj, President of Poland. Later that same year, in poor health, Dębicki chose to retire.

He would often make painting excursions into the countryside, where he captured scenes from the lives of the local Hutsuls and Galician Jews. Although he worked in almost every artistic medium, he produced relatively few paintings, compared to most artists, and made little effort to exhibit or promote himself. It was once said that he was the only one who didn't appreciate his work.

Dębicki died in 1924 in Kraków.
