= Berson =

Berson is a surname, a patronymic from the Yiddish name Ber. Notable people with the surname include:

- Arthur Berson (1859–1942), German meteorologist
- Jerome A. Berson (1924–2017), American chemist
- Mark Berson (born 1953), American soccer coach
- Mathieu Berson (born 1980), French footballer
- Norman Berson (1926–2019), American politician
- Seweryn Berson (1858–1917), Polish lawyer and composer
- Solomon Berson (1918–1972), American physician and scientist

== See also ==
- Berson, Gironde, commune in the Gironde department in France
