= Ulrich Spiesshofer =

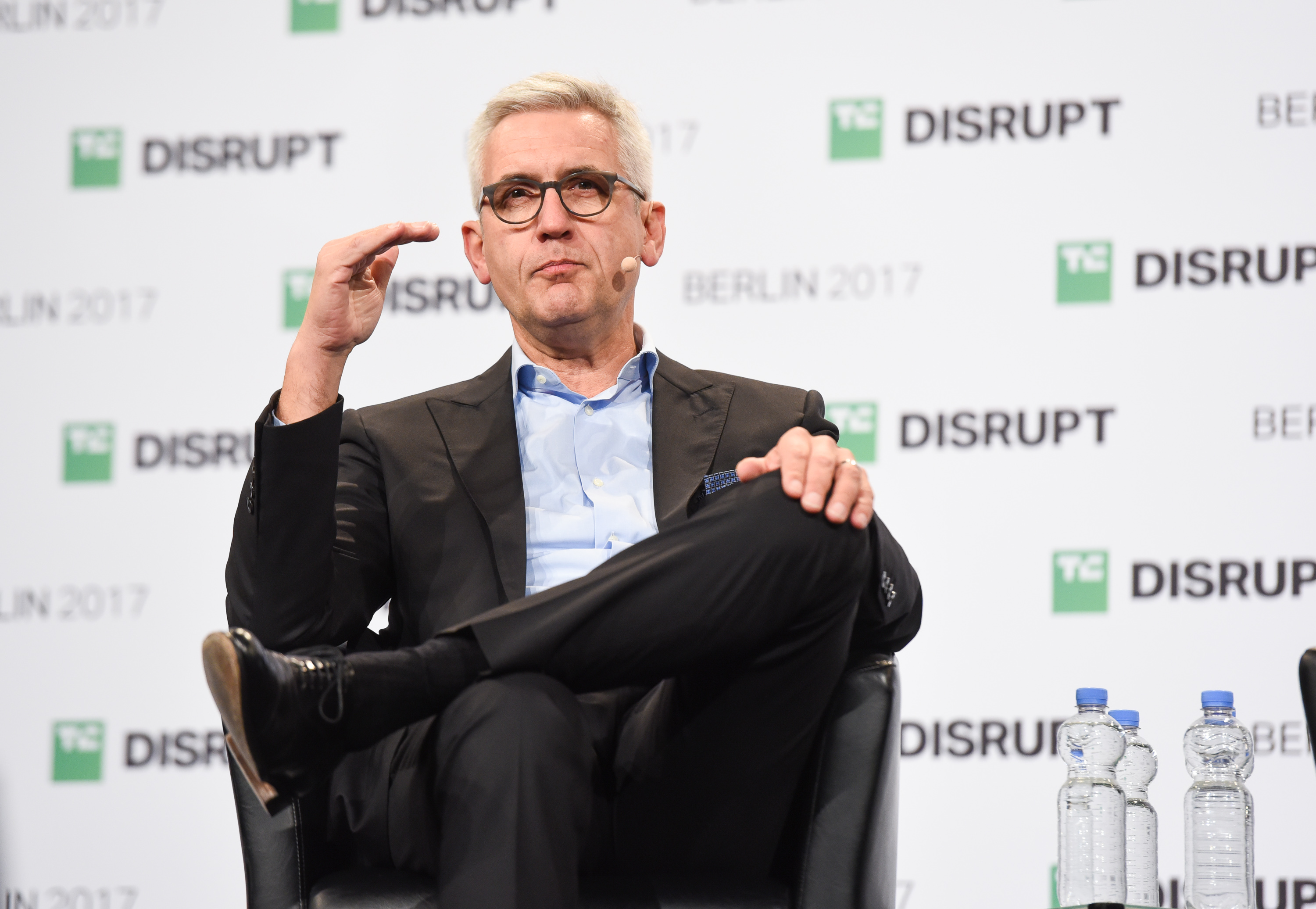
- Spiesshofer speaks at TechCrunch Disrupt Berlin in 2017
- Born: 26 March 1964 (age 61); Aalen, Germany
- Education: University of Stuttgart (MBA, PhD)
- Occupation: business executive
- Title: CEO, ABB
- Term: September 2013–April 2019
- Predecessor: Joseph Hogan
- Successor: Björn Rosengren
- Children: 2

Ulrich Spiesshofer (born 26 March 1964) is a globally experienced Swiss-German business executive who was the former chief executive officer of the ABB Group, a power and automation technology company, headquartered in Zurich, Switzerland. He took up the role as ABB Group CEO on 15 September 2013, succeeding Joe Hogan. He transformed ABB into a leader in digital industries and positioned through active portfolio management and operational improvements all businesses as global No 1 or 2 in their fields. Previously, appointed in 2009, Spiesshofer had headed ABB's Discrete Automation and Motion division, which includes the company's robotics, power conversion, motors and drives businesses and doubled the business with strongly enhanced profitability. Before, he was from 2005 to 2009 executive committee member responsible for strategy, M&A, supply chain, operational excellence & quality as well as ABB's global services business. He retired from his role as CEO of the ABB group in 2019 and built an investment and board portfolio in publicly listed and private companies in Europe, USA and Asia. He is senior advisor of Blackstone, New York, London and Frankfurt and is active as co-investor and board member/chairman in Blackstone portfolio companies. He is founder and chairman of thirdphase AG, his private investment firm based in Zug, Switzerland.

== Early life and education ==
Spiesshofer was born in Aalen, in the southwestern German state of Baden-Wuerttemberg. He holds a PhD in economics as well as a master's degree in business administration and engineering from the University of Stuttgart.

== Career ==
From 1991 to 2002, Spiesshofer worked for AT Kearney management consultants, rising to become the managing director of AT Kearney International, during which time he ran consulting businesses in industries including oil and gas, utilities, telecommunications and automotive, in Europe, Asia and the Americas. He then spent three years as a senior partner and global head of the operations practice at Roland Berger Strategy Consultants in Switzerland.

Spiesshofer joined ABB in 2005 as Executive Committee member responsible for strategy development. In 2010, he was appointed Head of Discrete Automation and Motion, one of ABB's five divisions. There, he led the acquisition of Baldor Electric, the largest maker of industrial motors in North America. It was ABB's biggest acquisition to date with a purchase price of $4.2 billion. In 2013, Spiesshofer was appointed CEO of ABB, a position he held until 2019.

As CEO, he led the ABB acquisition of GE Industrial Systems, which was announced in 2017.

In 2020, he joined American investment company Blackstone Inc. as senior advisor. In 2022, he registered a new company called Thirdphase AG, his private investment vehicle.

== Other activities ==
- European Round Table of Industrialists (ERT), Member
- Infineon, member of supervisory board (since 2020)
- Schlumberger, board member

== Personal life ==
Spiesshofer is an avid skier, sailor and amateur musician, accomplished at the clarinet, saxophone and accordion. He is father of two adult sons and lives in Zug.
