= Marceli Harasimowicz =

Polish landscape painter and museum curator

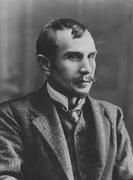
- Photograph from the National Digital Archives of Poland (Narodowe Archiwum Cyfrowe)

Marceli Harasimowicz (1859–1935) was a Polish landscape painter and museum curator.

== Life and work ==
He was born in Warsaw. As a child he followed his mother on her travels abroad. In 1867, he took his first art lessons in Zürich and continued in Paris. Upon returning home, he studied at the Kraków Academy of Fine Arts from 1873 to 1879, then at the Academy of Fine Arts, Vienna, for a year under Carl Wurzinger and finally at the Academy of Fine Arts, Munich, under Wilhelm Lindenschmit the Younger.

From 1885, he lived and worked in Lwów, was the curator of the Municipal Art Gallery from 1907 to 1931 and was a member of the Polish Association of Artists. In 1888, he established a school of painting for women.

He initially specialized in portraits and genre scenes but, after 1890, focused almost entirely on landscapes. Atmospheric representations of sunsets and the wetlands of Kashubia were among his most popular subjects, but he also painted extensively in Podhale, the Pieniny mountains and the Hutsul region. He exhibited under the aegis of the Kraków Society of Friends of Fine Arts, in Vienna and Munich as well as Poland. He also illustrated books and magazines and executed murals in the cathedral at Przemyśl. Paintings in the foyer of the Municipal Theater of Lwów are based on his sketches.

Harasimowicz died in 1935, in Lwów.

== Selected paintings ==
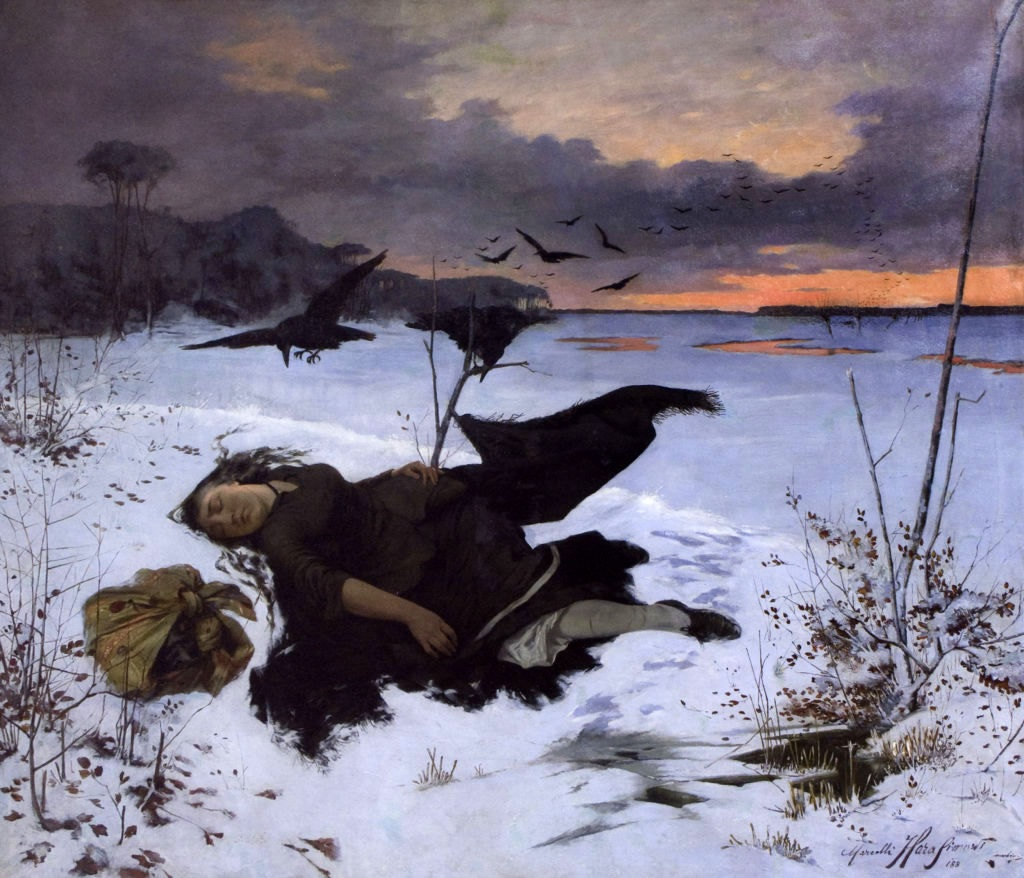
Prey for the Ravens (1888)

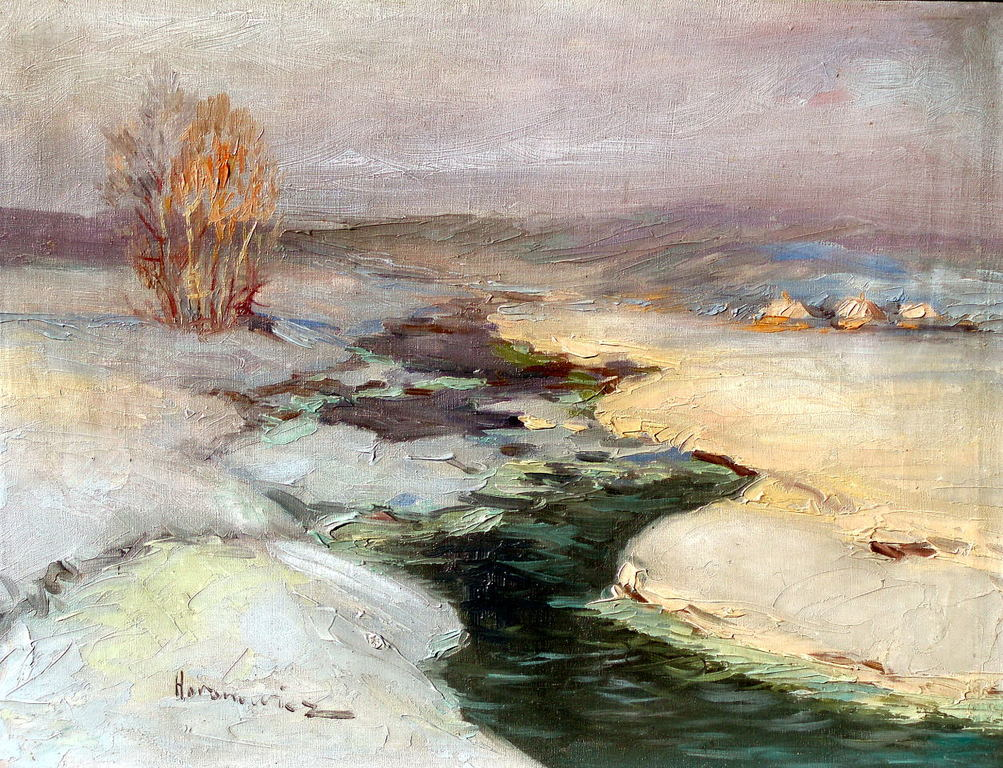
Beskydy in Winter (1903)

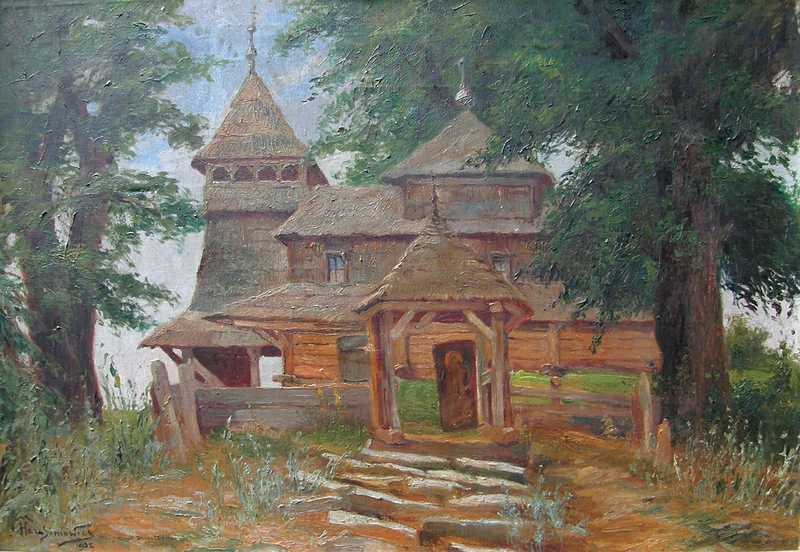
Weryń on the Dniester (1932)

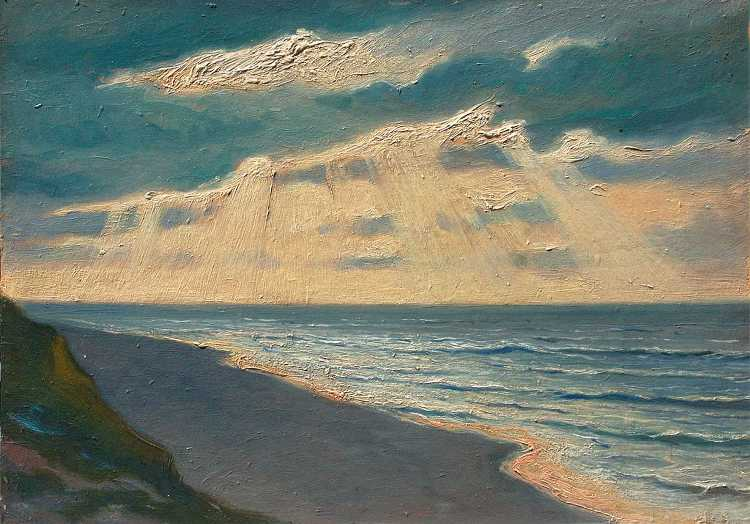
Seascape (1921)
