= Iskrzynia =

- Village
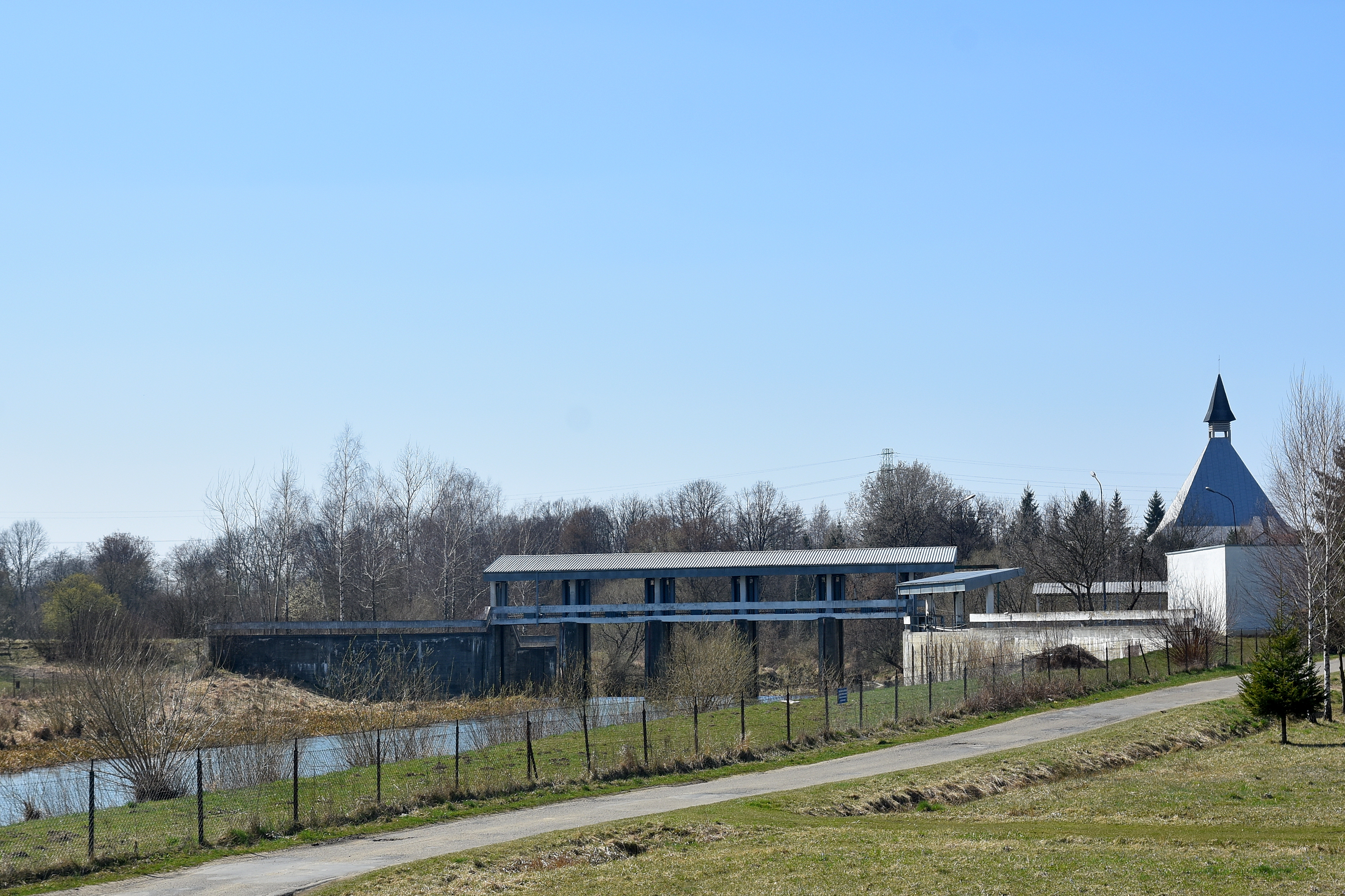

- Location within Poland
- Coordinates: 49°41′1″N 21°51′21″E
- Country: Poland
- Voivodeship: Subcarpathian
- County: Krosno
- Gmina: Korczyna
- Population: 1,200

Iskrzynia [isˈkʂɨɲa] is a village in the administrative district of Gmina Korczyna, within Krosno County, Subcarpathian Voivodeship, in south-eastern Poland.
