= Lviv Arsenal =

Historic building in Lviv, Ukraine

Coordinates: 49°50′29″N 24°02′08″E

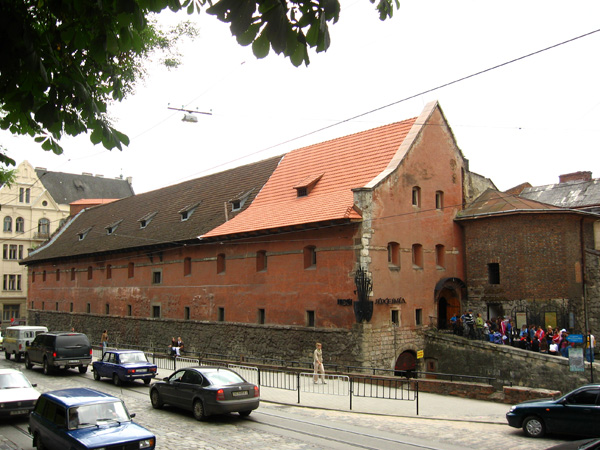
Arsenal Museum in Lviv

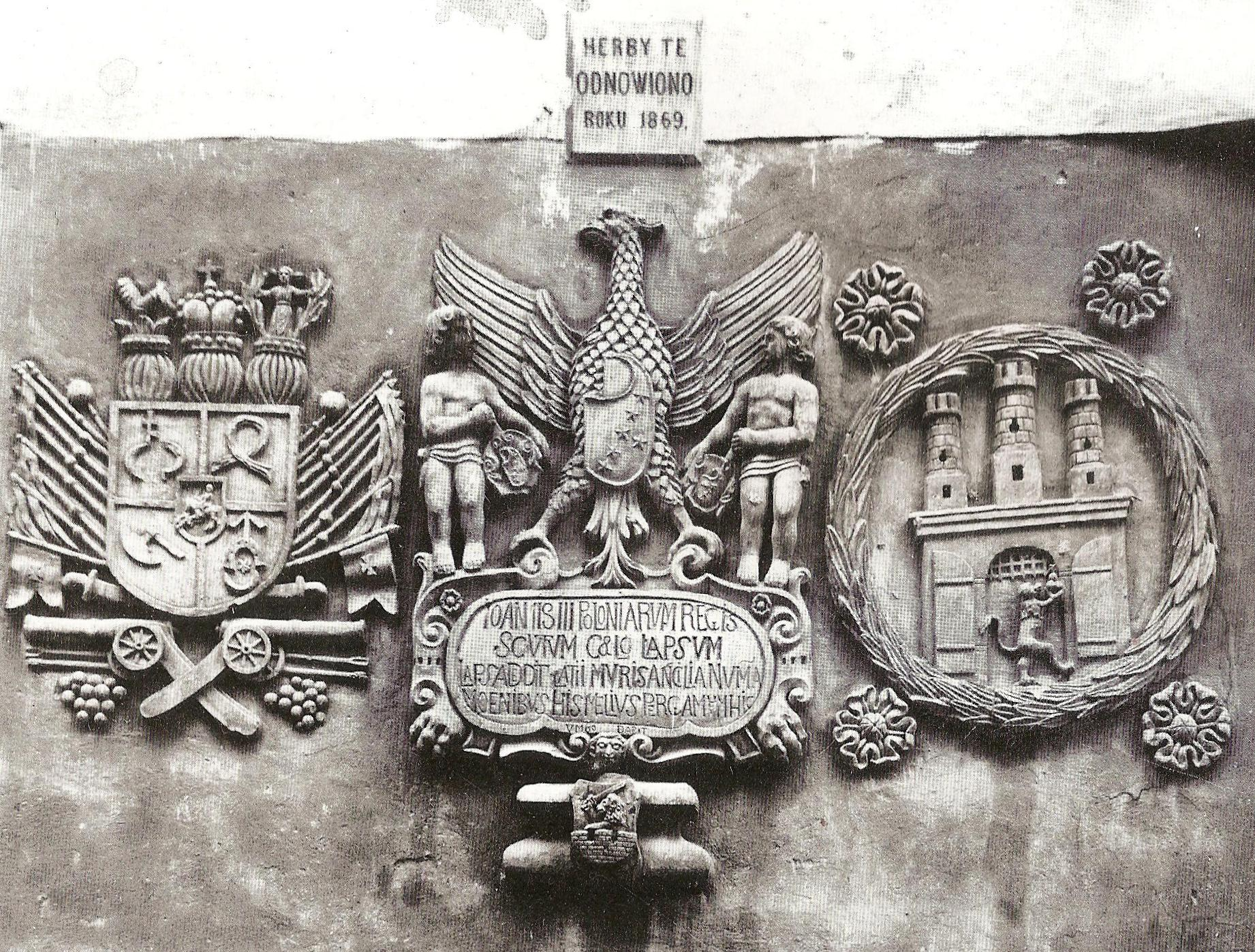
Coats of arms from Lviv's fortifications, which were on the wall of the arsenal before the reconstruction in the 1980s

The City Arsenal (Ukrainian: Львівський міський арсенал, romanized: Lvivskyi miskyi arsenal; Polish: Arsenał Miejski we Lwowie) is the oldest of three historic arsenal buildings in Lviv, Ukraine. The other two are the Royal Arsenal and Sieniawski Arsenal. It is a rectangular two-storey structure with a miniature octagonal tower on the north side. The building, in its present shape, was erected in 1554–56 above a 14th-century structure of unknown function. It was formerly attached to the city walls and featured a torture chamber. The arsenal building was blown up by the Swedes during the Great Northern War but was subsequently restored. At present, it houses an armoury museum.
