= Twardowski =

Twardowski (feminine: Twardowska, plural: Twardowscy) is a Polish surname. Tvardovsky, feminine: Tvardovskaya, are English transliterations from Russian. Notable people with the surname include:

- Jan Twardowski (1915–2006), Polish priest and poet
- Julia Twardowska (born 1995), Polish female volleyball player
- Kasper Twardowski (1592 – ca. 1641), Polish poet
- Kazimierz Twardowski (1866–1938), Polish philosopher and logician
- Romuald Twardowski (1930–2024), Polish composer
- Aleksandr Tvardovsky (1910–1971), Russian poet

== Fictional characters ==
- Pan Twardowski, a fictional character from Polish folklore and literature, who sold his soul in exchange for special powers
- Pani Twardowska from the humorous ballad by Adam Mickiewicz
