= Seweryn Berson =

Polish lawyer and composer

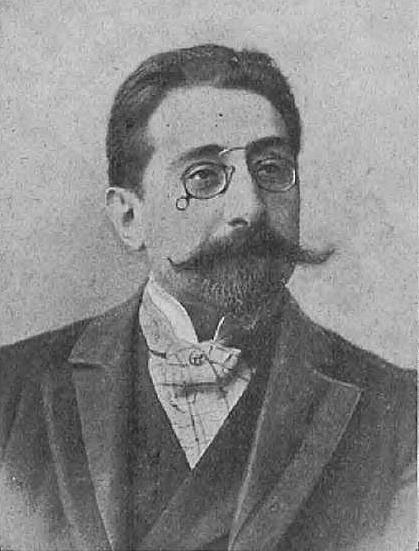
Seweryn Berson 1901

Seweryn Berson (1858–1917) was a Polish lawyer and composer. Born in Nowy Sącz, early in his youth he moved to Lwów (then in Galicia, currently in Ukraine), where he spent most of his life. A student of Berlin-based conservatory of Heinrich Urban, he composed numerous operettas (Lekcja tańców – Dance lesson; 1902), serenades, romances and bagatelles, as well as numerous songs to the lyrics by Heinrich Heine, Henrik Ibsen and Maria Konopnicka. He died March 4, 1917, in Lwów and was buried there.
