= Xavier Oberson =

Swiss law professor

Xavier Oberson is ordinary professor in Swiss and international tax law at the Faculty of Law at the University of Geneva since 1994. He is also the founder and director of the LL.M. Tax at the University of Geneva.

Doctor of Law from the University of Geneva, graduated LL.M. and ITP from Harvard Law School, as well as lawyer admitted to the bar of Geneva, he is also partner at a law firm in Geneva specialized in tax law. Throughout his career, he held numerous offices, in particular that of a judge of the former Swiss Federal Commission of Appeal on Public Charges and that of president to the Federal Expert Commission on "Rechtsformneutrale Besteuerung" (Taxation neutral to the form of incorporation). He also member of the expert group "Collaboration internationale en matière fiscale" (international collaboration in taxation matters), founded by the Swiss Federal Counsel in March 2009.

He has published numerous books and articles in the field of Swiss and international tax law, in particular: Taxing Robots, Helping the Economy to Adapt to the Use of Artificial Intelligence (London, Elgar Publishing, 2019), Précis de droit fiscal international (5th ed., Bern, Staempfli, 2022), Droit fiscal suisse (5th ed., Basel, Helbing & Lichtenhahn, 2021), Switzerland in international tax law (4th ed., Amsterdam, IBFD Publications, 2011). He is also the author of the book International Exchange of Information in Tax Matters : Towards Global Transparency, 2nd edition (London, Elgar Publishing, 2018), which at the beginning 2020 was ranked 13th in the "100 Best Tax Books of All Time" according to BookAuthority, one of the world leaders in recommending non-fictional books. Recently, in June 2020, a French translation of his book Taxing Robots, Taxer les robots : aider l’économie à s’adapter à l’usage de l’intelligence artificielle, was also published by Larcier Editions. He also regularly teaches at various universities abroad.

Every year, he presides the tax law conference "Journée de droit fiscal", organized in cooperation with the "Ordre romand des experts fiscaux diplômés" (OREF; Order of graduated tax experts of Western Switzerland), where he is an honorary member.

Professor Oberson is closely involved in various associations, expert commissions and foundations active in the field of tax law. In this context, he often has to draft legal opinions, collaborate on tax reforms or intervene in parliamentary proceedings. In May 2019, he joined the Tax Committee of the International Academy of Estate and Trust Law (IAETL). He is also a member of the Permanent Scientific Committee of the International Fiscal Association (IFA), of the Advisory Council of the International Bureau of Fiscal Documentation (IBFD), of the Society of Trust and Estate Practitioners (STEP), among other memberships.

In 2012, Professor Oberson was awarded the price of "STEP Private Client Awards, The Geoffrey Shindler Award for Outstanding Contribution to the Profession".

From 2016, he started a research on the taxation of robots and their activities. In this context, several scientific studies have been published and are about to be. The emulation engendered by these researches allowed Xavier Oberson to be chosen for the famous opening lesson of the spring semester 2017 of the University of Geneva. After three years working on the subject, he published in May 2019 the book Taxing Robots: Helping the Economy to Adapt to the Use of Artificial Intelligence, in which he analyzes robots taxation as a possible solution to the anticipated problem of declining tax revenues due to the growth of robotization and artificial intelligence in the business world.

Among other activities, he is also the president of the Montreux Jazz Artists Foundation and a member of the foundation committee of the Montreux Jazz Festival as well as President of the Foundation Council of the Centre d’Art Contemporain Genève. He has also recently been appointed President of Foundation's Board of Trustees of the Fondation du Grand Théâtre de Genève, a foundation whose aim is to organize lyrical, choreographic and dramatic performances.
