= Batiar =

Working class subculture of Lwów

Batiar (Polish: batiar, baciar; Ukrainian: батяр, romanized: batiar), plural form batiary (baciary, батяри) is a popular name for a certain class of inhabitants of the city of Lviv (Polish: Lwów, German: Lemberg), considered to be a part of the city's subculture. Associated with Lviv's knajpa lifestyle, batiary became a cultural phenomenon at the beginning of the twentieth century, although their roots go back to the mid-nineteenth century, when Lviv was part of the Austro-Hungarian Empire. The batiar subculture declined following the Soviet annexation of Eastern Galicia and Volhynia and Lviv's attachment to the Ukrainian SSR, during which Soviet authorities expelled most of the Polish inhabitants and suppressed the local Polish culture. However, the use of the word "batiar" continued, and it remains a popular term of endearment in today's Lviv. Since 2008 Lviv has celebrated "International Batiar Day", started by the "Dik-Art" company in cooperation with the Lviv City Council.

== Roots of the term ==
BATIARY

Batiary, to dzieci so lwoskij ulicy
Wysoły, z fasonym, skory du kantania:
Na takich gdzi indzij mówiu "ulicznicy"
Co ni wytrzymuji jednak purówniania.

— z tomiku" Krajubrazy syrdeczny".

The Origins of the term batiar may be Hungarian, as from the nineteenth century Lviv was a part of the Austro-Hungarian Empire, some of its policemen were Hungarians, and they may have brought the term to the local dialect from their native language.

Definition by the Encyclopædia Britannica:

Betyar (pl. betyarok) a highwayman in 19th-century Hungary. The word is Iranian in origin and entered the Hungarian language via Turkish and Serbo-Croatian; its original meaning was “young bachelor” or “lad.” While most betyárok were originally shepherds, whose position in rural society was marginal, many were army deserters or young men fleeing conscription. They are first mentioned in legal documents about 1800.

19th-century Polish writer Jan Lam, a native of Stanislawów (modern Ivano-Frankivsk), is considered by some to be the inventor of the term batiar (baciar, baciarz).

== History ==
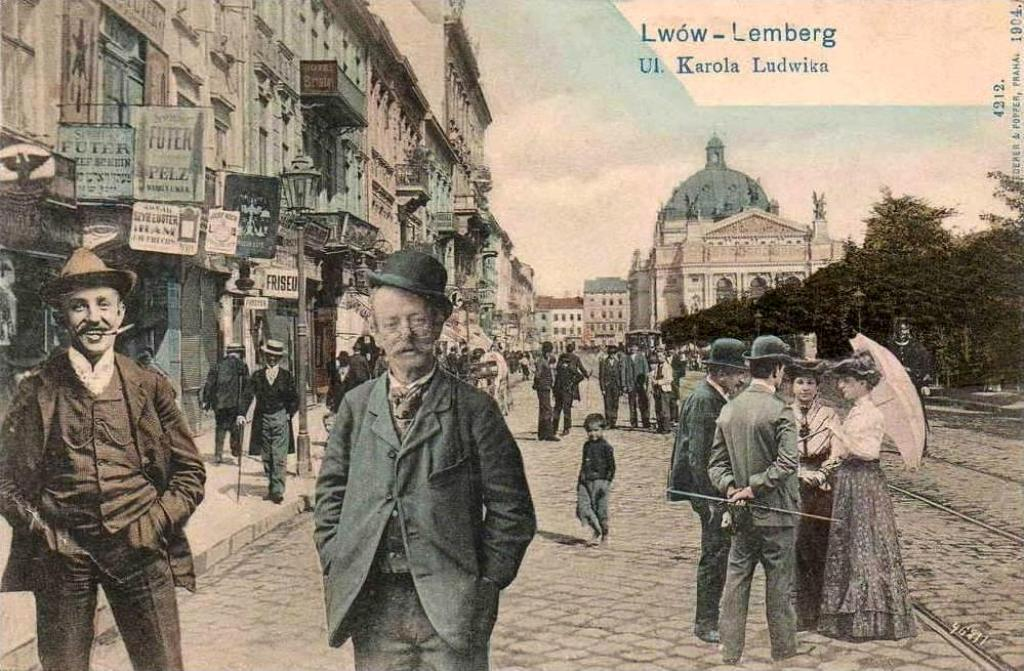
Depiction of Lemberg batiary on a postcard from 1904

Under Austrian rule, Lviv (Lwów, Lemberg) was reputed to be one of the empire's most crime-ridden cities. The roots of the batiar subculture can be found in the city's infamous Brygidki prison, which was established in 1785. The prison's inmates, colloquially known as andrus (Ukrainian: яндрус, yandrus), bosany, or, later, antek, developed their own argot, which was studied by Karol Estreicher and Henryk Felsztynski during the 1860s. Elements of Lviv criminal jargon are also found in literary works by Ivan Franko and other contemporary local authors.

One of the early mentions of the term batiar can be found in the Lviv newspaper Dilo from 1889, which claimed the word to be of Turkish origin and have the meaning of "young vagabond among the Persians". Batiar was the name for lower-class inhabitants of Lwów (the "elite of Lviv's streets"). Batiary spoke a distinctive version of the Polish language, called Bałak, a variant of the Lwów dialect.

Originating in Polish, the term batiar eventually became common in the Ukrainian language as well. Initially it had a negative connotation, and was used among others to describe the murderer of Empress Elisabeth of Austria in a popular Ukrainian folk song of the time. The creation of the popular image of batiary started from 1911, when they became heroes of a series of stories published by humour magazine Pocięgiel. Similar publications from other media soon followed.

Batiars were romanticized in popular culture, but in many cases their activities were nothing other than theft, street crime and fraud. Polish author Gabriela Zapolska compared batiary to the Parisian Apaches.

Batiars are claimed to have played an important role in aiding the Polish side during the Battle of Lemberg in 1918 due to their good knowledge of the city. As a result, their image was glorified in the Polish media, which eventually had an influence on the emergence of a positive attitude to batiars in the culture of local Ukrainians as well.

Dynamo Kyiv footballer Oleksandr Skotsen, a natie of Lviv's Levandivka neighbourhood, was nicknamed "Lviv batiar" in a 1992 publication dedicated to his life and career.

== In other cities ==
Outside of Lviv, the phenomenon of batiary existed in other cities of Galicia, most notably in Stanislawów (Ivano-Frankivsk), Przemyśl and Boryslav. Analogous groups in other cities of the region were known under local names. In Kolomyia the local criminals and petty thieves were known as ivanky, and in Ternopil as makhabudy (likely from German Wagabond).

== Cultural influence ==
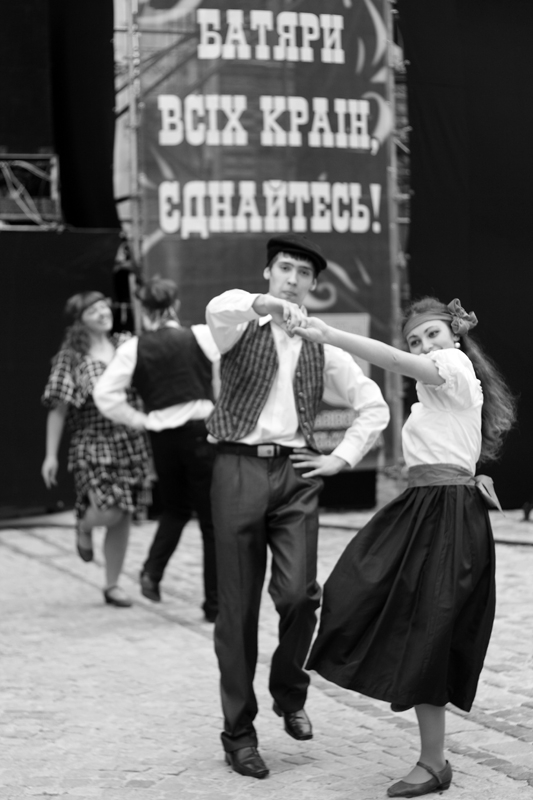
Celebration of the Batiar Day in Lviv, 2008

In the popular imagination, a typical Batiar was usually financially challenged yet an honest and generous urban citizen with a great sense of humor. Among the most famous Batiars, were such figures as the radio personalities Kazimierz Wajda and Henryk Vogelfänger of the highly popular Wesoła Lwowska Fala radio show, as well as the football star Michał Matyas who played for Pogoń Lwów and the national team of Poland.

The term is still in local use, albeit in the Ukrainian language. Modern Batiar are the playboys of the Ukrainian Piedmont, as Eastern Galicia is sometimes referred to, and are easily identified by exquisite manners, stylish attire, and the obligatory attribute of every Batiar, a lyaska (walking stick).

The Batiar's Day in Lviv replaced the Soviet holiday of 1 May (the Labor Day), the Day of Worker's Solidarity. Batiars also adopted the proletarian motto: Batiars of all countries unite!.

At the time of the rise of the Batiar's culture, Lviv's Polish-Jewish poet Emanuel Szlechter wrote lyrics for a song that became well known in Poland, Tylko we Lwowie (Only in Lwów; from the comedy film The Vagabonds) which became the anthem of the Batiars, and the accompanying music was written by another Polish-Jew Henryk Wars. The Ukrainian repertoire of that song is performed by Yurko Hnatovsky (in retro-psychedelic style) and Zosya Fedina.

Batiars are seen as embodying the unique culture and spirit of Lviv, and are often celebrated in local folklore and popular culture.

=== Batiars in the 21st century ===
The urban subculture of today's Lviv continues to develop with different styles arising out of its ferment. Among the most prominent representatives are Vova zi Lvova, Orest Lyutyi, and many others.

== Quotes ==
They were certain petty hooligans (beszketnyks), you know, breaking someone's window, somewhere "after a beer" arguing for a girl, kicking each other in a face. But it never reached a kind of bloody thrashing. Rather, batiars, they fought with the robbers ("evil-deeders"), they called them "kinders", banishing them out of their district, punched them, and all the rest.

(Bohdan Rybka, batiar)

Batiar could let himself to his top hat to wear a tie and to a checkered kamizelka [waistcoat] to wear a nice bow tie, and, of course the lyaska [cane] - that was as an attribute.

(Ivan Radkovets, Lviv Studies specialist)

A woman of a batiar could not have been called a batiarka, manners didn't allow. However, to become a batiar's koliezanka [girlfriend] that was an honor for a dame.

Each Lvivianka always strived to some kind of aesthetics and romance, while at the same time a fun with that. Maybe it is a bit extravagant, but the point is that you can relax when changing a routine to a such holiday (the Batiar's Day).

(Miroslava Sydor, batiar's koliezanka)

== See also ==
- Semantic change
- Wesoła Lwowska Fala
