= Włada Majewska =

Polish journalist and entertainer (1911–2011)

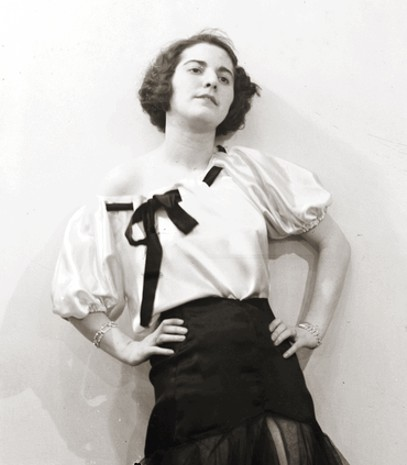
- Majewska in 1936
- Born: Włodzimira Władysława Majewska; 19 March 1911; Lemberg, Kingdom of Galicia and Lodomeria, Austria-Hungary
- Died: 18 May 2011 (aged 100); Chislehurst, London Borough of Bromley, England, United Kingdom
- Education: University of Edinburgh
- Spouse: Wiktor Budzyński
- Parent(s): Zygmunt and Katarzyna
- Presenting career
- Show: Wesoła Lwowska Fala
- Station: Polish Radio Lwów
- Network: Polskie Radio
- Network: Radio Free Europe

Włada Majewska (19 March 1911 – 18 May 2011) was a Polish radio journalist, actress and singer.

== Early life ==
Włada Majewska was born on 19 March 1911 to Zygmunt and Katarzyna Majewska in, what was then named, Lemberg. She studied law at John Casimir University and graduated from the Faculty of Administrative Law at the University of Edinburgh.

== Career ==
In 1930, she began working at Polish Radio Lwów. From 1932, she performed as a singer and parodist, together with the duo Szczepcia and Tońka in Wiktor Budzyński's Wesoła Lwowska Fala. After the outbreak of World War II, she left Lviv and started performing Romania as part of an artistic ensemble. On 8 March 1940, the band Wesoła Lwowska Fala left Romania and travelled to France via Yugoslavia and Italy to join the Polish Army in France. On 22 June 1940, after the fall of France, Wesoła Lwowska Fala was evacuated to Scotland on a small English freighter. The band performed there two days later. Wesoła Lwowska Fala was part of the 10th Armoured Cavalry Brigade of General Maczek, where they performed for the Polish Army over 800 times, performing on truck platforms, soldiers' barracks and bunkers.

After the war ended, she stayed in the United Kingdom and in 1946 married Budzyński in Edinburgh. Majewska became a producer of Marian Hemar's cabarets and was an actress in his theatre in London.

In the 1940s, Majewska moved to London and renewed her performance career. In 1952, she became a presenter for Radio Free Europe. After the fall of communism, Radio Free Europe's London office closed, and Majewska ensured that its archives were preserved. In 1994, Majewska donated the London archives of Radio Free Europe and recordings of Marian Hemar's work to Polskie Radio. In 2005, for the 80th anniversary of Polskie Radio, she was presented with the Diamond Microphone for her contributions to Polish radio.

== Later life and death ==
For the last few years of her life, Majewska was cared for in a home run by Polish nuns in Chislehurst. She died there on 18 May 2011 at the age of 100.
