= Lwów dialect =

Polish dialect spoken in Lviv, Ukraine

- gwara lwowska
- Region: Kresy
- Language family: Indo-European: Balto-Slavic; Slavic; West Slavic; Lechitic; Polish; Lesser Polish; Lwów dialect
- Dialects: Bałak

Language codes
- ISO 639-3: –
- IETF: pl-u-sd-ua46

The Lwów dialect (Polish: gwara lwowska, Yiddish: לעמבערג דיאלעקט) is a subdialect (gwara) of the Polish language characteristic of the inhabitants of the then Polish city of Lviv (Polish: Lwów, Yiddish: לעמבעריק), now in Ukraine. Based on the substratum of the Lesser Polish dialect, it was heavily influenced by borrowings (mostly lexical) from other languages spoken in Galicia, notably Ukrainian (Ruthenian), German and Yiddish.

One of the peculiarities of the Lwów dialect was its popularity. Unlike many other Polish dialects, it was seen by its speakers as neither inferior to standard Polish nor denoting people of humble origin. That caused it to be used both by common people and university professors alike. It was also one of the first Polish dialects to be properly classified and to have a dictionary published. Despite that, the best known form of the Lwów dialect was the bałak, a sociolect of the lower class (batiars), street hooligans and youngsters.

== History ==
The Lwów dialect emerged in the 19th century and gained much popularity and recognition in the 1920s and 1930s, in part due to countrywide popularity of numerous artists and comedians using it. Among them were Marian Hemar, Szczepcio, and Tońcio Szczepcio i Tońcio also known as Szczepko i Tońko, the latter two being authors of the highly acclaimed Wesoła lwowska fala weekly broadcast in the Polish Radio. Emanuel Szlechter, the screenwriter of many popular films, such as The Vagabonds and songwriter of Polish pre-war hits, wrote some of his songs in the Lwów dialect ("Ni ma jak Lwów" "Nothing is like Lwow", a song from The Vagabonds).

The dialect is one of the two main sources of galicisms (galicyzmy – words originating from the Kingdom of Galicia and Lodomeria) in standard Polish. Some words of the dialect have entered into the vocabulary of modern Polish language, and many others were adopted by other regional and social varieties of Polish, notably the grypsera. Some elements of the dialect remain in use in contemporary Ukrainian spoken in modern Lviv.

In 1939, the city of Lwów was annexed by the Soviet Union and in the turbulent decade that followed the pre-war population structure of the city changed dramatically. With most of the Polish population expelled, the number of speakers of the dialect sharply declined, but the modern language of the members of Polish minority in Ukraine living in Lviv still resembles the prewar Lwów dialect. It is also cultivated by émigré circles abroad. It remained not only a part of popular culture in post-war Poland thanks to numerous artists and writers, notably Witold Szolginia, Adam Hollanek, and Jerzy Janicki, but also part of the language of many notable personalities who were born in Lwów before the war. Speakers of the Lwów dialect can be found in such cities as Wrocław and Bytom, where the majority of the expelled Polish inhabitants of Lwów settled.

== Phonology ==
=== Vowels ===
Among the most characteristic phonological features of the Lwów dialect were the changes in vowel quality influenced by word stress. For example:

- unstressed ie, e merging into i, y:
  - in syllables before the stressed syllable: Standard Polish człowiekowi → Lwów dialect człuwikowi, wielbłądy → wilbłondy, kieliszkami → kiliszkami, ciekawy → cikawy, elektryczny → iliktryczny
  - in syllables after the stressed syllable: Standard Polish człowiek → Lwów dialect człowik, nawet → nawyt, majątek → majontyk
  - at the end of a word: Standard Polish ale → Lwów dialect ali, ciągle → wciągli, w Polsce → w Polscy, wasze piękne miasto → waszy pienkny miastu
- unstressed o merging into u:
  - in syllables before the stressed syllable: Standard Polish oferma → Lwów dialect uferma, godzina → gudzina, kobita → kubita, doprowadził → dupruwadził
  - in syllables after the stressed syllable: Standard Polish czegoś → Lwów dialect czeguś, ogon → ogun, ściskając → ściskajunc
  - at the end of a word: Standard Polish jutro → Lwów dialect jutru

In songs, the vowels of some words were pronounced inconsistently. Differing musical rhythms could change which syllable of a word was stressed, which is why, for example, one could hear both policaj and pulicaj ("police") in the same song.

=== Consonants ===
Younger speakers of the Lwów dialect often pronounced the consonant ⟨ł⟩ as a semivowel (u̯) syllable-finally and word-finally. Unlike today's Standard Polish, however, the older articulation as a denti-alveolar (ɫ) was preserved before vowels (in words like pudełeczko ("box", diminutive) and łuk "bow").

The consonant ⟨m⟩ before ⟨i⟩, and ⟨mi⟩ before other vowels, was pronounced as [mɲ] ⟨mń⟩. For example, Standard Polish ⟨miód⟩ [mʲut] was pronounced as [mɲut].

=== Phonological changes ===
In the Lwów dialect, as in other dialects, there were various phonological changes including assimilation, dissimilation and consonant cluster simplification.

Examples of assimilation and voicing changes
change	example	change	example
xt → kt	autochthony → autoktony	łń → mń	kołnierza → komnirza, żołnierz → żomnirz
mkn → nkn	zamknięty → zanknienty	mv → mb	tramwaj → trambaj
ks → xs	weksla → wechsla	ż → dz	żelazny → dzylazny
nz → ndz	benzyna → bendzyna	devoicing	nożyczki → noszyczki
word-initial voicing	tektura → dektura	word-medial voicing	wielki → wielgi
