= Wesoła Lwowska Fala =

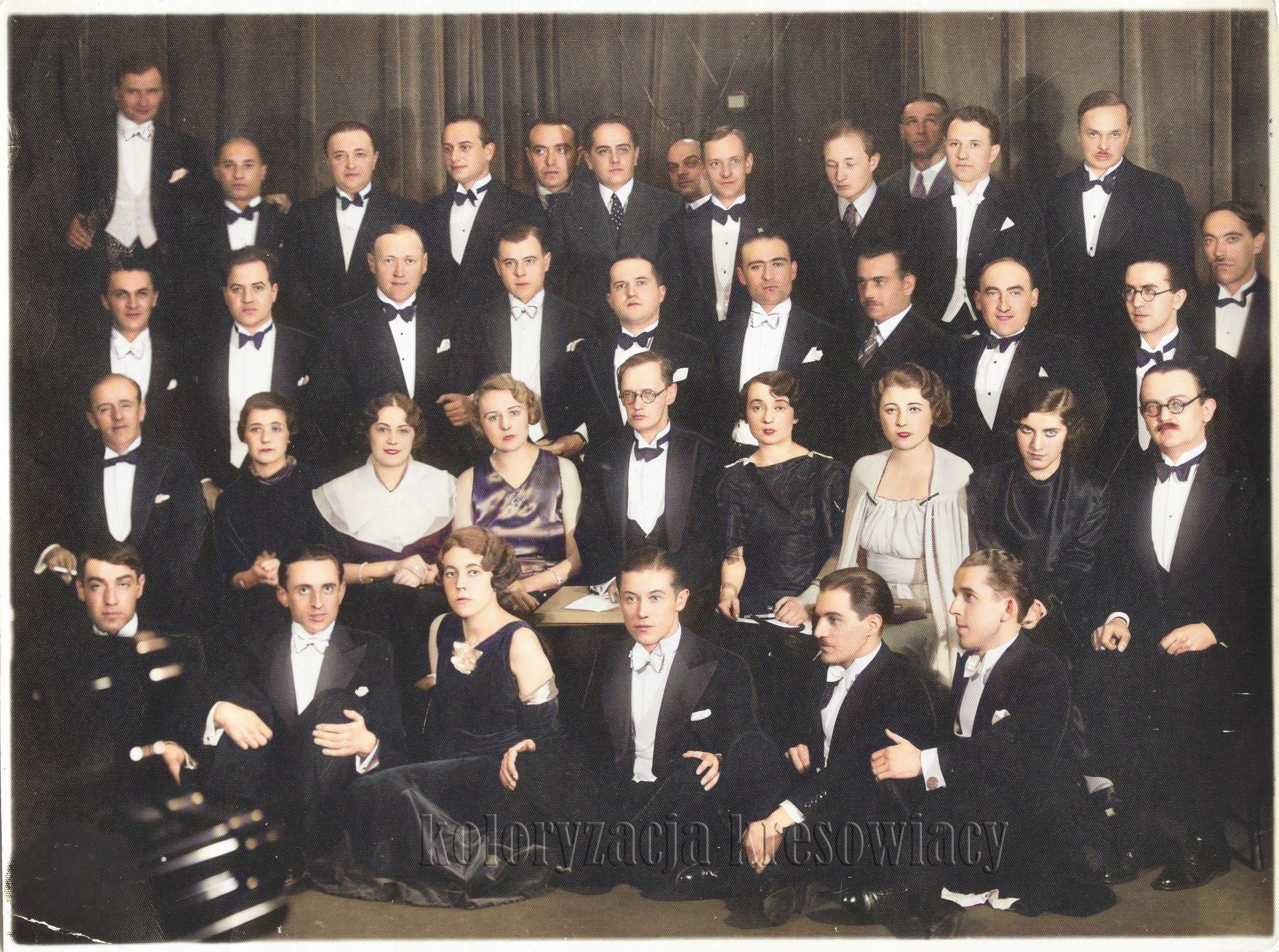
- A group portrait of the cast, 1936. From the National Digital Archives
- Other names: Tajoj
- Country of origin: Second Polish Republic
- Language: Polish
- Home station: Polish Radio Lwów
- Starring: Szczepko; Tońko; Włada Majewska
- Written by: Wiktor Budzyński
- Recording studio: Lwów
- Original release: 1933 – 1939

Wesoła Lwowska Fala (transl. Lwów's Merry Wave) was a weekly radio program of the Polish Radio Lwów, broadcast every Sunday by the Polish Radio. The broadcast, composed mostly of light music, sketches and humour, was among the most popular programmes of the Polish Radio in the period between the world wars. Started in 1933, it remained on the air until the Invasion of Poland of 1939.

As the idea of an all-day-long programme prepared by one of the regional branches of the Polish Radio, rather than by the central editorial office, was a novelty, the initial broadcasts were prepared almost free of charge by amateur journalists and comedians. With time it became one of the most successful broadcasts of the Polish Radio, recognized countrywide.

The author of most of the sketches was Wiktor Budzyński. Among the best-known comedians associated with Wesoła Lwowska Fala were the Szczepcio and Tońcio duo, known for their dialogues in the Lwów dialect. Other notable personalities were Mieczysław Monderer and Adolf Fleischen who parodied the local Jewish community, as well as Włada Majewska, Wilhelm Korabiowski and many more. After the outbreak of World War II most of the artists were mobilized into the Polish Army and successfully evacuated from Poland. They served as the Wesoła Lwowska Fala Theatre on various fronts of the war. After the war most of them remained in exile.

== See also ==
- Radio stations in interwar Poland
