= Polish Radio Lwów =

Polish Radio Lwów (Polish: Polskie Radio Lwów) was a station of the Polish Radio, located in the city of Lwów (now Lviv, Ukraine), which in the interbellum period belonged to the Second Polish Republic. It was regarded as the second most popular station of the Polish Radio, behind Radio Warsaw.

== History ==
The station was opened on January 13, 1930, during the Eastern Trade Fair. Its frequency was 795 kHz and range - 100 kilometers. Its office was located in a building at Batory 6 Street, and a Marconi transmitter, purchased in England, was placed in the complex of the Eastern Trade Fair. At first, broadcasts were daily between 17:45 and 20:00.

Broadcasts of the station were very popular across Poland, and the Wesoła Lwowska Fala, whose actors used Lwów dialect, was among top shows among Polish listeners. Polish Radio Lwow also played classical music, news, lectures and liturgical services. Among those employed at the station, there were several Polish Jews, with composer Henryk Wars and songwriter Emanuel Szlechter as the most prominent. Lwów was the city with most radio owners in Poland, in mid-1939 there were around 45,000 radios, owned by its inhabitants. In the summer of 1938, construction of new office began, it was planned to be completed in mid-1940.

Following the outbreak of the World War II, the campus of the radio was bombed by the Luftwaffe on September 16, 1939 and ceased service.

On October 29, 1992, 53 years after the Polish September Campaign, another Polish-language radio station began its broadcasts in the now-Ukrainian city of Lviv. It uses equipment of a private Ukrainian station Radio Nezalezhnist and its range is 100 kilometres (62 mi).

== Employees ==
- Witold Scazighino - director,
- Juliusz Petry - program director,
- Witold Korecki - technical director,
- Adam Soltys - music director,
- Ada Artzt - children broadcasts director,
- rev. Michal Rekas - religious broadcasts director,
- prof. Rudolf Wacek - sports broadcasts director,

== Announcers ==
- Bohdan Sadowski,
- Celina Nahlik,
- Jerzy Tepa,
- Wiktor Budzynski,
- Czeslaw Halski,
- Kazimierz Wajda.

== Programs ==
- Nasze Oczko (Our Eye),
- Wesole Niedziele (Funny Sundays),
- Wesola Lwowska Fala (Merry Lwow Wave),
- Ta-joj,
- Gospoda pod Lwowem (A chop-house near Lwow),
- Rozmowa z lwami pod ratuszem (Conversation with lions at the town hall),
- Wesoly tygodnik dzwiekowy (Merry sound weekly),
- Radio Chorym (Radio for the sick), first Polish broadcast for the sick, created in 1931,
- Broadcasts of Sunday services from Roman Catholic, Armenian and Greek-Catholic cathedrals,
- Teatr Wyobrazni (Theatre of Imagination),
- Kronika naukowa (Scientific chronicle), created by Kazimierz Ajdukiewicz, Stanislaw Lempicki, and Leon Chwistek,
- Lwowska Warta - a program for the countryside,
- Dni Regionalne (Regional Days), broadcasts from towns and cities of the area, including Zaleszczyki, Tarnopol, Stanislawow and Przemysl.

== See also ==
- Radio stations in interwar Poland
