= Krzysztof Świątek =

Polish journalist

- Education: Cardinal Stefan Wyszyński University in Warsaw (M.A., 2003)
- Occupations: Journalist; historian; essayist
- Years active: 2000–present
- Employer(s): Tygodnik Solidarność, TVP, Polskie Radio

Krzysztof Świątek is a Polish political scientist and journalist, former editor-in-chief of Tygodnik Solidarność.

== Career ==
In 2003, Świątek graduated in political science from the Faculty of Social and Economics of the Cardinal Stefan Wyszyński University in Warsaw. In 2000–2001 he collaborated with the daily Życie. In the years 2003–2016 Świątek was employed in the editorial office of Tygodnik Solidarność. In 2009–2010 he was the head of the Social and Trade Union Department, in 2010–2015 deputy editor-in-chief, and in 2015–2016 editor-in-chief. In the years 2015–2020 he hosted the current affairs programmes Minęła dwudziesta, Minęła 8 and Forum on TVP Info. In 2017 he started working at Polish Radio. He headed the editorial office of Polskie Radio 24. He hosted the Debate of the Day program. Since July 2019, he has been a co-host of Sygnały Dnia (morning radio show) on Polskie Radio Program I. Since December 2022, he has hosted the W samo południe program. He also collaborated with Radio Gdańsk, hosting the program Śniadanie polityków (Politicians' Breakfast). From February to December 2023, Krzysztof Świątek was the director of Polskie Radio 24. He was a commentator on political events for TV Republika.

As a specialist in contemporary history, Świątek leads debates organized by the Institute of National Remembrance and moderates the series of talks Historia toczy się dziś (History is happening today) on the IPNtv channel on YouTube.

In 2009 and 2014 Świątek received an award from the National Labor Inspectorate for promoting the issue of safety in employment. In 2014, the Association of Polish Journalists honored him with a distinction in the Watergate Awards category for his article "Deale w Generalnej Dyrekcji".

== Selected publications ==
Świątek is the author of several hundred articles and reportage series. Many of them were published in book form in collected editions.

- 2009 – Polska i Solidarność. 20 lat przemian. Jak wykorzystaliśmy odzyskaną wolność (author of a number of interviews; work edited by Ewa Elżbieta Zarzycka)
- 2014 – Okopy Świętej Trójcy: rozmowy o życiu i ludziach. Z Markiem Nowakowskim rozmawia Krzysztof Świątek (interviews with Marek Nowakowski)
- 2015 – Solidarność. Kronika lat walki 1980–2015 (with Jerzy Kłosiński and Ewa Elżbieta Zarzycka)
