= Juliusz Petry =

Polish writer and radio director

Juliusz Petry (1889–1961), was a Polish writer, and radio director; he was the first director of Polish Radio in Lwów and Wilno and, after World War II, in Wrocław. He co-organized the re-launch of Polish Television, and was the author of numerous radio programs.
