= 2022–23 III liga =

III liga
- Season: 2022–23
- Dates: 5 August 2022 – 17 June 2023
- Champions: ŁKS Łódź II; Olimpia Grudziądz; Polonia Bytom; Stal Stalowa Wola
- Matches: 1,224
- Goals: 3,857 (3.15 per match)
- Top goalscorer: (Poland) Dawid Wolny (26 goals)

The 2022–23 III liga season was the 15th edition of the fourth tier domestic division in the Polish football league system since its establishment in 2008 under its current title (III liga) and the 7th season under its current league division format. The league was operated by the Polish Football Association (PZPN).

The competition was contested by 72 clubs split geographically across 4 groups of 18 teams, with the winners of each group gaining promotion to the II liga. The season was played in a round-robin tournament. It began on 5 August 2022 and ended on 17 June 2023. The teams included semi-professional clubs (although a few are professional) and the reserve teams of professional clubs.

== Format ==
Geographical criteria.

72 teams were divided into four groups according to geographical criteria:

- Group I (Łódź – Masovian – Podlaskie – Warmian-Masurian)
- Group II (Kuyavian-Pomeranian – Greater Poland – Pomeranian – West Pomeranian)
- Group III (Lower Silesian – Lubusz – Opole – Silesian)
- Group IV (Świętokrzyskie – Lesser Poland – Lublin – Podkarpackie)

Since 2021–22 season each group of III liga was operated by Polish Football Association (PZPN), not a different voivodship football association.

Location of teams and stadiums in 2022–23 III liga. Red: Group I, Green: Group II, Yellow: Group III, Blue: Group IV

== Changes from last season ==
The following teams have changed division since the 2021–22 season.

=== To III liga ===
Relegated from 2021–22 II liga	▼ Pogoń Grodzisk Mazowiecki ▼ Sokół Ostróda	Promoted from 2021–22 IV liga	Group 1 ▲ Warta Sieradz ▲ Mławianka Mława ▲ Olimpia Zambrów ▲ Concordia Elbląg	Group 2 ▲ Unia Solec Kujawski ▲ Gedania Gdańsk ▲ Unia Swarzędz ▲ Vineta Wolin	Group 3 ▲ Chrobry II Głogów ▲ Stilon Gorzów Wielkopolski ▲ Polonia Nysa ▲ Raków II Częstochowa	Group 4 ▲Lublinianka Lublin ▲ Wieczysta Kraków ▲KS Wiązownica ▲ Korona II Kielce

=== From III liga ===
Promoted to 2022–23 II liga	▲ Polonia Warsaw ▲ Kotwica Kołobrzeg ▲ Zagłębie II Lubin ▲ Siarka Tarnobrzeg	Relegated to 2022–23 IV liga	Group 1 ▼KS Kutno ▼ Mamry Giżycko ▼GKS Wikielec ▼ Znicz Biała Piska ▼ Sokół Aleksandrów Łódzki ▼ Wissa Szczuczyn	Group 2 ▼ Bałtyk Koszalin ▼ Elana Toruń	Group 3 ▼ Piast Żmigród ▼ Karkonosze Jelenia Góra ▼ Foto-Higiena Gać	Group 4 ▼ Korona Rzeszów ▼ Tomasovia Tomaszów Lubelski ▼ Wólczanka Wólka Pełkińska

== League tables ==
=== Group 1 ===
III liga Group 1
- Season: 2022–23
- Dates: 6 August 2022 – 17 June 2023
- Champions: ŁKS Łódź II
- Relegated: Sokół Ostróda; Błonianka Błonie; Ursus Warsaw
- Matches: 306
- Goals: 993 (3.25 per match)
- Top goalscorer: (Poland) Mateusz Stryjewski (21 goals)

Pos	Team	Pld	W	D	L	GF	GA	GD	Pts	Promotion
1	ŁKS Łódź II (C, P)	34	20	8	6	76	41	+35	68	Promotion to II liga
2	Legionovia Legionowo	34	18	10	6	71	43	+28	64	
3	Pogoń Grodzisk Mazowiecki	34	18	10	6	62	39	+23	64	
4	Świt Nowy Dwór Mazowiecki	34	18	7	9	66	45	+21	61	
5	Legia Warsaw II	34	15	10	9	66	48	+18	55	
6	Lechia Tomaszów Mazowiecki	34	15	10	9	51	43	+8	55	
7	Unia Skierniewice	34	15	8	11	41	38	+3	53	
8	Mławianka Mława	34	15	7	12	83	71	+12	52	
9	Jagiellonia Białystok II	34	13	10	11	65	54	+11	49	
10	Pilica Białobrzegi	34	12	9	13	53	55	−2	45	
11	Pelikan Łowicz	34	12	9	13	56	52	+4	45	
12	Sokół Ostróda (Note: Sokół Ostróda withdrawn the league after the season.) (W)	34	10	6	18	49	71	−22	36	Withdrawal
13	Olimpia Zambrów	34	9	9	16	40	63	−23	36	
14	Broń Radom	34	9	8	17	60	76	−16	35	
15	Wisła Sieradz	34	8	10	16	39	53	−14	34	
16	Concordia Elbląg	34	8	9	17	38	61	−23	33	
17	Błonianka Błonie (R)	34	8	6	20	35	68	−33	30	Relegation to IV liga
18	Ursus Warsaw (R)	34	5	10	19	42	72	−30	25	Relegation to IV liga

Source: 90minut.pl
Rules for classification: 1. Number of points reached in the entire series of games; 2. Number of points reached in direct matches; 3. Goal difference in direct matches; 4. Goal difference in direct matches – away goals counted twice; 5. Goal difference in the whole series of games; 6. Number of goals scored in the entire series of games.
(C) Champions; (P) Promoted; (R) Relegated; (W) ?

=== Group 2 ===
III liga Group 2
- Season: 2022–23
- Dates: 5 August 2022 – 17 June 2023
- Champions: Olimpia Grudziądz
- Relegated: Jarota Jarocin; Bałtyk Gdynia; Unia Janikowo
- Matches: 306
- Goals: 899 (2.94 per match)
- Top goalscorer: (Poland) Bartosz Bartkowiak (17 goals)

Pos	Team	Pld	W	D	L	GF	GA	GD	Pts	Promotion
1	Olimpia Grudziądz (C, P)	34	23	7	4	73	18	+55	76	Promotion to II liga
2	Pogoń Szczecin II	34	20	9	5	69	25	+44	69	
3	Polonia Środa Wielkopolska	34	20	4	10	75	54	+21	64	
4	Zawisza Bydgoszcz	34	19	5	10	69	45	+24	62	
5	Gedania Gdańsk	34	19	4	11	63	59	+4	61	
6	KP Starogard Gdański	34	17	8	9	44	35	+9	59	
7	Świt Szczecin	34	16	7	11	61	41	+20	55	
8	Pogoń Nowe Skalmierzyce	34	16	6	12	51	46	+5	54	
9	Sokół Kleczew	34	14	5	15	53	48	+5	47	
10	Unia Swąrzedz	34	11	11	12	37	42	−5	44	
11	Cartusia Kartuzy (Note: GKS Przodkowo has been rebranded as Cartusia Kartuzy.)	34	11	10	13	37	40	−3	43	
12	Błękitni Stargard	34	10	12	12	46	45	+1	42	
13	Stolem Gniewino	34	9	9	16	33	52	−19	36	
14	Unia Solec Kujawski	34	9	8	17	40	59	−19	35	
15	Vineta Wolin	34	8	11	15	47	66	−19	35	
16	Jarota Jarocin (R)	34	9	6	19	41	69	−28	33	Relegation to IV liga
17	Bałtyk Gdynia (R)	34	8	4	22	43	70	−27	28	Relegation to IV liga
18	Unia Janikowo (Note: Unia Janikowo withdrawn the league after the first half of the season.) (W)	34	2	4	28	17	85	−68	10	Withdrawal

Source: 90minut.pl
Rules for classification: 1. Number of points reached in the entire series of games; 2. Number of points reached in direct matches; 3. Goal difference in direct matches; 4. Goal difference in direct matches – away goals counted twice; 5. Goal difference in the whole series of games; 6. Number of goals scored in the entire series of games.
(C) Champions; (P) Promoted; (R) Relegated; (W) Withdrawn

=== Group 3 ===
III liga Group 3
- Season: 2022–23
- Dates: 6 August 2022 – 17 June 2023
- Champions: Polonia Bytom
- Relegated: Stal Brzeg; Polonia Nysa; Miedź Legnica II; Odra Wodzisław Śląski; Chrobry II Głogów
- Matches: 306
- Goals: 996 (3.25 per match)
- Top goalscorer: (Poland) Dawid Wolny (26 goals)

Pos	Team	Pld	W	D	L	GF	GA	GD	Pts	Promotion
1	Polonia Bytom (C, P)	34	24	3	7	69	34	+35	75	Promotion to II liga
2	Raków II Częstochowa	34	19	8	7	64	34	+30	65	
3	Rekord Bielsko-Biała	34	19	8	7	69	42	+27	65	
4	Ślęza Wrocław	34	19	3	12	73	55	+18	60	
5	Carina Gubin	34	16	6	12	47	45	+2	54	
6	Górnik Zabrze II	34	15	6	13	68	61	+7	51	
7	Gwarek Tarnowskie Góry	34	14	9	11	60	52	+8	51	
8	MKS Kluczbork	34	14	6	14	61	55	+6	48	
9	Lechia Zielona Góra	34	12	11	11	51	51	0	47	
10	LKS Goczałkowice-Zdrój	34	12	10	12	41	43	−2	46	
11	Pniówek Pawłowice	34	12	10	12	64	60	+4	46	
12	Stilon Gorzów Wielkopolski	34	13	5	16	50	62	−12	44	
13	Warta Gorzów Wielkopolski	34	11	10	13	42	56	−14	43	
14	Stal Brzeg (R)	34	10	7	17	51	75	−24	37	Relegation to IV liga
15	Polonia Nysa (R)	34	8	12	14	42	50	−8	36	Relegation to IV liga
16	Miedź Legnica II (R)	34	7	9	18	45	63	−18	30	Relegation to IV liga
17	Odra Wodzisław Śląski (R)	34	7	7	20	57	88	−31	28	Relegation to IV liga
18	Chrobry II Głogów (R)	34	7	4	23	42	70	−28	25	Relegation to IV liga

Source: 90minut.pl
Rules for classification: 1. Number of points reached in the entire series of games; 2. Number of points reached in direct matches; 3. Goal difference in direct matches; 4. Goal difference in direct matches – away goals counted twice; 5. Goal difference in the whole series of games; 6. Number of goals scored in the entire series of games.
(C) Champions; (P) Promoted; (R) Relegated

=== Group 4 ===
III liga Group 4
- Season: 2022–23
- Dates: 6 August 2022 – 17 June 2023
- Champions: Stal Stalowa Wola
- Relegated: Cracovia II; Korona II Kielce; Wisła Sandomierz; Lublinianka Lublin; ŁKS Łagów
- Matches: 306
- Goals: 969 (3.17 per match)
- Top goalscorer: (Poland) Hubert Antkowiak (19 goals)
- Highest attendance: 3,764; Stal 7–0 Wisła (10 June 2023)

Pos	Team	Pld	W	D	L	GF	GA	GD	Pts	Promotion
1	Stal Stalowa Wola	34	23	5	6	72	27	+45	74	Promotion to II liga
2	Avia Świdnik	34	19	11	4	58	26	+32	68	
3	Wieczysta Kraków	34	20	7	7	75	35	+40	67	
4	KSZO Ostrowiec Świętokrzyski	34	17	7	10	61	36	+25	58	
5	Podlasie Biała Podlaska	34	14	13	7	63	42	+21	55	
6	Cracovia II (Note: Cracovia II withdrawn the league after the season. In result the 14th place, KS Wiązownica, stays in III liga.) (W)	34	16	6	12	69	48	+21	54	Withdrawal
7	Wisłoka Dębica	34	15	7	12	54	46	+8	52	
8	Sokół Sieniawa	34	14	6	14	57	65	−8	48	
9	Czarni Połaniec	34	15	2	17	47	58	−11	47	
10	Podhale Nowy Targ	34	13	6	15	59	47	+12	45	
11	Orlęta Radzyń Podlaski	36	13	6	17	44	63	−19	45	
12	Chełmianka Chełm	34	10	10	14	45	47	−2	40	
13	Unia Tarnów	34	10	10	14	43	66	−23	40	
14	KS Wiązownica	34	11	7	16	49	59	−10	40	
15	Korona II Kielce (R)	34	10	9	15	63	58	+5	39	Relegation to IV liga
16	Wisła Sandomierz (R)	34	7	6	21	40	91	−51	27	Relegation to IV liga
17	Lublinianka Lublin (R)	34	7	2	25	43	92	−49	23	Relegation to IV liga
18	ŁKS Łagów (Note: ŁKS Łagów withdrawn the league after the first half of the season.) (W)	34	11	4	19	27	63	−36	37	Withdrawal

Updated to match(es) played on 5 December 2020. Source: 90minut.pl
Rules for classification: 1. Number of points reached in the entire series of games; 2. Number of points reached in direct matches; 3. Goal difference in direct matches; 4. Goal difference in direct matches – away goals counted twice; 5. Goal difference in the whole series of games; 6. Number of goals scored in the entire series of games.
(R) Relegated; (W) Withdrawn

== See also ==
- 2022–23 Ekstraklasa
- 2022–23 I liga
- 2022–23 II liga
- 2022–23 Polish Cup
