= 2022–23 II liga =

II liga
- Season: 2022–23
- Dates: 16 July 2022 – 11 June 2023
- Champions: Polonia Warsaw
- Promoted: Polonia Warsaw; Znicz Pruszków; Motor Lublin
- Relegated: Śląsk Wrocław II; Garbarnia Kraków; Siarka Tarnobrzeg; Górnik Polkowice
- Matches played: 306
- Goals scored: 845 (2.76 per match)
- Top goalscorer: Maciej Firlej (21 goals)
- Biggest home win: Hutnik 6–0 Siarka (7 August 2022)
- Biggest away win: Hutnik 1–5 Kotwica (14 August 2022); Motor 2–6 Wisła (18 September 2022); Lech II 0–4 Śląsk II (9 October 2022); Jastrzębie 0–4 Wisła (5 November 2022); Zagłębie II 0–4 Stomil (13 November 2022); Zagłębie II 1–5 Znicz (5 March 2023); Lech II 0–4 Kalisz (23 April 2023)
- Highest scoring: Stomil 6–2 Zagłębie II (24 July 2022); Motor 2–6 Wisła (18 September 2022); Garbarnia 4–4 Jastrzębie (15 October 2022)
- Longest winning run: 9 matches Kotwica Kołobrzeg
- Longest unbeaten run: 16 matches Polonia Warsaw; Stomil Olsztyn
- Longest winless run: 11 matches Zagłębie Lubin II
- Longest losing run: 8 matches Zagłębie Lubin II
- Highest attendance: 5,053; Polonia 1–1 Motor (4 June 2023)
- Lowest attendance: 0 (Note: Matches have been played behind closed doors without any spectators.); 10 matches
- Total attendance: 284,317
- Average attendance: 961 (Note: Average attendance without matches played behind closed doors without any spectators.) ▼13.7% 929 (Note: Average attendance from all games played.) ▼11.7%

The 2022–23 II liga (also known as eWinner II liga due to sponsorship reasons) is the 75th season of the third tier domestic division in the Polish football league system since its establishment in 1948 and the 15th season of the Polish II liga under its current title. The league is operated by the Polish Football Association.

The league is contested by 18 teams. The regular season is played in a round-robin tournament. The season started on 16 July 2022 and will conclude on 3 June 2023 (regular season).

== Teams ==
A total of 18 teams participate in the 2022–23 II liga season.

=== Changes from last season ===
The following teams have changed division since the 2021–22 season.

==== To II liga ====
Relegated from 2021–22 I liga	Promoted from 2021–22 III liga
▼ Stomil Olsztyn ▼ Górnik Polkowice ▼GKS Jastrzębie	▲ Polonia Warsaw (Group 1) ▲ Kotwica Kołobrzeg (Group 2) ▲ Zagłębie II Lubin (Group 3) ▲ Siarka Tarnobrzeg (Group 4)

==== From II liga ====
Promoted to 2022–23 I liga	Relegated to 2022–23 III liga
▲ Stal Rzeszów ▲ Chojniczanka Chojnice ▲ Ruch Chorzów	▼ Wigry Suwałki (relegated to IV liga) ▼ Pogoń Grodzisk Mazowiecki ▼ Sokół Ostróda ▼GKS Bełchatów (dissolved)

=== Stadiums and locations ===
Location of teams in 2021–22 II liga.

Note: Table lists in alphabetical order.

Team	Location	Stadium	Capacity
Garbarnia Kraków	Kraków	Stadion RKS Garbarnia	963
GKS Jastrzębie	Jastrzębie-Zdrój	Stadion Miejski	5,650
Górnik Polkowice	Polkowice	Stadion Miejski	4,325
Hutnik Kraków	Kraków	Stadion Suche Stawy	6,500
KKS 1925 Kalisz	Kalisz	Stadion OSRiR	8,166
Kotwica Kołobrzeg	Kołobrzeg	Stadion im. Sebastiana Karpiniuka	3,014
Lech Poznań II	Poznań	Stadion Amiki Wronki	5,296
Motor Lublin	Lublin	Arena Lublin	15,400
Olimpia Elbląg	Elbląg	Stadion Miejski	3,000
Pogoń Siedlce	Siedlce	Stadion ROSRRiT	2,901
Polonia Warsaw	Warsaw	Stadion im. gen. Kazimierza Sosnkowskiego	7,150
Radunia Stężyca	Stężyca	Arena Radunia	950
Siarka Tarnobrzeg	Tarnobrzeg	Stadion Miejski	3,770
Stomil Olsztyn	Olsztyn	Stadion OSiR	4,200
Śląsk Wrocław II	Wrocław	Stadion Oporowska	8,346
Wisła Puławy	Puławy	Stadion MOSiR	4,418
Zagłębie II Lubin	Lubin	Stadion Zagłębia Lubin	16,032
Znicz Pruszków	Pruszków	Stadion MZOS	1,977

== League table ==
Pos	Team	Pld	W	D	L	GF	GA	GD	Pts	Promotion or Relegation
1	Polonia Warsaw (C, P)	34	18	11	5	57	36	+21	65	Promotion to I liga
2	Znicz Pruszków (P)	34	18	5	11	49	37	+12	59	Promotion to I liga
3	Kotwica Kołobrzeg	34	17	8	9	45	33	+12	59	Qualification for Promotion play-offs
4	Stomil Olsztyn	34	14	15	5	51	32	+19	57	Qualification for Promotion play-offs
5	Wisła Puławy	34	16	8	10	56	38	+18	56	Qualification for Promotion play-offs
6	Motor Lublin (O, P)	34	15	10	9	52	37	+15	55	Qualification for Promotion play-offs
7	KKS 1925 Kalisz	34	15	9	10	63	45	+18	54	
8	Pogoń Siedlce	34	13	9	12	41	42	−1	48	
9	Olimpia Elbląg	34	12	11	11	40	36	+4	47	
10	GKS Jastrzębie	34	13	8	13	41	45	−4	47	
11	Lech II Poznań	34	10	12	12	45	60	−15	42	
12	Hutnik Kraków	34	10	10	14	41	48	−7	40	
13	Radunia Stężyca	34	10	9	15	47	57	−10	39	
14	Zagłębie II Lubin	34	11	5	18	44	68	−24	38	
15	Górnik Polkowice (R)	34	10	7	17	46	52	−6	37	Relegation to III liga
16	Siarka Tarnobrzeg (R)	34	8	9	17	37	57	−20	33	Relegation to III liga
17	Garbarnia Kraków (R)	34	9	5	20	52	65	−13	32	Relegation to III liga
18	Śląsk II Wrocław (R)	34	8	7	19	38	57	−19	31	Relegation to III liga

Source: 90minut.pl
Rules for classification: 1) Points; 2) Head-to-head points; 3) Head-to-head goal difference; 4) Goal difference; 6) Goals scored; 7) Number of wins; 8) Number of away wins. (Note: Head-to-head record is used only after all the matches between the teams in question have been played)
(C) Champions; (O) Play-off winner; (P) Promoted; (R) Relegated

== Positions by round ==
Team ╲ Round	1	2	3	4	5	6	7	8	9	10	11	12	13	14	15	16	17	18	19	20	21	22	23	24	25	26	27	28	29	30	31	32	33	34
Garbarnia Kraków	8	16	8	11	6	11	13	14	9	11	10	11	12	12	11	14	17	18	16	18	18	14	15	15	14	17	17	14	16	17	18	18	18	17
GKS Jastrzębie	3	9	10	5	7	9	12	7	8	8	8	6	8	6	5	8	8	8	9	12	12	11	12	10	11	10	11	10	11	11	10	10	10	10
Górnik Polkowice	3	1	1	1	2	2	7	11	11	10	9	10	11	14	10	11	10	11	8	11	11	13	13	14	16	16	14	15	14	14	15	15	14	15
Hutnik Kraków	2	8	9	4	8	13	15	15	17	16	16	17	18	18	18	18	15	16	17	13	13	15	14	13	13	13	13	12	10	10	12	12	12	12
KKS 1925 Kalisz	12	5	6	8	4	4	2	2	2	2	3	5	4	3	2	3	3	2	2	2	2	2	1	2	4	5	5	5	6	5	6	6	5	7
Kotwica Kołobrzeg	10	4	2	2	1	1	1	1	1	1	1	1	1	1	1	1	1	1	1	1	1	1	2	1	2	2	2	4	3	3	2	2	2	3
Lech II Poznań	14	13	14	16	17	17	16	16	15	14	13	15	15	16	16	12	11	13	10	8	10	10	9	9	9	9	9	11	12	12	11	11	11	11
Motor Lublin	8	12	17	18	18	18	17	17	16	18	18	18	17	17	17	13	13	12	11	10	8	8	8	8	8	8	6	7	7	7	7	7	6	6
Olimpia Elbląg	15	14	15	9	5	5	3	4	4	6	7	7	6	7	7	6	5	5	6	6	7	7	6	4	5	7	8	8	8	8	8	9	8	9
Pogoń Siedlce	15	7	11	13	11	8	11	13	13	15	15	16	16	13	15	17	18	15	12	9	9	9	11	11	12	12	10	9	9	9	9	8	9	8
Polonia Warsaw	12	18	18	15	16	14	14	9	6	5	5	3	2	2	3	2	2	3	3	3	3	4	4	3	1	1	1	1	1	1	1	1	1	1
Radunia Stężyca	6	15	16	17	13	12	5	8	10	12	14	13	10	10	13	10	12	9	13	14	14	12	10	12	10	11	12	13	13	13	14	14	13	13
Siarka Tarnobrzeg	1	3	5	12	15	16	18	18	18	17	17	14	13	15	14	16	16	14	15	17	15	16	17	17	17	18	18	16	18	18	17	17	17	16
Stomil Olsztyn	10	2	4	6	14	7	9	12	12	13	11	9	9	9	9	7	6	6	4	4	4	6	7	6	6	3	3	2	2	2	3	3	3	4
Śląsk II Wrocław	6	16	7	10	10	15	10	10	14	9	12	12	14	11	12	15	14	17	18	16	17	18	18	18	18	14	15	17	15	16	16	16	16	18
Wisła Puławy	15	6	3	3	3	6	6	5	7	7	6	2	5	4	4	4	4	4	5	5	6	5	5	7	7	6	7	6	5	6	5	4	7	5
Zagłębie II Lubin	5	11	13	14	12	10	4	3	3	3	4	8	7	8	8	9	9	10	14	15	16	17	16	16	15	15	16	18	17	15	13	13	15	14
Znicz Pruszków	18	10	12	7	9	3	8	6	5	4	2	4	3	5	6	5	7	7	7	7	5	3	3	5	3	4	4	3	4	4	4	5	4	2

II liga champion Promotion to I liga
Promotion to I liga
Qualification for Promotion play-offs
Relegation to III liga

Source: 90minut.pl

== Results ==
Home \ Away	GAR	JAS	GPO	HUT	KAL	KOT	LP2	MOT	ELB	PSI	PWA	RAD	SIA	STO	ŚL2	WPU	ZA2	ZNI
Garbarnia Kraków	—	4–4	3–1	4–2	3–0	0–1	0–1	2–2	1–2	3–2	1–3	3–1	0–1	1–1	3–1	4–1	0–1	2–3
GKS Jastrzębie	3–1	—	0–2	0–1	1–1	1–0	0–1	2–1	0–2	3–1	1–2	4–0	3–1	1–1	1–0	0–4	3–1	1–0
Górnik Polkowice	2–1	4–0	—	1–0	1–3	0–1	3–3	2–0	3–4	1–2	2–0	0–1	4–1	0–0	1–3	1–0	3–0	1–2
Hutnik Kraków	1–0	0–0	3–1	—	0–1	1–5	3–2	1–3	2–1	0–0	1–4	1–3	6–0	1–1	2–0	2–2	1–0	0–1
KKS 1925 Kalisz	3–1	2–0	2–2	2–1	—	4–1	2–2	0–1	0–0	3–2	3–0	5–1	2–2	2–2	3–0	0–1	5–2	1–3
Kotwica Kołobrzeg	3–0	1–0	1–0	0–0	0–0	—	3–1	0–0	2–0	1–1	1–2	1–2	3–2	0–0	1–1	2–1	2–0	2–1
Lech II Poznań	3–0	1–1	2–2	1–1	0–4	2–3	—	2–0	0–0	1–2	1–3	1–0	1–1	0–3	0–4	1–1	2–1	2–2
Motor Lublin	3–0	2–1	3–1	1–1	0–3	3–1	5–1	—	1–1	4–1	0–1	3–1	0–0	1–0	3–0	2–6	2–0	0–0
Olimpia Elbląg	3–2	0–1	0–1	0–1	2–2	2–0	0–1	1–1	—	1–1	0–2	3–1	2–2	4–0	2–1	2–1	0–1	2–1
Pogoń Siedlce	3–0	1–1	3–2	0–0	2–1	0–0	3–0	2–1	0–1	—	2–1	0–1	1–2	0–0	1–0	1–1	1–0	3–4
Polonia Warsaw	1–1	1–1	3–0	1–0	3–2	1–1	3–3	1–1	2–0	0–1	—	3–2	3–1	1–1	2–1	0–0	1–1	1–1
Radunia Stężyca	0–2	4–2	2–2	2–1	0–0	1–2	3–3	1–1	2–2	2–1	2–3	—	4–0	0–0	3–3	0–0	1–1	0–1
Siarka Tarnobrzeg	3–2	0–0	2–0	1–1	1–2	1–2	0–1	0–2	1–0	1–2	1–3	0–2	—	0–1	1–0	2–4	2–3	4–0
Stomil Olsztyn	2–2	2–0	2–1	4–3	0–1	1–0	2–2	2–1	0–0	4–0	1–1	3–2	1–1	—	1–0	0–3	6–2	0–0
Śląsk II Wrocław	2–3	2–1	2–1	0–0	2–0	0–2	1–2	1–1	1–1	1–0	1–1	0–1	0–0	0–3	—	1–2	4–3	1–3
Wisła Puławy	3–2	0–1	0–0	3–1	3–1	2–1	3–1	1–0	1–0	1–2	0–2	1–0	0–0	2–1	4–0	—	1–2	1–2
Zagłębie II Lubin	1–0	1–2	1–1	4–2	4–3	0–1	1–0	0–2	1–1	1–0	1–2	2–1	2–1	0–4	3–4	3–3	—	1–5
Znicz Pruszków	2–1	1–2	2–0	0–1	2–0	3–1	0–1	1–2	0–1	0–0	1–0	3–1	0–2	0–2	2–1	1–0	2–0	—

Source: 90minut.pl
Legend: Blue = home team win; Yellow = draw; Red = away team win.
For upcoming matches, an "a" indicates there is an article about the rivalry between the two participants.

== Results by round ==
Team ╲ Round	1	2	3	4	5	6	7	8	9	10	11	12	13	14	15	16	17	18	19	20	21	22	23	24	25	26	27	28	29	30	31	32	33	34
Garbarnia	D	L	W	D	W	L	L	L	W	L	W	L	L	D	D	L	L	L	W	L	D	W	L	W	L	L	L	W	L	L	L	L	L	W
Jastrzębie	W	L	D	W	D	D	L	W	L	D	W	W	D	W	D	L	L	L	W	L	L	W	L	W	D	W	L	W	L	L	W	W	D	W
Polkowice	W	W	W	D	L	L	L	L	D	D	W	L	L	L	W	L	W	L	W	L	L	L	D	L	L	D	W	L	W	D	L	D	W	L
Hutnik	W	L	D	W	L	L	L	L	L	W	L	L	L	D	L	W	W	D	D	W	D	L	D	W	L	W	W	W	D	L	D	D	D	L
KKS Kalisz	W	D	D	W	D	W	W	W	L	D	L	L	W	W	W	D	W	W	L	D	W	L	W	D	L	L	L	W	L	W	D	D	W	L
Kotwica	D	W	W	W	W	W	W	W	W	W	D	L	W	W	L	D	D	L	D	L	W	L	D	W	L	L	W	L	W	W	W	D	L	D
Lech II Poznań	L	D	D	L	L	L	W	D	D	W	D	D	L	L	W	W	D	D	W	W	L	W	D	W	W	D	L	L	L	L	W	D	D	L
Motor	D	D	L	L	L	L	W	D	D	L	L	W	D	D	W	W	L	W	D	W	W	W	W	L	W	W	W	L	D	W	W	D	W	D
Elbląg	L	D	D	W	W	D	W	D	W	L	D	D	W	D	L	W	W	W	D	D	D	D	W	W	L	L	L	L	W	L	L	L	W	L
Siedlce	L	D	D	D	W	D	W	W	W	D	W	W	D	D	W	W	W	L	L	D	W	L	D	W	W	W	W	W	D	W	D	W	L	D
Polonia	L	D	D	D	W	D	W	W	W	D	W	W	D	D	W	W	W	L	L	D	W	L	D	W	W	W	W	W	D	W	W	W	L	D
Radunia	D	L	D	L	W	W	W	W	L	L	L	D	W	D	L	W	L	W	L	L	D	W	W	L	W	D	L	L	L	D	L	D	W	D
Siarka	W	D	L	L	D	L	L	L	L	W	D	W	D	L	W	L	D	W	L	D	D	L	L	L	L	L	W	W	L	L	D	L	D	W
Stomil	D	W	D	D	L	W	L	L	D	D	W	W	D	L	W	W	W	W	W	D	D	D	D	W	D	W	W	W	D	W	L	D	D	D
Śląsk II Wrocław	D	L	W	D	L	D	W	D	L	W	L	L	L	W	L	L	D	L	D	W	L	L	L	L	W	W	L	L	W	L	L	L	D	L
Puławy	L	W	W	W	L	L	D	W	L	D	W	W	D	W	W	L	D	W	D	D	D	W	D	L	L	W	L	W	W	L	W	W	L	W
Zagłębie II Lubin	W	L	L	L	W	W	W	W	W	L	L	L	W	D	L	L	L	L	L	L	L	L	D	L	W	D	L	L	D	W	W	D	L	W
Znicz	L	W	L	W	D	W	L	W	D	W	W	L	W	L	L	W	L	L	W	W	W	W	W	L	W	L	W	D	D	W	L	D	W	W

Source: 90minut.pl
W = Win; D = Draw; L = Loss

== Promotion play-offs ==
II liga play-offs for the 2022–23 season will be played on 7 and 11 June 2023. The teams who finished in 3rd, 4th, 5th and 6th place are set to compete. The fixtures are determined by final league position – 3rd team of regular season vs 6th team of regular season and 4th team of regular season vs 5th team of regular season. The winner of final match will be promoted to the I liga for next season. All matches will be played in a stadiums of team which occupied higher position in regular season.

Semi-finals; 7 June 2023
3	Kotwica Kołobrzeg	1
6	Motor Lublin	2
4	Stomil Olsztyn	3
5	Wisła Puławy	1

Final; 11 June 2023
6	Motor Lublin	1(4)
4	Stomil Olsztyn	1(1)

=== Matches ===
==== Semi-finals ====
7 June 2023
20:30 CEST

Kotwica Kołobrzeg	1–2 (a.e.t.)	Motor Lublin
Łysiak 84' (pen.)		Ceglarz 90'; Kasprzyk 116'

Stadion im. Sebastiana Karpiniuka, Kołobrzeg
Attendance: 2,520
Referee: Bartosz Frankowski (Toruń)
7 June 2023
17:45 CEST

Stomil Olsztyn	3–1	Wisła Puławy
Żwir 16'; Stromecki 26'; Sadowski 74'	Report	Paluchowski 58'

Stadion Miejski, Olsztyn
Attendance: 2,401
Referee: Daniel Stefański (Bydgoszcz)

==== Final ====
11 June 2023
15:30 CEST

Stomil Olsztyn	1–1 (a.e.t.)	Motor Lublin
Żwir 67'	Report	Wójcik 37'
Penalties
Kurbiel (penalty missed); Shibata (penalty scored); Caetano (penalty missed)	1–4	(penalty scored) Król; (penalty scored) Rozmus; (penalty scored) Wójcik; (penalty scored) Żebrakowski

Stadion Miejski, Olsztyn
Attendance: 4,517
Referee: Jarosław Przybył (Kluczbork)

== Season statistics ==
=== Top goalscorers ===
Rank	Player	Club	Goals
1	(Poland) Maciej Firlej	Znicz Pruszków	21
2	(Poland) Damian Nowak	Pogoń Siedlce	18
3	(Poland) Adrian Paluchowski	Wisła Puławy	15
3	(Poland) Daniel Stanclik	GKS Jastrzębie	15
5	(Poland) Piotr Giel	KKS 1925 Kalisz	14
6	(Spain) Néstor Gordillo	KKS 1925 Kalisz	13
6	(Poland) Krzysztof Świątek	Hutnik Kraków	13
6	(Poland) Filip Wilak	Lech II Poznań	13
9	(Poland) Michał Fidziukiewicz	Polonia Warsaw	11
9	(Poland) Rafał Król	Motor Lublin	11
11	(Poland) Wojciech Fadecki	Polonia Warsaw	10
11	(Poland) Piotr Kurbiel	Stomil Olsztyn	10
11	(Poland) Arkadiusz Piech	Górnik Polkowice	10
14	(Ghana) Mark Assinor	Hutnik Kraków; Garbarnia Kraków	9

== See also ==
- 2022–23 Ekstraklasa
- 2022–23 I liga
- 2022–23 III liga
- 2022–23 Polish Cup
- 2022 Polish Super Cup
