= Polish Radio Łuck =

Polish Radio Łuck (Polish: Polskie Radio Łuck) was a radio station of the Polish Radio, planned to be opened in autumn of 1939 in the Volhynian city of Łuck (now Lutsk, Ukraine). Construction of the station's campus, together with the studio, began in July 1938. Frequency of the station was 424 kHz, and power - 50 kilowatts. By September 1, 1939 (see Polish September Campaign), all works in Łuck were completed, and the station was ready, waiting for the transmitter to be brought from Warsaw. However, the transmitter was still being built by Workshops of the Department of Construction of the Polish Radio, located in Warsaw's district of Mokotów, and it was not completed by the outbreak of the war. Therefore, Polish Radio station in Łuck never began service.

The station building survives and is located today at 52 Podebni Street (50.728187°N 25.3051864°E).

== See also ==
- Radio stations in interwar Poland
