= Emanuel Schlechter =

Polish-Jewish artist and writer

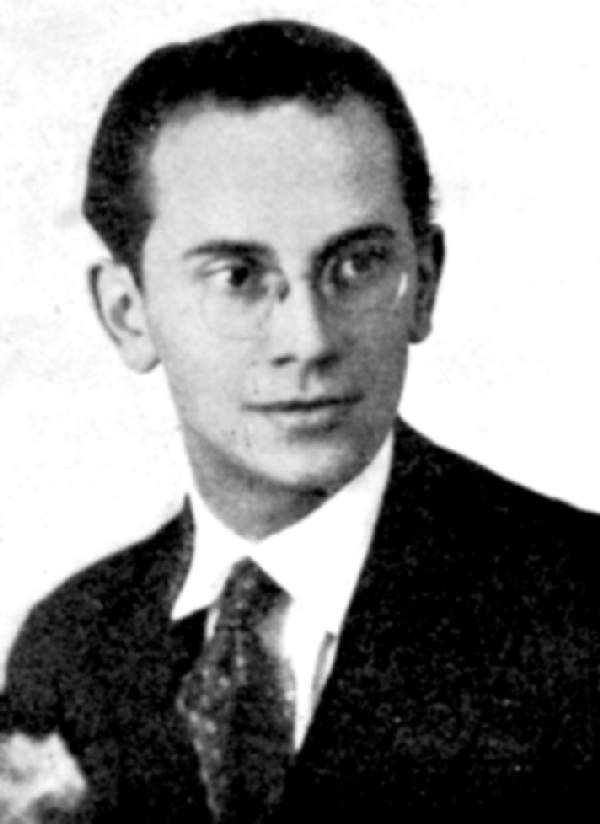
- Born: October 9, 1904; Lemburg, Kingdom of Galicia and Lodomeria
- Died: 1943 (aged 38–39); Janowska concentration camp, District of Galicia, General Government
- Other names: Eman; Olgierd Lech
- Education: Uniwersytet Jana Kazimierza
- Organization: Volunteer Army (Poland)

Emanuel Schlechter (born 9 October 1904, Lwów – died November 11, 1943, also: Szlechter, Olgierd Lech) was a Polish-Jewish artist, lyricist, screenwriter, librettist, writer, satirist, translator, composer and director, and occasional actor. He was one of the most influential creators of interwar Polish popular music in the 1930s, whose songs became deeply embedded in Polish language and culture. He was also a member of the "Tango of Death", according to Simon Wiesenthal, a fellow internee at the Janowska concentration camp.

== Biography ==
Emanuel Schlechter was born in Lwów, then part of Austria-Hungary and later interwar Poland, into a Polonized Jewish family. His father, Jakub Szlechter, worked as a house painter. His family lived in modest conditions in the Zamarstynów district of Lwów. His brother was Emil Henryk Schlechter, a famed lawyer in Paris and expert of Assyria.

Schlechter attended the prestigious State Gymnasium named after Hetman Stanisław Żółkiewski in Lwów, graduating in 1923 with a “sufficient” result in his matura examinations. During his school years, he developed early literary and performance interests, and according to later recollections, he was already active in amateur artistic circles. As a teenager, he volunteered in the Małopolska Volunteer Army during the Polish–Bolshevik War in 1920, participating in the defense of Lwów.

In 1929, several years after graduation, he enrolled in the Faculty of Law at the Jan Kazimierz University in Lwów. University records indicate that he attended lectures by prominent Polish legal scholars such as Kamil Stefko, Leon Piniński, Oswald Balzer, Marceli Chlamtacz, and Przemysław Dąbkowski. In 1930 he requested postponement of examinations due to illness, but there is no archival evidence confirming completion of his legal studies. It is widely assumed that he did not graduate, although he may have worked intermittently in legal offices, and his younger brother Emil completed full legal training and became an attorney in Lwów. The presence of legal education in his environment contributed to his intellectual formation and later participation in elite cultural circles, including attendance at events such as the Ball of Young Lawyers in Warsaw in the early 1930s.

Later on, in Lwow, He wrote lyrics for revue performances and cabaret sketches and performed in Lwów cafés such as Roma and Muza, playing the guitar and singing, often accompanied by the pianist Juliusz Gabel. He also worked with the Lwów press and collaborated with Polish Radio Lwów after its establishment in 1930. His first major public success came in 1930 with participation in the Warsaw revue “Parada gwiazd” at the Morskie Oko theatre, led by Andrzej Wlast, where his lyrics were performed and recorded, marking his entry into national recognition.

Around 1931, he co-founded, together with Alfred Schütz, the student cabaret and theatre initiative “Złoty Pieprzyk,” which represented Jewish academic youth theatre in Lwów and staged satirical and musical performances. One of his early notable songs, “Żołnierska brać,” achieved widespread popularity and was recorded by major Polish recording companies, the Big 3 (Syrena, Odeon, Columbia).

In the early 1930s, likely around 1932–1933, Schlechter relocated to Warsaw, where his career expanded dramatically. He became one of the central lyricists of the interwar Polish entertainment industry, working simultaneously in cabaret, theatre, radio, recording studios, and cinema. He collaborated with leading composers including Henryk Wars, Jerzy Petersburski, Władysław Dan, Zygmunt Karasiński, and Szymon Kataszek, as well as prominent lyricists and writers such as Konrad Tom and Ludwik Starski. He was active in the Union of Stage Authors and Composers (ZAiKS), eventually becoming Vice President.

During this period, Schlechter also worked as a recording artist under the pseudonym Olgierd Lech, producing recordings for Odeon and Columbia, where he served as literary director. His recordings included stylized Jewish folk songs such as “Srulek,” “Żydowskie wesele,” and “Kołysanka matki,” which blended traditional motifs with modern popular music idioms. These works contributed to the popularization of Jewish-themed musical material within Polish interwar entertainment culture.

From the early 1930s onward, Schlechter became a major figure in Warsaw cabaret and theatre, working with venues such as Qui Pro Quo, Cyrulik Warszawski, Cyganeria, Stara Banda, and Małe Qui Pro Quo. He wrote sketches, monologues, dialogues, and lyrics for revues, often combining satire, urban humor, and sentimental romanticism. His writing style was characterized by rhythmic fluency, colloquial accessibility, and a strong sense of musicality, which made his texts particularly suitable for adaptation into popular song.

Schlechter’s most significant contribution to Polish culture came through film. Between 1933 and 1939, he participated in the creation of approximately thirty Polish films, writing or co-writing screenplays for at least eleven, contributing lyrics to songs in at least 26, and providing dialogue or additional material for several others. He also appeared on screen in a minor acting role in the film “Kochaj tylko mnie.” His early film success began with “Każdemu wolno kochać” (1933), for which he wrote the screenplay and title song, and continued with productions such as “Parada rezerwistów,” “Jadzia,” “Piętro wyżej,” “Włóczęgi,” and others. He frequently collaborated with directors such as Mieczysław Krawicz, Michał Waszyński, Leon Trystan, and Eugeniusz Bodo, the latter being both a major actor and cultural icon of Polish cinema.

One of the defining aspects of Szlechter’s work was his collaboration with Henryk Wars, with whom he created numerous songs that became national hits and remain part of Polish cultural memory. Among them are “Umówiłem się z nią na dziewiątą,” “Sex appeal,” “Co bez miłości wart jest świat,” “Nic o tobie nie wiem,” and “To nie ty.” His lyrics were performed by leading interwar stars such as Bodo, Hanka Ordonówna, Tola Mankiewiczówna, Adolf Dymsza, and Mieczysław Fogg. Many of these songs became so widely disseminated that their phrases entered everyday Polish language.

A particularly important thematic strand in Schlechter’s work was his connection to Lwów. Together with Henryk Wars, he created a cycle of songs associated with the city and its mythical identity, including “Tylko we Lwowie,” “My dwaj, obacwaj,” and “Dobranoc, oczka zmruż,” performed by the famous comedy duo Szczepko and Tońko (Kazimierz Wajda and Henryk Vogelfänger). These works contributed significantly to the idealized cultural image of pre-war Lwów as a humorous, musical, and socially cohesive urban space.

In 1936, Schlechter filed a civil lawsuit with an Amsterdam attorney against film producer Stefan Gulanicki after two songs he had been commissioned to write for the film Panienka z poste restante were only partially used. Although he had been paid for both compositions, only one appeared in the finished film. Schlechter demanded 1,000 złoty in damages, arguing that the omission harmed both his financial interests and his professional reputation as a songwriter. He claimed that the agreement implied the use of both songs in the production, not just payment for their creation. The same year, Schlechter was involved in a court case after a bailiff attempted to seize his typewriter as part of debt enforcement proceedings. Schlechter argued that the typewriter was his essential working tool as a professional songwriter and therefore could not be legally confiscated. He filed a motion in the Warsaw District Court requesting that the machine be exempt from seizure. During the hearing, actor and theatre figure Fryderyk Járosy testified as a witness, humorously emphasizing that Schlechter’s handwriting was so illegible that his work could not be used without a typewriter.

By the late 1930s, Schlechter had become one of the most recognizable figures in Polish popular culture. His lyrics shaped not only entertainment but also linguistic habits, with expressions from his songs becoming part of colloquial Polish speech. He was considered one of the key architects of Polish film song culture, alongside figures such as Ludwik Starski and Marian Hemar.

After the outbreak of World War II in 1939, Schlechter left Warsaw and returned to Lwów, which came under Soviet occupation following the Molotov–Ribbentrop Pact. He continued to work in local theatre, including the State Theatre of Miniatures, which operated in an old cinema house. After the German invasion of the Soviet Union in 1941, Lwów came under Nazi occupation, and Schlechter was forced into the Lwów Ghetto. He later became a prisoner of the Janowska concentration camp on Janowska Street, where conditions were characterized by extreme brutality, forced labor, and systematic executions.

Despite the conditions, Schlechter reportedly continued artistic activity within the camp, associated with Tango of Death orchestra, a forced prisoners orchestra, and other forced musical performances organized by camp authorities. According to survivor testimonies, including those of Simon Wiesenthal, camp officials exploited musicians for performances under coercion. Schlechter wrote the Tango of Death around 1942 and wrote other works in Janowska, none of which survive today. Schlechter is believed to have survived in the camp for a period due to his usefulness in such contexts, though he ultimately perished in 1943. The exact circumstances of his death remain uncertain.

His only known surviving relative, apart from his brother, to provide postwar testimony, Eugenia Brecher, indicated that he, his wife, and his son were murdered in the Holocaust, on November 11, 1943. Postwar commemorative efforts, including submissions to Yad Vashem, sought to preserve his memory as part of the cultural and human losses of Polish Jewry.

Some of his hits included:

- Umówiłem się z nią na dziewiątą (I Have a Date with Her at Nine), music by Henryk Wars
- Sex-appeal, music by Henryk Wars
- Nie ja—nie ty! (Neither me, nor you!), music by Henryk Gold, sung by Schlechter himself
- Nic o tobie nie wiem... (I Know Nothing About You), music by Henryk Gold, sung by Mieczysław Fogg
- Co bez miłości wart jest świat with Konrad Tom, music by Henryk Wars
- Ty i ja (You And I) with Fred Scher
- Ja mam czas, ja poczekam (I have time, I can wait) music by Mieczysław Mierzejewski
- Odrobinę szczęścia w miłości (A bit of luck with love), music by Jerzy Petersburski and sung by Stefan Witas
- Młodym być i więcej nic (To be young and nothing more), music by Jerzy Petersburski, Ivo Wesby orchestra

== Filmography ==
=== Screenplays ===
- Parada rezerwistów (1934)
- Co mój mąż robi w nocy? (1934)
- Antek policmajster (1935)
- American Adventure (1936)
- Bedzie lepiej (1936)
- Jadzia (1936)
- Królowa przedmieścia (1937)
- Kochaj tylko mnie (1937)
- Strachy (1938)
- Szczesliwa 13-ka (1938)
- Robert and Bertram (1938)
- Piętro wyżej (1938)
- Serce matki (1938)
- Ja tu rządzę (1939)
- Wlóczegi (1939)

=== Dialogues ===
- Wyrok życia (1933)
- Każdemu wolno kochać (1933)
- Czy Lucyna to dziewczyna (1934)
- Jaśnie pan szofer (1935)
- Jego wielka miłość (1935)
- Dodek na froncie (1936)
- Będzie lepiej (1936)
- Królowa przedmieścia (1937)
- Robert i Bertrand (1938)

=== Films with his song lyrics ===
- Czarna perła (1934)
- Kochaj tylko mnie (1937)
- Piętro wyżej (1938)

== Bibliography ==
- A. Redzik, Jak twórca szlagierów wszech czasów nie został adwokatem – rzecz o Emanuelu Schlechterze (1904–1943). W 110. rocznicę urodzin i 70. rocznicę śmierci, „Palestra” 2014, nr 1–2, s. 245–255.
- A. Redzik, Emil Henryk Szlechter (1906–1995) – w dwudziestą rocznicę śmierci, "Palestra" 2015, nr 1–2, s. 216.
- Lerski, Tomasz M. (2012). "Emanuel Szlechter". Polski Słownik Biograficzny. Vol. 48. Polska Akademia Nauk & Polska Akademia Umiejętności. pp. 351–353.
