= Będzie lepiej =

1936 Polish film

- Directed by: Michał Waszyński
- Written by: Jan Fethke, Napoleon Sądek
- Music by: Henryk Wars
- Release date: 1936
- Country: Poland
- Language: Polish

Będzie lepiej (English: It will get better) is a 1936 Polish musical comedy directed by Michał Waszyński. It features characters Szczepko and Tońko (played by Kazimierz Wajda and Henryk Vogelfänger, respectively), who were known for their work together as radio personalities and as members of the vaudeville circuit in the city of Lwów. They also appeared in Waszyński's film The Vagabonds (1939).

== Plot ==
Szczepko and Tońko work in a Lwów doll factory until they are fired for violating the factory's rule against singing. The two then wander around a nearby park, where they find an abandoned infant and decide to take care of it. The niece of the factory owner, Wanda Ruczyńska, then appears and asks the two men for assistance with her car. In a mix-up, Wanda ends up leaving with the baby and Szczepko and Tońko are empty-handed. Wanda and her uncle take the baby with them to Warsaw, so Szczepko and Tońko hide inside a toy crate and ship themselves to the city to find the baby. Upon their arrival, they argue with Wanda over ownership of the baby, but are induced to work at the family's toy shop in exchange for seeing the baby. Under the direction of Szczepko and Tońko's goofiness, the toy shop becomes incredibly successful. It is eventually decided that the baby will stay with Wanda and her newfound love, while Szczepko and Tońko are cast out of the family and wander off to find new adventure.

== Cast ==
- Kazimierz Wajda ... Szczepko
- Henryk Vogelfänger ... Tońko
- Loda Niemirzanka ... Wanda Ruczyńska
- Aleksander Żabczyński ... Julian Dalewicz
- Antoni Fertner ... Ruczyński
- Wanda Jarszewska ... Ruczyńska
- Stanisław Sielański ... Hipek
- Wilhelm Korabiowski ... Franciszek, secretary of Dalewicz
- Wanda Zawiszanka ... Basia, the Ruczyński maid
- Irena Skwierczyńska ... Blond Mother in Park
