= Tango of Death =

Forced Jewish orchestra at the Janowska concentration camp

Tango of death
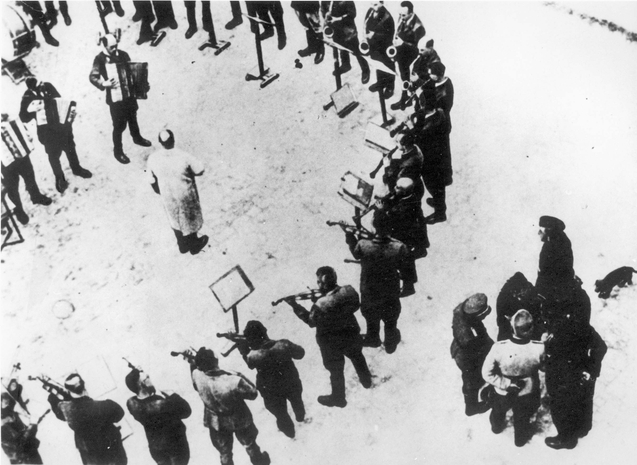
- A photo of the orchestra, which was used to illustrate Nazi crimes at the Nuremberg trials

Background information
- Years active: 1941 — 1944
- Past members: Jacob Mund, Leon Strix, Jozef German, Emanuel Schlechter, and others

Tango of Death was a Jewish orchestra in the Janowska concentration camp, located on what is now the outskirts of Lviv, Ukraine.

== History ==
In Lviv, which was seized at the end of June 1941, shortly after the Lviv pogrom carried out at the beginning of July, the "Jewish Worker Camp", later known as the Janowska concentration camp, began to form under the leadership of the German administration by the Ukrainian auxiliary police, formed from the "marching groups" of the OUN (Organization of Ukrainian Nationalists).

The initiator of the compulsory organization of musician-prisoners in the orchestra was the deputy commandant of the Janowska camp, SS-Untersturmführer Richard Rokita who before the war had "played the violin in a jazz band in Katowice." Rokita was one of many sadistic villains at the camp; "Choice sadists and various scum of the Nazi death machine were in the Janowska concentration camp. Many of these people suffered from pathological perversions...The most diverse ways of killing people were used in this camp. Each Nazi tried to outdo his colleagues by discovering his own special killing method."

The 40-person orchestra consisted of the best Lviv musicians, Jewish prisoners of the camp, some of whom were famous within Europe or even world-famous. The violinist, composer, conductor Jacob Mund, who before the war held the position of musical director of local city theaters, was appointed the head of the orchestra. Among the orchestra musicians Josef German, violinist Leonid Stricks, and cellist Leon Eber. During "selections and actions," the orchestra performed a tango "Todestango" [Tango of Death]...composed by Yakub Munt (sp?), former director of the Lviv opera. The literary director of Janowska and a member of the orchestra as an creative director was Emanuel Schlechter. The music was not based on an Argentinian tango composed by [Eduardo Bianco] but on the Polish tango To ostatnia niedziela (The Last Sunday) one of the long-time hits composed in 1935 by the Jewish pianist and band leader Jerzy Petersburski (1895-1979)]."

Shortly before the liberation of Lviv, all orchestra musicians were shot. According to Ukrainian survivor Bohdan Kokh: "The most terrible day was the last one, when 25,000 Jews were shot...This operation ended with the last orchestra coming to the pit; they were undressed, they laid down their instruments; they went into the pit, but before that they played the 'Tango of Death' for themselves."

Subsequently, a sonderkommando was formed, which was engaged in concealing the crimes of the Nazis.
