= 2022–23 in Polish football =

Football in Poland
- Season: 2022–23

Men's football
- Ekstraklasa: Raków Częstochowa
- I liga: ŁKS Łódź
- II liga: Polonia Warsaw
- Polish Cup: Legia Warsaw
- Polish Super Cup: Raków Częstochowa

2022–23 in Polish football
- Teams in Europe
- Lech Poznań; Raków Częstochowa; Pogoń Szczecin; Lechia Gdańsk
- Poland national team
- 2022 FIFA World Cup; UEFA Euro 2024 qualifying

The 2022–23 season is the 98th season of competitive football in Poland.

== Men's football ==
=== League competitions ===
==== Ekstraklasa ====
Pos	Team	Pld	W	D	L	GF	GA	GD	Pts	Qualification or relegation
1	Raków Częstochowa (C)	34	23	6	5	63	24	+39	75	Qualification for the Champions League first qualifying round
2	Legia Warsaw	34	19	9	6	57	37	+20	66	Qualification for the Europa Conference League second qualifying round (Note: Since the winner of the 2022–23 Polish Cup qualified for the Europa Conference League based on league position, the third Europa Conference League second qualifying round berth was transferred to the 4th-placed team.)
3	Lech Poznań	34	17	10	7	51	29	+22	61	Qualification for the Europa Conference League second qualifying round
4	Pogoń Szczecin	34	17	9	8	57	46	+11	60	Qualification for the Europa Conference League second qualifying round
5	Piast Gliwice	34	15	8	11	40	31	+9	53	
6	Górnik Zabrze	34	13	9	12	45	43	+2	48	
7	Cracovia	34	12	10	12	41	35	+6	46	
8	Warta Poznań	34	12	9	13	37	35	+2	45	
9	Zagłębie Lubin	34	12	9	13	35	44	−9	45	
10	Radomiak Radom	34	12	8	14	34	41	−7	44	
11	Stal Mielec	34	11	10	13	36	40	−4	43	
12	Widzew Łódź	34	11	8	15	38	47	−9	41	
13	Korona Kielce	34	11	8	15	39	48	−9	41	
14	Jagiellonia Białystok	34	9	14	11	48	49	−1	41	
15	Śląsk Wrocław	34	9	11	14	35	48	−13	38	
16	Wisła Płock (R)	34	10	7	17	41	50	−9	37	Relegation to I liga
17	Lechia Gdańsk (R)	34	8	6	20	28	56	−28	30	Relegation to I liga
18	Miedź Legnica (R)	34	4	11	19	33	55	−22	23	Relegation to I liga

Source: ekstraklasa.org
Rules for classification: 1) Points; 2) Head-to-head points; 3) Head-to-head goal difference; 4) Goal difference; 5) Goals scored; 6) Number of wins; 7) Number of away wins; 8) Lower number of points based on yellow and red cards (red card = 3 points, yellow card = 1 point, sending-off = 3 points - including 1 point for first yellow card); 9) Fairplay ranking; 10) Draw. (Note: Head-to-head record is used only after all the matches between the teams in question have been played)
(C) Champions; (R) Relegated

==== I liga ====
Pos	Team	Pld	W	D	L	GF	GA	GD	Pts	Promotion or Relegation
1	ŁKS Łódź (C, P)	34	19	9	6	58	36	+22	66	Promotion to Ekstraklasa
2	Ruch Chorzów (P)	34	17	11	6	48	33	+15	62	Promotion to Ekstraklasa
3	Bruk-Bet Termalica Nieciecza	34	16	13	5	55	37	+18	61	Qualification for Promotion play-offs
4	Wisła Kraków	34	18	6	10	61	38	+23	60	Qualification for Promotion play-offs
5	Puszcza Niepołomice (O, P)	34	16	10	8	49	36	+13	58	Qualification for Promotion play-offs
6	Stal Rzeszów	34	14	9	11	56	43	+13	51	Qualification for Promotion play-offs
7	Podbeskidzie Bielsko-Biała	34	12	13	9	56	47	+9	49	
8	Arka Gdynia	34	13	9	12	56	45	+11	48	
9	Chrobry Głogów	34	12	10	12	44	53	−9	46	
10	GKS Katowice	34	10	14	10	41	39	+2	44	
11	Zagłębie Sosnowiec	34	10	12	12	33	43	−10	42	
12	Górnik Łęczna	34	9	13	12	40	45	−5	40	
13	GKS Tychy	34	10	9	15	46	52	−6	39	
14	Resovia Rzeszów	34	9	11	14	43	51	−8	38	
15	Odra Opole	34	10	7	17	39	48	−9	37	
16	Skra Częstochowa (R)	34	9	4	21	18	49	−31	31	Relegation to II liga
17	Chojniczanka Chojnice (R)	34	5	12	17	35	57	−22	27	Relegation to II liga
18	Sandecja Nowy Sącz (R)	34	5	12	17	28	54	−26	27	Relegation to II liga

Source: 1liga.org, 90minut.pl
Rules for classification: 1) Points; 2) Head-to-head points; 3) Head-to-head goal difference; 4) Goal difference; 6) Goals scored; 7) Number of wins; 8) Number of away wins. (Note: Head-to-head record is used only after all the matches between the teams in question have been played)
(C) Champions; (O) Play-off winner; (P) Promoted; (R) Relegated

==== II liga ====
Pos	Team	Pld	W	D	L	GF	GA	GD	Pts	Promotion or Relegation
1	Polonia Warsaw (C, P)	34	18	11	5	57	36	+21	65	Promotion to I liga
2	Znicz Pruszków (P)	34	18	5	11	49	37	+12	59	Promotion to I liga
3	Kotwica Kołobrzeg	34	17	8	9	45	33	+12	59	Qualification for Promotion play-offs
4	Stomil Olsztyn	34	14	15	5	51	32	+19	57	Qualification for Promotion play-offs
5	Wisła Puławy	34	16	8	10	56	38	+18	56	Qualification for Promotion play-offs
6	Motor Lublin (O, P)	34	15	10	9	52	37	+15	55	Qualification for Promotion play-offs
7	KKS 1925 Kalisz	34	15	9	10	63	45	+18	54	
8	Pogoń Siedlce	34	13	9	12	41	42	−1	48	
9	Olimpia Elbląg	34	12	11	11	40	36	+4	47	
10	GKS Jastrzębie	34	13	8	13	41	45	−4	47	
11	Lech II Poznań	34	10	12	12	45	60	−15	42	
12	Hutnik Kraków	34	10	10	14	41	48	−7	40	
13	Radunia Stężyca	34	10	9	15	47	57	−10	39	
14	Zagłębie II Lubin	34	11	5	18	44	68	−24	38	
15	Górnik Polkowice (R)	34	10	7	17	46	52	−6	37	Relegation to III liga
16	Siarka Tarnobrzeg (R)	34	8	9	17	37	57	−20	33	Relegation to III liga
17	Garbarnia Kraków (R)	34	9	5	20	52	65	−13	32	Relegation to III liga
18	Śląsk II Wrocław (R)	34	8	7	19	38	57	−19	31	Relegation to III liga

Source: 90minut.pl
Rules for classification: 1) Points; 2) Head-to-head points; 3) Head-to-head goal difference; 4) Goal difference; 6) Goals scored; 7) Number of wins; 8) Number of away wins. (Note: Head-to-head record is used only after all the matches between the teams in question have been played)
(C) Champions; (O) Play-off winner; (P) Promoted; (R) Relegated

==== III liga ====
===== Group 1 =====
Pos	Team	Pld	W	D	L	GF	GA	GD	Pts	Promotion
1	ŁKS Łódź II (C, P)	34	20	8	6	76	41	+35	68	Promotion to II liga
2	Legionovia Legionowo	34	18	10	6	71	43	+28	64	
3	Pogoń Grodzisk Mazowiecki	34	18	10	6	62	39	+23	64	
4	Świt Nowy Dwór Mazowiecki	34	18	7	9	66	45	+21	61	
5	Legia Warsaw II	34	15	10	9	66	48	+18	55	
6	Lechia Tomaszów Mazowiecki	34	15	10	9	51	43	+8	55	
7	Unia Skierniewice	34	15	8	11	41	38	+3	53	
8	Mławianka Mława	34	15	7	12	83	71	+12	52	
9	Jagiellonia Białystok II	34	13	10	11	65	54	+11	49	
10	Pilica Białobrzegi	34	12	9	13	53	55	−2	45	
11	Pelikan Łowicz	34	12	9	13	56	52	+4	45	
12	Sokół Ostróda (Note: Sokół Ostróda withdrawn the league after the season.) (W)	34	10	6	18	49	71	−22	36	Withdrawal
13	Olimpia Zambrów	34	9	9	16	40	63	−23	36	
14	Broń Radom	34	9	8	17	60	76	−16	35	
15	Wisła Sieradz	34	8	10	16	39	53	−14	34	
16	Concordia Elbląg	34	8	9	17	38	61	−23	33	
17	Błonianka Błonie (R)	34	8	6	20	35	68	−33	30	Relegation to IV liga
18	Ursus Warsaw (R)	34	5	10	19	42	72	−30	25	Relegation to IV liga

Source: 90minut.pl
Rules for classification: 1. Number of points reached in the entire series of games; 2. Number of points reached in direct matches; 3. Goal difference in direct matches; 4. Goal difference in direct matches – away goals counted twice; 5. Goal difference in the whole series of games; 6. Number of goals scored in the entire series of games.
(C) Champions; (P) Promoted; (R) Relegated; (W) ?

===== Group 2 =====
Pos	Team	Pld	W	D	L	GF	GA	GD	Pts	Promotion
1	Olimpia Grudziądz (C, P)	34	23	7	4	73	18	+55	76	Promotion to II liga
2	Pogoń Szczecin II	34	20	9	5	69	25	+44	69	
3	Polonia Środa Wielkopolska	34	20	4	10	75	54	+21	64	
4	Zawisza Bydgoszcz	34	19	5	10	69	45	+24	62	
5	Gedania Gdańsk	34	19	4	11	63	59	+4	61	
6	KP Starogard Gdański	34	17	8	9	44	35	+9	59	
7	Świt Szczecin	34	16	7	11	61	41	+20	55	
8	Pogoń Nowe Skalmierzyce	34	16	6	12	51	46	+5	54	
9	Sokół Kleczew	34	14	5	15	53	48	+5	47	
10	Unia Swąrzedz	34	11	11	12	37	42	−5	44	
11	Cartusia Kartuzy (Note: GKS Przodkowo has been rebranded as Cartusia Kartuzy.)	34	11	10	13	37	40	−3	43	
12	Błękitni Stargard	34	10	12	12	46	45	+1	42	
13	Stolem Gniewino	34	9	9	16	33	52	−19	36	
14	Unia Solec Kujawski	34	9	8	17	40	59	−19	35	
15	Vineta Wolin	34	8	11	15	47	66	−19	35	
16	Jarota Jarocin (R)	34	9	6	19	41	69	−28	33	Relegation to IV liga
17	Bałtyk Gdynia (R)	34	8	4	22	43	70	−27	28	Relegation to IV liga
18	Unia Janikowo (Note: Unia Janikowo withdrawn the league after the first half of the season.) (W)	34	2	4	28	17	85	−68	10	Withdrawal

Source: 90minut.pl
Rules for classification: 1. Number of points reached in the entire series of games; 2. Number of points reached in direct matches; 3. Goal difference in direct matches; 4. Goal difference in direct matches – away goals counted twice; 5. Goal difference in the whole series of games; 6. Number of goals scored in the entire series of games.
(C) Champions; (P) Promoted; (R) Relegated; (W) Withdrawn

===== Group 3 =====
Pos	Team	Pld	W	D	L	GF	GA	GD	Pts	Promotion
1	Polonia Bytom (C, P)	34	24	3	7	69	34	+35	75	Promotion to II liga
2	Raków II Częstochowa	34	19	8	7	64	34	+30	65	
3	Rekord Bielsko-Biała	34	19	8	7	69	42	+27	65	
4	Ślęza Wrocław	34	19	3	12	73	55	+18	60	
5	Carina Gubin	34	16	6	12	47	45	+2	54	
6	Górnik Zabrze II	34	15	6	13	68	61	+7	51	
7	Gwarek Tarnowskie Góry	34	14	9	11	60	52	+8	51	
8	MKS Kluczbork	34	14	6	14	61	55	+6	48	
9	Lechia Zielona Góra	34	12	11	11	51	51	0	47	
10	LKS Goczałkowice-Zdrój	34	12	10	12	41	43	−2	46	
11	Pniówek Pawłowice	34	12	10	12	64	60	+4	46	
12	Stilon Gorzów Wielkopolski	34	13	5	16	50	62	−12	44	
13	Warta Gorzów Wielkopolski	34	11	10	13	42	56	−14	43	
14	Stal Brzeg (R)	34	10	7	17	51	75	−24	37	Relegation to IV liga
15	Polonia Nysa (R)	34	8	12	14	42	50	−8	36	Relegation to IV liga
16	Miedź Legnica II (R)	34	7	9	18	45	63	−18	30	Relegation to IV liga
17	Odra Wodzisław Śląski (R)	34	7	7	20	57	88	−31	28	Relegation to IV liga
18	Chrobry II Głogów (R)	34	7	4	23	42	70	−28	25	Relegation to IV liga

Source: 90minut.pl
Rules for classification: 1. Number of points reached in the entire series of games; 2. Number of points reached in direct matches; 3. Goal difference in direct matches; 4. Goal difference in direct matches – away goals counted twice; 5. Goal difference in the whole series of games; 6. Number of goals scored in the entire series of games.
(C) Champions; (P) Promoted; (R) Relegated

===== Group 4 =====
Pos	Team	Pld	W	D	L	GF	GA	GD	Pts	Promotion
1	Stal Stalowa Wola	34	23	5	6	72	27	+45	74	Promotion to II liga
2	Avia Świdnik	34	19	11	4	58	26	+32	68	
3	Wieczysta Kraków	34	20	7	7	75	35	+40	67	
4	KSZO Ostrowiec Świętokrzyski	34	17	7	10	61	36	+25	58	
5	Podlasie Biała Podlaska	34	14	13	7	63	42	+21	55	
6	Cracovia II (Note: Cracovia II withdrawn the league after the season. In result the 14th place, KS Wiązownica, stays in III liga.) (W)	34	16	6	12	69	48	+21	54	Withdrawal
7	Wisłoka Dębica	34	15	7	12	54	46	+8	52	
8	Sokół Sieniawa	34	14	6	14	57	65	−8	48	
9	Czarni Połaniec	34	15	2	17	47	58	−11	47	
10	Podhale Nowy Targ	34	13	6	15	59	47	+12	45	
11	Orlęta Radzyń Podlaski	36	13	6	17	44	63	−19	45	
12	Chełmianka Chełm	34	10	10	14	45	47	−2	40	
13	Unia Tarnów	34	10	10	14	43	66	−23	40	
14	KS Wiązownica	34	11	7	16	49	59	−10	40	
15	Korona II Kielce (R)	34	10	9	15	63	58	+5	39	Relegation to IV liga
16	Wisła Sandomierz (R)	34	7	6	21	40	91	−51	27	Relegation to IV liga
17	Lublinianka Lublin (R)	34	7	2	25	43	92	−49	23	Relegation to IV liga
18	ŁKS Łagów (Note: ŁKS Łagów withdrawn the league after the first half of the season.) (W)	34	11	4	19	27	63	−36	37	Withdrawal

Updated to match(es) played on 5 December 2020. Source: 90minut.pl
Rules for classification: 1. Number of points reached in the entire series of games; 2. Number of points reached in direct matches; 3. Goal difference in direct matches; 4. Goal difference in direct matches – away goals counted twice; 5. Goal difference in the whole series of games; 6. Number of goals scored in the entire series of games.
(R) Relegated; (W) Withdrawn

=== Cup competitions ===
==== Polish Cup ====
2 May 2023
16:00 CEST (UTC+02:00)

Legia Warsaw	0–0 (a.e.t.)	Raków Częstochowa
	Report
Penalties
Slisz (penalty scored); Rosołek (penalty scored); Augustyniak (penalty scored); Sokołowski (penalty scored); Wszołek (penalty scored); Nawrocki (penalty scored)	6–5	(penalty scored) Tudor; (penalty scored) Svarnas; (penalty scored) Piasecki; (penalty scored) Nowak; (penalty scored) Jean Carlos; (penalty missed) Wdowiak

Stadion Narodowy, Warsaw
Attendance: 44,701
Referee: Piotr Lasyk (Bytom)

==== Polish Super Cup ====
9 July 2022
20:10 CEST (UTC+02:00)

Lech Poznań	0–2	Raków Częstochowa
	Report	Racovițan 43'; Wdowiak 51'

Stadion Poznań, Poznań
Attendance: 15,898
Referee: Paweł Raczkowski (Warsaw)

== UEFA competitions ==
=== UEFA Champions League ===
==== Qualifying phase and play-off round ====
===== First qualifying round =====
Team 1	Agg.	Team 2	1st leg	2nd leg
Lech Poznań (Poland)	2–5	(Azerbaijan) Qarabağ	1–0	1–5

=== UEFA Europa Conference League ===
==== Qualifying phase and play-off round ====
===== First qualifying round =====
Team 1	Agg.	Team 2	1st leg	2nd leg
Lechia Gdańsk (Poland)	6–2	(North Macedonia) Akademija Pandev	4–1	2–1
Pogoń Szczecin (Poland)	4–2	(Iceland) KR	4–1	0–1

===== Second qualifying round =====
Team 1	Agg.	Team 2	1st leg	2nd leg
Lech Poznań (Poland)	6–1	(Georgia (country)) Dinamo Batumi	5–0	1–1
Rapid Wien (Austria)	2–1	(Poland) Lechia Gdańsk	0–0	2–1
Pogoń Szczecin (Poland)	1–5	(Denmark) Brøndby	1–1	0–4
Raków Częstochowa (Poland)	6–0	(Kazakhstan) Astana	5–0	1–0

===== Third qualifying round =====
Team 1	Agg.	Team 2	1st leg	2nd leg
Víkingur Reykjavík (Iceland)	2–4	(Poland) Lech Poznań	1–0	1–4 (a.e.t.)
Spartak Trnava (Slovakia)	0–3	(Poland) Raków Częstochowa	0–2	0–1

===== Play-off round =====
Team 1	Agg.	Team 2	1st leg	2nd leg
Lech Poznań (Poland)	3–1	(Luxembourg) F91 Dudelange	2–0	1–1
Raków Częstochowa (Poland)	2–3	(Czech Republic) Slavia Prague	2–1	0–2 (a.e.t.)

==== Group stage ====
===== Group C =====
Pos	Team	Pld	W	D	L	GF	GA	GD	Pts	Qualification	VIL	LCH	HBS	AW
1	(Spain) Villarreal	6	4	1	1	14	9	+5	13	Advance to round of 16	—	4–3	2–2	5–0
2	(Poland) Lech Poznań	6	2	3	1	12	7	+5	9	Advance to knockout round play-offs	3–0	—	0–0	4–1
3	(Israel) Hapoel Be'er Sheva	6	1	4	1	8	5	+3	7		1–2	1–1	—	4–0
4	Austria Wien	6	0	2	4	2	15	−13	2		0–1	1–1	0–0	—

Source: UEFA

==== Knockout phase ====
===== Knockout round play-offs =====
Team 1	Agg.	Team 2	1st leg	2nd leg
Bodø/Glimt (Norway)	0–1	(Poland) Lech Poznań	0–0	0–1

===== Round of 16 =====
Team 1	Agg.	Team 2	1st leg	2nd leg
Lech Poznań (Poland)	5–0	(Sweden) Djurgårdens IF	2–0	3–0

===== Quarter-finals =====
Team 1	Agg.	Team 2	1st leg	2nd leg
Lech Poznań (Poland)	4–6	(Italy) Fiorentina	1–4	3–2

=== UEFA Youth League ===
==== Domestic Champions Path ====
===== First round =====
Team 1	Agg.	Team 2	1st leg	2nd leg
Rukh Lviv (Ukraine)	1–0	(Poland) Zagłębie Lubin	1–0	0–0

=== UEFA Women's Champions League ===
==== Qualifying rounds ====
===== Round 1 =====
Hosted by UKS SMS Łódź.

Semi-finals
18 August
(Lithuania) Gintra	0
(Finland) KuPS	2
18 August
(Belgium) Anderlecht	3
(Poland) UKS SMS Łódź	2

Final
21 August
(Finland) KuPS (a.e.t.) (p)	2 (4)
(Belgium) Anderlecht	2 (3)
Third place
21 August
(Lithuania) Gintra	0
(Poland) UKS SMS Łódź	1

== National teams ==
=== Poland national football team ===
==== Results and fixtures ====
===== Friendlies =====
16 November 2022 Friendly	Poland	1–0	Chile	Warsaw, Poland
18:00 CET (UTC+1)	Piątek 85'	Report		Stadium: Stadion Wojska Polskiego; Attendance: 27,968; Referee: Harm Osmers (Germany)

16 June 2023 Friendly	Poland	1–0	Germany	Warsaw, Poland
20:45 CEST (UTC+2])	Kiwior 31'	Report		Stadium: Stadion Narodowy; Attendance: 57,098; Referee: Orel Grinfeld (Israel)

===== UEFA Nations League =====
====== Group 4 ======
Pos	Team	Pld	W	D	L	GF	GA	GD	Pts	Qualification or relegation	(Netherlands)	(Belgium)	(Poland)	(Wales)
1	Netherlands	6	5	1	0	14	6	+8	16	Qualification for Nations League Finals	—	1–0	2–2	3–2
2	Belgium	6	3	1	2	11	8	+3	10		1–4	—	6–1	2–1
3	Poland	6	2	1	3	6	12	−6	7		0–2	0–1	—	2–1
4	Wales (R)	6	0	1	5	6	11	−5	1	Relegation to League B	1–2	1–1	0–1	—

Source: UEFA
(R) Relegated

22 September 2022 2022–23 UEFA Nations League	Poland	0–2	Netherlands	Warsaw, Poland
20:45 CEST (UTC+2)		Report	Gakpo 13'; Bergwijn 60'	Stadium: Stadion Narodowy; Attendance: 56,673; Referee: Alejandro Hernández (Spain)

25 September 2022 2022–23 UEFA Nations League	Wales	0–1	Poland	Cardiff, Wales
20:45 CEST (UTC+2)		Report	Świderski 58'	Stadium: Cardiff City Stadium; Attendance: 31,520; Referee: Andris Treimanis (Latvia)

===== FIFA World Cup =====
====== Group C ======
Pos	Team	Pld	W	D	L	GF	GA	GD	Pts	Qualification
1	Argentina	3	2	0	1	5	2	+3	6	Advanced to knockout stage
2	Poland	3	1	1	1	2	2	0	4	Advanced to knockout stage
3	Mexico	3	1	1	1	2	3	−1	4	
4	Saudi Arabia	3	1	0	2	3	5	−2	3	

Source: FIFA

22 November 2022 2022 FIFA World Cup	Mexico	0–0	Poland	Doha, Qatar
18:00 AST (UTC+3)		Report		Stadium: Stadium 974; Attendance: 39,369; Referee: Chris Beath (Australia)

26 November 2022 2022 FIFA World Cup	Poland	2–0	Saudi Arabia	Al Rayyan, Qatar
15:00 AST (UTC+3)	Zieliński 39'; Lewandowski 82'	Report		Stadium: Education City Stadium; Attendance: 44,259; Referee: Wilton Sampaio (Brazil)

30 November 2022 2022 FIFA World Cup	Poland	0–2	Argentina	Doha, Qatar
21:00 AST (UTC+3)		Report	Mac Allister 46'; Álvarez 67'	Stadium: Stadium 974; Attendance: 44,089; Referee: Danny Makkelie (Netherlands)

====== Knockout stage ======
4 December 2022 2022 FIFA World Cup R16	France	3–1	Poland	Doha, Qatar
18:00 AST (UTC+3)	Giroud 44'; Mbappé 74', 90+1'	Report	Lewandowski 90+9' (pen.)	Stadium: Al Thumama Stadium; Attendance: 40,989; Referee: Jesús Valenzuela (Venezuela)

===== UEFA Euro 2024 qualifying =====
====== Group E ======
Pos	Team	Pld	W	D	L	GF	GA	GD	Pts	Qualification	(Albania)	(Czech Republic)	(Poland)	(Moldova)	(Faroe Islands)
1	Albania	8	4	3	1	12	4	+8	15 (Note: Head to head points: Albania 4, Czech Republic 1.)	Qualify for final tournament	—	3–0	2–0	2–0	0–0
2	Czech Republic	8	4	3	1	12	6	+6	15	Qualify for final tournament	1–1	—	3–1	3–0	1–0
3	Poland	8	3	2	3	10	10	0	11	Advance to play-offs via Nations League	1–0	1–1	—	1–1	2–0
4	Moldova	8	2	4	2	7	10	−3	10		1–1	0–0	3–2	—	1–1
5	Faroe Islands	8	0	2	6	2	13	−11	2		1–3	0–3	0–2	0–1	—

Source: UEFA
Rules for classification: Qualification tiebreakers
Notes:

24 March 2023 UEFA Euro 2024 qualifying	Czech Republic	3–1	Poland	Prague, Czech Republic
20:45 CET (UTC+1)	Krejčí 1'; Čvančara 3'; Kuchta 64'	Report	D. Szymański 87'	Stadium: Fortuna Arena; Attendance: 19,045; Referee: Anastasios Sidiropoulos (Greece)

27 March 2023 UEFA Euro 2024 qualifying	Poland	1–0	Albania	Warsaw, Poland
20:45 CEST (UTC+2)	Świderski 41'	Report		Stadium: Stadion Narodowy; Attendance: 56,227; Referee: Slavko Vinčić (Slovenia)

20 June 2023 UEFA Euro 2024 qualifying	Moldova	3–2	Poland	Chișinău, Moldova
20:45 CEST (UTC+2])	Nicolaescu 48', 79'; Baboglo 85'	Report	Milik 12'; Lewandowski 34'	Stadium: Zimbru Stadium; Attendance: 9,442; Referee: Filip Glova (Slovakia)
