= Polish Radio Wilno =

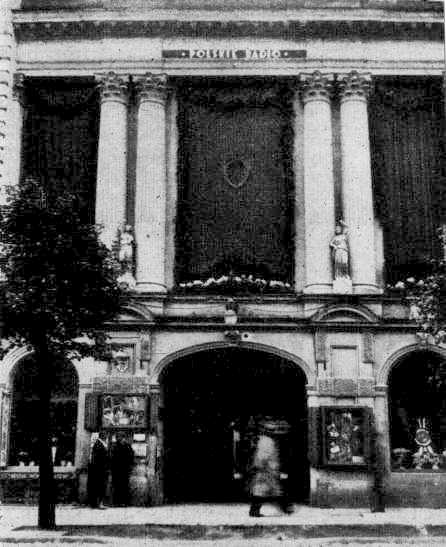
Building of Polskie Radio Wilno in 1938

Polish Radio Wilno (Polish: Polskie Radio Wilno) was a station of the Polish Radio, located in the city of Wilno (now Vilnius, Lithuania), which in the interbellum period belonged to the Second Polish Republic.

Irregular daily broadcasts began on 28 November 1927, and on 4 December 1927 the station began its normal operation. Official opening ceremony took place on 15 January 1928. Original frequency was 690 kHz, but it was changed several times, and from the mid-1930s, until the outbreak of World War II, the frequency was 536 kHz.

From 1927 to 1931, the station was located in Wilno’s district of Zwierzyniec (54°41′19″N 25°15′26″E). In 1931, a new transmitting station was opened in the district of Lipówka (54°39′13″N 25°18′07″E). It had one 16 kW transmitter (increased to 50 kW in 1936) and an antenna mounted between two 70 meter towers. Yet another station was under construction in the district of Krzyżówka (54°42′07″N 25°13′37″E), but the outbreak of World War II prevented its completion.

Among most popular broadcasts there was daily transmission of Roman Catholic mass services from the famous chapel of Ostra Brama.

The Lipówka station was bombed by German Luftwaffe on 16 September 1939, during Germany's Polish September Campaign.

== See also ==
- Radio stations in interwar Poland
- 1927 in radio
- Elektrit
