= Radio stations in interwar Poland =

Polish radio from 1918 to 1939

The pioneers of radio in Poland were army officers. These were Poles who served in the German, Austrian and Russian armies in the World War I. In autumn 1918, shortly after the war, these experts started organizing Polish radio. On 3 November 1918, in Kraków, a field station, previously used by the Austrian army, sent the first Polish radio signals. Soon, more field stations – this time German — were captured by the Poles in Warsaw and Poznań. Obviously, at first radio was used for military purposes only. Knowledge of Polish experts in this field was used to a great effect during the 1920 Polish-Soviet War.

In 1924 radio in Poland was no longer in the domain of the army. In April an Act of Parliament was passed that, among other things, legalized buying, selling, and operating radio equipment by private citizens and businesses; on 10 October the Minister of Industry and Trade issued regulations that set out conditions of obtaining broadcasting licenses and running radio stations. Soon after, an experimental station was opened by Polskie Towarzystwo Radiotechniczne.

== Polish radio and its expansion ==
In August 1925, bids were invited for the organization of a nationwide radio network. The winner was Polskie Radio S.A., managed by Zygmunt Chamiec. On 18 April 1926 they started to broadcast regular programs. The first station was located in Warsaw and the equipment was an English Marconi Wireless. It was soon replaced by a more powerful unit, with 10 kilowatts output. The old equipment was moved to Kraków. Later on, Warsaw's station was expanded and five new studios, located at Zielna Street, were commissioned.

During the following years, Polish Radio S.A. opened new stations in other main cities across the nation. These included:

1927 - Kraków and Katowice

1928 - Wilno (see: Polish Radio Wilno) (This was established at the beginning of 1928)

1928 - Poznań (This was established in mid-1928)

1930 - Two additional stations in Lwów (see: Polish Radio Lwów) and Łódź were added. Also, during the same year, a temporary station called Warsaw II was established.

On 24 May 1931 a new transmitter, located at Raszyn near Warsaw, was commissioned. Having the power of 120 kilowatts, it was the strongest transmitter in Europe. At the same time, Polskie Radio increased power of stations in Wilno and Lwów to 16 kilowatts.

Further stations were opened in Toruń (1935), a permanent station Warsaw II (1937) and in Baranowicze (1938, see Polish Radio Baranowicze). A station at Łuck, Volhynia (see Polish Radio Łuck), was almost completed by 1 September 1939, and the transmitter was to be brought from Warsaw by October. Due to the outbreak of the Second World War, the station never went on air.

== List of Polish radio stations, summer 1939 ==
Location	Opened	Frequency	Range
Warsaw I	18 Apr 1926	224 kHz	300 km
Kraków	15 Feb 1927	1022 kHz	45 km.
Poznań	24 Apr 1927	868 kHz	100 km
Katowice	4 Dec 1927	758 kHz	160 km
Wilno	15 Jan 1928	536 kHz	140 km
Lwów (Lviv)	15 Jan 1930	795 kHz	100 km
Łódź	2 Feb 1930	1339 kHz	45 km
Toruń	15 Jan 1935	968 kHz	60 km
Warszawa II	3 Mar 1937	1384 kHz	45 km
Baranowicze	1 Jul 1938	520 kHz	120 km
Łuck, Volhynia	Was to be opened in the autumn of 1939	424 kHz	most probably 120 km
