= Bałak jargon =

Variety of Polish spoken in Lwów

Bałak
- Region: Kresy
- Language family: Indo-European: Balto-Slavic; Slavic; West Slavic; Lechitic; Polish; Lesser Polish; Lwów dialect; Bałak
- Dialects: Bałak

Language codes
- ISO 639-3: –

Bałak (Polish pronunciation: [ˈbawak]; often mistakenly called bałach) is a jargon or a sociolect spoken by the commoners of the city of Lwów (modern Lviv, Ukraine). A distinct part of the Lwów dialect of the Polish language, it consists of a Lesser Poland Polish language substratum with a variety of borrowings from German, Yiddish, Ukrainian and other languages. Following the post–World War II expulsion of Poles from Lwów, bałak was gradually replaced with standard Polish among both the Polish minority still living in Lwów and the descendants of the expelees.

The name for the sociolect was coined after the verb bałakać (to speak) or balakaty (to speak in Ukrainian), a local counterpart of the standard Polish verb mówić.

== See also ==
- Balachka
