= Jan Lam =

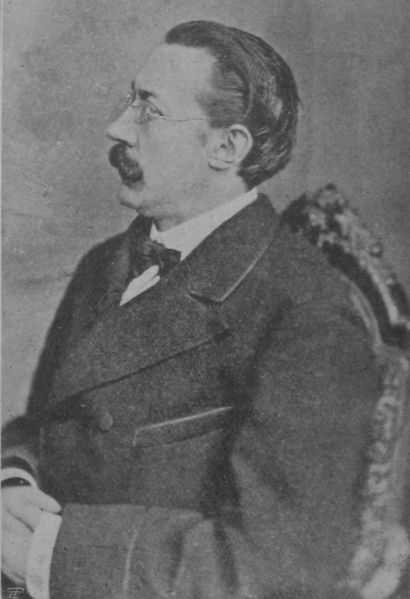
Photograph of Jan Lam

Jan Lam (16 January 1838 in Stanyslaviv – 3 August 1886 in Lviv) was a Polish journalist, writer and comic, as well as a teacher in numerous schools of Galicia. He is probably best remembered as the author of a poem Marsz Sokołów, the anthem of the Sokół, as well as a long-time journalist of the Dziennik Polski daily.

Jan Lam was born Johann Lam on January 16, 1838, in the town of Stanisławów, Austria-Hungary (in partitioned Poland under Austrian occupation) (now Ivano-Frankivsk, Ukraine). Born to a German family, he chose to be a Pole much like most of his colleagues and took part in the January Uprising against Imperial Russia. Upon his return to Austria in 1864 he was arrested and sentenced to one year in prison for his part in the struggle against Russia.

In 1866 he moved to Lwów, where he briefly appeared as a journalist of the Gazeta Narodowa daily. In 1868 he started publishing a weekly Lwów chronicles column, a largely popular satirical rubric. Its popularity made him change the newspaper and the following year he was hired by the Dziennik Polski, the most popular Polish language newspaper of Galicia. He also published a number of novels, most of which were also satirical to some extent. In his works he mocked the short-mindedness of some nobles and the clergy, as well as the absurdities of Austro-Hungarian rule and red-tape in Galicia. Such topics made Lam one of the most popular journalist of Lwów, a town primarily inhabited by burghers rather than gentry. He died August 3, 1886, in Lwów (then Austro-Hungarian Galicia, modern Lviv in Ukraine).

== Works ==
- Wielki świat Capowic (Fashionables of Buckville; 1869)
- Koroniarz w Galicji (A Crown-man in Galicia; 1870)
- Głowy do pozłoty (Heads to be Gilt; 1873)
- Idealiści (Idealists; 1876)
- Dziwne kariery (Strange Careers; 1881)
- Dzieła (Selected works in 4 volumes; 1956–1957)
