= Radio Gdańsk =

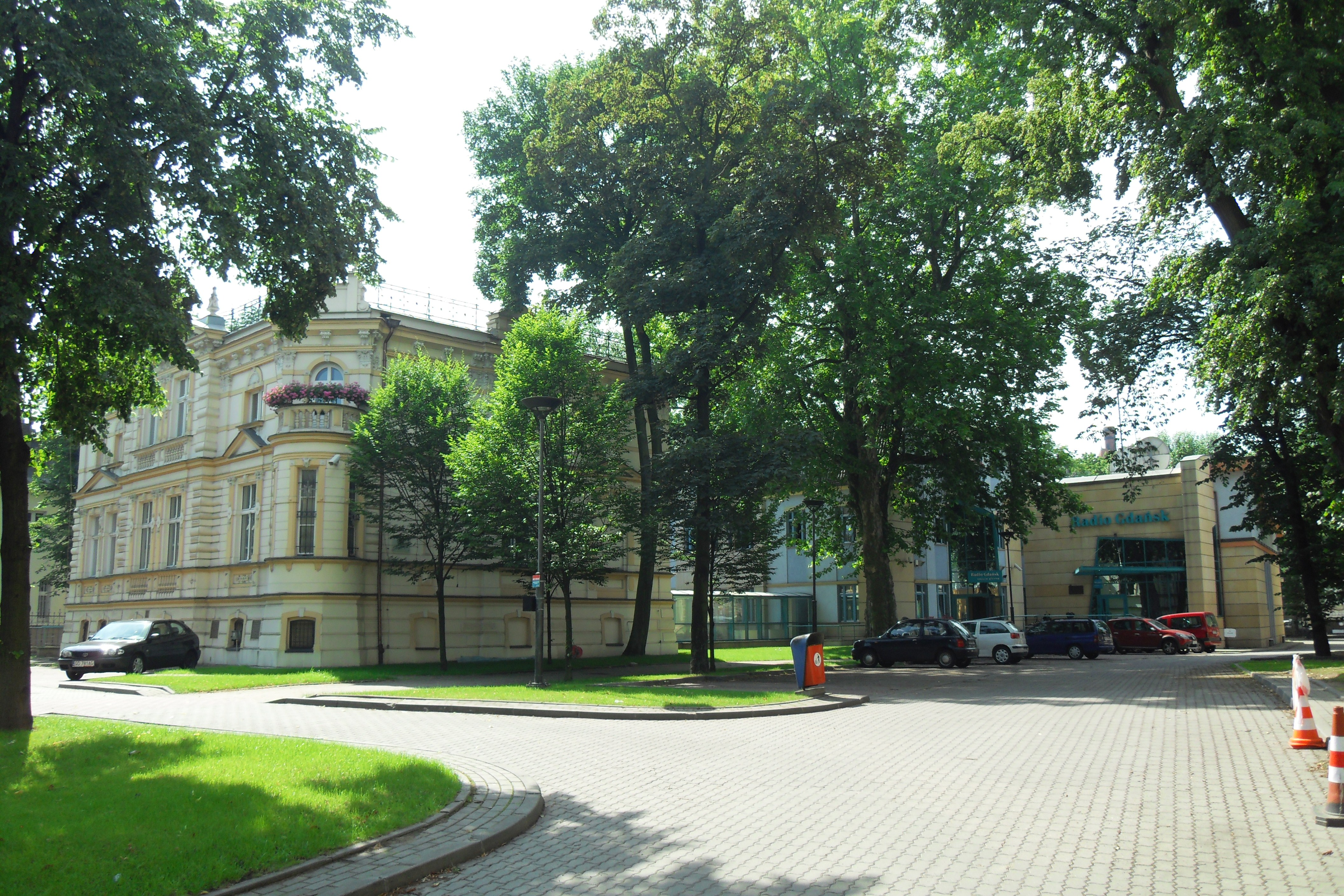
- Radio Gdańsk headquarters in Wrzeszcz Dolny in 2011

Poland
- Broadcast area: Gdańsk and surroundings
- Frequency: See list (§ Broadcasting frequencies)

Programming
- Languages: Polish, Kashubian, English, German
- Network: Polskie Radio

Ownership
- Owner: Polskie Radio – Regionalna Rozgłośna w Gdańsku „Radio Gdańsk” SA w likwidacji

History
- Founded: 15 June 1945
- First air date: 29 June 1945

Links
- Website: radiogdansk.pl

Polskie Radio Gdańsk, commonly known as Radio Gdańsk, is a radio station and affiliate of Polskie Radio based in Gdańsk and broadcasting in the surrounding areas.

== Characteristics ==
Radio Gdańsk is officially incorporated as Polskie Radio – Regionalna Rozgłośna w Gdańsku „Radio Gdańsk” SA w likwidacji (Polskie Radio – Regional Broadcast Station in Gdańsk "Radio Gdańsk" in liquidation). The company was placed in liquidation on 11 January 2024 by the Ministry of Culture and National Heritage, along with several other stations owned by Polskie Radio. Its liquidator is Krzysztof Lodziński, a lawyer closely affiliated with the Civic Platform. Although it broadcasts primarily in Polish, it also occasionally transmits programmes in Kashubian, English, and German.

=== Broadcasting frequencies ===
Radio Gdańsk broadcasts from the following cities and towns at the following frequencies:

Location	Frequency
Człuchów; Bytów; Chojnice	106 MHz
Kwidzyn	106 MHz
Tricity; Kościerzyna; Hel; Kartuzy; Elbląg; Malbork	103.7 MHz
Słupsk	102 MHz
Lębork	91.1 MHz

== History ==
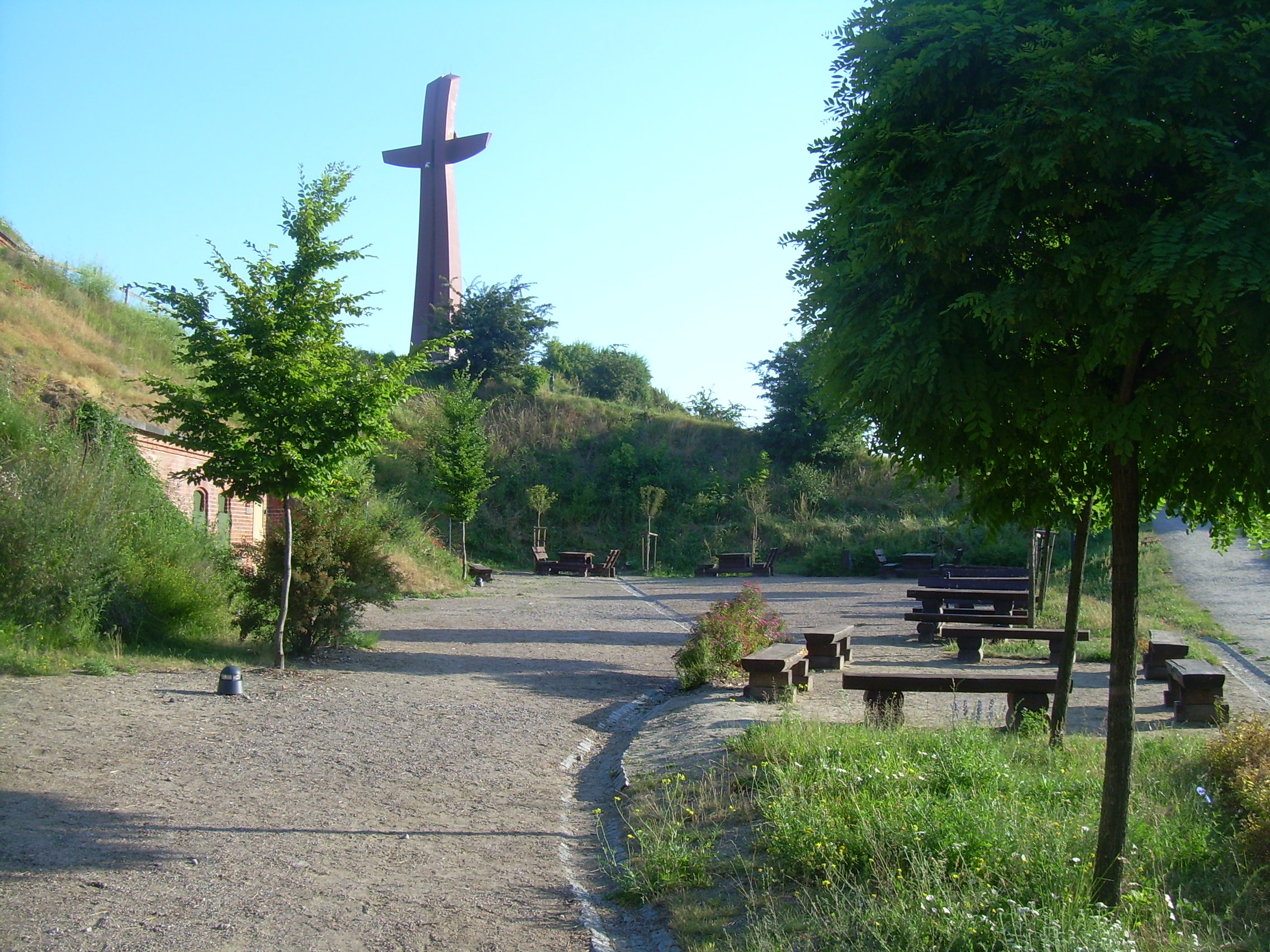
Góra Gradowa, the location of Radio Gdańsk's original broadcast studio

The first radio station in Gdańsk began operating in 1926, and, during the period of the Free City of Danzig, the city was home to numerous German-language stations, as well as a singular Polish-language station. All were entities completely separate from Radio Gdańsk itself. Radio Gdańsk, as an affiliate of Polskie Radio, was officially incorporated on 13 June 1945, with the opening of a studio on Góra Gradowa, within German barracks that had been left unused following World War II. An initial test broadcast had been transmitted on 13 June, although the formal inaugural broadcast occurred on 29 June 1945. The radio's founder was Jerzy Stańczak.

Radio Gdańsk ceased broadcasting from the barracks on Góra Gradowa in 1947, and fully concluded operations there in 1951. For much of its earlier history, the radio often struggled with censorship by governing authorities, and also limited broadcast times; it began broadcasting 24 hours per day in December 1991. A recording studio owned by Radio Gdańsk has also hosted numerous artists, including Jean-Michel Jarre, Ray Wilson, Myslovitz, Anita Lipnicka, Leszek Możdżer, Hanna Banaszak, Kombi, Rafał Blechacz, and Stefania Toczyska.
