= VovaZiLʹvova =

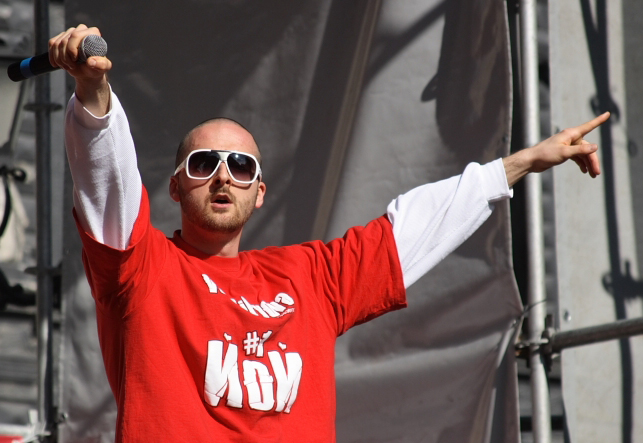

Background information
- Born: 30 December 1983 (age 42); Lviv, Ukraine
- Origin: Ukraine
- Genres: Hip-hop
- Occupation: Rapper
- Years active: 2005–2014, 2019–
- Website: http://www.youtube.com/VovaZiLvovaTV/

Volodymyr Parfeniuk (Note: Ukrainian: Володимир Парфенюк) (born 30 December 1983), known professionally as VovaZiLʹvova (Note: Ukrainian: Вова зі Львова), is a Ukrainian rapper based in Los Angeles, California.

== Biography ==
Volodymyr Parfeniuk was born in Lviv on 30 December 1983 to a family of a dental technician and a dancer. He graduated from the Kyiv National University of Culture and Arts and began working as a TV host on the M1 Ukrainian music channel. There, he met Roman Verkulich, with whom he recorded his first tracks. Parfeniuk started writing his own lyrics in 2002 and began performing in 2005. In the next year, Parfeniuk became the anchorman of the hip hop show VovaZiL’vova on the channel and released his first album. He emigrated to the United States in 2014 and stopped producing music until 2019. He writes his music together with his wife, performs for the Ukrainian diaspora in the United States, and donates some of his revenue to the Ukrainian military that is repelling the Russian invasion of Ukraine.

Parfeniuk is described as the face of Ukrainian-language hip hop music in the 2000s. He performed in the Ukrainian language, some of his music was also released in Russian and Polish.

== Discography ==
=== Albums ===
- Wine, Ladies, Gramophone (2006)
- Yoy #1 (2007)
- Yoy #2 (2012)
- Beautiful other (2013)
- Music of joy in troubled times (2020)
- Little Ukrainian Rap Almanac (2023)

=== Singles ===
- What is in the heart (2021)
- I was looking for you. I found you (2021)
- Sun (2021)
- Voice (2023)
- I am not at war. But war is in me (2024)
