= Henryk Vogelfänger =

Polish actor

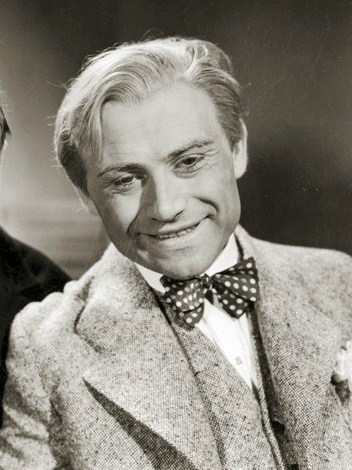
- Vogelfänger in 1936
- Born: Henryk Vogelfänger; 4 October 1904; Lemberg, Galicia, Austria-Hungary
- Died: 6 October 1990 (aged 86); Warsaw, Poland
- Other name: Henry Barker
- Occupations: Lawyer, Actor, Comedian

Henryk Vogelfänger (4 October 1904 – 6 October 1990), stage name Tońko, was a Polish actor. He lived in prewar Lwów (now Lviv, Ukraine) where he worked as a lawyer. Together with Kazimierz Wajda he was the star of the Polish Radio comedy duo Szczepko and Tońko of Wesoła Lwowska Fala, which was popular in Poland.

== Biography ==
He was a graduate of the Stanisław Staszic's 6th Junion High School in Lwów. After graduating from the university, in 1935 he opened his own law office. In 1933, together with Kazimierz Wajda ("Szczepko"), he began his comedy career in Wesoła Lwowska Fala.

During World War II he was a part of French actors troupe, performing in England and on the Western front. He was a soldier in General Maczek's First Division. After the war, he went into exile in Great Britain, where he adopted the name "Henry Barker" and practiced law. He returned to Poland in 1988.

He died on October 6, 1990, and was buried in London.

== Filmography ==
Year	Film	Role	Notes
1936	Będzie lepiej	Tońko	
1939	The Vagabonds	Antoni Tytylyta (Tońko)	
1939	Serce batiara	Tońko	unfinished due to World War II

== See also ==
- Batiar
