= The Vagabonds (1939 film) =

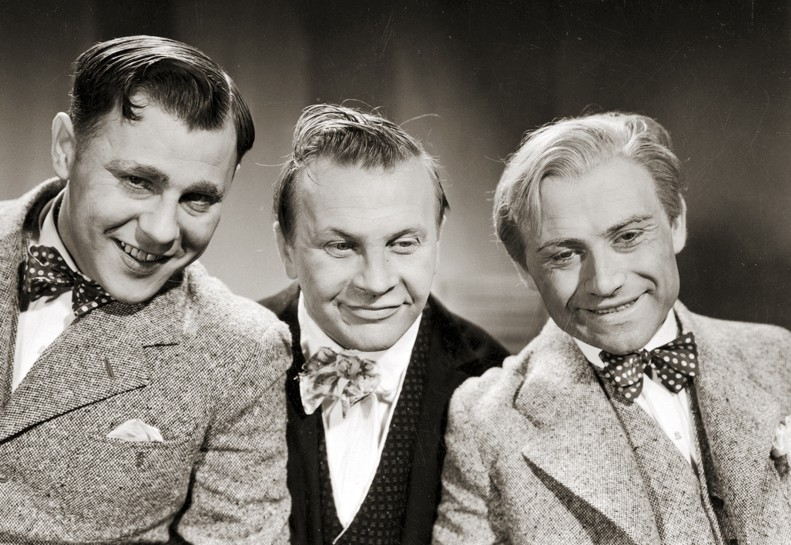
- Left to Right, Wajda, Sielanski, and Vogelfanger
- Directed by: Michał Waszyński
- Written by: Emanuel Schlechter; Konrad Tom
- Starring: Kazimierz Wajda; Henryk Vogelfänger; Stanisława Wysocka; Stanislawa Stepniowna
- Cinematography: Albert Wywerka
- Edited by: Czeslaw Raniszewski
- Music by: Henryk Wars
- Production company: Warszawskie Biuro Kinematograficzne Feniks
- Release date: April 5, 1939
- Running time: 91 minutes
- Country: Poland
- Language: Polish

The Vagabonds (Polish: Włóczęgi) is a 1939 Polish comedy film directed by Michał Waszyński and starring Kazimierz Wajda, Henryk Vogelfänger (popular Polish Radio duet Szczepko & Tońko) and Stanisława Wysocka.

== Cast ==
- Kazimierz Wajda - Szczepan (Szczepko) Migacz
- Henryk Vogelfänger - Antoni (Tońko) Tytylyta
- Stanisława Wysocka - Baroness von Dorn
- Stanislawa Stepniowna - Krysia
- Helena Grossówna - Wandzia Karsnicka
- Antoni Fertner - Trompka, private eye
- Stanisław Sielański - Niusko
- Zbigniew Rakowiecki - Wladyslaw Barski
- Andrzej Bogucki - Roman Karsnicki
- Stanisław Grolicki - Grandfather Galecki
- Helena Sulimowa - Karolina
- Helena Buczyńska - Gospodyni

== Bibliography ==
- Skaff, Sheila. The Law of the Looking Glass: Cinema in Poland, 1896-1939. Ohio University Press, 2008.
