= Kazimierz Wajda =

Polish actor and comedian

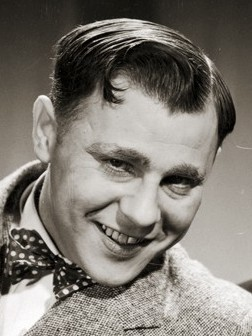
- Wajda, 1936
- Born: Kazimierz Jan Wajda; December 3, 1905; Lemberg, Kingdom of Galicia and Lodomeria, Cisleithania
- Died: May 8, 1955 (aged 49); Warsaw, Warsaw Voivodeship, Polish People's Republic
- Other name: Szczepko
- Occupations: Thespian and comic

Kazimierz Wajda (3 December 1905 in Lwów – 8 May 1955 in Warsaw), stage name Szczepko, was a Polish actor and comedian. He worked and lived in prewar Polish Lwów (now Lviv, Ukraine). Together with Henryk Vogelfänger he was a star of the radio comedy duo "Szczepko and Tońko", which was widely popular in Poland and abroad. Three movies were also made, along with comedian Stanisław Sielański.

== Selected filmography ==
- The Vagabonds (1939)
- Będzie lepiej (1936)
