= Polskie Radio =

Polish public broadcasting organization

Polish Radio
- Logo used since 2005, updated in 2017

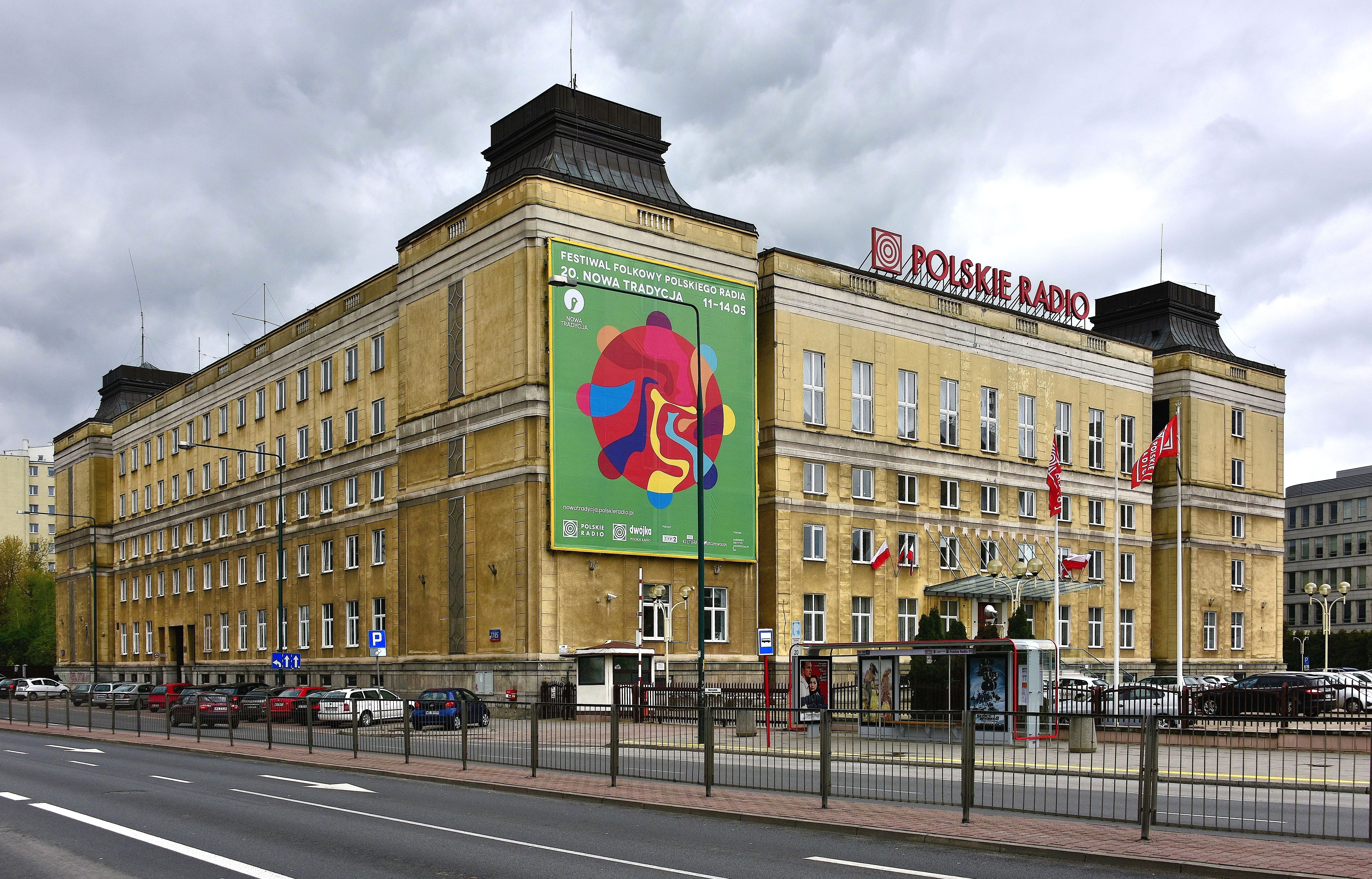
- Polish Radio's headquarters in Warsaw
- Native name: Polskie Radio S.A. w likwidacji
- Type: Sole-shareholder company of the State Treasury
- Industry: Mass media
- Founded: 18 August 1925; 101 years ago
- Founder: Zygmunt Chamiec and Tadeusz Sułowski
- Headquarters: Al. Niepodległości 77/85, 00–977 Warsaw, Poland
- Area served: Poland (Note: This website is available nationwide via phone, tablet, PC, and International PR International)
- Key people: Paweł Majcher (general director)
- Products: Broadcasting, radio, web portals
- Services: Radio broadcasting
- Website: polskieradio.pl

Interval signal/jingle used by Polskie Radio since the 1920s

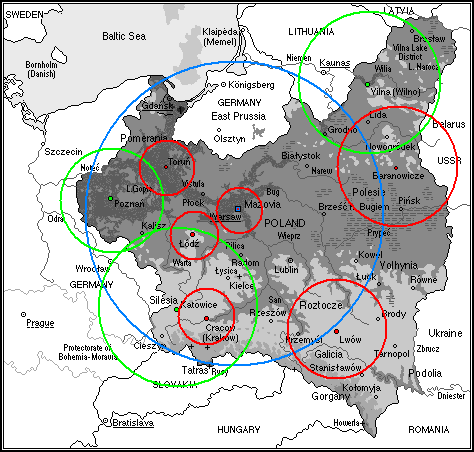
Reach of Polish Radio transmitters on 31 Aug 1939

The Polskie Radio (Polish, PR; lit. 'Polish Radio') is a national public-service radio broadcasting organization of Poland, founded in 1925. It is owned by the State Treasury of Poland. On 27 December 2023, the Minister of Culture and National Heritage, due to the President's veto on the financing of the company, placed it in liquidation.

== Chronology ==
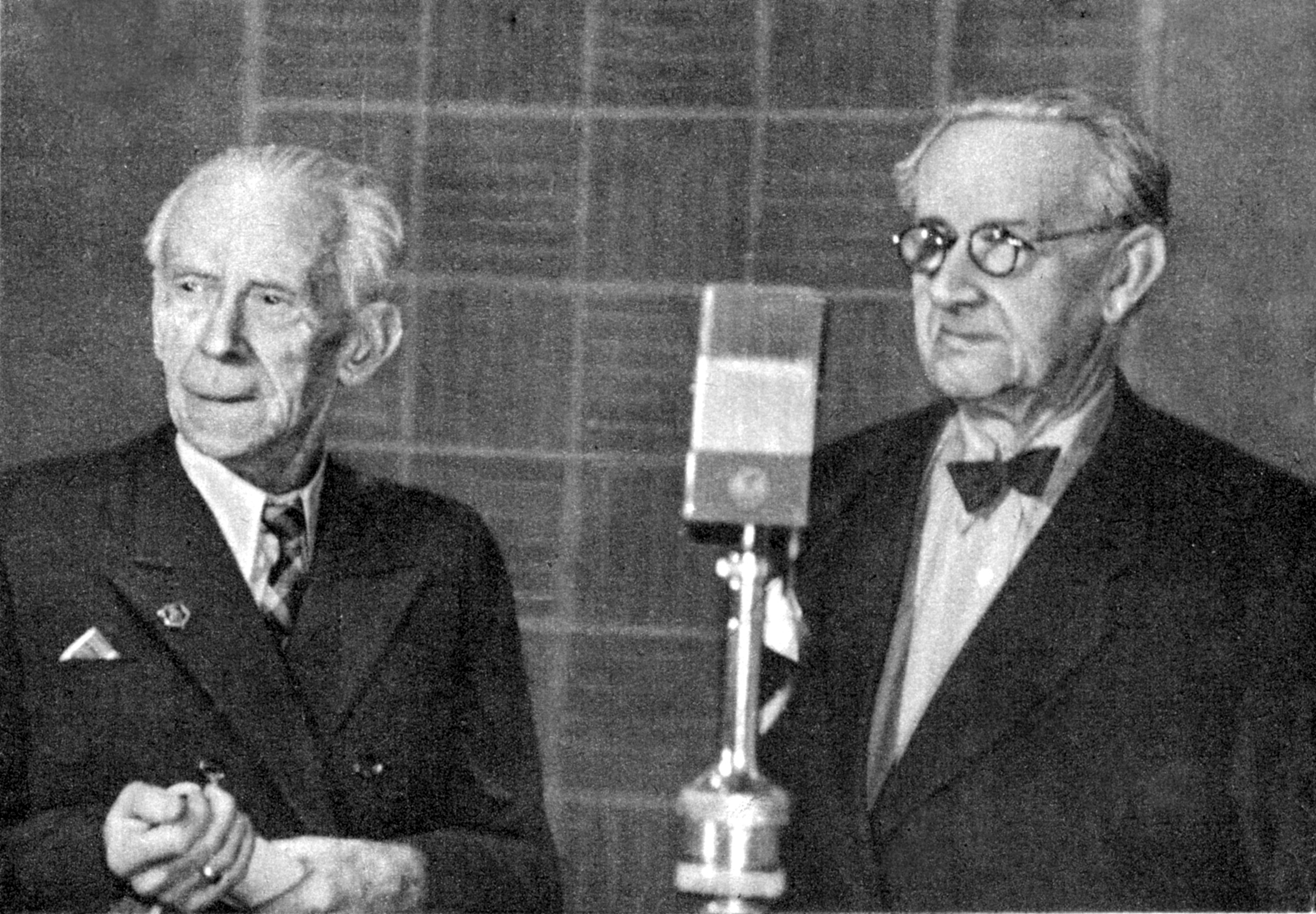
Aleksander Zelwerowicz and Ludwik Solski on Polskie Radio, 1949

Polskie Radio was founded on 18 August 1925 and began making regular broadcasts from Warsaw on 18 April 1926. Before the Second World War, Polish Radio operated one national channel – broadcast from 1931 from one of Europe's most powerful longwave transmitters situated at Raszyn (just outside Warsaw) and destroyed in 1939 due to invasion of German Army.

Polskie Radio was also broadcast on nine regional stations - Kraków from 15 February 1927, Poznań from 24 April 1927, and Katowice from 4 December 1927. Wilno joined the network from 15 January 1928. In 1930, regional stations broadcast from Lwów from 15 January 1930 and from Łódź from 2 February 1930. Toruń followed from 15 January 1935, with Warszawa broadcasting from 1 March 1937 – known as Warszawa II, the national channel becoming Warszawa I from this date. Baranowicze finally broadcast as the ninth regional station from 1 July 1938.

A tenth regional station was planned for Łuck, but the outbreak of war meant that it never opened. Out of notable people for the time, Czesław Miłosz, recipient of the 1980 Nobel Prize in Literature, worked as a literary programmer at Polish Radio Wilno in 1936.

The invasion of Poland by Nazi Germany and the Soviet Union led to the destruction of the network in September 1939, with its final broadcast being a performance of Nocturne in C-sharp minor, Op. posth. by Władysław Szpilman. Years later, Szpilman played the same piece for the reopening of the station.

Polskie Radio Trójka has been compiling Polish music charts since 1982 – in an era before there were any commercial sales or airplay rankings – making them a significant record of musical popularity in Poland. Chart archives dating from 1982 are available to the public via the station's website.

After the war, Polskie Radio was reconstructed with the assistance of the Soviet Red Army, which valued radio as a propaganda medium. It came under the tutelage of the state public broadcasting body Komitet do Spraw Radiofonii "Polskie Radio" (later "Polskie Radio i Telewizja" – PRT, Polish Radio and Television).

This body was dissolved in 1992, Polskie Radio S.A. and Telewizja Polska S.A. becoming politically dependent corporations, each of which was admitted to full active membership of the European Broadcasting Union on 1 January 1993 with the merger of EBU and OIRT.

Since 2001, Polskie Radio, jointly with Telewizja Polska, hold the "Dwa Teatry" Festival" (Polish: Two Theaters), an annual festival showcasing their television and radio plays. During the closing ceremony, awards are presented in several categories, recognizing the best productions and acting performances.

== Channels ==
=== National ===
- Program 1 (Jedynka – One) – information and popular music (pop, rock, jazz) (LW (225 kHz), FM, DAB+ and Internet radio)
- Program 2 (Dwójka – Two) – classical music and cultural (FM, DAB+ and the internet)
- Program 3 (Trójka – Three) – rock, alternative, jazz, and eclectic (FM, DAB+ and the internet)
- Polskie Radio 24 (PR24) – news and spoken-magazines (FM, DAB+ and the internet)
- Program 4 (Czwórka – Four) – youth oriented (DAB+ and the internet)
- Polskie Radio Chopin – Polish classical music (DAB+ and the internet)
- Polskie Radio Dzieciom – children programming during daytime, parents magazines in the evening and Jazz music at night (DAB+ and the internet)
- Polskie Radio Kierowców – music and information for drivers' (DAB+ and the internet)

=== Regional stations ===
Polskie Radio also operates 17 regional radio stations (operating on FM and DAB+), located in:

- Białystok (Radio Białystok)
- Bydgoszcz (Radio Pomorza i Kujaw)
- Gdańsk (Radio Gdańsk)
- Katowice (Radio Katowice)
- Kielce (Radio Kielce)
- Koszalin (Radio Koszalin)
- Kraków (Radio Kraków)
- Lublin (Radio Lublin)
- Łódź (Radio Łódź)
- Olsztyn (Radio Olsztyn)
- Opole (Radio Opole)
- Poznań (Radio Poznań)
- Rzeszów (Polskie Radio Rzeszów)
- Szczecin (Radio Szczecin)
- Warsaw (Polskie Radio RDC)
- Wrocław (Radio Wrocław)
- Zielona Góra (Radio Zachód)

=== City stations ===
Polskie Radio offers city stations in:

- Gorzów Wielkopolski – Radio Gorzów
- Lublin – Radio Freee
- Poznań – MC Radio
- Słupsk – Radio Słupsk
- Szczecin – Radio Szczecin Extra
- Wrocław – Radio RAM
- Zielona Góra – Radio Zielona Góra
- Łódź – Radio Łódź Nad Wartą

All city stations but Radio Szczecin Extra are being broadcast on FM and in Internet, while Radio Szczecin Extra is available only in Internet and via DAB+.

=== Digital-only ===
Polskie Radio also offers regional digital-only stations (all operating in Internet and DAB+ only) in:

- Kielce – Folk Radio (folk music)
- Kraków – OFF Radio Kraków (cultural)
- Wrocław – Radio Wrocław Kultura (cultural)
- Opole – Radio Opole 2
- Olsztyn – Radio Warmii i Mazur
- Łódź – Radio Łódź Extra
- Kraków – Radio Kraków Kultura

=== International ===
- Radio Poland (known until January 2007 as Radio Polonia) – external broadcasts in Belarusian, English, German, Polish, Russian, and Ukrainian – 1386 AM, HotBird 13, DAB+ (in Poland) and the internet

== Controversy ==
=== AI generated programming ===
On 29 October 2024, OFF Radio Krakow released a programme that presented itself as an interview with laureate Wisława Szymborska who had died in 2012 thus her voice being artificially generated; this was not long after its entire editorial team was dismissed. This was met with outrage with audiences voicing support for the dismissed crew as well as the signing of a petition against the move with more than 15,000 names in.

== See also ==
- Informacyjna Agencja Radiowa
- Radio stations in interwar Poland
- NOSPR

Flagship commercial radio stations in Poland

- RMF FM
- Radio Zet
- Radio Eska
