= Transport of Czech Jews to Baranavichy =

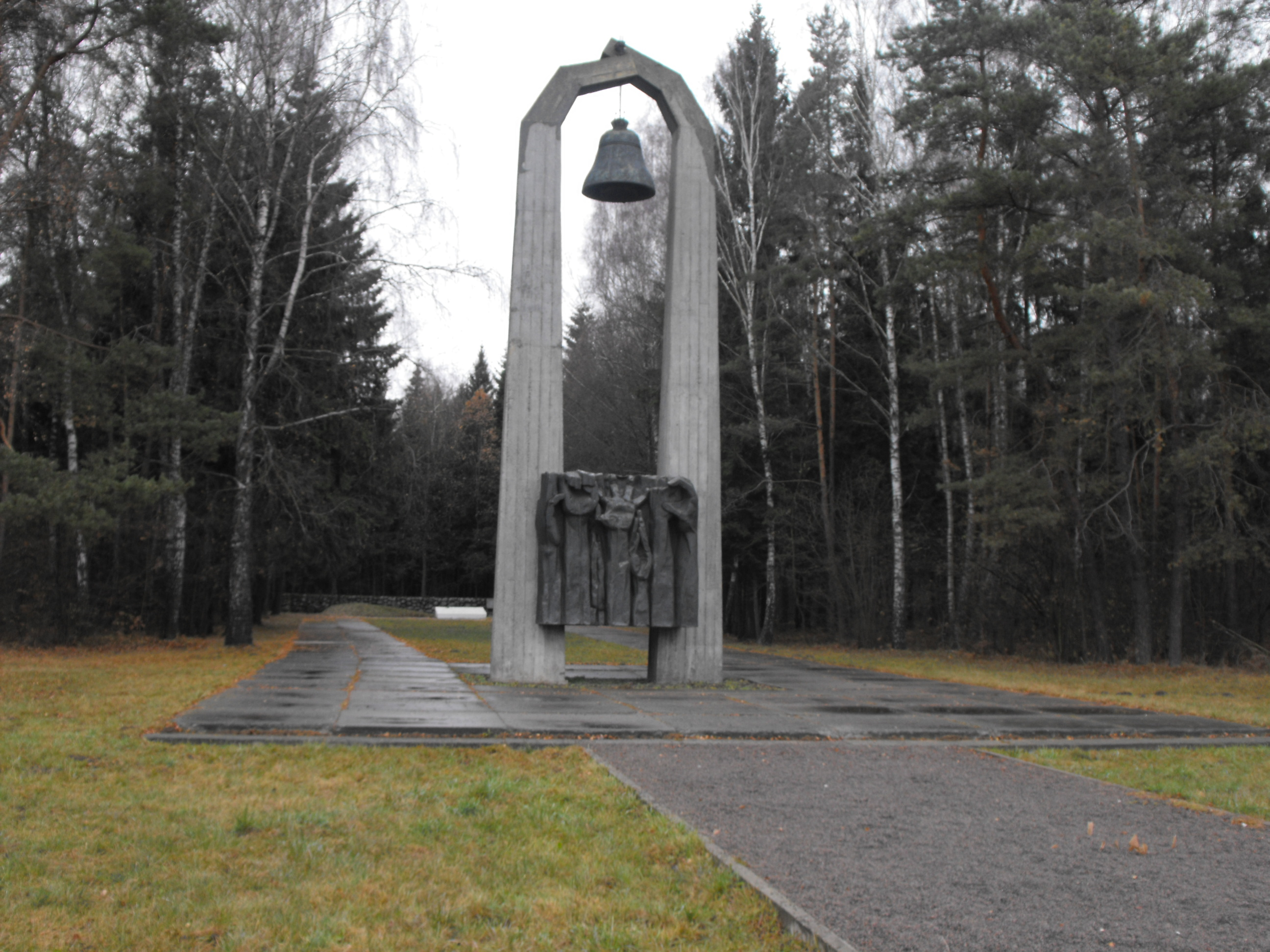
- Memorial to Czech Jews killed in Baranavichy on 31 July 1942

- Location of the memorial in Baranavichy
- Location: Near the railway at the eastern end of Kolpenitskaya Street, outside Baranavichy, Belarus; 53°9′26″N 26°3′8″E
- Date: 28 July to 31 July 1942
- Incident type: Mass murder
- Perpetrators: Nazi regime
- Victims: 999 or 1,000
- Survivors: 0
- Memorials: Forest Gai World War II Memorial

On 28 July 1942, Germans had either 999 or 1,000 Jews transported by train from the Theresienstadt Ghetto and delivered to the city of Baranavichy, Reichskommissariat Ostland (now Belarus) (Note: Dr. Zelig Levinbrok and the Memorial Museum states that there were 3,000 Jews from the Theresienstadt ghetto murdered at Baranavichy, but the list of all the deportations from Theresienstadt shows only one transport to Baranavichy for 1,000 people on 28 July 1942. It was not until after the war that the connection between transport AAy that left Theresienstadt on 28 July 1942 had arrived at Baranavichy.) on 31 July. Among the passengers were engineers, doctors, and other professionals from Czechoslovakia. Although there were Jews from Germany and Austria in Theresienstadt at the time, all of the deportees in the 28 July transport had been arrested in the Protectorate of Bohemia and Moravia; 51 percent in Prague and 48 percent in Olomouc. Most were between the age of 40 and 65.

Transporting 1,000 Jews out of Theresienstadt was part of a systematic plan to kill Jews. The Nazi regime centralized Jews in concentration camps and ghettos and then assassinated them in the ghettos or at extermination camps, like Auschwitz concentration camp. The Germans started deporting Jews from Theresienstadt to places where they would immediately be killed or sent to other killing centers in 1942. They deported almost 90,000 Jews from Theresienstadt.

The train was delayed eight hours due to an attack by Soviet partisans. The train's original destination had been Minsk, but the transport did not continue to Minsk because it would have conflicted with the mass murder of 10,000 Jews that took place there from 28 to 31 July.

The local commander of the Sicherheitspolizei in Baranavichy, SS-Untersturmführer Waldemar Amelung, had ten days to prepare the execution. Trenches were dug 3 metres (9.8 ft) deep in the preceding days by prisoners from the Koldichevo concentration camp.

Dr. Zelig Lewinbok, who provided testimony about The Holocaust, stated that the passengers were told that the train was stopping for lunch. Instead, the Schutzstaffel (SS) had the Jews murdered in the Forest Gai northeast of the city, (Note: The forest has a number of names: Gaj, Gai, Guy - and is described as a forest, tract, or wilderness. Forest Gai is used on google maps as the site of the memorial.) with no survivors. Initially, the victims were loaded into three gas vans, operated by Erich Gnewuch, Karl Gebl, and Heinz Schlechte, for execution. However, due to the delay, the executioners decided to shoot the remaining victims into trenches to finish before dark. Many victims were still alive when they fell into the trenches. After the Jews from Theresienstadt were killed, their mass grave was covered up by Jewish laborers from Koldichevo. Then, the workers were killed.

According to later testimonies, Czech railway workers or gendarmes who had accompanied the transport were also killed. The Baranovichi Gorodskaya Commission of Mass Annihilation, assigned to investigate the mass murder after the war, determined that there had been 3,000 people killed on 31 July. A memorial to the victims was established in 1972 near the burial site.
