= Waldemar Amelung =

Waldemar Amelung, a second lieutenant (Untersturmführer) of the Nazi regime, was the head of the Nazi Sicherheitsdienst (SD) office in Baranavichy, Belarus during World War II. He oversaw the mass murders of Jews. He oversaw 1,000 Czech Jews being killed at Baranavichy on 31 July 1942. Amelung coordinated the preparations over the preceding week. For instance, the effort required coordination with the Koldichevo concentration camp to attain workers to dig trenches for the mass burial. In November 1941, he planned and executed the mass murder of Jews in the forests south of Slonim in what was called a "highly coordinated, more complex, comprehensive, and organized operation in conjunction with local civilian authorities". It was a resolute plan to eliminate the Belarus Russian Jews during the second half of 1941. A militia of police, the Schutzmannschaft, and Belarus Gendarmes executed the massacres. The police were from Latvia, Lithuania, Estonia, Poland, and Belarus. In October 1941, Amelung had all the Jews at Horodyszcze brought to the town square. He identified more than 1,000 Jews who were taken by trucks to two forests near the town where German forces shot them and were buried in a mass grave. There were already 60 dead bodies of the men who dug the ditches the day before, 20 October 1941. About 70 people who had special skills, like carpenters or blacksmiths, went to a building with their families.

Amelung was born in Kopjoni, Russia on 11 November 1914. He worked as a textile technician. In 1933 and 1934, Amelunch served in the Latvian Army. A member of the Nazi Party, he was employed by the SS on 1 February 1940. He received the Infantry Assault Badge and the Eastern People's Medal. He died in 1954.

== See also ==
- List of SS personnel § Untersturmführer (second lieutenant)
- Słonim Ghetto
