= The Holocaust in Baranavichy district =

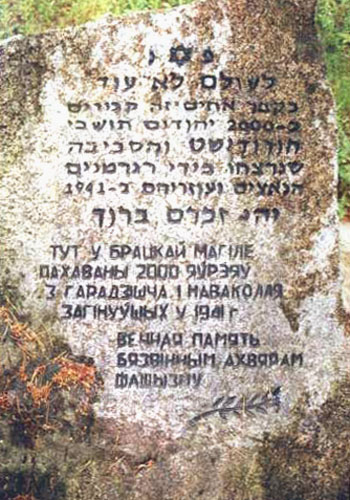
Inscription on the monument to the murdered Jews in Gorodishche, Baranavichy District

The Holocaust in Baranavichy District refers to the systematic persecution and extermination of Jews in Baranavichy District of Brest Region in Belarus by National Socialist Germany and its collaborators from 1941 to 1944 during World War II. This was part of the policy of the "Final Solution to the Jewish Question" and an integral part of the Holocaust in Belarus and the broader extermination of the European Jewry.

== Extermination of Jews in the district ==
Baranavichy District was fully occupied by German troops in June 1941, with the occupation lasting until July 1944. The Nazis divided Baranavichy District into two parts: one became part of the Reichskommissariat Ostland of the General District of Belarus, while the other was assigned to the Bialystok District of the Province of East Prussia. All power in the district was held by the Wehrmacht's occupation administration, which operated through field and local commandant's offices established by the Wehrmacht. Local administrations and police garrisons composed of Belarusian collaborators were set up in all major villages of the district.

To implement the removal of Jews from Europe and conduct punitive operations, SS punitive units, Einsatzgruppen, Sonderkommandos, the Secret Field Police (GFP), the Security Police, SD (Sicherheitsdienst), the gendarmerie, and the Gestapo arrived in the district immediately after the occupation. The National Socialists and their collaborators began the systematic extermination of Jews, with repeated organized mass killings, referred to as actions. In settlements where Jews were not killed immediately, they were confined to ghettos, forced into hard labor under dire conditions, and ultimately exterminated. The occupation authorities, under the threat of death, imposed severe restrictions on Jews, forbidding them to remove yellow patches or six-pointed stars (identification marks on outer clothing), leave the ghetto without special permission, change their place of residence within the ghetto, walk on sidewalks, use public transport, be in parks and public places, and attend schools.

Many Jews in Baranavichy District were killed during the National Socialist punitive operation "Pripyat Marshes" (Pripiatsee) conducted from July 19 to August 31, 1941. This operation, developed at the SS headquarters under Reichsführer-SS Heinrich Himmler, aimed at practicing and conducting the first mass killings of Jews by SS troops in Belarus. The direct executors of the operation were the SS Cavalry Brigade and the 162nd and 252nd Infantry Divisions, under the overall command of the Higher SS and Police Leader of the Rear of Army Group Center, SS Gruppenführer Erich von dem Bach-Zelewski. By December 1942, Jews in Baranavichy District were almost completely exterminated, with killings occurring in Baranavichy, Molchad, Gorodishche, Polonka, Mir, Novaya Mushta, Derevnaya, Serebryshche, Ishkildino, Bolshaya Rayovka, Polonechka, and Stolovichi.

== Death camp in Koldichevo ==
A few thousand Jews from the Baranavichy District were killed near the village of Koldichevo, where the Germans established a death camp in March 1942. The camp was surrounded by barbed wire, illuminated by searchlights, and guarded round the clock. Prisoners were subjected to executions, and forced labor in peat extraction. The ChGK commission discovered burial sites near the Koldychevo camp.

== Killings in the Gai Tract ==
In late June 1942, the Nazis brought 3,000 Jews from Czechoslovakia to Baranavichy, mainly representatives of the intelligentsia. Upon arrival at the railway station, they were ordered to leave their belongings and were transported by truck to the "Gai tract", two kilometers from the city, where they were shot. The belongings of the killed were transferred to the SD (Sicherheitsdienst) and subsequently sent to German families in Germany.

== Ghettos ==
The Germans, implementing the National Socialist program of killing Jews, created ghettos in Baranavichy District: In the Baranavichy Ghetto (June 28, 1941 – December 17, 1942), almost all Jews were killed. In the Gorodishche Ghetto (summer 1941 – October 21, 1941), about 2,000 Jews were killed.

In the Molchad ghetto (July 1941 – July 18, 1942), about 3,700 Jews were killed.

=== Ghetto in Novaya Mushta ===
The village of Novaya Mushta, seven kilometers from Baranavichy, was captured by German troops on June 27, 1941, this occupation lasted until July 8, 1944. In addition to local Jews, there were hundreds of refugees from Poland. The ghetto in Novaya Mysh was destroyed in August 1942, when all remaining Jews — around 500 people — were killed. The Jews were driven to the market square and marched to the place of execution. The execution was led by several Germans from the SD (Sicherheitsdienst). Local policemen were also involved with the killings. One young Jew managed to grab a hidden axe, attacked a policeman at random, and cut off his hand.

A monument to the murdered Jews of Novaya Mysh is located two kilometers northeast of the village on the roadside to the village of Kozlyakevichi of the Novomysky Village Council. The inscription on the monument in Belarusian reads: "In this place in the summer of 1942, peaceful residents of the village of Novaya Mysh and other nearby settlements were shot by fascist invaders. People, bow your heads".

=== Ghetto in Polonka ===
The village of Polonka was captured by the National Socialists in June 1941. After the occupation a ghetto was established in the village. Killings of Jews took place at the Jewish cemetery on April 18, 1942, and August 12, 1942. In total, around 350 Jews were killed in Polonka.

=== Ghetto in Stolovichi ===
In the village of Stolovichi, the ghetto existed until April 1943 (May 1942). A monument is erected at the mass grave of the prisoners near the R-5 Baranavichy-Novogrudok-Ivye road, on the Stolovichi-Arabovshchina section.

== Gallery ==
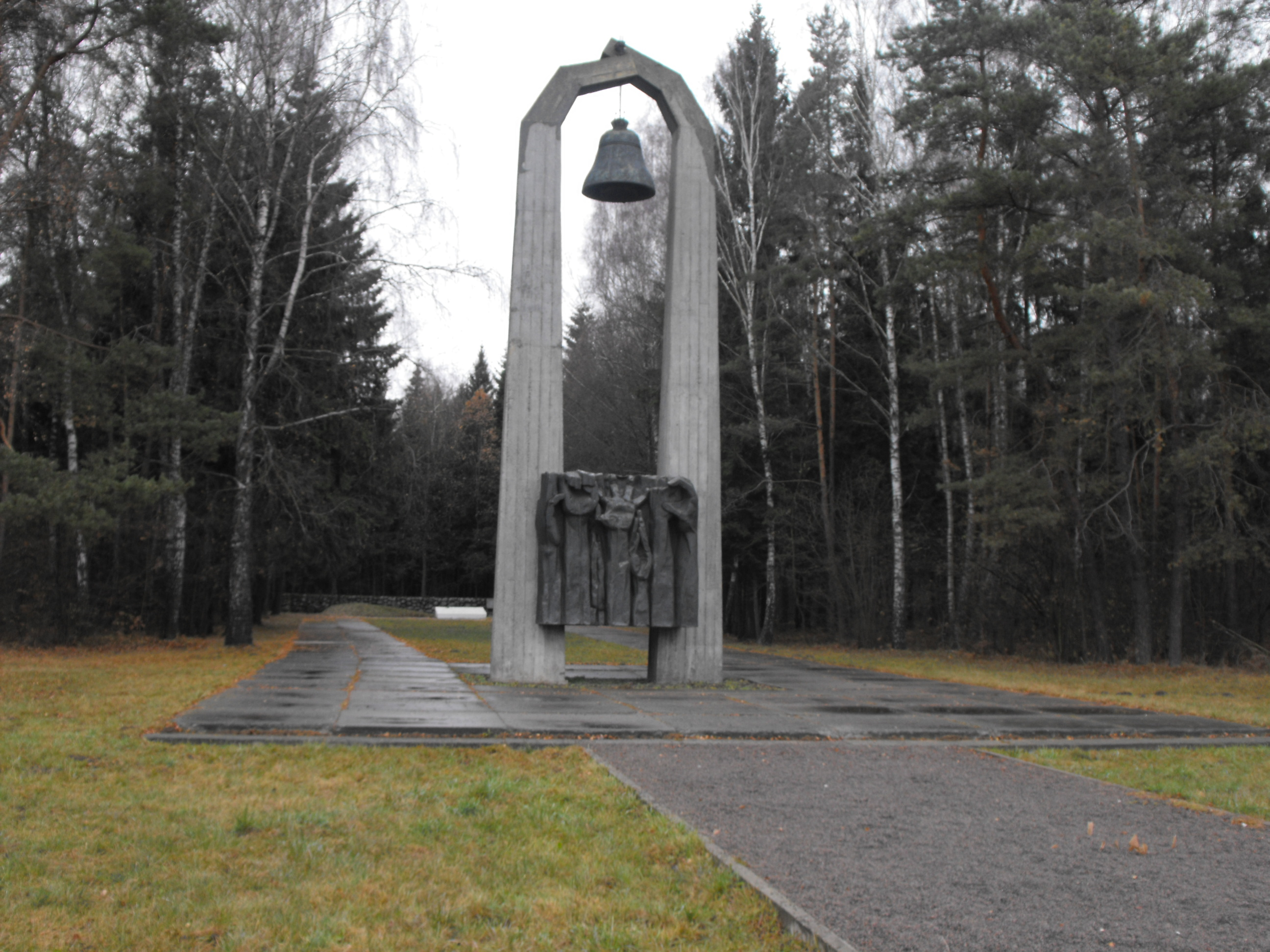
Memorial at the site of the mass murder of Jews in June 1942.

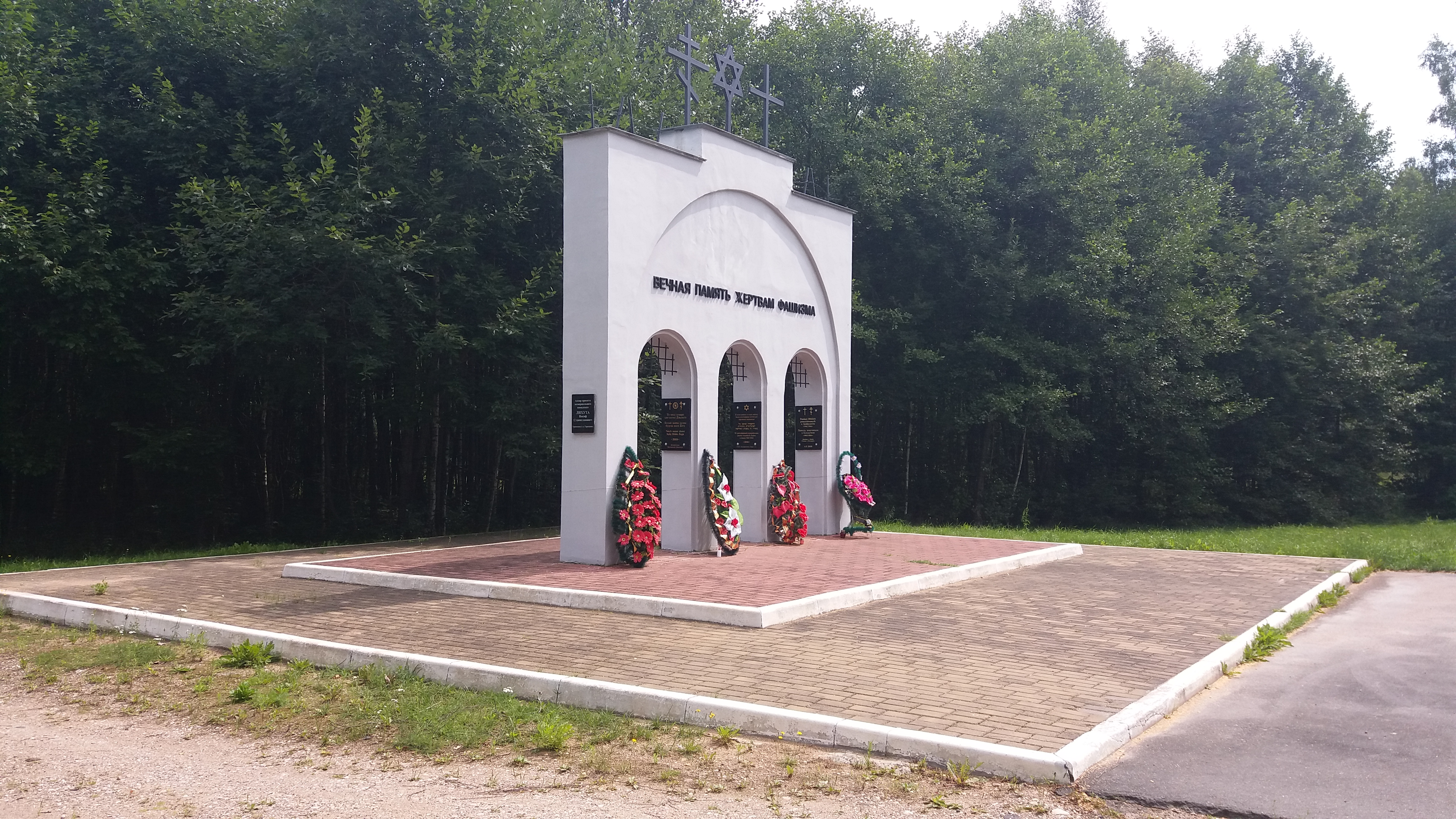
Monument to the victims of Nazism in the Koldychevo concentration camp

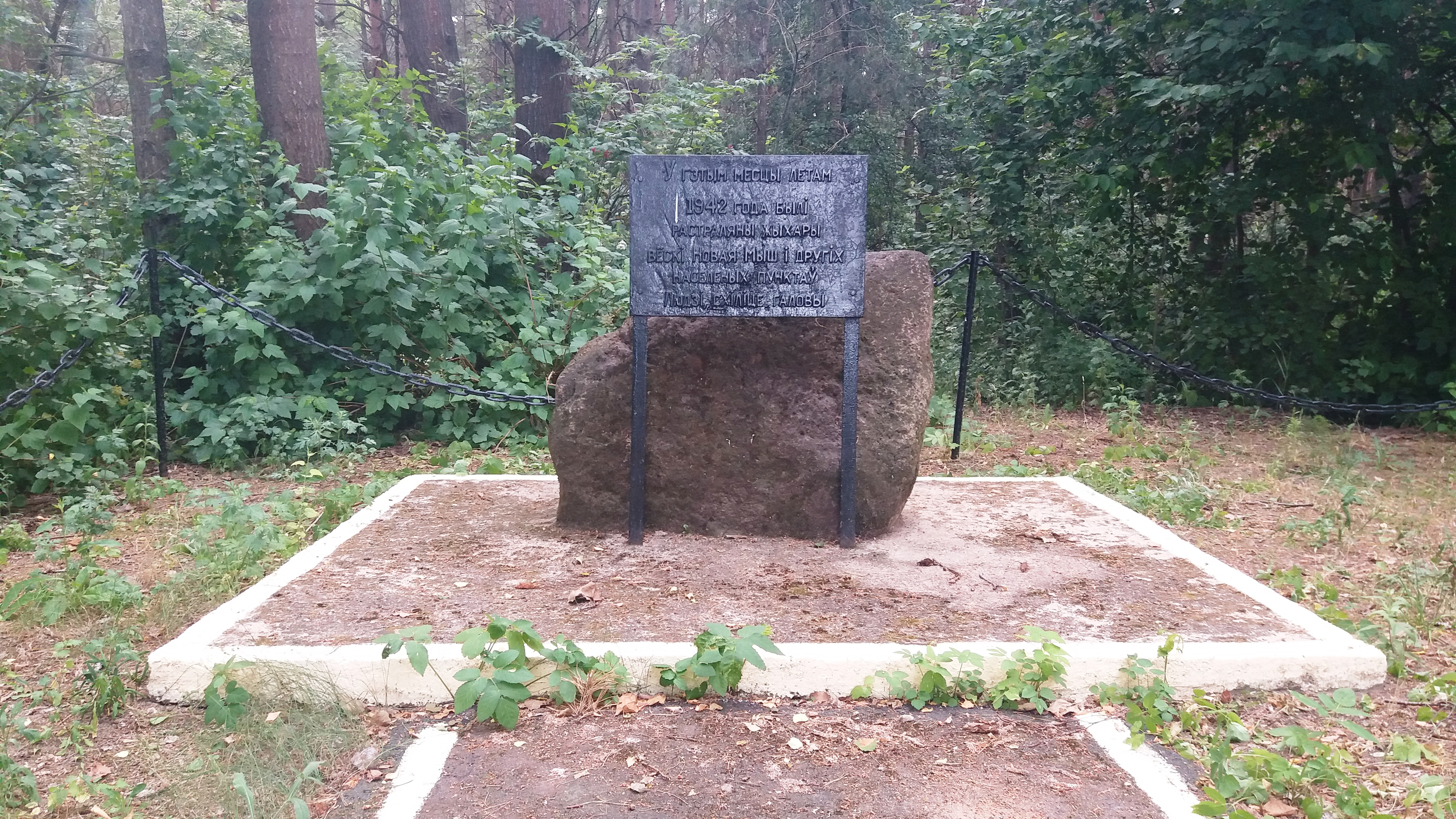
Monument to the murdered Jews of the village of Novaya Mysh

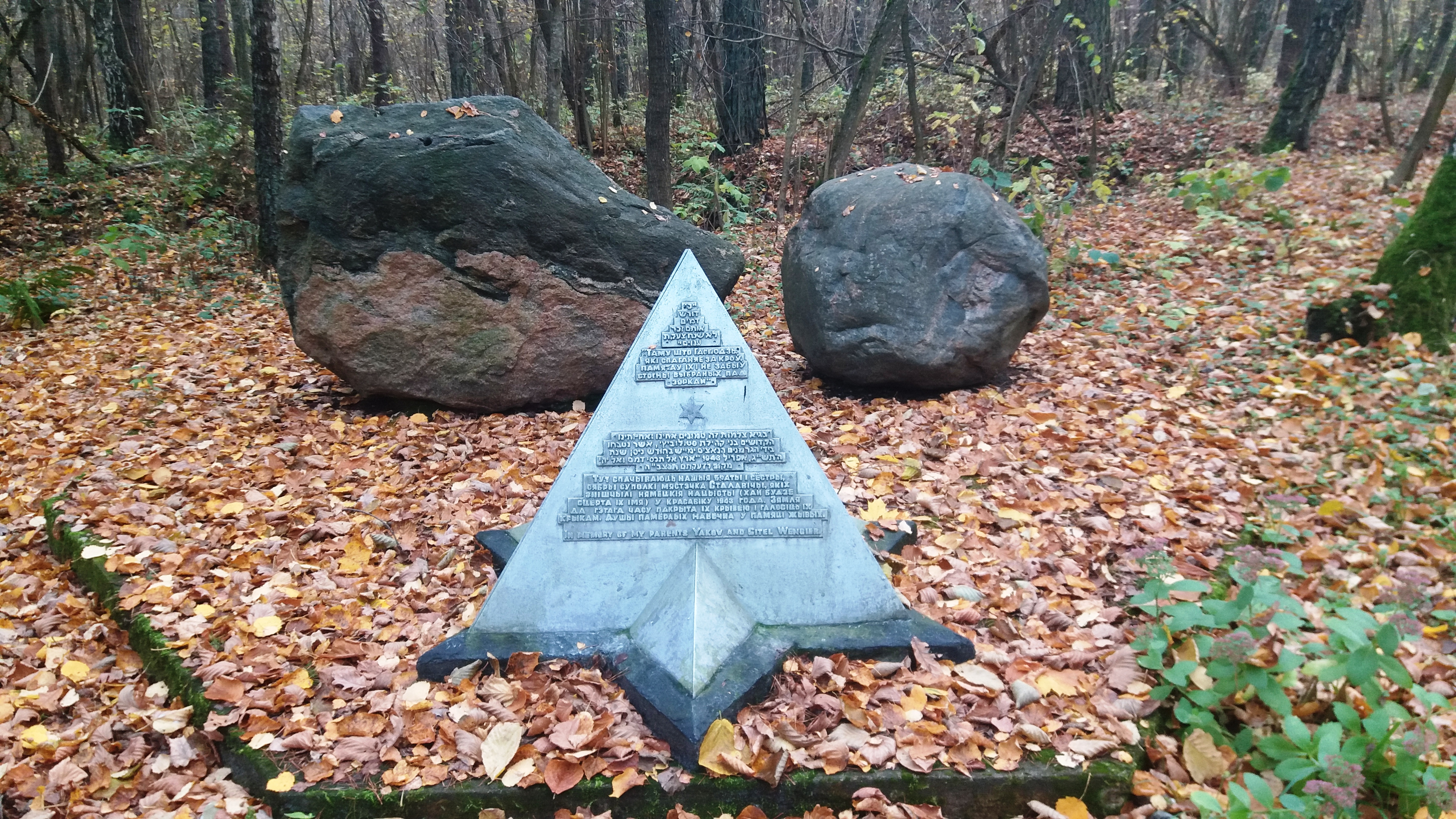
Monument at the mass grave of prisoners of the Stolovichi ghetto

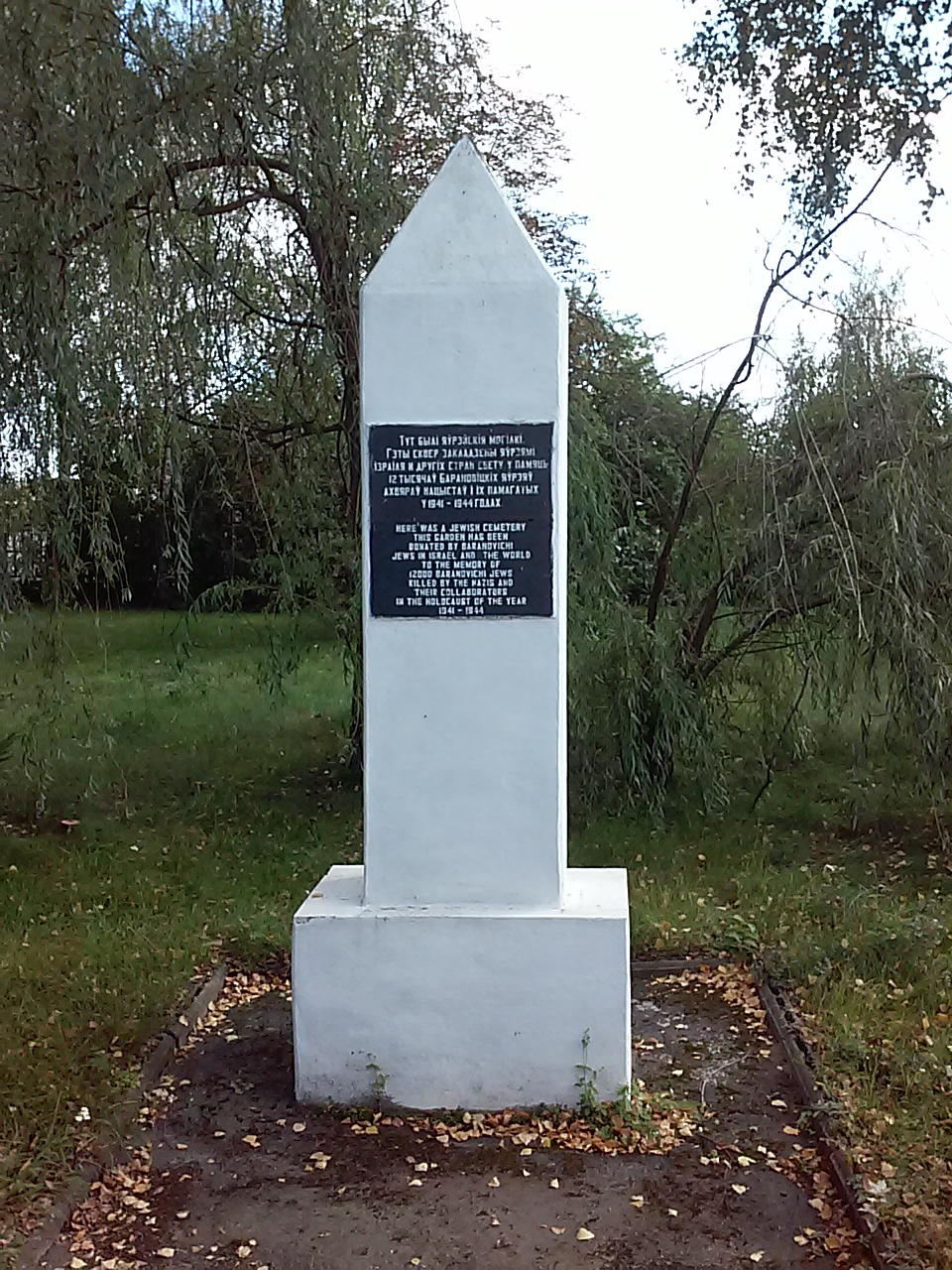
Monument at the Jewish cemetery in Baranavichy
