= Novaya Mushta =

Novaya Mushta Новая Мушта
- Village
- Location within Bashkortostan Location within Russia
- Coordinates: 55°51′N 54°23′E
- Country: Russia
- Region: Bashkortostan
- District: Krasnokamsky District
- Time zone: UTC+5:00

Novaya Mushta (Russian: Новая Мушта; Bashkir: Яңы Мошто, Yañı Moşto) is a rural locality (a village) in Shushnursky Selsoviet, Krasnokamsky District, Bashkortostan, Russia. The population was 272 as of 2010. There are 5 streets.

== Geography ==
Novaya Mushta is located 38 km south of Nikolo-Beryozovka (the district's administrative centre) by road. Shushnur is the nearest rural locality.

== See also ==
- The Holocaust in the Baranovichi District
