= Mirosław Araszewski =

Polish photographer and cinematographer (born 1941)

- Born: 24 March 1941; Baranowicze, Byelorussian SSR, Soviet Union
- Occupations: photographer, cinematographer

Mirosław Araszewski (born 24 March 1941 in Baranovichi) is a Polish photographer and cinematographer. A graduate of the National Academy of Film, Television and Theatre in Łódź he was an academic teacher from 1973 to 1985 in the Film School. He holds a PhD and is a Professor and Vice-Rector of the School of Art and Design in Łódź. He specializes in artistic photography has worked in advertising, fashion and industry. He has had several solo exhibitions and participated in numerous group exhibitions.

== Exhibitions (selected) ==
2003: 50th Anniversary Exhibition of the Lodz District of ZPAF Lodz.

2005: Exhibition "Where are we?" ZPAF Warsaw.

2006: "Places and People" exhibition, Design Gallery, Wroclaw.

2007: Exhibition ZPAF Łódź.

2008: Exhibition; ŁTF Gallery of Photography Łódź.
