= Polish Radio Baranowicze =

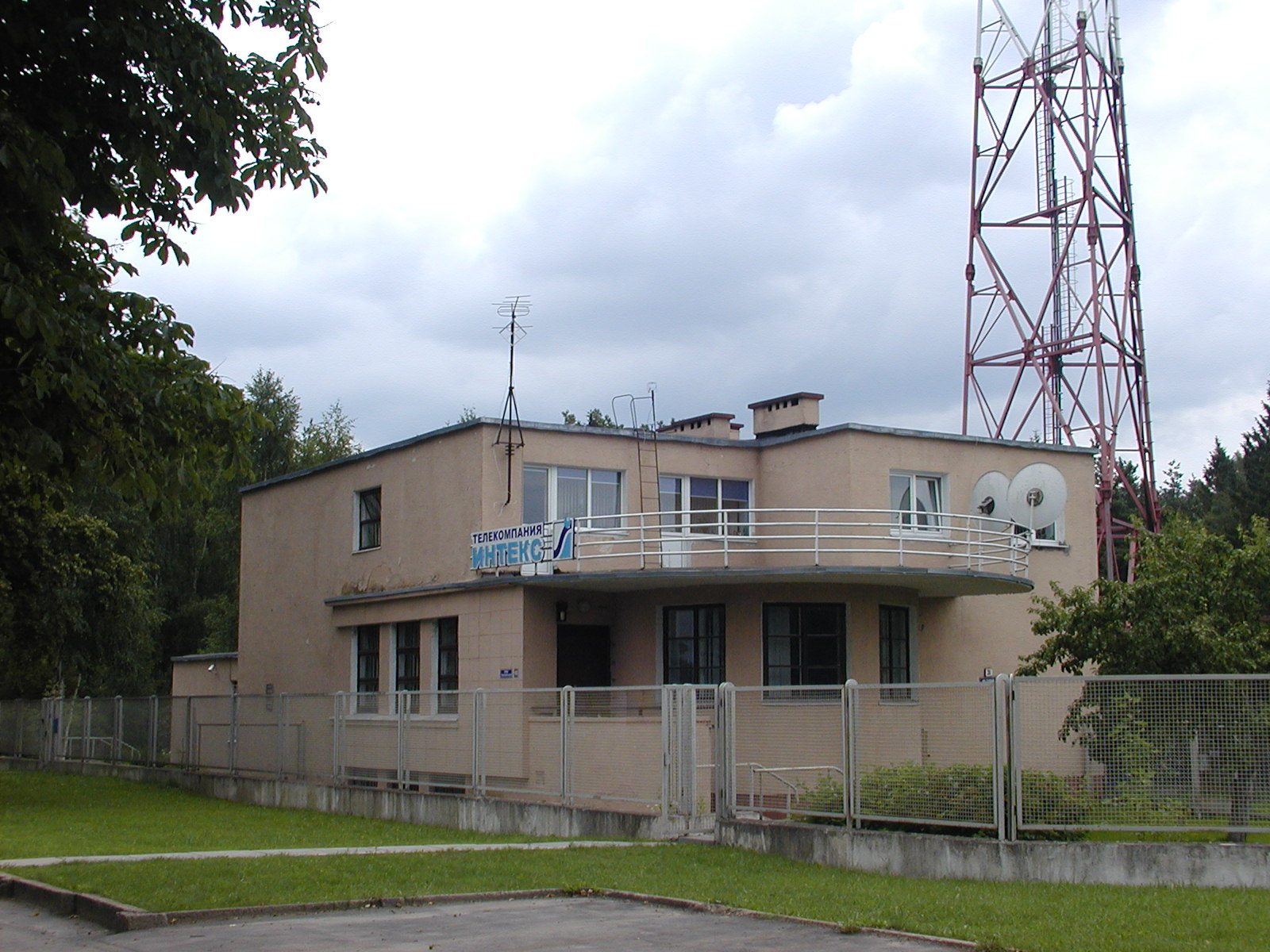
Radio Baranowicze

Polish Radio Baranowicze was a station of the Polish Radio, located in the city of Baranowicze, which in the interbellum period belonged to the Second Polish Republic. Opened in the summer of 1938, it was active only for a little more than a year (see: Invasion of Poland).

The station was opened on July 1, 1938. Its frequency was 520 kHz and range - 120 kilometers, which covered most of the Nowogródek Voivodeship and northern part of the Polesie Voivodeship. The main office was located in a building at Narutowicza Street 72, in the outskirts of the city.

Construction of the station and its office began in July 1937, and lasted until spring of 1938, on a real estate provided by the city authorities. Two isolated masts (both 141 meters high) were set, and regular broadcast was not started until October 1938. In the office, there were two recording studios and several rooms for employees. Additionally, a local power plant was modernised, as the station needed twice as much power as the whole city.

First and only director of the station was Zbigniew Cis-Bankiewicz, who also was an announcer. Additional announcers were Maryla Konzalowna, Roman Horoszkiewicz and Stefan Sojecki. Technical services were provided by a group of engineers - Jerzy Foltanski, Roman Roginski, Borys Niewiadomski, Teofil Terlecki, Adam Twarog.

Following the outbreak of the World War II, the campus of the radio was bombed by the Luftwaffe on September 16, 1939 and ceased service. Currently, the 1938 office of the radio is used by the Belarusian TV.

== See also ==
- Radio stations in interwar Poland
