= Maja Berezowska =

Polish painter

- Born: 13 April 1893; Baranowicze, Minsk Governorate, Russian Empire
- Died: 31 May 1978 (aged 85); Warsaw, Poland
- Resting place: Powązki Cemetery
- Known for: Painting

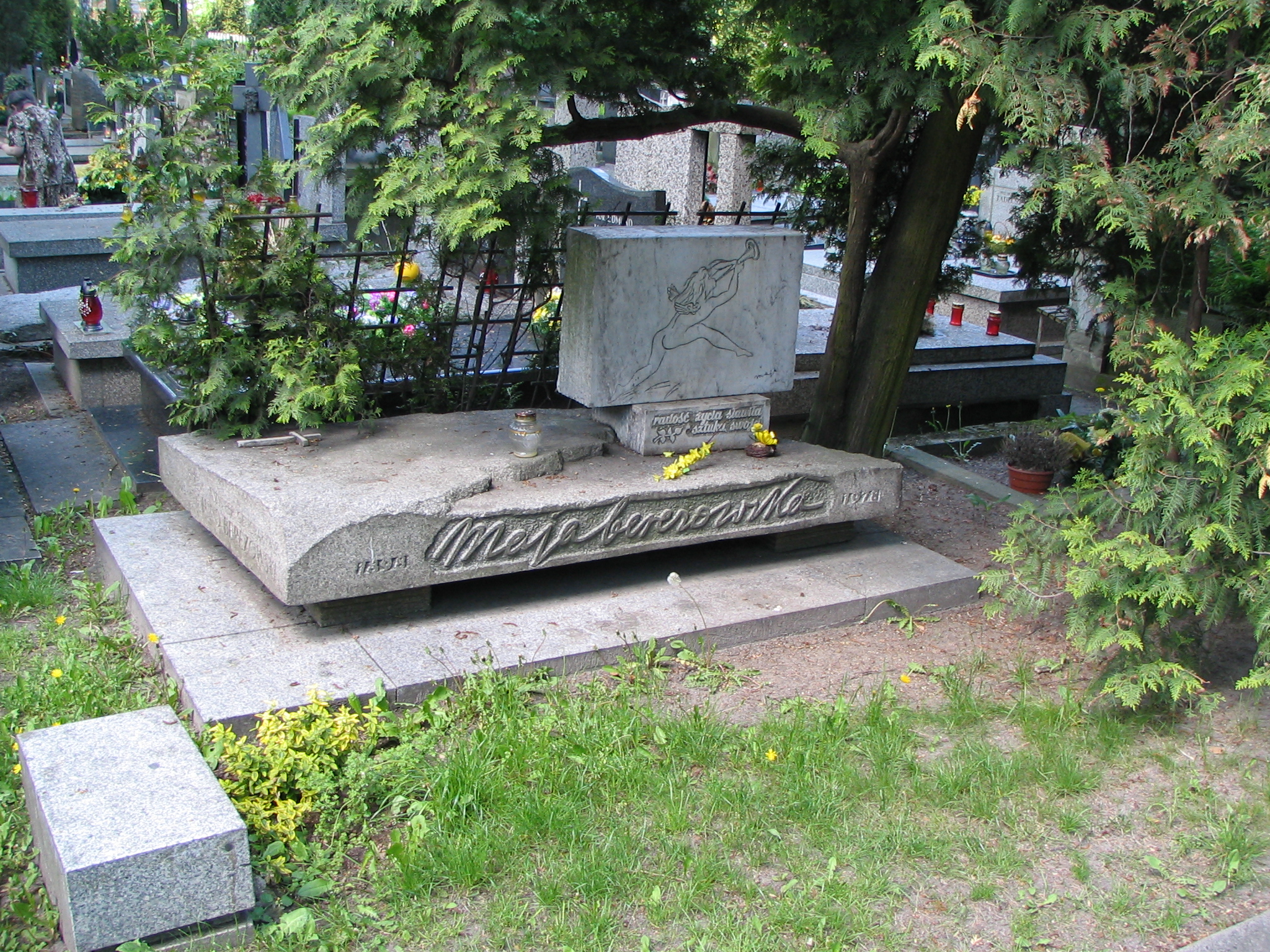
Grave of Maja Berezowska

Maja Berezowska ( Born 13 April, 1893 in Baranowicze – 31 May, 1978, in Warsaw) was a Polish painter.

Berezowska was born in Baranowicze, in the Minsk Governorate of the Russian Empire (present-day Belarus), to Polish parents Edmund Berezowski, who was an engineer and general, and Janina Berezowska née Przecławska who studied in Saint Petersburg, Kraków and Munich.

From 1933 to 1936 she lived in Paris and worked with magazines such as "Le Figaro", "Le Rire" and "Ici Paris". She made a few caricature cartoons of Adolf Hitler which resulted in the official protest of the German Embassy in Paris, who sued Berezowska. She appeared in court but escaped having to pay any fine. However, the German Nazis remembered her "outrage". After her return to Poland and the outbreak of World War II she was imprisoned at Pawiak, and later - with the death sentence - sent and imprisoned in the Ravensbrück concentration camp. After the liberation of the Ravensbrück camp by the Soviet forces, she left with a group of other Polish women. She first lived in for Stockholm and a year and later, in 1946, returned to Poland and settled in Warsaw.
