= Baranavichy Ghetto =

Ghetto in Baranavichy, Belarus

Coordinates: 53°7′47″N 26°0′47″E

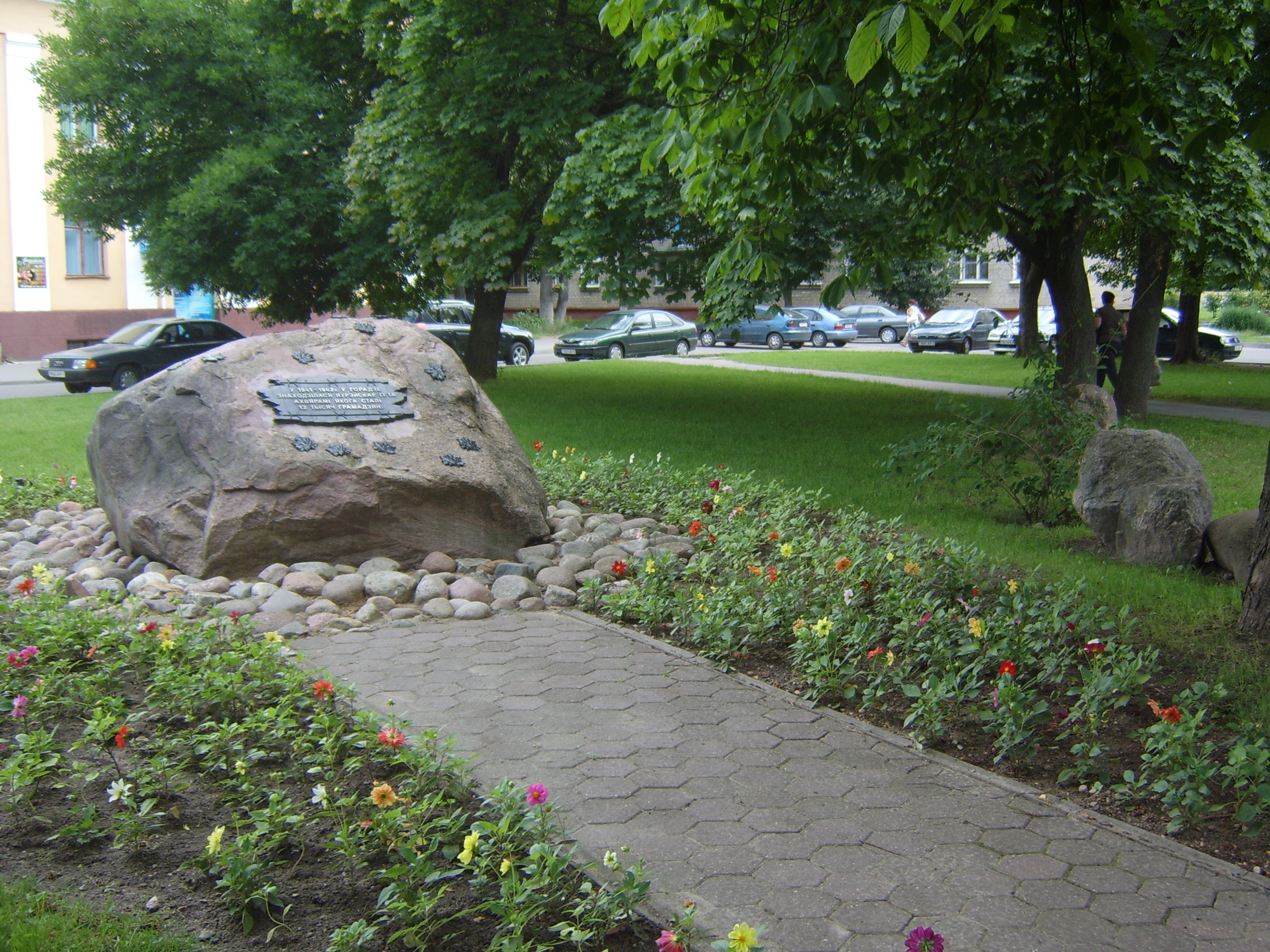
Memorial stone at the site of the main gate of the former Baranovichi ghetto. It is located at the T-shaped intersection of Gritsevets and Tsaryuk streets, behind the House of Officers.

Baranavichy Ghetto was a ghetto created in August 1941 in Baranavichy, Belarus, with 8,000 to 12,000 Jews suffering from terrible conditions in six buildings. From March 4 to December 14, 1942, Germans killed nearly all of the Jews in the ghetto. Only about 250 survived the war, some of whom were helped by Hugo Armann, head of a unit that arranged travel for soldiers and security police. He saved six people from a murder squad and another 35 to 40 people who worked for him. Edward Chacza coordinated escapes with Armann and others so that Jews would meet up with partisan groups in the forest. He also provided food and arms.

== Background ==
External image
- Group portrait of the Tec family in Baranovichi before The Holocaust, c. 1910 - 1920

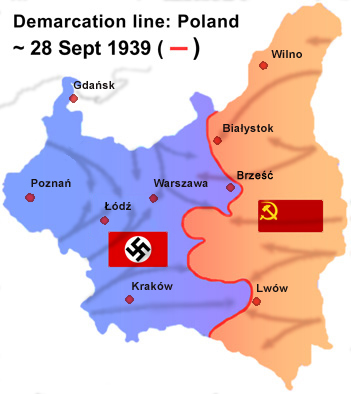
Temporary borders created by advancing German and Soviet troops

Baranavichy (also spelled Baranowicze), a city in Poland, was surrounded by forests. Between 1882 and 1903, Jews could only live on the outskirts of town. In 1897, it was a village of 2,171 Jews and 4,692 total population, established at a railroad junction, of the Lipawa-Romny and Moscow-Brześć railroads. In 1904, members of the Jewish community established a local chapter of the Bund political movement to improve workplace safety. Jews established factories, large shops, windmills, and wholesale trading firms in the growing city. Relationships between the Jewish community and gentiles vacillated in the early 20th century. Around the time of World War I, there was aggression toward Jews, who became fearful of how they might be impacted by social and political changes. During the interwar period, Jews experienced a renewal of cultural and economic opportunities and held positions in the local government.

Six thousand six hundred and five Jews lived in Baranavichy in 1921. They were 57.5% of the total population. Jews worked in the food, resort, and lumber industries. Hasidic Jewish rabbis established themselves in Baranavichy after World War I. They were of the Koidanov and Slonim dynasties. The community provided Yiddish, Hebrew, and yeshivot schools. By 1928, there were six daily newspapers. Some Jews joined youth movements and Zionist organizations.

In 1939, the city became part of the Soviet Union, which nationalized the economy and resulted in changes to the Jew's way of life by abolishing youth, political, cultural, and communal groups and events. A decree was issued by the Soviets to send wealthy capitalists to Siberia. In September 1939, another part was occupied by Germany. Baranavichy and its factories were located within the part of Poland that the Soviet Union occupied.

== German invasion ==
Hitler invaded the Soviet Union, and began bombing Baranavichy, in the summer of 1941, violating the Molotov–Ribbentrop pact. The Germans occupied Baranavichy on June 27, 1941, (Note: Or, the Germans occupied Baranavichy on June 25, 1942.) a group that included soldiers, civil administration authorities, and Schutzstaffel (SS) personnel. The city was made part of the General Commissariat Belarus in the Reichskommissariat Ostland. The Germans began to implement laws and pogroms against the Jews. In July 1941, the Einsatzgruppen (mobile death squads), led by Otto Bradfisch, killed 350 Jews. The Jews were forced to pay 100,000 roubles to the Germans. Germans rationed food, and the Jews' allotments were insufficient. Some Jews formed resistance groups around the spring of 1942, that merged to become the Fighting Organization.

A local Judenrat was established for the ghetto by the Nazis and led by Izykson. The ghetto was established on December 12, 1941. The Jewish residents, up to 12,000 people, were moved into the fenced ghetto. (Note: The total number of exterminated Jews may have been between 8,000 and 12,000 people. Not all of the inhabitants of the ghetto were from Baranavichy. Some were Jews who were relocated to the ghetto from other areas of Poland.) The population was divided between those who could perform forced labor and those who could not. Those able to perform forced labor were issued certificates that they were productive Jews. The rest were exterminated. Some of the forced laborers died at the Koldichevo concentration camp.

The Einsatzgruppen (mobile death squads) killed Jews in the ghetto in three "actions", as ordered by Rudolph Werner, territorial commissioner (Reichskommissar of Generalbezirk Weissruthenien). The first action occurred on March 3 and 4, 1942, when 3,400 young, old people, and otherwise unable to perform forced labor were murdered in front of trenches dug for a mass grave. (Note: There are reports that as many as 6,000 Jews were killed in this action.) The German Security Police (Sicherheitspolizei (SiPo)) led the effort that entailed Latvian, Lithuanian as well as Belarusian police. Another 3,000 or 5,000 people were murdered over ten days, beginning September 22, 1942, by the SiPo and Nazi Security Service (Sicherheitsdienst (SD)). During the last action, 3,000 to 7,000 Jews died on December 17, 1942. (Note: Or, the last action took place on or beginning December 12, 1942.) By December 1942, the city was considered judenfrei, free of Jews. There were a few Jews who were forced-laborers who continued to reside in the Baranavichy ghetto. Most of the remaining people were killed in 1943.

=== Edward Chacza ===
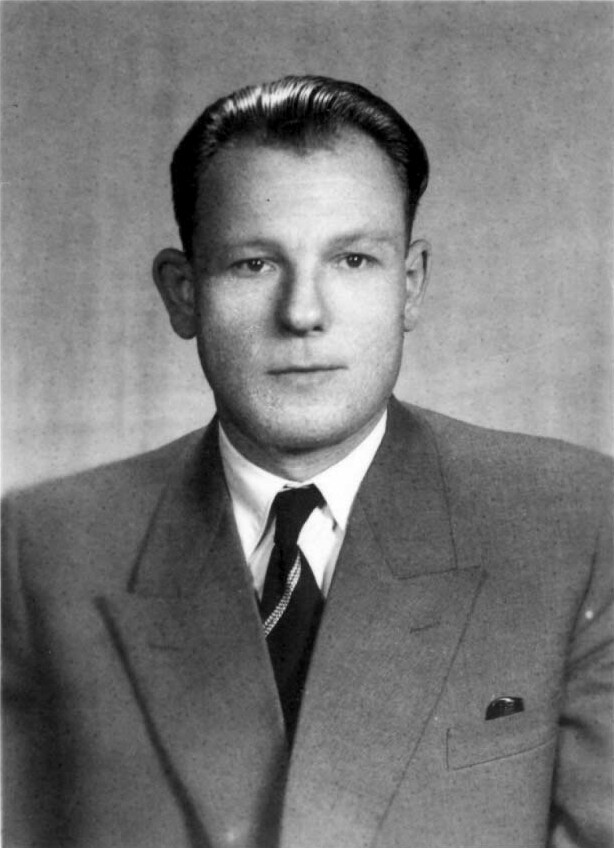
Edward Chacza

Edward Chacza, born in 1918, was a Polish Roman Catholic miner who lived and had a family in Baranavichy by World War II. When the Germans occupied the Baranavichy area, Chacza helped Jews escape from the cloistered ghetto and into the forests. He aided Jews by providing temporary shelter, medical care, and food, as well as connecting escapees with Jewish partisan groups in the woods. Sergeant Major Hugo Armann coordinated with Chacza when he had Jewish people who were escaping the Nazis.

As a rescuer, he was at risk of arrest or death. In November 1943, he was arrested. The number of people he saved is unknown, but the people that Chacza is known to have rescued include Arje Sosnowski, Chajim Stolowicki, Sonia Szac, Mosze Topf, Moske Tunkel, Michael Zahavi, as well as people with the surnames Jankielewicz, Jacobi, Lipnik, Roitman, Szereszewski, and Sternfeld. Chacza remained in contact with Jewish partisan groups and people he had saved, most of whom immigrated to Israel after the war. Chacza received the title Righteous Among the Nations on March 24, 1964. Chacza participated in a tree ceremony held at Yad Vashem.

=== Brana and Monik Dowkowski ===
Monik Dowkowski, Brana (Bronią) Zablotska, and several dozen people — in their twenties or thirties — escaped the ghetto in September 1942, probably when Nazis killed 30 members of Brana's family and buried them in a mass grave. Edward Chacza gave the group of refugees firearms and had them taken into the surrounding forests. The group joined a Soviet partisan group. Brana, a Slonimer Hasidic Jew, and Monik, whose father was a follower of the Revisionist Zionist leader Ze'ev Jabotinsky, were married after the war and immigrated to the United States. Brana's friend, Sonia Shainwald Orbuch published the book Here, There Are No Sarahs about her experiences during The Holocaust.

=== Renia Berzak ===
External audio
- Renia Berzak interviewed by Brad Zarlin, 2008, United States Holocaust Memorial Museum

Renia Berzak, born in 1925 in Baranavichy, grew up in a wealthy family and interacted with Jewish and Gentile people. When the Red Army occupied the city, the Soviets took personal goods from her family's house. Her family was exiled to a neighboring village, where they lived until the Germans occupied Poland in the summer of 1941. Her father was immediately murdered. Berzak and her family were forced by the Germans to move into the Baranavichy Ghetto and she was assigned to a forced-labor work detail to clean a German garage. One day in 1942, while she was at work, her siblings — Feigele, Hanale, and Samuel — were killed by the Germans. They had been overheard reciting the Shema Yisrael prayer. Berzak and her mother Leah, who escaped the massacre, were taken in by a gentile family for 22 months. They first stayed in a cold barn and then in a bunker under the house's floorboards, where they did not have room to move. After the Red Army liberated Baranavichy, Berzak married Peter Berzak, a Russian partisan during the war. They immigrated to Palestine and established a family there. They lived in South Africa and Canada before settling in Houston, Texas in the United States, where she was a Holocaust Museum Houston volunteer.

=== Ya'akov G. ===
Ya'akov G., born in 1924 in Kletsk, Poland (now Belarus), witnessed the horrors of The Holocaust and hid in the forests and a bunker before coming to the Baranavichy ghetto. Ya'akov and other members of an armed group escaped the ghetto and went into the woods. A member of a Jewish partisan group, they fought against the Germans, including blowing up train tracks and killing Germans. In 1943, he acquired additional weaponry when the Soviets performed airdrops. He saw several partisans killed by the Nazis. Ya'akov was drafted into the Soviet Red Army and served in Lyakhavichy. After escaping capture by the Germans, Ya'akov returned to his home after the end of the war and found that all of his family had been killed. He emigrated to Palestine, married, and was drafted into the Israel armed forces.

=== Rachel Pinchusowitch Litwak ===
Rachel Pinchusowitch Litwak, born in Baranavichy in 1923, was the daughter of a Jewish factory owner. She lived with her parents and five brothers and sisters. Before the war, a brother and a sister immigrated to Palestine and the United States. When the city was bombed, the family sought shelter in a small town, and they returned to find that their home was destroyed. Litwak, given a certificate that she was a productive worker, and her sister Osnat, washed clothing for the Signal Corps, whose soldiers would give the girls some of their food. She and her mother washed clothes and cleaned for soldiers and nurses who treated wounded soldiers.

Litwak and her mother were led with other members of their work detail to a large open area one day. Her German escort realized the danger and told his detail to walk quickly away without looking back. Loud music was played, and then soldiers began shooting the assembled Jews, one of whom was her brother Eliezer. Her sister Osnat was soon after murdered by the Schutzstaffel (SS). Litwak's uncle Mordechai had gone into the forest to hide. At her parents' urging, Litwak escaped on December 10, 1942, and found Edward Chacza, a Polish gentile who arranged for her to be taken to her uncle, who lived in a hut with his family in the swamps near Wielkie Luki. After living there for a while, they escaped an attack by German soldiers and were led to a man named Neckolsky, who was the leader of a Russian partisan camp. They lived in a hut in the camp and lived and ate as part of the primitive community. Litwak survived further attacks by the Germans and returned to Baranavichy after the Russian Red Army liberated Baranavichy on July 8, 1944. She took over one of the few remaining houses her family owned and acquired a job as a personnel director. The rest of her family, who had remained in Baranavichy, died during The Holocaust. Litwak later moved to Israel, established a family there, and wrote the book Remember the Past, You are the Future.

=== Other ===
A Jewish man kept a diary of his experiences of The Holocaust, including when the Germans occupied Baranavichy in 1941 and then committed mass killings of Jews. The man escaped the ghetto and fled into the forest. The journal recorded his life events through 1945, recording his settlement in Palestine after traveling through Italy and Israel. Handwritten in Yiddish, the diary is in the collection of the United States Holocaust Memorial Museum.

== Liberation ==
External images
- View of the destruction of Baranovichi, July 1944
- Jewish survivors from Baranovichi at a ceremony commemorating the 3,000 Jews murdered on March 4, 1942., 1944

The Russian Army liberated Baranavichy on July 8, 1944. By that time, the houses and buildings in the city had been destroyed. About 250 former residents survived, 150 or fewer returned from the forest, and others returned from forced labor camps and the Soviet Union.

== Memorials ==
The survivors created monuments for the 12,000 people who had died during The Holocaust and had a mass burial of the personal effects found of the people who had died. It was not long before the memorials were defaced. Besides a memorial stone at Tsaryuka Street, an obelisk was erected by Jews in Israel and around the world in 1992 at the former Jewish cemetery.
