= Hugo Armann =

German Army officer

- Born: 17 August 1917; Rauenstein, Saxe-Weimar-Eisenach, Germany
- Died: 9 May 1989 (aged 71)
- Occupations: Soldier, teacher
- Known for: Member of Hitler Youth program but saved Jews during The Holocaust

Hugo Armann (11 August 1917 – 9 May 1989) was a German army officer, teacher, and rescuer of Jewish people during the Holocaust. His parents were anti-Nazi, but for a short time Armann was in the Hitler Youth program. Armann was increasingly upset by the treatment of Jews during the persecution and pogroms against Jews. He was able to use his position as a head of a unit that arranged travel for soldiers and security police to protect and provide food for Jewish people. He saved six people from a murder squad and another 35 to 40 people who worked for him. He received the title of Righteous Among the Nations in 1985 for his contributions during the Holocaust.

== Pre-war life ==
Armann was born 11 August 1917 in Rauenstein, a village of Frankenblick, Thuringia. His parents were Protestants who had Jewish friends throughout their lifetime. Although his parents were anti-Nazi, Armann was a member of the Hitler Youth, but left the organization after a short time. Armann went to college to become a teacher.

Armann watched the events leading up to the Holocaust and concluded that "Everybody knew the Jews weren't being shipped to paradise." He stated that someone had to be aware to recognize the trend of events for Jews, like Kristallnacht (The Night of Broken Glass) on 9 to 10 November 1938. Jews were required to wear yellow star-shaped badges that identified them as Jews. Jews were lined up at railroad stations to be deported. And, information was spread about concentration camps. Armann says that ignorance is not an answer for people who would not help the Jews.

== World War II ==
Armann was drafted about 1939, when he was 22. By the spring of 1942, Armann was a sergeant major (hauptfeldwebel) in the Nazi armed forces Wehrmacht. Posted at the railway station in Baranavichy, Belorussia, he managed a team that arranged for travel for security police and soldiers on leave. His unit controlled travel to and from police stations, military installations, and "Jewish workshops overseen by the SD", Sicherheitsdienst, the intelligence agency of Nazi Germany.

Initially, he was able to employ Jewish workers, who he protected from harm. Having heard of an upcoming Aktion on 20 September 1942, to round up and deport Jews, he hid 19-year-old Sarah Czazkes-Manishevitz, a kitchen worker and fellow Jews, in his house for a week. He kept them in his attic through the final Aktion, where 3,000 more Jews were killed and the Baranavichy Ghetto for Jews was destroyed. The final "liquidation" of the ghetto occurred on December 17, 1942. He was not able to hide Jews after that date. But he had connections, like the Polish partisan Edward Chacza, to help Jews escape and Armann provided refugees with weapons. Approximately 12,000 Jews from Baranavichy were exterminated.

Czazkes-Manishevitz's relatives were in forced labor camps and Armann tracked them down and helped them and two more people escape, too. They met in the forest outside of the town. (Note: During the war, there were about 450 Jews from Baranavichy who hid in the forest.) He saved between 35 and 40 Jews who worked for him. He saved another six men from Belorussia from murder squads. Armann provided ten rifles and ammunition for several Jewish mechanics who later escaped. He also provided food to the people he was helping. Armann made it safely through the war, although ten or more German soldiers were aware of what he was doing to help Jews. In 1944, Armann was transferred to France, where he was wounded by shrapnel.

== After the war ==
Armann taught school in the town of Detter after the war and he became headmaster of a primary school. Czazkes-Manishevitz survived and stayed in contact with Armann after the war. Armann also helped Dr. A. Sternfeld, Czazkes-Manishevitz's brother-in-law, who also maintained contact with him after the war. Hugo Armann died on 9 May 1989.

He received the title of Righteous Among the Nations on 5 September 1985. A ceremony was held by Yad Vashem. In September 1986, Armann planted a tree at Yad Vashem on the Avenue of the Righteous. Questioning if we had done enough or did too much, he said, "I helped human beings at a time when they were not being treated like human beings.

== Bibliography ==
- Silver, Eric (1992). The book of the just : the silent heroes who saved Jews from Hitler. London : Weidenfeld and Nicolson. ISBN 978-0-8021-1347-4.
