= Ishkildino =

Ishkildino Ишкильдино
- Village
- Location within Bashkortostan Location within Russia
- Coordinates: 53°25′N 58°17′E
- Country: Russia
- Region: Bashkortostan
- District: Abzelilovsky District
- Time zone: UTC+5:00

Ishkildino (Russian: Ишкильдино; Bashkir: Ишкилде, İşkilde) is a rural locality (a village) in Burangulovsky Selsoviet, Abzelilovsky District, Bashkortostan, Russia. The population was 234 as of 2010. There are 7 streets.

== Geography ==
Ishkildino is located 34 km northwest of Askarovo (the district's administrative centre) by road. Saitkulovo is the nearest rural locality.
