= Koldichevo =

Coordinates: 53.2807°N 26.0488°E

Koldichevo (Kaldyčava/Koldychevo/Kołdyczewo) was the site of a Nazi concentration camp 16 kilometres (10 mi) north of Baranovichi, Belarus. About 22,000 people, mostly Jews, were killed in the camp between 1942 and 1944. The murders in the camp were done as part of The Holocaust in the Baranavichy District.

== History ==
The Koldichevo concentration camp was built early in the summer of 1942, about 18 km from Baranovichi, in the village of Kałdyčeva, on the road to Novogrudok, in German-occupied West Belarus. A prisoner described it as "a sad collection of concrete buildings and overworked farmland, with dilapidated barns, animal stalls, and tool sheds [...] partitioned with an endless fence of barbed wire to create a makeshift prison."

The camp was used to imprison Soviet prisoners of war, Polish and Belarusian partisans, and Jews from Gorodishche, Dziatłava, Novogrudok, Stoŭbcy, and Baranovichi. Few prisoners survived the harsh conditions of the camp.

In March 1944, the surviving population of about 100 Jews, led by Shlomo Kushnir (or Kushner), drilled a hole in the wall of their barracks, cut through the electrical fence surrounding the camp, and escaped into the moonless night. Twenty-four prisoners were recaptured, including Kushnir, who committed suicide. Many of the rest joined up with the Bielski partisans in the Naliboki forest.

On June 29, 1944, with Soviet troops approaching as part of Operation Bagration, the Koldichevo camp was liquidated. 2,000 of the remaining prisoners were shot in a pit beneath a mound. Another 300 were evacuated to Germany.

Some of the former policemen who served at the camp were arrested after the war and sentenced by military tribunals in Wrocław (1957) and Minsk (1962). In 1992, Sergis Hutyrczyk, a security guard who had immigrated to the United States in 1954, was identified as a guard from the camp at Koldichevo, accused of lying about his wartime activities and stripped of his U.S. citizenship. He died in 1993 while appealing his denaturalization.

== See also ==
- German Resistance to Nazism
- Glossary of Nazi Germany
- The Holocaust
- List of books about Nazi Germany
- List of concentration and internment camps
- List of Nazi-German concentration camps
- Nazi concentration camps
- Nazi Party
- Nazi songs
- World War II
