= Baranavichy =

City in Brest Region, Belarus

Baranavichy Баранавічы (Belarusian) Барановичи (Russian)
- City
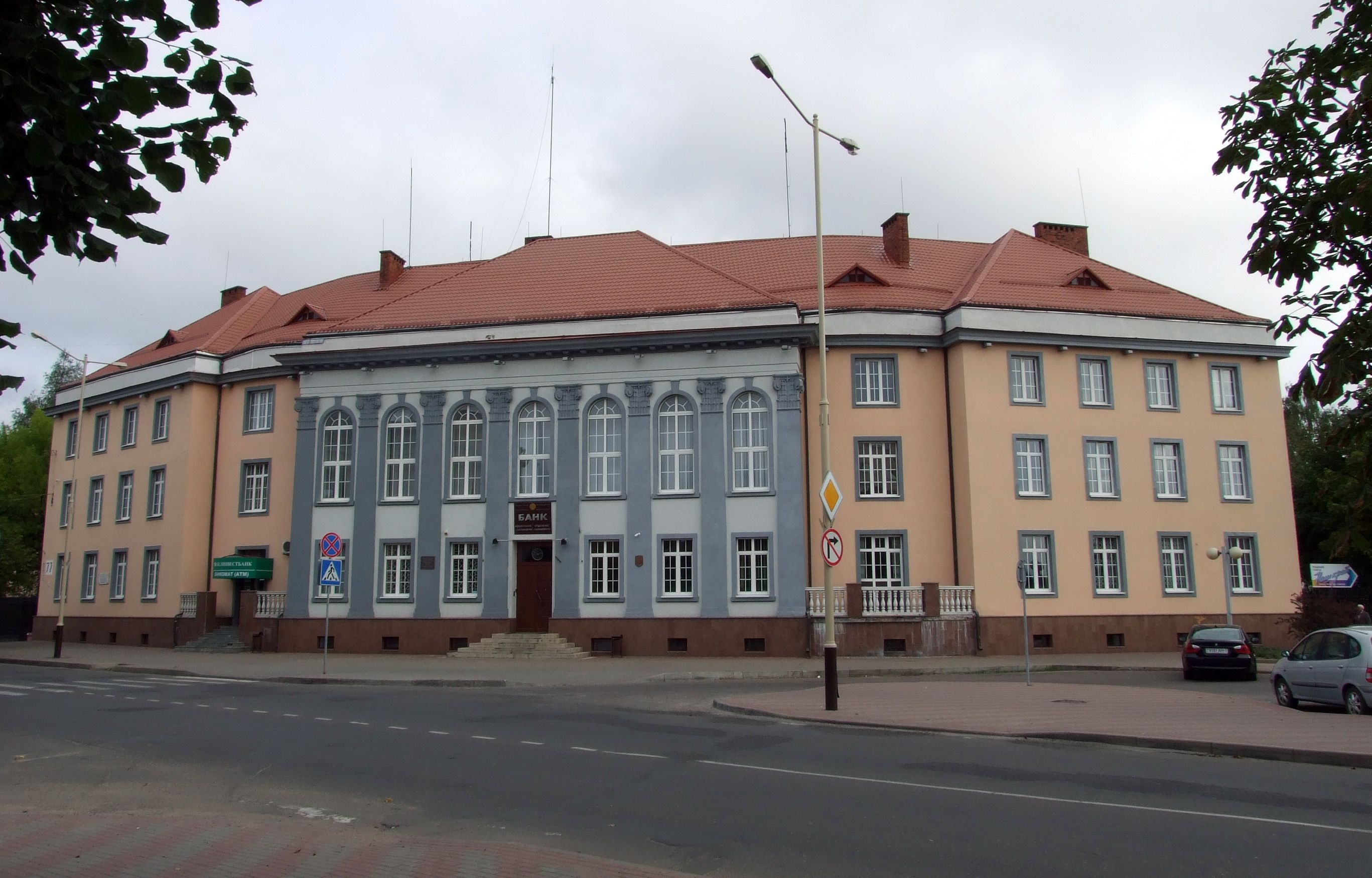
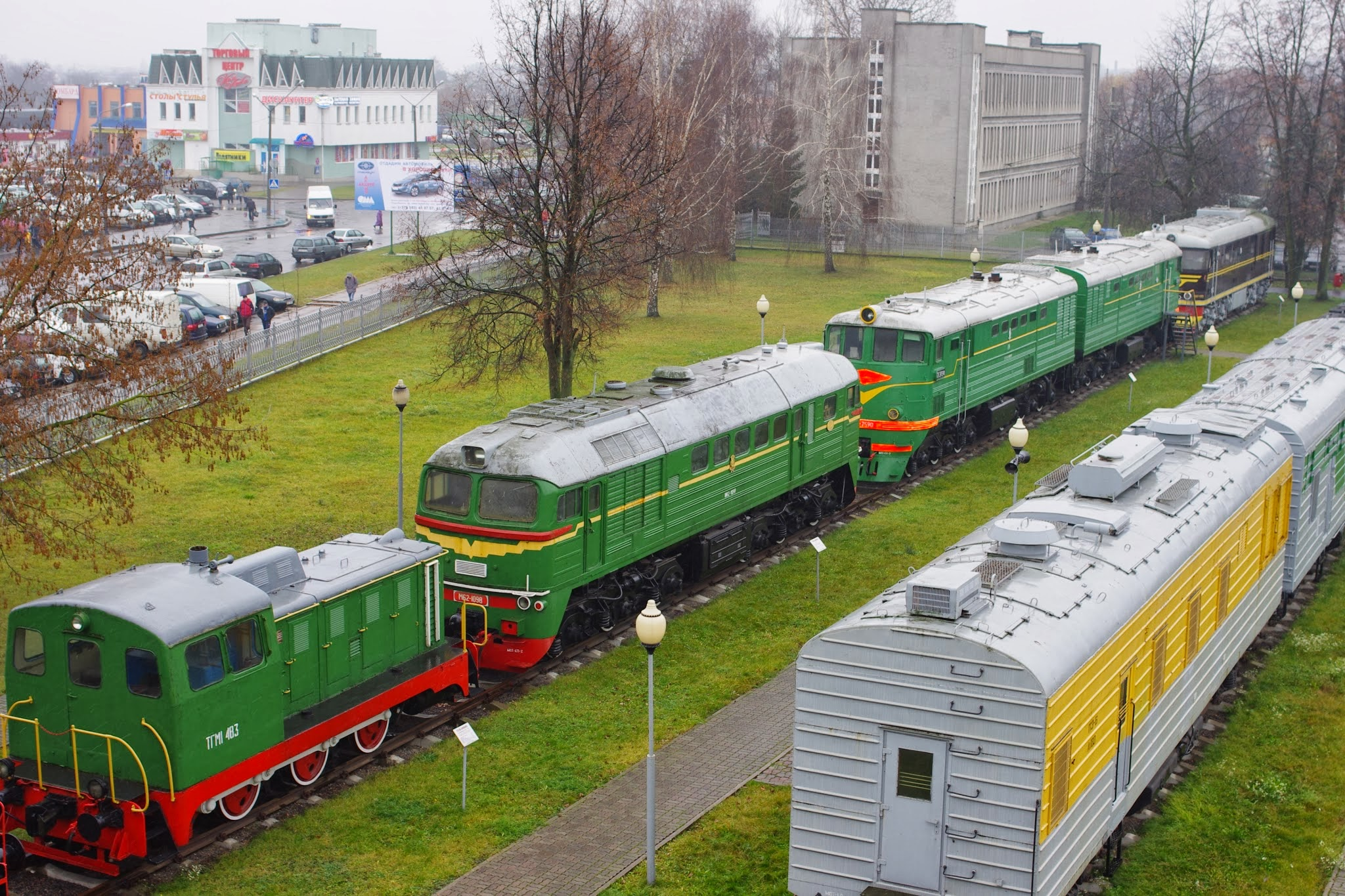
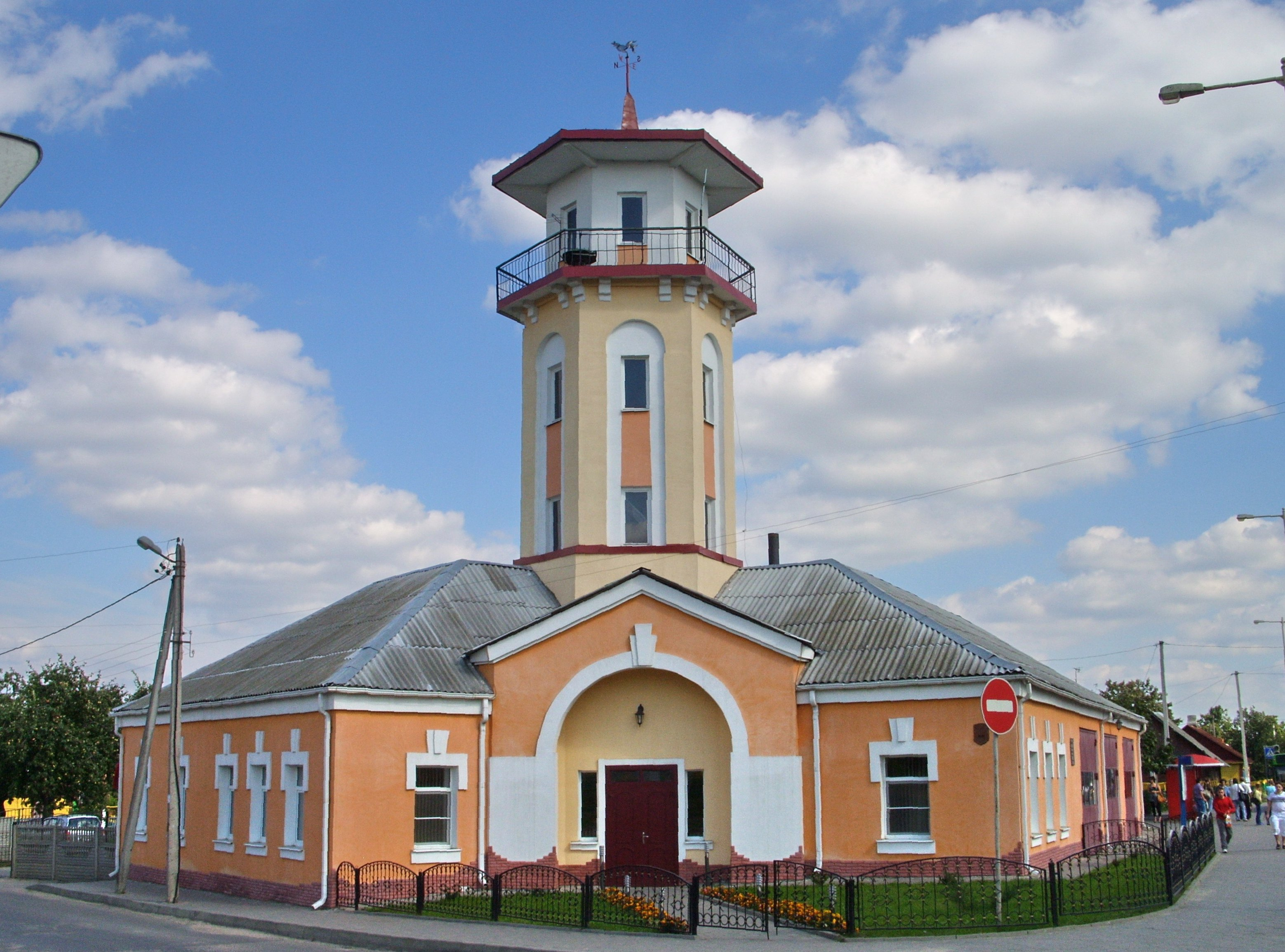
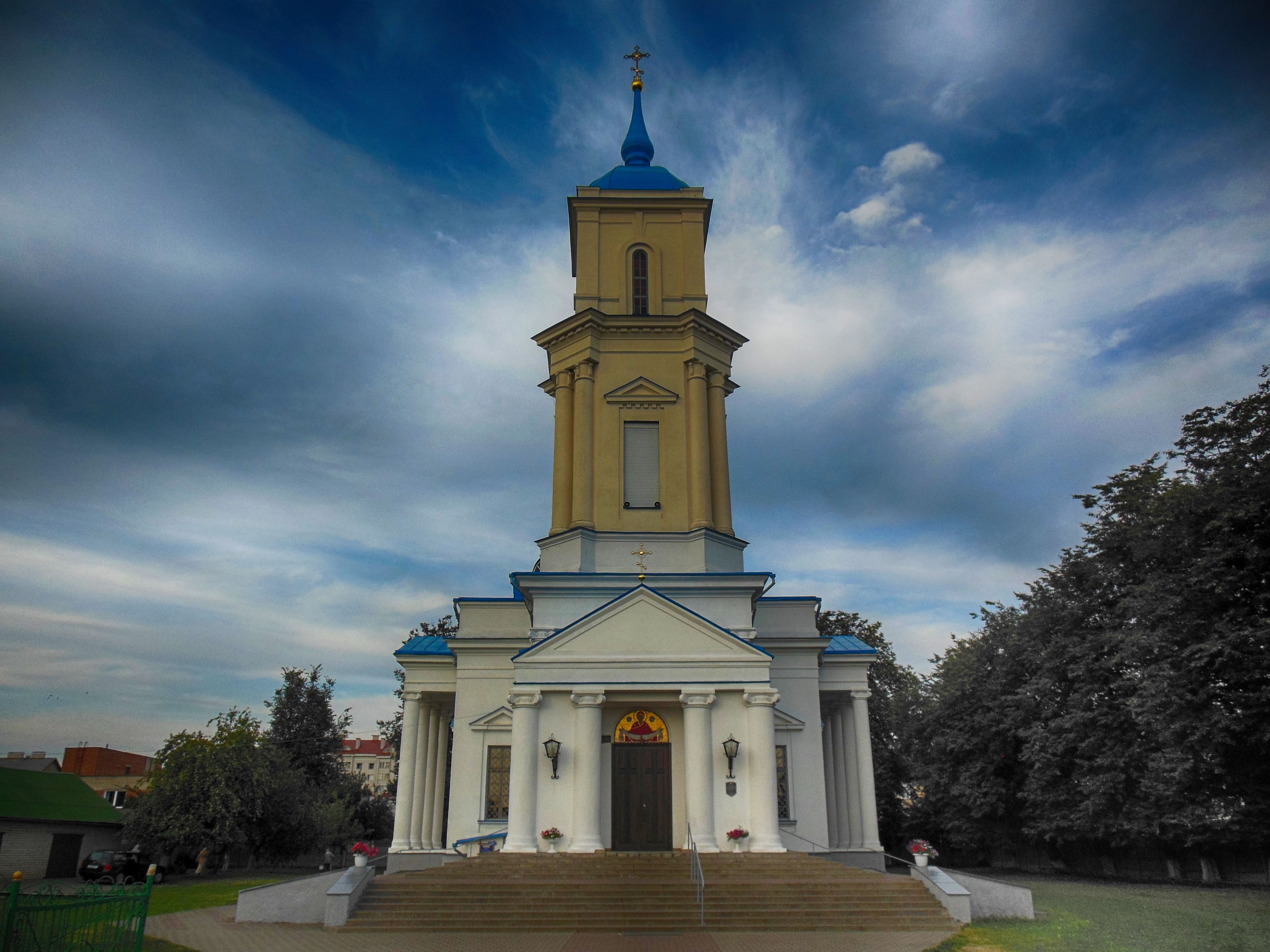
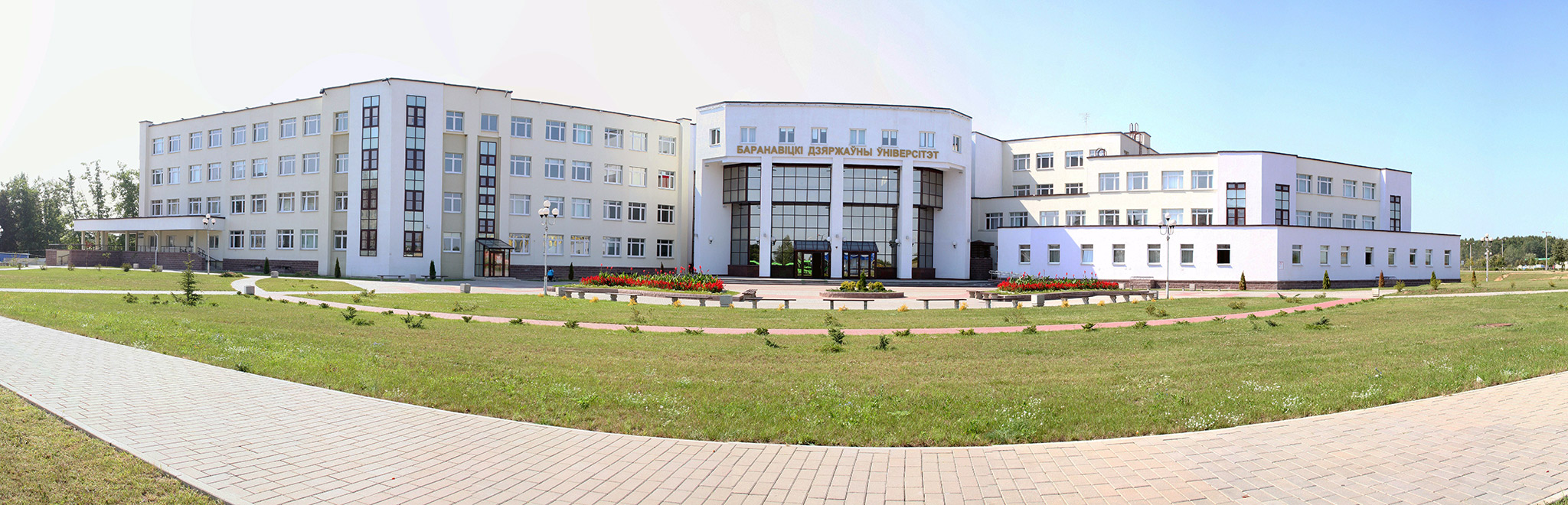
- Old Bank of Poland Railway museum Fire station Protection Church Baranavichy State University

- Flag Coat of arms

- Location in Belarus
- Coordinates: 53°08′N 26°01′E
- Country: Belarus
- Region: Brest Region
- First mentioned: 1706
- City status: 1919

Area
  - Total: 53.64 km^{2} (20.71 sq mi)
- Elevation: 193 m (633 ft)

Population (2026)
  - Total: 170,039
  - Density: 3,170/km^{2} (8,210/sq mi)
- Time zone: UTC+3 (MSK)
- Postal code: 225320
- Area code: +375 (0)163
- Vehicle registration: 1
- Website: www.baranovichy.by

Baranavichy, or Baranovichi, (Note: /bəˈrɑːnəvɪtʃi/ bə-RAH-nə-vitch-ee; Belarusian: Баранавічы, romanized: Baranavičy, IPA: [baˈranavʲitʂɨ]; Russian: Барановичи, romanized: Baranovichi [bɐˈranəvʲɪtɕɪ]; Yiddish: באַראַנאָוויטש; Polish: Baranowicze.) is a city in the Brest Region of western Belarus. It serves as the administrative center of Baranavichy District, though it is administratively separate from the district. As of 2026, it has a population of 170,039, making it the eighth-largest city in the country.

The city is home to an important railway junction and to Baranavichy State University. It is characterized by a favourable geographical position and is a major junction of the most important railways and highways. It is close to the main gas pipeline, has a developed system of energy and water supply, and a favourable climate. A number of large industrial enterprises are located in the city, which is one of the most important industrial, cultural, and educational centers of Belarus.

== History ==
=== Early history ===
In the second half of the 17th century, the village of Baranavichy housed a Jesuit mission. In the second half of the 18th century, Baranavichy was the property of Massalski and Niesiołowski families. The village was administratively part of the Nowogródek Voivodeship until the Third Partition of Poland (1795) when it was annexed by Imperial Russia. In the 19th century, it belonged to the Countess E.A. Rozwadowski. It was part of the Novogrodek (now Navahrudak) okrug, which was part of Slonim Governorate, the Lithuania Governorate, the Grodno Governorate and then the Minsk Governorate.

=== Growth ===
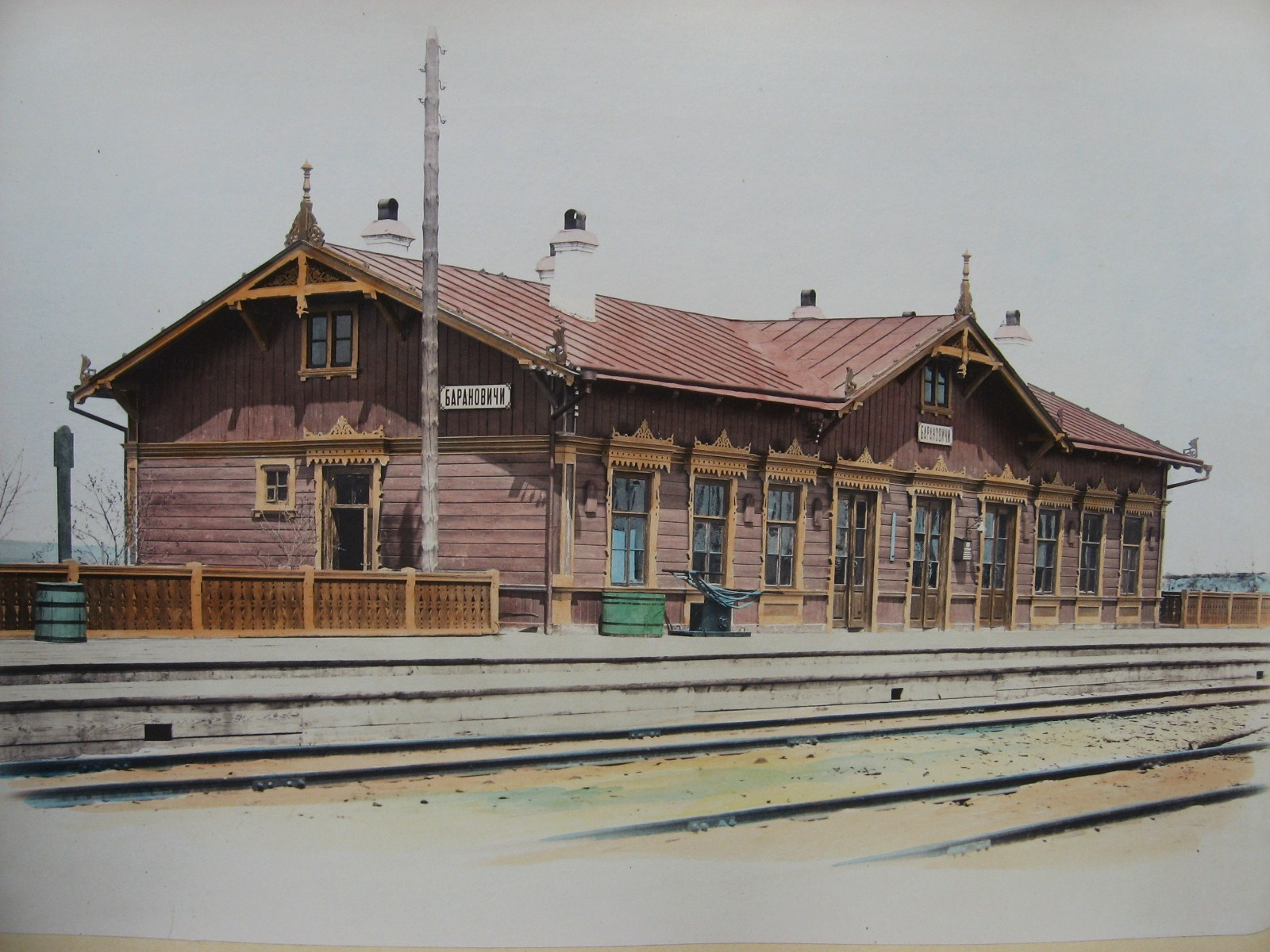
The central railway station in the late 19th century

The town's history began on 17 November 1871 (O.S., 29 N.S.), the beginning of construction of a railway line to a new section of Smolensk-Brest. The name of the station arose during the construction of the nearby village, Baranavichy, whose first mention was in the testament of A.E Sinyavskaya in 1627. Then, in 1871, not far from the station, a locomotive depot was built.

In 1874, a railway junction appeared. In the wooden station buildings lived the railway workers of Baranavichy. The new railway linked Moscow with the western outskirts of Imperial Russia.

The impetus for more intensive settlement of the areas adjacent to the station from the south was the 27 May 1884 decision by the governor of Minsk to build a town, Rozvadovo, on the lands of the landlord, Rozwadowski. The town was built according to the governor's approved plan. The contained 120 houses and 500 people.

The plans approved by Emperor Alexander III assumed that there would also be one railway linking Vilnius, Luninets, Pinsk, and Rovno. Therefore, 2.5 kilometres (1.6 mi) from the station, the Moscow-Brest railway crossed the track of the Vilnius-Rovno from Polesie railway. At the junction was another station, Baranavichy (according to Polesie Railways), which became the second centre of the city.

As before, workers and traders settled near the station. The new settlement was called New Baranavichy, unlike Rozvadovo, which became informally called Old Baranavichy. It was developed on the land owned by peasants of the villages near the new station (Svetilovichi, Gierow, and Uznogi). More convenient than the landlords' land, its lease terms and proximity to administrative agencies contributed to the rapid growth of this settlement.

=== 20th century ===
At the beginning of World War I, Baranavichy was the location for the Stavka, the headquarters of the Russian General Staff, until the Great Retreat.

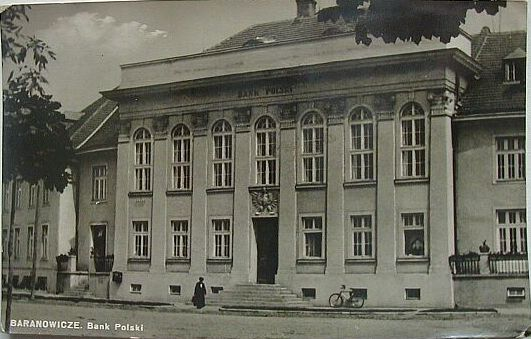
Bank of Poland in Baranowicze in the 1930s

After the settlement was left by the Germans, it was captured on 5 January 1919, by the Soviets. In the early stages of the Polish–Soviet War, it was briefly captured by the Poles on 18 March 1919 and again captured, for a longer period, in April 1919, five months after Poland regained independence. The Russians retook it on 17 July 1920, but the Poles took it again on 30 September 1920.

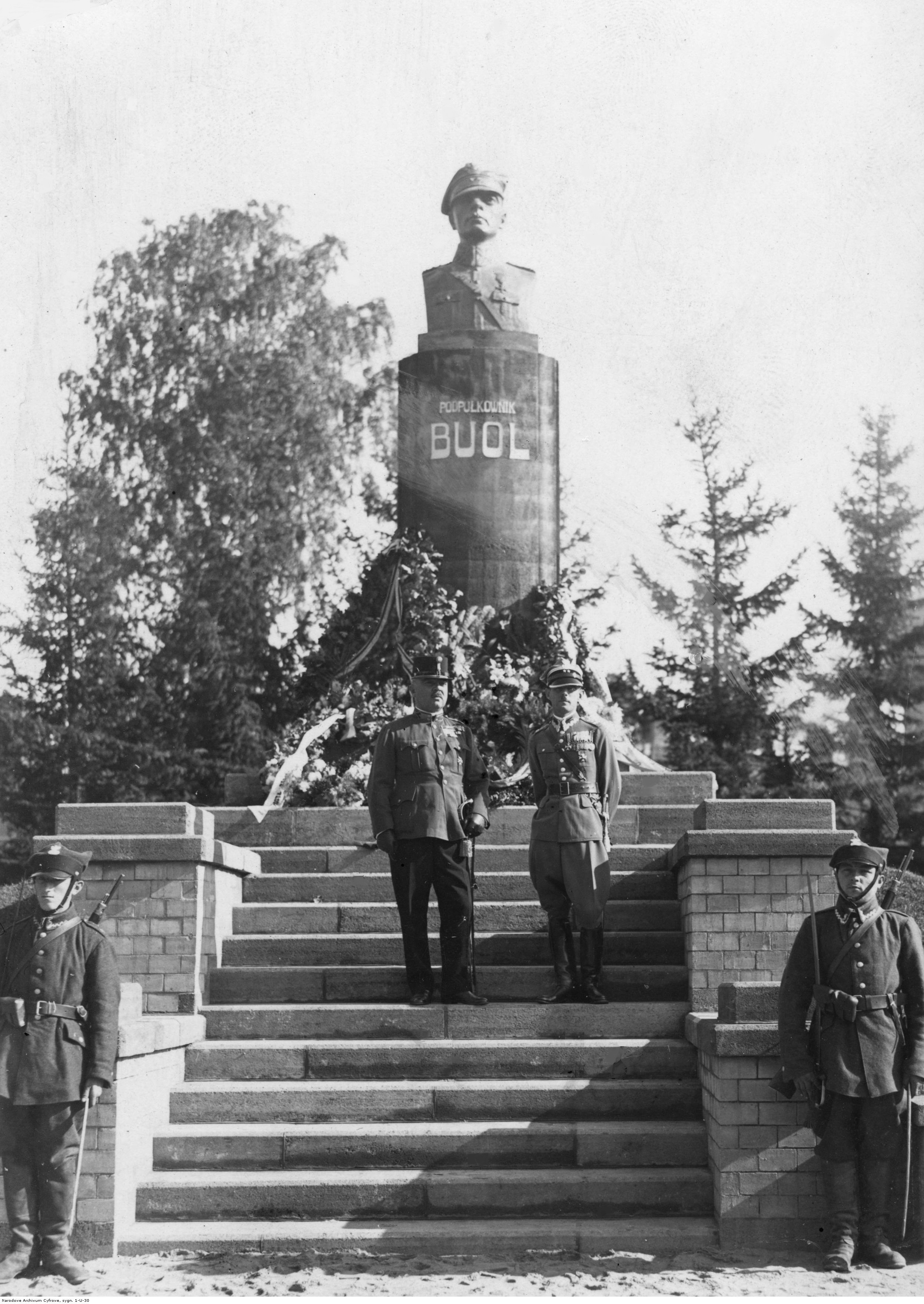
Pre-war monument of Artur Buol

On 1 August 1919, as Baranowicze, Baranavichy received city rights and became the administrative centre of a powiat in the Polish Nowogródek Voivodeship. According to the 1921 census, the city had a population of 11,471, 56.2% Jewish, 25.5% Polish, 16.6% Belarusian and 1.5% Russian. Soon, the city started to grow and became an important centre of trade and commerce for the area. The city's Orthodox cathedral was built in the Neoclassical style from 1924 to 1931 and was decorated with mosaics that had survived the demolition of the Alexander Nevsky Cathedral, Warsaw. In 1930, a monument to Hungarian Lieutenant colonel Artur Buol, a hero of Polish fights in the Polish–Soviet War, was unveiled in Baranowicze. In the interwar years, the grandparents and the father of Polish politicians Lech Kaczyński and Jarosław Kaczyński lived in Baranowicze.

The city was also an important military garrison, with a KOP Cavalry Brigade, the 20th Infantry Division and the Nowogródzka Cavalry Brigade stationed there. Because of the fast growth of local industry, a local branch of the Polish Radio was opened in 1938. In 1939 Baranavichy had almost 30,000 inhabitants and was the biggest and the most important city in the Nowogródek Voivodeship.

During the invasion of Poland at the start of World War II, the Soviet Union took the city on 17 September 1939 and annexed it to the Byelorussian Soviet Socialist Republic. The local Jewish population of 9,000 was joined by approximately 3,000 Jewish refugees from the Polish areas occupied by Germany. After the start of Operation Barbarossa, the city was seized by the Wehrmacht on 27 June 1941. It became part of Generalbezirk Weißruthenien in Reichskommissariat Ostland during the German occupation. In August 1941, the Baranavichy Ghetto was created in the city, with more than 12,000 Jews kept in terrible conditions in six buildings on the outskirts. From 4 March to 14 December 1942, the entire Jewish population of the ghetto was sent to various extermination camps and killed in gas chambers. Only about 250 survived the war. Hugo Armann, head of a unit that arranged travel for soldiers and security police, saved six people from a murder squad and another 35 to 40 people who worked for him. The Germans operated a subcamp of the Stalag 337 prisoner-of-war camp in the city.

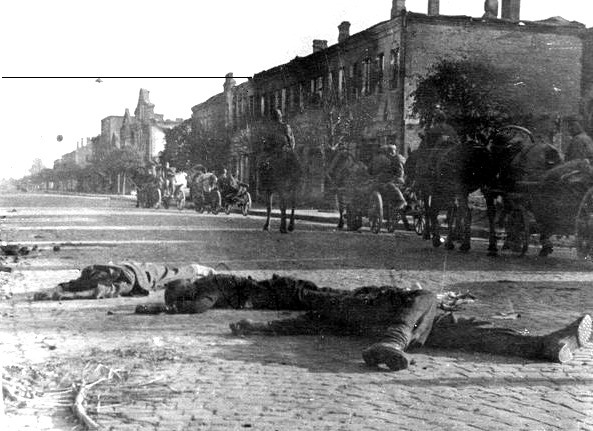
Soviet troops passing through Baranavichi, July 1944

The city was recaptured by the Red Army on 8 July 1944. It was the seat of the Baranavichy Voblast from 1939 to 1941 and again from 1944 to 1954. Meanwhile, intensive industrialization took place. In 1991, the city became part of independent Belarus.

== Demographics ==
As of 2026, it has a population of 170,039. In 2025, it had a population of 170,817.

The population density is more than 2,000 people per 1 square kilometre (0.39 sq mi).

== Geography ==
The city of Baranavichy is located on the Baranavichy Plain at the confluence of the Shchara River and a tributary, the Myshanka. The city is located on a straight line connecting the regional center Brest (206 kilometres (128 mi) distant) and Minsk (149 kilometres (93 mi)). Nearby cities include Lyakhavichy (17 kilometres (11 mi)), Slonim (42 kilometres (26 mi)), Nyasvizh (51 kilometres (32 mi)), Navahrudak (52 kilometres (32 mi)), and Hantsavichy (72 kilometres (45 mi)).

Baranavichy is located on flat terrain at an altitude of from 180 to 200 metres (590 to 660 ft) above sea level, with the altitude of the city itself being 193 metres (633 ft) above sea level. The city extends 10 kilometres (6.2 mi) from west to east, 7 kilometres (4.3 mi) from south to north, 8 kilometres (5.0 mi) from the southwest (from Brestskaya Street) to the northeast (to Fabrichnaya Street), and 6.3 kilometres (3.9 mi) from the north (Sovetskaya Street) to the southeast (Frolenkov street). The total area of the city is 80.66 square kilometres (31.14 mi^{2}; 8,066 ha), as of 12 August 2012).

The northernmost point of the city is Korolik Street, located to the north of the Baranovichsky automatic lines plant at 53°10' north latitude, and the southernmost is the village of Uznogi, located at 53°06' north latitude. The extreme western point is located in the vicinity of Badaka Street at 25°57' east longitude, and the extreme eastern point is located in the vicinity of the intersection of Egorov Street and Kashtanovaya Street at 26°04' east longitude. The geometric center of the city is Lenin Square. In total, the city has about five hundred streets and lanes with an overall length of 252.8 kilometres (157.1 mi), 129.8 kilometres (80.7 mi) of which are landscaped and 240 kilometres (150 mi) lighted.

== Climate ==
Climate data for Baranavichy (1991–2020, extremes 1940–present)
Month	Jan	Feb	Mar	Apr	May	Jun	Jul	Aug	Sep	Oct	Nov	Dec	Year
Record high °C (°F)	13.0 (55.4)	15.1 (59.2)	25.5 (77.9)	29.0 (84.2)	31.5 (88.7)	36.3 (97.3)	34.7 (94.5)	35.7 (96.3)	33.5 (92.3)	25.5 (77.9)	17.8 (64.0)	11.4 (52.5)	36.3 (97.3)
Mean daily maximum °C (°F)	−1.5 (29.3)	−0.2 (31.6)	5.2 (41.4)	13.3 (55.9)	19.1 (66.4)	22.5 (72.5)	24.4 (75.9)	24.1 (75.4)	18.2 (64.8)	11.2 (52.2)	4.3 (39.7)	−0.1 (31.8)	11.7 (53.1)
Daily mean °C (°F)	−3.8 (25.2)	−3 (27)	1.2 (34.2)	8.1 (46.6)	13.6 (56.5)	17.0 (62.6)	18.9 (66.0)	18.3 (64.9)	13.0 (55.4)	7.2 (45.0)	2.0 (35.6)	−2.2 (28.0)	7.5 (45.5)
Mean daily minimum °C (°F)	−6.0 (21.2)	−5.6 (21.9)	−2.1 (28.2)	3.3 (37.9)	8.2 (46.8)	11.8 (53.2)	13.6 (56.5)	12.9 (55.2)	8.5 (47.3)	3.9 (39.0)	0.0 (32.0)	−4.2 (24.4)	3.7 (38.7)
Record low °C (°F)	−34.5 (−30.1)	−35.4 (−31.7)	−28.8 (−19.8)	−9.6 (14.7)	−4.1 (24.6)	0.9 (33.6)	3.9 (39.0)	−0.5 (31.1)	−3.4 (25.9)	−11.2 (11.8)	−19.5 (−3.1)	−29.9 (−21.8)	−35.4 (−31.7)
Average precipitation mm (inches)	41 (1.6)	36 (1.4)	37 (1.5)	38 (1.5)	68 (2.7)	77 (3.0)	96 (3.8)	53 (2.1)	55 (2.2)	47 (1.9)	43 (1.7)	45 (1.8)	636 (25.0)
Average extreme snow depth cm (inches)	6 (2.4)	8 (3.1)	4 (1.6)	0 (0)	0 (0)	0 (0)	0 (0)	0 (0)	0 (0)	0 (0)	1 (0.4)	4 (1.6)	8 (3.1)
Average rainy days	9	7	8	11	15	15	15	12	13	14	13	10	142
Average snowy days	16	16	11	3	0.1	0	0	0	0	2	8	15	71
Average relative humidity (%)	87	84	79	69	68	73	74	73	79	83	88	89	79
Source: Pogoda.ru.net

== Transport ==
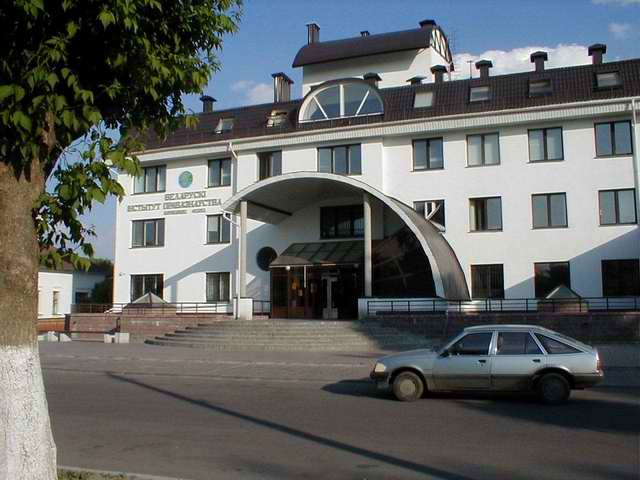
Former Baranavichy Law Institute is now a constituent part of Baranavichy State University

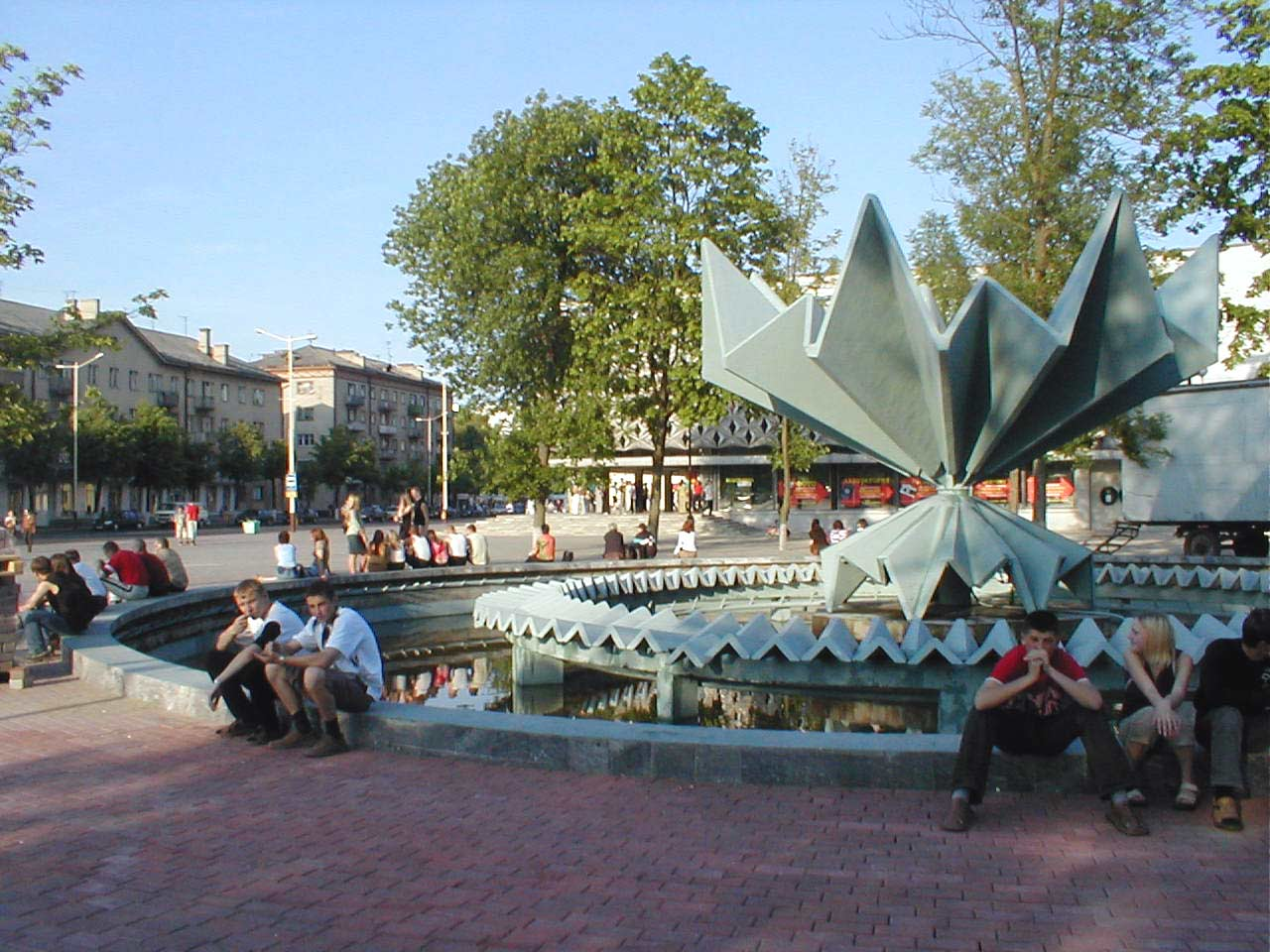
Baranavichy. Fountain at Central Square

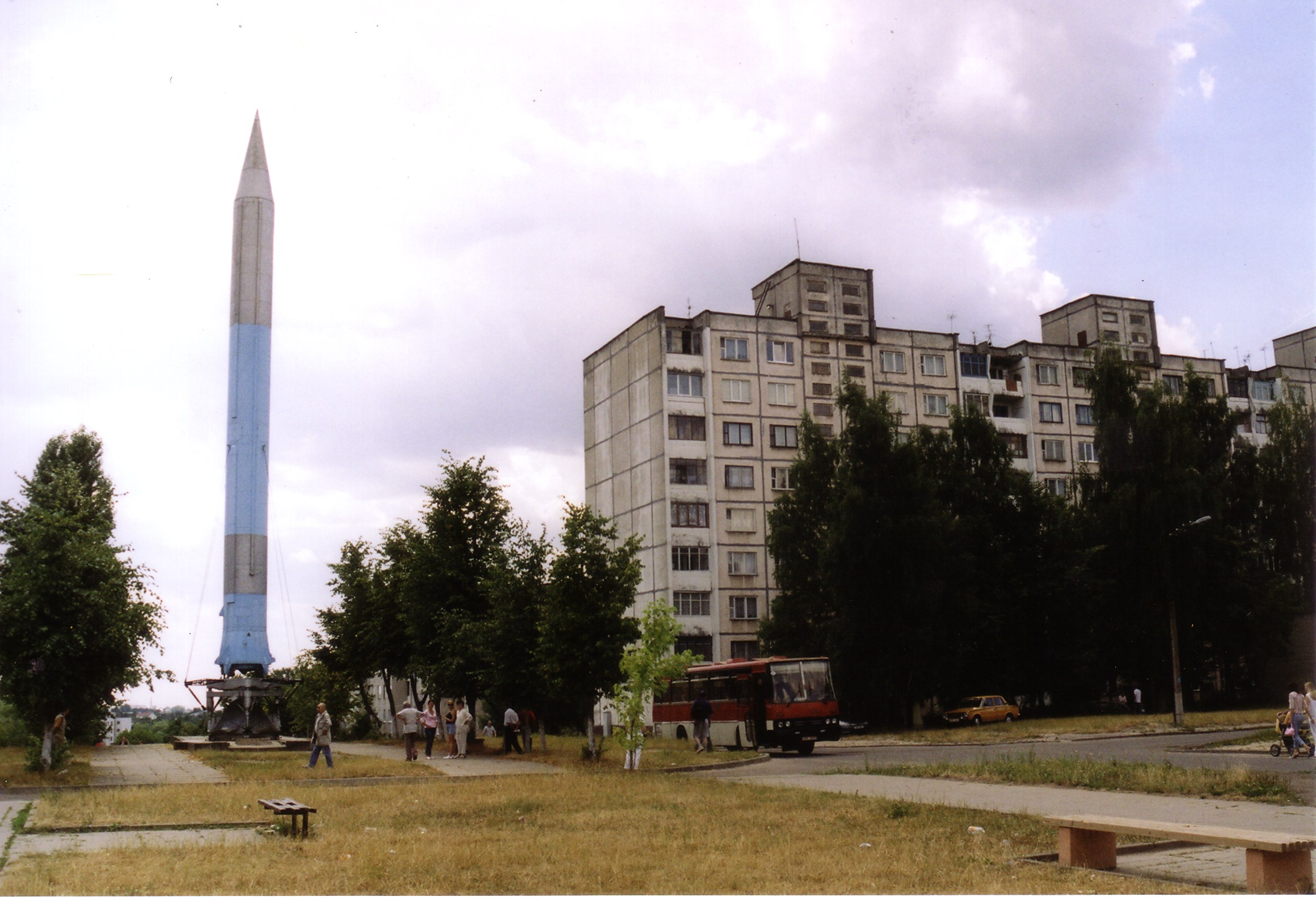
Ballistic missile on display in Baranavichy

The city is on the main east–west highway in Belarus, the M1, which forms a part of European route E30. As of 1 January 2019, 81,829 passenger cars are registered in Baranavichy. Almost every second citizen of the city owns a passenger car.

The first rail line through the city opened in around 1870. Additional railways helped the city become an important rail junction.

The large airbase, south of the city, is used by the Belarusian Air Force.

== Attractions ==
As a fairly young city, Baranavichy does not have many cultural heritage monuments. Most are buildings erected in the interwar period, including the Catholic Church of the Exaltation of the Holy Cross, the former Bank of Poland building, the building of the Polish Radio Baranowicze station, the fire station and the Orthodox Church of the Protection of the Holy Virgin. A few old houses from the early 20th century are preserved. There is a railway museum in the city.

In October 2016, a local furniture factory opened a zoological landscape park Dipriz. The 400-hectare site is home to ornamental birds and rare animals, as well as all the species of trees native to Belarus.

Tourists can also visit Baranovichi Railway Museum.

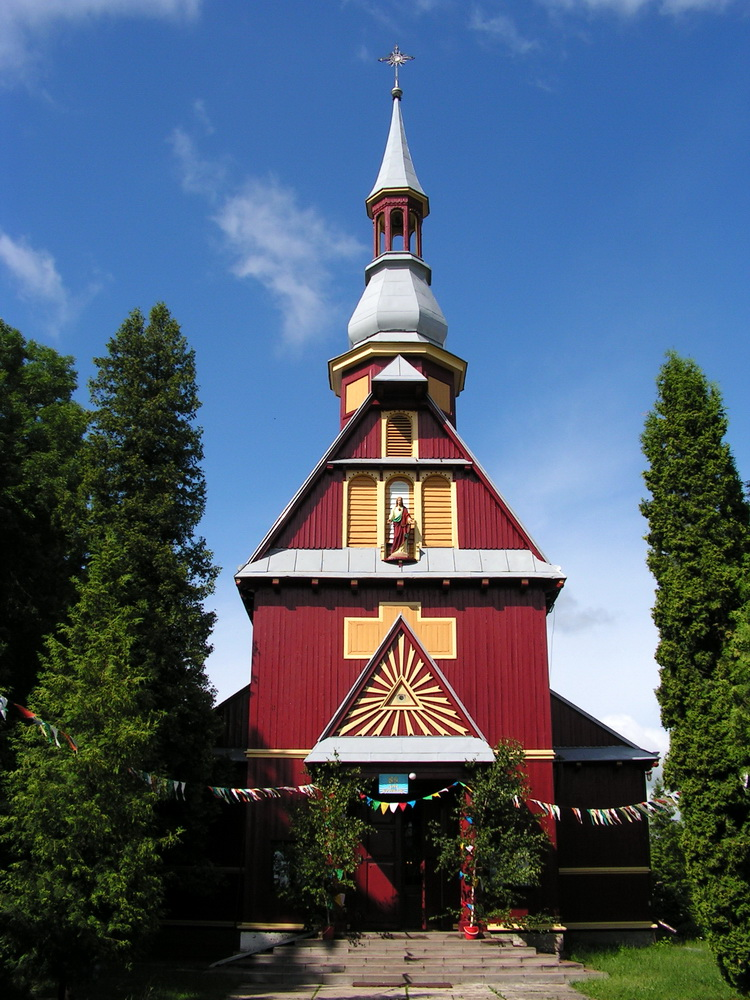
Church of the Exaltation of the Holy Cross

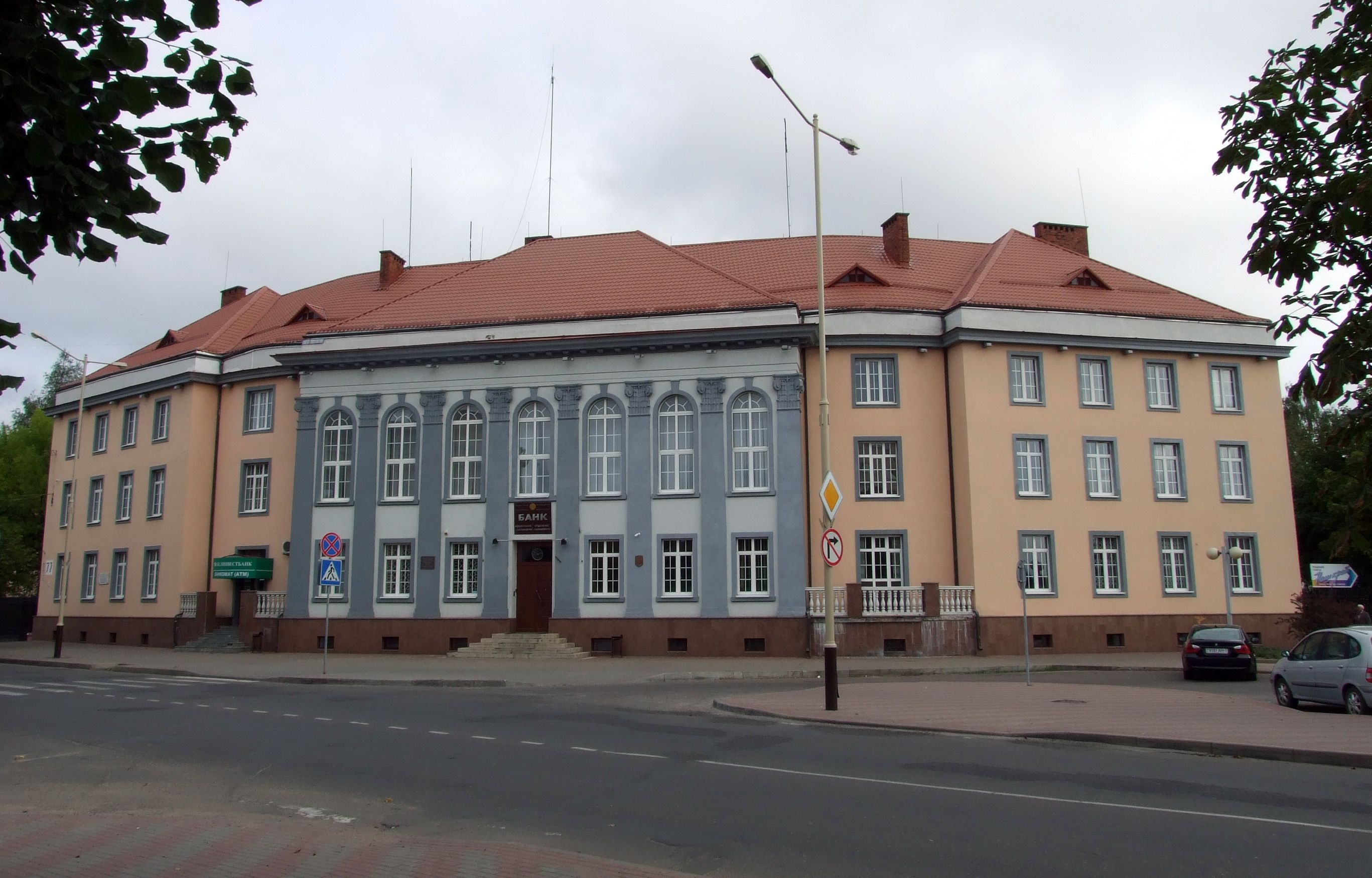
Former Bank of Poland building

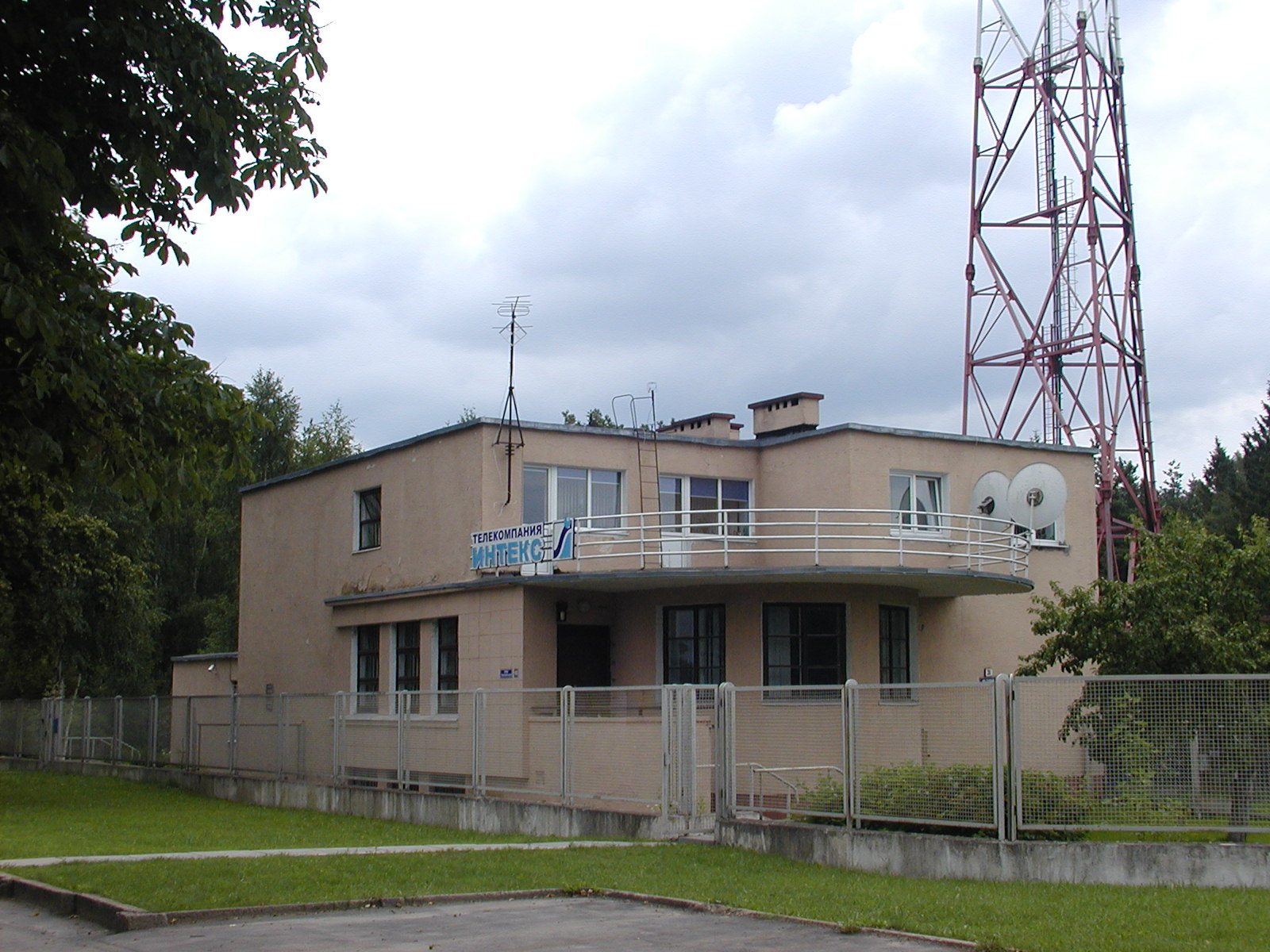
Polish Radio Baranowicze station

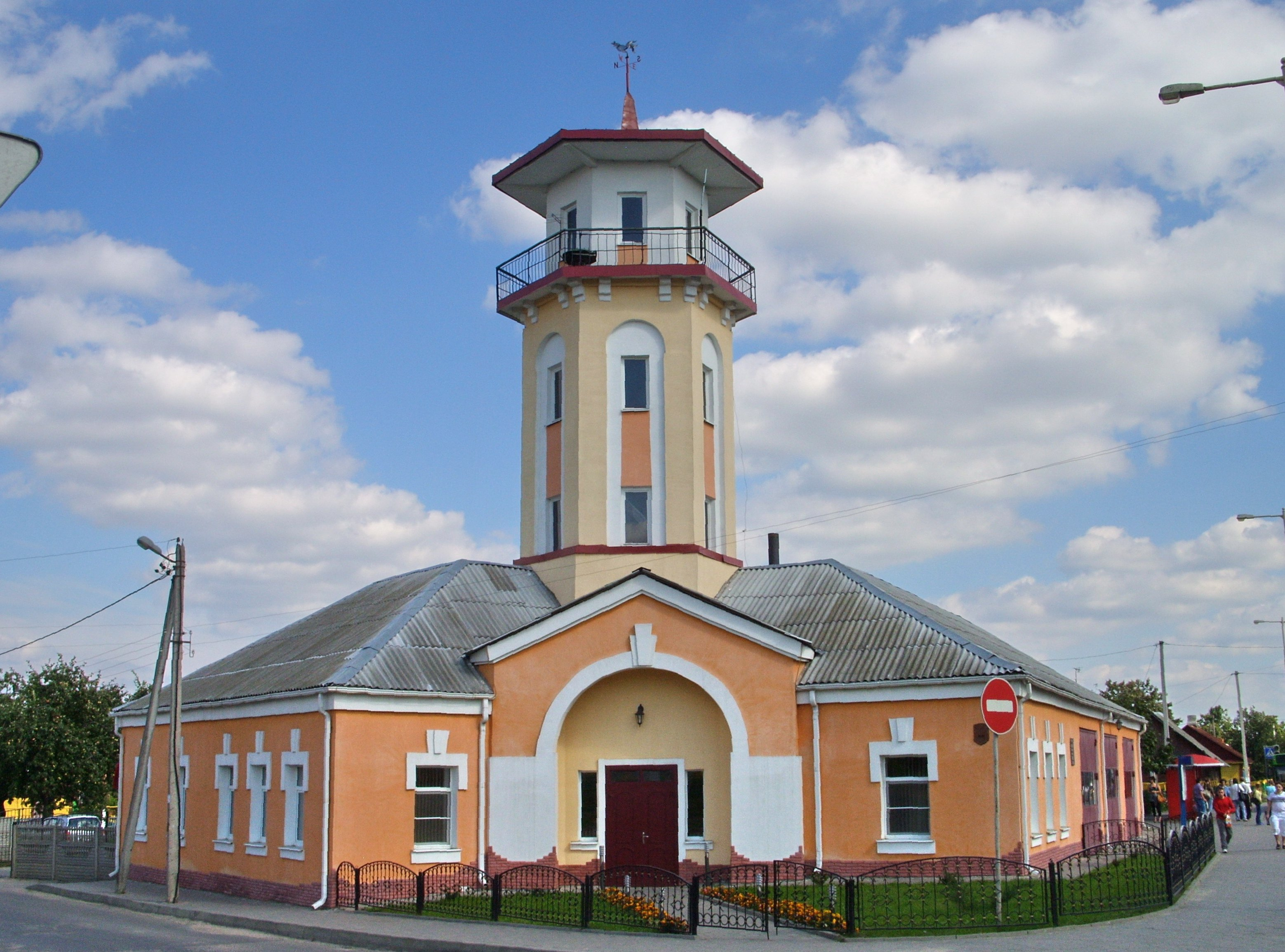
Pre-war fire station

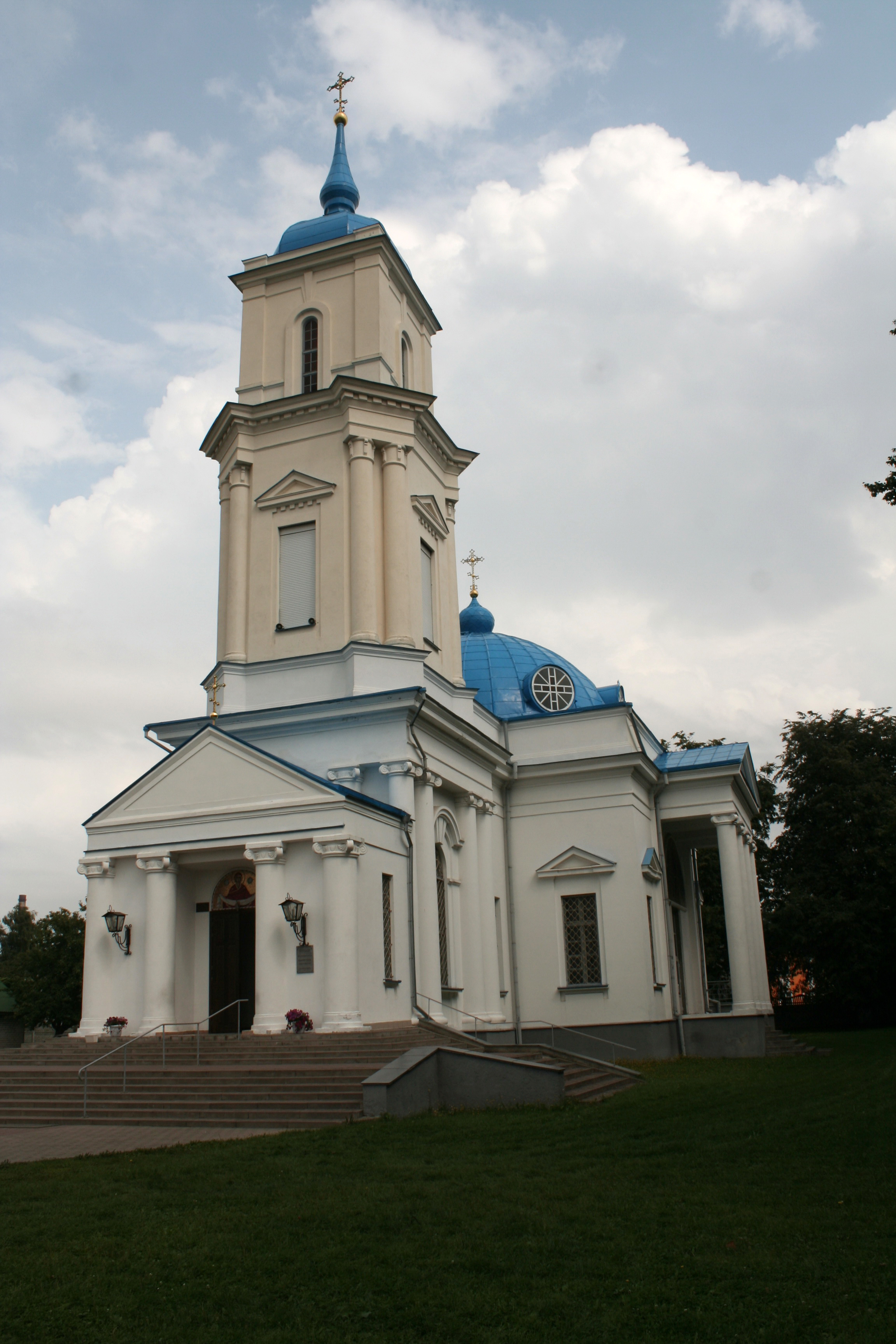
Church of the Protection of the Holy Virgin

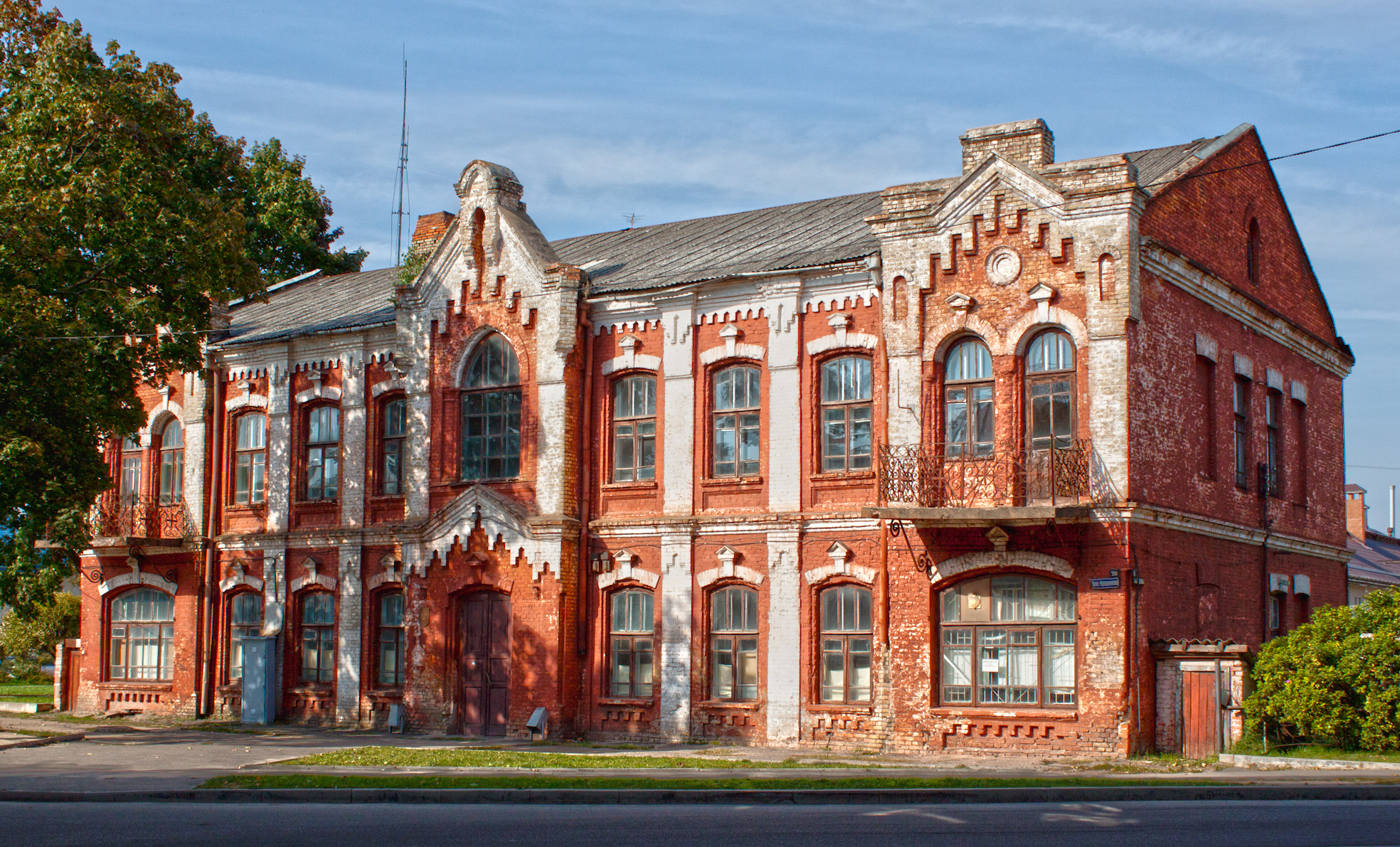
One of the preserved old townhouses

== Twin towns – sister cities ==
Baranavichy is twinned with:

- Biała Podlaska, Poland
- Chibi, China
- Kaliningrad, Russia
- Karlovo, Bulgaria
- Kineshma, Russia
- Konyaaltı, Turkey
- Magadan, Russia
- Mytishchi, Russia
- Nacka, Sweden
- Poltava, Ukraine
- Solntsevo (Moscow), Russia
- Stockerau, Austria
- Sulęcin County, Poland
- Vasileostrovsky (Saint Petersburg), Russia
- Yeysky District, Russia

In 2022 Jelgava, Latvia (2006) suspended the cooperation agreements with Baranavichy due to the Russian invasion of Ukraine.

== Notable people ==
- Mirosław Araszewski, Polish photographer and cinematographer
- Maja Berezowska, Polish painter
- Abraham Foxman, former CEO of Anti-Defamation League
- Alina Kabata-Pendias (1929–2019), scientist
- Lidia Korsakówna, Polish theatre and film actress
- Ihar Losik (1992), Belarusian blogger and activist recognised by Amnesty International as a political prisoner
- Kazimierz Świątek, Roman Catholic Cardinal and archbishop
- Elchonon Wasserman, rabbi and Rosh Yeshiva
- Valeriya Novodvorskaya, Soviet dissident, writer and liberal politician
- Santos Casani, ballroom dancer

== Significant depictions in popular culture ==
- Baranavichy is one of the starting towns of Lithuania in the turn-based strategy game Medieval II: Total War: Kingdoms.

== See also ==
- FC Baranovichi
- Polish Radio Baranowicze
