= Znachor =

Znachor may refer to:

- Znachor (novel), a novel by Tadeusz Dołęga-Mostowicz
- Znachor (1937 film), Polish film directed by Michał Waszyński, based on the novel
- Znachor (1982 film), 1982 Polish film directed by Jerzy Hoffman, based on the novel
- Forgotten Love (Polish title: Znachor), 2023 Polish film directed by Michal Gazda based on the novel
