= Kariera Nikodema Dyzmy (TV series) =

- Genre: Comedy
- Based on: The Career of Nicodemus Dyzma by Tadeusz Dołęga-Mostowicz
- Written by: Jan Rybkowski; Marek Nowicki; Witold Orzechowski
- Directed by: Jan Rybkowski; Marek Nowicki
- Starring: Roman Wilhelmi; Grażyna Barszczewska; Bronisław Pawlik
- Composer: Piotr Marczewski
- Country of origin: Poland
- Original language: Polish
- No. of seasons: 1
- No. of episodes: 7

Production
- Cinematography: Marek Nowicki
- Editor: Wieslawa Otocka
- Running time: 44–62 minutes
- Production company: Silesia

Original release
- Network: Telewizja Polska
- Release: 6 April – 18 May 1980

Kariera Nikodema Dyzmy is a Polish comedy television miniseries that aired on TVP1 from 6 April to 18 May 1980. It was based on the 1932 novel of the same title by Polish author Tadeusz Dołęga-Mostowicz.
