= Forgotten Love (film) =

- Directed by: Michal Gazda
- Written by: Marcin Baczyński; Mariusz Kuczewski
- Produced by: Magdalena Szwedkowicz
- Starring: Leszek Lichota; Maria Kowalska
- Cinematography: Tomasz Augustynek
- Music by: Paweł Lucewicz
- Distributed by: Netflix
- Release date: 27 September 2023
- Running time: 140 minutes
- Country: Poland
- Language: Polish

Forgotten Love (Polish: Znachor, translated as 'healer', 'quack') is a 2023 Polish drama film directed by Michał Gazda. It is an adaptation of the novel Znachor by Tadeusz Dołęga-Mostowicz with Leszek Lichota in the main character role. This is the third film adaptation of Dołęga-Mostowicz's novel; the previous ones were created in 1937 and 1981.

The film was produced by Netflix. It premiered September 27, 2023, and became one of the most-watched movies of the week as well as the fourth most-watched movie worldwide. On September 20-25, 2023, the movie had its pre-premiere screenings in Toruń, Krasnystaw, Wałbrzych, Kalisz, Lidzbark Warmiński and Stargard in Poland.

== Synopsis ==
Forgotten Love is a story taking place during the period between WWI and WWII about famous surgeon Rafal Wilczur. Professor Wilczur is at the peak of his medical career when his wife (Beata) leaves him, taking with her his daughter Marysia. Abandoned by his wife, he falls victim to a mugging and as a result of head injuries loses his memory. Following the mugging he is presumed dead but resurfaces 15 years later in the countryside suffering with amnesia. However, Professor Wilczur continues to have some intermittent memories of his daughter and is able to practice medicine in the countryside. When he crosses paths with his daughter once again, he is reminded of his love for her.

== Cast ==
- Leszek Lichota as prof. Rafał Wilczur aka Antoni Kosiba
- Maria Kowalska as Marysia, daughter of prof. Wilczur
- Ignacy Liss as Leszek, son of Count Czyński
- Anna Szymańczyk as Zośka
- Izabela Kuna as Countess Czyńska
- Mikołaj Grabowski as Count Stanisław Czyński
- Mirosław Haniszewski as Jerzy Dobraniecki
- Artur Barciś as the butler Józef
- Małgorzata Mikołajczak as Beata Wilczur, the professor's wife
- Paweł Tomaszewski as Baron Krzeszowski
- Jarosław Gruda as Lesien
- Henryk Niebudek as Bogdan Szulc
- Adam Nawojczyk as Doctor Pawlicki

== Production ==
Pawel Lucewicz composed the original music.

Masovian songs were sung in the soundtrack by the Svahy band.

== Reception ==
On September 27th, 2023, Netflix added Forgotten Love to its catalog, and it became one of the most-watched movies of the week. After the Top 10 was refreshed, Flix Patrol revealed that the title became part of the most-watched movies of the week, occupying the Top 4 just a day after its release and becoming the fourth most-watched movie worldwide. In the course of five weeks since its premiere, it entered the Top 10 of most popular non-English language films in as many as 59 countries worldwide.

According to reviews, Forgotten Love boasts a strong screenplay, reminiscent of Victor Hugo's great novels of the 19th century. The film has a well-developed subplot, good set design, photography, immersive music, and a well-paced story. It is a story with a strong sense of justice that holds a profound belief in the goodness of humanity. At times, it may seem old-fashioned, and a bit naive, but Forgotten Love manages to create a movie about the goodness of humanity, even in difficult circumstances. Bartosz Staszczyszyn of Culture.pl points to the film's director ability "to create entertaining cinema that willingly uses genre clichés, does not take offence at mass audiences and at the same time is produced to the highest standards of filmmaking craftsmanship."
