= Nikodem Dyzma (film) =

- Directed by: Jan Rybkowski
- Written by: Ludwik Starski
- Based on: Kariera Nikodema Dyzmy by Tadeusz Dołęga-Mostowicz
- Starring: Adolf Dymsza
- Cinematography: Władysław Forbert
- Edited by: Czesław Raniszewski
- Music by: Jerzy Harald
- Release date: 29 October 1956 (Poland)
- Running time: 107 minutes
- Country: Poland
- Language: Polish

Nikodem Dyzma is a 1956 Polish political comedy film directed by Jan Rybkowski. It is based on the 1932 political novel Kariera Nikodema Dyzmy by Tadeusz Dołęga-Mostowicz.

Nikodem Dyzma, a street wretch without a job or a roof over his head (owning just his tailcoat), tries to get a job in one of the nightclubs, the owner of which declares that he is not suitable for this job because he is too provincial. As luck would have it, he finds an invitation to a certain elegant ball on the street, to which he decides to return the invitation, counting on a modest tip. Meanwhile, he is mistaken for one of the guests, and thanks to his rather peculiar behavior, he soon becomes the president of a public sector bank.

== Cast ==
- Adolf Dymsza as Nikodem Dyzma
- Urszula Modrzyńska as Zula
- Kazimierz Fabisiak as Leon Kunicki
- Ewa Krasnodębska as Nina Kunicka
- Lech Madaliński as colonel Wareda
- Andrzej Bogucki as Władysław Jaszuński
- Edward Dziewoński as Jan Ulanicki
- Halina Dobrowolska as Kasia Kunicka
- Tadeusz Fijewski
- Leon Niemczyk
- Emil Karewicz
- Lidia Wysocka as revue singer
- Jarema Stępowski
- Zygmunt Chmielewski
- Stanisław Milski
- Lidia Korsakówna
- Teresa Lipowska
- Gustaw Lutkiewicz
