= Elektryczne Gitary =

Polish rock band formed in 1989

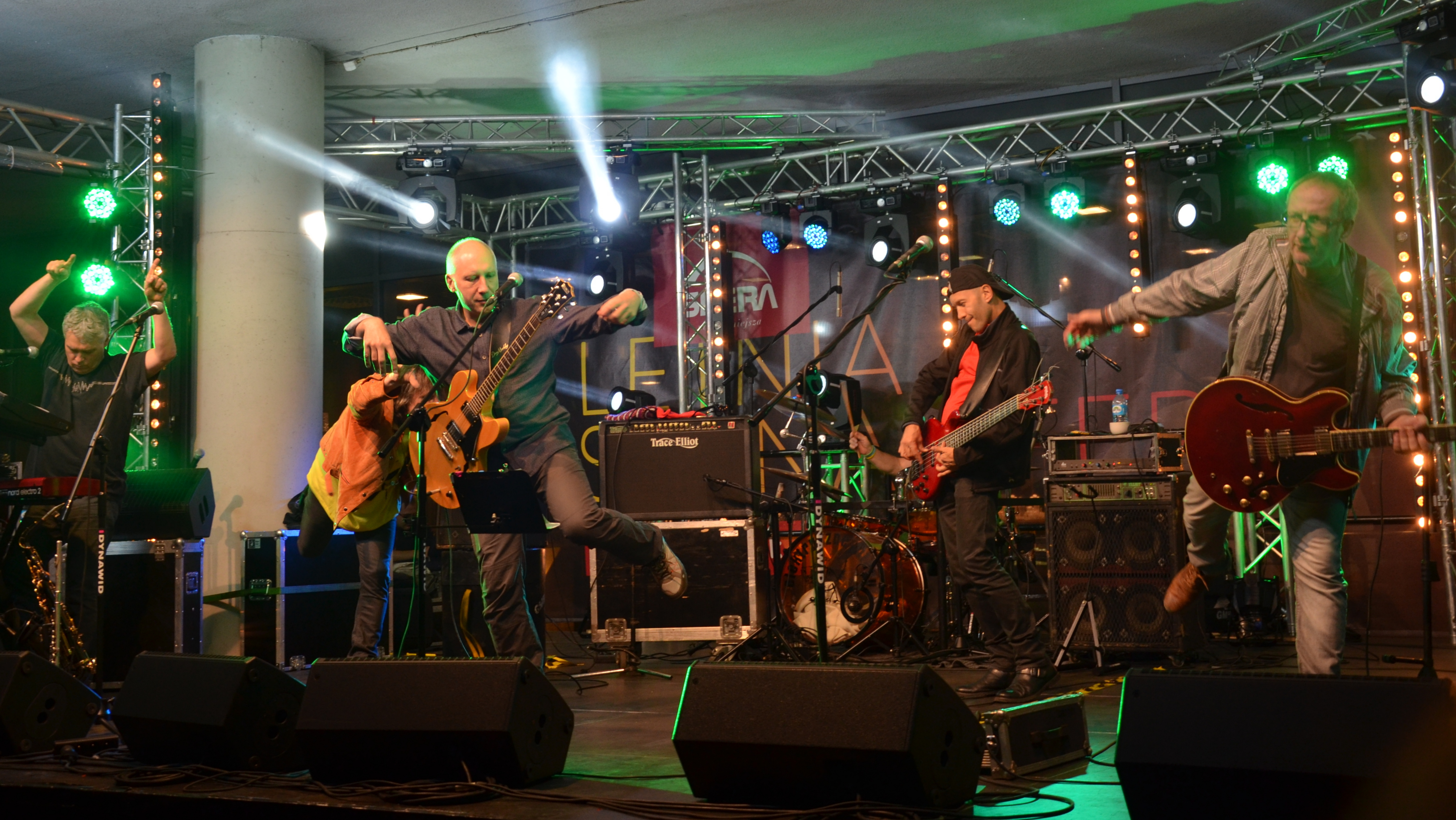
- Elektryczne Gitary during a concert on 4 September 2015

Background information
- Origin: Warsaw, Poland
- Genres: rock and roll, pop rock, comedy rock, alternative rock
- Years active: 1989–present
- Labels: Zic Zac, PolyGram Polska, Universal Music Polska, Warner Music Poland, Polskie Radio, S.P. Records
- Members: Kuba Sienkiewicz, Tomasz Grochowalski, Aleksander Korecki, Piotr Łojek, Leon Paduch, Jacek Wąsowski
- Past members: Rafał Kwaśniewski, Marek Kanclerz, Robert Wrona, Jarosław Kopeć
- Website: www.elektrycznegitary.pl

Elektryczne Gitary is a Polish rock band formed in 1989 by Rafał Kwaśniewski, Piotr Łojek, and Kuba Sienkiewicz. Their primary goal is to perform original songs with a rock sound, with most of the band's repertoire written by Sienkiewicz. The band's logo, featuring an "electric cat", was designed by artist Jarosław Koziara.

The band gained popularity quickly and by 2009 had sold over 1.5 million original albums. Known for their distinctive sense of humor and self-deprecating irony, the band developed a reputation for not taking the rock genre too seriously. Sienkiewicz has stated that during their performances, he aims to exaggerate and caricature their music. Guitar phrases are intentionally played to sound self-mocking, and many of their concerts resemble happenings rather than traditional rock shows.

== History ==
=== Beginnings and the 1990s ===
In 1977, Kuba Sienkiewicz and Piotr Łojek founded the acoustic band Młode Matki, and later, they formed Zuch Kozioł with Mirosław Jędras. After the dissolution of both projects, they didn't collaborate for some time. During this period, Łojek and Rafał Kwaśniewski arranged big-beat versions of songs written by Sienkiewicz, and soon, with drummer Sławomir Wiechecki, they began rehearsing and recording together.

Their first concert took place at the Róbrege Festival. On 10 May 1990, they performed at the Hybrydy Club in Warsaw with new drummer Marek Kanclerz. From the beginning, they played songs by Kuba Sienkiewicz but also drew from the works of artists such as Stanisław Staszewski, Jacek Kleyff, Rafał Wojaczek, and Jan Krzysztof Kelus. Part of their repertoire was also composed by Piotr Łojek.

In 1991, they signed a contract with the Zic Zac label and released their debut studio album Wielka radość in 1992. The album included hits like Jestem z miasta, Włosy, Przewróciło się, and Koniec. Two tracks, Będę szedł and Wszystko ch., featured saxophone by Aleksander Korecki, who officially joined the band in 1995. Just before recording the debut album, Marek Kanclerz left the band; he can only be heard on the song Włosy, recorded during a 1990 rehearsal session. From then on, Robert Wrona served as the band's concert drummer until 2003. During the album's recording, bassist Tomasz Grochowalski joined the group.

By mid-1991, their popularity in Poland grew significantly, thanks to airplay on local radio stations, followed by broadcasts on Polskie Radio Program III, and eventually, other nationwide stations. They began to tour larger venues, and crowds of several thousand people attended their performances. They solidified their place on the Polish music scene by performing alongside Dżem and Kobranocka at Riviera Club in Warsaw.

In 1994, Robert Wrona left the band and was replaced by Jarosław Kopeć. At times, second drummer Robert Szambelan performed with the group. The band rearranged several songs, which appeared in more elaborate versions during concerts, such as Włosy and Koniec. At the beginning of 1995, they released a blues-inspired album, Huśtawki, featuring Marymoncki Dżon with lyrics by Krzysztof Bień, and a Polish adaptation of Paul McCartney's Heart of the Country, titled Serce jak pies. Although the album initially sold only 80,000 copies – less than their first two – it still achieved gold record status by 1997.

In mid-1995, Aleksander Korecki joined the band. In 1996, the band signed with PolyGram Polska and released a live album, Chałtury, featuring recordings from two Warsaw concerts (2 September 1995 at Krasiński Square and 7 January 1996 at the Riviera Club). Alongside Elektryczne Gitary and Kuba Sienkiewicz's hits, the album included covers like Jestem o(d)padem atomowym by Zacier and Celina by Stanisław Staszewski. The album, featuring Korecki on saxophone, was promoted with a video for Jestem o(d)padem atomowym and a tour.

In 1997, they released Na krzywy ryj, featuring the hit Co ty tutaj robisz. After the album's release, Jarosław Kopeć left, replaced by Leon Paduch. This lineup has remained unchanged. The album revitalized the band's popularity, earning a platinum certification and sparking a well-received tour. That year, they also created the soundtrack for Juliusz Machulski's film Kiler, featuring hits like Kiler, written in five minutes. The soundtrack became the best-selling in Polish film history.

The collaboration with Machulski continued in 1999 with the soundtrack for Kiler-ów 2-óch, highlighted by Co powie Ryba. During this time, the band performed open-air concerts and joined tours organized by commercial radio stations.

In 2000, Elektryczne Gitary celebrated their 10th anniversary with the two-disc album Słodka maska. The first disc contained studio recordings, including two lesser-known songs by Kazimierz Grześkowiak, while the second featured concert recordings from Poznań (27 May 2000) and Szczecin (10 June 2000). The album was promoted with Nowa gwiazda, which mocked the absurdity of Polish elections. The state broadcaster, TVP, declined to air the video, negatively impacting the album's promotion.

=== 21st century ===
In 2002, Elektryczne Gitary recorded the soundtrack for Jacek Bromski's comedy Career of Nikos Dyzma, promoting it with the song Doktor Dyzma. The band rearranged their earlier songs for the soundtrack while also creating new material. In 2003, they worked on new original compositions and performed numerous concerts across Poland. Despite having extensive demo recordings, the label Universal hesitated to release a new album, leading to the band terminating their contract. During this time, they recorded the song Jogurtowy twist for a Bakoma yogurt advertisement.

In 2006, they signed with Warner Music Poland and released the album Atomistyka on September 25, featuring the single Czasy średnie. The album's promotional efforts included a live concert at Warsaw's Podzamcze and a video featuring interviews and footage of the performance. By 2008, Jacek Wąsowski joined as a guitarist, first as a temporary replacement and then as a permanent member.

Following the extensive spring-summer tour, the band organized four unique concerts in November and December 2008 at various radio stations: Polskie Radio RDC, Polskie Radio Białystok, Radio Łódź, and Polskie Radio Program I. These performances included several newly created songs, which were recorded and released on the live album Antena on 5 June 2009. This release commemorated the band's 20-year history. On 2 November 2010, Elektryczne Gitary issued the album Historia, offering their distinctive musical take on various events from Polish history.

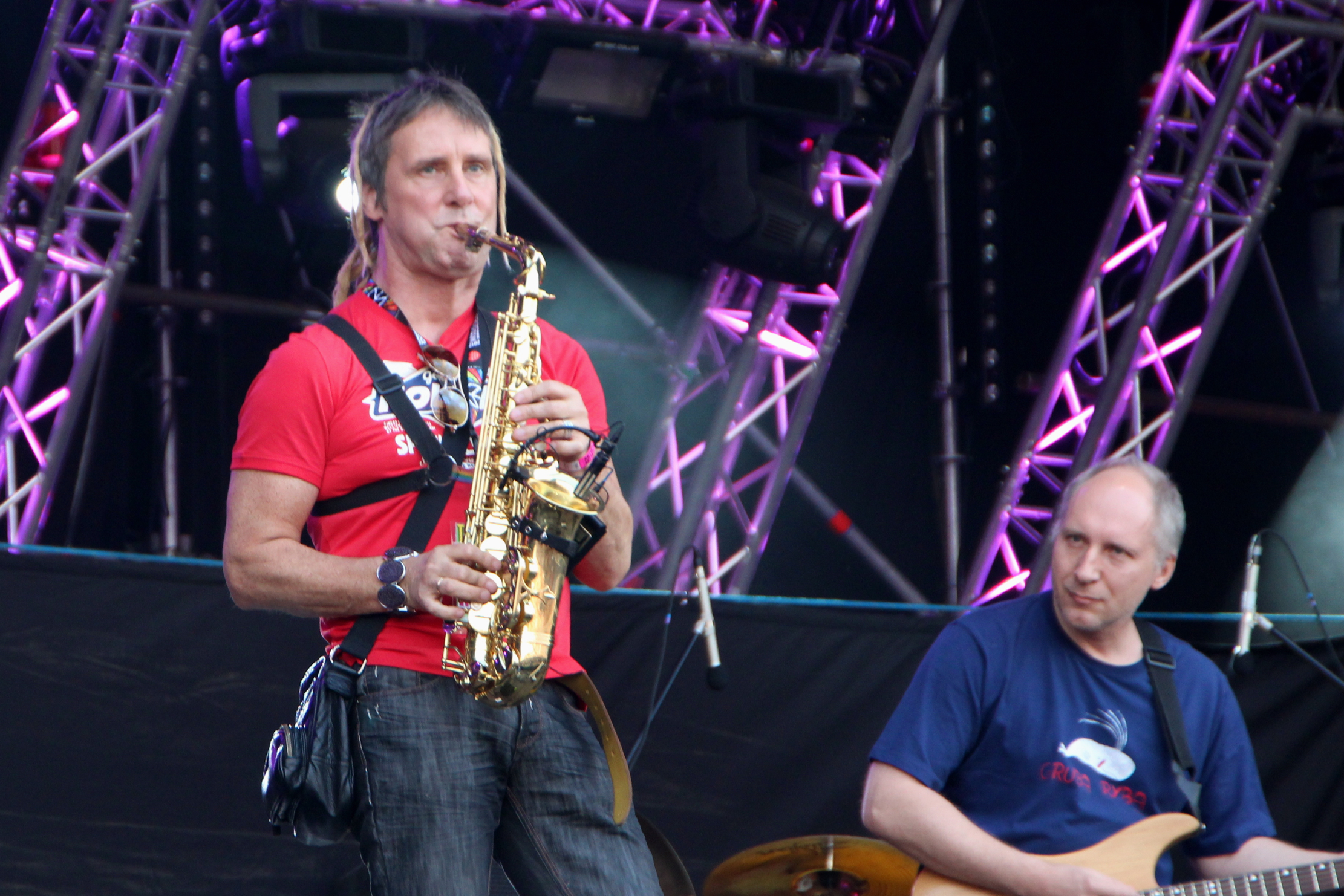
Elektryczne Gitary in 2012

In 2012, the album Nic mnie nie rusza was released, with the title track accompanied by a music video. That summer, the band performed at Przystanek Woodstock, releasing a DVD of the performance in December. In June 2014, they celebrated their 25th anniversary with Stare Jak Nowe. 25 przebojów na 25-lecie, featuring refreshed versions of their hits.

== Discography ==
=== Studio albums ===
Year	Album	Release date	Publisher	Chart position (OLiS)	Certification
1992	Wielka radość	Mid-1992	Zic Zac	–	2× platinum
1993	A ty co	2 November 1993	Zic Zac	–	Platinum
1995	Huśtawki	January 1995	Zic Zac	–	Gold
1997	Na krzywy ryj	23 March 1997	PolyGram Polska	–	Platinum
2000	Słodka maska	28 September 2000	Universal Music Polska	30	–
2006	Atomistyka	25 September 2006	Warner Music Poland	24	–
2010	Historia	2 November 2010	EMI Music Poland	49	–
2012	Nic mnie nie rusza	20 March 2012	EMI Music Poland	37	–
2016	Czasowniki	13 June 2016	MTJ	–	–
2020	2020	30 April 2020	S.P. Records	–	–

"–" indicates that the album was not charted.

=== Compilations ===
Year	Album	Release date	Publisher	Chart position (OLiS)	Certification
1997	Nie jestem z miasta – the best of	1997	Zic Zac / BMG Poland	–	–
1998	Sława – de best 2	1998	Zic Zac / BMG Poland	–	–
2000	Gold	17 July 2000	Koch International Poland	–	–
2001	Niepokonani	28 September 2001	Universal Music Polska	–	–
2007	Gwiazdy XX Wieku. Elektryczne Gitary – Największe przeboje	2007	Sony BMG	–	–
2014	Stare jak nowe. 25 przebojów na 25-lecie	3 June 2014	Warner Music Poland	28	Gold

=== Live albums ===
Year	Album	Release date	Publisher
1996	Chałtury	21 April 1996	PolyGram Polska
2009	Antena	5 June 2009	Agencja Muzyczna Polskiego Radia

=== Soundtracks ===
Year	Album	Release date	Publisher	Certification
1997	Kiler	10 February 1997	PolyGram Polska	Platinum
1999	Kiler-ów 2-óch	11 January 1999	PolyGram Polska	–
2002	Kariera Nikosia Dyzmy	28 February 2002	Universal Music Polska	–

=== DVDs ===
Year	Album	Release date	Publisher
2012	Elektryczne Gitary – XVIII Przystanek Woodstock, 4 sierpnia 2012	30 November 2012	Złoty Melon

=== Singles ===
Year	Title	Chart position (LP3)	Album
1991	Jestem z miasta	18	Wielka radość
1991	Włosy	20	Wielka radość
1992	Koniec	–	Wielka radość
1993	Dzieci	3	A ty co
1993	Dylematy	–	A ty co
1994	Serce jak pies	8	Huśtawki
1994	Marymoncki Dżon	–	Huśtawki
1996	Jestem o(d)padem atomowym	–	Chałtury
1996	Idę do pracy	–	Chałtury
1996	Jestem z miasta	–	Chałtury
1997	Co ty tutaj robisz	1	Na krzywy ryj
1997	Na krzywy ryj	11	Na krzywy ryj
1997	Ja jestem nowy rok	31	Na krzywy ryj
1997	Goń swego pawia	–	Na krzywy ryj
1997	Kiler	1	Kiler
1998	Co powie Ryba	9	Kiler-ów 2-óch
1999	Nie jestem sobą	38	Kiler-ów 2-óch
1999	Ja mam szczęście	–	Kiler-ów 2-óch
1999	Zostań tu (cover of Only You by The Platters)	–	–
2000	Nowa gwiazda	–	Słodka maska
2000	Napady	24	Słodka maska
2001	Słodka laska – biała śmierć	–	Słodka maska
2002	Doktor Dyzma	–	Kariera Nikosia Dyzmy
2005	O słoneczku	–	–
2006	Nie urosnę	–	Atomistyka
2006	Czasy średnie	6	Atomistyka
2006	Kiedy mówisz człowiek	–	Atomistyka
2009	Dwudziestolatka	–	Historia
2009	Ucieczka 5:55	–	Historia
2010	Był NZS	–	Historia
2010	Dywizjon 303	13	Historia
2019	Najwyższa pora	29	2020
2020	Ósmy trzeci	–	2020
2020	Podróżnicze sny	–	2020

== Members ==
=== Current members ===
- Kuba Sienkiewicz (1990–present): Guitar, vocals
- Piotr Łojek (1990–present): Keyboards, guitars
- Tomasz Grochowalski (1992–present): Bass guitar
- Aleksander Korecki (1995–present): Saxophone, flute, percussion
- Leon Paduch (1997–present): Drums
- Jacek Wąsowski (2008–present): Lead guitar

=== Former members ===
- Rafał Kwaśniewski (1990–1992): Lead guitar
- Marek Kanclerz (1990–1991): Drums
- Robert Wrona (1991–1994): Drums
- Jarosław Kopeć (1994–1997): Drums

== Bibliography ==
- Sienkiewicz, Jakub (2015). Kubatura, czyli elektryczne wagary [Kubatura, or Electric Skipping School] (in Polish). Czerwone i Czarne. ISBN 978-83-7700-176-9.
