= 2026 Series Mania =

2026 television festival

- Opening film: The Testaments by Bruce Miller
- Closing film: The Glass House by Martin Matte
- Location: Lille, France
- Founded: 2010
- Festival date: 19–27 March 2026
- Website: seriesmania.com/en

Series Mania
- 2025

The 2026 Series Mania is a television festival that took place from 19 to 27 March 2026 in Lille, France. The festival opened with the American dystopian drama series The Testaments and closed with the Canadian comedy-drama series The Glass House.

The most prestigious award of the festival, Grand Prix was presented to Polish drama series Proud, created by Karol Klementowicz.

== Jury ==
The following juries were named for the festival:

=== International Competition ===
- Benedikt Erlingsson, Icelandic actor and director, Jury President
- Alice Braga, Brazilian actress and producer
- Cécile de France, Belgian actress
- Hatik, French rapper and actor
- Ida Panahandeh, Iranian director
- Luke Watson, British director

=== International Panorama ===
- Pénélope Bagieu, French author and illustrator, Jury President
- Enrico Maria Artale, Italian filmmaker
- Synnøve Hørsdal, Norwegian producer
- Thomas Ngijol, French actor
- Kamila Zlatušková, Czech producer and founder of Serial Killer

=== French Competition ===
- Irene Crespo, Spanish journalist
- Barry Levitt, British journalist
- Justyna Mis, Polish journalist
- Miina Väisänen, Finnish journalist
- Arabella Wintermayr, German journalist

=== Short Forms ===
- Ceylan Yildirim, Turkish-German showrunner, Jury President
- Mounia Akl, Lebanese director
- Younès Boucif, French actor
- Simon Lööf, Swedish actor

== Official selection ==
=== Opening and closing series ===
Title	Original title	Creator(s)	Production countrie(s)	Network
The Testaments (opening series)		Bruce Miller	United States	Hulu
The Glass House (closing series)	Vitrerie joyal	Martin Matte	Canada	Prime Video

=== International Competition ===
Title	Original title	Creator(s)	Production countrie(s)	Network
The Anatomy of a Moment	Anatomía de un instante	Alberto Rodríguez	Spain	Movistar Plus+
The Audacity		Jonathan Glatzer	United States	AMC
Dear Killer Nannies		Sebastián Ortega, Sebastián Marroquín, and Pablo Farina	Colombia	Disney+, Hulu
Dustfall		Dianne Taylor, Stuart Page, Belinda Chayko, Beatrix Christian	Australia	ABC TV
Major Players		Molly Manning Walker	United Kingdom	Channel 4
My Brother	Jag for ner till bror	Sanna Lenken, Karin Arrhenius	Sweden	SVT
Paolo		Sébastien Marnier	France	HBO Max
Proud		Karol Klementowicz	Poland	HBO Max
Waiting for the Out		Dennis Kelly	United Kingdom	BBC

=== International Panorama ===
Title	Original title	Creator(s)	Production countrie(s)	Network
Babies		Stefan Golaszewski	United Kingdom	BBC One
The Best Immigrant		Raoul Groothuizen, Christina Poppe	Belgium	Streamz
Breendonk		Kevin Janssens, Filip Lenaerts	Belgium	VRT
Burden of Justice	Hundarna	Jens Lapidus	Sweden	SVT
Ethernal	Ethernel	Romain Renard, Olivier Tollet	Belgium	RTBF
The Flaws	Das Manko	Bastian Reiber, Arne Feldhusen	Germany	ZDF
Prisoner 951		Stephen Butchard, Philippa Lowthorpe	United Kingdom	BBC One
Queen of Mars	火星の女王	Satoshi Ogawa	Japan	NHK
Small Prophets		Mackenzie Crook	United Kingdom	BBC
These Sacred Vows		John Butler	Ireland	RTÉ One
Variola Vera	Czarna Smierc	Wojciech Lepianka, Piotr Derewenda, Kuba Czekaj	Poland	TVP
Welcome to Kingston-Falls		Robin Aubert	Canada	CBC

=== French Competition ===
Title	Original title	Creator(s)	Production countrie(s)	Network
All Shapes of Us	Grandiose	Fanny Riedberger	France	TF1
Camarades		Benjamin Charbit, Dominique Baumard	France	Arte
Eldorado		Tarek Haoudy, Nacim Mehtar	France	Arte
Privileges		Marie Monge, Vladimir de Fontenay	France	HBO Max
Summer of '36		Marie Deshaires, Catherine Touzet, Fred Garson	France	TF1
Unchained		Alain Moreau	France	France Télévisions

=== Short Forms ===
Title	Original title	Creator(s)	Production countrie(s)	Network
Atlantis Pasila		Anna Brotkin	Finland	Yle
Ayer's Cliff		Edouard Gingras, Zacharie Lareau	Canada	Ici TOU.TV
Happiness		Pouria Takavar, Yashar Alishenas	France	Arte.tv
Hirayasumi	ひらやすみ	Keigo Shinzo	Japan	NHK
Homebodies		AP Pobjoy	Australia	SBS
The Last Hour	La dernière heure	Joseph Safieddine	France	Arte
Saturniids	Les Saturnides	Neegan Siouï Trudel	Canada	TV5 Québec Canada
Unfiltered	Sense filtres	Amaya Izquierdo	Spain	3Cat

=== Special Screenings ===
Title	Original title	Creator(s)	Production countrie(s)	Network
Asphodèle		—N/a	France	—N/a
Etty		Hagai Levi	France, Germany, Netherlands	Arte
Flunked		François Uzan	France	Netflix
The Legend of Kitchen Soldier	취사병 전설이 되다	Choi Ryong, Jo Nam-hyung	South Korea	TVING
Lucky Luke		Mathieu Leblanc, Thomas Mansuy, Justine Kim Gautier, Julie-Anne Grignon, Benjamin Rocher	France	France.tv, Disney+
Peaky Blinders: The Immortal Man		Steven Knight	United Kingdom	Netflix

== Awards ==
The following awards were presented at the festival:

=== International Competition ===
- Grand Prix: Proud by Karol Klementowicz (HBO Max)
- Best Writing: Dennis Kelly for Waiting for the Out (BBC)
- Best Actress: Amanda Jansson for My Brother (SVT)
- Best Actor: Ignacy Liss for Proud (HBO Max)

=== French Competition ===
- Best Series: All Shapes of Us by Fanny Riedberger (TF1)
- Best Actress: Manon Kneusé for Camarades (Arte)
- Best Actor: Karim Leklou for Eldorado (Arte)
- Best Musical Score: Amine Bouhafa for Privileges (HBO Max)

=== International Competition ===
- Best Series: Small Prophets by Mackenzie Crook (BBC)
- Best Directing: Arne Feldhusen for The Flaws (ZDF)
- Best Actress: Lauren Patel for Small Prophets (BBC)
- Best Actor: Maxime Le Flaguais for Welcome to Kingston-Falls (CBC)
- Students Award: Variola Vera by Wojciech Lepianka, Piotr Derewenda, and Kuba Czekaj (TVP)

=== Short Forms Competition ===
- Best Series: Ayer's Cliff by Edouard Gingras and Zacharie Lareau (Ici TOU.TV)
  - Special Mention: Hirayasumi by Keigo Shinzo (NHK)
- High School Students of the Hauts-de-France Region Award: The Last Hour by Joseph Safieddine (Arte)
  - Special Mention: Homebodies by AP Pobjoy (SBS)

=== Audience Award ===
- Audience Award: Dustfall by Dianne Taylor, Stuart Page, Belinda Chayko, and Beatrix Christian (ABC TV)
