= Career of Nikos Dyzma =

2002 Polish film

- Directed by: Jacek Bromski
- Written by: Jacek Bromski; Tomasz Kępski
- Produced by: Henryk Parnowski; Michał Balcerzak; Włodzimierz Otulak
- Starring: Cezary Pazura; Anna Przybylska; Ewa Kasprzyk; Andrzej Grabowski
- Cinematography: Arkadiusz Tomiak
- Edited by: Krzysztof Szpetmański
- Music by: Henri Seroka; Elektryczne Gitary; Kuba Sienkiewicz
- Distributed by: Vision Film Distribution
- Release date: 15 March 2002
- Running time: 103 minutes
- Country: Poland
- Language: Polish

Career of Nikos Dyzma (also known as Kariera Nikosia Dyzmy in Polish) is a 2002 Polish film directed by Jacek Bromski. The film is a mordant contemporary satire loosely based on the 1932 novel The Career of Nicodemus Dyzma by Tadeusz Dołęga-Mostowicz, which narrates the story of a crude opportunist from the countryside, whose vulgarity, mistaken by the Polish elite in the capital for canny insight, facilitates his rise through the social and political ranks of the nation. The same novel also inspired the 1979 American film Being There.

== Cast ==
- Cezary Pazura as Nikodem, "Nikoś" Dyzma
- Anna Przybylska as Jadzia, the wife of the minister Jaszuński
- Ewa Kasprzyk as Senator Anna Walewska
- Andrzej Grabowski as Roman Kiliński
- Krzysztof Globisz as Minister Jaszuński
- Krzysztof Pieczynski as Kropiel
- Olgierd Łukaszewicz as Prime Minister
- Lew Rywin as Terkowski
- Katarzyna Figura as Nurse

== Awards ==
- Eagles

year: 2003 Type: appointment Award: Eagle Category: Best Costume Design (Margaret Braszka)

- Golden Ducks

year: 2003 Type: appointment Award: Golden Duck Category: Best Polish actress (Anna Przybylska)

- Golden Lions

year: 2002 Type: appointment Award: Golden Lions Category: Participation in the main competition (Jacek Bromski)

== Other information ==
Period Picture: October 10 - November 21, 2001.

Landscapes: Pabianice (Lutheran Cemetery), Lodz (Poznanski Palace Street. Ogrodowa, ul. Marathon, rector Film School - Film Walewska senator's office, the rector of the Academy of Medicine - a film cabinet minister Jaszuńskiego, home of "Polonia", Al. Mickiewicza - film study Kilińskiego, a hypermarket M1, Poniatowski Park, st. Wolczanska requested to fill at the hospital), Wola, near Lodz Błędowska (golf course), Leśmierz (refinery), Warsaw, Gdynia (port).

Gala premiere took place March 7, 2002 in Lodz, in the cinema "Baltic" and the March 14, 2002 in Warsaw at the cinema 'Cinematheque. "

In 2002, the film received an award of the Association "Polish Cinemas - Golden Ticket for a fourth place ranking in the audience.

The film can be confused with the Polish comedy of manners in 1956 under the title "Nicodemus Dyzma"

The film can be confused with the Polish soap opera from 1980, which is a soap opera costume and satire titled "The Career of Nicodemus Dyzma"

Sound: Janusz Bouillon and Michael Kosterkiewicz
