= Open Your Eyes (TV series) =

Polish supernatural television series

- Promotional poster
- Polish: Otwórz oczy
- Genre: Supernatural; Mystery; Drama
- Based on: Druga szansa by Katarzyna Berenika Miszczuk
- Screenplay by: Kasper Bajon; Igor Brejdygant; Milena Dutkowska; Klara Kochańska
- Directed by: Anna Jadowska; Adrian Panek
- Starring: Maria Wawreniuk; Ignacy Liss
- Country of origin: Poland
- Original language: Polish
- No. of seasons: 1
- No. of episodes: 6

Production
- Producers: Marcin Kurek; Cyprian Marchewka
- Running time: 54 minutes
- Production companies: Mediabrigade; Polish Film Institute

Original release
- Network: Netflix
- Release: 25 August 2021

Open Your Eyes (Polish: Otwórz oczy) is a Polish supernatural thriller television series created by Netflix, based on the 2013 novel Druga szansa by Katarzyna Berenika Miszczuk.

== Synopsis ==
Julia wakes up in an amnesia treatment centre after losing her family in a terrible accident. She begins to build relationships with other patients at the centre who have suffered similar traumas. One of these is Adam, who shows her around. Julia begins to have strange dreams and visions and gradually starts to question the place she finds herself confined in. She tries to escape from the institution in order to discover the truth.

== Cast and characters ==
- Maria Wawreniuk as Julia
  - Magdalena Budzowska as young Julia
- Ignacy Liss as Adam
- Michał Sikorski as Paweł
- Wojciech Dolatowski as Szymon
- Klaudia Koścista as Iza
- Zuzanna Galewicz as Milena
- Marta Nieradkiewicz as Dr. Zofia Morulska
- Sara Celler-Jezierska as Magda
- Marcin Czarnik as Piotr
- Martyna Nowakowska as Anielka
- Łukasz Nowicki as voice of black cube
