= Anna Przybylska =

Polish actress and model (1978–2014)

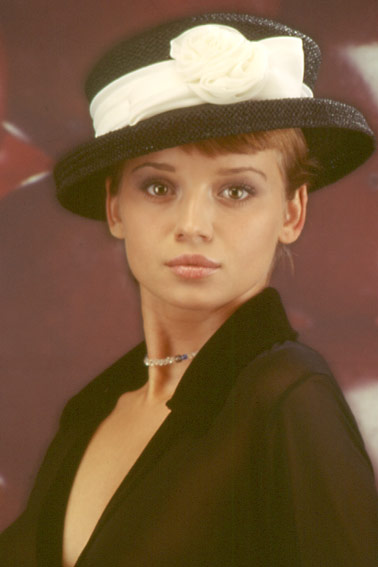
- Anna Przybylska, 2008
- Born: 26 December 1978; Gdynia, Poland
- Died: 5 October 2014 (aged 35); Gdynia, Poland
- Resting place: Polish Navy Cemetery in Gdynia, Oksywie
- Occupations: Actress, model
- Years active: 1997–2014
- Spouse: Dominik Zygra (m. 2000; div. 2001)
- Partner: Jarosław Bieniuk (2001–2014, her death)
- Children: 3

Anna Przybylska (26 December 1978 – 5 October 2014) was a Polish actress and model.

She was chosen, in 2004, to be the Polish ambassador for the ASTOR cosmetics brand. Two years later, she became the European ambassador for ASTOR.

== Biography ==
Anna Przybylska was born in Gdynia.

In June 2000, after only 9 months of dating, she married Dominik Zygra, a businessman. They got divorced after a year. After the divorce, Anna started a relationship with the footballer Jarosław Bieniuk, with whom she had a daughter Oliwia (born 18 October 2002) and two sons: Szymon (born 13 January 2006) and Jan (born 21 March 2011).

At the end of July 2013, she underwent surgery to remove a pancreatic tumor in a clinic in Gdańsk. She was also treated in Switzerland. After fighting pancreatic cancer for approximately a year, she died on 5 October 2014 at her home in Gdynia. On 9 October 2014 she was buried in the grave of her father, in the cemetery at the Parish of St. Michael the Archangel in Gdynia.

== Media about her life ==
A biography was published in 2017 on her life called Ania, written by Grzegorz Kubicki and Maciej Drzewicki. The book was published in Polish.

A documentary film about her life, Ania, was released in 2022.

== Filmography ==
- Złotopolscy (1997, TV series) as Marylka Baka
- Ciemna strona Wenus (1997) as Suczka
- Lot 001 (1999) as Julia
- Sezon na Leszcza (2000) as a girl
- Lokatorzy (2001) as Krysia's sister
- Career of Nikos Dyzma (2002) as Jadzia
- Rób swoje ryzyko jest Twoje (2002) as Beata
- Rózowa noc (2002) as Donata Fiok
- Daleko od noszy (2003, TV series) as Doctor Karina
- Królowa chmur (2004) as Kasia
- Pojedynek mistrzów (2004)
- RH+ (2005) as Marta
- Solidarność, Solidarność (2005) as secretary
- Wszyscy jesteśmy Chrystusami (2006)
- Ryś (2006) as Jolka
- Dlaczego nie! (2006) as star
- Lekcja pana Kuki (2007) as Alicja
- Warsaw Dark a.k.a. Izolator (2008) as call-girl
- Złoty Środek (2009) as Mirka and Mirek
- Klub Szalonych Dziewic (2010) as Karolina
- Bilet na księżyc (2013) as Halina "Roksana"
