= Ignacy Liss =

Polish actor (born 1998)

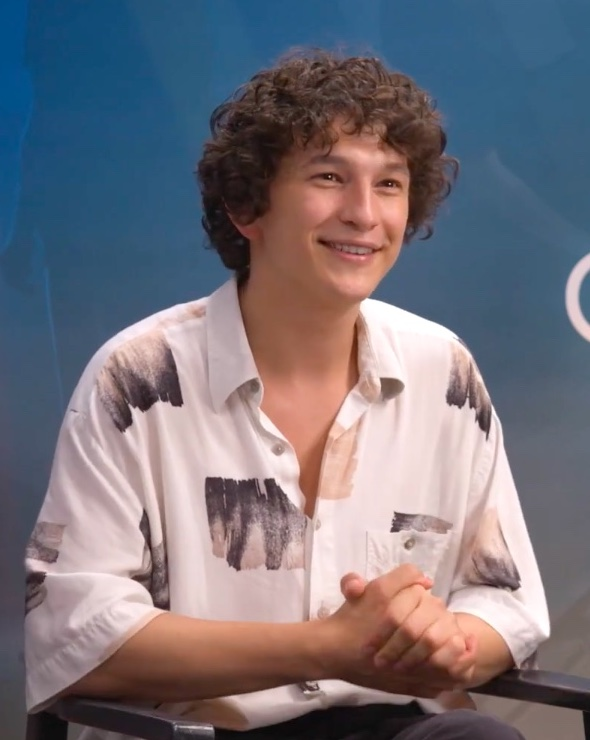
- Liss in 2021
- Born: Ignacy Jan Liss; 16 February 1998 (age 28); Tczew, Poland
- Education: National Academy of Dramatic Art
- Occupation: Actor
- Years active: 2019–present
- Spouse: Maria Wende (m. 2024)
- Relatives: Aleksandra Justa (aunt)

Ignacy Jan Liss (Polish pronunciation: [iɡˈnatsɨ ˈlis]; born 16 February 1998) is a Polish actor. He is best known for his roles as Adam in the Netflix supernatural thriller television series Open Your Eyes (2021) and Count Leszek Czyński in the drama film Forgotten Love (2023).

== Early life ==
Liss was born to musician parents. He has three siblings, and his maternal aunt is actress Aleksandra Justa. He grew up in Tczew, where he attended music school. He plays the clarinet, drums, and piano, and was in a band with his cousins for six years.

As a teenager, he began acting at the Danuta Baduszkowa Musical Theatre and the Gdynia Film Center. He later attended the Aleksander Zelwerowicz National Academy of Dramatic Art in Warsaw, graduating in 2022.

== Career ==
As a second-year student at the National Academy of Dramatic Art, Liss made his professional stage debut in the play Boże mój, directed by Andrzej Seweryn, at the Teatr Polonia in 2019. The following year, he played Dawid in the anthology film Erotica 2022. In 2021, he starred as Paweł in the Netflix supernatural thriller television series Open Your Eyes.

In 2024, he played Adolf in the play Dom otwarty, directed by Krystyna Janda, at the Arnold Szyfman Polish Theatre in Warsaw. The following year, he played Robert in the film Photosensitive, directed by Tadeusz Śliwa. At the 2026 Series Mania, he won the award for Best Actor for his role as Filip in the HBO Max television series Proud.

== Personal life ==
Liss was raised Catholic. He married makeup artist Maria Wende in 2024. They have one child.

== Acting credits ==
=== Film ===
Year	Title	Role	Ref.
2020	Zieja	Krzysiek	
2020	Erotica 2022	Dawid	
2022	March '68	Janek Wolicki	
2022	Zadra	Bartek Bystroń	
2023	Fanfic	Maks	
2023	Forgotten Love	Leszek Czyński	
2023	Miłość ma cztery łapy	Kacper	
2024	Idź pod prąd	Eugeniusz Olejarczyk	
2025	Photosensitive	Robert	

=== Television ===
Year	Title	Role	Notes	Ref.
2019	Wartime Girls	Piotr	1 episode	
2019–2021	Lepsza połowa	Kamil	16 episodes	
2020	Komisarz Alex	Maks Adamski	1 episode	
2020	Ludzie i bogowie	Janek	1 episode	
2020	Osiecka	Ludwik Wawrzyniak	2 episodes	
2021	Open Your Eyes	Adam	6 episodes	
2022	Crusade	Jacek Kotarbowy	1 episode	
2023	Kres niewinności	Janek Wolicki	4 episodes	
2023	Sortownia	Tomek	4 episodes	
2023	Still Here	Karol	3 episodes	
2023–2024	Teściowie	Lucjan Ledwoń	30 episodes	
2026–present	Proud	Filip Raczyński	Main role	

=== Theater ===
Year	Title	Role	Venue	Ref.
2019	Boże mój	Lior	Teatr Polonia	
2019	Śmieszne miłości	Edward	Teatr WARSawy	
2021	Antigone	Haemon	National Academy of Dramatic Art	
2022	Tartuff	Damis	Theatre Scena STU	
2023	Lord of the Flies	Jack	Och-Teatr	
2024	Henry IV, Part 1	Ned Poins	Arnold Szyfman Polish Theatre	
2024	Dom otwarty	Adolf	Arnold Szyfman Polish Theatre	

== Awards and nominations ==
Award	Year	Category	Nominated work	Result	Ref.
Series Mania	2026	Best Actor	Proud	Won	
