= Small Prophets =

British sitcom

- Genre: Comedy drama; Fantasy
- Created by: Mackenzie Crook
- Written by: Mackenzie Crook
- Directed by: Mackenzie Crook
- Starring: Pearce Quigley; Mackenzie Crook; Michael Palin; Paul Kaye; Lauren Patel; Sophie Willan; Jon Pointing
- Country of origin: United Kingdom
- Original language: English
- No. of series: 1
- No. of episodes: 6

Production
- Executive producers: Mackenzie Crook; Lisa Thomas; Christine Gernon; Emma Strain
- Producer: Gill Isles
- Running time: 28–29 minutes
- Production companies: Treasure Trove; Blue House; Hot Olives Productions

Original release
- Network: BBC Two
- Release: 9 February 2026 – present

Small Prophets is a British comedy drama television series created, written and directed by Mackenzie Crook. Filmed in the Manchester area, it stars Pearce Quigley as a man who turns to alchemy and homunculi in an attempt to learn what happened after his girlfriend disappeared, with the cast also including Crook, Michael Palin, Lauren Patel, Sophie Willan and Jon Pointing. The series premiered on BBC Two and BBC iPlayer on 9 February 2026. In September 2026, Small Prophets was renewed for a second series.

== Premise ==
Michael Sleep is still struggling after his girlfriend, Clea, vanished seven years earlier. Sleep works in a DIY store, visits his dad Brian and hopes for Clea’s return. After receiving an alchemical recipe to create homunculi, he awaits their prophecies, hoping for answers about whether he will ever see her again. As he pursues this, he is helped by a colleague, Kacey, hindered by their unpopular boss, and drawn into conflict with nosey neighbours who become suspicious of what he is doing in his shed.

== Cast ==
- Pearce Quigley as Michael Sleep
- Lauren Patel as Kacey, Michael's co-worker and friend
- Michael Palin as Brian Sleep, Michael's father
- Paul Kaye as Roy, Clea's brother
- Jon Pointing as Clive, Michael's neighbour and Bev's husband
- Ed Kear as Brigham, Michael's co-worker
- Mackenzie Crook as Gordon, Michael's boss at the DIY store
- Sophie Willan as Bev, Michael's neighbour and Clive's wife
- Charlotte Mills as Hilary, an employee at Brian's care home
- Adam Wright as Elliot
- Shola Adewusi as Olive, Michael's neighbour
- Howard Gossington as Bob
- Kathryn Drysdale as Bea
- Rhiannon Clements as Professor Drinkwater

== Episodes ==
No.	Title	Directed by	Written by	Original release date	U.K. viewers (millions)
1	"Down at the Cul-de-Sac"	Mackenzie Crook	Mackenzie Crook	9 February 2026	4.43
Michael works in a DIY store. Each day is just like the one before. He trolls the customers and argues with his manager, Gordon. He often leaves work to visit his father, Brian, in his retirement home. Occasionally, he is visited by Roy, the brother of Clea, Michael's girlfriend who disappeared seven years ago. Michael refuses to believe she is dead and waits for her return, even though everyone around him is sure it is hopeless. During one of his visits, his father tells him about homunculi — tiny, humanoid creatures that can answer all your questions if you raise them correctly. Michael thinks it is nonsense, but later he finds his father's journal in the shed, complete with a photograph of a grown homunculus.
2	"Is this Legal?"	Mackenzie Crook	Mackenzie Crook	16 February 2026	4.67
At work, Michael gradually bonds with a younger colleague, Kacey, united by their shared sense of humour. On his way home, he spots some discarded large glass jars and takes them. Gathering the ingredients (rainwater, antique silver coins, amethyst crystals, a gold ring, lavender, frankincense, basil, and more), Michael sets up a laboratory in his shed. He starts his homunculi: a knight, a peasant, a monk, a seraph, a queen, and a king. That evening, Michael goes to the pub, gets drunk, and tells Kacey about the homunculi. Back in the shed, he accidentally knocks a jar, bringing a creature to life.
3	"Should I be Scared?"	Mackenzie Crook	Mackenzie Crook	23 February 2026	4.56
In the morning three homunculi awaken in their jars: the King, the Queen, and the Seraph. Michael's car is broken, so he walks to work. Along the way, he sees a wrecked security van from which teenagers are stealing coins. Michael's friendship with Kacey deepens. She comes over to his place where Michael shows her one of the creatures, and Kacey freaks out. Michael's neighbour, Bev, spots the creatures through her binoculars while spying on the shed.
4	"The Birds of America"	Mackenzie Crook	Mackenzie Crook	2 March 2026	4.80
Michael continues to have strange dreams about birds. He orders a pile of manure for the creatures' maturation. He and Kacey bury the jars, and the neighbours grow increasingly displeased. Michael learns that someone visited his father, pretending to be Roy, and rushes to the retirement home. A woman and a man, claiming to be friends of Clea, are trying to befriend Roy to get a valuable 'bird book' that Clea allegedly stole from an antique shop. Roy, upon learning the book is worth several million pounds, decides to get it himself. That night, a meteorite falls through Michael's roof.
5	"Who's Gonna Make Me Laugh?"	Mackenzie Crook	Mackenzie Crook	9 March 2026	4.86
Michael visits his father and notices something strange. Unfamiliar people appear near Michael's house, surveying the garden. They are being watched by Elliot, a teenager from the close. In the attic, Michael finds the damaged box and hides it, just before Roy arrives. Meanwhile the homunculi have matured and reached the stage of divination, now able to answer questions. Michael decides to ask about his missing girlfriend.
6	"The Wise Man's Song"	Mackenzie Crook	Mackenzie Crook	16 March 2026	4.69
The next day Michael runs out of rainwater and goes to the canal. While he is gone, Clive, a neighbour, breaks into his shed and finds the homunculi, but is scared off by Kacey, who is sleeping there. Kacey does not seal the lid of one jar properly. In Michael's absence, Roy enters his house and starts removing the boxes left from Clea. Michael and Kacey learn the creatures have very little attention span left, and every question brings them closer to their end. They rush home, and Michael learns that Clea is alive, but will not be coming home, and that she loves him. The meteorite had pierced the rare book that Roy was searching for. Kacey managed to ask for the lottery numbers, and Michael prepares to go to Canada, the source of mysterious phone calls he has been receiving. The episode closes with the caption: "To be continued".

== Production ==
In May 2025, the BBC commissioned the six-part sitcom Small Prophets, created, written and directed by Mackenzie Crook. The series is produced by Treasure Trove, Blue House and Hot Olives Productions, with Gill Isles as producer, and Crook serving as an executive producer alongside Lisa Thomas, Christine Gernon, and Emma Strain. Crook has said his idea for the series part-came from a footnote in a book about Swiss alchemist Paracelsus. The theme tune "The Wise Man's Song" is written by musician Cinder Well exclusively for the series.. American electronic musician Steve Roach created the "mystical atmospheres for the prophet revealing creatures".

The series includes animation by Ainslie Henderson and Will Anderson. It was filmed in Greater Manchester, with scenes shot on location in residential streets in Urmston, at the Wickes store and Covent Garden café in Stockport, the Garrick's Head pub in Flixton, and along the Bridgewater Canal under the M60 at junction 7.

On 8 September 2026, the BBC confirmed that Small Prophets would return for a second series, which will move from BBC Two to BBC One. The six-part series will be written and directed by Crook and produced by Isles.

== Release ==
The series premiered on BBC Two on 9 February 2026, with new episodes airing weekly. All episodes were released on BBC iPlayer the same day in the UK.

The series made its American and selected international regions debut on the Apple TV streaming service; the first two episodes were released on 7 October 2026.

== Reception ==
=== Viewership ===
The show averaged 6.3 million over 28 days. The first episode attracted 7.7 million viewers over 28 days, up to 9.2 million as of 8 September 2026.

=== Critical response ===
The review aggregator website Rotten Tomatoes reported an 100% approval rating, based on 22 reviews. Metacritic, which uses a weighted average, assigned a score of 87 out of 100 based on 33 critics, indicating "universal acclaim".

The series received five stars in The Guardian, where it was described as a "show full of gorgeous surprises" and "pure, pure pleasure". The series was given four stars in The Daily Telegraph, where it was described as "eccentric, funny, sweet, and sad – often all at once" with praise for the performances of Quigley and Palin. The series also received five stars in The Times with Crook praised for his "joyous storytelling" that "can make you feel strangely and intensely alive". The show won the award for "best series in the international panorama competition" at Series Mania 2026.

== See also ==
- Detectorists
