= Jan Rybkowski =

Polish film director (1912–1987)

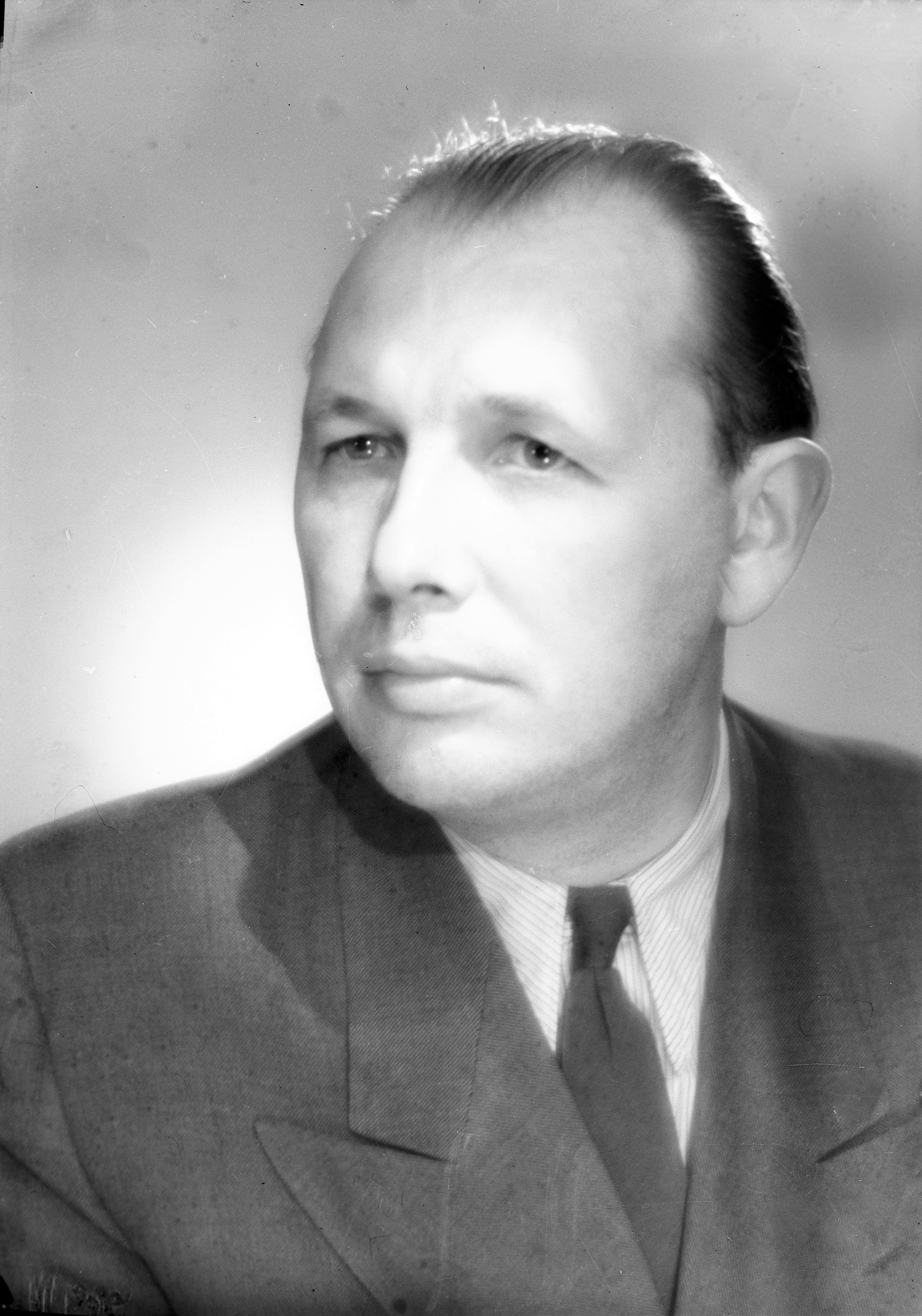
- Born: 4 April 1912; Ostrowiec Świętokrzyski, Congress Poland
- Died: 29 December 1987 (aged 75); Konstancin-Jeziorna, Mazowieckie, Poland
- Occupation: Film director
- Years active: 1949–1984

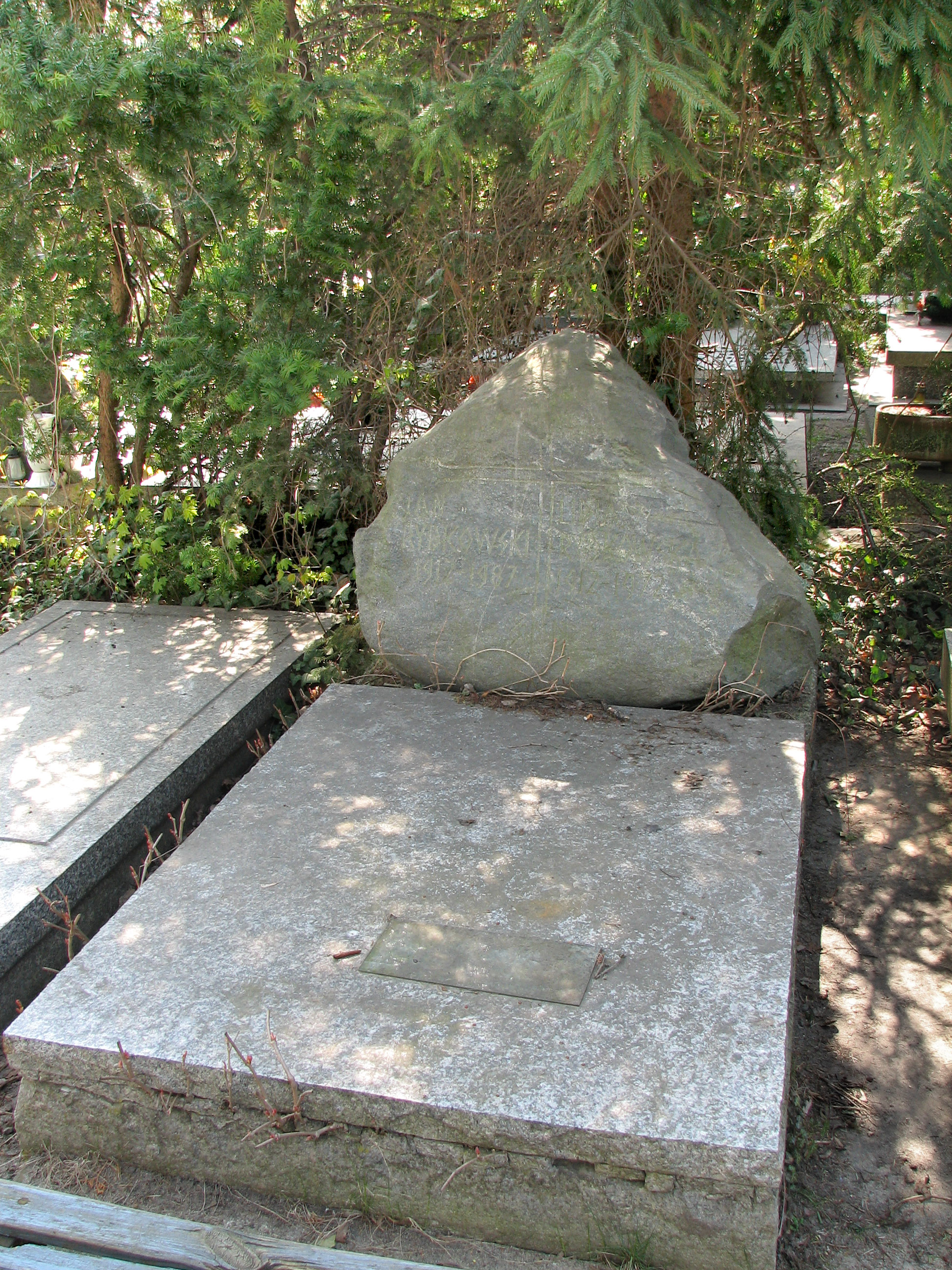
Grave of Jan Rybkowski at the Powązki Military Cemetery in Warsaw

Jan Izydor Rybkowski (4 April 1912 – 29 December 1987) was a Polish film director. He directed 30 films between 1949 and 1984. His 1961 film Tonight a City Will Die was entered into the 2nd Moscow International Film Festival. Two years later, he was a member of the jury at the 3rd Moscow International Film Festival.

== Selected filmography ==
- Warsaw Premiere (1951)
- Nikodem Dyzma (1956)
- Kapelusz pana Anatola (1957)
- Pan Anatol szuka miliona (1958)
- Inspekcja pana Anatola (1959)
- Tonight a City Will Die (1961)
- Spotkanie w "Bajce" aka Meeting in the Fable (1962)
- Chłopi (TV series) (1972) by novel of Władysław Reymont
- The Peasants (1973)
- Gniazdo (1974)
- Border (1977) by novel of Zofia Nałkowska
- Rodzina Połanieckich (TV series) (1978) by novel of Henryk Sienkiewicz
- Kariera Nikodema Dyzmy (TV series) (1980) by novel of Tadeusz Dołęga-Mostowicz
