= Roman Wilhelmi =

Polish theatre and film actor

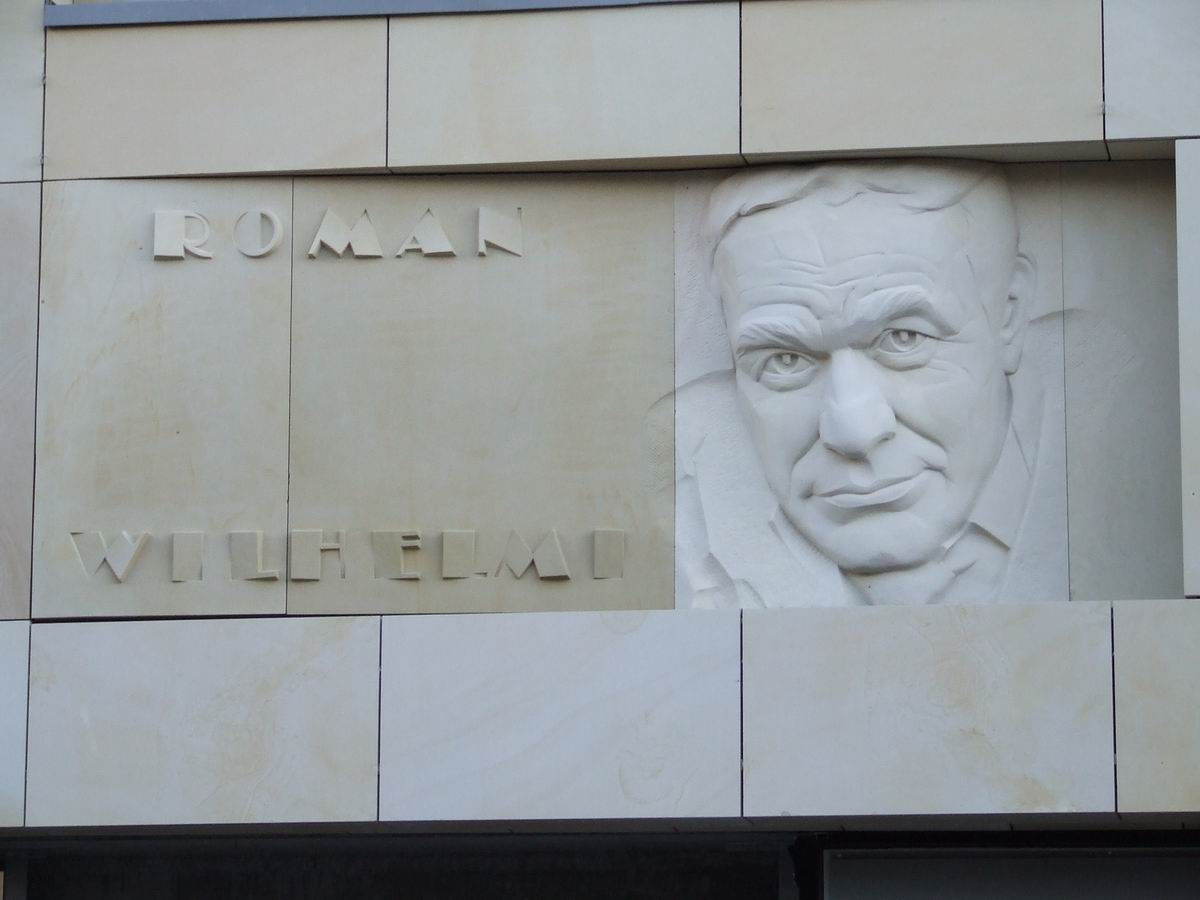
- Born: 6 June 1936; Poznań, Poland
- Died: 3 November 1991 (aged 55); Warsaw, Poland
- Burial place: Wilanów Cemetery
- Years active: 1958–1991

Roman Zdzisław Wilhelmi (June 6, 1936 in Poznań – November 3, 1991 in Warsaw) was a Polish theatre and film actor, notable for his roles in two of the most popular Polish television series of the 1980s.

In 1958, he graduated from the National Higher School of Theatre in Warsaw and started his career in various Warsaw-based theatres. A talented young actor, he also appeared in numerous films of the time. His stage debut was the role of Stanley in Tennessee Williams' A Streetcar Named Desire. In 1960, he debuted on screen in the role of Jamot in Aleksander Ford's Teutonic Knights, based on Henryk Sienkiewicz's novel, The Teutonic Knights.

The following years he made his appearance in the role of Olgierd Jarosz in Four Tank Men And A Dog, one of the most popular Polish television series ever. This role gained him much popularity in Poland and made him one of the most popular Polish actors of the time. Other of his notable roles include the appearance as Fornalski in Zaklęte rewiry based on a prose by Henryk Worcell, Nikodemus Dyzma in Career of Nicodemus Dyzma based on a popular novel by Tadeusz Dołęga-Mostowicz and as Stanisław Anioł, an autocratic janitor in Alternatywy 4 TV series. As a stage actor he continued to act in Warsaw-based Ateneum and Nowy theatres. Among the notable roles were Lovka in Sunset by Isaac Babel, the lead role in Peer Gynt by Henrik Ibsen, McMurphy in One Flew Over the Cuckoo's Nest by Ken Kesey and Danton in Danton's Death by Georg Büchner.

In 1981 he won the award for Best Actor at the 12th Moscow International Film Festival for his role in The Moth.

He died of liver cancer on November 3, 1991 in Warsaw.

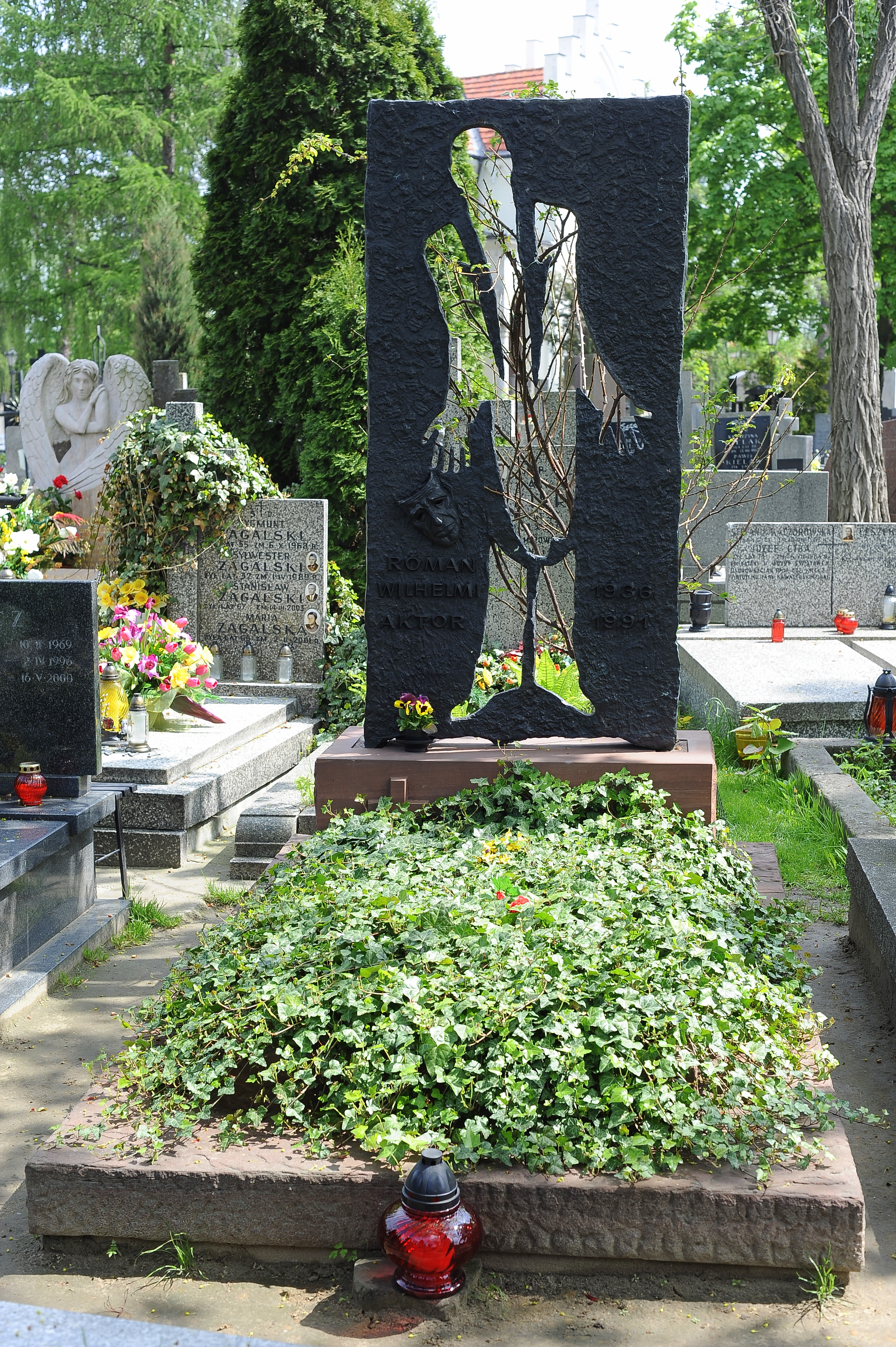
The grave of Roman Wilhelmi in Wilanów cemetery
