= Proud (TV series) =

Polish drama television series

- Genre: Drama
- Written by: Karol Klementewicz; Monika Pęcikiewicz
- Directed by: Karol Klementewicz
- Starring: Ignacy Liss; Maria Sobocińska; Kamil Studnicki; Mateusz Więcławek; Joanna Kulig; Alicja Lewczuk; Maja Ostaszewska; Pawel Tomaszewski
- Composer: Łukasz Targosz
- Country of origin: Poland
- Original language: Polish
- No. of seasons: 1
- No. of episodes: 8

Production
- Producer: Bogumił Lipski
- Cinematography: Weronika Bilska
- Editors: Alan Zejer; Kamil Grzybowski
- Running time: 32–42 minutes
- Production companies: TVN Warner Bros. Discovery; HBO Polska; Magnolia Films

Original release
- Network: HBO Max
- Release: 12 June 2026 – present

Proud is a Polish drama television series written by Karol Klementewicz and Monika Pęcikiewicz, directed by Klementewicz, and produced by Bogumił Lipski. It stars Ignacy Liss as Filip, a young gay man who ends up a dad to his late sister's daughter.

Proud premiered on HBO Max on June 12, 2026 to positive reviews from critics. At the 2026 Series Mania television festival, it won Grand Prix in International Competition and Best Actor for Ignacy Liss.

== Premise ==
Filip Raczyński is a 20-something hard-partying gay fashion model who lives with his sister and her child Tosia. After losing his sister, Filip ends up caring for and then looks to adopt Tosia.

== Cast ==
=== Main ===
- Ignacy Liss as Filip Raczyński
- Maria Sobocińska as Kiki, Filip's friend
- Kamil Studnicki as Olek
- Mateusz Więcławek as Paweł
- Joanna Kulig as Teresa Mielnicz, a lawyer
- Alicja Lewczuk as Tosia, Anka's daughter and Filip's niece
- Maja Ostaszewska as Beata, Filip's neighbor

=== Supporting ===
- Sylwia Boroń as Anka Raczyńska, Filip's sister and Tosia's mother
- Marcin Miodek as Adam Nowak, dad of Nina
- Paweł Tomaszewski as Marek
- Amelia Fijałkowska as Nina, Kiki's and Adam's daughter
- Piotr Pacek as Krzysztof
- Dorota Kolak as Olga, Krzysztof's mother and Tosia's grandmother

== Episodes ==
No.	Title	Directed by	Written by	Original release date
1	"Episode 1"	Karol Klementewicz	Karol Klementewicz & Monika Pecikiewicz	12 June 2026
2	"Episode 2"	Karol Klementewicz	Karol Klementewicz & Monika Pecikiewicz	19 June 2026
3	"Episode 3"	Karol Klementewicz	Karol Klementewicz & Monika Pecikiewicz	26 June 2026
4	"Episode 4"	Karol Klementewicz	Karol Klementewicz & Monika Pecikiewicz	3 July 2026
5	"Episode 5"	Karol Klementewicz	Karol Klementewicz & Monika Pecikiewicz	10 July 2026
6	"Episode 6"	Karol Klementewicz	Karol Klementewicz & Monika Pecikiewicz	17 July 2026
7	"Episode 7"	Karol Klementewicz	Karol Klementewicz & Monika Pecikiewicz	24 July 2026
8	"Episode 8"	Karol Klementewicz	Karol Klementewicz & Monika Pecikiewicz	31 July 2026

== Reception ==
The series received positive reviews from both Polish and international critics.

Television critic Jack Seale from the British newspaper The Guardian gave it 4 out of 5 stars wrote in his review: "This Polish drama is beautifully shot, darkly funny and full of social commentary about the difficulty of being a gay father in Poland. Even the toddler seems like an accomplished actor".
