= Pierścień i róża =

1987 film by Jerzy Gruza

Pierscien i róża ("Ring and Rose") is a 1987 Polish musical film directed by Jerzy Gruza and starring Katarzyna Figura, Stefan Kazuro and Katarzyna Cygan. It is an adaptation of the 1854 novel The Rose and the Ring by the British writer William Makepeace Thackeray.

== Cast ==
- Katarzyna Figura as Rosalba
- Stefan Kazuro as Prince Giglio
- Katarzyna Cygan as Princess Angelika
- Zbigniew Zamachowski as Prince Bulbo
- Wanda Dembek as Old Gruffanuff
- Ewa Kuculis as Young Gruffanuff
- Ludwik Benoit as Captain Hedzoff
- Zdzislawa Specht as Black Fairy
- Bernard Ladysz as King Valorozo
- Krystyna Tkacz as Queen
