= The Rose and the Ring =

1854 novel by William Makepeace Thackeray

The Rose and The Ring is a satirical work of fantasy fiction written by William Makepeace Thackeray, originally published on Christmas in 1854, though the first edition is dated 1855. It criticises, to some extent, the attitudes of the monarchy and those at the top of society and challenges their ideals of beauty and marriage.

Set in the fictional countries of Paflagonia and Crim Tartary (named after historical lands, but having nothing to do with them except the names), the story revolves around the lives and fortunes of four young royal cousins, Princesses Angelica and Rosalba, and Princes Bulbo and Giglio. Each page is headed by a line of poetry summing up the plot at that point and the storyline as a whole is laid out, as the book states, as "A Fireside Pantomime". The original edition had illustrations by Thackeray who had once intended a career as an illustrator.

== Plots ==
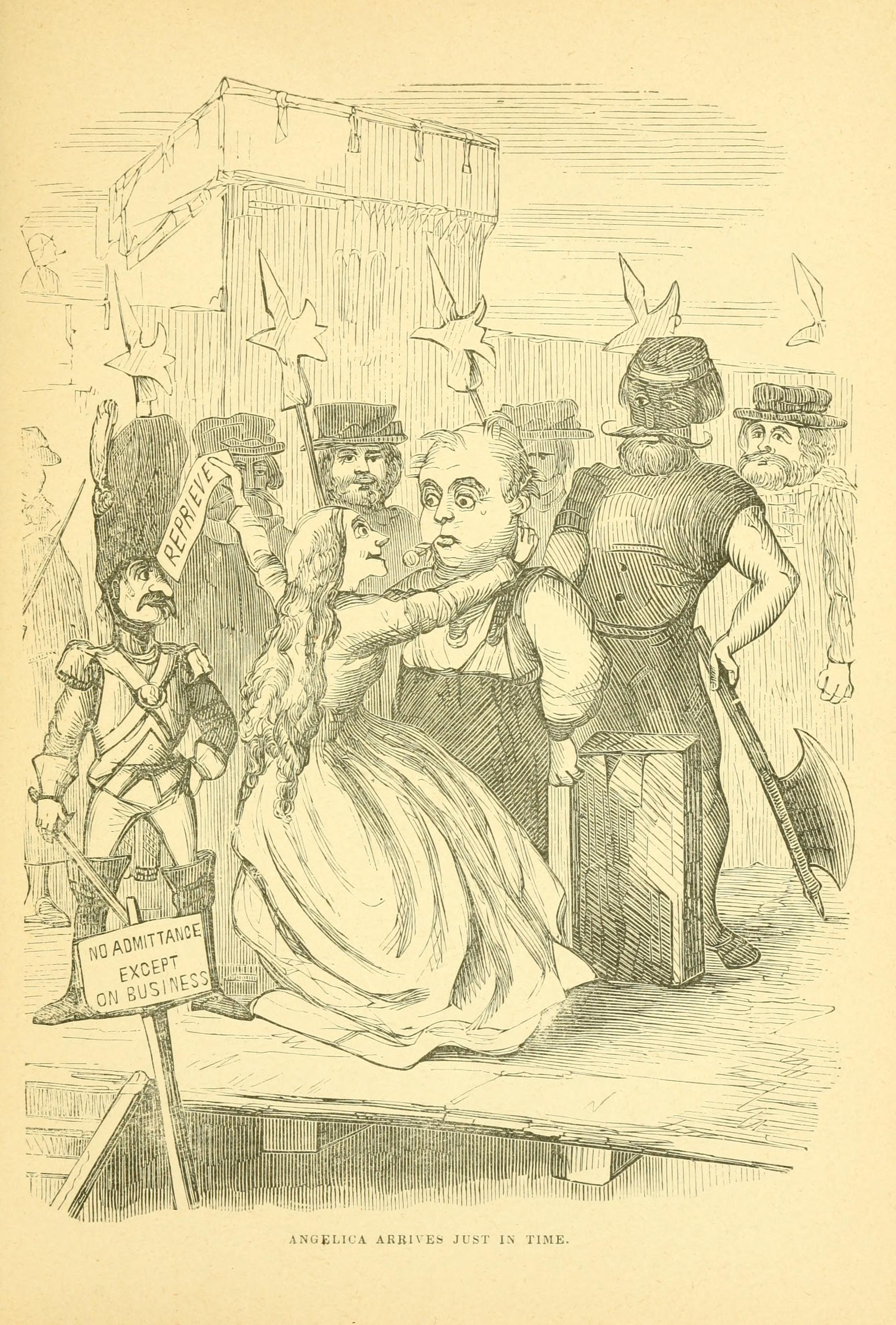
Illustration

The plot opens on the royal family of Paflagonia eating breakfast together: King Valoroso, his wife, the Queen, and their daughter, Princess Angelica. Through the course of the meal it is discovered that Prince Bulbo, heir to the neighbouring kingdom of Crim Tartary, and son of King Padella is coming to visit Paflagonia. It is also discovered, after the two women have left the table, that King Valoroso stole his crown, and all his wealth, from his nephew, Prince Giglio, when the prince was an infant.

Prince Giglio and Princess Angelica have been brought up together very closely, Princess Angelica being considered the most beautiful and wisest girl in the kingdom and Giglio being much overlooked in the household. Giglio, besotted with his cousin, has given her a ring belonging to his mother, which, unknown to them, was given to her by the Fairy Blackstick and which held the power to make the wearer beautiful to everyone who beheld them. After an argument with Giglio, about the arrival of the long-awaited Prince Bulbo, Angelica throws the ring out of the window and can be seen for her own, less attractive self.

Prince Bulbo, in his turn, possesses a magic rose, with the same power as the ring and coming from the same source: the Fairy Blackstick. Upon his arrival, this causes Angelica to be madly in love with him.

Angelica's governess, Countess Gruffanuff, finds the magic ring in the garden and, whilst wearing it, convinces Giglio to sign a paper swearing to marry her. She then gives the ring to Angelica's maid, Betsinda, an orphan discovered by the family with a torn cloak in her possession. The maid, however, is actually Rosalba, the only child of the true king of Crim Tartary. When Betsinda wears the ring to take the warming pan around the bedrooms, Princes Bulbo and Giglio immediately fall in love with her, along with King Valoroso. This excites the rage of The Queen, Angelica and Gruffanuff, and causes Betsinda to be driven from the house.

In response to Giglio's rudeness, Valoroso orders him to be executed, but his Captain of the Guards, Count Kutasoff Hedzoff, takes Bulbo to the scaffold instead, where he is reprieved at the last moment by Angelica, who takes his rose, returns to her former beauty and marries him.

Giglio is forced to flee and, with some help from The Fairy Blackstick, disguises himself as a student. In the meantime Rosalba has returned to Crim Tartary and discovered her heritage by means of the torn cloak, which is reunited with its other half to make the words "Princess Rosalba". King Padella, after his offer of marriage is refused, orders Rosalba to be thrown to the lions. Giglio, upon hearing this, takes back his throne in Paflagonia and leads his army to rescue Rosalba, using the captured Bulbo as a hostage.

When Padella refuses the exchange, Giglio decides that he had better keep his word and put Bulbo to death as threatened. However, the lions set upon Rosalba happen to be exactly the same lions which she grew up with in the wild, prior to being found by Princess Angelica, and carry her on their backs to Giglio's camp, where the pair are reunited.

Giglio and Rosalba return to Paflagonia along with Bulbo, now wearing the fairy ring. When they sit down to breakfast on their wedding day, Gruffanuff produces the paper pledging Giglio to herself. Wishing to put him in his place for his earlier arrogance, the Fairy Blackstick refuses to help at first and Giglio is forced to take Gruffanuff to the church in Rosalba's place. However, when they reach the building, The Fairy Blackstick transforms the doorknocker back into Gruffanuff's real husband, long believed dead after being bewitched by the fairy herself many years before. Giglio and Rosalba are then free to marry and do so. The Fairy Blackstick then leaves, never to be heard of again.

== Characters ==
Many of the names of characters are Italian:

- Angelica (Princess of Paflagonia) – Italian: angelic and possibly the herb angelica
- Bulbo (Prince of Crim Tartary) – Italian: bulb – the prince's name is also a pun on Cream of Tartar, a bakery ingredient
- Cavolfiore (former King of Crim Tartary) – Italian: cauliflower
- Gambabella (First lord-in-waiting) – Italian: handsome leg
- Giglio (Prince of Paflagonia) – Italian: lily (note: in Italian language Giglio is male gender)
- Padella (King of Crim Tartary) – Italian: frying-pan
- Rosalba – rosa alba, Latin for "white rose" (perhaps suggested by the name of Venetian painter Rosalba Carriera)
- Savio (former King of Paflagonia) – Italian: wise
- Tomaso Lorenzo (Painter in Ordinary to the King of Crim Tartary) – Italianization of Thomas Lawrence.
- Valoroso (King of Paflagonia) – Italian: valiant, clever

Other names are pseudo-Italian, pseudo-German, or pseudo-Russian puns:

- Glumboso (Prime Minister) – "glum"
- Gruffanuff (Lady of Honour) – "gruff enough"
- Hogginarmo – "hog in armour", someone awkwardly dressed
- Kutasoff Hedzoff (Captain of the Guard) – "cuts off heads off" (also a pun on the name of the Russian general Mikhail Illarionovich Kutuzov, and Polish: kutas, which means fringe and male sexual organ)
- Pildrafto (Court Physician) – "pill" and "draught"
- Sleibootz (Bulbo's chamberlain) – "sly-boots" – a nickname meaning a person is too sneakily clever, equivalent to "smarty-pants" and "clever clogs"
- Squaretoso (Lord Chancellor) – "square toes"

== Placenames ==
The placename Paflagonia is an Italian spelling of Paphlagonia, an ancient kingdom on the southern shore of the Black Sea. Crim Tartary is a name for the Crimean Khanate, a medieval state inhabited by the Crimean Tatars (hence "Tartary"), north of the Black Sea. (also: Cream of Tartar is Potassium bitartrate, also known as potassium hydrogen tartrate, with formula KC_{4}H_{5}O_{6}, is a byproduct of winemaking.) These names were presumably suggested by the outbreak of the Crimean War in the same year as the writing of The Rose and the Ring. That these locations are intended is suggested by a scene in which Angelica, mocking Giglio's ignorance, says, "You don't know whether Crim Tartary is on the Red Sea or on the Black Sea, I dare say" – to which Giglio promptly (and erroneously) replies that it is on the Red Sea. Other countries which the King of Paflagonia claims include Cappadocia and Turkey – though the latter, immediately accompanied by the "Sausage Islands", suggests another meaning of the word "turkey". However, in no other respect of language or culture does Thackeray attempt to approximate his fictional countries to either the ancient or medieval kingdoms for which they are named.

The university that Giglio attends is called Bosforo, which is Italian for Bosporus; however, the university described is clearly Oxford University, the meaning of both "Oxford" and "Bosporus" being "place where oxen cross".

Other placenames are either Italian or puns:

- Blombodinga – "plum pudding"
- Poluphloisboio – Greek: πολύφλοισβος "loud-roaring" (as it occurs in the stereotyped Homeric epithet πολυφλοισβοιο θαλασσης "of the loud-roaring sea").
- Rimbombamento – Italian: reverberation

== Reception ==
Japanese filmmaker Hayao Miyazaki included it in his 2010 list of 50 essential children's books.

== Adaptations ==
=== Television ===
- CBS Television Workshop produced a dramatised version on 24 February 1952.
- BBC Television produced the Rose and the Ring as a three-part drama adaptation starting on 24 November 1953. Starring Jacqueline Hill, Joan Benham and John Ruddock.
- BBC Television children's program Jackanory read the book in instalments in 1975. Actor Kenneth Williams of Carry On fame did the readings.
- In Poland a five-episode television series titled Pierścień i róża based on the book was directed by Jerzy Gruza in 1986, starring Katarzyna Figura as Rózia (Rosalba). An abbreviated film version was made as well. Pierścien i róża was made in the style of a musical comedy.
- Loosely adapted in the USSR in 1989 as two-part television musical comedy Don't Leave.... Numerous plot elements were altered, dropped or added: there was no ring; the rose was unearthed by a son of a long-dead dissident and forced people to tell the truth; the finale was open-ended. The satire focused mainly on dishonest politicians.

=== Film ===
- The German film animator Lotte Reiniger made a shadow puppet film of the story in 1979.

=== Radio ===
- A serialised abridgement read by Edgar Metcalfe was broadcast nightly in The Book Reading by Radio National in Australia from December 2008 to January 2009.

=== Opera ===
- Irish composer Ellen O'Hea (1850/1–1880), writing as "Elena Norton", wrote a three-act comic opera of the same title that had three performances in Dublin between 1876 and 1878.
- Sir Nicholas Jackson wrote an opera in two acts based on Thackeray's story, drawiing on harpsichord sonatas by Domenico Scarlatti for the music. It was first performed in Drapers' Hall on 4 May 2016 and the following day in The Charterhouse.

== In popular culture ==
- Andrew Lang's Chronicles of Pantouflia (including Prince Prigio and Prince Ricardo) pays explicit homage to Thackeray's The Rose and the Ring.
- The story is referenced in David Lynch's Twin Peaks: Fire Walk With Me movie. The character Laura Palmer has a book open on her desk with the story visible while she is studying

== Bibliography ==
- The Rose and the Ring (1855) – ISBN 1-4043-2741-X
- Sorensen, Gail D.: "Thackeray's 'The Rose and the Ring': A Novelist's Fairy Tale", in Mythlore, 15.3 (Spring 1989).
- Tremper, Ellen: "Commitment and Escape: The Fairy Tales of Thackeray, Dickens, and Wilde", in The Lion and the Unicorn, 2.1 (1978).
- Thackeray, William M (1990) [1855]. The Rose and the Ring [Die Rose und der Ring oder die Geschichte von Prinz Giglio und Prinz Bulbo]. Translated by Rau, Peter; Scheller, B. Leipzig: Sammlung Dieterich. ISBN 978-3735000583.

== Sources ==
1. Green, Roger Lancelyn (1980). "The Golden Age of Children's Books". In Egoff, Sheila; Stubbs, G T; Ashley, L F (eds.). Only Connect: Readings on Children's Literature. OUP. ISBN 978-0195403091.
2. Simpson, M J (1953), The British Telephantasy Timeline, archived from the original on 10 May 2008
