= Bernard Ładysz =

Polish singer and actor (1922–2020)

- Bernard Ładysz
- Born: 24 July 1922; Wilno, Poland
- Died: 25 July 2020 (aged 98); Warsaw, Poland
- Occupations: Bass-baritone; Actor
- Awards: Honorary doctorate of the Chopin University of Music

Bernard Ładysz (24 July 1922 – 25 July 2020) was a Polish bass-baritone and actor. He performed internationally at major opera houses and festivals, and was known especially for the title roles of Mozart's Don Giovanni and Mussorgsky's Boris Godunov. His recordings include Lucia di Lammermoor alongside Maria Callas. He took part in the world premieres of Krzysztof Penderecki's opera The Devils of Loudon at the Hamburg State Opera and the bass solo in his St Luke Passion at the Salzburg Festival. As an actor, he played in several films such as The Promised Land in 1974.

== Life ==
Born in Wilno, Poland (now Vilnius, Lithuania), Ładysz began to study voice in Wilno in 1940. The following year, he became a sergeant of the Polish Home Army, who took part in the 1944 Operation Tempest. When Wilno was taken by the Red Army, he, among many others, was conscripted to military under the condition of giving an oath to the Soviet Union. Those who refused were sent to various Gulag labor camps in Siberia. Ładysz was imprisoned in Gulag from 1944 to 1946, eventually landing in a camp by Kaluga, Western Russia. Upon release he returned to Poland and continued his studies at Warsaw Conservatory. He first worked from 1946 in the Ceremonial Band of the Polish Army. He made his stage debut in 1950 as Gremin in Tchaikovsky's Eugene Onegin at the Teatr Wielki in Warsaw. He remained a member of the ensemble to 1979.

In 1956, he won the competition in Vercelli, which led to his international recognition. He was then invited to perform at the Teatro Massimo in Palermo. He appeared as Raimondo in a 1959 recording of Donizetti's Lucia di Lammermoor conducted by Tullio Serafin, alongside Maria Callas in the title role, the only Polish singer to sing with her. Guest appearances followed, including engagements in Australia, the Americas and China. He is remembered for the title roles of Mozart's Don Giovanni and Mussorgsky's Boris Godunov, for Philip II in Verdi's Don Carlos, Amonasro in Aida, Mephistophélès in Gounod's Faust, and the title role in Karol Szymanowski's Król Roger. He performed roles also in Stanisław Moniuszko's The Haunted Manor and Halka, Rossini's Il barbiere di Siviglia, Verdi's Les vêpres siciliennes, La forza del destino, Rigoletto, Borodin's Prince Igor, and Tchaikovsky's Iolanta. In musical, he appeared as Tevje in Fiddler on the Roof.

Ładysz performed in the world premieres of works by Krzysztof Penderecki. He appeared as Pater Barré in the opera Die Teufel von Loudun, given in German at the Hamburg State Opera on 20 June 1969. He sang the bass solo in the St Luke Passion at the 1970 Salzburg Festival. He recorded both works, the opera alongside Tatiana Troyanos.

In film, he played the title role in Domenico Cimarosa's Il maestro di cappella. As an actor, he played in eleven films between 1965 and 1999, including The Promised Land (1975), The Quack (1981) and With Fire and Sword (1999).

He was awarded the Commander's Cross with Star of the Order of Polonia Restituta in 2000. In May 2008, he received an honorary doctorate of the Chopin University of Music.

Ładysz died in Warsaw on 25 July 2020, a day after his 98th birthday.

== Awards ==
- 1947 – First Prize, National Vocal Competition in Warsaw
- 1951 – Gold Cross of Merit
- 1956 – First Prize, International Vocal Competition in Vercelli, Italy
- 1974 – Order of the Banner of Labour Class 1
- 2000 – Commander's Cross with Star of the Order of Polonia Restituta (previously awarded the Officer's Cross (1959) and Knight's Cross (1956))
- 2002 – Award from the Ministry of Culture and National Heritage of the Republic of Poland for life achievement
- 2005 - Gold Gloria Artis Medal for Merit to Culture
- 2008 – Honorary doctorate of the Chopin University of Music
- 2009 – Prize of the City of Warsaw

== Film ==
Ładysz appeared in films including:

- The Doll (1968)
- Ziemia obiecana (1974)
- The Quack (1981)
- The Issa Valley (1982)
- Pastorale heroica (1983)
- Pierścień i róża (1986)
- Ogniem i mieczem (1999)
