= Znachor (novel) =

1937 novel by Tadeusz Dołęga-Mostowicz

Znachor (sometimes the title is translated as The Quack) is a 1937 novel by Polish author Tadeusz Dołęga-Mostowicz. It was adapted into three films.

The novel is about a famous surgeon who loses his memory, and wanders far away. The novel pick two decades later. He finds an employment at a sawmill. His memory starts coming back, first the professional skills, and he starts healing people around, becomes sued for illegal medical practice, and eventually he starts recovering the rest of his memory.

== Adaptations ==
- Znachor (1937 film), Polish film directed by Michał Waszyński
- Znachor (1982 film), Polish film directed by Jerzy Hoffman
- Forgotten Love (Polish title: Znachor), 2023 Polish film directed by Michał Gazda
