= Znachor (1982 film) =

1982 film by Jerzy Hoffman

- Directed by: Jerzy Hoffman
- Written by: Jacek Fuksiewicz, Jerzy Hoffman
- Starring: Jerzy Bińczycki; Anna Dymna; Tomasz Stockinger
- Cinematography: Jerzy Gościk, Tomasz Kona
- Edited by: Zenon Piórecki
- Music by: Piotr Marczewski
- Production company: Zespół Filmowy Zodiak
- Distributed by: Zjednoczenie Rozpowszechniania Filmów
- Release date: 12 April 1982
- Running time: 128 min
- Country: Poland
- Language: Polish

Znachor ("healer", "quack") is a 1982 Polish drama film directed by Jerzy Hoffman. The screenplay was written based on the novel with the same name by Tadeusz Dołęga-Mostowicz written in 1937. The first adaptation of the book was filmed the same year the book was written (Znachor, directed by Michał Waszyński).

The film was shot near Bielsk Podlaski.

== Plot ==
Professor Rafał Wilczur (Jerzy Bińczycki) was a successful surgeon in Poland in the early 20th century, whose wife leaves him with their small daughter for another man. Wilczur meets a man named Samuel who asks Wilczur to help him financially. The two men go to a bar and get drunk. Wilczur gets robbed and beaten up and loses his memory after hitting his head. Suffering from amnesia, he ends up in a small village, working as a farm laborer for years and is known there as Kosiba. He eventually starts healing the other villagers, and performs surgery on an injured young woman Maria (Anna Dymna). The existing doctor in the area (Andrzej Kopiczyński) sues Wilczur for using the doctor's surgical instruments. In court for this case, he is recognized as the missing famous surgeon by an expert witness Dobraniecki in the case (Piotr Fronczewski), and he then begins to regain his memory. He then realizes that the young woman he saved is his daughter, and the two are reunited. He is told that his former wife died of tuberculosis shortly after leaving him, and the daughter ended up in an orphanage. Maria then marries Leszek (Tomasz Stockinger), the son of a local nobleman.

== Cast ==
- Jerzy Bińczycki – Professor Rafał Wilczur / Antoni Kosiba, healer
- Anna Dymna – Maria Jolanta Wilczur and Beata Wilczur
- Tomasz Stockinger – Leszek Czyński
- Bernard Ładysz – Prokop
- Piotr Fronczewski – Professor Dobraniecki
- Piotr Grabowski – Zenek
- Artur Barciś – Wasylko, son of Prokop
- Andrzej Kopiczyński – Doctor Pawlicki
- Stefan Paska – Witalis, Prokop's farmhand
- Irena Burawska – Prokop's wife
- Genowefa Korska
- Tadeusz Kożusznik – Franciszek, butler of the Czyński family
- Remigiusz Rogacki
- Bożena Dykiel – Sonia, Prokop's daughter in law
- Igor Śmiałowski – Count Czyński, Leszek's father
- Maria Homerska – Countess Czyńska, Leszek's mother
- Andrzej Szalawski – chairman of the court
- Jerzy Braszka
- Jerzy Trela – Samuel Obiedziński
- Gustaw Lutkiewicz – police leader
- Henryk Dudziński
- Włodzimierz Adamski – Zenek's comrade
- Arkadiusz Bazak – public prosecutor
