= The Career of Nicodemus Dyzma =

1932 novel by Tadeusz Dołęga-Mostowicz

The Career of Nikodemus Dyzma
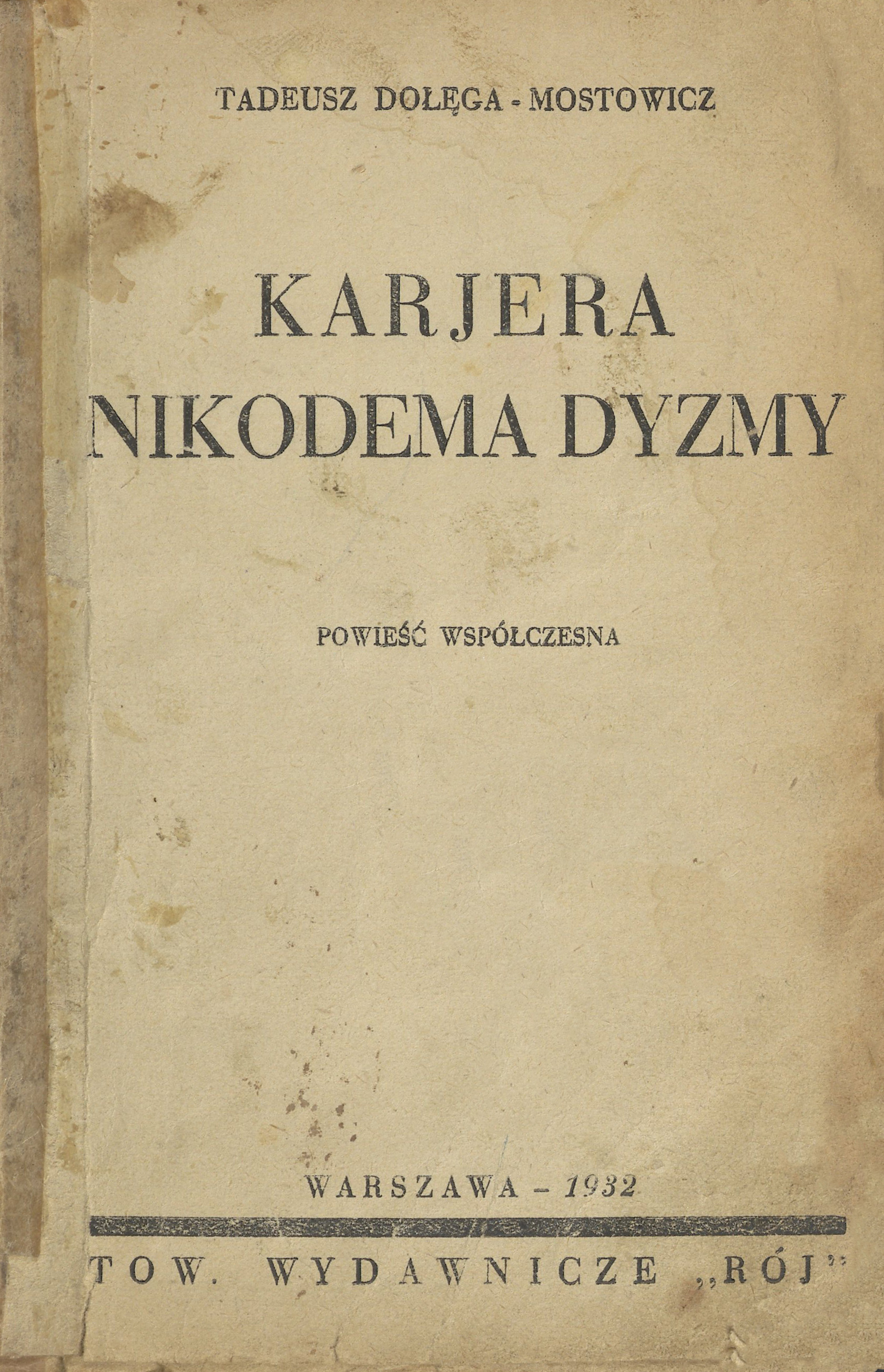
- Title page of the first edition
- Author: Tadeusz Dołęga-Mostowicz
- Original title: Kariera Nikodema Dyzmy
- Translators: Ewa Malachowska-Pasek; Megan Thomas
- Language: Polish
- Genre: Political satire
- Publisher: Towarzystwo Wydawnicze Rój
- Publication date: 1932
- Publication place: Poland
- English publication date: 15 September 2020
- Media type: Print
- Pages: 356 (first edition)
- Original text: Kariera Nikodema Dyzmy at Polish Wikisource

The Career of Nicodemus Dyzma (Polish: Kariera Nikodema Dyzmy) is a political novel by the Polish author Tadeusz Dołęga-Mostowicz. It was serialized in the newspaper ABC from 1 January to 26 May 1931 before being published in book form by Towarzystwo Wydawnicze Rój in 1932.

Having become his first major literary success with immediate material rewards, it prompted Dołęga-Mostowicz to write and publish roughly two books per year (in total, he wrote 17 novels). The book, very popular already in the interwar period, was made into a 1956 film with Adolf Dymsza in the title role, then into a 1980 television miniseries starring Roman Wilhelmi, and into a 2002 film starring Cezary Pazura.

== Plot ==
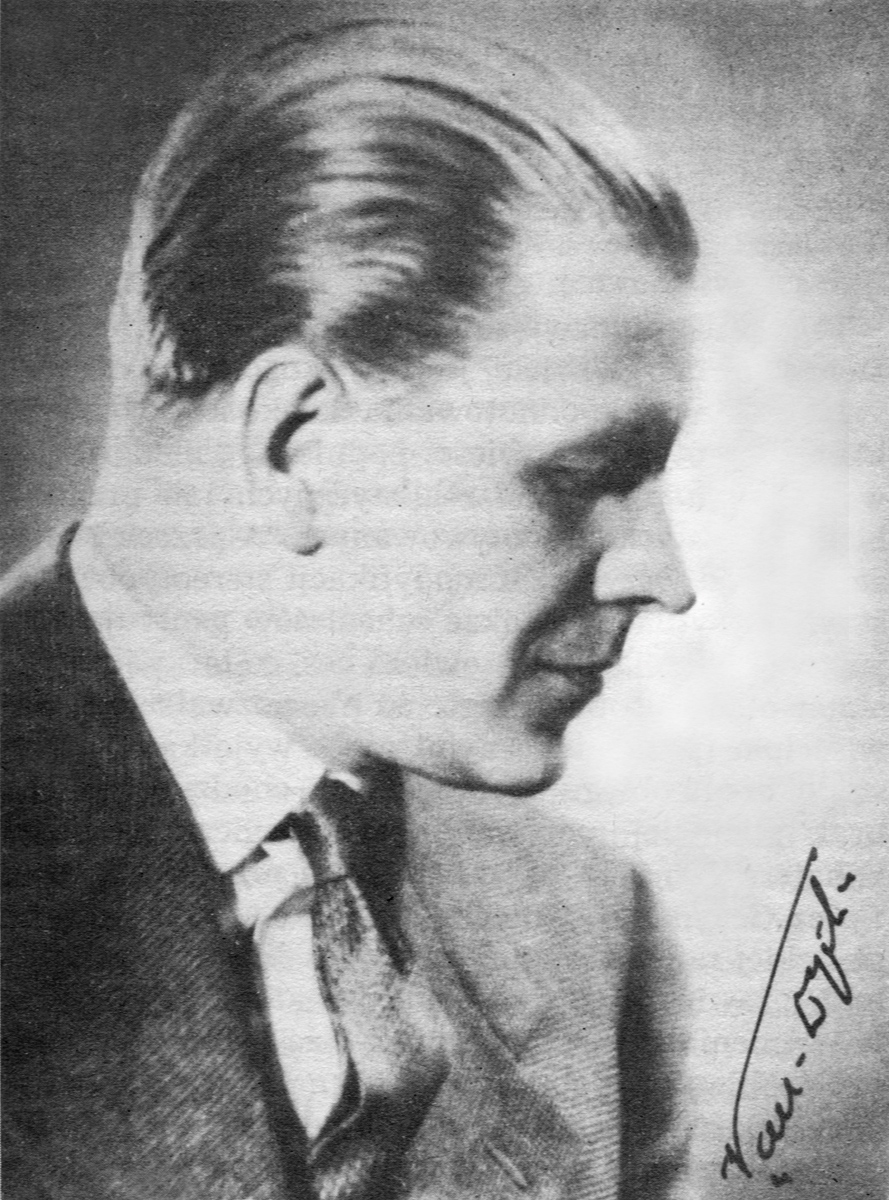
Tadeusz Dołęga-Mostowicz

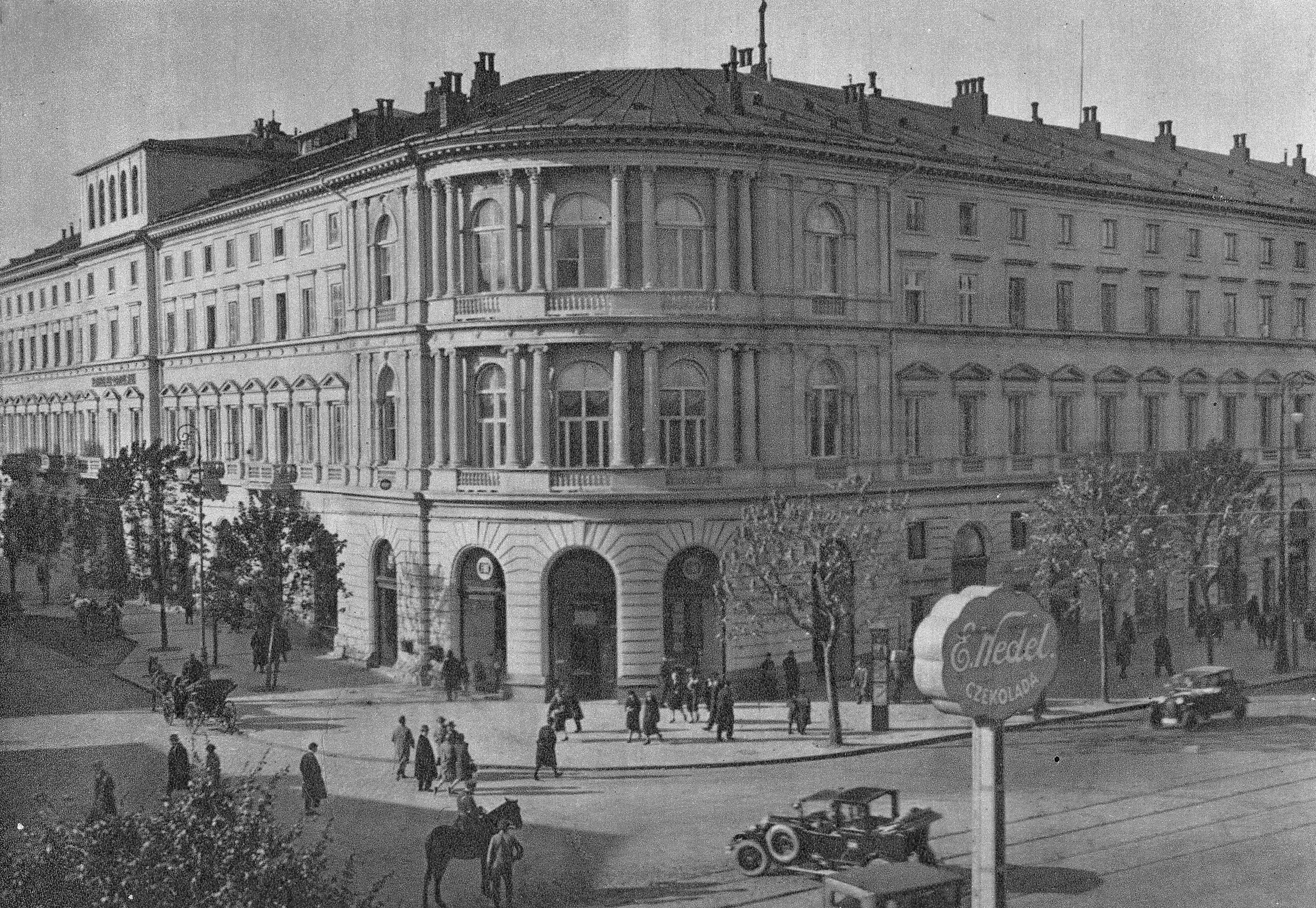
Hotel Europejski

Nicodemus Dyzma is a small-town man who comes to the Polish capital from the Eastern provinces (known as "Kresy") in search of work. While walking the streets of Warsaw, he finds a lost invitation to a reception at the Hotel Europejski. Hoping for a free meal, he decides to use it because he owns a tuxedo.

At the reception, he befriends a member of parliament and wins the hearts of guests with his attitude. He is introduced to a wealthy landowner named Kunicki, a former con artist, who is so impressed by Dyzma that he offers him a job as superintendent of his country estate.

At the estate, Dyzma meets Kunicki's wife, Nina, who falls in love with him, but he earns the distaste of Kunicki's daughter, Kasia, a lesbian who had been carrying on an affair with Nina. Dyzma soon takes control of all affairs at the estate and starts to climb the social and political ladder.

He is offered a series of prestigious appointments and is forced to hide his past from the prying eyes of adversaries and the general public. His lack of knowledge about things that are expected of him is taken either as his humour or eccentricities, or by his underlings as attempts to test them.

Dyzma's rise in status is not good for his morals, as eventually he commissions the murder of his former boss from the provinces who might have revealed the truth of Dyzma's background. Ultimately he marries Nina and decides to refuse a commendation to become prime minister of Poland for fear that his pretenses will be revealed.

== Background ==
Dołęga-Mostowicz was a journalist critical of the Polish interbellum political movement, Sanation, and its founder, Józef Piłsudski. Dołęga-Mostowicz was abducted by a group of soldiers in mufti, beaten up, and dumped outside Warsaw. He wrote the novel as a critique of the political class then in power.

== Legacy ==
Nicodemus Dyzma has become proverbial in Poland as an archetype of the crude opportunist who makes his upwardly mobile way by dint of fortuitous connections, ruthlessness and the acquiescence of an oblivious society.

He is forced by the spirit of his times and the society around him to become something they need him to become. Ignorant and malleable, Dyzma becomes a puppet in the hands of the elite class. Whatever happens to him during his climb of the social ladder falls outside of his mental, financial and legal competence.

The novel's title has served as the title of a song by Jacek Kaczmarski, presenting the viewpoint of Dyzma's eventual brother-in-law, Żorż Ponimirski, who eventually reveals the truth about Dyzma's past but is not believed.

The name has been historically used as pejorative, or mocking, description of various politicians in post–1989 Poland but has fallen out of popular use by the turn of the millennium.

== Controversy ==
An American novel, Being There (1971), by fellow Polish native Jerzy Kosiński, has been said to bear a strong resemblance to the exploits of Nicodemus Dyzma. In June 1982, a Village Voice article by Geoffrey Stokes and Eliot Fremont-Smith accused Kosiński of plagiarizing Dołęga-Mostowicz, whose best-selling novel was largely unknown to English-readers at the time of Kosiński's 1970 publication.

The article further claimed that all of Kosiński's novels, including Being There, had been ghostwritten or possibly translated from Polish by his "assistant editors", pointing to striking stylistic differences among them and sparking further authorship controversies about Kosiński's literary output.

== Translation ==
Ewa Malachowska-Pasek and Megan Thomas translated the novel into English in 2018. Their translation was published on 15 September 2020 by Northwestern University Press, with an introduction by Benjamin Paloff. The translation won the Found in Translation Award for 2021.

== See also ==
- List of Polish people § Prose literature
- Political fiction
- Jerzy Kosiński § Plagiarism allegations
