= Kuba Czekaj =

Polish filmmaker

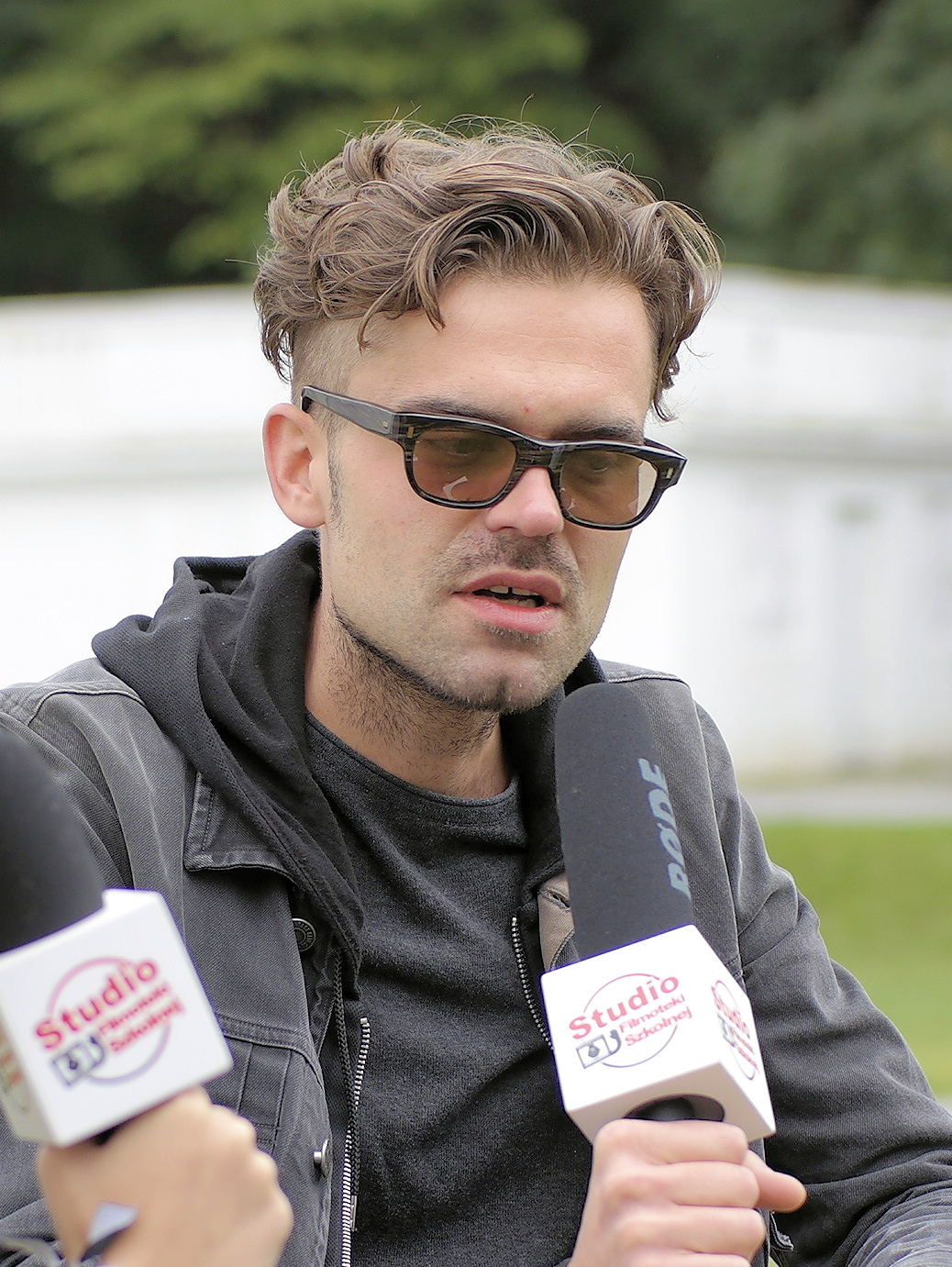
- Born: June 18, 1984 (age 42); Wrocław, Poland
- Occupations: Film director, screenwriter

Jakub Czekaj (born June 18, 1984), known professionally as Kuba Czekaj, is a Polish filmmaker.

== Education ==
In 2010, Czekaj graduated from the Krzysztof Kieślowski Faculty of Radio and Television at the University of Silesia. He later attended the Rehearsal Studio Feature Programme at Andrzej Wajda’s Master Directing School.

== Career ==
Czekaj directed a series of student films and short films throughout the late 2000s through 2010. In 2015, his feature debut Baby Bump premiered at the Venice Film Festival. His second feature, The Erlprince, debuted the following year and screened at the 2017 Berlinale.

In 2017, Czekaj was awarded the Baumi Script Development Award for his project Sorry, Poland, which also garnered the Krzysztof Kieślowski ScripTeast Award for the Best Script from Central and Eastern Europe at the 2017 Cannes Film Festival. He directed an episode of Planet Single. Eight Stories for Canal+ Poland in 2021. Two years later, he directed 3 episodes of the Netflix series Infamia and released the feature film Lipstick on the Glass.

== Filmography ==
=== Film ===
Year	Title	Notes	Ref.
2006	Piece of Heaven	Short film	
2007	Beyond the Horizon	Short film	
2009	House of Roses	Short film	
2009	Don't Be Afraid of the Dark Room	Short film	
2010	Twist & Blood	Short film	
2015	Baby Bump	—N/a	
2016	The Erlprince	—N/a	
2023	Lipstick on the Glass	—N/a	

=== Television ===
Year	Title	Notes	Ref.
2021	Planet Single. Eight Stories	Directed episode "Distance"	
2023	Infamia	Directed episodes 6, 7, and 8	

== Awards and nominations ==
Year	Award	Category	Nominated work	Result	Ref.
2015	Venice Film Festival	Queer Lion	Baby Bump	Special mention	
2016	Outfest	Artistic Vision Award	Baby Bump	Won	
2016	Gdynia Film Festival	Young Jury Award	The Erlprince	Won	
