= Jacek Bromski =

Polish film director

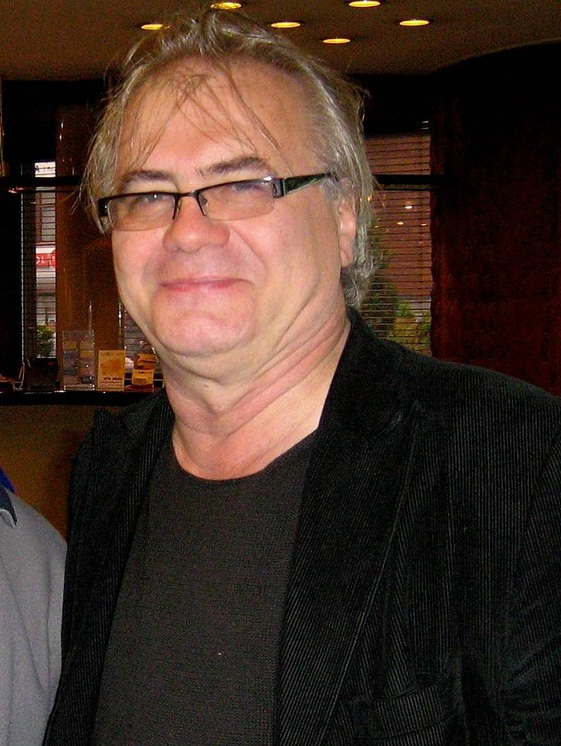
- Jacek Bromski in 2007
- Born: 19 December 1946 (age 79); Wrocław, Poland
- Occupations: Film director, screenwriter
- Years active: 1982–present

Jacek Bromski (born 19 December 1946) is a Polish film director. He has directed 15 films since 1982. He was a member of the jury at the 18th Moscow International Film Festival.

== Selected filmography ==
- Alice (1982) (co-directed with Jerzy Gruza)
- Love Stories (1997) (co-produced with Juliusz Machulski and Jacek Moczydłowski )
- U Pana Boga za piecem (1998)
- To ja, złodziej (1999)
- Career of Nikos Dyzma (2002)
- U Pana Boga w ogródku (2007)
- U Pana Boga za miedzą (2009)
- A Trip to the Moon (2013)
