= Znachor (1937 film) =

- Directed by: Michał Waszyński
- Written by: Tadeusz Dolega-Mostowicz (novel), Anatol Stern (writer)
- Starring: Kazimierz Junosza-Stępowski, Elżbieta Barszczewska
- Release date: 1937
- Running time: 100 minutes
- Country: Poland
- Languages: English; Polish

Znachor ("healer", "quack" in Polish), also known as The Miracle Man in English, is a 1937 Polish drama film directed by Michał Waszyński, an adaptation of the novel with the same name by Tadeusz Dołęga-Mostowicz published in the same year. It is followed by Profesor Wilczur (1938) and the concluding part Testament of Profesor Wilczur (1939), which was lost during World War 2.

== Cast ==
- Kazimierz Junosza-Stępowski ... Prof. Rafal Wilczur, alias Antoni Kosiba
- Elżbieta Barszczewska ... Beata Wilczurowa, wife / Maria Wilczurówna, daughter
- Witold Zacharewicz ... Leszek Czynski
- Józef Węgrzyn... Dr. Dobraniecki
- Mieczysława Ćwiklińska... Florentyna Szkopkowa
- Romuald Gierasieński ... Franek, the usher (as R. Gierasienski)
- Stanisław Grolicki ... Prokop, father
- Wlodzimierz Lozinski ... Wasyl Prokop
- Wojciech Brydzinski ... Father Czynski
- Wanda Jarszewska ... Mother Czynska
- Tadeusz Fijewski ... Dr. Pawlicki
- Marian Wyrzykowski ... Janek, lover
- Jacek Woszczerowicz ... Jemiol
- Zygmunt Biesiadecki ... The Tramp
