= Tadeusz Dołęga-Mostowicz =

Polish writer and journalist (1898–1939)

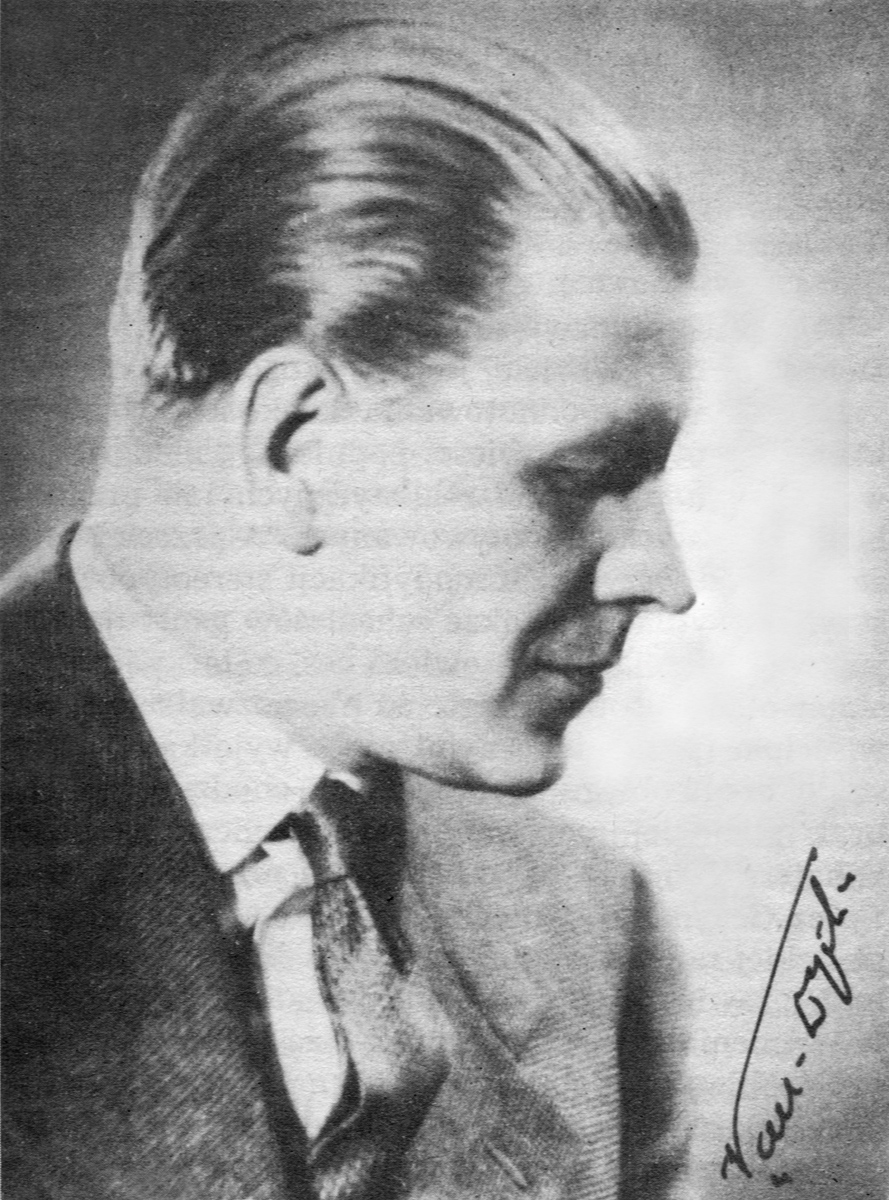
- Dołęga-Mostowicz in the 1930s
- Born: 10 August 1898; Okuniewo, Vitebsk Governorate, Russian Empire
- Died: 20 September 1939 (aged 41); Kuty (killed in battle)
- Resting place: Powązki Cemetery
- Citizenship: Second Polish Republic
- Education: University of Kiev
- Writing career
- Language: Polish

Tadeusz Dołęga-Mostowicz (pronounced [taˈdɛ.uʐ dɔˈwɛŋɡa mɔˈstɔvit͡ʂ]; 10 August 1898 – 20 September 1939) was a Polish writer, journalist and author of over a dozen popular novels. One of his best known works, which in Poland became a byword for fortuitous careerism, was The Career of Nicodemus Dyzma (Polish: Kariera Nikodema Dyzmy, 1932). Literary historians believe the book inspired the 1971 novel Being There by Jerzy Kosiński, with some charging Kosiński with plagiarism, which sparked considerable controversy in the West.

== Life and work ==
Tadeusz Mostowicz, the son of a wealthy Polish lawyer in the age of partitions, was born on 10 August 1898 at his family's village of Okuniewo near Vitebsk in the Russian Empire (now Belarus). After graduating from gimnazjum (high school) in Vilna (now Vilnius, Lithuania), then also in the Russian Empire, in 1915 Tadeusz embarked upon law studies at the University of Kiev while the First World War raged on in Central Europe. He befriended numerous fellow members of the Polish diaspora and became involved in a local underground group of the Polska Organizacja Wojskowa (Polish Military Organization, abbreviated "POW" in Polish).

After the Russian Revolution, Okuniewo was seized by Bolshevik Russia, and Mostowicz's family moved back to newly reborn Poland, where they bought a small village. Also in 1918, Tadeusz moved to Warsaw, where he joined the Polish Army. He fought as a volunteer in the Polish-Soviet War of 1919–21, and was demobilized in 1922.

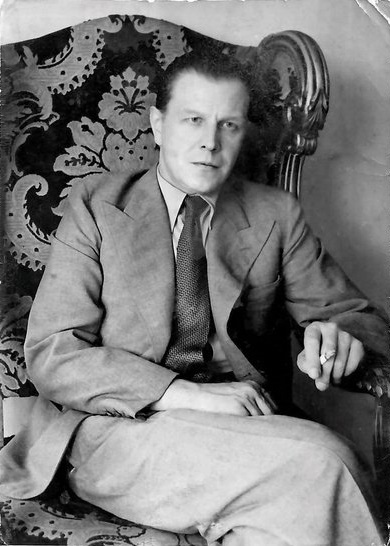
Dołęga-Mostowicz as popular novelist

While working at printing houses, Mostowicz sent short stories to newspapers and was finally discovered to be a talented reporter. From 1925 he was on the staff of the daily Rzeczpospolita (The Republic), one of the most influential newspapers in Poland. About that time he adopted the pen name "Dołęga", after his mother's Dołęga coat of arms. While a journalist, he began publishing short stories and pamphlets, many of which achieved considerable popularity.

In 1928 he quit his journalistic job and devoted himself full-time to writing fiction. The following year he finished his first novel, and in 1930 published it as Ostatnia brygada (The Last Brigade). However, it was not until 1932 that he became famous as the author of Kariera Nikodema Dyzmy (The Career of Nicodemus Dyzma), the most popular of his books. Initially serialized in newspapers, the novel proved a major success. Thereafter Mostowicz wrote an average of 2 novels a year. His monthly income is estimated to have exceeded 15,000 zlotys, some 2,800 1939 US dollars.

During the Invasion of Poland in 1939, Dołęga-Mostowicz was mobilized and served as commanding officer of an outpost defending a bridge over the Cheremosh River at the town of Kuty in southeastern Poland. On 22 September 1939, he was killed in a skirmish with the advancing Soviet Red Army. Resulting from this, most of his books were banned in Stalinist Poland after the communist takeover.

In 1978 his remains were exhumed and on 24 November interred at Warsaw's Powązki Cemetery.

== Novels ==
- Ostatnia brygada (The Last Brigade) (1930/1932)
- Kariera Nikodema Dyzmy (The Career of Nicodemus Dyzma) (1931/1932)
- Kiwony (1932/1987)
- Prokurator Alicja Horn (Prosecutor Alice Horn) (1933)
- Bracia Dalcz i S-ka (Brothers Dalcz i S-ka) (1933)
- Trzecia płeć (The Third Sex) (1934)
- Świat pani Malinowski (Mrs. Malinowska's World) (1934)
- Złota Maska (The Golden Mask) (1935)
- Wysokie Progi (1935)
- Doktor Murek zredukowany (Doctor Murek Reduced) (1936)
- Drugie życie doktora Murka (The Second Life of Doctor Murek) (1936)
- Znachor (1937)
- Ich dziecko (Their Baby) (1937)
- Trzy serca (Three Hearts) (1938)
- Profesor Wilczur (1939)
- Pamiętnik pani Hanki (Mrs. Hanka's Diary) (1939)

== Film adaptations ==
Most of his novels have been filmed:

Novel	Film
Ostatnia brygada (1930/1932)	Ostatnia brygada (1938)
Kariera Nikodema Dyzmy (1932)	Nikodem Dyzma (1956); Kariera Nikodema Dyzmy (1980) TV miniseries
Prokurator Alicja Horn (1933)	Prokurator Alicja Horn (1933)
Złota Maska and Wysokie Progi (1935)	Złota Maska (1939, released in 1940 due to World War II)
Doktor Murek zredukowany and Drugie życie doktora Murka (1936)	Doktór Murek (1939); Doktor Murek (1979) TV miniseries
Znachor (1937)	Znachor (1937); The Quack (1982); Forgotten Love (2023)
Trzy serca (1938)	The Three Hearts (1939)
Profesor Wilczur (1939)	Profesor Wilczur (1938)
Pamiętnik pani Hanki (1939)	Pamiętnik pani Hanki (1963)
Polish film Testament profesora Wilczura was a spin-off (shot in 1939, released in 1942 during occupation of Poland in World War II); is now a lost film which continued the story of one of the supporting characters from Znachor and Profesor Wilczur. The plot twist from Kariera Nikodema Dyzmy was rehashed in Kariera Nikosia Dyzmy (2002).

== See also ==
- Politics in fiction
- List of Poles
