= 1936 in Poland =

- Decades: 1910s; 1920s; 1930s; 1940s; 1950s
- See also: Other events of 1936; Timeline of Polish history

== Incumbents ==
On May 15, 1936, president of Poland Ignacy Mościcki designed the government under prime minister Felicjan Sławoj Składkowski, who replaced Marian Zyndram-Kościałkowski. The government was dissolved on September 30, 1939. This was the last government of the Second Polish Republic which resided in Warsaw.

=== Members of the government ===
- President of Poland - Ignacy Mościcki,
- Prime Minister - Marian Zyndram-Kościałkowski (until May 15, 1936), Felicjan Sławoj Składkowski (since May 15, 1936),
- Deputy Prime Minister and Minister of Treasury - Eugeniusz Kwiatkowski,
- Minister of Foreign Affairs - Józef Beck,
- Minister of Justice - Czesław Michałowski (until May 16, 1936), Witold Grabowski (since May 16, 1936),
- Minister of Military Affairs - Tadeusz Kasprzycki,
- Minister of Agriculture - Juliusz Poniatowski,
- Minister of Communication - Juliusz Ulrych,
- Minister of Post Office and Telegraphs - Emil Kaliński,
- Minister of Religious Beliefs and Public Enlightenment - Wojciech Świętosławski,
- Minister of Industry and Trade - Roman Górecki (until May 15, 1936), Antoni Roman (since May 15, 1936).

=== Other personalities ===
- Primate of Poland - August Hlond,
- Eastern Orthodox Church Archbishop of Warsaw - Dionizy (Dionisij, real name Konstantyn Waledynski),
- Chief Rabbi of Warsaw - vacant,
- Marshall of the Sejm - Stanislaw Car,
- Marshall of the Senat - Aleksander Prystor.

== Events ==
=== January ===
- January 2. The Sejm declares partial amnesty,
- January 4. Janusz Sent, a composer and pianist, author of several popular songs, is born in Świętochłowice,
- January 5. New studio of Radio Kraków is opened,
- January 7. Actress Anna Ciepielewska is born in Ostróg nad Horyniem,
- January 11. Actor Marian Kociniak is born in Warsaw,
- January 13. Court trial of the assassins of Minister Bronisław Pieracki ends in Warsaw. Three Ukrainian nationalists, including Stepan Bandera, are sentenced to death, two others are sentenced to life imprisonment,
- January 14. President of Poland issues a decree of protection of the interests of the Polish State and its citizens,
- January 17. Film director Ryszard Bolesławski dies in Hollywood,
- January 20. Actress Barbara Rylska is born in Warsaw,
- January 23. Premiere of the film Dodek na froncie,
- January 28. Polish TV personality Edyta Wojtczak is born in Grójec,

=== February ===
- February 2. In a friendly football game in Brussels, Poland beats Belgium 2-0, with goals scored by Ryszard Piec and Hubert Gad,
- February 14. Singer Anna German is born in Uzbekistan,
- February 16. The so-called Front Morges, a political alliance of centrist parties is formed in Ignacy Paderewski's villa, located in Morges, Switzerland. Apart from Paderewski, the alliance is formed by General Józef Haller, General Władysław Sikorski and Wincenty Witos,
- February 24. Actor Władysław Kowalski is born in the village of Żurawce near Tomaszów Lubelski,
- February 25. Actor Wiesław Dymny is born near Nowogródek,
- February 27. Pan Twardowski (1936 film) premiers in Warsaw,

=== March ===
- March 2–8. Strike action at Polish-Swiss Chocolate Factory Philippe Suchard in Kraków,
- March 8. Actor Janusz Zakrzeński is born near Kielce,
- March 9. Przytyk pogrom takes place in the town of Przytyk,
- March 12. Michał Heller is born in Tarnów,
- March 15. Kasprowy Wierch Cable Car is completed,
- March 18–21. Strike action at Polish Rubber Factory Semperit in Kraków,
- March 22. Strike action at Coal Mine Silesia in Chropaczów,
- March 23. Ten people are killed and over forty are wounded in violent street clashes between protesting workers and police in Kraków,
- March 26. Street clashes in Częstochowa, in which the police kill one person,
- March 27. Jazz musician Jan Ptaszyn Wróblewski is born in Kalisz,

=== April ===
- April 2. Street protests across Poland against the Kraków Massacre of March 23,
- April 9. Following a decree of President Ignacy Mościcki, Fundusz Obrony Narodowej is created,
- April 16. Bloody Thursday in Lwów. A funeral of an unemployed worker Władysław Kozak, killed by the police two days before, turns into a violent riot, in which up to 49 people are killed,
- April 19. Jan Kiliński Monument is unveiled in Warsaw,
- April 21. MS Batory sets on her first route, from the shipyard of Cantieri Riuniti dell'Adriatico in Monfalcone to Gdynia,
- April 23. Ten protesters are killed by the police in Kraków,

=== May ===
- May 11. MS Batory anchors at Gdynia,
- May 12. At the Rasos Cemetery in Wilno, ashes and heart of Maria Piłsudska, the mother of Józef Piłsudski, are buried. Committee of the Defence of the Republic (Komitet Obrony Rzeczypospolitej) is founded in Warsaw,
- May 15. General Felicjan Sławoj Składkowski becomes Prime Minister and Minister of Internal Affairs. He remains in these posts until September 1939,
- May 16–17. Left-wing intellectuals gather to participate in the Lwów Anti-Fascist Congress of Cultural Workers.

=== June ===
- June 1. Violent riots between Poles and Jews in Mińsk Mazowiecki. The riots start when a local Jew, Judka Lejba Chaskielewicz kills a police officer, Jan Bujak,
- June 6. Actor Roman Wilhelmi is born in Poznań,
- June 9. Street clashes in Gdynia, with one worker killed and 9 wounded,
- June 22. Myślenice Raid, carried out by Adam Doboszyński, of the National Party,
- June 24. Film director Andrzej Kostenko is born in Łódź,
- June 29. A peasant rally in Nowosielce,

=== July ===
- July 15. Prime Minister Sławoj Składkowski issues a decree stating that General Edward Rydz-Śmigły is the second most important person in the country. Boxer Tadeusz Walasek is born near Łomża,
- July 16. General Gustaw Orlicz-Dreszer dies in a plane crash over the Baltic Sea near Gdynia,
- July 17. Singer Danuta Rinn is born in Kraków,
- July 20. Film director Andrzej Kondratiuk is born in Pińsk,

=== August ===
- August 3. General Józef Sowiński Park is opened in Warsaw, upon initiative of Stefan Starzyński,
- August 5. In Berlin, in the Summer Olympics, Poland beats Hungary, 3-0 (two goals by Hubert Gad and one by Gerard Wodarz),
- August 8. In Berlin, in the Summer Olympics, Poland beats Great Britain, 5-4 (three goals by Gerard Wodarz, one by Hubert Gad and one by Ryszard Piec),
- August 11. In the Summer Olympics semifinal, Poland loses to Austria, 1-2 (goal by Hubert Gad),
- August 13. In the Summer Olympics third place match, Poland loses to Norway, 2-3 (goals by Gerard Wodarz and Teodor Peterek),
- August 21. President Ignacy Mościcki officially creates Hel Fortified Area,

=== September ===
- September 6. Polish-French agreement in Rambouillet, where French government agrees for a loan for the Polish Army. In a friendly football game in Riga, Poland ties with Latvia, 3-3 (goals by Jerzy Wostal, Michał Matyas and Hieronim Schwartz). In a friendly football game in Belgrade, Poland loses to Yugoslavia, 3-9 (two goals by Teodor Peterek, one by Gerard Wodarz),
- September 13. In a friendly football game in Warsaw, Poland ties with Germany, 1-1 (goal by Gerard Wodarz),
- September 20. First Congress of Ukrainian Front of National Unity takes place in Lwów,

=== October ===
- October 1. ORP Błyskawica is launched at East Cowes,
- October 4. Release of Wierna rzeka (1936 film). In a friendly football game in Copenhagen, Poland loses to Denmark, 1-2 (goal by Hubert Gad),
- October 9. Poet Agnieszka Osiecka is born in Warsaw,
- October 30. Painter Ferdynand Ruszczyc dies near Nowogródek,
- October 31. Politician Ignacy Daszyński dies in Bystra near Cieszyn. Marceli Nowotko is sentenced to 12 years for communist activity,

=== November ===
- November 3. Premiere of first Polish Radio drama, "Everyday Life of the Kowalskis" ("Dni powszednie państwa Kowalskich"), by Maria Kuncewiczowa,
- November 11. General Edward Rydz-Śmigły is named Marshal of Poland,
- November 19. Premiere of Konrad Tom's film Ada! To nie wypada! (Ada, Don't Do That!),
- November 29. ORP Gryf is launched at Le Havre,

=== December ===
- December 7. Premiere of Barbara Radziwiłłówna (film),
- The government announces that all citizens of Poland who participate in Spanish Civil War will be deprived of their citizenship,
- December 13. First flight of the prototype of PZL.37 Łoś. Opening of the Porąbka Dam on the Soła river,
- December 15. Opening of the first Polish electrified rail connection between Warsaw, Otwock, and Pruszków,
- December 24. Archbishop Filippo Cortesi is appointed the Apostolic Nuncio to Poland,

== Sources ==
- Ilustrowany Kurjer Codzienny in digital version
