= 1937 in Poland =

- Decades: 1910s; 1920s; 1930s; 1940s; 1950s
- See also: Other events of 1937; Timeline of Polish history

== Incumbents ==
On May 15, 1936, president of Poland Ignacy Mościcki designed the government under prime minister Felicjan Sławoj Składkowski. The government was dissolved on September 30, 1939. This was the last government of the Second Polish Republic which resided in Warsaw.

=== Members of the government ===
- President of Poland - Ignacy Mościcki,
- Prime Minister - Felicjan Sławoj Składkowski,
- Deputy Prime Minister and Minister of Treasury - Eugeniusz Kwiatkowski,
- Minister of Foreign Affairs - Józef Beck,
- Minister of Justice - Witold Grabowski,
- Minister of Military Affairs - Tadeusz Kasprzycki,
- Minister of Agriculture - Juliusz Poniatowski,
- Minister of Communication - Juliusz Ulrych
- Minister of Industry and Trade - Antoni Roman.

=== Other personalities ===
- Primate of Poland - August Hlond,
- Eastern Orthodox Church Archbishop of Warsaw - Dionizy (Dionisij, real name Konstantyn Waledynski),
- Chief Rabbi of Warsaw - vacant,
- Marshall of the Sejm - Stanislaw Car,
- Marshall of the Senat - Aleksander Prystor.

== Events ==
=== January ===
- January 1. President Ignacy Mościcki meets foreign diplomats, accredited in Warsaw. The traditional new year's meeting takes place at the Royal Castle in Warsaw. On the same day, French Senate votes in favour of a financial loan for Poland,
- January 2. French loan is accepted by the budget commission of the Sejm,
- January 3. Polish press writes about a projected new Polish-German agreement, regarding rail and road transit from Germany proper to East Prussia, through the so-called Polish Corridor. A "Salus" tannery burns to the ground in Rybnik,
- January 4. After a series of riots, classes at all Warsaw colleges are resumed. Congress of Association of German Teachers in Poland begins in Łódź,
- January 5. In his Sejm expose, Józef Beck emphasizes the importance of the Polish-French Alliance,
- January 6. A massive street rally in Lwów, supporting the rights of the Polish community of the Free City of Danzig,
- January 7. A massive brawl between Poles and Jews takes place at Czyżew, during a village fair,
- January 9. Juliana of the Netherlands comes by train to Krynica-Zdrój via Kraków, together with husband Prince Bernhard of Lippe-Biesterfeld,
- January 10: two paved highways are opened by the Minister of Communication: Kraków - Wieliczka (12 km) and Kraków - Katowice (64 km). Warsaw police arrest 13 activists of National Radical Camp (1934),
- January 11. Major Nicolas Baiculescu, the new Romanian military attache, comes to Warsaw. Left-leaning political party Stronnictwo Chłopskie is outlawed for its pro-Communist and anti-government stance. Marshall Edward Rydz-Śmigły comes to Zakopane for winter vacation,
- January 13. The University of Wilno is closed after a series of brawls between its Polish and Jewish students,
- January 14. A dinner for foreign diplomats accredited in Poland takes place in Warsaw,
- January 15. Construction of Polish Radio Baranowicze station is announced by the press. Polish and German rail officials meet in Lwów to discuss transit through the Polish Corridor. Eight people die and 42 are injured in a rail crash in Mysłowice,
- January 17: the People's Party votes in favour of a general peasant strike (see 1937 peasant strike in Poland),
- January 19. During a meeting of the City Council of Łódź, riots break down between members of the right and left-wing parties. One day strike actions take place at the universities in Poznań and Lwów,
- January 20. Minister Józef Beck meets Konstantin von Neurath in Berlin, along the way to Geneva for a session of the League of Nations. Three Polish fishing cutters are lost on the Baltic Sea,
- January 21: the premiere of the film “Pani Minister Tanczy” (“Miss Minister Dances”), directed by Juliusz Gardan. On the same day, composer Zbigniew Bargielski is born in Łomża,
- January 22. Poland celebrates the 74th anniversary of the January Uprising,
- January 23. Street fights between the unemployed and the police take place at Radziejów, with the mayor of the town beaten up by the mob. Rail line Toruń - Sierpc is officially opened,
- January 24. Anti-Communist rallies of Christian labor unions take place in 30 main cities of Poland. Poet Kazimierz Wierzyński receives the National Literary Award from President Ignacy Mościcki
- January 28: anti-Semitic riots at University of Warsaw and Warsaw University of Technology,
- January 29. Dutch royal couple comes to Zakopane,
- January 31 – February 2: The 25th Congress of the Polish Socialist Party takes place in Radom. Four people die in a rail crash near Mikołów,

=== February ===
- February 1. Massive snowstorms paralyze communication of southern Poland, especially in northern Lesser Poland (Lublin, Kielce), and Volhynia,
- February 3. According to the statistics, there are 94,000 radio sets in Warsaw, 32,000 in v, and 28,000 in Lwów,
- February 5: Polish government announces creation of the Central Industrial Region,
- February 10. Plans for the construction of a rail line from Wilno to Lwow, via Slonim, Kamien Koszyrski and Kowel, are presented in Polish media,
- February 14. Marshal Edward Smigly-Rydz becomes an honorary member of Polish YMCA. Polish-Jewish riots take place at Wysokie Mazowieckie,
- February 15. Former Prime Minister Kazimierz Bartel and the Lwow Polytechnic are awarded the Polonia Restituta,
- February 16. Prussian Prime Minister Hermann Göring meets top Polish officials in Warsaw,
- February 21: Camp of National Unity is founded. On the same day, 3rd International Chopin Piano Competition begins in Warsaw (the winner was Yakov Zak),

=== March ===
- March 1: Warsaw I station of the Polskie Radio (Polish Radio) is opened (see Radio stations in interwar Poland),
- March 12. The Minister of Military Affairs orders creation of units of the National Defense,
- March 20: construction of the town and steel mill Stalowa Wola begins. On the same day, the premiere of the film “Ordynat Michorowski” (“Count Michorowski”) takes place,
- March 31. Minister of Internal Affairs dissolves City Council of Łódź, dominated by left-wing activists.

=== April ===
- April 2. President Ignacy Mościcki posthumously awards Order of Polonia Restituta to pianist Karol Szymanowski,
- April 7. Karol Szymanowski is buried at the Skalka Cemetery in Kraków,
- April 9. General strike action in Łódź, against the dissolution of its City Council,
- April 18. During the commemoration of the anniversary of the Battle of Racławice, the police kill 3 participants, wounding several others,
- April 20. The premiere of the film “Dorozkaz nr 13” (“Cab Driver nr. 13”),
- April 23. The Sejm declares November 11 as the National Independence Day,

=== May ===
- May 13. Street riots at Brzesc nad Bugiem after police officer Stefan Kedziora is killed by a local Jew, Welwel Szczebowski,
- May 26. The government dissolves the League of Defence of Human and Citizen Rights, which had defended political prisoners.

=== June ===
- June 1. Coat of arms of the City of Kraków is officially established,
- June 20. Bishop Adam Stefan Sapieha confirms his plan to move the body of Józef Piłsudski to a crypt located under the Silver Bell Tower of the Wawel,
- June 22. Association of Young Poland, a youth movement of the Camp of National Unity is founded,

=== July ===
- July 9. Construction of Piłsudski's Mound is completed in Kraków,

=== August ===
- August 1. The first regular bus service is established at Sosnowiec.
- August 15. 1937 peasant strike in Poland begins,
- August 19. Police kill two peasants, blocking the road at the village in Harta,
- August 25. Peasant strike ends, with 15 peasants killed by the police in the village of Majdan Sieniawski,

=== September ===
- September 4. Rectors of several colleges introduce the so-called Ghetto benches,
- September 16. The premiere of the film Znachor,

=== October ===
- October 2. The Association of Patriotic Left is founded,
- October 3. The Association of Polish Trade Unions is founded,
- October 5. Polish-German Agreement on Transit via the Polish Corridor is signed,
- October 10. Labor Party is founded, with Wojciech Korfanty as its leader,
- October 18. The Democratic Club, later renamed into Alliance of Democrats is founded,
- October 19. Council of Physicians of the Polish State introduces the so-called Aryan paragraph,
- October 26. Premiere of the film “Dziewczeta z Nowolipek” (“Girls of Nowolipki”). On the same day, General Józef Dowbor-Muśnicki dies in Batorowo near Poznań,
- October 27. The new pattern of vehicle licence plates is introduced,

=== November ===
- November 11. The first celebration of Polish Independence Day,
- November 25. First raising of the flag of ORP Błyskawica,
- November 27. Council of Ministers reactivates Legia Akademicka (Academic Legion), a paramilitary organization of student volunteers,

=== December ===
- December 8. First Polish funicular is opened in Krynica-Zdrój,
- December 15. The rail connection between Warsaw and Mińsk Mazowiecki is electrified,
- December 22. Socialist Labor Party is dissolved.

== Sports ==
=== January ===
- January 1. In a friendly game at Stuttgart, Ruch Chorzów beats VfB Stuttgart 3-1. All three goals for the Polish football champions are scored by Ernst Wilimowski,
- January 3. In a friendly game in Chorzów, football team of AKS Chorzów beats 5-0 the champion of Latvia, Olimpija Liepāja,
- January 4. Women's Volleyball Championships of Poland begin in Łódź, with eight teams: Polonia Warszawa, AZS Lwów, HKS Łódź, Olsza Kraków, Gryf Toruń, Unia Lublin, Warta Poznań and AZS Warszawa. The tournament is won by HKS Łódź,
- January 7. In Poznań, Polish boxing team beats 12-4 Norway,
- January 15. Men's Volleyball Championships of Poland begin in Warsaw, with ten teams: AZS Warsaw, Sokol Piotrkow Trybunalski, WKS Łódź, YMCA Kraków, Jednosc Ostrow Wielkopolski, Polonia Warszawa, KPW Katowice, Gryf Toruń, Sokol II Lwów, Ognisko Wilno. The tournament is won by Polonia Warszawa,
- January 16. Table Tennis Championships of Poland begin in Tarnów. Skiing Championships of Poland begin in Wisła.

=== February ===
- February 2. Ice-hockey championship of Poland begins in Krynica, with six teams (AZS Warszawa, KTH Krynica, Cracovia, Czarni Lwów, Warszawianka, AZS Poznań),

== February ==
- February 14: first competition takes place at a new ski jumping hill at Skalité near Szczyrk,

== New books ==
- Ferdydurke, by Witold Gombrowicz,
- Satan from the 7th Grade, by Kornel Makuszyński,
- Merry Devil's Friend, by Kornel Makuszyński,
- About the Wawel Dragon, by Kornel Makuszyński,
- The Lover of Ursa Major, by Sergiusz Piasecki,
- Sanatorium Under the Sign of the Hourglass, by Bruno Schulz.

== Births ==
- January 1 – Adam Wiśniewski-Snerg, science fiction writer (d. 1995)
- January 3 – Zygmunt Konieczny, composer
- January 12 – Marian Sawa, composer (d. 2005)
- February 6 – Wiesław Ochman, opera singer
- August 18 – Edward Stachura, poet and writer (d. 1979)
- November 22 – Edward Hulewicz, musician (d. 2022)
- November 27 – Cezary Kuleszyński, hurdler (d. 2011)
- December 26 – Teresa Kubiak, opera singer

== Deaths ==
- January 31 – Alfons Zgrzebniok, activist (b. 1981)
- February 23 – Henryk Rossman, political activist (b. 1896)
- March 29 – Karol Szymanowski, composer (b. 1882)
- August 21 – Adolf Warski, communist activist (b. 1868)
- November 5 – Bolesław Leśmian, poet (b. 1877)
- December 9 – Andrzej Strug, writer
- Władysław Natanson, physicist (b. 1864)

== Sources ==
- Ilustrowany Kurjer Codzienny in digital version
