= Ulrych =

Ulrych is a surname. Notable people with the surname include:

- Juliusz Ulrych (1888–1959), Polish soldier
- Petr Ulrych (born 1944), Czech musician
- Petr Ulrych (ice hockey) (born 1987), Czech ice hockey player
