= Strike of the generals =

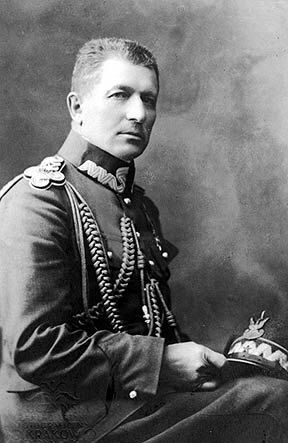
Franciszek Latinik

The strike of the generals was a joint resignation of a group of high commanders of the Polish Army in October 1924.

A group of officers, who were previously members of the Polish Legions in World War I, submitted resignation from duty as a response to the statement of General Franciszek Latinik, commander of Corps District No. X., garrison of Przemyśl. The resigning officers, that included Major General Edward Śmigły-Rydz, Lieutenant General Gustaw Orlicz-Dreszer, Lieutenant General Roman Górecki, Lieutenant General Jakub Krzemieński, Lieutenant General Aleksander Litwinowicz, Colonel Felicjan Sławoj Składkowski and Lieutenant Colonel Stefan Dąbkowski, considered Latinik's unfavorable comments on the former Legions' members a source of personal insult and demanded a firm reaction of the state authorities to these comments. The events gained high publicity, being widely discussed in both Polish and international press. Request of the group that made a collective resignation was rejected; the crisis eventually contributed to the resignation of Latinik himself. On February 28, 1925, at the age of sixty, at his own request, he left the active service.

== Background ==
Franciszek Latinik gained experience serving until 1918 in the Austro-Hungarian Army (as Poland did not exist as an independent state), and participated as a colonel in the fights of World War I. After entering Polish Army, he did not show sympathy to former soldiers of Polish Legions. Having been educated in an elite Academy of the General Staff in Vienna, Latinik considered Legions members incompetent and did not respect their military qualifications. Politically, he sympathized with National Democracy. According to Jerzy Rawicz, in 1919, when commanding Polish forces defending the Czech offensive in Cieszyn Silesia, Latinik has entered into a dispute with some representatives of leftist circles, among others Dorota Kłuszyńska, social activist and feminist who later became a Member of the Senate from PPS list.

The first incident pointing to Latinik's reluctance to former members of the Legions took place in the spring of 1921. At the time, Latinik was already appointed lieutenant general and was a commander of the General District Kielce. In July 1921 Major Marian Prosołowicz lodged a complaint with Latinik to the Ministry of Military Affairs, stating that his superior "offended legionaries as such." In his testimony, Porosłowicz recalled the words of Latinik:

You (I understood: legionaries) always deal with everything privately, I prefer to serve with dishwashers than with such army.

However, in the opinion of other witnesses, there was no basis to recognize these words as referring generally to the legionnaires as a group. The then Minister of Military Affairs Józef Leśniewski dismissed the complaint of Prosołowicz, stating that Latinik's statement was "offensive but not political". In the situation given, Minister Leśniewski had demanded that Latinik summoned Major Porosłowicz to the report and informed him about the minister's decision, demanding from Latinik also to state "that he considered the words addressed to Major Prosołowicz on May 23rd to be uttered in exaltation and he did not intend to punish his younger colleague".

From October 1921, Latinik was the commander of Corps District No. X. in Przemyśl. Residing in Przemyśl was unprofitable for him; he previously counted on transferring to the city with an academic center due to the possibility of providing higher education to his daughters. Chief of State Józef Piłsudski had a negative attitude to the activity of Latinik in Przemyśl. As Latinik described in a later report, after the assassination of President Gabriel Narutowicz on December 16, 1922, he was ordered to report to Piłsudski:

At 7 p.m. the Marshal received me and when he finished his speech on politics in the military, illegal organizations, etc. I asked:
– Sir, how does that apply to me?

Piłsudski answered:

It applies to you particularly, because you are the organizer of fascism in your district.

The basis for the indictment was a report of a secret meeting at Latinik's house that took place a few days before the attack on President Narutowicz. The election of Narutowicz less than two weeks earlier was followed by several protests and strong negative propaganda from the anti-Semitic right-wing; some historians argue that these actions led, in the climax, to the murder of Narutowicz. Latinik strongly denied the allegations, declaring that "the reporter must either have been mentally ill or a malicious calumniator". For the meeting mentioned in the report Latinik invited, among others, Bishop of Przemyśl Józef Pelczar and the Starost of Przemyśl District. It was to take place in November and deal with the increasing acts of sabotage in Przemyśl and propose forms of self-help organizations. As Piłsudski remained unconvinced by these explanations, Latinik was to present a printed report of the meeting to the Marshal later on.

== Cause and course of the strike ==
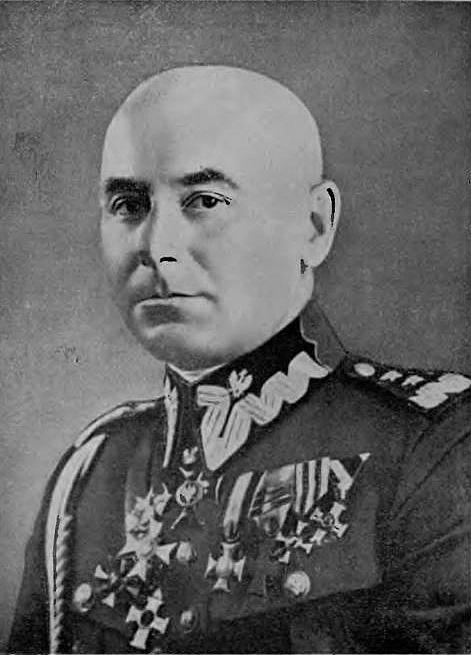
Edward Śmigły-Rydz

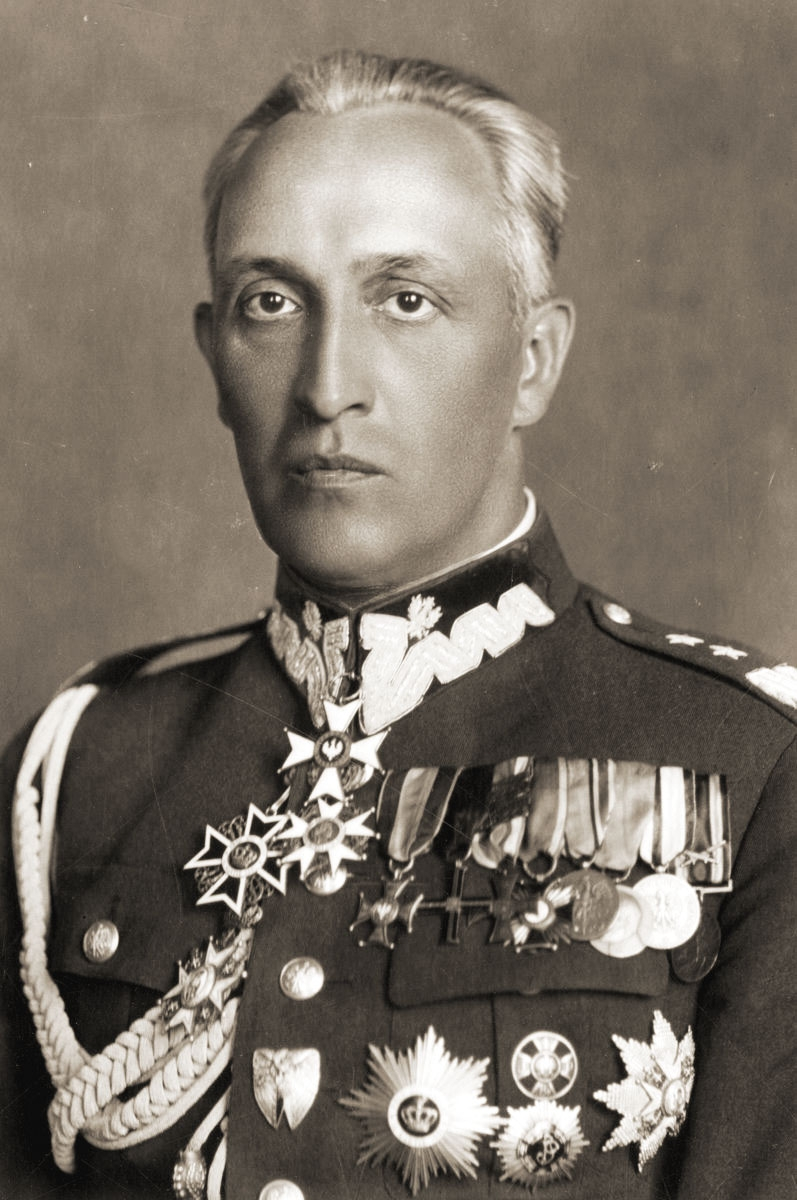
Gustaw Orlicz-Dreszer

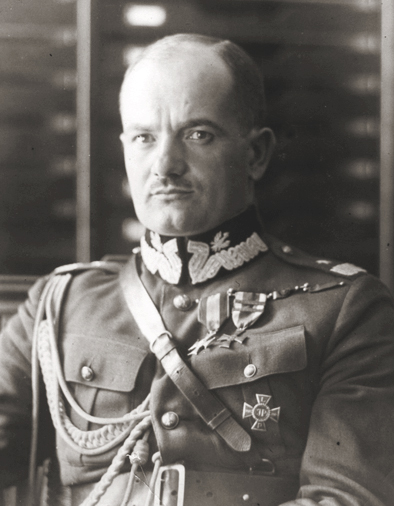
Roman Górecki

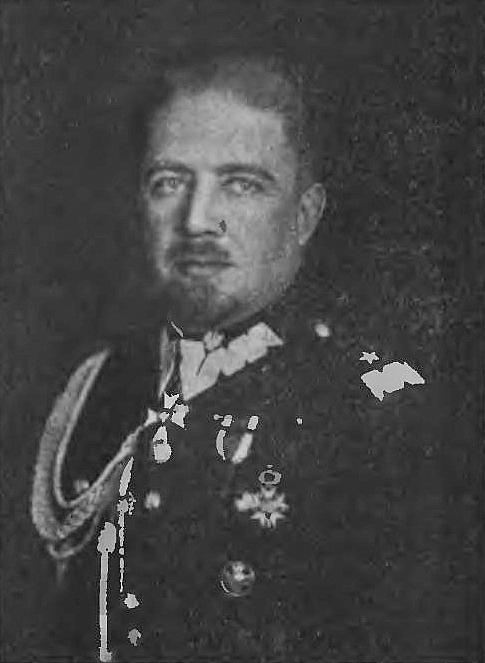
Jakub Krzemieński

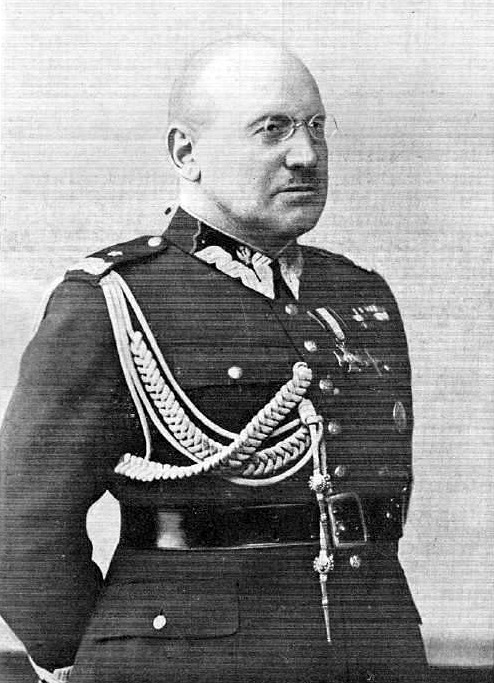
Aleksander Litwinowicz

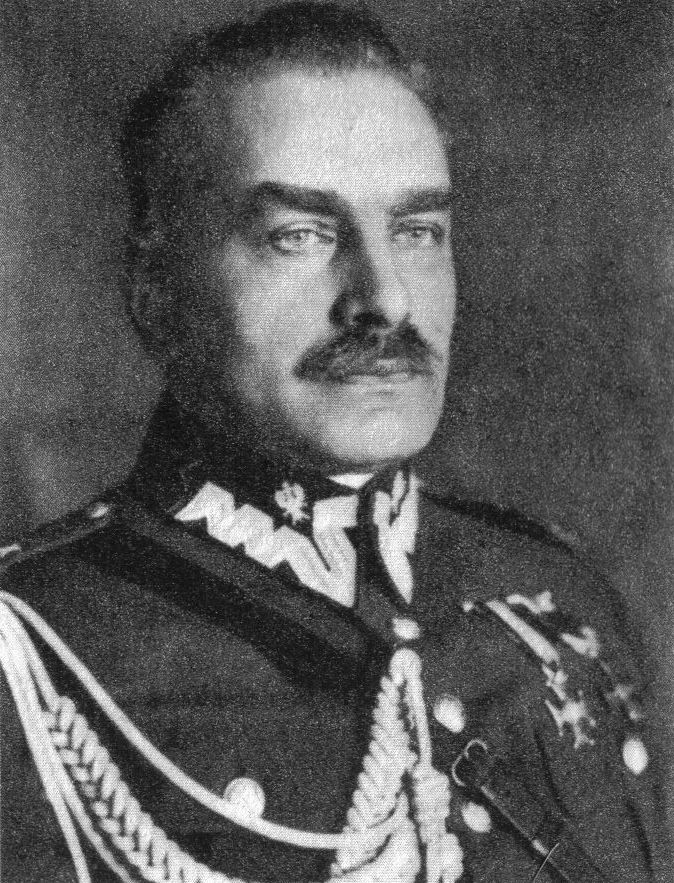
Felicjan Sławoj Składkowski

Officers of the Polish Army that resigned from active service in the fall of 1924. Their resignation, however, was not accepted.

In the late summer of 1924 in many Polish cities former Legion soldiers who still actively served in the Polish Army began preparations to the events celebrating the tenth anniversary of the set out of the First Cadre Company from Kraków. The anniversary date was August 6. The main celebrations took place on August 9–11 in Lublin; the local celebrations in Przemyśl took place on Sunday, September 7, 1924. On the same day, General Latinik together with his deputy, General Wiktor Jarosz, took part in the welcome of President Stanisław Wojciechowski, who stopped in Przemyśl on the way from Lviv to Warsaw. The Honorary Company and the Military Orchestra also attended the Presidential Welcome Ceremony at the railway station.

Before that, at the end of July, a delegation with publisher Józef Styfi, foreman Zajączkowski, H. Stieberow and Professor B. Groch came to Latinik to ask the Army help in organizing the anniversary and the participation of the 38th Infantry Regiment in the march of former legionaries through the city. Latinik turned to the applicants with the following response:

Today you are coming with the Legionary celebrations, tomorrow the Jews will come with Jericho, and the day after the Ukrainians with Petlura...

On the legionaries themselves he said:

Those who were worthy died, those who live are worthless.

On the following day the incident was a subject of an article in a local paper Nowy Głos Przemyski (New Voice of Przemyśl), which condemned General Latinik for his demeanor. Latinik ordered to confiscate the issue; the case went to a court which ruled in October that the confiscation was unfounded and abolished it. The subject of Latinik's unfavorable attitude to the legionaries was, however, taken up by other papers, some of which undermined the sense of Polish national identity of Latinik before 1918, i.e. before regaining independence by Poland.

We will not judge here the value of General Latinik as a General, a man and for five years already a Pole (...)

Although the General has been for at least five years in the service of the Polish army, he still seems to be an Austrian Colonel and seems to think that Polish people are constantly one of the fourteen nationalities of the Austro-Hungarian Monarchy.

The editorial office of Ziemia Przemyska (Land of Przemyśl), on the contrary, stood strongly in defense of Latinik. The attack on him was described as "a revenge for an unsuccessful show in honor of former Chief Piłsudski and the Legions in Przemyśl".

The military did not participate in the ceremony; neither did – as it is well known – the society, except for a few handful of supporters of the former head of state. The consequence of this flap was that the anger towards everyone and everything was unloaded in a very primitive way in the Głos, which was twice seized because of articles degrading military authorities. Obviously, as the delegation did not fail to make a report of every hint of the General to Głos, then Głos sought out again the offended, and they caused a scandal, which epilogue was the resignation of General Latinik.

On October 30, a group of MPs from the Polish People's Party "Wyzwolenie" and the "Unity of People", headed by Bogusław Miedziński, submitted an interpellation in which they described the events that took place in Przemyśl and asked Władysław Sikorski, the Minister of Military Affairs, "a living legionary officer", if he "got acquainted with the case" and if "he has responded to the insane and criminal prank of General Latinik so that the punishment that he was to receive secured future relations in the army and offended part of the army from this kind of provocation."

Sikorski did not answer. He could not downplay Latinik's words, after numerous press publications and the submitted interpellation, but it is also possible that he did not want to advocate on the side opposite to the General. Shortly after that the Ministry of Military Affairs started to receive individual complaints of soldiers that were personally offended by the statements of Latinik and demanded "protection of the honor of the uniform". Complaints and appeals on this subject were submitted, among others, by Leon Berbecki, Władysław Jaxa-Rożen and Mariusz Zaruski.

Because of Sikorski's absence in Warsaw, General Edward Śmigły-Rydz turned to the Deputy Minister of Military Affairs, Stefan Majewski, with the request of intervention and punishment of Latinik. Majewski refused, as he didn't want to make controversial decisions for his superior, General Sikorski. Then, a group of generals and senior officers, who previously served in the Polish Legions, have resigned from active service to protest against the passive attitude of the Ministry. Following officers formed the group:

- Major General Edward Śmigły-Rydz, Inspector of the Army No. 1 in Vilnius;
- Lieutenant General Gustaw Orlicz-Dreszer, commander of the 2nd Cavalry Division in Warsaw;
- Lieutenant General Roman Górecki, head of the Corps of Controllers in Warsaw;
- Lieutenant General Jakub Krzemieński, the judge of the Supreme Military Court in Warsaw;
- Lieutenant General Aleksander Litwinowicz, head of the Department of Military Industry of the Ministry of Military Affairs in Warsaw,
- Colonel Felicjan Sławoj Składkowski, head of the Department of the VIIIth Department of Sanitary Ministry of Military Affairs in Warsaw;
- Lieutenant Colonel Stefan Dąbkowski, commander of the 10th Engineer Regiment in Przemyśl.

== Aftermath ==
The submission of the resignation was a subject of several press articles and polemics; it was widely discussed in the national press; some foreign newspapers also took notice of the incident. French L'Illustration was the first to use the term "strike" in reference to the events that occurred. Shortly after that the term began to function in Poland as well.

Right-wing publicists pointed to a weak sense of military duty of these, who have resigned. As the author of an article in Dwugroszówka remarked, "they are ready to take off their grinds for whatever reason". The commenter went on, adding ironically:

On the resignation of General Rydz-Śmigły, the art of painting may be gaining. The military profession surely won't be losing anything. (Note: After passing high school exams Rydz-Śmigły for some time studied painting at the Jan Matejko Academy of Fine Arts, taking lessons from Leon Wyczółkowski and Teodor Axentowicz.)

Stanisław Mackiewicz judged that strike participants "submitted evidence of military immaturity". Latinik, in turn, was attacked by Wojciech Stpiczyński, activist and radical supporter of Józef Piłsudski. Stpiczyński also criticized other officers whose roots were in the Austro-Hungarian Army:

All the Czikiels, Redls, Latiniks and Hofrichters have come from one school of hypocrisy and lies, bent necks, school of fawing and toadying."

As the absence of Minister Sikorski in Warsaw prolonged, Deputy Minister Majewski declined to make the final decision himself. Instead, he ordered to the court of honor to settle the case. On October 31, 1924, he appointed General Eugeniusz Pogorzelski to investigate the justification of allegations made to Latinik; as Deputy Minister summarized:

General Pogorzelski will immediately leave for this purpose to Przemyśl and upon return he will submit to me a comprehensive report.

Then, on November 3, Latinik was summoned by the Deputy Minister to Warsaw. In the subsequent report, two applications were made: firstly, that Latinik should leave at his own request from the army, and secondly, that the case should be handed over to the general honorary court.

On November 4, 1924 Polska Zbrojna has published a statement from the Cabinet of the Minister of Military Affairs, which claimed that:

- due to the late notification of the prosecutor's office, Latinik's legal proceedings and prosecution, as well as disciplinary proceedings, were time-barred,
- Lieutenant General Stefan Majewski, as the Deputy Minister acting on the behalf of the Minister of Military Affairs, provided materials for the case to be considered by the honorary court for the generals,
- General Latinik made a request to transfer him to permanent rest and was granted leave on November 3.

On Thursday, November 6, 1924, Deputy Minister Majewski on the behalf of Minister Sikorski ordered the limitation of military orchestras' performances due to "too much overload in some of the larger garrisons of the orchestra's performance, impeding their rational training".

Latinik applied for release from active service and said that "he was morally forced to resign so as not to be exposed to the suspension". In a letter to Minister Sikorski, he indicated that he expected a positive consideration of the request of Rydz-Śmigły and other officers, which would result in their retirement. At the same time he criticized Rydz:

General Śmigły, on the basis of nothing more but the note of the pavement published in the left-wing press, regardless of mine or his position in the army, handed over this scandal to the left-wing press that blew it up to a passionate political scandal. General Rydz-Śmigły by this act committed not only a reprehensible fault against me, but also threatened the peace in the Polish Army and harmed us against the foreign.

Ziemia Przemyska in the comment closing the case stated:

Without issuing a judgment about the incident, one can not forget one thing: no matter what and by whom is being said of General Latinik, it will remain the fact that his name will always be closely related to the struggles for Cieszyn Silesia and Warsaw, that he bravely defended as its governor in 1920. These are the titles for recognition and kind goodbye to Latinik when he moves to the quiet of his home.

Latinik has been out of active service since March 1, 1925. Although the authorities approved his dismissal, they did not take into account the prior request of the malcontent legionaries.
