= Orlicz =

Orlicz is a Polish surname derived from the nickname Orzeł, "eagle". Historical feminine forms: Orliczowa (by husband), Orliczówna (by father).

- Gustaw Orlicz-Dreszer, (1889−1936), Polish general, and a political and social activist
- Władysław Orlicz (1903–1990), Polish mathematician
- Zofia Orliczowa (1898–1999), Polish teacher, lieutenant of the Home Army
