= Danuta Rinn =

Polish singer and actress (1936–2006)

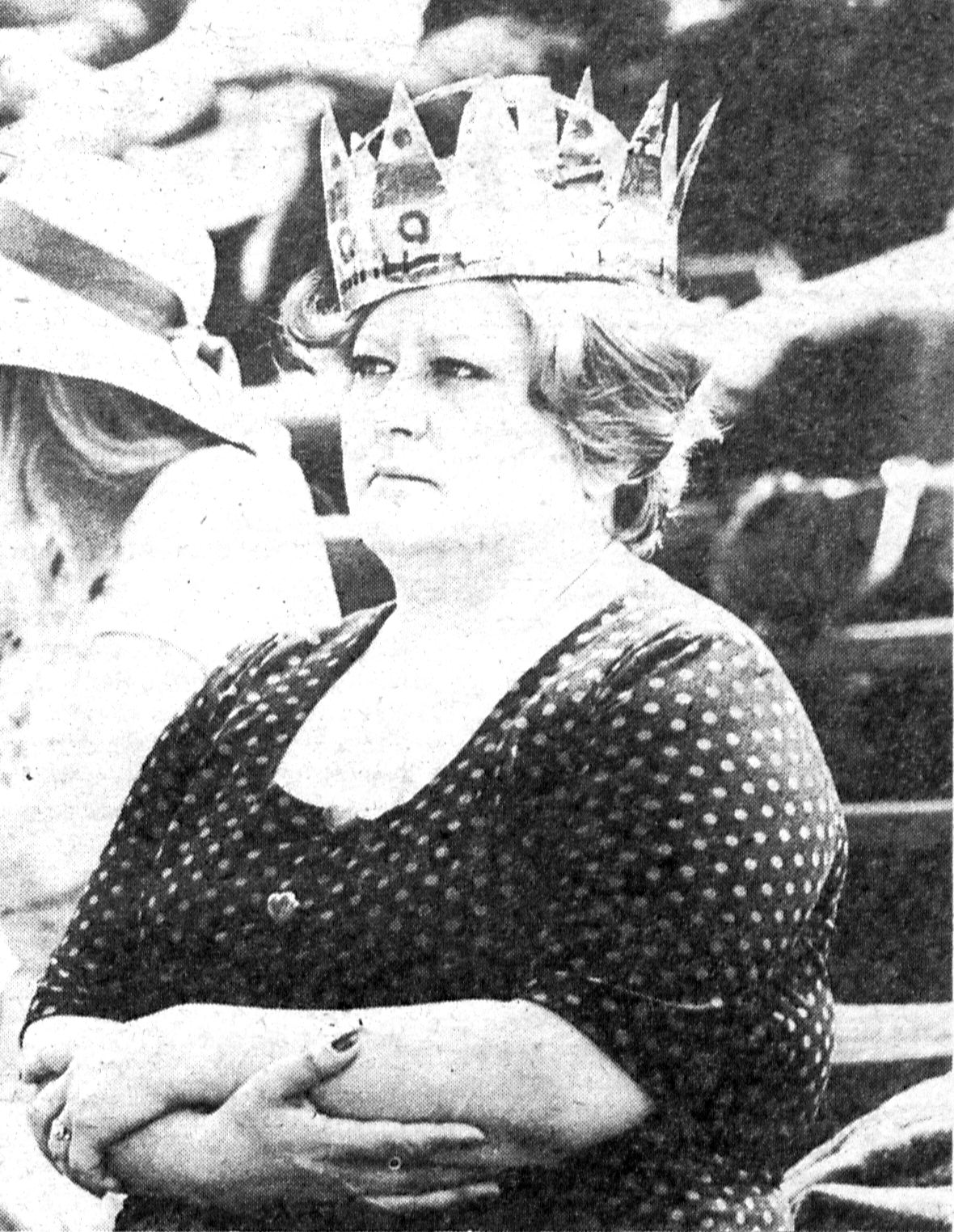

Background information
- Born: Danuta Smykla; 17 July 1936
- Origin: Kraków, Poland
- Died: 19 December 2006 (aged 70)
- Genres: jazz, pop
- Occupations: singer, actress
- Years active: 1963–2006

Danuta Rynduch-Czyżewska née Smykla, better known under her stage name Danuta Rinn (17 July 1936 – 19 December 2006) was a Polish singer and actress.

== Biography ==
She graduated from the music school and studied at State Higher School of Music in Kraków. Since her early years she took part in recordings for Kraków Broadcasting Station. She debuted on stage in Kraków. In 1963 she moved to Warsaw and one year later married singer Bogdan Czyżewski. They performed as a duet with popular Polish big bands. The marriage broke up in 1974.

Since early 1970s she also worked as an actress. She appeared in several movies including Zazdrość i medycyna (1973) and Bilans kwartalny (1975) by Krzysztof Zanussi and Career of Nikos Dyzma (2002) by Jacek Bromski.

She was a godmother of Kinga Rusin.

Rinn died in 2006 in Warsaw and was buried at the Powązki Cemetery.

== Discography ==
=== With Bogdan Czyżewski ===
- 1966: Całujmy się (Let's Kiss)
- 1969: Pamiętaj o mnie (Remember Me)
- 1971: Nie obiecuj nie przyrzekaj (Don't Promise, Don't Swear)

=== Solo ===
- 1975: Gdzie ci mężczyźni (Where Are These Men)
- 1977: Danuta Rinn
- 1989: Polska baba (Polish Broad)
- 1998: Jeszcze jestem (I Still Am)
- 2000: Złota kolekcja: Tyle wdzięku (Gold Collection: So Much Charm), Pomaton
- 2007: Dziecięce Zoo (Childish Zoo), Pomaton EMI
- 2011: Gdzie ci mężczyźni?, MUZA
- 2014: Danuta Rinn 40 piosenek (Danuta Rinn: 40 songs), MUZA
