= Adam Gruca =

Polish orthopaedist, inventor, and surgeon

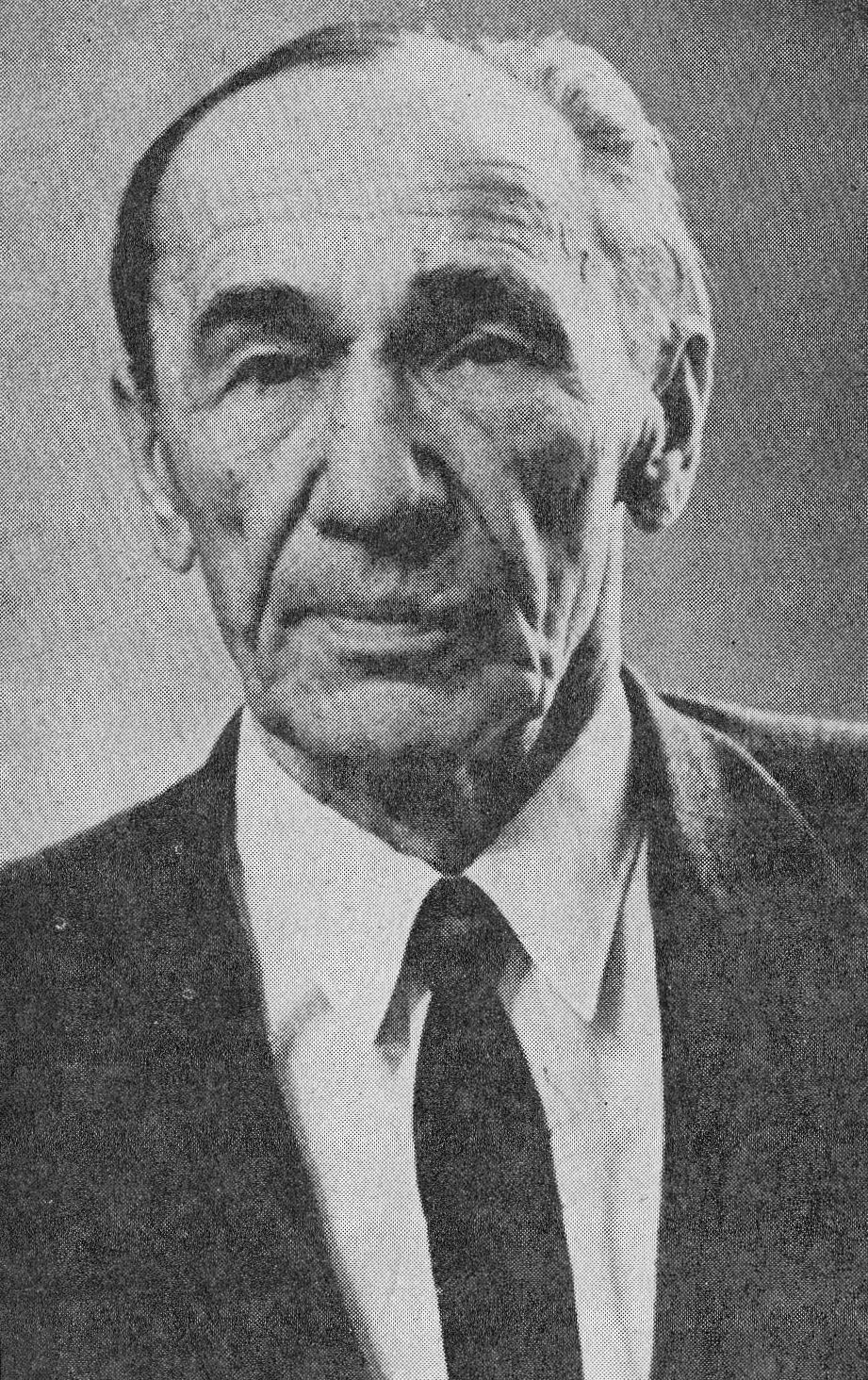
Adam Gruca

Adam Gruca (3 December 1893 in Majdan Sieniawski – 3 June 1983 in Warsaw) was a famous Polish orthopaedist, inventor, and surgeon. He is considered to be the founder of modern orthopedic surgery in Poland. Gruca also invented various orthopaedic instruments and appliances.
