= 1935 in Poland =

- Decades: 1910s; 1920s; 1930s; 1940s; 1950s
- See also: Other events of 1935; Timeline of Polish history

== Incumbents ==
On March 28, 1935, president of Poland Ignacy Mościcki designed the government under prime minister Walery Sławek, who replaced Leon Kozłowski. Sławek himself was on October 13, 1935 replaced by Marian Zyndram-Kościałkowski.

=== Members of the Third Government of Walery Sławek (March 28 - October 13, 1935) ===
- Prime Minister - Walery Sławek,
- Deputy Prime Minister and Minister of Treasury - Eugeniusz Kwiatkowski,
- Minister of Foreign Affairs - Józef Beck,
- Minister of Internal Affairs - Marian Zyndram-Kościałkowski,
- Minister of Justice - Czesław Michałowski,
- Minister of Military Affairs - Józef Piłsudski (since May 13: Tadeusz Kasprzycki),
- Minister of Agriculture - Juliusz Poniatowski,
- Minister of Communication - Michał Butkiewicz,
- Minister of Post Office and Telegraphs - Emil Kaliński,
- Minister of Religious Beliefs and Public Enlightenment - Wacław Jędrzejewicz,
- Minister of Industry and Trade - Henryk Floyar-Rajchman,
- Minister of Treasury - Władysław Marian Zawadzki,
- Minister for Social Welfare - Jerzy Paciorkowski.

=== Other personalities ===
- Primate of Poland - August Hlond,
- Marshall of the Sejm - Kazimierz Świtalski (until October 3, 1935), Stanislaw Car (since October 4, 1935),
- Marshall of the Senat - Władysław Raczkiewicz (until October 3, 1935), Aleksander Prystor (since October 4, 1935).

== Events ==
=== January ===
- January 6. Second World Zionist-Revisionist Conference begins in Kraków,
- January 10. ORP Mewa is launched,
- January 15. Polish Radio station in Toruń begins broadcasting, as the eight radio station in Poland. First flight of RWD 13 takes place,
- January 25. General Kordian Józef Zamorski is named chief of Polish State Police,

=== February ===
- February 1. Bolesław Limanowski, an early leader of Polish Socialist movement, dies in Warsaw,
- February 7. Polish - British trade agreement is signed,
- February 8. Premiere of Police Chief Antek,

=== March ===
- March 23. The Sejm votes in favour of April Constitution of Poland. The Constitution is signed one month later by President Ignacy Mościcki,
- March 28. Third government of Walery Sławek is formed, after the dissolution of the government of Leopold Kozłowski,

=== April ===
- April 7. The NSDAP wins the elections to the Volkstag of the Free City of Danzig,
- April 14. Andrzej Gwiazda is born in Pińczów,
- April 23. President Mościcki signs the April Constitution,

=== May ===
- May 12. Józef Piłsudski dies in Warsaw's Belweder. National mourning is declared,
- May 18. Official end of the funeral of Józef Piłsudski at Wawel Castle in Kraków. Edward Rydz-Śmigły becomes General Inspector of Polish Armed Forces,
- May 20. Warsaw University is named after Józef Piłsudski,

=== June ===
- June 28. New electoral system is introduced in Poland,

=== July ===
- July 3. Historian Michał Bobrzyński dies in Łopuchówek near Poznań,
- July 6-7. Polish Track and Field Championships take place
- July 10. Polish Parliament is dissolved,

=== August ===
- August 1. Construction of the Kasprowy Wierch Cable Car begins,
- August 4. Sprinter Stanisława Walasiewicz sets world 200 meters record,

=== September ===
- September 3. Dar Pomorza returns to Gdynia, after its successful voyage around the world,
- September 8. Nationwide election to the Sejm,
- September 15. Nationwide election to the Senate. MS Piłsudski enters the regular service,
- September 16. Polish crew Zbigniew Burzyński and Władysław Wysocki wins the Gordon Bennett Cup (ballooning). Poland again becomes a member of the Council of the League of Nations,
- September 25. Premiere of Dwie Joasie, featuring Jadwiga Smosarska and Ina Benita,

=== October ===
- October 13. The government of Marian Zyndram-Kościałkowski is formed,
- October 24. Film director Marek Piwowski is born in Warsaw,
- October 25. Premiere of Rapsodia Bałtyku,
- October 30. The Nonpartisan Bloc for Cooperation with the Government is dissolved upon the decision of Prime Minister Walery Sławek.

=== December ===
- December 7. Main building of AGH University of Science and Technology is completed in Kraków. Its construction lasted 14 years,
- December 12. Premiere of Kochaj Tylko Mnie.

== Sources ==
- Ilustrowany Kurjer Codzienny in digital version
