= Majdan Sieniawski =

- Village
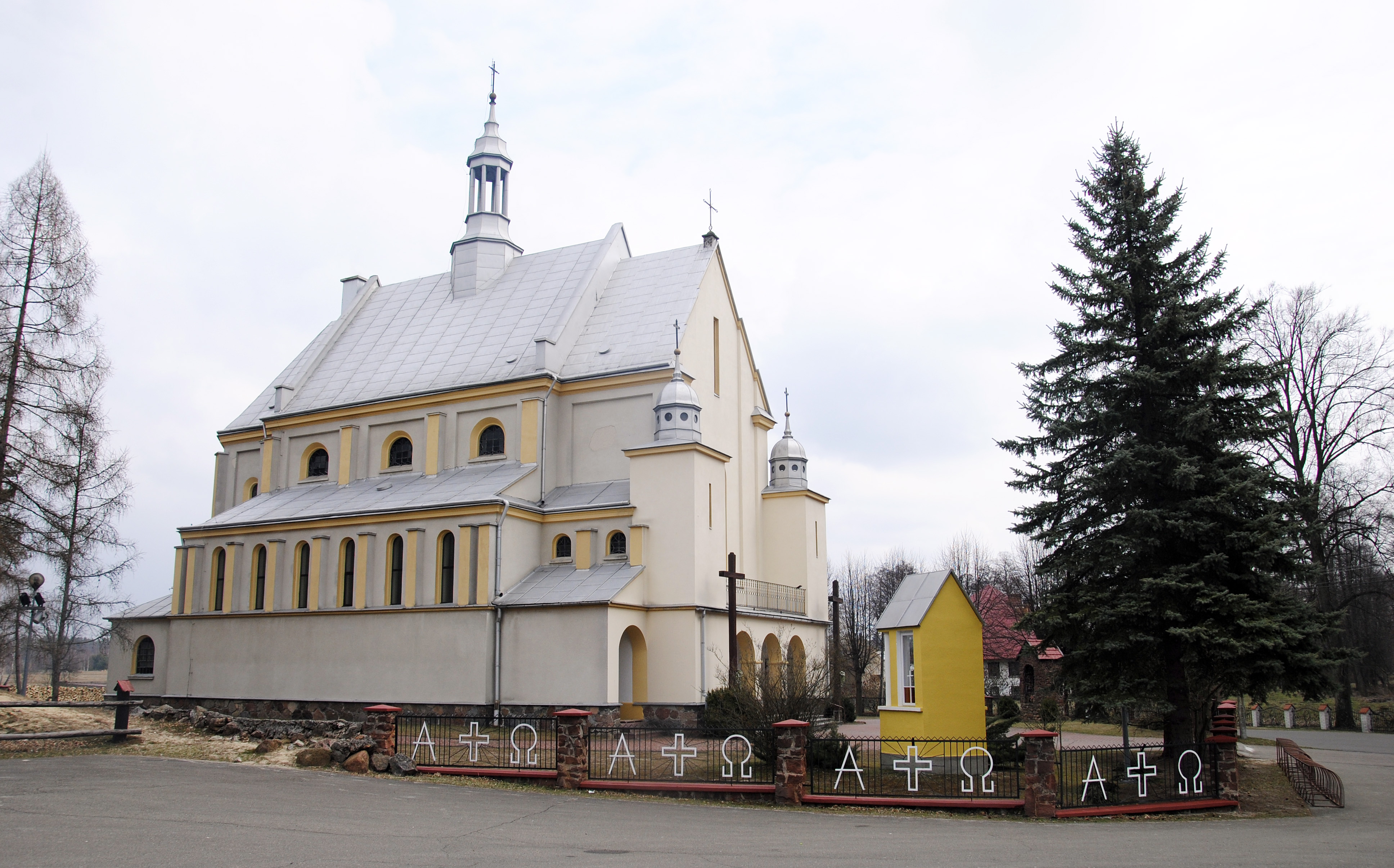
- Church of Saint Nicholas the Bishop

- Location within Poland
- Coordinates: 50°17′N 22°43′E
- Country: Poland
- Voivodeship: Subcarpathian
- County: Przeworsk
- Gmina: Adamówka
- Founded: 17th century
- Founded by: Mikołaj Sieniawski
- Named after: Mikołaj Sieniawski
- Elevation: 206 m (676 ft)

Population
  - Total: 1,600
- Time zone: UTC+1 (CET)
  - Summer (DST): UTC+2 (CEST)
- Vehicle registration: RPZ

Majdan Sieniawski (Polish pronunciation: [ˈmajdan ɕɛˈɲafskʲi]) is a village in the administrative district of Gmina Adamówka, within Przeworsk County, Subcarpathian Voivodeship, in south-eastern Poland.

== History ==
The village was founded in the 17th century. Initially it was called Dobropole, however, it was soon renamed to Majdan Sieniawski after its founder, nobleman Mikołaj Sieniawski from the Sieniawski noble family. In 1835, August Czartoryski established an institute for poor elderly people in the village. In 1881, the village had a population of 2,442, overwhelmingly Catholic by confession.

== Sports ==
The local football club is GKS Majdan Sieniawski. It competes in the lower leagues.

== Notable people ==
- Adam Gruca (1893–1983), renown Polish orthopaedist, inventor, and surgeon
