= Antoni Roman =

Polish politician

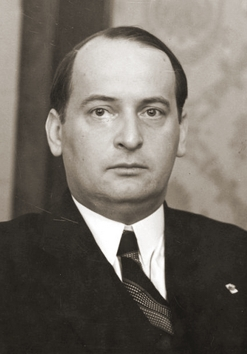
- Born: September 10, 1892
- Died: April 28, 1951 (aged 58)
- Occupation: Politician

Antoni Roman (10 September 1892 - 28 April 1951) was a Polish politician, senator, diplomat and minister of trade and commerce in the Second Polish Republic.

Roman was born in Warsaw, which was then part of Russian-controlled Congress Poland. He graduated from a Russian language high school in Warsaw (1910), and continued his education at the Technische Hochschule in Charlottenburg (now Technische Universität Berlin), German Empire. His studies were interrupted by the outbreak of World War I. Roman in 1915 went to Sankt Petersburg, working as a civil servant. He also was an active member of Polish organizations.

In 1918, Antoni Roman returned to Warsaw, finding a job at the Ministry of Trade and Commerce. In 1919, he was transferred to the Ministry of International Affairs, and was later on sent to New York, as a deputy consul. In 1922 - 1926, Roman studied economics at Poznań University. In 1927 he returned to the Ministry of International Affairs. He was a Polish attache in the Free City of Danzig and participated in several diplomatic missions. Furthermore, he lectured at the universities in Warsaw and Lwów.

In 1934, Roman became Polish envoy to Sweden, where he remained until May 1936. During this time, he conducted negotiations between Poland and Danzig. Upon returning to Poland, he was named Minister of Trade and Commerce in the government of Felicjan Sławoj Składkowski. Roman remained in his post until 30 September 1939. At the same time, he also was a senator upon the nomination of President Ignacy Mościcki. In May 1939, he opened Polish pavilion at 1939 New York World's Fair.

Roman spent World War II in Romania, together with Józef Beck. He returned to Poland after the war, and took a job at the re-created Ministry of Trade and Commerce. Diagnosed with diabetes, he died in Warsaw in 1951, and was buried at the Powązki Cemetery. He had a wife, Maria née Załęska; the couple had no children.

Among Roman's awards were: Order of Polonia Restituta (1933), Order of St. Sava, Order of the Crown (Belgium), Order of the Three Stars, and Order of Vasa.
