= Petr Ulrych (ice hockey) =

Czech ice hockey player

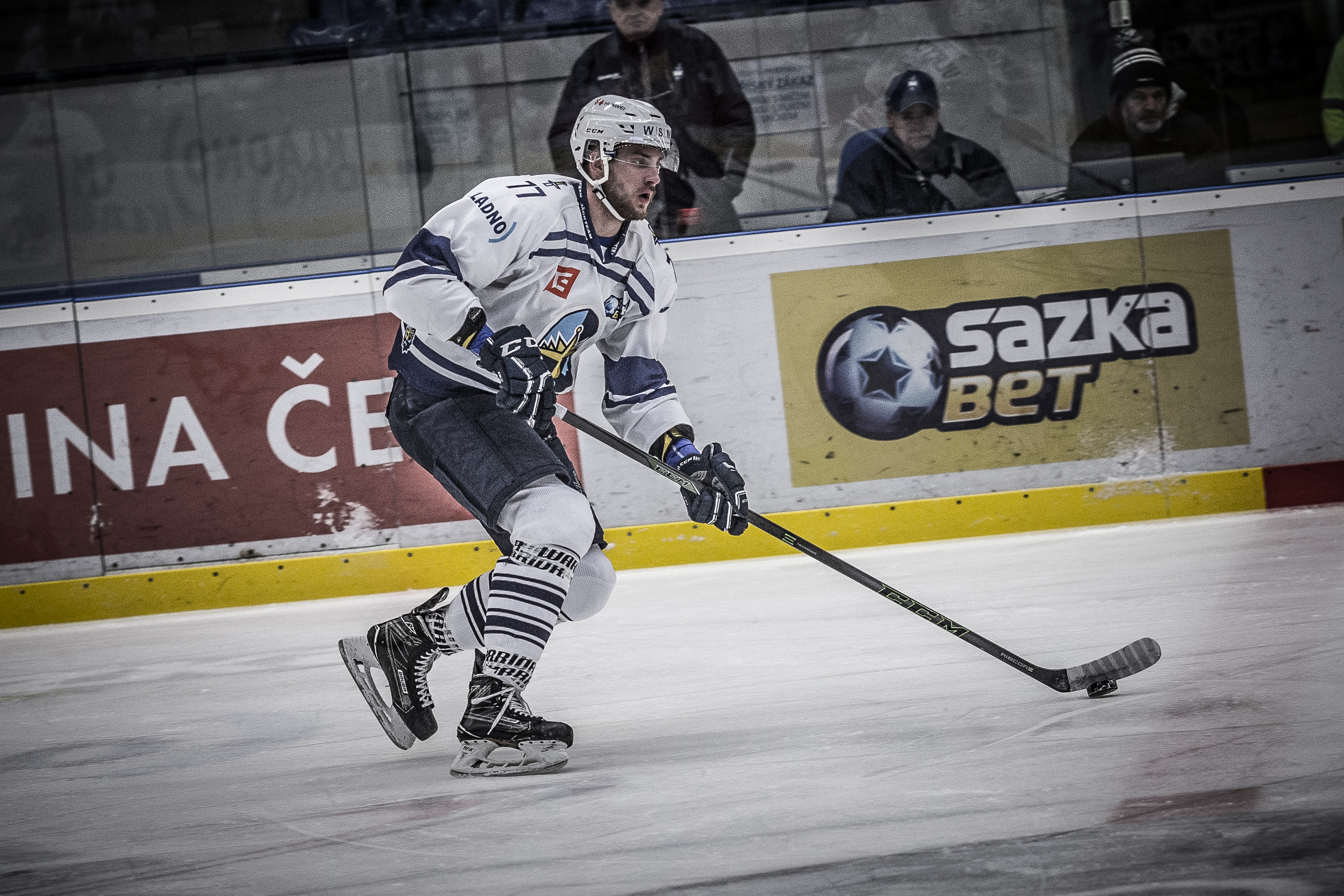
- Born: 6 June 1987 (age 37); Liberec, Czechoslovakia
- Height: 6 ft 5 in (196 cm)
- Weight: 214 lb (97 kg; 15 st 4 lb)
- Position: Defence
- Shoots: Left
- Slovak 1. Liga team Former teams: Vlci Žilina; HC Jablonec nad Nisou; HC Bílí Tygři Liberec; HC Benátky nad Jizerou; NED Hockey Nymburk; Rytíři Kladno; HC Dukla Jihlava; HKM Zvolen; HK Poprad; HK Dukla Trenčín
- NHL draft: Undrafted
- Playing career: 2006–present

Petr Ulrych (born 6 June 1987) is a Czech professional ice hockey player who currently playing for Vlci Žilina of the Slovak 1. Liga.

== Career ==
Ulrych made his Czech Extraliga debut playing with HC Bílí Tygři Liberec during the 2010–11 Czech Extraliga season.

== Career statistics ==
=== Regular season and playoffs ===
			Regular season					Playoffs
Season	Team	League	GP	G	A	Pts	PIM	GP	G	A	Pts	PIM
2003–04	HC Bílí Tygři Liberec	Czech U18	20	0	1	1	23	—	—	—	—	—
2004–05	HC Jablonec nad Nisou	Czech U18.1	—	—	—	—	—	—	—	—	—	—
2005–06	HC Jablonec nad Nisou	Czech-Jr.1	—	—	—	—	—	—	—	—	—	—
2006–07	HC Jablonec nad Nisou	Czech-Jr.1	—	—	—	—	—	—	—	—	—	—
2006–07	HC Jablonec nad Nisou	Czech.2	21	1	3	4	18	8	0	0	0	12
2007–08	HC Jablonec nad Nisou	Czech.2	24	2	5	7	28	4	0	0	0	0
2008–09	HC Jablonec nad Nisou	Czech.2	33	6	9	15	44	3	0	0	0	14
2009–10	Did not play
2010–11	HC Bílí Tygři Liberec	Czech	3	1	0	1	0	6	0	0	0	0
2010–11	HC Benátky nad Jizerou	Czech.1	23	1	4	5	6	5	0	0	0	4
2010–11	NED Hockey Nymburk	Czech.2	12	1	6	7	20	—	—	—	—	—
2011–12	HC Bílí Tygři Liberec	Czech	33	0	3	3	16	8	0	1	1	16
2011–12	HC Benátky nad Jizerou	Czech.1	19	1	3	4	12	—	—	—	—	—
2012–13	HC Bílí Tygři Liberec	Czech	10	0	1	1	2	—	—	—	—	—
2012–13	HC Benátky nad Jizerou	Czech.1	30	0	1	1	2	—	—	—	—	—
2013–14	HC Bílí Tygři Liberec	Czech	9	0	0	0	12	—	—	—	—	—
2013–14	HC Benátky nad Jizerou	Czech.1	32	2	4	6	59	5	0	0	0	33
2014–15	HC Bílí Tygři Liberec	Czech	16	0	2	2	30	—	—	—	—	—
2014–15	HC Benátky nad Jizerou	Czech.1	42	1	7	8	88	2	0	0	0	25
2015–16	HC Bílí Tygři Liberec	Czech	17	1	0	1	29	—	—	—	—	—
2015–16	HC Benátky nad Jizerou	Czech.1	28	1	2	3	91	—	—	—	—	—
2016–17	Rytíři Kladno	Czech.1	48	1	12	13	50	8	0	1	1	16
2017–18	HC Dukla Jihlava	Czech	29	0	4	4	18	—	—	—	—	—
2017–18	HKM Zvolen	Slovak	15	0	2	2	4	11	0	3	3	41
2018–19	HKM Zvolen	Slovak	46	2	8	10	74	12	0	0	0	25
2019–20	HK Poprad	Slovak	49	5	19	24	75	—	—	—	—	—
2020–21	HK Poprad	Slovak	42	1	7	8	51	13	0	0	0	39
2021–22	HK Poprad	Slovak	49	2	9	11	76	7	0	1	1	4
2022–23	HK Dukla Trenčín	Slovak	48	2	8	10	59	5	0	1	1	2
Czech totals			117	2	10	12	107	14	0	1	1	16
Slovak totals			249	12	53	65	339	48	0	5	5	111
