= Aleksander Litwinowicz =

Polish general

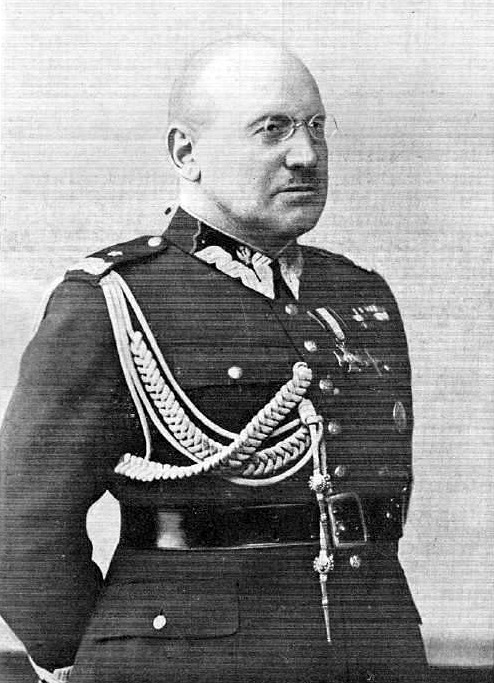
- Aleksander Litwinowicz
- Born: 1879; Saint Petersburg
- Died: 1948 (aged 68–69)
- Military career
- Allegiance: Poland
- Branch: Polish Legions
- Service years: 1914–1918
- Rank: General; Second Deputy Minister of War and Chief of Army Administration
- Conflicts: World War I
- Awards: Silver Cross of Virtuti Militari

Aleksander Litwinowicz (1879–1948) was a Polish general who was a member of Polish Independence Organizations before World War I and a member of the Polish Legions during the war. Litwinowicz was promoted to general in 1924. From 1936 to 1939 he was the Second Deputy Minister of War and Chief of Army Administration.

In 1920, he became the first president of the Legia Military Sports Club.

== Honours and awards ==
- Silver Cross of the Virtuti Militari
- Commander's Cross of the Order of Polonia Restituta
- Cross of Independence
- Order of the Cross of the Eagle, Class II (Estonia, 1935)
