= Cezary Kuleszyński =

Polish hurdler

Cezary Kuleszyński (27 November 1937 – 2 January 2011) was a Polish male hurdler.
