= Edward Hulewicz =

Polish singer (1937–2022)

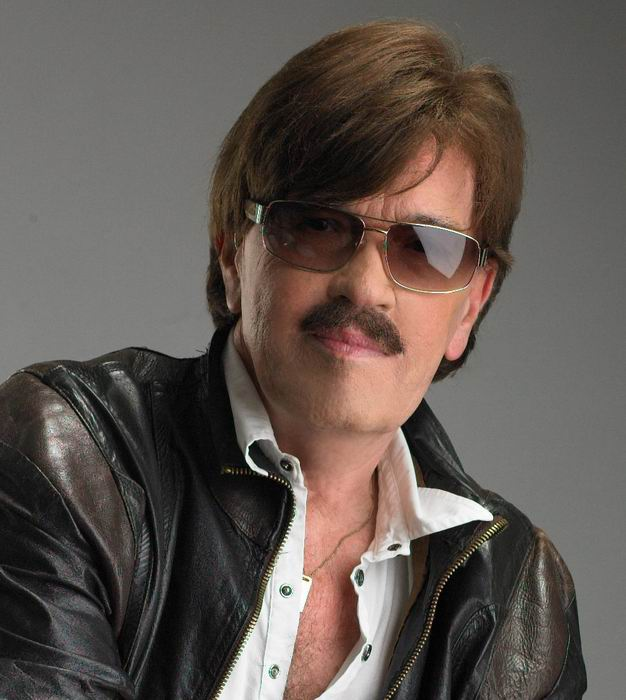
- Born: 22 November 1937; Berezne, Poland
- Died: 4 September 2022 (aged 84); Warsaw, Poland
- Occupation: Singer

Edward Hulewicz (22 November 1937 – 4 September 2022) was a Polish singer and composer.

== Life and career ==
Born in Berezne, the son of a professional violinist, Hulewicz studied at the Higher School of Pedagogy in Gdańsk and started his career in the mid-1960s with the band Tarpany, best known for the Hulewicz-penned hit "Siała baba mak". After the breakup of the group, Hulewicz entered another popular band of the time, Heliosi, with whom he also collaborated as a composer and recorded several singles including the hit "Obietnice".

Hulewicz began his solo career in 1971, getting the peak of his fame thanks to the participation in several editions of the Sopot International Song Festival and of the Opole Song Festival, and to hits such as "Za Zdrowie Pań", "Paskuda" and "Bo jedno życie mam". In the 1980s he moved to the US, where he continued performing in Polish-American community clubs and venues, before moving back to Poland in 2005.

During his career Hulewicz received various honours, notably the Medal for Merit to Culture – Gloria Artis.

He died of cancer on 4 September 2022, at the age of 84.
