= Barbara Rylska =

Polish actress (1936–2025)

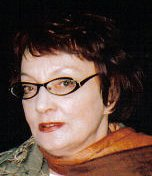
- Born: 20 January 1936; Warsaw, Poland
- Died: 11 January 2025 (aged 88)
- Education: The Aleksander Zelwerowicz National Academy of Dramatic Art
- Known for: Acting

Barbara Rylska (20 January 1936 – 11 January 2025) was a Polish actress and comedian.

== Life and career ==
Rylska graduated the Aleksander Zelwerowicz National Academy of Dramatic Art in Warsaw in 1959 and began her theatre career in the same year. She gained popularity for the 1972 film Poszukiwany - poszukiwana, and in the 1960s she won the Golden and Silver Masks five times for most popular television actors. Rylska died on 11 January 2025, at the age of 88.

She was the Polish voice of Alice in the Disney's Alice in Wonderland.

== Films ==
- Księżyc z Alabamy - 1961
- Ostani kurs - 1963
- Smarkula - 1963
- No More Divorces - 1964
- Julia, Anna, Genowefa - 1968
- Poszukiwany-poszukiwana - 1972
