= Felicjan Sławoj Składkowski =

Prime Minister of Poland (1936–1939)

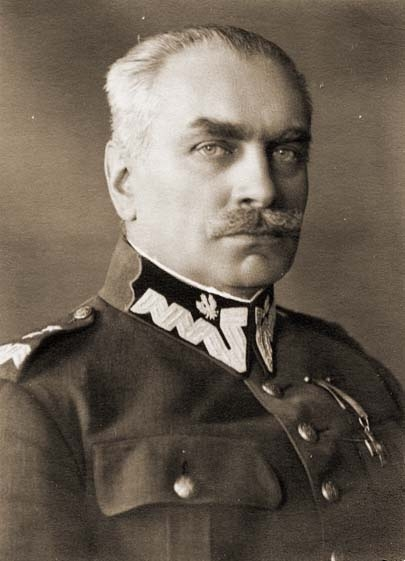
- Składkowski in 1938

28th Prime Minister of Poland
- In office 15 May 1936 – 30 September 1939
- President: Ignacy Mościcki
- Deputy: Eugeniusz Kwiatkowski
- Preceded by: Marian Zyndram-Kościałkowski
- Succeeded by: Władysław Sikorski (in exile); Edward Osóbka-Morawski (As Prime Minister of the People's Republic of Poland)

Personal details
- Born: 9 June 1885 Gąbin, Congress Poland, Russian Empire
- Died: 31 August 1962 (aged 77) London, England
- Resting place: Powązki Cemetery, Warsaw
- Spouse(s): Jadwiga Szoll; Germaine Susanne Coillot; Jadwiga Dołęga-Mostowicz
- Profession: Physician, military officer
- Awards: Virtuti Militari

Military service
- Allegiance: Poland
- Branch/service: Polish Legions; Polish Army
- Years of service: 1914–1939
- Rank: Generał dywizji (Major general)
- Battles/wars: World War I Polish–Soviet War; World War II

Felicjan Sławoj Składkowski (Note: Polish: [fɛˈlit͡sjan ˈswavɔj skwatˈkɔfskʲi]) (9 June 1885 – 31 August 1962) was a Polish physician, general, and politician who served as Minister of Internal Affairs and as the 28th Prime Minister of Poland before and at the outbreak of World War II. He was the longest-serving prime minister of the Second Polish Republic.

Składkowski studied medicine at the Jagiellonian University in Kraków, graduating in 1911. He then worked as a physician in Sosnowiec. He fought in the Polish Legions in World War I and later in the Polish–Soviet War. In 1924, as a brigadier general, he was appointed head of the Polish military health service by Józef Piłsudski. After the May Coup of 1926, Składkowski served as Minister of the Interior, a post he held (with one short break) until June 1931. After that, he was appointed Deputy Minister of War. On 13 May 1936 Składkowski became Prime Minister and Minister of the Interior. He was Poland's longest serving prime minister during the inter-war years, his cabinet lasting for 3 years and 4 months, until 30 September 1939. He was also the first Polish Protestant (a convert from Roman Catholicism to Calvinism) to hold that position.

While serving as prime minister, he was appalled by the lack of sanitation in many of Poland's villages, and issued a decree that every household in Poland must have a latrine in working order. (Note: This prompted many village-dwellers to erect wooden latrines in their backyards for this purpose, which have been subsequently dubbed "sławojki".) Together with his deputy, Eugeniusz Kwiatkowski, his peacetime tenure saw progressing recovery from the Great Depression amid many public works projects such as the Central Industrial Region (COP). After the German Invasion of Poland on 1 September 1939, he fled to Romania and was interned there. In 1940 he went to Turkey and thence to Palestine. In 1947, he went to London, where he died in 1962. He was buried in Brompton Cemetery, London.

== Early years and studies ==
Born on 9 June 1885 in Gąbin, Congress Poland, Sławoj Składkowski was raised in a family with strong patriotic beliefs. His father, Wincenty Składkowski, who was a court judge at Gąbin, as a 16-year-old fought in the January Uprising against Tsarist troops for freedom of partitioned Poland, and following the Uprising's defeat was forced to serve in the Imperial Russian Army. Felicjan was one of six children: he had one brother, Bożywoj, and four sisters, Dobrosława, Tomiła, Mirosława and youngest Wincencja, who died in infancy. Initially his parents intended to name him Sławoj, but local parish priests at Gąbin did not give the permission for it, as such a name was not listed in church books. Under the circumstances, the boy was named Felicjan. He later added Sławoj to his legal name.

Składkowski attended a middle school in Łowicz and a high school in Kielce, where he actively protested and campaigned against the Russification of Congress Kingdom (the Russian Partition) and the Germanization of the Prussian Partition of Poland. After graduation, in 1904, he studied medicine at the University of Warsaw. On 13 November 1904, he participated in a patriotic demonstration at Warsaw's Grzybowski Square. Arrested by Tsarist authorities, he was sent to the infamous Pawiak Prison. After one month, Składkowski was sent back to Kielce and placed under police surveillance. To continue the studies, he left for Austrian Galicia, and in March 1906 joined the Medical Department of the Jagiellonian University in Kraków. Before that, however, in 1905, he became a member of the Polish Socialist Party – Revolutionary Faction.

On 15 February 1909, Felicjan married Jadwiga Szoll, with whom he had a son named Miłosz (1911–1938). In 1911, Składkowski graduated from the university as a surgeon and gynecologist. In January 1912, he was employed at the clinic of Professor Kadler and practiced his skills in Sosnowiec.

== Polish Legions ==
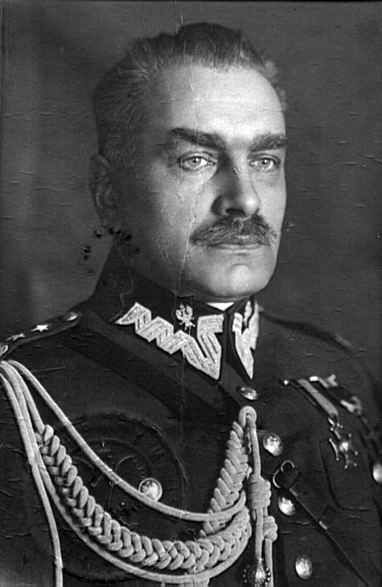
Sławoj-Składkowski in dress uniform

After the outbreak of World War I, together with one of the organizers of the Rifle Association in the Dąbrowa Basin, Stanisław Zwierzyński, he joined the Polish Legions stationed in Miechów on 13 August 1914. Initially he served as a doctor in the 5th Battalion of the 1st Regiment of Infantry. During this period, for the first time he met with the future chief-of-state and Marshal of Poland, Józef Piłsudski. On 9 October 1914 Składkowski was appointed second lieutenant.

From 20 December 1914, he served as chief physician of the 1st Regiment of Infantry. On 1 January 1915 he was appointed lieutenant doctor, however, on 26 January he was transferred to the 3rd Battalion of the 1st Regiment of Infantry. Składkowski soon became very ill and was transported to a hospital located in the nearby town of Kęty.

On 1 February 1915, Składkowski returned to medical military service and was appointed physician of the 1st Battalion of the 1st Regiment of Infantry. Then, from 28 April until 7 May 1915 he held the position of chief medical officer of the 5th Infantry Unit. From 11 May 1915 he was chief physician of the 7th Regiment of Infantry. On 10 May 1915 he was promoted to the rank of captain doctor and his medical services covered all of the Polish Legions. In July 1916, he distinguished himself during the Battle of Kostiuchnówka. From 1 October 1916, after the dissolution of the 7th Regiment of Infantry, Składkowski became chief physician of the 5th Infantry Unit.

On 16 July 1917, during the Oath crisis, Składkowski, who officially was considered a Russian subject, was released from the service in the Legions. On 22 July 1917 he was interned in Beniaminów, and remained there until 2 August 1918. After his release, Składkowski worked as a physician at Saturn Coal Mine in the city of Czeladź.

== Polish Army ==
In November 1918, Składkowski, wearing his Legions uniform, disarmed German soldiers in the region of Zagłębie Dąbrowskie. Being a captain, he took over command of the newly created Polish Army in the area, and briefly commanded the Military District of Zagłębie Dąbrowskie. On 3 February 1919, Składkowski was named chief of staff of Colonel Rudolf Tarnawski, commandant of Będzin Military District. Promoted to major, he became chief medical officer of the newly formed 2nd Legions Infantry Division. With this unit, he fought in the Polish–Soviet War, capturing Minsk in August 1919.

In the autumn of 1919, Składkowski was named chief medical officer of the Operational Group of General Lucjan Żeligowski. On 7 February 1920, he was appointed to the post of manager of the organizational section of the Ministry of Military Affairs' Medical Department. Promoted to colonel, in August 1920 he was a government envoy to the Polish Red Cross. In January 1921, Składowski was named inspector of medical units of the Polish Army. He then left for France, for a course at the École spéciale militaire de Saint-Cyr.

In November 1924, he was one of the officers who resigned from active service in the so-called strike of the generals; the joint resignation of the officers was, however, rejected. On 1 December 1924, Składkowski was promoted to brigadier general.

While in France, he met and fell in love with a Frenchwoman, Germaine Susanne Coillot. In 1925, he converted to Calvinism in order to get a divorce from his first wife, Jadwiga Szoll. In January 1926, he married his French love, who changed her last name into Coillot-Składkowska.

During the May Coup, Składkowski supported Józef Piłsudski, and, on 13 May 1926, General Gustaw Orlicz-Dreszer appointed him government commissar for Warsaw. Since he was regarded as an able organizer, he was tasked with keeping order on the streets of the Polish capital.

On 14 May 1926, Składkowski's police force broke a communist rally at the Bank Square, Warsaw. He remained in the post of government commissar until 1 October 1926, when he was replaced by Władysław Jaroszewicz.

== Minister of Internal Affairs ==
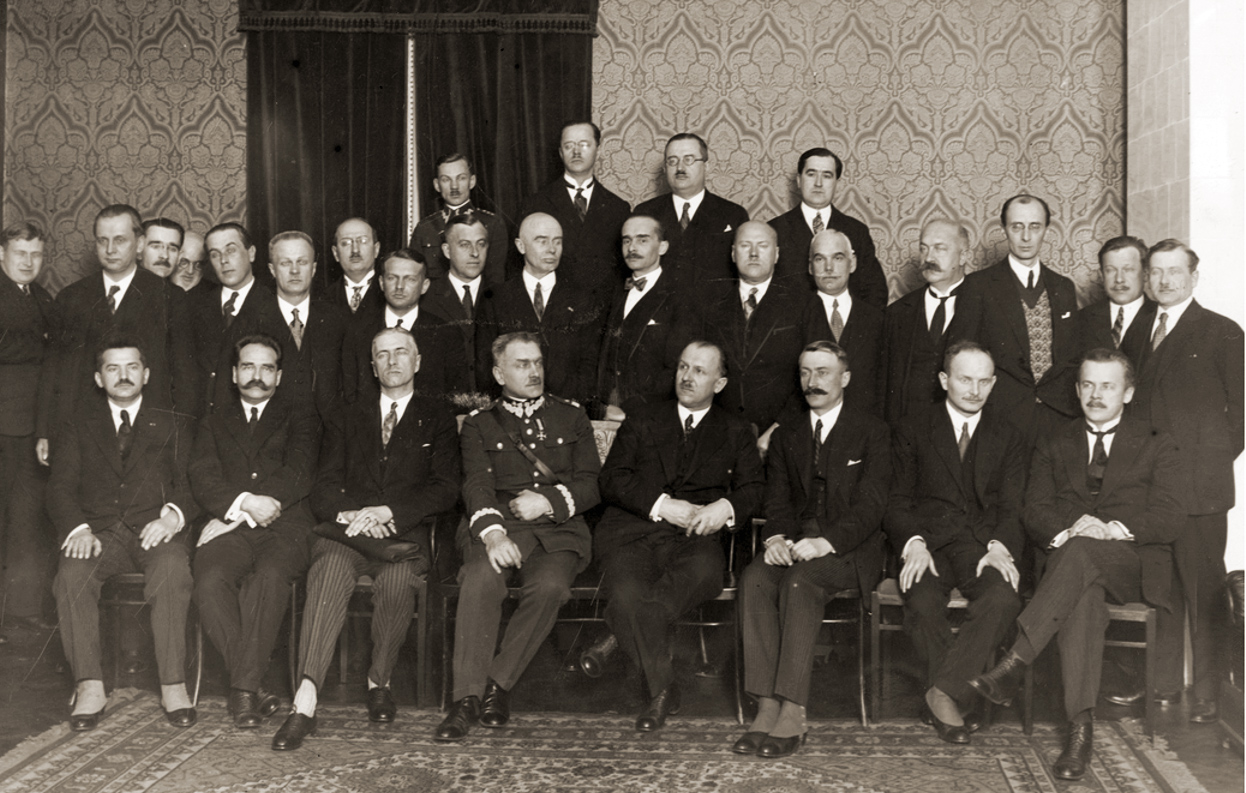
Official meeting of voivodes in 1929. Składkowski is sitting next to Kazimierz Bartel in the centre.

On 2 October 1926, Składkowski, who by then was widely known as an avid supporter of Józef Piłsudski, was nominated the Minister of Internal Affairs. He served in this post under three prime ministers: Piłsudski, Kazimierz Bartel and Kazimierz Świtalski. Avoiding political infighting, he was a skillful and energetic administrator and organizer. On 27 March 1928, during a session of the Sejm (Polish parliament), communist envoys and senators interrupted the speech of Marshal Piłsudski, shouting out anti-government slogans. Składkowski personally led a police unit, ordering the officers to take the communists out of the chamber.

Sławoj remained in his post for over three years, until 7 December 1929. On 1 January 1930, he returned to the armed forces and was appointed Deputy Minister of Military Affairs and head of the Army Administration. On 3 June 1930, he became the minister of internal affairs again. In early autumn of that year, he oversaw the Pacification of Ukrainians in Eastern Galicia. Furthermore, he signed arrests of opposition deputies, who were sent to Brest Fortress after the dissolution of the Sejm (30 August 1930). He then participated in the organization of the so-called Brest Election.

As a minister, who was a physician by profession, Składkowski was very concerned about the poor state of hygiene on Polish farms and estates in the countryside. One of his executive orders stated that outhouses should be erected in all villages of Poland. As a result, the Polish population began to call them "sławojki", after Sławoj-Składkowski.

On 23 June 1931, Składkowski returned to active military service, becoming deputy minister of military affairs and manager of the Army Administration. Personally, Felicjan Sławoj was extremely close with Józef Piłsudski, often being invited with his wife to the marshal's parties or dinners, and was one of the first people to receive the sad news about his unexpected death in 1935. On 19 March 1931, Składkowski was promoted to the rank of divisional general (generał dywizji) of the Polish Army.

== Prime Minister of Poland ==
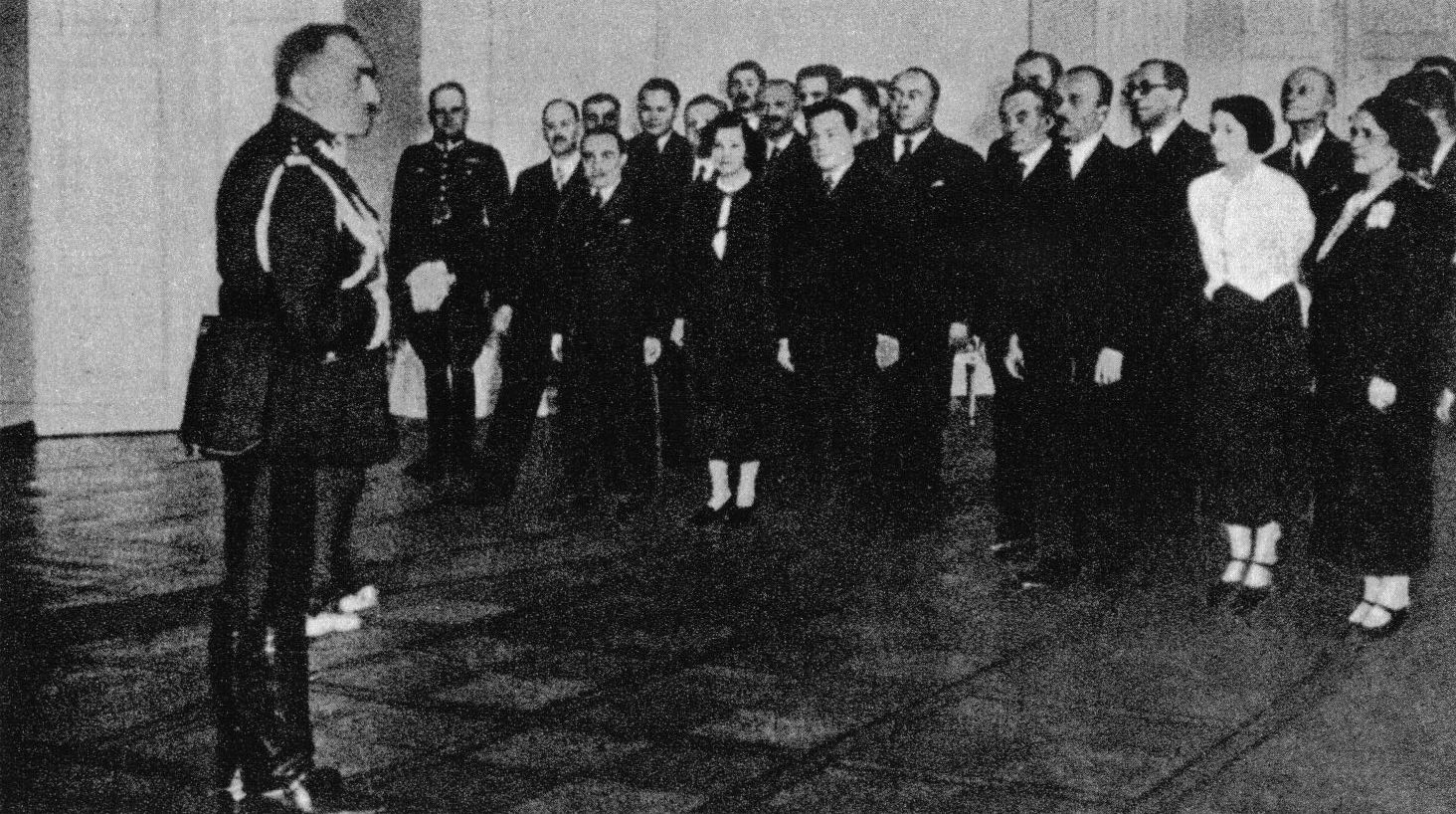
Prime Minister Składkowski addressing Chancellery employees upon his nomination, May 1936

After Piłsudski's death, the camp of his followers divided into factions, including the supporters of President Ignacy Mościcki, and those who favoured Marshal Edward Rydz-Śmigły. In the spring of 1936, both groups agreed on a compromise and created the government of Prime Minister Felicjan Sławoj-Składkowski (15 May 1936). On 4 June 1936, Składkowski gave a speech in parliament, in which he stated that he was nominated to his post by both the president and the marshal. Among the members of his government were politicians of different factions, such as Eugeniusz Kwiatkowski and Minister of Foreign Affairs Józef Beck. Składkowski himself tried to stay away from any political conflicts, and concentrated his efforts on improving the state administration, especially police force and civil services. He frequently toured Poland, visiting schools, police stations, manufacturing plants and farm estates.

As Prime Minister, Składkowski gave in to the rising tide of class struggle, calling in June 1936 for "economic struggle" against the Polish Jews. Składkowski opposed anti-Jewish violence but was not diligent in combating it. Commenting at one occasion on the "unpleasant events" (presumably, the numerous cases of physical violence against Jews), he claimed that Jews themselves were to blame because of their lack of understanding of Polish peasantry, which, just as the Jews themselves, was striving for a higher standard of living. Under his government, Polish Jews were increasingly isolated from society, impoverished and demonized. Polish officials pursued the idea of Jewish emigration at the League of Nations and in bilateral talks with France and other relevant powers.

On 12 January 1939, in replying to the Jewish Deputy Leib Minzberg, who had protested against spreading anti-Semitism in Poland, Składkowski said that the Polish government was determined to solve the Jewish problem "without violence and chicanery": "The Jewish question must be settled not by force, but by Government collaboration with Jewish emigration associations". Skladkowski denied that the "Jewish position in Poland" was bad and claimed that to be "inconsistent with the desire of the Jews to make a pilgrimage to Poland as to a Mecca", which he declared to be inadmissible. He was apparently referring to the desire of Polish Jews facing expulsion from Germany and Italy to be repatriated, which Składkowski's government blocked by denying Polish citizenship to Jews living abroad.

On 1 September 1939 at 4:30 a.m., Składkowski, who spent the night in the complex of the Ministry of Internal Affairs, received a phone call from Kraków, informing him about the German invasion of Poland and a brutal attack in the border town of Chojnice. The next day he gave a speech in the Sejm, expressing his hope that Poland would defeat the Third Reich and win the war. On 7 September at 2 a.m., Składkowski left Warsaw, heading eastwards. After spending some time in Łuck, Wołyń, on 15 September he arrived at Kosów, near the border with Romania.

On 17 September, upon hearing of the Soviet invasion of Poland, Składkowski crossed the Romanian border on the Czeremosz River bridge near Kuty. On 30 September, interned by the Romanian government, he resigned from the post of prime minister. His resignation was accepted on 5 October 1939 by the new president-in-exile, Władysław Raczkiewicz.

== Living in exile ==
Sławoj-Składkowski was at first interned with other members of his government in the town of Slanic. In October 1939, he was transferred to Baile Herculane. There, together with Eugeniusz Kwiatkowski, he wrote a letter to President Raczkiewicz (9 October), demanding a permission to leave Romania. New Prime Minister of the Polish government-in-exile, General Władysław Sikorski, refused to grant the permission. Desperate, Składkowski asked to join the Polish Army in France, again to be denied.

Since both Hungary and Romania were threatened by Germany and the Soviet Union, General Sikorski finally agreed to a partial evacuation of high-ranking Polish officials interned in Romania. In June 1940, Składkowski was allowed to go to France, where his wife, Germaine, lived. On 24 June, after crossing Bulgaria, he arrived by train at Istanbul in Turkey. There he once again asked to join the Polish Army, but was denied on 3 July. On 3 October 1940, Składkowski sent another letter, this time to President Raczkiewicz, and finally on 24 November he was granted Sikorski's permission.

In late 1940, Składkowski was sent to the Reserve Center of the Polish Independent Carpathian Rifle Brigade (General Stanislaw Kopański). The center was located in Haifa, Mandatory Palestine, and Sławoj reached it on 10 January 1941. On 25 January, upon request of General Kordian Józef Zamorski, he was named sanitary inspector of the local units of the Polish Army. In early March 1941, he was named military envoy to Polish Red Cross in Palestine. In mid-1941, General Sikorski sent him to the Center of Army Generals in Tel Aviv, where Składkowski spent the remaining part of the war, together with Janusz Jędrzejewicz. In 1946, he married Jadwiga Dołęga-Mostowicz, and in 1947, he left Palestine for London, upon the creation of the Jewish State of Israel.

Składkowski was an active member of Polish émigré circles in Great Britain. He died on 31 August 1962 in London, and was buried at Brompton Cemetery. On 8 June 1990, his body was returned to Poland and buried at the Powązki Cemetery in Warsaw. Place of burial:

One of his relatives was the noted film director Krzysztof Kieślowski.

Sławoj Składkowski's archive is deposited at the Archiwum Emigracji in the University Library of Torun University.

== Honours and awards ==
- Polish:
  - Silver Cross of Virtuti Militari
  - Grand Cordon of the Order of Polonia Restituta (11 November 1935)
  - Cross of Independence (17 March 1932)
  - Cross of Valour (four times)
  - Gold Cross of Merit (29 April 1925)
  - Commemorative Medal for the War of 1918–1921
  - Golden Academic Laurel (5 November 1935)
  - Medal of the 10th Anniversary of Regained Independence
  - Silver Medal for Long Service (1938)
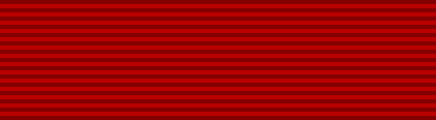
  - The Cross of the 70th Anniversary of the January Uprising (1933)
  - Badge of Honour of the Air and Anti-Gas Defence League
- Foreign:
  - Grand-officier of the Legion of Honour (France)
  - Officer of the Legion of Honour (France)
  - Commander's Cross of the Order of the White Eagle (Yugoslavia, 1926)
  - Knight Grand Cross of the Order of St. Sava (Yugoslavia, 1937)
  - Grand Cross of the Order of the Yugoslav Crown (Yugoslavia, 1933)
  - Grand Cordon of the Order of the Portrait of the Ruler (Iran, 1937)

Składkowski received honorary citizenships of Czeladź and Gąbin.

== Notes ==
Political offices
Preceded by Marian Kościałkowski-Zyndram	Prime Minister of Poland; 1936–1939	Succeeded by Władysław Sikorski (Prime Minister of the Polish Republic in Exile)
