= Radio Kraków =

Radio station in Poland

Radio Kraków Polskie Radio Kraków
- Kraków; Poland

Programming
- Language: Polish

History
- Founded: 1927

Links
- Website: radiokrakow.pl

Radio Kraków (Polish: Polskie Radio Kraków) is one of the regional stations of Polish Radio.

It was created in 1927 as the second regional station of the Polish Radio, after Polish Radio Warsaw.

It was one of the first radio stations to transmit a soccer match. It can be received in the Kraków Voivodeship and bordering entities.
