= Juliusz Ulrych =

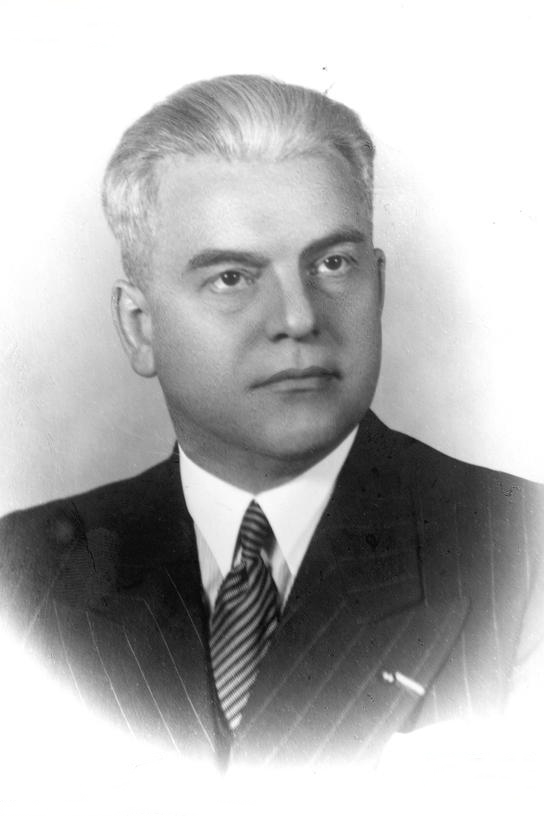
Juliusz Ulrych Portrait

Juliusz Ulrych was a soldier of the Polish Legions in World War I and a member of the Polish Military Organisation, Colonel of the Polish Army and the Minister of Communication in the government of the Second Polish Republic (1935–1939).

== Early life ==
Ulrych was born on 9 April 1888 in Kalisz, Congress Poland, in a wealthy Lutheran merchant family. His ancestors were ethnic Germans, who settled in the area of Kalisz, Turek and Stawiszyn. Ulrych, the son of Emil and Berta née Stark, attended City Classical Gymnasium in Kalisz and St. Ann Gymnasium in Kraków. After graduation, he continued his education at Lwów Polytechnic. Since his teens, Ulrych was an active member of Polish independence organizations, such as the Riflemen's Association. After the outbreak of World War I, he joined Polish Legions of Józef Piłsudski, becoming one of the officers of the 1st Legions Infantry Regiment. In late stages of the war, he was transferred to his native Kalisz, where, as a member of the Polish Military Organization, he commanded the disarming of German soldiers (November 1918). During the Polish–Soviet War (1919–1921), Ulrych, among others, formed the 29th Regiment of Kaniów Riflemen (29 Pułk Strzelców Kaniowskich). He was later awarded the Virtuti Militari and the Cross of Valour (Poland) (three times).

After the Polish–Soviet War, Ulrych worked in the Information Department of the Ministry of Military Affairs and in the Headquarters of the Polish Army. In 1922–1923, he attended Warsaw's War College (Wyższa Szkoła Wojenna). In 1927–1929, Ulrych was chairman of the State Office of Physical Education and Basic Training, and one of his main ideas was the creation of Józef Piłsudski University of Physical Education in Warsaw. In 1929–1931 he commanded the 36th Infantry Regiment (Poland). In January 1931, he was appointed deputy commandant of the 4th Office of the Army Headquarters.

On 13 October 1935 Ulrych became Minister of Communication in the government of Prime Minister Marian Zyndram-Kościałkowski. He remained in this post until 30 September 1939. Furthermore, in 1938–1939 he was a deputy to the Sejm, and in 1939 was named Chief of Communication in the Army Headquarters. On 17 September 1939 (see Soviet invasion of Poland), Ulrych, together with his family and other members of Polish government, crossed the Polish-Romanian border. He was interned by the Romanian government in Băile Herculane. In 1940, Ulrych left Romania and via Turkey and Cyprus he went to France, where he wanted to join Polish forces. Newly formed Polish government-in-exile, under General Władysław Sikorski, did not allow him to enter the army, and Ulrych was transferred to clerical work. In 1941 Ulrych moved to England.

After the war Ulrych, to support his family, worked in the so-called Silver Brigade, a group of former officials of the Second Polish Republic, who, for lack of other opportunities, cleaned silverware at London's Claridge's Hotel. Later, he worked as a lift operator at Harrods. In ca. 1950, Ulrych was named a consultant at the British War Office. He was actively involved in Polish social life in exile, as deputy chairman of Main Council of Independence League, a pro-Sanacja political organization.

== Death and legacy ==
Juliusz Ulrych died on 31 October 1959 in London at the age of 70. In 1989, his ashes were transported to Warsaw, and buried at the Legions Tomb of the Military Quarter at the Powązki Cemetery. Also, a commemorative plaque dedicated to him was unveiled on a wall of the Lutheran Cemetery in Warsaw.

== Family ==
Ulrych married twice.

In 1920, he married Eugenia née Sztark, and had two children with her. Both died early, and the couple divorced.

His second wife, Zofia née Wilke (d. 2005) settled in Canada, together with their sons Tadeusz (b. 1935) and Andrzej (b. 1934). Tadeusz Ulrych was a renowned geophysics professor at the University of British Columbia in Vancouver, while Andrzej was an entrepreneur.
