= Gustaw Orlicz-Dreszer =

Polish military leader (1889–1936)

Gustaw Konstanty Orlicz-Dreszer
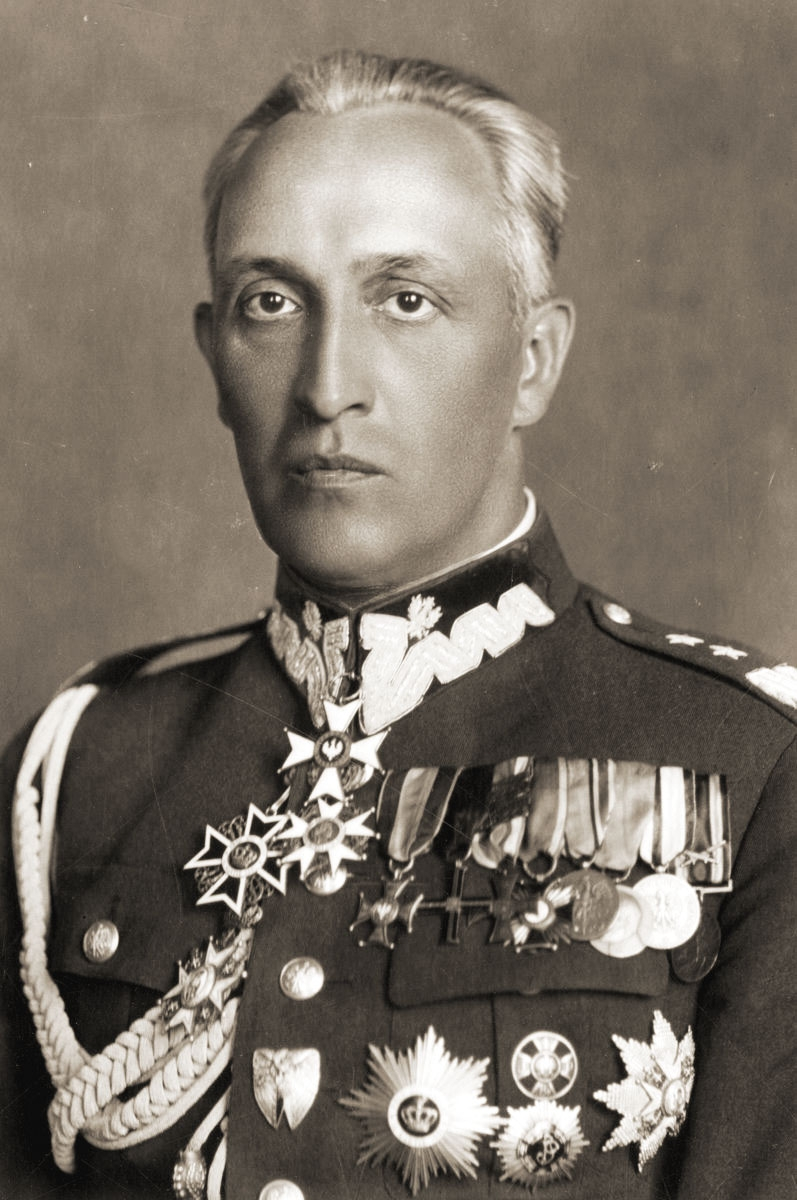
- Born: October 2, 1889; Jadów, Warsaw Governorate, Congress Poland, Russian Empire
- Died: 16 July 1936 (aged 46) near Gdynia, Poland
- Service years: 1914–1936
- Rank: Generał dywizji
- Awards: Virtuti Militari Grand Cross Poloonia Restituta Cross of Independence Cross of Valour 4 times Gold Cross of Merit Commander, Legion of honour

Gustaw Konstanty Orlicz-Dreszer (October 2, 1889 − July 16, 1936) was a Polish general, and a political and social activist.

== Biography ==
Before World War I, Orlicz-Dreszer was involved in pro-independence activities in partitioned Poland. On 3 August 1914, at the outset of the war, he was mobilised as a reserve officer in a Russian hussar regiment. On 14 August, he deserted and crossed the front line. From 1914 to 1917 he served in the 1st Brigade of the Polish Legions. He was arrested during the Oath Crisis. From 1918 he served in the Polish Army.

During the Polish-Soviet War he commanded the 4th Cavalry Brigade and the 2nd Cavalry Division. From 1921 to 1923 he was Cavalry Inspector. In 1923 he was promoted to Brigadier General. In November 1924, he was one of the officers who resigned from active service in the so-called strike of the generals; the joint resignation of the officers was, however, rejected. In 1924−26 he commanded the 2nd and then the 3rd Cavalry Division. During the May 1926 Coup d'État he supported Józef Piłsudski.

In 1930 Orlicz-Dreszer became a member of ZG Liga Morska i Kolonialna (Maritime and Colonial League). He created and promoted a development program for the Polish merchant marine. From 1930 to 1936 he served as Inspector of the Polish Army and in 1936 as Inspector of Air Defense.

Orlicz-Dreszer died in a plane accident, crashing in a RWD-9 plane into the Baltic Sea near Gdynia while flying excessively low.

== Awards ==
- Silver Cross of the Virtuti Militari.
- Grand Cross of the Order of Polonia Restituta (previously awarded the Commander's Cross)
- Cross of Independence with Swords
- Cross of Valour (Krzyż Walecznych), four times
- Gold Cross of Merit
- Commander of the Legion of Honour (France)

== Sources ==
=== Bibliography ===
- Sławomir Koper, Życie prywatne elit Drugiej Rzeczypospolitej, Warszawa 2011
- Dziennik Personalny Ministra Spraw Wojskowych nr 54 z 23.12.1926
- Przemysław Olstowski Generał Gustaw Orlicz-Dreszer, Wyd. Adam Marszałek, Toruń 2000
- Zbigniew Mierzwiński: Generałowie II Rzeczypospolitej. Warszawa 1990: Wydawnictwo Polonia, pages 201-208
- Cezary Leżeński / Lesław Kukawski: O kawalerii polskiej XX wieku. Wrocław: Zakład Narodowy im. Ossolińskich, 1991, page 22
