= 1938 in Poland =

- Decades: 1910s; 1920s; 1930s; 1940s; 1950s
- See also: Other events of 1938; Timeline of Polish history

The following is the list of events of the year 1938 in Poland.

== Incumbents ==
On May 15, 1936, president of Poland Ignacy Mościcki designed the government under prime minister Felicjan Sławoj Składkowski. The government was dissolved on September 30, 1939, and it was the last government of the Second Polish Republic which resided in Warsaw.

=== Members of the government ===
- President of Poland – Ignacy Mościcki,
- Prime Minister – Felicjan Sławoj Składkowski,
- Deputy Prime Minister and Minister of Treasury – Eugeniusz Kwiatkowski,
- Minister of Foreign Affairs – Józef Beck,
- Minister of Justice – Witold Grabowski,
- Minister of Military Affairs – Tadeusz Kasprzycki,
- Minister of Agriculture – Juliusz Poniatowski,
- Minister of Communication – Juliusz Ulrych,
- Minister of Post Office and Telegraphs – Emil Kaliński,
- Minister of Religious Beliefs and Public Enlightenment – Wojciech Świętosławski,
- Minister of Industry and Trade – Antoni Roman.

=== Other personalities ===
- Primate of Poland – August Hlond,
- Eastern Orthodox Church Archbishop of Warsaw – Dionizy (Dionisij, real name Konstantyn Waledynski),
- Chief Rabbi of Warsaw – vacant,
- Marshall of the Sejm – Waclaw Makowski,
- Marshall of the Senat – Boguslaw Miedzinski.

== Events ==
=== January ===
- January 1. In Tarnopol, a process of 51 members of the Communist Party of Western Ukraine ends. Izrael Wuhl is sentenced to 8 years in prison, Himmelstein Szapse – to 6 years. Altogether, 37 persons are sentenced. According to the government's statistics, as for January 1, 1938, there are 44 200 motor vehicles in Poland, including 9876 motorcycles. In 1937, 194,000 tourists visited the Eastern borderlands of Poland, with 66,000 of them visiting Wilno,
- January 3. The Polish Road Congress begins at the Warsaw University of Technology. In Daugavpils, the 18th anniversary of the city's capturing by forces of the Polish Army under Edward Rydz-Śmigły is celebrated (see: Battle of Daugavpils),
- January 11. General Stanisław Skwarczyński officially becomes leader of the Camp of National Unity,
- January 13. Minister Józef Beck leaves Warsaw for the session of the League of Nations in Geneva, via Berlin,
- January 15. Launching of the submarine Orzeł in the Dutch port of Vlissingen,
- January 17. German military delegation visits Poland,
- January 22. Professor Edmund Bulanda becomes chancellor of the Jan Kazimierz University in Lwów. On the same day, a meteorological observatory is opened on the Kasprowy Wierch,
- January 26. General Tadeusz Kutrzeba, while presenting a plan of possible military conflict with Nazi Germany, emphasizes that the Wehrmacht is three times stronger than the Polish Army,
- January 28. Józef Beck gives a speech at the League of Nations session in Geneva
- January 29. Empress of Iran, Tadj ol-Molouk, comes to Poland. In southern Poland, in Drohobycz and Boryslaw, violent hurricane destroys several oil rigs,
- January 30. General Felicjan Sławoj Składkowski tours northeastern Poland – counties of Braslaw, Święciany, Dzisna, and Postawy,
- January 31. First Congress of Polish Muslims begins in Wilno.

=== February ===
- February 5. Miklós Horthy comes to Kraków, then goes hunting to Białowieża,
- February 9. Miklós Horthy visits Warsaw,
- February 12. Economic Council of Eastern Lesser Poland is opened in Lwów by voivode Alfred Biłyk,
- February 15. Snowstorms across Poland make railroads impassable,
- February 18. Three members of the Wilno branch of the National Party are incarcerated and sent to the Bereza Kartuska prison,
- February 23. Hermann Göring comes to Poland, and goes hunting to Białowieża,

=== March ===
- March 2. In Kowel, a process of 19 members of the Communist Party of Western Ukraine begins,
- March 5. A ten-day strike in the Warsaw Opera ends,
- March 6. Józef Beck comes to Rome. On the same day in Berlin, Congress of the Union of Poles in Germany begins,
- March 7. In Złoczów, a process of 9 members of the Organization of Ukrainian Nationalists begins. The defendants are accused of killing two Poles. In Rome, Józef Beck dines with Benito Mussolini and Galeazzo Ciano,
- March 10. Herbert Hoover comes to Poland,
- March 11. Herbert Hoover visits the Jagiellonian University in Kraków. A soldier of the Border Defence Corps is killed on the Polish – Lithuanian border by Lithuanian troops,
- March 13. Józef Beck leaves Rome. On the same day in Lutsk, the meeting of the Association of Reserve Officers takes place,
- March 14. Authorities of the Stanisławów Voivodeship close local branches of Ukrainian organizations Sokil and Prosvita,
- March 16. In Warsaw's Royal Castle, Edward Rydz-Śmigły, Felicjan Sławoj Składkowski, Eugeniusz Kwiatkowski, and Józef Beck meet to discuss Polish – Lithuanian conflict,
- March 17. Polish ultimatum to Lithuania. On the same day, textile workers of Łódź and surrounding towns declare a warning strike,
- March 18. In Wilno and Warsaw, thousands of inhabitants take part in an anti-Lithuanian demonstration. Among Polish officials present at the demonstration in Wilno, is the commander-in-chief of the Polish Army, Edward Śmigły-Rydz, who had come to the city by train at 7:45 a.m.,
- March 19. The government of Lithuania accepts Polish ultimatum,
- March 24. In Brzeżany, five members of the Organization of Ukrainian Nationalists are sentenced to several years in prison,
- March 26. Christian merchants of Warsaw present to the Polish Army 40 heavy machine guns (see: National Defence Fund),
- March 27. In Lwów, 27 members of the Communist Party of Western Ukraine are sentenced to several years in prison. Sara Bryn is sentenced to 10 years, Rybka Malinowitzer and Gerdie Zimmer to 7 years, and Dora Eichenbaum to 5 years,
- March 27. In Lwów, and other cities of southern Poland, hundreds of Jewish refugees from Austria arrive (see: Anschluss),
- March 28. Franciszek Charwat arrives in Kaunas as the first Polish diplomatic representative in Lithuania,
- March 30. President Ignacy Mościcki grants amnesty to 134 criminal prisoners. On the same day, Association of Poles in Czechoslovakia issues a statement in which it demands autonomy for the Polish minority of Czechoslovakia. First telephone conversation between Poland and Lithuania takes place,
- March 31. Poland and Lithuania establish diplomatic relationships,

=== April ===
- April 1. Territorial reform of Poland, in which borders of several Western and Central Voivodeships change considerably,
- April 4. A process of 39 Communist activists begins in Warsaw. Prime minister Felicjan Sławoj Składkowski, together with voivode of Lwów, Alfred Biłyk, tour southern Poland – counties of Mielec, Kolbuszowa, Dąbrowa Tarnowska, Brzesko, and Tarnów,
- April 5. Rail communication between Poland and Lithuania is initiated, along with the connection Landwarow – Vievis,
- April 10. In Rawa Ruska county, the police arrest around 70 members of the Organization of Ukrainian Nationalists. Several handguns are confiscated,
- April 11. Demonstrations of Maritime and Colonial League in Polish cities, in which overseas colonies for Poland are demanded,
- April 12. Near Wieluń, a train from Gdynia to Kraków derails, with no casualties,
- April 13. In the Upper-Silesian settlement of Lagiewniki, a Polish streetcar crashes with a German streetcar,
- April 14. Henryk Józewski becomes voivode of the Łódź Voivodeship, while Aleksander Hauke-Nowak becomes voivode of the Wołyń Voivodeship,
- April 18. In Rome, Andrzej Bobola becomes a saint,
- April 19. Inhabitants of Wilno celebrate the 19th anniversary of the city's liberation from the Soviets. Dar Pomorza returns to the port of Gdynia, after a 216-day cruise,
- April 20. The outbreak of an epidemic of typhus in the area of Jaworów. In Wilno, eight students of Jewish high schools are sentenced for membership of communist organizations,
- April 21. Polish mass-media inform that the population of the country is 34,534,000,
- April 23. In Warsaw, 39 communists are sentenced to several years in prison. South of Muszyna, Czechoslovak border guards shoot a Polish balloon Moscice,
- April 24 A general meeting of Camp of National Unity takes place in Katowice,
- April 25. Minister Eugeniusz Kwiatkowski visits Polish Upper Silesia. Local authorities in Wilno allow publication of Lithuanian minority newspapers and magazines,
- April 26. A group of Hitlerjugend attacks a meeting of The Association of Poles in the Free City of Danzig. Airborne and Antigas Defence League has 1,630,000 members,
- April 27. A Polish – British Sea Treaty is signed in London,
- April 30. To prevent street clashes during the International Workers' Day, temporary prohibition is introduced in Warsaw. Across the Nowogródek Voivodeship, construction of 100 Marshall Józef Piłsudski elementary schools begins,

=== May ===
- May 1. Street clashes during celebrations of the Labor Day in such cities, as Kielce, Lwów and Warsaw,
- May 2. Opening of the Poznań International Fair,
- May 9. Gauleiter Albert Forster comes to Poland. He talks with Józef Beck, visits Warsaw, Lwów and Wilno,
- May 10. After the resignation of professor Wladyslaw Szafer, professor Tadeusz Lahr-Splawinski becomes new chancellor of the Jagiellonian University in Kraków,
- May 11. Opening of telephone lines and mail service between Poland and Lithuania,
- May 13. Poland celebrates the third anniversary of the death of Marshall Józef Piłsudski,
- May 15. In Legionowo, balloon "Toruń" sets off to a stratospheric flight,
- May 17. Prime minister Slawoj-Skladkowski meets all Polish voivodes,
- May 19. General meeting of the Camp of National Unity begins in Warsaw,
- May 20 Romanian prime minister, Patriarch Miron Cristea, comes to Poland. A transport of bears from the Soviet Union comes to Białowieża Forest. Some of Josephine Baker's possessions are stolen during her stay in Lwów,
- May 21. Minister Józef Beck leaves Warsaw for Stockholm,
- May 22. A Ukrainian Congress, planned in Lwów to commemorate the 70th anniversary of the creation of Prosvita, is banned by the Polish government. Romanian prime minister visits Kraków. In Warsaw, Polish lawyers present to the army six anti-aircraft guns,
- May 25. Large fires destroy about 100 buildings in two villages near Wilno. In Stockholm, Józef Beck meets Gustaf V. A meeting of Polish Gymnastic Society Sokół, planned in Lwów, is called off,
- May 26. Meeting of Reserve Officers takes place in Lwów, attended by Marshall Edward Rydz-Śmigły. Prime Minister Felicjan Sławoj Składkowski tours Greater Poland,
- May 31. A new ambassador of Romania comes to Warsaw. Works on the Warta – Gopło canal begin in Kujavia.

=== June ===
- June 1. Fire in the biggest Polish glass manufacturer, Kara, in Piotrków Trybunalski. Polish minority parties win local elections in Załozie, garnering almost 11,000 votes,
- June 3. Bolesław Wieniawa-Długoszowski, the new ambassador of Poland in Italy, comes to Rome. Ten people die in a fire near Olkusz. Iron ore deposits are found near Zdołbunów,
- June 7. An extraordinary session of the Sejm begins in Warsaw. A hydrobiological station is opened in Pinsk, as the third one in Poland, after stations in Hel, and at the lake Wigry,
- June 8. A Polish delegation flies to Kaunas, to discuss the opening of air connection between Poland and Lithuania,
- June 9. Two planes of the Luftwaffe enter Polish airspace near Katowice,
- June 10. The whole village of Zaklików near Janów Lubelski is burned in a fire,
- June 11. A train with remains of Saint Andrzej Bobola comes to the border station of Zebrzydowice, greeted by thousands of faithful,
- June 14. Józef Beck visits Tallinn, where he dines with Estonian minister of foreign affairs, Karl Seiter,
- June 15. Józef Beck has breakfast with President of Estonia, Konstantin Päts. The first customs office is opened in Landwarow, on the Polish–Lithuanian border,
- June 19. Marshall Edward Rydz-Śmigły visits Polish Pomerania,
- June 20. A hailstorm destroys crops in Tarnopol Voivodeship. A funeral of Marshall of the Sejm, Stanisław Car, takes place in Warsaw,
- June 21. The school year ends in Poland. Five peasants drown while crossing the Bug in the village of Orla, Brzesc County,
- June 22. Colonel Walery Sławek is elected Marshall of the Sejm. According to government statistics, there are 279,799 registered unemployed in Poland. President Moscicki leaves for vacation in Opatija,
- June 24. A train from Kraków to Lwów derails in Biezanow on the outskirts of Kraków, 25 people are injured. Gdynia is reported to be the biggest port of the Baltic Sea,
- June 28. General Wacław Stachiewicz comes to Riga, on the invitation of Chief of Staff of the Latvian Army, General Marins Hartmanis. According to unofficial sources, there are about 30,000 Gypsies in Poland,
- June 30. General Stachiewicz arrives at Tallinn.

=== July ===
- July 1. Opening of the Polish Radio Station in Baranowicze. A direct air connection between Warsaw and Budapest is opened jointly by LOT Polish Airlines, and Hungarian Airline Malert. A Polish scientific trip sets for Spitsbergen,
- July 2. A new trade treaty between Poland and Germany is signed in Berlin,
- July 3. Marshall Edward Rydz-Śmigły is named an honorary citizen of Wilno,
- July 4. Polish Ministry of Education announces that it plans to open a university in Toruń,
- July 6. A Museum of Crimean Karaites is opened in Troki,
- July 8. A group of Polish parliamentarians demands delegitimization of several pro-Nazi German minority organizations,
- July 9. In Radom, several buildings burn to the ground after a violent thunderstorm,
- July 10. Snow in the Tatras,
- July 11. A train with the coffin of King Stanisław August Poniatowski arrives at the Polish–Soviet border station in Stolpce,
- July 13. Józef Beck comes to Riga, on a plane from Wilno, with a 20-minute break at Kaunas. Flood warning in southern Poland,
- July 14. Józef Beck visits Jelgava, where he dines with Kārlis Ulmanis. Five people die when a car crashes with a train in Sosnowiec. Secret funeral of Stanisław August Poniatowski takes place in his hometown of Wolczyn,
- July 15. The number of bicycles in Poland exceeds one million. A direct air connection between Warsaw and Kaunas is opened. In Trans-Olza, Czechoslovak police arrest a number of Polish-minority activists,
- July 16. Government-sponsored destruction of Eastern Orthodox churches in the eastern part of the Lublin Voivodeship is terminated,
- July 17. Marshall Edward Rydz-Śmigły visits Zamość,
- July 20. Józef Beck visits Free City of Danzig, and Gdynia. Two escapees from a State Political Directorate prison in Minsk cross Polish–Soviet border in the area of Stolpce,
- July 21. Near Pinsk, a skirmish between local police and a group of communists takes place. The communists wanted to illegally cross Polish–Soviet border,
- July 22. Three crew members die in a crash of a Polish Airlines plane near Cernauti.
- July 25. Association of Ukrainian Merchants in Tarnopol announces a project "Ukrainians buy only at Ukrainian stores",
- July 28. After a two-week delay, the Polish government officially informs the public about the funeral of Stanisław August Poniatowski, which took place on July 14,
- July 29. The opening ceremony of Biały Słoń, a campus of the Polish Astronomical and Meteorological Observatory, takes place on the peak of Pip Ivan,
- July 30. Polish press announces that between mid-1935, and mid-1938, only 107 kilometres of concrete roads were built in the whole country.,
- July 31. Józef Beck comes to Copenhagen

=== August ===
- August 2. Three customs offices are opened on the Polish–Lithuanian border. Józef Beck comes to Oslo,
- August 4. Violent thunderstorms attack several counties in Nowogródek Voivodeship,
- August 5. Three Czechoslovak Air Force planes enter Polish airspace near Żywiec. Józef Beck returns to Warsaw after a trip to Scandinavia,
- August 6. Poland celebrates Day of the First Cadre Company,
- August 7. Seventeen people are injured in a rail crash near Sochaczew,
- August 8. Union of Poles in Germany protests against questionnaires, suggested by the Nazi Germany government for the German census. The questionnaires exclude the possibility of stating one's nationality. In Łódź, 1600 tailors go on strike,
- August 9. A delegation of officers of the French Navy comes to Warsaw. In Gdynia, Józef Beck meets with Duff Cooper,
- August 10. Edward Rydz-Śmigły visits Poznań. Polish press informs that Soviet authorities still have not released three young Polish gliders, who had mistakenly landed in the Soviet Union during a storm on June 26, 1938. The whereabouts and the fate of the gliders are unknown,
- August 11. Meeting of General Council of Camp of National Unity begins in Warsaw. Seven children from Kowel county, Volhynia, aged 8–11, died after an explosion of a World War I bomb, found by them in the ground. A fire in the town of Łosice destroys 25% of the buildings,
- August 12. A delegation of three French destroyers, Chacal, Jaguar, and Leopard, leaves Gdynia,
- August 15. The Day of the Polish Soldier is celebrated across the country.
- August 16. The Komintern dissolves the Communist Party of Poland,
- August 17. Polish media inform that Czechoslovak government closed Polish-Czechoslovak border,
- August 18. Works on the Royal Canal begin in Kobryn,
- August 19. Polish press informs that the total cost of Gwiazda Polski's the stratospheric flight is 360,000 zlotys. A record number of tourists comes to Hel for summer vacation,
- August 20. A delegation of Polish Air Force, with General Ludomił Rayski, visits Sofia. Polish government announces plan of construction of a highway from Sandomierz, the capital of the Central Industrial Area, to Warsaw,
- August 22. Polish destroyers Grom and Błyskawica leave naval base in Oksywie for a visit in Copenhagen,
- August 23. Mass anti-German demonstrations in Gdynia, Toruń, and other cities of Polish Pomerania, after a group of Nazi activists from Free City of Danzig threw a Polish railwayman Tadeusz Winnicki under a train, and as a result, the victims' legs were amputated. Sixteen passengers are seriously injured in a bus crash in Ożarów,
- August 24. Polish Government confiscates a letter of Bishop Andrzej Szeptycki, which criticizes destruction of Orthodox churches,
- August 25. Konrad Libicki becomes general manager of Polish Radio. 200 000 pilgrims come to Jasna Góra Monastery for traditional Black Madonna of Częstochowa holiday,
- August 25. MS Sobieski is launched in Newcastle,
- August 30. Two people die when a passenger train derails on the Lublin – Kowel line

=== September ===
- September 1. Two checkpoints are opened along the border with Lithuania. Charles Lindbergh with wife land in Kraków, on his way from Moscow to Prague,
- September 3. Annual Eastern Trade Fair is opened in Lwów,
- September 5. According to government statistics, Gdynia is the most expensive Polish city, while Wilno is the cheapest,
- September 7. Józef Beck leaves Warsaw, and via Berlin goes to Bern, for a session of the League of Nations,
- September 8. Street clashes between Poles and Jews in Lida,
- September 10. Polish press informs that construction of the new rail line, between Polish Upper Silesia, and Volhynia, has already started. The 400-kilometer line will go from Tarnowskie Góry to Lutsk, via Sandomierz, and Stalowa Wola. Three people die in a motorcycle accident near Lwów,
- September 12. Albert William Stevens comes to Zakopane, to witness the stratospheric flight of Gwiazda Polski balloon,
- September 13. Dissolution of the Polish Parliament,
- September 14. In Czortków, a new steel bridge over the Seret is opened,
- September 15. Marshall Edward Rydz-Śmigły visits the Polish Army manoeuvres in Volhynia,
- September 19. In Lutsk, a military parade takes place, to mark the end of the manoeuvres,
- September 20. Additional units of the Polish Army secure Polish-Czechoslovak border,
- September 21. Polish envoy to Prague, Kazimierz Papée, demands from government of Czechoslovakia solution of the problem of its Polish minority in the same way as the problem of German minority was solved,
- September 22. In Trans-Olza, local Poles fight with Czechoslovak police and army during street manifestations which demand the cession of the area to Poland. On the same day in Warsaw, 250 000 people demand the cession of Trans-Olza. It is the biggest demonstration of the Second Polish Republic,
- September 23. The Soviet government states that if Polish troops enter Czechoslovakia, Moscow will void the Soviet–Polish Non-Aggression Pact,
- September 24. At Warsaw's Royal Castle, the meeting of key Polish figures (Józef Beck, Edward Rydz-Śmigły, Ignacy Mościcki, Felicjan Sławoj Składkowski) takes place, during which the situation in Czechoslovakia is discussed,
- September 25. In Zaleszczyki, a bridge over the Dniester, connecting Poland and Romania, is opened,
- September 26. A LOT plane from Warsaw to Budapest is not allowed to fly over Czechoslovak territory. A clash between Czech soldiers and Poles from Trans-Olza takes place near Zebrzydowice,
- September 27. A demonstration in Cieszyn, during which local Poles demand the cession of Trans-Olza. Construction of a car factory begins in Lublin,
- September 28. Land communication between Poland and Czechoslovakia is closed,
- September 30. Polish government demands the cession of Trans-Olza.

=== October ===
- October 1. Czechoslovak government agrees to Polish demands, and Trans-Olza is ceded to Poland, and demonstrations take place in several Polish cities,
- October 2. Units of the Polish Army's Independent Operational Group Silesia, under General Władysław Bortnowski enter Český Těšín,
- October 4. Polish Army enters Třinec and Jablunkov,
- October 6. Polish press speculates about possible creation of Zaolzie Voivodeship, which besides Trans-Olza, would include counties from Lesser Poland and Polish Upper Silesia,
- October 7. Annual Wine Harvest Festival ends in Zaleszczyki,
- October 8. Polish Army enters Fryštát,
- October 10. Polish Army enters Bohumín and Karviná. Minister Józef Beck visits Trans-Olza. Ten new elementary schools are opened in Polesie,
- October 11. Upon decree of President Ignacy Mościcki, Trans-Olza becomes part of Poland's Autonomous Silesian Voivodeship. Polish press speculates about annexation of Spiš, and Orava – altogether 2,400 km^{2}, with 120,000 inhabitants.
- October 12. Józef Beck is awarded Order of the White Eagle, by President Ignacy Mościcki. Marshall Rydz-Śmigły visits Trans-Olza,
- October 13. In Lwów, Ukrainian rally takes place, followed by Polish counter-demonstration,
- October 14. Unsuccessful stratospheric flight of the Gwiazda Polski balloon. Plans of construction of a motorway Warsaw – Łódź are announced,
- October 29. Nazi Germany government expels some 12,000–17,000 Jews with Polish citizenship to Poland,

=== November ===
- November 1. Upon decree of the President of Poland, Jaworzyna and parts of Spiš become part of Poland,
- November 3. A new, concrete road between Pinsk and Kobryn is opened, after four years of construction,
- November 4. Due to lack of passengers, all domestic LOT Polish Airlines are closed for the winter, except for the connection Warsaw – Poznań,
- November 5. In Prague, a joint Polish-Czechoslovak commission draws the new border between the two countries, in the area of Jaworzyna,
- November 6. General election in Poland,
- November 8. Rail communication between Poland and Czechoslovakia is reestablished. Sun eclipse in Kraków,
- November 8 to November 11. Polish legislative election,
- November 11. Independence Day in Poland. Patriotic demonstrations take place across the country, including Trans-Olza and Lwów,
- November 12. Local floods in Kaszuby and in the area of Nowogródek,
- November 15. Polish press informs that construction of main west–east rail line (Upper Silesia – Volhynia) proceeds according to plan,
- November 16. In Warsaw, leaders of the Jewish minority in Poland declare a month of mourning, protesting against the persecution of Jews in Germany,
- November 17. SS Pulaski returns to Gdynia from a cruise to South America,
- November 19. Residents of Lwów celebrate 20th anniversary of Battle of Lwów (1918),
- November 23. Around 6,000 Jewish refugees, expelled from Nazi Germany, are housed at a transit camp in Zbąszyń, a town on the Polish-German border. Council of Ministers of the Republic of Poland accepts construction of two rail lines, Tarnowskie Góry – Zawiercie, and Skierniewice – Łuków,
- November 24. All Freemasons Lodges in Poland are closed by the President of Poland. Prime Minister Felicjan Sławoj-Składkowski hands his resignation to the president Ignacy Mościcki, and Mościcki does not accept it,
- November 26. Joseph Stalin reaffirms the Soviet–Polish Non-Aggression Pact. Polish envoy to Czechoslovakia, Kazimierz Papée protests against the attack of armed Czechoslovak citizens on Polish soldiers establishing a new border in the area of Čadca,
- November 27. Polish Army troops seize Jaworzyna,
- November 28. Sejm and Senate convene in Warsaw for the first time after the election,
- November 29. Opening of a 22-kilometer rail line Żory–Pszczyna,
- November 30. Polish press informs that only 30 citizens of Poland own their private aeroplanes.

=== December ===
- December 2. Speaking in Sejm, Minister Eugeniusz Kwiatkowski describes a plan of development of Poland for the years 1939–1954,
- December 5. Speaker of Polish Parliament, Vasyl Mudry of Ukrainian minority demands in his parliamentary speech autonomy for the Ukrainians. In the port of Danzig, Polish ship SS Tczew sinks and two people die,
- December 8. Three people die in a car crash near Gniezno,
- December 9. In Warsaw, a delegation of Polish civil servants and bank workers presents to the Army a PZL.37 Łoś, purchased with the money collected by them,
- December 10. Deposits of copper are found in Podolia, near Zaleszczyki and Horodenka,
- December 12. A movie theatre burns down in Gdynia,
- December 13. Papal Nuncio Filippo Cortesi comes to Lwów. A seismic observatory of Warsaw University is opened in Warsaw,
- December 16. According to the Polish press, there still are around 5,700 Jews, camping in Zbąszyń on the Polish-German border. A cold wave sweeps over Poland, the temperature in Lwów goes down to minus 21 degrees C,
- December 18. Local elections in several Polish cities,
- December 19. Three miners die in coal mine Kazimierz in Sosnowiec. A new rail and road bridge over the Vistula is opened in Płock,
- December 21. Tatra Park of Nature is opened in Jaworzyna,
- December 22. The Polish ambassador in Berlin, Józef Lipski, meets with Joachim von Ribbentrop,
- December 24. Fire in the left wing of the Nieśwież Castle. Primate of Poland August Hlond addresses the nation through the radio,
- December 27. SS Tczew, which sank in Danzig on December 5 is raised and transported to Gdynia for overhaul. Residents of Greater Poland celebrate 20th anniversary of Greater Poland Uprising,
- December 28. Four people die hit by a train on a railroad crossing in Żyrardów,
- December 29. Construction of rail line Tarnobrzeg–Kolbuszowa–Rzeszów begins,
- December 30. The flu epidemic in Poland; in Warsaw 130,000 people are sick. Archbishop Aleksander Kakowski dies in Warsaw,

== Arts and literature ==
=== Books ===
- Bunt Rojstów by Józef Mackiewicz,
- Ład serca, a novel by Jerzy Andrzejewski,
- first edition of Witold Gombrowicz's Ferdydurke, even though published in October 1937, is dated 1938,
- Iwona, księżniczka Burgunda, by Witold Gombrowicz, published in parts in 1938 in literary magazine Skamander,
- Krzyk ostateczny, a poetry bundle by Władysław Broniewski, published in Warsaw,
- Równanie serca, a poetry bundle by Julian Przyboś,
- Rozmowa z Apollinem, a poetry bundle by Anatol Stern.

=== Film ===
- Florian, directed by Leonard Buczkowski, based on a book by Maria Rodziewiczówna. Released October 28, 1938,
- Granica, based on a book by Zofia Nałkowska, directed by Józef Lejtes. Featuring Mieczysława Ćwiklińska and Elżbieta Barszczewska, the movie was released October 29, 1938,
- Kościuszko pod Racławicami, directed by Józef Lejtes and released January 1, 1938,
- Paweł i Gaweł, based on Aleksander Fredro's tale, featuring Eugeniusz Bodo and Adolf Dymsza, directed by Mieczysław Krawicz. Released September 15, 1938,
- Ostatnia brygada, based on a book by Tadeusz Dołęga-Mostowicz. Directed by Michał Waszyński, and released September 20, 1938,
- Profesor Wilczur, based on a book by Tadeusz Dołęga-Mostowicz. Directed by Michał Waszyński, released October 18, 1938,
- Rena, directed by Michał Waszyński, released December 22, 1938,
- Zapomniana melodia, a music comedy directed by Konrad Tom and Jan Fethke, with music by Henryk Wars and Ludwik Starski.

== Sports ==
=== January ===
- January 2. Boxers of Warta Poznań become team champions of Poland,
- January 9. In Warsaw, the reserve ice hockey team of Poland beats Latvia 2–1,
- January 16. In Warsaw, in an international boxing match, Poland beats Italy 11–5,
- January 19. In Bern, Polish national ice hockey team beats Switzerland 1–0,
- January 22. In Brzesc nad Bugiem, AZS Warszawa becomes a women's volleyball champion of Poland. Second is HKS Łódź, third Olsza Kraków,
- January 30. Stanisław Marusarz wins a ski-jumping tournament in Garmisch-Partenkirchen.

=== February ===
- February 2. International Skiing Championships of Poland begin in Zakopane,
- February 3. In Łódź, AZS Wilno becomes a men's volleyball champion of Poland. Second is AZS Warszawa, third Polonia Warszawa,
- February 6. In Poznań, the team of AZS Poznań becomes both men's and women's track and field champion of Poland,
- February 12. In Prague, in the 1938 World Ice Hockey Championships, Poland beats Lithuania 8–1,
- February 13. In Poznań, in international boxing match, Poland (with Antoni Czortek, Henryk Chmielewski, and Antoni Kolczyński) beats Germany 10–6. In Prague, in the 1938 World Ice Hockey Championships, Poland beats Romania 3–0,
- February 14. In the 1938 World Ice Hockey Championships, Poland beats Hungary 3–0,
- February 15. In the 1938 World Ice Hockey Championships, Poland loses to Switzerland 1–7,
- February 16. In Warsaw, Michal Offierski, a pilot from Katowice, breaks the world height gliding record, reaching 4 595 meters,
- February 17. In the 1938 World Ice Hockey Championships, Poland loses to Sweden 0–1,
- February 18. In the 1938 World Ice Hockey Championships, Poland loses to Great Britain 1–7,
- February 20. In Chorzów, in an international wrestling match, Poland loses to Germany 3-20,
- February 27. In Lahti, Stanisław Marusarz becomes ski jumping vice-champion of the world.

=== March ===
- March 6. In Łódź, swimmers of EKS Katowice become winter team champions of Poland,
- March 11. Jadwiga Jędrzejowska wins a tennis tournament in Monte Carlo,
- March 13. In Zürich, the football team of Poland ties 3–3 in international friendly with Switzerland. Goals for Poland are scored by Ernest Wilimowski, Jerzy Wostal, and Leonard Piątek,
- March 19. Wrestling and weight-lifting championships of Poland take place in Katowice,
- March 20. In Helsinki, boxing team of Poland beats Finland 10–6,
- March 22. In Tallinn, boxing team of Poland beats Estonia 12–4,
- March 27. Cracovia becomes a men's basketball champion of Poland. Second is AZS Poznań,

=== April ===
- April 3. In Belgrade, the football team of Yugoslavia beats Poland 1–0. However, since in the first leg (Warsaw, October 10, 1937), Poland won 4–0, the Poles win the qualifiers to the 1938 FIFA World Cup in France. In Ruda Śląska, the weight-lifting team of Latvia beats Poland,
- April 10. In Budapest, Polish boxers tie with Hungary 8-8. In the first games of the 1938 season of the Ekstraklasa, Ruch Chorzów beats at home Śmigły Wilno 5-2 (att. 3000), Warta Poznań routs at home Polonia Warszawa 7-1 (att. 2500), Pogoń Lwów beats at home Cracovia 2-1 (att. 4000), Warszawianka Warszawa beats at home ŁKS Łódź 4-1 (att. 2000), and Wisła Kraków ties at home with AKS Chorzów 0-0 (att. 6000). In Lutsk, Józef Noji becomes the 10,000-meter cross country running champion of Poland,
- April 16. During Easter holidays, a number of foreign teams visit Poland. VfB Stuttgart ties 0–0 with AKS Chorzów, and loses 0–1 to Ruch Chorzów. ŁKS Łódź ties 2–2 with Nemzeti Budapest, Polonia Warszawa loses to Nemzeti 0–3, Kispesti Budapest beats Wisła Kraków 3–1, and ties 2–2 with Cracovia. Pogoń Lwów ties 1–1 with Budafok Budapest, and Warta Poznań twice beats 3–2, 2-1 Phoebus Budapest,
- April 24. In games of the Ekstraklasa, Cracovia Kraków beats at home Warta Poznań 5-2 (att. 3000), ŁKS Łódź ties at home with Wisła Kraków 0-0, Polonia Warszawa loses at home to Ruch Chorzów 0-3 (att. 5000), AKS Chorzów beats in Chorzów Warszawianka Warszawa 3–0, and Śmigły Wilno loses at home to Pogoń Lwów 0-1 (att. 5000). In international lawn tennis game in Warsaw, Poland beats Germany 6–1,

=== May ===
- May 1. In games of the Polish Football League, Śmigły Wilno beats at home AKS Chorzów 3-1 (att. 5000), Pogoń Lwów beats at home ŁKS Łódź 1-0 (att. 4000), Wisła Kraków ties with Cracovia 2-2 (att. 8000), Ruch Chorzów beats at home Warta Poznań 3-2 (att. 5000) and Warszawianka Warszawa beats Polonia Warszawa 3-1 (att. 7000),
- May 3. In several Polish cities and towns, the National Running Day is celebrated to commemorate the Polish Constitution. The biggest runs take place in Poznań and Slonim. Polish national soccer team leaves Poland, heading to Strasbourg for a World Cup game vs Brazil,
- May 8. In Katowice, in the Davis Cup game, Poland beats Denmark 5–0. In games of the Ekstraklasa, Ruch Chorzów beats at home Warszawianka Warszawa 6-2 (att. 5000), Cracovia beats at home Śmigły Wilno 3-0 (att. 7000), ŁKS Łódź beats at home AKS Chorzów 2-1 (att. 5000), Warta Poznań beats at home Wisła Kraków 6–2, and Polonia Warszawa beats in Warsaw Pogoń Lwów 1-0 (att. 7000),
- May 15. In the games of the Ekstraklasa, Warszawianka Warszawa beats at home Śmigły Wilno 6-2 (att. 4000), ŁKS Łódź beats at home Polonia Warszawa 4-3 (att. 5000), AKS Chorzów routs in Chorzów the team of Cracovia 5-1 (att. 15 000), Pogoń Lwów ties at home with Warta Poznań 1-1 (att. 6000), and Wisła Kraków beats in Kraków Ruch Chorzów 3-1 (att. 7000),
- May 18. In Chorzów, in a friendly game, the team of Polish Upper Silesia ties 4–4 with Wolverhampton Wanderers F.C. Attendance: 35 000, goals for the Silesians – Ernest Wilimowski – 3, Gerard Wodarz – 1,
- May 22. In an international football friendly, Poland beats in Warsaw Ireland 6-0 (att. 20 000),
- May 25. In Milan, Italy beats Poland 3–2 in the second round of the Davis Cup,
- May 26. In games of the Ekstraklasa, Śmigły Wilno beats at home Wisła Kraków 1-0 (att. 3000), Warszawianka Warszawa beats in Warsaw Pogoń Lwów 2-0 (att. 1500), Ruch Chorzów beats at home AKS Chorzów 3-2 (att. 13 000), Warta Poznań beats at home ŁKS Łódź 6–2, and Cracovia Kraków beats in Kraków Polonia Warszawa 3–2,
- May 27. The national football team of Poland begins a training camp in Wągrowiec, preparing for the 1938 FIFA World Cup in France,

=== June ===
- June 5. In Strasbourg, in a 1938 FIFA World Cup match, Poland loses to Brazil 5-6 (see also Poland v Brazil (1938)),
- June 11. In Rome, Italian wrestling team beats Poland 6–1,
- June 12. In games of the Ekstraklasa, AKS Chorzów beats at home Warta Poznań 4–0, ŁKS Łódź loses in Łódź to Cracovia 0–1, Pogoń Lwów beats at home Ruch Chorzów 3-1 (att. 6000), Wisła Kraków beats in Kraków Warszawianka Warszawa 3–1, and Polonia Warszawa beats at home Śmigły Wilno 5–2. In Budapest, Hungary beats Poland 13–7, in an international handball game. In Poznań, in a rowing competition, Poland loses to Germany 25–47,
- June 15. In Poznań, Polish boxing team beats France 14 -2,
- June 19. In games of the Ekstraklasa, Warta Poznań ties at home 3–3 with Warszawianka (att. 4000), Ruch Chorzów beats at home Cracovia 4-0 (att. 10 000), ŁKS Łódź ties at home with Śmigły Wilno 1-1 (att. 4000), and Wisła Kraków beats in Kraków Pogoń Lwów 1-0 (att. 3000). In international track and field-friendly, Poland beats France 119,5 – 91,5. Ignacy Tłoczyński becomes lawn tennis champion of Poland, after beating Jozef Hebda,
- June 26. In games of the Ekstraklasa, Cracovia beats at home Ruch Chorzów 3-2 (att. 7000), in Chorzów AKS beats Polonia Warszawa 1-0 (att. 6000), in Wilno, Śmigły beats ŁKS Łódź 4-0 (att. 4000), in Lwów Pogon beats Wisła Kraków 2–1, and in Warsaw, Warszawianka beats Warta Poznań 2-1 (att. 4000). KPW Poznań becomes handball champion of Poland, 2nd is AZS Warszawa, 3rd Cracovia, and 4th ŁKS Łódź.

=== July ===
- July 16. Swimming championships of Poland begin in Bielsko-Biała,
- July 17. Quarterfinal games of the President of Poland's Football Cup take place in four cities,
- July 29. International female lawn tennis match Poland – Czechoslovakia begins in Warsaw,

=== August ===
- August 1. In a two-day track and field match in Cernauti, Poland beats Romania 96 – 48. In a friendly football match, Ruch Chorzów beats at home SK Jugoslavija 5–2,
- August 2. In a friendly football match, SK Jugoslavija beats ŁKS Łódź 2–0,
- August 3. In a friendly football game in Warsaw, Poland loses to Hungaria Budapest 1-3 (att. 6000),
- August 5. In a friendly football match in Łódź, Poland beats Hungaria Budapest 1–0,
- August 7. In an international boxing match in Venice, Poland loses to Italy 4–12. In semifinal games of President of Poland's Football Cup, Lwów beats at home Łódź 3–2, and Kraków beats Warsaw 3-2 (in Warsaw). Syrena Warsaw becomes team cycling champion of Poland,
- August 10. In an international track and field match in Oslo, Poland beats Norway 95–93. In Rimini, Poland ties 8–8 with Italy, in the second leg of a boxing match,
- August 21. In games of the Ekstraklasa, Warta Poznań beats at home AKS Chorzów 4–3, Cracovia beats ŁKS Łódź 6–2, Wisła Kraków beats Warszawianka Warszawa 3–2, Polonia Warszawa beats Śmigły Wilno 3–0, and Ruch Chorzów beats Pogoń Lwów 3–1,
- August 28. In games of the Ekstraklasa, Pogoń Lwów beats at home Warszawianka Warszawa 3-0 (att. 5000), Wisła Kraków beats at home Śmigły Wilno 4-1 (att. 4000), Ruch Chorzów beats away AKS Chorzów 4-2 (att. 12 000), in Łódź, ŁKS Łódź ties 0–0 with Warta Poznań, and in Warsaw, Polonia Warszawa ties 2–2 with Cracovia (att. 5000),
- August 29. In an international lawn tennis game in Žilina, Czechoslovakia ties 3–3 with Poland. In games of the Ekstraklasa, ŁKS Łódź ties with Warta Poznań 0-0, Ruch Chorzów beats at home AKS Chorzów 4-2 (att. 15 000), Pogoń Lwów beats Warszawianka Warszawa 3-0 (att. 3500), Wisła Kraków beats Śmigły Wilno 4–1, and Cracovia ties with Polonia Warszawa 2-2. In qualifiers to the Ekstraklasa, Garbarnia Kraków beats at home Union Touring Łódź 2–1, and in Luck, local team PKS loses to Śląsk Świętochłowice 1-4 (att. 3000),

=== September ===
- September 4. In games of the Ekstraklasa, Warta Poznań beats at home Pogoń Lwów 2-0 (att. 6000), Ruch Chorzów beats at home Wisła Kraków 4–2, Polonia Warszawa beats at home ŁKS Łódź 2–1, Cracovia beats at home AKS Chorzów 4-2 (att. 8000), and Śmigły Wilno beats at home Warszawianka Warszawa 4–1. On the same day in Milan, Roger Verey wins silver in the Rowing Championships of Europe,
- September 11. In games of the Ekstraklasa, Ruch Chorzów beats in Warsaw Warszawianka Warszawa 4-1 (att. 10 000), Pogoń Lwów loses at home to Polonia Warszawa 1–3, in Wilno, Śmigły Wilno loses to Cracovia 1-3 (att. 6000), in Kraków, Warta Poznań beats Wisła Kraków 7-5 (att. 3000), and in Chorzów, AKS Chorzów beats ŁKS Łódź 3–2,
- September 18. In a friendly football game in Chemnitz, German beats Poland 4–1,
- September 25. In international football games, Poland A ties 4–4 with Yugoslawia (in Warsaw), and Poland B loses in Riga to Latvia 1–2,

=== October ===
- October 2. In games of the Ekstraklasa, Polonia Warszawa beats at home Warszawianka Warszawa 5-2 (att. 7000), AKS Chorzów routs at home Śmigły Wilno 7-1 (att. 2500), ŁKS Łódź beats at home Pogoń Lwów (att. 2000), Cracovia beats at home Wisła Kraków 2-1 (att. 8000), and Warta Poznań routs at home Ruch Chorzów 6-0 (att. 6000). On the same day, Garbarnia Kraków and Union Touring Łódź win playoffs to the Ekstraklasa,
- October 9. In games of the Ekstraklasa, Warszawianka Warszawa beats at home Cracovia 2-0 (att. 3000), Ruch Chorzów beats at home ŁKS Łódź 5-0 (att. 2000), Śmigły Wilno loses at home to Warta Poznań 0-1 (att. 3000), Pogoń Lwów beats at home AKS Chorzów 1–0, and Wisła Kraków beats at home Polonia Warszawa 4-2 (att. 3000). After a series of playoffs, Garbarnia Kraków and Union Touring Łódź are promoted to Ekstraklasa,
- October 12. Stanislawa Walasiewiczowna leaves Gdynia for New York City,
- October 30. In last games of the 1938 season of the Ekstraklasa, Warszawianka Warszawa loses at home to AKS Chorzów 0-3 (att. 2000), Wisła Kraków routs at home ŁKS Łódź 7-3 (att. 2000), Ruch Chorzów beats at home Polonia Warszawa 3–2, Pogoń Lwów beats at home Śmigły Wilno 3-2 (att. 4000), and in Poznań, Warta Poznań routs Cracovia 7-1 (att. 5000). Ruch Chorzów becomes the 1938 Football Champion of Poland, demoted are the teams of Śmigły Wilno and ŁKS Łódź.

=== November ===
- November 1. In a postponed game of the Ekstraklasa, Cracovia loses at home to Polonia Warszawa 0-2 (att. 4000),
- November 5. In Poznań, Poland loses to Italy 1–6 in a wrestling match,
- November 13. In international football game, which takes place in Dublin, Poland loses to Ireland 2–3, with goals by Ernest Wilimowski and Leonard Piątek. In Breslau, in a double boxing game, Germany beats Poland 12–4. In Toruń, Polish "B" boxing team beats Latvia 12–4,
- Final matches of Polish boxing championship begin, with such teams, as Elektrit Wilno, IKP Łódź, Lechia Lwów, Okęcie Warszawa, Wisła Kraków, LSW Lublin, HCP Poznań, Goplania Inowrocław, Warta Poznań, Strzelec Janowa Dolina and IKB Świętochłowice. The championship is won by Warta Poznań,
- November 27. In Lwów, in the final game of the President of Poland's Football Cup, Lwów beats Kraków 5–1,

=== December ===
- December 4. In a football friendly, the team of Breslau beats at home the team of Warsaw 2–0,
- December 8. In an international boxing friendly in Warsaw, Poland beats Switzerland 12–4,
- December 11. In an international boxing match in Łódź, Poland beats Estonia 10–6,
- December 19. In Katowice, ice-hockey tournament of four cities (Katowice, Kraków, Vienna and Berlin) takes place. The tournament is won by Kraków,
- December 26. Games of Polish ice-hockey championship begin,

== Births ==
- February 4, Halina Górecka, Olympic sprinter.
- April 17, Adam Gierek, politician.
- May 14, Elżbieta Czyżewska, actress.
- June 26, Krzysztof Baranowski, yachtsman.
- July 12, Horst Panic, football player and manager.
- August 15, Janusz Zajdel, writer
- August 28, Józef Kowalczyk, Roman Catholic prelate.
- September 13, Janusz Głowacki, writer.
- September 22, Aleksander Gudzowaty, businessman.
- October 1, Andrzej Paczkowski, historian.
- December 7, Andrzej Czuma, politician.
- December 16, Zbigniew Religa, cardiac surgeon and politician.

== Deaths ==
- January 22, Gabriel Czechowicz,
- February 10, Aleksander Majkowski,
- February 11, Kazimierz Twardowski,
- April 23, Stefan Drzewiecki,
- August 26, Teodor Axentowicz,
- September 17, Bruno Jasieński,
- October 5, Mary Faustina Kowalska,
- October 13, Władysław Belina-Prażmowski,
- October 17, Aleksander Michałowski,
- December 4, Tomasz Dąbal, Józef Teodorowicz,
- December 30, Aleksander Kakowski,
