= Sahaidachnyi =

Sahaidachnyi is a Ukrainian surname. It may refer to:

- Petro Konashevych-Sahaidachny (c. 1582–1622), Ukrainian political, civic, and military leader
- Ukrainian frigate Hetman Sahaydachniy, a frigate of the Ukrainian Navy
- Hetman Petro Sahaidachnyi National Ground Forces Academy in Lviv, Ukraine
- Hetman Sahaidachny, a racing yacht
