= Lwów Voivodeship =

Former voivodeship of Poland

Coordinates: 49°50′05″N 24°01′41″E

Lwów Voivodeship Województwo lwowskie
- Voivodeship of Poland
- 1920–1939
- Coat of arms

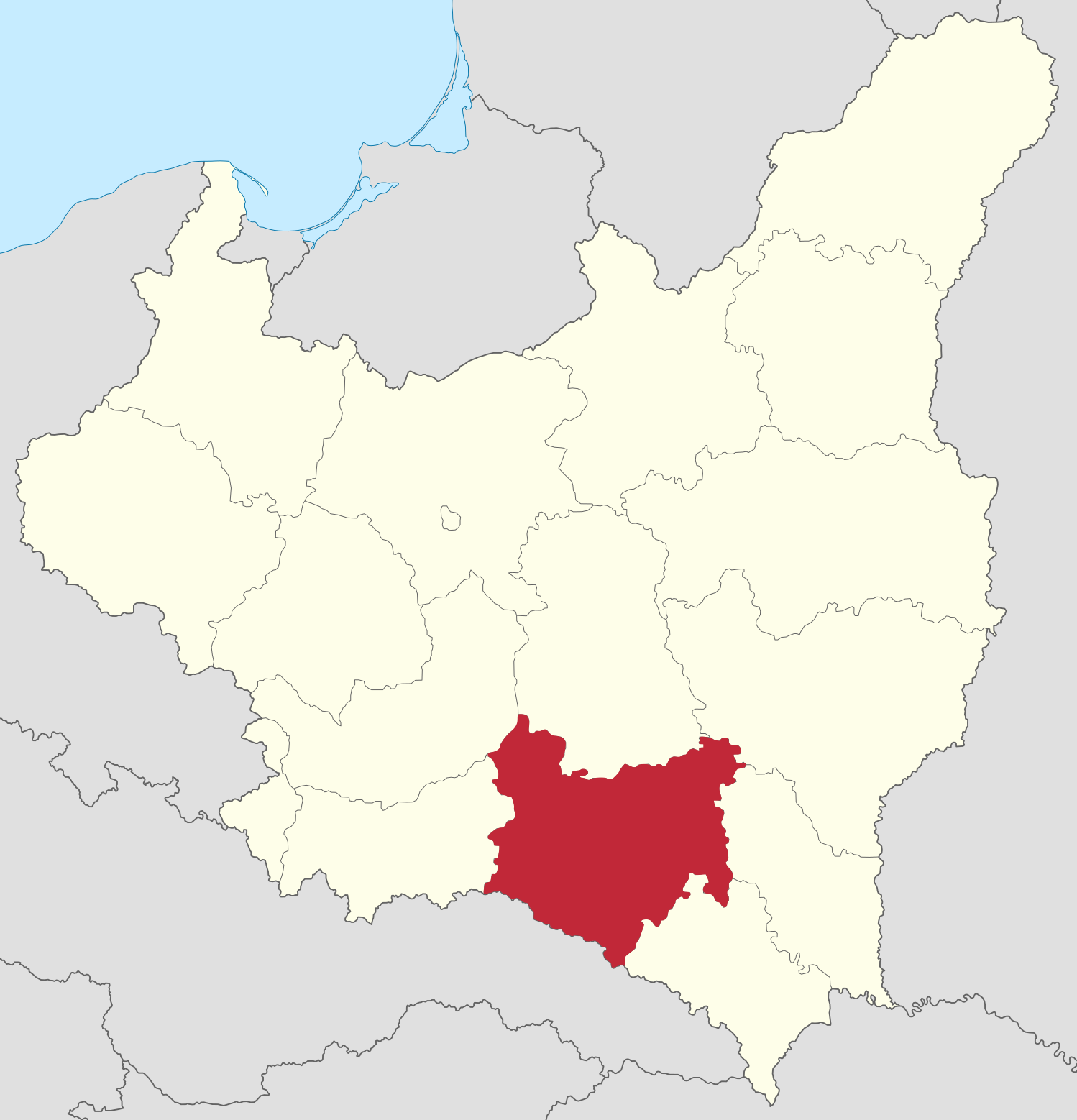
- Lwów Voivodeship (red) on the map of Second Polish Republic
- Capital: Lwów
- Area
  - 1921: 27,024 km^{2} (10,434 sq mi)
  - 1939: 28,402 km^{2} (10,966 sq mi)
- Population
  - 1921: 2.718.014
  - 1931: 3.126.300
- Government
  - Type: Voivodeship
- Voivodes
  - 1921–1924: Kazimierz Grabowski
  - 1937–1939: Alfred Biłyk
- Historical era: Interwar period
  - Established: 23 December 1920
  - Annexed and divided: September 1939
- Political subdivisions: 27 powiats
Preceded by	Succeeded by
Kingdom of Galicia and Lodomeria	Ukraine SSR; General Government
- Today part of: Ukraine, Poland

Lwów Voivodeship (Polish: Województwo lwowskie) was an administrative unit of interwar Poland (1918–1939). Because of the Nazi invasion of Poland in accordance with the secret Molotov–Ribbentrop Pact, it became occupied by both the Wehrmacht and the Red Army in September 1939. Following the conquest of Poland however, the Polish underground administration existed there until August 1944. Only around half of the Voivodeship was returned to Poland after the war ended. It was split diagonally just east of Przemyśl; with its eastern half, including Lwów itself, ceded to the Ukrainian SSR at the insistence of Joseph Stalin during the Tehran Conference confirmed (as not negotiable) at the Yalta Conference of 1945.

== Population ==
The Voivodeship's capital, biggest and most important city was Lwów. It consisted of 27 powiats (counties), 58 towns and 252 villages. In 1921 it was inhabited by 2,789,000 people. Ten years later, this number rose to 3,126,300 (which made it the most populous of all Polish Voivodeships). In 1931, the population density was 110 per km^{2}. The majority of the population (57%) was Polish, especially in western counties. Ukrainians (mainly in the east and south-east) made up about 33% and Jews (mainly in towns) - around 7%. Also, there were smaller communities of Armenians, Germans and other nationalities. In 1931, the illiteracy rate of the Voivodeship's population was 23.1%, about the same as national average and, at the same time, the lowest in the Polish Eastern Borderlands.

According to the census of 1921 the Lwów Voivodeship was inhabited by 2,718,014 people, of whom by nationality 56.6% were Polish, 35.9% were Ruthenian (Ukrainian), 7.0% were Jewish and 0.5% were German and all others. By religion 46.5% were Roman Catholic, 41.5% were Uniate or Orthodox, 0.5% were Protestant and 11.5% were Jewish.

In 1931 the voivodeship had 3,127,409 inhabitants, of whom by mother tongue 57.7% spoke Polish, 34.1% spoke Ukrainian and Ruthenian, 7.5% spoke Yiddish or Hebrew, 0.4% spoke German and 0.3% spoke other languages. By religion, 46.3% were Roman Catholic, 42% were Greek Catholic or Orthodox, 0.4% were Protestant, 11% were Jewish and 0.3% others.

The results of the 1931 census (questions about mother tongue and about religion) are presented in the table below:

Ukrainian/Ruthenian and Greek Catholic/Orthodox majority minority counties are highlighted with yellow.

Comparison of Polish and Ukrainian population of Lwów Voivodeship according to the 1931 census
Today part of	County	Pop.	Polish	%	Ukrainian & Ruthenian	%	Roman Catholic	%	Uniate & Orthodox	%
(Ukraine)	Bibrka	97124	30762	31.7%	60444	62.2%	22820	23.5%	66113	68.1%
(Poland)	Brzozów	83205	68149	81.9%	10677	12.8%	65813	79.1%	12743	15.3%
(Ukraine)	Dobromyl	93970	35945	38.3%	52463	55.8%	25941	27.6%	59664	63.5%
(Ukraine)	Drohobych	194456	91935	47.3%	79214	40.7%	52172	26.8%	110850	57.0%
(Ukraine)	Horodok	85007	33228	39.1%	47812	56.2%	22408	26.4%	56713	66.7%
(Poland)	Jarosław	148028	120429	81.4%	20993	14.2%	83652	56.5%	52302	35.3%
(Ukraine)	Yavoriv	86762	26938	31.0%	55868	64.4%	18394	21.2%	62828	72.4%
(Poland)	Kolbuszowa	69565	65361	94.0%	62	0.1%	63999	92.0%	91	0.1%
(Poland)	Krosno	113387	93691	82.6%	14666	12.9%	91189	80.4%	15132	13.3%
(Poland)	Lesko	111575	31840	28.5%	70346	63.0%	18209	16.3%	81588	73.1%
(Poland)	Lubaczów	87266	43294	49.6%	38237	43.8%	32994	37.8%	44723	51.2%
(Ukraine)	Lviv City	312231	198212	63.5%	35137	11.3%	157490	50.4%	50824	16.3%
(Ukraine)	Lviv County	142800	80712	56.5%	58395	40.9%	67430	47.2%	67592	47.3%
(Poland)	Łańcut	97679	92084	94.3%	2690	2.8%	86066	88.1%	4806	4.9%
(Ukraine)	Mostyska	89460	49989	55.9%	37196	41.6%	34619	38.7%	49230	55.0%
(Poland)	Nisko	64233	60602	94.3%	115	0.2%	59069	92.0%	925	1.4%
(Poland)	Przemyśl	162544	86393	53.2%	60005	36.9%	67068	41.3%	73631	45.3%
(Poland)	Przeworsk	61388	58634	95.5%	406	0.7%	54833	89.3%	3042	5.0%
(Ukraine)	Rava-Ruska	122072	27376	22.4%	82133	67.3%	22489	18.4%	84808	69.5%
(Ukraine)	Rudky	79170	38417	48.5%	36254	45.8%	27674	35.0%	45756	57.8%
(Poland)	Rzeszów	185106	173897	93.9%	963	0.5%	164050	88.6%	3277	1.8%
(Ukraine)	Sambir	133814	56818	42.5%	68222	51.0%	43583	32.6%	78527	58.7%
(Poland)	Sanok	114195	67955	59.5%	38192	33.4%	48968	42.9%	54882	48.1%
(Ukraine)	Sokal	109111	42851	39.3%	59984	55.0%	25425	23.3%	69963	64.1%
(Poland)	Tarnobrzeg	73297	67624	92.3%	93	0.1%	65891	89.9%	194	0.3%
(Ukraine)	Turka	114457	26083	22.8%	80483	70.3%	6301	5.5%	97339	85.0%
(Ukraine)	Zhovkva	95507	35816	37.5%	56060	58.7%	20279	21.2%	66823	70.0%
Total	Lwów Voivodeship	3127409	1805035	57.7%	1067110	34.1%	1448826	46.3%	1314366	42.0%

== Location and area ==
The Voivodeship's area was 28,402 square kilometres (10,966 sq mi). It was located in southern Poland, bordering Czechoslovakia to the south, Kraków Voivodeship to the west, Lublin Voivodeship to the north and Volhynian Voivodeship, Stanisławów Voivodeship and Tarnopol Voivodeship to the east. Landscape was hilly (in the north) and mountainous (in the south, along the Czechoslovak border, with numerous spas located there, such as Slawsko). Forest covered 23.3% of the Voivodeship area (January 1, 1937 statistics; with the national average of 22.2%).

== Cities and counties ==
Lwów, the voivodeship's capital, was by far its biggest city, with a population of 318,000 (as of 1939). It was also the biggest city in south-eastern Poland and the third biggest city in the country (after Warsaw and Łódź), before Kraków (259,000). Other important centers in the voivodeship were: Przemyśl (in 1931 pop. 51,000), Borysław (pop. 41,500), Drohobycz (pop. 32,300), Rzeszów (pop. 27,000), Jarosław (pop. 22,200), Sambor (pop. 22,000), Sanok (pop. 14,300) and Gródek Jagielloński (pop. 12,900).

=== Counties of the Lwów Voivodeship ===
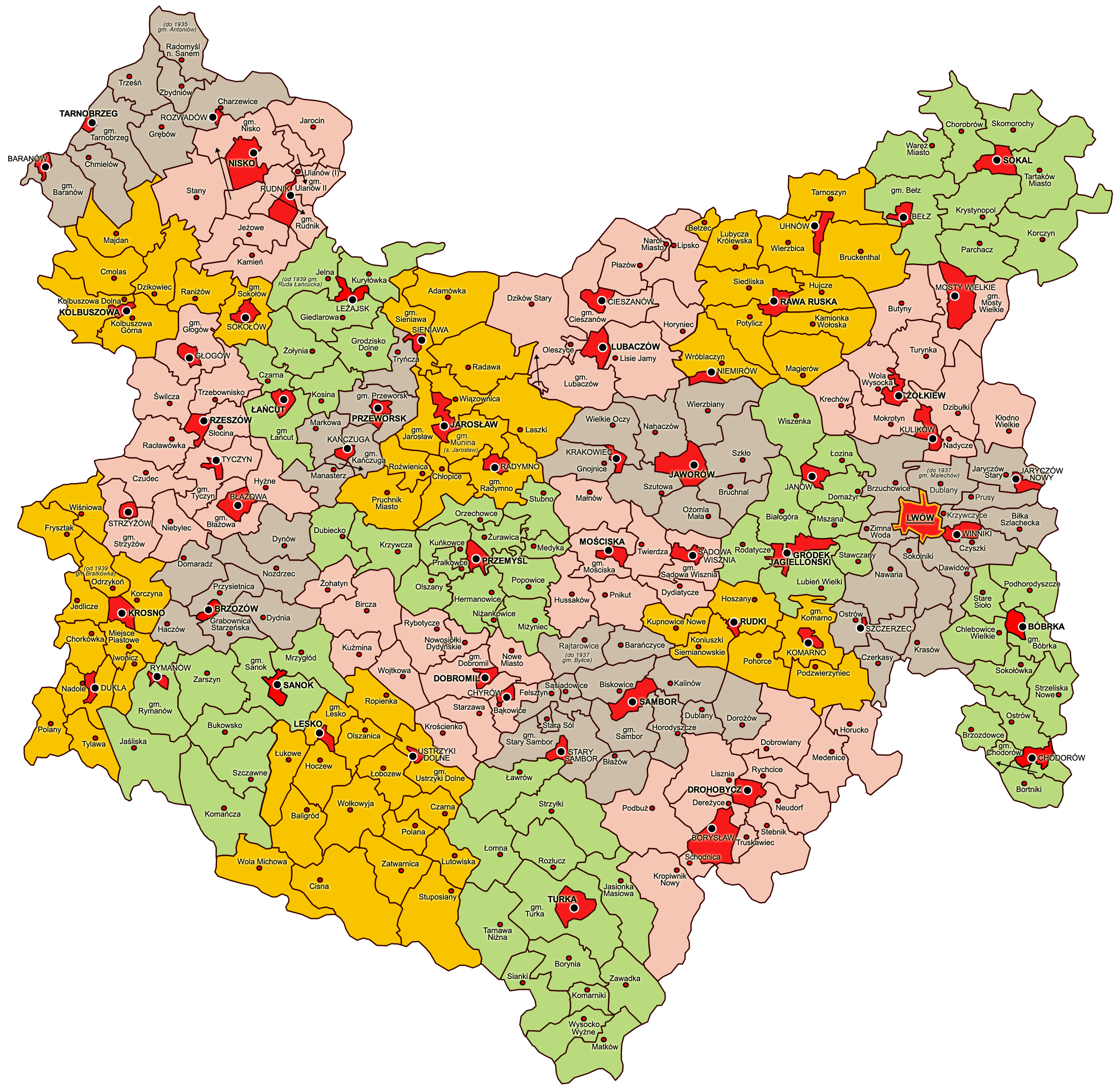
Administrative division of Lwów Voivodeship, 1938

- Bóbrka county (area 891 km^{2} pop. 97 100),
- Brzozów county (area 684 km^{2} pop. 83 200),
- Dobromil county (area 994 km^{2} pop. 94 000),
- Drohobycz county (area 1,499 km^{2} pop. 194 400),
- Gródek Jagielloński county (area 889 km^{2} pop. 85 000),
- Jarosław county (area 1,337 km^{2} pop. 148 000),
- Jaworów county (area 977 km^{2} pop. 86 800),
- Kolbuszowa county (area 873 km^{2} pop. 69 600),
- Krosno county (area 934 km^{2} pop. 113 400),
- Lesko county (area 1,832 km^{2} pop. 111 600),
- Lubaczów county (area 1,146 km^{2} 87 300),
- city of Lwów county (powiat lwowski grodzki - area 67 km^{2}, pop. 312 200),
- Lwów county (area 1,276 km^{2} pop. 142 800),
- Łańcut county (area 889 km^{2} pop. 97 700),
- Mościska county (area 755 km^{2} pop. 89 500),
- Nisko county (area 973 km^{2} pop. 64 200),
- Przemyśl county (area 1,002 km^{2} pop. 162 500),
- Przeworsk county (area 415 km^{2} pop. 61 400),
- Rawa Ruska county (area 1,401 km^{2} pop. 122 100),
- Rudki county (area 670 km^{2} pop. 79 200),
- Rzeszów county (area 1,270 km^{2} pop. 185 100),
- Sambor county (area 1,133 km^{2} pop. 133 800),
- Sanok county (area 1,282 km^{2} pop. 114 200),
- Sokal county (area 1,324 km^{2} pop. 109 100),
- Tarnobrzeg county (area 949 km^{2} pop. 72 200),
- Turka county (area 1,829 km^{2} pop. 114 400),
- Żółkiew county (area 1,111 km^{2} pop. 95 500).

== Railroads and industry ==
Interwar Poland was unofficially divided into two parts - Poland "A" (better developed) and Poland "B" (less developed). Lwów Voivodeship was located on the boundary line of these, with two main centres - the city of Lwów itself and the rich in oil southern region of Borysław and Drohobycz.

Starting in the mid-1930s, the Polish government decided to start a massive public works project, known as Centralny Okreg Przemyslowy (COP). The project covered western counties of the Voivodeship, where several factories were constructed (a steel mill in newly created city of Stalowa Wola, an aircraft engine and artillery factory in Rzeszów, as well as an armament factory in Sanok). This was a huge boost for overpopulated rural areas, where unemployment was high. The project was still incomplete at the beginning of the Second World War.

The railroad network was well-developed only in the area of Lwów, as the city itself was an important hub with as many as eight lines coming from it. Apart from this, some counties (like Kolbuszowa, Brzozów or Jaworów) lacked rail connections, while others (Lesko, Lubaczów, Rudki, Stary Sambor) were greatly underdeveloped. Other rail hubs were Rawa Ruska, Rzeszów, Rozwadów, Sambor, Drohobycz, Przeworsk, Chodorów, and Przemyśl.

As for January 1, 1938, total length of railroads within Voivodeship's boundaries was 1,534 kilometers, which was 5.4 km. per 100 km^{2}.

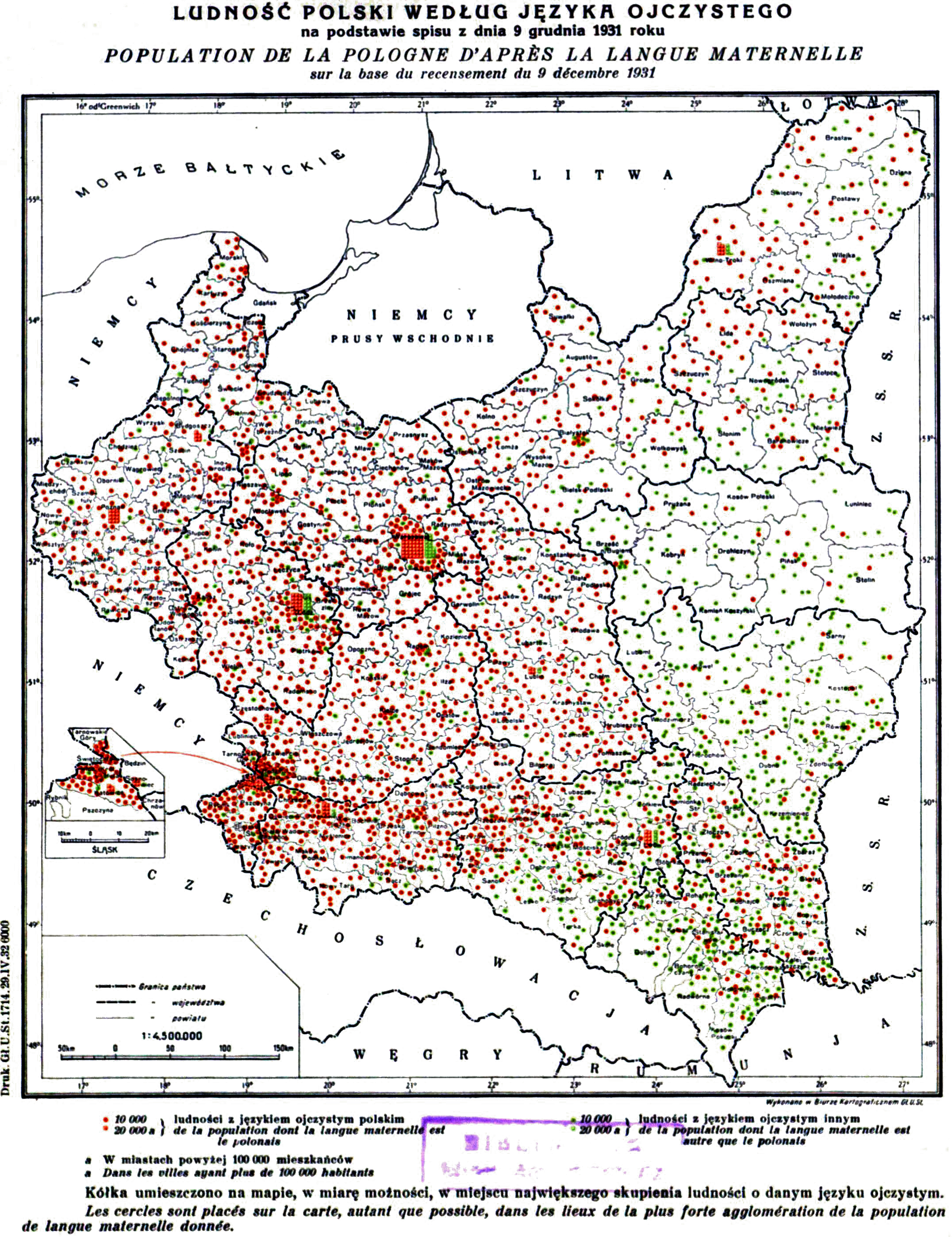
Mother tongue in Poland, based on the 1931 Polish census (original)

== Voivodes ==
- Kazimierz Grabowski, 23 April 1921 – 30 June 1924
- Stanisław Zimny, 10 March 1924 – 4 December 1924
- Paweł Garapich, 30 December 1924 – 28 July 1927
- Piotr Dunin-Borkowski, 28 July 1927 – 30 April 1928
- Wojciech Agenor Gołuchowski, 9 July 1928 – 29 August 1930
- Bronisław Nakoniecznikoff-Klukowski, 29 August 1930 – 6 July 1931
- Józef Rożniecki, 22 July 1931 – 30 January 1933
- Władysław Belina-Prażmowski, 31 January 1933 – 14 April 1937
- Alfred Biłyk, 16 April 1937 – 17 September 1939

== September 1939 and its aftermath ==
Following the Molotov–Ribbentrop Pact and the subsequent Russo-German conquest of Poland, the voivodeship was divided by the victors in late September 1939. The western part of the voivodeship was annexed by Germany and added to the General Government, while the eastern part (including the city of Lwów) was incorporated into the Ukrainian Soviet Socialist Republic. After July 1941, Lwów and the eastern part were occupied by Germany and also added to the General Government; the Polish underground administration existed there until August 1944. In 1945, when Poland's current borders were established, the western part of former Lwów Voivodeship (to the San river) was organized into the newly created Rzeszów Voivodeship; this territory has been part of the Subcarpathian Voivodeship since 1999.

The remaining eastern part became part of Ukraine's Lviv Oblast.
