= Polish Maritime Foundation =

Polish-based NGO

The Polish Maritime Foundation ((pl.) Polska Fundacja Morska) is an independent, non-profit, non-governmental organisation located in Swinoujscie, Poland.

== Aims ==
The aim of the foundation is the popularization of historical and training values of sailing, its material and spiritual culture, expanding the historical knowledge of sailing in Poland, Europe and the rest of the world, and the dissemination of Polish sailing achievements.

== Range of activities ==
These activities include:

the protection and preservation of material cultural heritage, the build-up of national resources, the preservation of historic relics and archives against the effects of natural disasters and the battle against the theft and illegal export of artifacts from Poland.

the dissemination of Polish sailing achievements, the making of historic relics available to the public and the saving of resources of cultural heritage in digital form according to the history of sailing.

== Methods ==
The primary method of the foundation's work is the coordination of initiatives for the building of a sailing museum and digital maritime library in Poland and giving support for institutions and private citizens working on the preservation of Polish sailing history.

Other projects, in partnership with other institutions from Poland and abroad, include: public debates, the publication of books, research and social campaigns, the organisation of conferences, workshops and training.

== Authorities ==
=== Board of Supervisors ===
- President - Marek Posobkiewicz
- Member - Helena Porębska
- Member - Marek Tan

=== Advisory Council ===
Members: (in alphabetical order)

- Krzysztof Baranowski (pl.), Krzysztof Baranowski (eng.)
- Wojciech Jacobson (pl.)
- Jarosław Kaczorowski (pl.)
- Jerzy Knabe (pl.)
- Maciej Krzeptowski (pl.)
- Jerzy Porębski (pl.)
- Henryk Wolski (pl.)

=== Board ===
The foundation is represented by the board.

President of the board is Marek T. Słaby.

== Projects ==
=== Current undertakings ===
==== Sailing Museum ====
The project proposes building the sailing museum in Swinoujscie in Poland. The museum will centralise all historic Polish sailing relics. When it is finished it will be the first sailing museum in Poland.

- The architect started with concepts and projects in 2009.

==== Digital Maritime Library ====
The project at the digital maritime library showed the following were required:

- A Bibliography of Polish maritime literature - online.
- The digitization of the Polish maritime magazine "Morze" (The Sea) from 1924.

=== Completed Projects ===
==== My name is Ludomir ====
The foundation was funded by publishing a book about a famous Polish sailor, Ludomir Mączka, by Macieja Krzeptowskiego and Wojciecha Jacobsona. Authors, experienced sailors and travellers were shown photographs of his life, who in his long-distance sailing career circumnavigated the globe many times in his beloved yacht "Maria".

==== America, 400 years later ====
The foundation organised an expedition with the racing yacht Fazisi sailing from Świnoujścia to New York City and Jamestown in the United States, in co-operation with the Polish Yachting Association of North America on the occasion of the 400th anniversary of the first Polish colonist to arrive in North America.

The expedition was planned and financed by sailors from all over Poland. It started from Swinoujscie and went via IJmuiden in the Netherlands; Saint Malo, on the west coast of France; the Azores; Bermuda; finishing in New York and Jamestown. The voyage coincided with Hurricanes Gustav, Hanna and Ike.
