= Eugene Platon =

Russian boat builder

Eugene Platon

Eugene Platon (Russian: Евгений Платон) is an international yachtsman, participant of a number of world class sailing events, including the most prestigious Volvo Ocean Race (formerly the Whitbread Round the World Race).

In 1989–90, he was a key member (watch leader) of Fazisi, the only Soviet Union entry to the Whitbread Round the World Race. Later, Eugene Platon brought his sailing/navigation and management experience to the Ukrainian team that for the first time in history entered Whitbread Round the World Race on board Hetman Sahaidachny in 1993–94. Competing with the world's top sailors, Platon was successful in skippering and navigating the Ukrainian yacht into 7th place overall, despite the fact that other competitors had significantly larger budgets.

Eugene Platon (1959) is a native of Republic of Moldova, previously U.S.S.R. In 1982, he graduated from MIPT with a M.S. degree as a qualified Engineer in applied mathematics and control science. Early practical sailing and navigation experience made Eugene Platon one of the best yacht racing skippers on the Black Sea, and he got even more advanced with his sailing and navigation skills while having the experience of ocean yacht racing.

Having sailed the Volvo Ocean Race twice (1989–90 and 1993–94), Platon also combined his skipper and navigator knowledge with yacht’s design and construction. "Hetman Sahaidachny" was a new generation of ocean racing yachts, - the high tech Whitbread 60 design. Using a design from top naval architect Bruce Farr, "Hetman Sahaidachny" was built under the direct management of Eugene Platon with advanced aerospace technology. For "Fazisi", Platon was also instrumental in the construction of the vessel.

Eugene Platon was the leader of the Russian Project for the 2008-09 Volvo Ocean Race.

In 2009 Platon joined as technical expert the SpeedDream project - a quest to build the fastest monohull on the planet.

== Bibliography ==
Platon is also known as the author of three books about ocean yacht racing:

- "The Russians are coming" (in Russian, PDF format),
- “Formula 1 of the Oceans” (in Russian),
- “Skipper’s Notes” (in Russian, PDF format)

== Video ==
- "Hetman Sahaidachny" in the 1993-94 Whitbread Round The World Race (in Russian)
- "Hetman Sahaidachny" story 15 years after (in Ukrainian) on YouTube
- "Fazisi" in 1989-90 Whitbread Round the World Race clip on YouTube
- "Fazisi" in 1989-90 Whitbread Round the World Race documentary on YouTube
