= Fazisi =

Racing yacht

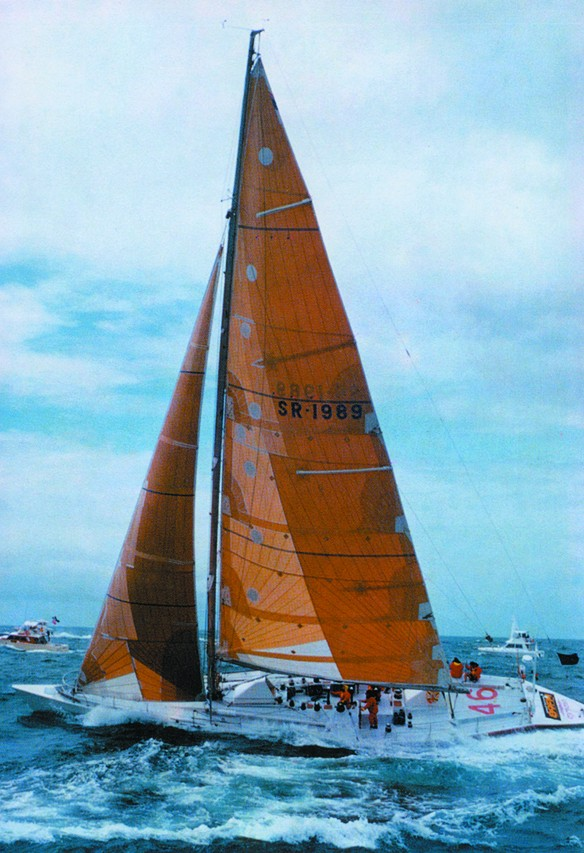
- Nation: United States
- Class: racing maxi
- Sail no: SR 1989
- Designer(s): Vladislav Murnikov
- Builder: Poti Shipbuilding, Georgia
- Launched: 1989
- Owner(s): K Mickler, Key West, Florida

Racing career
- Skippers: Skip Novak, Alexei Grischenko

Specifications
- Type: Single-hull (aluminium)
- Displacement: weight: 36 tonnes
- Length: 25 metres (82 ft)
- Beam: 6.5 metres (21 ft)
- Draft: 3.65 metres (12.0 ft)
- Mast height: 34 metres (112 ft)
- Sail area: 2 or 3 sloop; max. area 1200 m²
- Crew: 24

Notes
- Official website

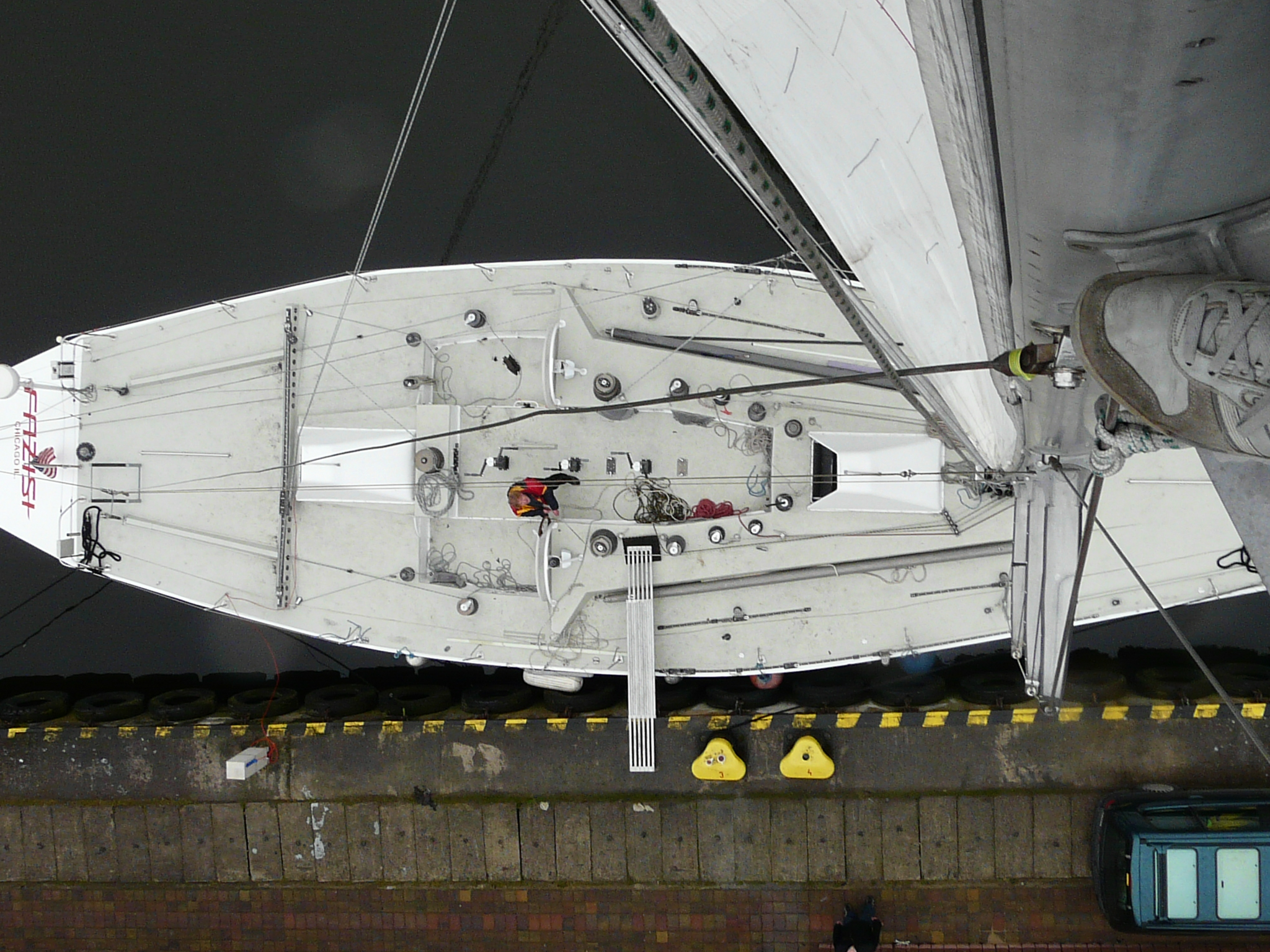
2008 deck layout of Fazisi

Fazisi is an 82-foot (25-metre) aluminium-hulled racing sloop, launched in 1989. She was built in Poti, Georgia, then part of the Soviet Union, for the specific purpose of entering the 1989–1990 Whitbread Round the World Race with an all-Soviet crew; she came eleventh out of 23 entrants, despite expectations that she would not be ready to take part. She was the first and last global racing yacht to represent the USSR.

After the race she took part in some international events, broke a speed record, and was used as a charter vessel. She was for some years owned by the Polish Yachting Association of North America. She was almost destroyed in a hurricane in 2017, but was recovered, bought by a private owner, and in 2025 was being prepared for restoration in Florida. A film about the yacht was released in 2026.

== Name ==
Fazisi was built in the region of Phasis, where Jason and the Argonauts travelled to take back the Golden Fleece.

== Construction ==
Fazisi was the first (and last) yacht to represent the Soviet Union.

She was built in 1989 to the design of Vladislav Murnikov in the Soviet Union specifically for the 1989–1990 Whitbread Round the World Race (now the Volvo Ocean Race). She was considered underfunded and poorly engineered; when she was measured she was deemed unstable, and parts had to be altered. Two days before the race was to begin, a new keel that had previously been on the yacht Rothman was attached. Her hull was constructed from an alloy, AMg-5061. She was classed as Murnikov-Design Group VTK 82 Sloop Maxi, and was the first-ever entry from the USSR. Inboard power was provided by a Yanmar 120hp engine, which would propel the boat at 9 knots. Under sail she would be capable of 25 knots. She was constructed by a team of enthusiasts under the watchful eye of security guards in Poti Shipyard, Georgia, was fitted out at Hamble, Hampshire, England, and her maiden voyage took place in The Solent.

== 1989–1990 Whitbread Round the World Race ==
London bookmakers were reputed to be giving odds of 100–1 that the Soviet vessel would not even make it to the starting line of the race.

With sail number SR 1989, Fazisi was intended to have an all-Soviet crew. Pre-and post-launch skipper was Ukrainian Alexei Grischenko, and co-skipper was American Skip Novak; Novak had participated in three Whitbread races previously. The yacht was transported to the UK in an Antonov 124, then the world's largest transport aircraft. This was just the hull, without mast, rigging, winches or keel; it arrived in London in July, with the race due to start in September.

Some 30 crew members took part, (Note: CREW: Serguei Akatyev; Valeri Alexeev; Sergei Borodinov; Juri Doroshenko; Alexei Drosdovsky; Alexei Grischenko (skipper); Brian Hancock; Mark Hauser; Roland Jourdain; Viktor KamKin; Guenadi Korolkov; Vladimir Kulininchenko; Abram Leibovich; David Matthews; Igor Mironenko; Vladislav Murnikov (designer); Skip Novak (co-skipper); Eugene Platon (watch leader); Viktor Pogrebnov; Thierry Rannou; Valeri Safioullin; James Saunders; Serguei Stanetsky; Nodari Teneishvili; Edgar Terechin; Dale Tremain; Jumberi Tsomaya; Roger Vaughn; Anatoli Verba; Victor Yasykov) and while most were Soviet citizens, eleven were Ukrainians, three were Americans, two were Georgians, Latvians, French and New Zealanders, one Kazakh, one British and five Russian. Among them was Eugene Platon, who had also been involved in the construction of the boat.

There were sailing disagreements within the crew, a serious lack of funding, and of support from the USSR, which itself was collapsing. At one point on the first leg, though, they were in the lead. They finished the first leg to Uruguay in sixth place, but tragedy occurred when Alexei Grischenko, who had been involved in the project from the start, and shouldered much of the responsibility for the problems, quit after the first leg and committed suicide (away from the boat) during the stopover in Uruguay. There were humorous incidents, though, reminiscent of Cold War bureaucracy, such as at Fort Lauderdale, where the Coast Guard categorized Fazisi as military in the absence of a classification for "non-combatant Soviet vessels in American waters".

Crew member Brian Hancock recalled:

Fazisi quickly coined its nickname of "The Russian Submarine" as the low freeboard made for a wet and wild ride. I remember one night running hard downwind off the coast of Brazil, kite up, bow down, and the boat fully submerged after each 30+ knot surf.

The whole race lasted some nine months, and Fazisi came eleventh in her class, and eleventh overall in a field of 23 boats, in 139 days, just ten days behind the winners. Skip Novak, in his 1990 book about the voyage, describes how the boat was nearly lost in the Southern Ocean during a storm. He also tells how on arrival in Australia, they find that the boat's sponsorship by Pepsi had been withdrawn during the race because of bad press in the United States. Even at the closing stages, key crew members were being excluded over organisational intrigue. But Novak describes the adventure as a shining illustration of Glasnost, which was a feature of the fundamental changes occurring in the Soviet Union at the time. When the sponsor withdrew and the yacht arrived in Australia, local fundraising secured food for the crew.

In the same race was Maiden, equally unique that year in being the first global race entrant with an entirely female crew.

== After Whitbread ==
After the race, Fazisi changed ownership a few times. She sailed in regattas and took people on voyages throughout the Caribbean, Bermuda, the Baltic Sea and back to the USA on several occasions. She had a 24-strong crew, and four permanent professional crew. She could remain unsupported at sea for up to 100 days.

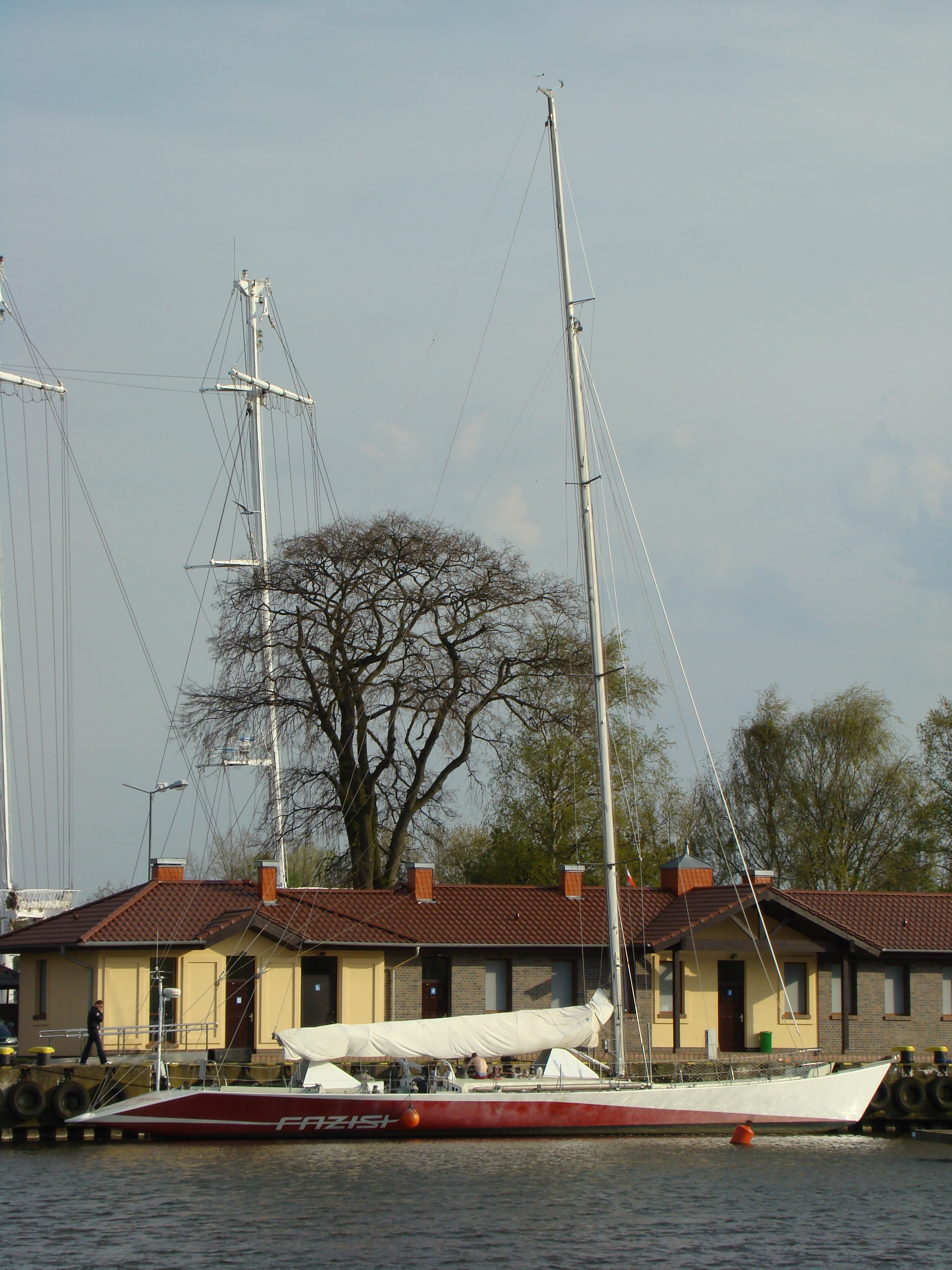
Fazisi in Swinoujscie, Poland, 2008

In 1999, she was owned by the Polish Yachting Association of North America (PYANA) with a registered home port of Chicago; in 2007, she took part in the Baltic Tall Ships Race, finishing in Szczecin, Poland; she also docked at the ports of Trzebież and Świnoujście. In 2008, for the 400th anniversary of the first Polish colonist to arrive in North America, the Polish Maritime Foundation organised an expedition by Fazisi, planned and financed by sailors from all over Poland. It started from Swinoujscie and went via IJmuiden in the Netherlands; Saint Malo, on the west coast of France; the Azores; Bermuda; finishing in New York and Jamestown. The voyage coincided with three hurricanes: Gustav, Hanna and Ike.

Fazisi was re-fitted in 2014. In 2015, she took part in the 39th Annual Long Island Regatta. In 2017, after several voyages between Key West, Florida, USA and Cuba, Fazisi was left at anchor during the Atlantic hurricane season.

In September 2017, Hurricane Irma struck the east coast of America. Millions of people were evacuated, and the hurricane caused catastrophic damage. Many boats were driven ashore, Fazisi among them. She was subsequently comprehensively looted. The PYANA could not afford to rescue her, but she was bought by Yuriy Ravlushko, who had worked on her 2014 refit. He carried out some in situ repairs while he tried to seek funding (aware that full restoration to racing standard might cost $800,000). Sadly, Fazisi was wrecked again, but she was ultimately bought by Kenneth Mickler (Note: Certificate of Title no. 155018890 issued by State of Florida, 30 May 2024) who found her a permanent home in Florida in 2025, where a full restoration could be undertaken. (Note: In September 2017, Hurricane Irma destroyed or damaged some 2,500 vessels in Florida waters, including Fazisi, which had been left at anchor near Fleming Island. The storm deposited her on Wisteria Island with several other vessels. She was declared derelict by local law enforcement and was loaded onto a barge and transported to Marathon Key. There, she was left to be scrapped. After a few months of discussion between the owner and law enforcement, she was given a second chance, and placed back in the waters of Key West. Her engine, which was removed after the hurricane, was installed and used to maneuver her once more, in an attempt to demonstrate that Fazisi was not derelict. A new owner bought her from the Polish Yachting Association of North America and performed repairs to try to secure her future. In March 2024, Florida Wildlife Commission (FWC) declared the boat derelict when they found her grounded in Jack Channel, 2 miles away. FWC contacted Ken Mickler, who had helped the owner reinstall the engine. He reassured FWC that she was an important part of racing history and should not be destroyed. She was reprieved once again, and Mickler, who was retired, took over ownership with a view to her preservation.)

== Film ==
In 2026, a 92-minute film, Argonauts at the End of History, directed by Sierra Pettengill, was completed and the premiere booked for showing at the Camden International Film Festival in Camden, Maine. The film documents the building of the boat at the end of the Cold War and her taking part in the global race, with archival footage and the crew's own words.

== See also ==
- List of The Ocean Race sailors

== Video ==
- "Fazisi" in 1989-90 Whitbread Round the World Race clip on YouTube
- "Fazisi" in 1989-90 Whitbread Round the World Race documentary on YouTube
