= Hetman Sahaidachny =

- Nation: Ukraine
- Class: Volvo Ocean 60

Racing career
- Skippers: Eugene Platon

Hetman Sahaidachny (Ukrainian: Гетьман Сагайдачний) is a Volvo Ocean 60 yacht. Named after cossack leader Petro Sahaidachny. She finished seventh in the W60 class of the 1993–94 Whitbread Round the World Race skippered by Eugene Platon.
