= Alfred Biłyk =

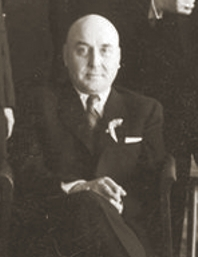
Alfred Biłyk

Alfred Biłyk (25 September 1889 in Lwów, Austria-Hungary – 19 September 1939 in Munkacs, Ukraine, then in Hungary) was a Polish lawyer, military officer, and politician, last Voivode of the Lwów Voivodeship. He committed suicide, when he realized that he would not be able to return to his hometown.

Bilyk was a graduate of a high school in Brzeżany, where he got to know another student of the school, Edward Rydz-Śmigły (both went to the same class and shared a bench). They became friends, joining together the Riflemen's Association and later, the Polish Legions. After World War I, Bilyk was nominated to the rank of major of the newly created Polish Army (on June 1, 1919) but following the Polish-Soviet War, he left the army and began studying law at the Jan Kazimierz University in Lwów. In 1923 or 1924, he opened a lawyer's office in Lwów.

A close associate of Rydz-Śmigły, Biłyk took advantage of the relationship, and was nominated to the post of Voivode of Tarnopol Voivodeship (15 July 1936). A year later, on 16 April 1937, he advanced even further, becoming the Voivode of Lwów Voivodeship.

On 12 September 1939, when first tanks of the Wehrmacht approached Lwów (see: Polish September Campaign, Battle of Lvov (1939)), Bilyk gave a famous speech, which was transmitted by the local radio station. He emphasized that Lwów, the city known as Semper Fidelis, would defend itself and that he himself would not abandon his post. However, three days later, the Prime Minister Felicjan Slawoj-Skladkowski ordered Bilyk to leave for Kuty, where the government of Poland was temporarily seated. From Kuty, Bilyk left Poland for Munkacs, which then belonged to Hungary.

On 17 September, following the Molotov–Ribbentrop Pact, units of the Red Army, allied with the Nazis, crossed eastern border of Poland. Facing little resistance, as bulk of the Polish Army was engaged in the West, the Soviets quickly moved westwards. Bilyk twice tried to return to his native city, but failed. Upon realizing that fate of Lwów had been settled, he committed suicide on 19 September 1939 in room number 5 of the Csillag Hotel. Before shooting himself, Bilyk wrote a farewell note, which is now kept in the Polish Institute and Sikorski Museum in London. This is what he wrote:

I could not fight in Lwów, as in compliance with directives of the Prime Minister, I left the city in circumstances which might have contradicted my previous words. My life seems to be of no value to Poland. I do not want to be interned till the end of the war. I want to save my honor. All my thoughts are now concentrated on Poland and on my dear family I am asking that these words were announced, so that my honor would remain untainted. Above all, I want Marshall Rydz-Smigly, General Sosnkowski and inhabitants of my city of Lwów to know about this letter

Signed
Alfred Bilyk, Voivode of Lwów,
Munkacs, 19 September 1939.
