= Tatranská Javorina =

- Municipality
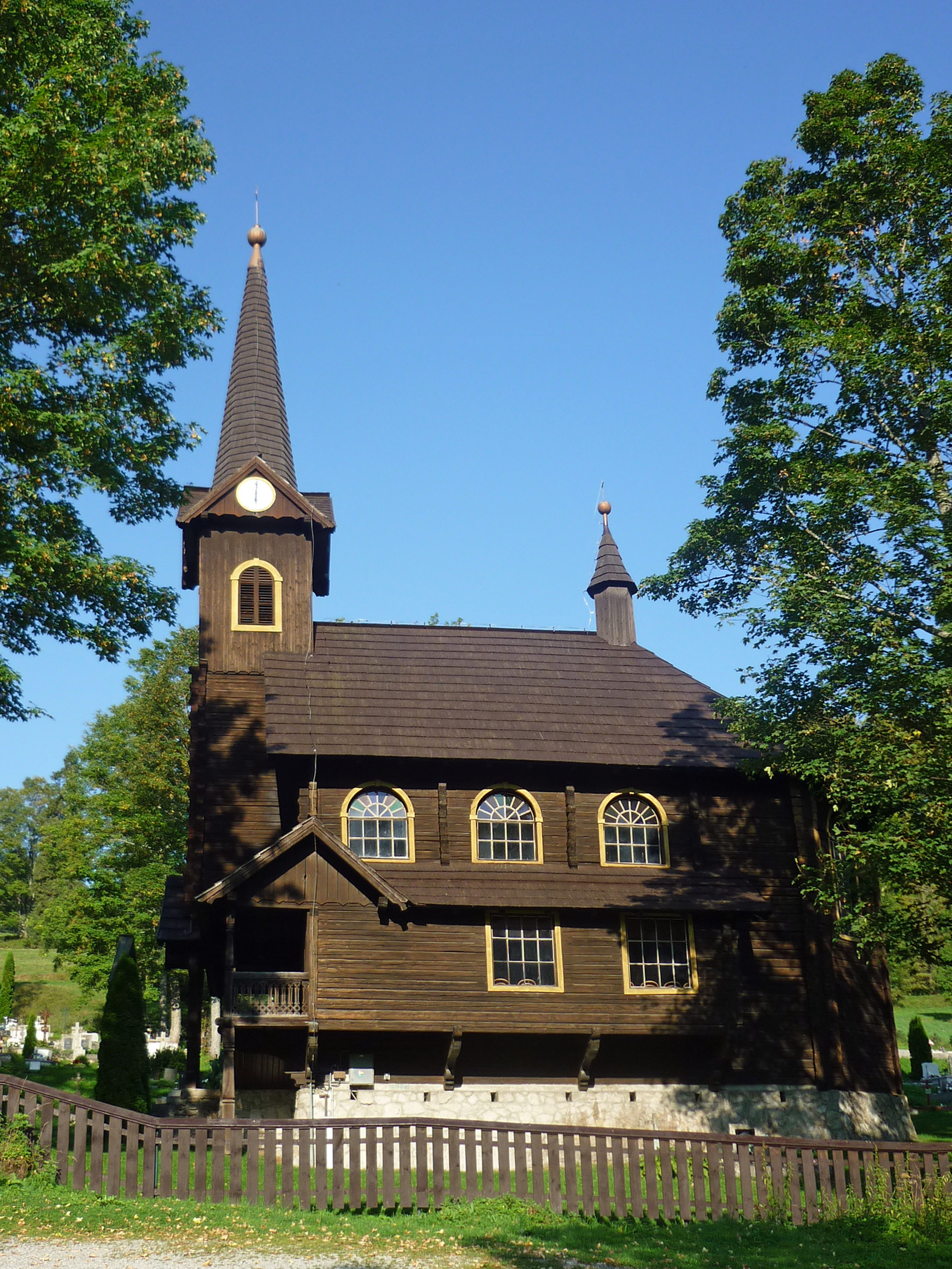

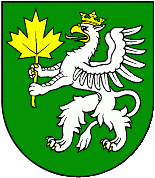
- Flag Coat of arms

- Location of Tatranská Javorina in the Prešov Region Location of Tatranská Javorina in Slovakia
- Coordinates: 49.27°N 20.13°E
- Country: Slovakia
- Region: Prešov Region
- District: Poprad District
- First mentioned: 1320

Area
  - Total: 94.06 km^{2} (36.32 sq mi)
- Elevation: 993 m (3,258 ft)

Population (2025)
  - Total: 166
- Time zone: UTC+1 (CET)
  - Summer (DST): UTC+2 (CEST)
- Postal code: 595 6
- Area code: +421 52
- Vehicle registration plate (until 2022): PP
- Website: tatranskajavorina.sk

Tatranská Javorina (Polish: Jaworzyna Tatrzańska, Hungarian: Tátrajavorina, German: Uhrgarten) is a village in Poprad District in the Prešov Region of northern Slovakia.

== Geography ==
The municipality lies at an altitude of 993 metres (3,258 ft) and covers an area of 94.06 km^{2} (36.32 sq mi) (2025). It is located in the Javorová Valley in the Tatra Mountains at the Polish-Slovak border.

== History ==
The municipality started in the 18th century. Between 1918 and 1921, the Polish government attempted several times to annex the village. On November 1, 1938, following the Munich Agreement, Poland took control over the village. During the Slovak invasion of Poland, Slovak troops occupied the town, but transferred it to German occupation on September 29, 1939. It was annexed into the General Government on October 12, 1939, but was officially transferred to Slovakia on November 24, 1939. During the Slovak National Uprising, the town was occupied by German troops, but on January 1, 1945, it was occupied by Soviet troops. After the war, the town became part of the Czechoslovak Socialist Republic, but due to the status of Czechoslovakia and Poland in the Warsaw Pact, the two countries only formally resolved disputes over the area on June 13, 1958, when an agreement was signed. Today, the town is part of independent Slovakia.

== Etymology ==
The name of the village likely originates from the Slovak word javor (maple), due to the local maple forests.

== Population ==
Population statistic (10 years)
Year	1995	2005	2015	2025
Count	212	230	216	166
Difference		+8.49%	−6.08%	−23.14%

Population statistic
Year	2024	2025
Count	169	166
Difference		−1.77%

It has a population of 166 people (31 December 2025).

=== Ethnicity ===
Census 2021 (1+ %)
Ethnicity	Number	Fraction
Slovak	170	96.04%
Not found out	6	3.38%
Polish	4	2.25%
Russian	2	1.12%
Total	177	

In year 2021 was 177 people by ethnicity 170 as Slovak, 6 as Not found out, 4 as Polish and 2 as Russian.

Note on population: The difference values of population numbers in the table "Population statistic" and in the sections "Ethnicity" & "Religion" is caused by the use of various statistical methods.

=== Religion ===
Census 2021 (1+ %)
Religion	Number	Fraction
Roman Catholic Church	137	77.4%
None	30	16.95%
Not found out	4	2.26%
Greek Catholic Church	3	1.69%
Evangelical Church	2	1.13%
Total	177	

In year 2021 was 177 people by religion 137 from Roman Catholic Church, 30 from None, 4 from Not found out, 3 from Greek Catholic Church, 2 from Evangelical Church and 1 from United Methodist Church.

== See also ==
- Polish-Czechoslovak border conflicts
