= Warning strike =

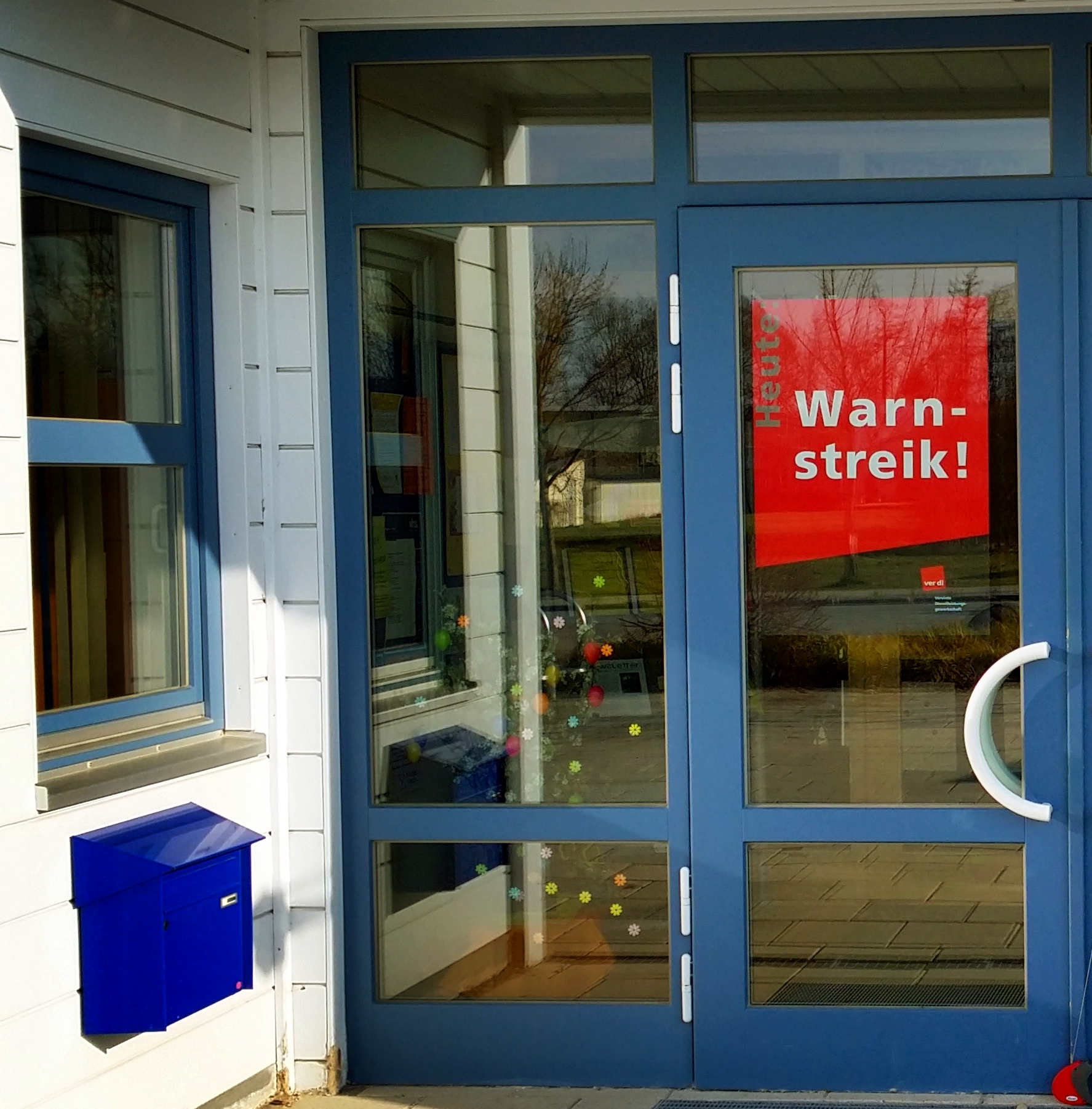
A sign announces a warning strike by the German trade union Ver.di at a kindergarten in Olching.

In the context of organized labor, a warning strike is a temporary, brief work stoppage in the course of the collective bargaining process.

Lasting a few hours or up to a day, it serves to signal the union's ability to mobilize through disruption of regular business, while stopping short of an indefinite strike. In some jurisdictions, a warning strike can be called by union leadership without a vote of the membership.

Warning strikes are most common in Germany, where they are known as Warnstreiks. They have been used frequently and to significant effect there. Since a 1976 ruling, the right to hold warning strikes outside the period of Friedenspflicht ("peace obligation") has been protected under the Basic Law.

They have also played an important role in Poland, where they are known as strajki ostrzegawcze. Notably, the four-hour 1981 warning strike was the largest strike in the nation's history, with as many as 14 million Poles participating, making up almost the entirety of the working population. Today, warning strikes are permitted under the 1991 Trade Union Act but are limited to 2 hours in length.

Occasional warning strikes have also occurred elsewhere, such as in South Africa, Nigeria, and Israel. In the United States, the National Labor Relations Act does not permit a series of short, interrelated strikes, but one short warning strike followed by an indefinite strike is allowed.

== See also ==
- Sitdown strike
- Wildcat strike
