= Krzysztof Baranowski =

Polish yachtsman

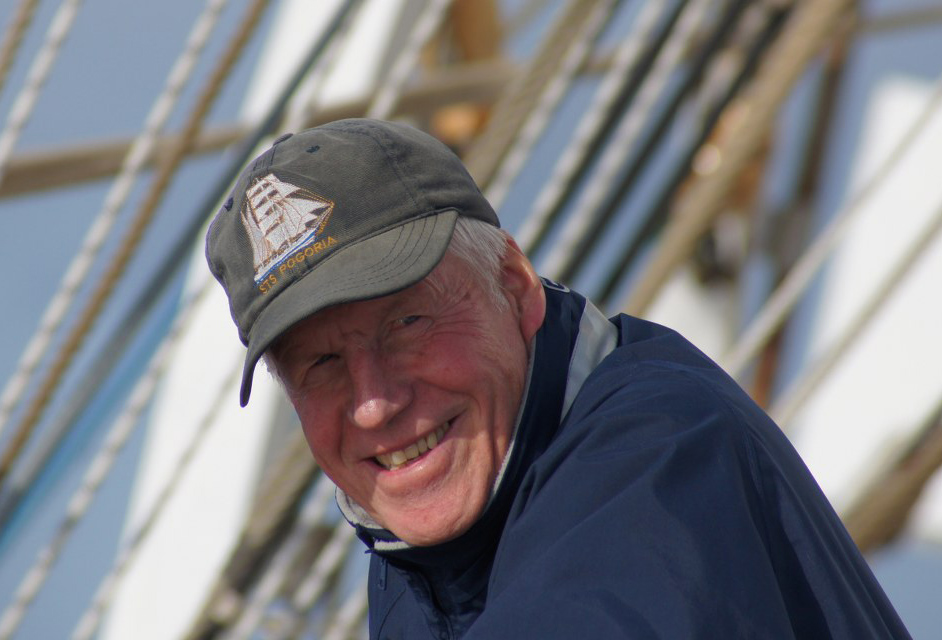
Krzysztof Baranowski

Krzysztof Baranowski (born 26 June 1938, in Lwów) – yachtsman, sailing captain, journalist, teacher, member of the Council Board of Polish Maritime Foundation. He is the first Pole to sail twice single-handed around the globe. He is a graduate of the Wroclaw University of Technology (engineer of electronics) and High School of the Journalists in Warsaw.

On 17 June 1972 in the transatlantic race of lonely yachtsmen from Plymouth, (Great Britain) to Newport, Rhode Island, United States) on the yacht "Polonez" took 12th place. He continued the way forward around the world (as the third Pole, after Władysław Wagner and Leonid Teliga). On the route from Plymouth he sailed 35,424 nautical miles (65,605 km) during 272 days from Newport – Cape Town – Hobart (Tasmania) – Stanley (the Falkland Islands) to Plymouth. He sailed around capes of Good Hope, Leeuwin and Horn among others. The voyage ended on 24 June 1973.

For the second time he set off on such a voyage in the period 2 October 1999 – 30 August 2000 on the SY yacht "Lady B". He began and he finished the voyage in the Portuguese Vilamoura port, sailed 24,000 nautical miles (44,000 km) with equatorial route, calling in at 20 ports. The course of the travel led among others through the Canary Islands, Caribbean, Panama Canal, Tahiti, Australia, Seychelles, Red Sea and the Mediterranean.

== Bibliography ==
- Krzysztof Baranowski - Polish Sailing Encyclopedia (pl.)
