= Polish Army manoeuvres in Volhynia =

In the interbellum Poland, headquarters of the Polish Army frequently organized huge military manoeuvres on the territory of the Volhynian Voivodeship. These war games would take place in early fall, right after harvest. Most probably, they were organized on the real estates, whose owners were mostly Polish members of upper classes (szlachta). Local Ukrainian peasants, who made a majority of inhabitants of Volhynia, frequently complained about these events.

The biggest of such manoeuvres took place between September 9 and 19, 1938 in the area between the cities of Lutsk, Rowne, Dubno and Horochow. These war games were also the biggest manoeuvres of the Polish Army before the outbreak of World War II. Polish historian Marek Piotr Deszczynski of the University of Warsaw presented a description of the war games.

The manoeuvres gathered the cream of the Polish Army, with Marshall Edward Smigly-Rydz, Minister of Military Affairs, General Tadeusz Kasprzycki, Army Inspector General Stanislaw Burhardt-Bukacki, Colonel Stanislaw Maczek, General Józef Kustroń, and other top officers. Altogether, around 50,000–60,000 soldiers participated in them, which was some 20% of the whole Army. Among units taking part, there were elite troops of the 21st Mountain Infantry Division from Bielsko-Biała, 10th Motorized Cavalry Brigade from Rzeszów, and 3rd Legions Infantry Division from Zamość. Additional forces were: 13th Infantry Division from Rowne, 27th Infantry Division from Kowel, and 30th Polesie Infantry Division from Kobryn. All units were divided into two groups - the Reds, and the Blues. The Reds were advancing from the east, and the Blues were supposed to halt their advance.

The manoeuvres were completed on September 19, 1938, when in Lutsk, local inhabitants presented to the Army military equipment, funded by the Volhynians. Next day, September 20 in Lutsk, a parade took place, witnessed by Edward Smigly-Rydz. On the same day, the 21st Mountain Infantry Division, and the 10th Motorized Cavalry Brigade were hastily transported to Upper Silesia, soon afterwards taking part in the annexation of Trans-Olza (see Independent Operational Group Silesia).

== Sources ==
- Marek Piotr Deszczynski, The Last Exam. Polish Army towards the Czechoslovakian Crisis of 1938-1939. Wydawnictwo NERITON, Warsaw 2003. ISBN 83-88973-61-4
